= One Hundred (Big City Greens) =

- Big City Greens episode
- Title card
- Episode no.: Season 4 Episode 20
- Directed by: Nick Sumida
- Written by: Shane Houghton; Gabi Rodea; Carl Edward Mongan; Raj Brueggemann; Sam Spina
- Production code: 420
- Original air date: May 3, 2025
- Running time: 25 minutes

Guest appearance
- Mark Hamill as Archemorus

Episode chronology
← Previous "Skipped Over"	Next → "Chip's Revenge"
- Big City Greens season 4

"One Hundred" (Note: Some sources incorrectly cite it as "On Hundred".) is the twentieth episode of the fourth season of the American animated television series Big City Greens, the 100th episode of the series overall, and a special episode that makes up the first part of a mid-season event. It originally aired on Disney Channel on May 3, 2025. This episode made Big City Greens the third Disney Television Animation series to reach 100 episodes, following Phineas and Ferb and Mickey Mouse Clubhouse. In this episode, the Greens, realizing they have reached their 100th adventure in Big City, are determined to make it their biggest one yet.

== Plot ==
Tilly looks back at all the memories she and her family made in her album and discovers that their next adventure will be their 100th. She alerts the family about the milestone and plan to split up to each make their 100th adventure their best.

Cricket and Remy decide to launch a chicken into space again, after their previous attempt was a failure. To help with their endeavor, the boys try to sneak inside Big Tech but a security robot stops and tries to kill them. However, Remy's tears malfunction and destroy the robot. Inside Big Tech, Cricket and Remy find a rocket but accidentally open a vault that Gwendolyn Zapp was in. Gwendolyn mistakes the two for her astronauts and plans to make them huge using her "Biggifer" but Cricket's chicken accidentally gets zapped instead. Cricket and Remy use Big Tech's giant mechs to defeat the monstrous chicken from destroying Big City. Despite it being too powerful, Cricket and Remy use the power of their friendship to drop-kick the chicken into space.

Tilly and Gramma Alice try to reconnect with the latter's deceased husband Ernest Green by holding a séance. They discover that it is possible to see Ernest again and question how. The two search for answers in the Fortune Teller's District of Big City and meet a physic named Archemorus who offers to help them communicate with Ernest. However, they must die in order to meet him in the afterlife. They drink a potion that ushers their consciousness into the afterlife for a short amount of time and are warned that they will be trapped in the afterlife forever if they don't return once called. Once there, Tilly and Alice search for Ernest but are called back once they finally find him. Because of this, Alice risks her life just to communicate with him.

Bill struggles to find an adventure until he is delivered a mysterious package with the wrong address. He decides to deliver the package to its rightful owner but accidentally trips while crossing the street during a countdown light. He initially plans to give up until he remembers the promise he made his family and vows not to let them down. He manages to cross the street before the countdown finishes and successfully delivers the package.

Back at home, Cricket, Tilly and Alice reveal that their adventures were made up the whole time and decide to celebrate their 100th adventure by being grateful for the adventures they already had. The Greens host a party to further celebrate and Bill tells more about the package delivery. It is revealed that the package was delivered to Babe, the girlfriend of Chip Whistler who plots his revenge on the Greens.

== Voice cast ==
- Chris Houghton as Cricket Green
- Marieve Herington as Tilly Green
- Bob Joles as Bill Green
- Artemis Pebdani as Alice Green
- Zeno Robinson as Remy Remington
- Billy West as Nick Mulligan
- Anna Akana as Gloria Sato
- Danny Trejo as Vasquez
- Cheri Oteri as Gwendolyn Zapp
- Mark Hamill as Archemorus
- Tim Blake Nelson as Ernest Green
- Paul Scheer as Chip Whistler
- June Diane Raphael as Babe
- Raj Brueggemann as Worm Guy
- Shane Houghton as Chicken
- Raven-Symoné as Maria Media
- Tim Robinson as Gregly

== Production ==
"One Hundred" was directed by Nick Sumida and written by Shane Houghton, Gabi Rodea, Carl Edward Mongan, Raj Brueggemann, Sam Spina. Mark Hamill guest stars in this episode, voicing Archemorus, a kooky mystic that Gramma and Tilly visit in their sub-plot.

== Release and reception ==
"One Hundred" was announced ahead of the season 4 premiere, then with no known release date. It was first teased in April 2025, where it was announced to premiere on May 3. The episode received 0.14 million viewers on the day of its premiere. John Schwarz of Bubbleblabber gave the episode a 7.5 out of 10, writing that the episode is "a fun, action-packed, and heartwarming way to celebrate this milestone, and it leaves you excited for the many more adventures the Green family will undoubtedly have."
