= List of Big City Greens characters =

Characters of Big City Greens

Big City Greens is an American animated television series created by the Houghton Brothers (Chris and Shane Houghton) that premiered on June 18, 2018, on Disney Channel, and later received a musical film. The following article includes an extensive list of characters within the Big City Greens universe.

== Overview ==
Character	Voice actor	Seasons					Movie
Character	Voice actor	1	2	3	4	5	Movie
Cricket Green	Chris Houghton	Main	Main	Main	Main	Main	Main
Tilly Green	Marieve Herington	Main	Main	Main	Main	Main	Main
Bill Green	Bob Joles	Main	Main	Main	Main	Main	Main
Alice Green	Artemis Pebdani	Main	Main	Main	Main	Main	Main
Remy Remington	Zeno Robinson	Recurring	Recurring	Main	Main	Main	Main
Nancy Green	Wendi McLendon-Covey	Recurring	Recurring	Main	Main	Main	Main
Gloria Sato	Anna Akana	Recurring	Recurring	Recurring	Main	Main	Main
Nick Mulligan	Billy West		Guest	Guest	Main		
Chip Whistler	Paul Scheer	Recurring	Recurring	Guest	Recurring		
Gwendolyn Zapp	Cheri Oteri	Recurring	Recurring	Recurring	Recurring		Main
Vasquez	Danny Trejo	Recurring	Recurring	Recurring	Recurring	Recurring	

== Main ==
=== Cricket Green ===
Cricket Green (voiced by Chris Houghton) is a rambunctious 10-year-old country boy. He is based on series co-creator Chris Houghton as a child.

He is an optimistic and mischievous boy driven by his curiosity and enthusiasm, which usually brings him on thrilling adventures. While often kooky, he can be mature when he needs to and can take responsibility sometimes. He is usually the troublemaker of the Green family, prone to causing chaos or destruction. His catchphrase is "Bingo! Bango!"

=== Tilly Green ===
Tilly Green
- Big City Greens character
- First appearance: "Space Chicken"; June 18, 2018
- Created by: The Houghton brothers
- Designed by: The Houghton brothers
- Voiced by: Marieve Herington

In-universe information
- Family: Bill and Nancy Green (parents); Cricket Green (little brother)
- Relatives: Alice and Ernest Green (paternal grandparents); Nick Mulligan (matermal grandfather)
- Nationality: American

Tilly Green (voiced by Marieve Herington) is Cricket's older sister who is well-behaved and more restrained than most of the family. She is an amalgamation of various girls that the Houghton brothers knew.

Tilly is wise and often imaginative. She is selfless and cares for Cricket more than anything, and they even have a "sibling code" which is to be invoked in the most dire of situations. She is also a huge animal lover, though she isn't so fond of horses, as revealed in "Horse Girl". She sometimes tends to overthink things and is often indecisive. She can get lost in characters but never forgets who she is.

Tilly owns a sack doll companion named Saxon (voiced by Dan Stevens in "Saxon Saxability").

=== Bill Green ===
Bill Green
- Big City Greens character
- First appearance: "Space Chicken"; June 18, 2018
- Created by: The Houghton brothers
- Designed by: The Houghton brothers
- Voiced by: Bob Joles

In-universe information
- Full name: Billiam Robert Green
- Family: Alice and Ernest Green (parents)
- Spouse: Nancy Green (ex-wife)
- Children: Cricket and Tilly Green
- Relatives: Nick Mulligan (ex-father-in-law)
- Nationality: American

Billiam Robert "Bill" Green (voiced by Bob Joles as an adult, Andre Robinson as a child) is the father of Cricket and Tilly and son of Alice and Ernest. He is based on a few farmers, and the Houghton brothers' father-in-law, who is also named Bill.

Bill is a farmer who is hard-working, kind and patient, though can often get overwhelmed pretty easily. He can also get pretty angry at times, especially when his orders are disobeyed. Despite being overweight, he possesses immense strength and agility.

He lost part of one of his fingers in an incident with a hay baler. Ever since he was a child, he dreamed of owning his own farm one day, and was always open to helping Alice on her farm back then, as revealed in "Greens' Acres". Eventually, Bill came to own a farm in Smalton. However, the farm over time stopped doing well and he was forced to sell it and had to move him and his family to live with Alice in Big City, as revealed in "Dirt Jar".

=== Alice Green ===
Alice Green
- Big City Greens character
- First appearance: "Space Chicken"; June 18, 2018
- Created by: The Houghton brothers
- Designed by: The Houghton brothers
- Voiced by: Artemis Pebdani

In-universe information
- Full name: Alice Delores Green
- Spouses: Ernest Green (husband; deceased)
- Children: Bill Green
- Relatives: Cricket and Tilly Green (grandchildren); Nancy Green (ex-daughter-in-law)
- Nationality: American

"Gramma" Alice Delores Green (voiced by Artemis Pebdani) is Bill's mother and the paternal grandmother of Cricket and Tilly. She is based on the Houghton brothers' grandmother, who is also named Alice.

Alice has a cantankerous personality and is strict, but also caring. She owns a sword that she uses in combat. She can bake cookies known as "Feel Better Butter Biscuits", a treat that helps injured people feel better and is so delectable she keeps the recipe behind an elaborate security mechanism in her room to prevent copies from being made.

=== Remy Remington ===
Remy Remington
- Big City Greens character
- First appearance: "Space Chicken"; June 18, 2018
- Created by: The Houghton brothers
- Designed by: The Houghton brothers
- Voiced by: Zeno Robinson

In-universe information
- Full name: Reminald R. Remington
- Family: Rashida and Russell Remington (parents)
- Nationality: American

Reminald R. "Remy" Remington (voiced by Zeno Robinson) is Cricket's best friend who he met shortly after the former moved to Big City in "Space Chicken".

Remy is a joyous kid who hails from a wealthy family. He has wanted to impress his father Russell for a long time. He is a violinist and an expert at video games. He has once said he likes to go crazy online. He is often shown to be sensitive at times.

=== Nancy Green ===
Nancy Green
- Big City Greens character
- First appearance: "Phoenix Rises"; August 8, 2018
- Created by: The Houghton brothers Katie Aldworth; Rebecca Schauer
- Designed by: The Houghton brothers
- Voiced by: Wendi McLendon-Covey

In-universe information
- Family: Nick Mulligan (father)
- Spouse: Bill Green (ex-husband)
- Children: Cricket and Tilly Green
- Relatives: Alice Green (ex-mother-in-law)
- Nationality: American

Nancy Green (née Mulligan; voiced by Wendi McLendon-Covey, Candace Kozak as a child) is the mother of Cricket and Tilly and Bill's ex-wife who debuted in "Phoenix Rises".

Nancy is spunky and rebellious and has no care for authority or responsibilities. Though, during her time in Smalton, she has developed more responsibility. Nancy was in jail prior to her debut. In "Trailer Trouble", it is revealed that she used to be a part of a biker gang called The Stingers, which she left to take care of Cricket and Tilly.

=== Gloria Sato ===
Gloria Sato
- Big City Greens character
- First appearance: "Space Chicken"; June 18, 2018
- Created by: The Houghton brothers
- Designed by: The Houghton brothers
- Voiced by: Anna Akana

In-universe information
- Family: Mr. and Mrs. Sato (parents)
- Nationality: American

Gloria Sato (voiced by Anna Akana) is a friend of the Green family. She has dreams of one day going to Paris. Upon first meet, Gloria was not fond of the Greens, especially Cricket. Though, as time went on, she slowly warmed up to and later befriended the Greens. She began living with them following "Chipocalypse Now", and opened her own restaurant called Gloria + Green Café, with the help of Alice.

=== Nick Mulligan ===
Nick Mulligan
- First appearance: "Greens' Acres"; August 8, 2020
- Created by: Amy Hudkins; Jonathan Wallach; Kenny Byerly
- Designed by: The Houghton brothers
- Voiced by: Billy West

In-universe information
- Children: Nancy Green (daughter)
- Relatives: Cricket and Tilly Green (grandchildren); Bill Green (ex-son-in-law)
- Nationality: American

Nick Mulligan (voiced by Billy West) is the father of Nancy Green and the maternal grandfather of Cricket and Tilly. He first appeared in "Greens' Acres" within a flashback and later made an official debut in "Green Trial", becoming a major character throughout the fourth season. Nick is a conman to which Nancy views as a bad influence.

== Recurring ==
=== Animals ===
- Phoenix (vocal effects provided by Dee Bradley Baker, voiced by Jameela Jamil in episodes focused on the animals) is the Green family's pet dog.
- Dirtbag (voiced by Carl Tart in "Animal Farm") is the Green family's pet cat.
- Cogburn (voiced by Alfred Molina) is a mean rooster owned by the Green family.
- Melissa (vocal effects provided by Dee Bradley Baker, voiced by Marieve Herington in episodes focused on the animals) is the Green family's goat.
- Miss Brenda (voiced by Artemis Pebdani) is the Green family's cow.
- Admiral Mustard (voiced by Marieve Herington) is Gloria Sato's parrot.

=== Other children ===
- Benny (voiced by Luke Lowe) is a toddler notable for his cuteness.
- Kiki Kitashima (voiced by Monica Ray from S1E3a—S3E3a, Stephanie Sheh from S3E17a and onward)
- Weezie Eastman (voiced by Lamar Woods) is a blue skinned kid who is well known for his laid-back attitude and speaking in short phrases.
- Gregly (voiced by Tim Robinson) is a kid with a negative and cantankerous attitude towards almost everything. It is evident that he is rather lonely, as he has no real friends. Therefore, in "Guiding Gregly", he tries to be agreeable (with the help of Cricket and Remy) with the other kids, only to explode in rage after seeing a trailer for a Croblins movie, a film franchise he absolutely despises. He later befriends some old people, as they understand his mindset.

=== Neighbors ===
- Brett Eze (voiced by Colton Dunn) is a neighbor of the Greens who lives in the apartment next to their home. He is laidback and seems not to mind the usual antics of the Greens.
- Mr. Alucard Grigorian (voiced by Maurice LaMarche) is a neighbor of the Greens who lives in the apartment next to their home. He has had a long-term rivalry with Alice since his move, which has since turned friendly following "Truce Bomb". He likes to sing and owns a pet cat named Anoush.
- Doug Perkins (voiced by Tom Gammill) is Bill's friend who he meets in "DependaBill". He tends to joke around when asks if he likes something that he does, Doug says, "No, I don't, I LOVE IT!"

=== Chip Whistler ===
Chip Whistler (voiced by Paul Scheer) is the former CEO of Wholesome Foods who is prone to chipping or breaking his teeth throughout the series. He was originally the manager of Wholesome Foods until his father Mr. Whistler gave him the position.

He originally had no problem of the Greens, but has since turned against them ever since the Greens inadvertently chipped his tooth in "Supermarket Scandal" by trying to eat their fake produce. In "Chipocalypse Now", he attempted to destroy the Greens' home to build a parking lot for Wholesome Foods. Afterwards, he was banned from Big City, and was presumed dead due to his helicopter crash. However, in "Chipped Off", it was revealed that he survived and afterwards created a fake identity, going by the name of Norm Alguy. Later, in "Evil Family", he builds an "evil family", which consisted of his girlfriend Babe and later the Order of the Fang. As of "Chip's Revenge", he is serving three life sentences in prison.

=== Gwendolyn Zapp ===
Gwendolyn Zapp (voiced by Cheri Oteri) is the CEO of BigTech who likes to create bizarre or unnecessary products. She served as the antagonist of Big City Greens the Movie: Spacecation in which she sent the Green family into space despite knowing the dangers.

=== Vasquez ===
Vasquez (voiced by Danny Trejo), formerly Tiger Fang, is the bodyguard and best friend of Remy Remington, and a former member of the Order of the Fang. He is deeply connected to Remy, and tries to do anything in his power to keep him safe.

After meeting Remy as a baby, he had a sudden change of heart which led to his departure from the Order of the Fang to become Remy's bodyguard, abandoning his former alias.

=== Andromeda ===
Andromeda (voiced by Nicole Byer) is a conspiracy theorist who becomes Tilly's best friend. She is wary of everything and is always on the lookout for extraterrestrial life.

=== Officer Keys ===
Officer Keys (voiced by Andy Daly as an adult, Jason Maybaum as a child in "Greens' Acres") is the friendly neighborhood police officer in Big City.

=== Maria Media ===
Maria Media (voiced by Raven-Symoné) is the local news reporter in Big City.

=== Gabriella Espinosa ===
Gabriella Carlita Espinosa (voiced by Jenna Ortega from S1E25a—S3E15b, Nikki Castillo from S3E20 and onward) is Cricket's ex-girlfriend who he used to pull pranks with and on as a way of affection. In "Split Decision", it is revealed she has taken interest in goths and has reinvented herself accordingly. Prior to her transformation in said episode, she was much like Cricket; a kid who loved to cause trouble.

=== Rashida and Russell Remington ===
Rashida (voiced by Lorraine Toussaint) and Russell Remington (voiced by Colton Dunn as an adult, Andre Robinson as a child in "Greens' Acres") are the wealthy parents of Remy. Russell is a professional football player with his own video game series.

=== Community Sue ===
"Community" Sue Lanemoto (voiced by Betsy Sodaro) is the director of the Big City Community Center.

== Minor ==
- Ernest "Grampa" Green (voiced by Tim Blake Nelson) is the deceased father of Bill, husband of Alice, and paternal grandfather of Cricket and Tilly. He appears in "Garage Tales" within a flashback and "One Hundred" within a fantasy.
- Alexander (voiced by John Early) and Terry are two recurring background characters in a romantic relationship. Alexander is a loud-mouth and Terry doesn't speak.
- Juan Pablo (voiced by Vladimir Caamaño) is a gym instructor at the Big City Community Center. He first appears in "Backflip Bill".
- Itchaboi (voiced by Caldwell Tanner) is a popular internet influencer that Remy had become obsessed with. He first appears in "Bad Influencer".
- Don (voiced by Shane Houghton) and Dawn (voiced by Marieve Herington) are a famous realtor couple in Big City.
- Bash (voiced by Thomas Middleditch) and Bella (voiced by Lauren Lapkus) are a couple of criminals in Big City. They first appear in "Gramma Driver".
- Good Ol' Joe (voiced by Darin De Paul) is Bill's good friend from Smalton who lost touch with him after they moved to Big City.
- The Order of the Fang is a group of mercenaries.
  - Viper Fang (voiced by Joe Manganiello)
  - Wolf Fang (voiced by Jeffrey Dean Morgan)
  - Spider Fang (voiced by Paget Brewster)
- Mayor Hansock (voiced by Andy Richter) is the mayor of Big City.
- Patti (voiced by Brooke Dillman) is the owner of her eponymous diner Patti's Diner in Smalton. She makes Tilly's favorite blueberry pie.
- Dwayne "Wayne" (voiced by Tony Cavalero) is an employee at Patti's Diner in Smalton.
- Jade (voiced by Liza Koshy) is the hard-working shift manager at Gloria + Green Café. She was hired by Gloria in "Coffee Mates" to make her life easier.
- Mr. and Mrs. Sato (voiced by Keone Young and Amy Hill respectively) are the parents of Gloria Sato who always expect the best out of her and often compare her to her cousin Emily.
- Mr. Whistler (voiced by Ed Begley Jr.) is the father of Chip and former CEO of Wholesome Foods before he resigned and gave the position to his son.
- Ms. Miriam Cho (voiced by Anna Akana) was the owner of Big Coffee prior to its demolition.
- Babe (voiced by June Diane Raphael) is Chip Whistler's fiancé.
- "Wholesome" Greg (voiced by Shane Houghton) is Chip's assistant.
- Hector (voiced by Harvey Guillén) is Cricket's old friend from Smalton. He only appears in "Junk Mountain" and "Bunny Farm".
- Lupita (voiced by Rylee Alazraqui) is Hector's younger sister.

== Notable guest stars ==
- Vasquez Sr. (voiced by Keith Ferguson) is the father of Vasquez. He only appears in "Remy Rescue".
- Jyle Donelan (voiced by Wallace Shawn) is the CEO of Beef Up Corporation. He only appears in "Night Bill".
- Donny Tinselton (voiced by Thomas Middleditch) is a film director. He only appears in "Cricket's Kapowie".
- Confident Stylist (voiced by Jonathan Van Ness) is a hair stylist. He only appears in "Cricket's Kapowie".
- Kara Karaoke (voiced by Macy Gray) is the owner of Okay Karaoke in Big City. She only appears in "Okay Karaoke".
- Mr. Extras (voiced by Alfonso Ribeiro) is a feature in the virtual reality game Outpost Infinity that tries to sell players addons. He only appears in "Virtually Christmas".
- Bonnie Sparks (voiced by Amy Sedaris) is an agent at Big Jingle. She only appears in "Jingled".
- Rick Razzle (voiced by Michael Bolton) is a former commercial jingle writer at Big Jingle with a love for singing long notes. He only appears in "Jingled".
- Dr. Maya Bloom (voiced by Margo Martindale) is a mobile therapist. She only appears in "Unguarded".
- Archemorus (voiced by Mark Hamill) is a physic. He only appears in "One Hundred".
- Colleen Voyd (voiced by Renée Elise Goldsberry) was the commander of S.S. Gwendolyn. She only appears in Big City Greens the Movie: Spacecation.
- Lord Argyle (voiced by David Tennant) is the father of Saxon’s imaginary love interest in the episode "Saxon Saxability".
