= Space Chicken (Big City Greens) =

Series premiere of Big City Greens

- Big City Greens segment
- Title card
- Episode no.: Season 1 Episode 1a
- Directed by: The Houghton Brothers
- Written by: The Houghton Brothers
- Production code: 101a
- Original air date: June 18, 2018
- Running time: 11 minutes

Episode chronology
← Previous —	Next → "Steak Night"
- Big City Greens season 1

"Space Chicken" is the series premiere of the American animated television series Big City Greens. It originally aired on Disney Channel on June 18, 2018, though it was released on DisneyNow and YouTube ten days prior. It is chronologically the second episode, following "Welcome Home", and this is reflected on Disney+. In this episode, series protagonist Cricket Green, with the help of his sister Tilly and new friend Remy, attempts to launch a chicken into space to impress his neighbors.

== Plot ==
External videos
- Space Chicken / Steak Night 🐔 | S1 E1 | Full Episode | Big City Greens | Disney Channel — Official upload of the episode onto YouTube

Shortly after moving to their new home in Big City in "Welcome Home", Cricket and Tilly Green return from a frantic journey that they took on a lawnmower. Their father, Bill, is incredulous as to how they had reached that point: they had first mowed the front yard, then a golf course where they were punted with golf balls, and then the highway. Cricket does not know how he and Tilly — who had enjoyed "see[ing] danger" — returned. Bill tells the kids that the city is vastly different than the country, and that the Greens would all need to make a good first impression.

Cricket interprets making a good impression as wanting to impress his neighbors; he sets out to launch a chicken into space, but his initial attempt proves fruitless. He and Tilly, now joined by local boy Remy Remington, sneak into their Gramma Alice's room to search for her old pantyhose, but are caught and let off the hook by giving her a kiss.

One of Cricket's attempts ends up launching a chicken into the next door café, Big Coffee, infuriating its customers and the barista, Gloria Sato. She demands Bill to not allow his animals roam freely into the building next door, and Bill grounds Cricket to his room for the rest of the day. When Remy asks if he should go with Cricket, he is scared by Bill's disappointment and does so.

While Cricket is grounded, he and Remy discover a rocket that they can use to launch the chicken into space, and sneak out. However, it is a dud, and in a state of panic, he starts to launch all the other chickens into space using the pantyhose, which starts to cause chaos within the neighborhood.

Now out of chickens, Cricket decides to launch the first chicken into space. He whispers to the chicken that he believes in her, and the attempt succeeds. Bill is shocked by the chaos, but is soon impressed when Cricket's stunt manages to make a good first impression on the neighborhood.

== Voice cast ==
- Chris Houghton as Cricket Green
- Marieve Herington as Tilly Green, Little Girl, Sunglasses Woman, and Blue Girl
- Bob Joles as Bill Green
- Artemis Pebdani as Alice Green and Mrs. Lewis
- Zeno Robinson as Remy Remington, Undecided Customer and Police Officer
- Anna Akana as Gloria Sato
- Shane Houghton as Golfer, Chicken Salad Customer, and Unimpressed Cap Man
- Scott Menville as Driver and Magenta Boy

== Production ==
=== Background ===
Production of Big City Greens began as Country Club, which had been pitched to Disney in 2012. It was greenlit as a Disney XD series in 2016. The series is created by the brothers Chris and Shane Houghton, who originally worked on Nickelodeon's Harvey Beaks. Chris Houghton also worked as a storyboard artist on Gravity Falls with Rob Renzetti. The series was later renamed to Big City Greens on July 21, 2017.

=== Development ===
"Space Chicken" was directed by Chris and Shane Houghton, storyboarded by Chris Houghton and written by the Chris and Shane. The idea for this episode was conceived by Shane. Season 1 of Big City Greens is arranged on Disney+ to create a proper continuity. While "Space Chicken" was produced and aired as the first episode on Disney Channel, it is positioned as the second episode segment following "Welcome Home" on Disney+.

== Release and reception ==
"Space Chicken" originally aired on Disney Channel on June 18, 2018, but was released earlier to DisneyNow and YouTube on June 10.

"Space Chicken" was watched by 680 thousand viewers on the day of its premiere. Common Sense Media's Emily Ashby describes Cricket's attempt to launch a chicken into space in this episode as an example of the series' imaginative and ridiculous adventures.
