= Big City Greens season 1 =

Big City Greens
- Season 1
- Promotional poster
- Starring: Chris Houghton; Marieve Herington; Bob Joles; Artemis Pebdani
- No. of episodes: 30 (58 segments)

Release
- Original network: Disney Channel
- Original release: June 18, 2018 – March 9, 2019

Season chronology
- Next → Season 2

The first season of Big City Greens premiered on Disney Channel on June 18, 2018, and ended on March 9, 2019. The season follows the adventures of the Green family, who move to Big City to live with Gramma Alice, and struggle to adjust to city life. A minor subplot for this season is Cricket getting a job at Big Coffee to pay off the damages he caused from a Critterball game and forming a bond with its head barista Gloria.

The series features the voices of Chris Houghton, Marieve Herington, Bob Joles, and Artemis Pebdani. Guest stars in this season include Jon Hamm, Raven-Symoné, Busta Rhymes, Danny Trejo, Jim Rash, Lorraine Toussaint and Paul F. Tompkins.

== Production ==
Big City Greens was picked up for its first season on March 4, 2016, under the working title of Country Club. The series was later renamed Big City Greens on July 21, 2017. During production, "Hands-On History", an episode originally intended to be the tenth of this season which focused on Remy was cut, but was later revived as the episode "Rehashed History" in Season 4.

Season 1 of Big City Greens is arranged on Disney+ to create a proper continuity.

== Episodes ==
The episodes are ordered by their original broadcast order, not their production order or chronological order on Disney+.

No. overall	No. in season	Title	Directed by	Written and storyboarded by	Story by	Original release date	Prod. code	U.S. viewers (millions)
1	1	"Space Chicken"	Chris & Shane Houghton	Written by : Chris & Shane Houghton; Storyboarded by : Chris Houghton	Chris & Shane Houghton	June 18, 2018	101	0.68
1	1	"Steak Night"	Monica Ray	Cheyenne Curtis & Caldwell Tanner	Kylie Condon	June 18, 2018	101	0.68
"Space Chicken": Upon moving into their new home in Big City, Cricket sets out to launch a chicken into space in an effort to leave an impression on his neighbors. He recruits his strange sister Tilly and new city friend Remy to help in his endeavor. However, with every effort he tries, he seems to instead make his father Bill look bad in their eyes. "Steak Night": The Greens pick up steak for their tradition Steak Night, but while taking the subway back home, Cricket accidentally leaves the steak back at the waiting station. Not wanting to have their first night ruined, Cricket drags his family all throughout the different stops in an effort to save their dinner. Guest stars: Zeno Robinson as Remy, Anna Akana as Gloria
2	2	"Cricket Versus"	Matt Braly	Amy Hudkins & Jonathan Wallach	Shane Houghton	June 19, 2018	102	0.63
2	2	"Blue Tater"	Monica Ray	Aaron Austin & Chris Pianka	Michael McCafferty	June 19, 2018	102	0.63
"Cricket Versus": Cricket is tasked with wrestling a wild animal to complete a Green family rite of passage, but renounces his family name when he fails to find any vicious creatures in the city… or does he? "Blue Tater": Cricket convinces Bill to turn his pick up truck into a French fry food truck for a Food Truck Round-Up, but after Cricket harvests an unusual blue potato that Gramma recognizes as part of a curse that caused farmers to become unlucky, Cricket becomes paranoid thinking he cursed the family with bad luck. Their day is tarnished by a series of unfortunate events as Cricket tries to protect the family, and soon Bill believes the family is cursed as well. However, Tilly does not fall for the "curse" and tells Cricket the bad luck was all because of his doings, and people are not controlled by luck. Feeling better, Cricket successfully gets the family to the Round-Up, and the blue potato is sliced and turned into an additional entry of theirs with no harm done. Guest stars: Anna Akana as Gloria, Andy Daly as Officer Keys
3	3	"Swimming Fool"	Matt Braly & Tiffany Ford	Charlie Gavin & Anna O'Brian	Carson Montgomery	June 20, 2018	103	0.66
3	3	"Tilly's Goat"	Matt Braly	Amy Hudkins & Jonathan Wallach	Carson Montgomery	June 20, 2018	103	0.66
"Swimming Fool": When the Greens visit an indoor pool, Cricket becomes accustomed to the pool's high dive, but when he attempts to try it, he gets scared and develops a fear of jumping off. Meanwhile, Bill's swimming trunks are sucked up by the jacuzzi vacuum and tries to prevent the poolgoers from seeing him naked, Tilly tries to retrieve Bill's car keys from the pool floor, and Gramma's attempts at sunbathing are interrupted by the children. In the end, every problem is solved and Cricket learns from Bill about the importance of having courage, and thus gets over his fear and completes his dive. "Tilly's Goat": When Melissa the goat does not give enough milk, Tilly thinks she has the spirit of a dog and decides to enter her in the Big City Dog Show that day. Not wanting Tilly to embarrass herself because Melissa does not look and act like the other dogs, Cricket and Remy attempt to save her by meddling in with the entries. They end up messing up the show and Tilly tells Cricket she knew everyone was laughing at her but didn't mind and was just having fun. Melissa then proves herself by saving one of the judge's dogs, and despite not winning afterward, she is given an honorary award and Cricket apologizes to Tilly for not trusting her. Guest stars Zeno Robinson as Remy, Dee Bradley Baker as Melissa and Announcer, Jorge Diaz as Carlos, Colton Dunn as Brett, Kirby Howell-Baptiste as Judge Uppinsbottom, Monica Ray as Kiki, Luke Lowe as Benny
4	4	"Cricketsitter"	Monica Ray	Charlie Gavin & Anna O'Brian	Jennifer Keene	June 21, 2018	106	0.79
4	4	"Backflip Bill"	Monica Ray	Amy Hudkins & Jonathan Wallach	Kenny Byerly & Kylie Condon	June 21, 2018	106	0.79
"Cricketsitter": While Bill takes Gramma to the doctor for a checkup, Tilly is given the task of babysitting Cricket for the time period. While Cricket is checking off his list of things to do with a bucket, Tilly sabotages one of Cricket's to-dos, and ends up dislocating one of his arm joints. "Backflip Bill": Cricket convinces Bill to follow his childhood dream of becoming a gymnast, but Bill is put a bit under pressure under some mild trauma from when Gramma was coaching Bill, during those childhood dreams. Guest stars: Brian George as Doctor, Vladimir Caamaño as Juan Pablo
5	5	"Gramma's License"	Matt Braly & Tiffany Ford	Cheyenne Curtis & Caldwell Tanner	Kenny Byerly	June 22, 2018	104	0.73
5	5	"Bear Trapped"	Chris Houghton	Matt Braly & Monica Ray	Carson Montgomery	June 22, 2018	104	0.73
"Gramma's License": Cricket and Tilly help Gramma practice for her driver's test, after she learns her current license is expired. "Bear Trapped": Cricket, Tilly and Remy befriend a bear that's loose in the city and try to protect it from Officer Keys and animal control. Guest stars: Zeno Robinson as Remy, Andy Daly as Officer Keys, Luke Lowe as Benny, Fred Tatasciore as Daisy
6	6	"Photo Op"	Tiffany Ford	Charlie Gavin & Anna O'Brian	Carson Montgomery	June 25, 2018	108	0.72
6	6	"Remy Rescue"	Monica Ray	Ben Adams & Rebecca Schauer	Kenny Byerly	June 25, 2018	108	0.72
"Photo Op": Bill takes the family to the mall under the pretense of going to the food court but is actually hoping to have a family photo taken, much to the rest of the Greens' dismay. "Remy Rescue": Remy's parents learn that he has been skipping his violin lessons to hang out with Cricket, and threaten to end their friendship by sending Remy to boarding school, so Cricket does the best he can to stop them and keep him and Remy's friendship tied. Guest stars: Zeno Robinson as Remy, Lorraine Toussaint as Rashida Remington, Colton Dunn as Russell Remington, Danny Trejo as Vasquez, Luke Lowe as Benny
7	7	"Gridlocked"	Monica Ray	Cheyenne Curtis & Caldwell Tanner	Shane Houghton	June 27, 2018	105	0.73
7	7	"Mama Bird"	Tiffany Ford	Amy Hudkins & Jonathan Wallach	Jennifer Keene	June 27, 2018	105	0.73
"Gridlocked": Feeling smothered by city life, Bill decides to take the family on a day trip to the country only to become trapped in a massive traffic jam. Meanwhile, Gramma gets herself her own personal radio DJ, Tilly washes cars, and Cricket gets chased around over a big misunderstanding. "Mama Bird": Tilly finds an abandoned bird nest in the yard and decides to take care of the chicks, only to become jealous when they take a liking to Cricket instead of her, which drives Tilly to deprivation. Guest stars: Anna Akana as Gloria, Andy Daly as Officer Keys, Scott Aukerman as Radio DJ, John DiMaggio as Truck Driver
8	8	"Welcome Home"	Matt Braly	Chris Houghton	Shane Houghton	July 2, 2018	107	0.67
8	8	"Raccooned"	Monica Ray	Aaron Austin, Monica Ekabutr & Chris Pianka	Shane Houghton	July 2, 2018	107	0.67
"Welcome Home": After losing the family farm in this origin episode, Bill, Cricket and Tilly move to Big City to live with Gramma and have a series of misadventures when their pickup truck and all of their belongings are towed away. "Raccooned": A family of raccoons take over the house after Bill and Cricket fetch Gramma's teddy bear in the garage when they accidentally disturb the nest of raccoons inside. The family scrambles to get the raccoons to leave the house, but Cricket and Bill's constant arguing keeps making everything worse. Guest star: Dee Bradley Baker as Raccoons
9	9	"Fill Bill"	Monica Ray	Aaron Austin & Chris Pianka	Kenny Byerly & Jennifer Keene	July 9, 2018 (Note: On Disney Channel in Germany, "Fill Bill" aired on July 5, 2018, and "Critterball Crisis" aired on July 6, 2018.)	109	0.67
9	9	"Critterball Crisis"	Monica Ray	Ben Adams & Rebecca Schauer	Kenny Byerly	July 9, 2018	109	0.67
"Fill Bill": Bill tries to prove that he is a real citizen of Big City when the family dines at a fancy seafood restaurant while Cricket and Tilly make it their mission to liberate the restaurant's octopuses. Gramma breaks the tank, making the Greens get indefinitely banned from the seafood restaurant. "Critterball Crisis": Gloria confiscates Cricket's critterballs after he kicks them over the fence into the neighbouring cafe and he schemes to get them back with Tilly and Remy's help. While doing so, Cricket discovers Gloria is working at the cafe to raise money for a trip to Paris, and in return accidentally destroys her model of the Eiffel Tower. When Gloria is pulled into the game and easily defeats the kids, she is approached by her boss Ms. Cho and threatens to fire her, and Cricket realizes how important Gloria's job is and apologizes for causing it. Ms. Cho forgives Gloria and makes Cricket her co-worker to pay off the damage. Guest stars: Zeno Robinson as Remy, Anna Akana as Gloria, Colton Dunn as Brett, John Early as Alexander, Jim Rash as Waiter, Busta Rhymes as Fish
10	10	"Parade Day"	Monica Ray	Cheyenne Curtis & Caldwell Tanner	Kenny Byerly	July 11, 2018	110	0.66
10	10	"DIY Guys"	Monica Ray	Amy Hudkins & Jonathan Wallach	Carson Montgomery	July 11, 2018	110	0.66
"Parade Day": Cricket begins his part time job at Big Coffee to pay off the damages he caused in the previous episode but is more interested in sneaking out to attend the Big City Parade than he is in working. "DIY Guys": Bill teaches Remy how to be self reliant when the family heads to a gigantic hardware store to find a replacement part for their broken vacuum cleaner. Guest stars: Zeno Robinson as Remy, Anna Akana as Gloria, Andy Daly as Officer Keys
11	11	"Gargoyle Gals"	Anna O'Brian	Charlie Gavin & Anna O'Brian	Kenny Byerly	July 16, 2018	111	0.59
11	11	"Supermarket Scandal"	Matt Braly & Tiffany Ford	Ben Adams & Rebecca Schauer	Kenny Byerly	July 16, 2018	111	0.59
"Gargoyle Gals": Tilly makes friends with a insanely ideal theorist who names herself Andromeda, and Tilly plays along with her lifestyle. "Supermarket Scandal": The Greens open up their food stand at the Farmer's Market, but they are low on supplies, so Cricket gets the idea of making artificially-crafted food to compensate which he sells to Wholesome Foods manager Chip Whistler. However, Bill warns Cricket that whoever eats the fake produce will turn against them and ruin their reputation, and they retrieve all the fake produce while Cricket was forced to pay for them with all the money he got as a bonus. In the end they manage to sell the fake produce honestly, but Chip unknowingly eats one of them against Cricket's warnings, chipping his tooth and vowing payback on the family. Guest stars: Zeno Robinson as Remy, Dee Bradley Baker as Phoenix, Luke Lowe as Benny, Paul Scheer as Chip Whistler, Andy Daly as Officer Keys, Nicole Byer as Andromeda
12	12	"Barry Cuda"	Matt Braly & Tiffany Ford	Aaron Austin & Chris Pianka	Carson Montgomery	July 18, 2018	112	0.59
12	12	"Suite Retreat"	Tiffany Ford	Ben Adams & Rebecca Schauer	Jennifer Keene	July 18, 2018	112	0.59
"Barry Cuda": Cricket uses his hard earned $10 on a singing fish decor, and he won't stop playing it. Soon to find Barry was axed, Cricket seeks to find who killed his first spend. "Suite Retreat": Gramma gets fed up with the Greens ruining her peaceful moments, so she has them spend a day at a hotel, so she can finally get some peace and quiet. She soon finds that it is more lonely than she thought, so she then tries to sabotage the Greens' hotel stay. Guest stars: Zeno Robinson as Remy, Dee Bradley Baker as Phoenix, John Early as Alexander
13	13	"Family Legacy"	Natasha Kline	Cheyenne Curtis & Caldwell Tanner	Kenny Byerly & Michael McCafferty	July 23, 2018	113	0.60
13	13	"Paint Misbehavin'"	Chris Houghton	Katie Aldworth & Rebecca Schauer	Jennifer Keene	July 23, 2018	113	0.60
"Family Legacy": Cricket and Tilly guide Gramma through a riddle she has been trying to solve for years, but as it turns out, the answers were in the legacy left by ancestors of the Green family's past generations. "Paint Misbehavin": During work at Big Coffee, Cricket finds that Gloria has not sold a single piece of art yet, so Cricket draws some scribbles on them, and they soon find that the two have a powerful spark of synergy. Guest stars: Anna Akana as Gloria, Grey Griffin as Vuka
14	14	"Rated Cricket"	Natasha Kline	Aaron Austin & Chris Pianka	Carson Montgomery	July 25, 2018	114	0.57
14	14	"Homeshare Hoedown"	Monica Ray	Katie Aldworth & Rebecca Schauer	Jennifer Keene	July 25, 2018	114	0.57
"Rated Cricket": Instead of going to see Croblins 2 with the rest of his family, Cricket, thinking he's more mature than he seems, wants to see the adult romance flick Kiss of Death, believing it to be a horror movie that he finds fun. But once he gets into the movie, he realizes it wasn't anything it imagined. Meanwhile, Gramma tries to find the best seats in the theater, Bill helps the snack vendor make the perfect popcorn, and Tilly thinks she has been transported to an alternate universe when she puts on 3D glasses. "Homeshare Hoedown": Gloria tells Cricket about a site called "Share BnB", and sets Cricket up with two roommates to spend the night at the Cricket residence, despite Bill warning him that the job is not easy and he has to commit to it. Sadly for Cricket, the new guests' adolescence for authenticity drives Cricket to insanity. Guest stars: Anna Akana as Gloria, Scott Menville as Jace, Paul F. Tompkins as Justin, Lauren Lapkus as Val, Luke Lowe as Benny
15	15	"Cricket's Shoes"	Natasha Kline	Cheyenne Curtis & Caldwell Tanner	Shane Houghton	July 30, 2018	116	0.62
15	15	"Feud Fight"	Natasha Kline	Amy Hudkins & Jonathan Wallach	Kenny Byerly & Michael McCafferty	July 30, 2018	116	0.62
"Cricket's Shoes": Cricket comes down ill after sharing a popsicle with his dog, Phoenix, so he has his family to fill in his shoes. "Feud Fight": Chip Whistler returns, bringing Wholesome Foods to the outdoor food market, as he drags customers in with many marketing ploys, and Cricket destines to foil his plot. Meanwhile, Gramma goes looking for the spiciest pepper for her 10-Alarm chili. Guest stars: Zeno Robinson as Remy, Anna Akana as Gloria, Paul Scheer as Chip Whistler, Griffin McElroy as Pepper Merchant, Monica Ray as Kiki, Luke Lowe as Benny, Lamar Woods as Weezie
16	16	"Breaking News"	Natasha Kline	Charlie Gavin & Anna O'Brian	Carson Montgomery	August 1, 2018	117	0.65
16	16	"Cyberbullies"	Monica Ray	Aaron Austin & Chris Pianka	Kenny Byerly	August 1, 2018	117	0.65
"Breaking News": In an attempt to give the news' coverage of Bill's gigantic Watermelon a bit of zest, it ends up being a cover story of Cricket himself. After knowing of this, Cricket sees to it that he gives Bill's watermelon the kudos it deserves. "Cyberbullies": After Cricket refuses to give the Cyber Knights, the most feared trio of the online community, his Spacecoins, the Cyber Knights start tormenting Cricket's friends' technological platforms and it is up to Cricket to fight back for their proper solitude. Guest stars: Zeno Robinson as Remy, Raven-Symoné as Maria Media, Jessica McKenna as Cyber Knight Leader, Luke Lowe as Benny, Lamar Woods as Weezie, Monica Ray as Kiki
17	17	"Tilly Tour"	Monica Ray	Amy Hudkins & Jonathan Wallach	Jennifer Keene	August 6, 2018	118	0.63
17	17	"Dinner Party"	Natasha Kline	Katie Aldworth & Rebecca Schauer	Kenny Byerly & Michael McCafferty	August 6, 2018	118	0.63
"Tilly Tour": Tilly takes Gramma out on a tour to see Big City's famous landmarks, but Gramma isn't impressed with any of it, and it gives her bad memories of when Gramma's farm was infested by the self-titled Big City, so Tilly instead takes her to the places Tilly is the most fond of. Meanwhile, Bill and Cricket try to repair the bathroom. "Dinner Party": In an attempt for Remy to spend more time with Cricket, the Greens invite his parents over for dinner. Yet, the different lifestyles of the Remingtons don't make things better, boiling down to a rainy Touch Football showdown. Guest stars: Zeno Robinson as Remy, Dee Bradley Baker as Melissa, Lorraine Toussaint as Rashida Remington, Colton Dunn as Russell Remington
18	18	"Coffee Quest"	Natasha Kline	Written by : Kenny Byerly; Storyboarded by : Aaron Austin & Chris Pianka	Kenny Byerly	August 8, 2018	120	0.63
18	18	"Phoenix Rises"	Monica Ray	Katie Aldworth & Rebecca Schauer	Shane Houghton	August 8, 2018	120	0.63
"Coffee Quest": Cricket and Gloria are sent by their boss, Ms. Cho, to restock on Big Coffee's coffee bean supply, so that Cricket's debt can be fully paid off. Unluckily, the last bag is in possession of Chip Whistler and he's not gonna go down easily. Along the way, Cricket discovers Gloria is not from Big City and moved from the suburbs. In the end, they successfully get the beans to the cafe, but Cricket does not want to leave Gloria and she causes bigger debt, while Chip promises to run Cricket and his family out of Big City someday. "Phoenix Rises": Phoenix, Cricket's frail red dog, catches a familiar whiff, and goes sniffing for it. This worries the Green family, as they go looking for their dog, thinking he got lost, or kidnapped, at worst. Also in a plot twist, Cricket and Tilly's mom Nancy Green returns upon been released from prison. Guest stars: Wendi McLendon-Covey as Nancy Green, Zeno Robinson as Remy, Anna Akana as Gloria, Shane Houghton as Greg, Paul Scheer as Chip Whistler, Dee Bradley Baker as Phoenix Melissa
19	19	"Blood Moon"	Monica Ray	Charlie Gavin, Amy Hudkins, Anna O'Brian & Jonathan Wallach	Carson Montgomery	October 6, 2018	115	0.54
In this full half hour special, the Green family prepare for Halloween, but Gramma warns of the Blood Moon, an event where all the animals suddenly become blood thirsty beasts. True to her word, the animals suddenly become violent and trap the Greens, Remy, Vasquez and Gloria in the house while Halloween is going on. Eventually, everything spirals out of control when they learn how the animals escaped their confinement and why. Meanwhile, Remy is angry when Vasquez wears the same hot dog costume as his and accuses him of stealing it, only to realize that Vasquez dresses as a hot dog every year. Guest stars: Zeno Robinson as Remy, Anna Akana as Gloria, Danny Trejo as Vasquez, Colton Dunn as Brett, Dee Bradley Baker as Zombie Farm Animals
20	20	"Big Deal"	Monica Ray	Kiana Khansmith & Caldwell Tanner	Carson Montgomery	November 3, 2018	119	0.56
20	20	"Forbidden Feline"	Monica Ray	Ian Mutchler & Rebecca Schauer	Jennifer Keene	November 3, 2018	119	0.56
"Big Deal": On Thanksgiving, the Greens spot an ad for low prices for TVs at Price Busters. At Cricket's urging, the family goes shopping for a new TV, but quickly learn that the store's manager Louis lowers the price so that he can watch shoppers furiously fight one another over items. Soon the rest of the Greens are pulled into the riot, and Cricket realizes the true meaning of Thanksgiving when Louis reveals he is forced to work on Thanksgiving every year and hosts the sales to get the shoppers to see the pain that it feels. "Forbidden Feline": Tilly becomes friends with Anoush, the neighborhood cat, only to learn that he belongs to Gramma's neighbor/arch-enemy Mr. Grigorian. He forbids the two to play with one another forcing Tilly to go and rescue her new feline friend. Guest stars: Jon Hamm as Louis, Maurice LaMarche as Mr. Grigorian, Dee Bradley Baker as Anoush
21	21	"Uncaged"	Natasha Kline	Charlie Gavin, Amy Hudkins, Anna O'Brian & Jonathan Wallach	Kenny Byerly	January 11, 2019	121	0.93
Following "Phoenix Rises", Nancy reunites with her family. While Cricket and Tilly are happy to see her, Bill and Gramma are concerned that she will be a bad influence on the kids. Cricket is bothered by being called a "good kid" by Nancy and decides to impress her by having him and Tilly release an orangutan from the zoo. Unfortunately, they end up releasing all the animals who run amok all over Big City and now must work together to get them back while avoiding the jovially staunch Officer Keys. Guest stars: Wendi McLendon-Covey as Nancy Green, Zeno Robinson as Remy, Andy Daly as Officer Keys, Danny Trejo as Vasquez
22	22	"Harvest Dinner"	Natasha Kline	Amy Hudkins & Jonathan Wallach	Kenny Byerly	January 12, 2019	123	0.46
22	22	"Winner Winner"	Monica Ray	Caroline Director & Rebecca Schauer	Carson Montgomery	January 12, 2019	123	0.46
"Harvest Dinner": Bill sends Tilly to the grocery store to go and get paprika for his stew and asks Cricket and Gramma to watch a pie cooling in the windowsill. Feeling insulted for not being trusted, Gramma and Cricket rush out to try to beat Tilly at getting the ingredient but are soon outwitted and discover their job actually was important. Meanwhile, Bill and Nancy try working together in the kitchen, but their methods are too different. "Winner Winner": The Greens head to the community center so that Bill can get Gramma to try a boomba class. Tilly becomes fascinated with the trophy display and decides to earn one by working with the tough Community Sue and Cricket teams up with Remy, Kiki and Benny to see where a mysterious inaccessible door leads. Guest stars: Wendi McLendon-Covey as Nancy Green, Fred Tatasciore as Daisy, Zeno Robinson as Remy, Monica Ray as Kiki, Betsy Sodaro as Community Sue, Vladimir Caamaño as Juan Pablo, Luke Lowe as Benny
23	23	"Night Bill"	Natasha Kline	Cheyenne Curtis & Caldwell Tanner	Michael McCafferty	January 19, 2019	122	0.51
23	23	"Cheap Snake"	Monica Ray	Charlie Gavin & Anna O'Brian	Carson Montgomery	January 19, 2019	122	0.51
"Night Bill": Cricket and Tilly begin noticing that Bill is buying them expensive things and he keeps showing up at home very tired and sleepy. They follow him out one night and discover that he is now working at a call in center for energy drinks. Now, Cricket and Tilly must race Bill's new boss to free their dad. "Cheap Snake": Cricket is tired of having to plan things and convinces Remy that they need to do something radical and immediate. Cricket ends up buying a snake, named Snakey, who ends up becoming too much of a hassle for him. Cricket refuses to give up Snakey at the behest of Remy and Tilly until he begins eating the farm animals. Guest stars: Zeno Robinson as Remy, Anna Akana as Gloria, Wallace Shawn as Jyle
24	24	"Hiya Henry"	Natasha Kline	Charlie Gavin & Anna O'Brian	Lacy Dyer & Julia Layton	January 26, 2019	124	0.57
24	24	"People Watching"	Monica Ray	Caldwell Tanner & Kiana Khansmith	Lacy Dyer & Julia Layton	January 26, 2019	124	0.57
"Hiya Henry": Big Coffee is hosting an open mic and Cricket convinces Tilly to join. She ends up finding Gramma's ventriloquist dummy, Hiya Henry. Everyone loves Henry except for Cricket who cannot stand its off-putting appearance and small doll hands, but he cannot bring herself to tell Tilly he hates it at risk hurting her feelings. When his attempts to ignore and get rid of the dummy fail, he ends up destroying it onstage in the middle of her act, shocking the audience and disappointing Tilly anyway, leaving her with no act. Realizing what he did, Cricket apologizes for not telling Tilly her fear and becomes a lifelike dummy himself so she can finish her act. "People Watching": The whole Green Family is relaxing out in the streets of Big City watching strangers pass by. Nancy then suggests that they play the people watching game where they spot a stranger and make up stories about them. Everyone is having fun except for Bill who cannot come up with anything creative and just bores the family. Guest stars: Wendi McLendon-Covey as Nancy Green, Zeno Robinson as Remy, Anna Akana as Gloria
25	25	"Valentine's Dance"	Natasha Kline	Amy Hudkins & Jonathan Wallach	Kenny Byerly	February 2, 2019	127	0.62
25	25	"Green Streets"	Monica Ray	Megan Boyd & Rebecca Schauer	Lacy Dyer & Julia Layton	February 2, 2019	127	0.62
"Valentine's Dance": It is Valentine's Day and everyone is falling in love, except for Cricket who despises romance. However, things change when he spots a girl named Gabriella who wants to dance with him, and suddenly cannot stop thinking about her. Meanwhile, Tilly tries to become Cupid and Nancy and Gramma start disagreeing over their chaperoning skills. "Green Street": Cricket is frustrated by the garbage he finds lying around on his street and enlists the help of Officer Keys to apprehend the litter bug. Cricket decides to change Keys to his usual cheery self into a serious and tough cop, but unfortunately Keys goes after him when he turns out to be the litter bug culprit. Guest stars: Wendi McLendon-Covey as Nancy Green, Zeno Robinson as Remy, Anna Akana as Gloria, Scott Menville as Jace, Andy Daly as Officer Keys, Luke Lowe as Benny, Lamar Woods as Weezie, Betsy Sodaro as Community Sue, Jenna Ortega as Gabriella
26	26	"Hurty Tooth"	Monica Ray	Megan Boyd & Rebecca Schauer	Chris Houghton	February 9, 2019	125	0.60
26	26	"Sleepover Sisters"	Natasha Kline	Amy Hudkins & Jonathan Wallach	Lacy Dyer & Julia Layton	February 9, 2019	125	0.60
"Hurty Tooth": Cricket's tooth begins hurting, so Bill drags him and Tilly to the dentist to get a check up. Cricket refuses to get his tooth pulled by Dr. Enamel in accords to Gramma's usual accusations. Meanwhile, Tilly tries to get a tooth for the tooth fairy and Bill tries to spot the difference in a magazine. "Sleepover Sisters": Tilly and Andromeda want to feel closer so they have a sleepover at the latter's house. Upon reading a story, the two decide to stay up late at night to acquire psychic powers. This leaves Cricket to have the bedroom to himself, but he finds he cannot sleep without Tilly's snoring. Guest stars: Nicole Byer as Andromeda, Paul F. Tompkins as Tooth Fairy, Luke Lowe as Benny, Eric Jacobson performing Fozzie Bear as Dr. Enamel and "Fozzie Bear's Personal Handyman"
27	27	"Trailer Trouble"	Monica Ray	Kiana Khansmith & Caldwell Tanner	Carson Montgomery	February 16, 2019	126	0.54
27	27	"Mansion Madness"	Natasha Kline	Charlie Gavin & Anna O'Brian	Carson Montgomery	February 16, 2019	126	0.54
"Trailer Trouble": Cricket and Tilly head to Nancy's for Mom Night where they can have as much fun as they want. However, Nancy's old biker gang, the Stingers, arrive and steal her trailer for betraying them. Now, Nancy, Cricket and Tilly must race their leader, Skids, for the return of Nancy's only home. "Mansion Madness": While Remy is away with his family, Cricket is tasked with feeding Snakey. The rest of the Greens come and decide to make themselves at home, but get into trouble when Tilly poses as a rich heiress for the neighbors, Bill goes for a joyride in a jalopy and Gramma gets lost in the mansion's long hallways. Guest Stars: Wendi McLendon-Covey as Nancy Green, Zeno Robinson as Remy, Colton Dunn as Russell Remington Lord Chrome, Lorraine Toussaint as Rashida Remington, Marieve Herington as Leadfoot, Tom Kenny as Dan, Lauren Lapkus as Rich Lady
28	28	"Park Pandemonium"	Natasha Kline	Charlie Gavin & Anna O'Brian	Lacy Dyer & Julia Layton	February 23, 2019	128	0.54
28	28	"Cricket's Biscuits"	Monica Ray	Kiana Khansmith & Caldwell Tanner	Carson Montgomery	February 23, 2019	128	0.54
"Park Pandemonium": When Gramma abandons Tilly at the park, it becomes granddaughter versus grandma in a battle of pride as they try to make the other jealous with replacements. Meanwhile, Bill tries to be cool with a couple of youths and Cricket teams up with a playground designer to make the most dangerous playground. "Cricket's Biscuits": After Cricket and Tilly get injured, Gramma makes her famous Feel Better Biscuits which immediately make the kids feel good. They want more, but Gramma refuses. Bill tells them that she only makes them when they are injured. After failing to fool Gramma, they decide to outright steal the recipe. Guest Stars: Andy Daly as Officer Keys, Alex Hirsch as Wyatt
29	29	"Skunked"	Monica Ray	Kiana Khansmith & Caldwell Tanner	Shane Houghton	March 2, 2019	129	0.52
29	29	"Axin' Saxon"	Natasha Kline	Amy Hudkins & Jonathan Wallach	Lacy Dyer & Julia Layton	March 2, 2019	129	0.52
"Skunked": As the patrons of Big Coffee celebrate their local hero Mark, Cricket plots to become a hero himself. He gathers a trio of skunks to invade the café so that he can swoop in and save everyone from the stinky vermin. However, Cricket's plan does not go as planned and soon he puts himself and the patrons in danger. "Axin' Saxon": While Bill, Cricket and Remy go fishing, Nancy stays at home with Tilly to bond with her. Things go horribly wrong when Nancy accidentally destroys Saxon, Tilly's sack doll, in the wash. Believing that Gramma is to blame, Tilly seeks revenge on her while Nancy struggles to tell Tilly the truth. Guest stars: Wendi McLendon-Covey as Nancy Green, Zeno Robinson as Remy, Anna Akana as Gloria, Andy Daly as Officer Keys, Colin Hanks as Mark, Elizabeth Hanks as Angelina, Dee Bradley Baker as Skunks
30	30	"Cricket's Place"	Natasha Kline	Charlie Gavin & Anna O'Brian	Carson Montgomery	March 9, 2019	130	0.61
30	30	"Volunteer Tilly"	Monica Ray	Megan Boyd & Rebecca Schauer	Lacy Dyer & Julia Layton	March 9, 2019	130	0.61
"Cricket's Place": Cricket narrates a story about when he and Remy got fed up with being told what to do by grownups. They decide to purchase an apartment (situated next to the Green residence) and do nothing but throw parties every day. However, Cricket and Remy begin to see that living by oneself with no discipline is not the greatest. "Volunteer Tilly": Tilly is invited by Brett to volunteer at the animal shelter and starts living in paradise with the numerous animals that stay there. However, she cannot resist the temptation of keeping the pets to herself especially when people come to adopt them. Meanwhile, Cricket and Gramma pull pranks on Bill. Guest stars: Wendi McLendon-Covey as Nancy Green, Zeno Robinson as Remy, Colton Dunn as Brett, Maurice LaMarche as Mr. Grigorian, Luke Lowe as Benny, Monica Ray as Kiki, Lamar Woods as Weezie, Danny Trejo as Vasquez, Dee Bradley Baker as Ivanhoe
