= Cricket Green =

Big City Greens character

- Big City Greens character
- First appearance: "Space Chicken"; June 18, 2018
- Created by: Chris and Shane Houghton
- Based on: Chris Houghton as a child
- Voiced by: Chris Houghton

Character Information
- Full name: Cricket Ernest Green
- Nickname: Crickey
- Gender: Male
- Occupation: Employee at Big Coffee ("Critterball Crisis" to "Chipwrecked"); Employee at Gloria + Green Café (since "Gloria's Café"); Worker at Green Family Farms
- Family: Bill Green (father); Nancy Green (mother); Tilly Green (older sister)
- Significant others: Gabriella Espinosa (ex-girlfriend)
- Relatives: Alice and Ernest Green (paternal grandparents; latter is deceased); Nick Mulligan (maternal grandfather)
- Nationality: American

Cricket Ernest Green is a fictional character and the central protagonist of the American animated television series Big City Greens, created by the Houghton Brothers (Chris and Shane Houghton). He is a 10-year-old country boy and the only son of Bill and Nancy Green, the younger brother of Tilly Green, and grandson of Alice Green, the deceased Ernest Green, and Nick Mulligan. He is voiced by series co-creator Chris Houghton and first appeared in the series premiere "Space Chicken", on June 18, 2018.

== Character ==
=== Concept and creation ===
Cricket is directly based on Chris Houghton as a young child. His signature haircut mirrors the exact hairstyle Chris wore for many years growing up. The name "Cricket" comes from a nickname Chris encouraged his classmates to call him, though it never caught on back then. His signature exclamation, "Bingo! Bango!", was a phrase Chris frequently used while storyboarding on the animated series Harvey Beaks (2015–2017). His personality was meant to reflect how Chris Houghton was as a child, excluding the misbehaving.

During early development, Cricket was originally meant to be named "Bucket". This was ultimately changed to avoid naming conflicts with another Disney project, Kirby Buckets. The visual design of Cricket and the rest of the cast was heavily influenced by the aesthetic of The Muppets, aiming for a fun, friendly, and "poppy" look crafted by the Houghton Brothers.

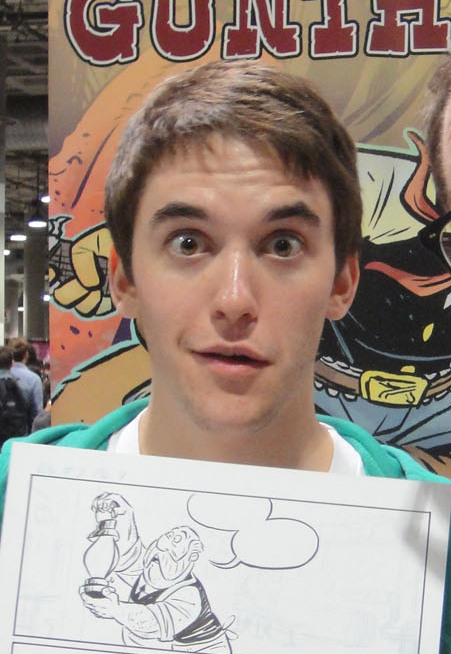
Chris Houghton voices Cricket Green.

=== Voice ===
Cricket is voiced by Chris Houghton. According to Houghton, Cricket's voice just came naturally.

== Role ==
Cricket Green is a mischievous, energetic, and optimistic 10-year-old country boy. As depicted in "Welcome Home", (Note: "Welcome Home" is the 1st segment of the 8th episode of Big City Greens, though is chronologically the first episode of the series.) he and his family move from their home in the country to Big City to live with Gramma Alice. This factor of the series was meant to reflect the Houghton brothers moving from their hometown of St. Johns, Michigan to Los Angeles, California.

Cricket is a character whose curiosity and desire for fun lead him into misadventures. Despite his chaotic nature and habit of ignoring rules, Cricket has a good heart and loves his family and friends like Remy. He adapts to city life with enthusiasm, turning everyday locations into playgrounds and facing local rivals like Chip Whistler with confidence.

== Fictional character biography ==
The second child in the Green family, Cricket was born 2 or 3 years after Tilly in Smalton to parents Bill and Nancy Green, his birth being unplanned, striking panic for Bill at first. In his early years, Cricket was bored on the farm. Therefore, his sister Tilly created a persona: Jilly, to which he was immediately astonished by.

One day, Bill announced that he was moving the family to Big City. Cricket and Tilly were not happy about this and Cricket tried desperately to stay. However, Bill confirmed they were leaving due to being outcompeted by other farms, as well as bills piling up. Though Cricket was still hesitant to leave, Bill gave Cricket a jar of dirt to remind him that the country is part of him. Ultimately, he and his family move to Big City. Though, it took a struggle before they finally reached Alice's house.

After the move, Cricket wants to make a good impression and so he gets the idea to launch a chicken into space with the help of Tilly and a random kid Remy, the latter becoming Cricket's best friend. Sometime later, Cricket earns the Green family name by taking down his grandmother Alice for the Green Family Rite of Passage. Later one day, Cricket faces his fear of heights when he goes to the pool one day, falling from a height higher than the high dive, earning the respect of the other kids there; notably, Benny, Weezie and Kiki, who later befriend Cricket.

Cricket would soon find himself working at Big Coffee to pay off a massive amount of damage he had caused there, forming a strong bond with Gloria over time. At a Valentine's Day dance, Cricket gains a crush on a girl Gabriella, though struggles to muster up the courage to dance with her. By the time he does, Remy had already stolen the spot. Ever since that day, Cricket has been lovestruck. Remy pushes him to talk to her, wanting to help him out for once. Though, when Gabriella announces she's going to Montreal, he panics and, with the help of Vasquez and Remy, catches her bus to express his feelings, to which she reciprocated; therefore, they began dating.

== Personality ==
Cricket is portrayed as an optimistic and rambunctious child whose curiosity and desire for adventure brings him and his family on wild adventures. He is the main troublemaker of the Green family, prone to causing chaos and destruction, often causing unrest within the family. However, despite this, he doesn't always have malicious intent. He also loves to pull pranks, formerly with his ex-girlfriend Gabriella, and as revealed in "April Fool", it was their way of affection. Per "People Watching" and "Animation Abomination", he loves explosions.

Despite his usual reckless personality, he can also be responsible when he needs to be, often taking accountability for his selfish actions and trying to make them right. For example, in "Wishing Well", Cricket makes a wishing well to cash in on people making wishes, and when Tilly dumps her life savings into it only to find out her wish wasn't coming true (to feel a rainbow), he makes it come true on his own.

He is almost always barefoot, which is one of his personal convictions as seen in "No Service". Said episode, as well as "Cyberbullies", shows that he will often stand up for whatever he believes in. As revealed in "Rat Tail", he likes to express himself and is also perceptive to subliminal messaging. While not always the voice of reason, at certain times he knows he has to be, such as in "Gargoyle Gals" and "Broken Karted".

He really cares about his older sister Tilly and, as revealed in "Green Trial", the two have a "sibling code" only to be invoked in the direst of situations. As revealed in "Cheap Snake", he doesn't like to make plans and would rather not think about them, though learns that it's better to have one later. In "Wild Side", it is revealed that Cricket gets an annual "wild urge" Bill refers to as "the itch" that isn't satiated unless he is taken camping in the woods. In "Chip's Revenge", it is revealed that Cricket, when enraged, can receive massive strength. Cricket also has rare moments of vulnerability, such as when he loses his beloved dog Phoenix in "Phoenix Rises".

== Reception ==
Cricket has received a generally positive reception. According to Chris Houghton, he is often encouraged by fans to do Cricket's voice, and an official TikTok account for the character is available, ran by Houghton, using a puppet of the character. He has often been compared to Bart Simpson.

Common Sense Media reviewer Emily Ashby describes Cricket as an energetic and quirky kid whose enthusiasm for life leads to silly, wildly improbable adventures. Similarly, Laughing Place describes Cricket as "a 10-year-old boy who's curious, energetic, and always optimistic."

== See also ==
- List of Big City Greens characters
- List of barefooters
