= Big City Greens season 2 =

Big City Greens
- Season 2
- Promotional poster
- Starring: Chris Houghton; Marieve Herington; Bob Joles; Artemis Pebdani
- No. of episodes: 30 (58 segments)

Release
- Original network: Disney Channel
- Original release: November 16, 2019 – April 3, 2021

Season chronology
- ← Previous; Season 1 Next → Season 3

The second season of Big City Greens premiered on Disney Channel on November 16, 2019, and ended on April 3, 2021.

This season focuses on the adventures of Cricket Green and the rest of his family, who have since moved from the country to Big City to live with Alice Green, Cricket and Tilly's grandmother and Bill's mother. Two major arcs this season focus on Chip Whistler becoming the CEO of Wholesome Foods and plotting revenge on the Green family by destroying their home, and Gloria forming a strong relationship with the Greens prior to gaining her own café.

The series features the voices of Chris Houghton, Marieve Herington, Bob Joles, and Artemis Pebdani. Guest stars in this season include Karl-Anthony Towns, Alfred Molina, Thomas Middleditch, Jonathan Van Ness, Christopher Lloyd, Jameela Jamil, Lucy Lawless, Jim O'Heir, Ed Begley Jr., Cheri Oteri, Candace Kozak, Jason Maybaum, and SungWon Cho.

== Production ==
Big City Greens was renewed by Disney Channel for a second season on May 17, 2018, ahead of the first season's premiere. It was initially planned to premiere on November 4, 2019, but was pushed back two weeks later, on November 16. It aired thirty episodes.

== Episodes ==
The episodes are ordered by their original broadcast order, not their production order.

No. overall	No. in season	Title	Directed by	Written and storyboarded by	Story by	Original release date	Prod. code	U.S. viewers (millions)
31	1	"Cricket's Kapowie"	Natasha Kline	Amy Hudkins & Jonathan Wallach	Lacy Dyer & Julia Layton	November 16, 2019	201	0.54
31	1	"Car Trouble"	Natasha Kline	Charlie Gavin & Anna O'Brian	Lacy Dyer & Julia Layton	November 16, 2019	201	0.54
"Cricket's Kapowie": Ms. Cho invites her filmmaker friend Donny Tinselton to film a commercial for Big Coffee. He immediately singles out Cricket for having "Kapowie", which Cricket believes is accounted to his hair, but while trying to prepare for his role, Cricket accidentally shaves a large chunk of it, making him believe he lost his "Kapowie". Meanwhile, Tilly prepares for her role as "girl with a donut". "Car Trouble": Bill is given the chance to replace his truck with a futuristic car by Big Tech CEO Gwendolyn Zapp after the Greens realize that their old car is broken down. While they like the car, they admit that it is too perfect for them and rush to get their old truck back before Gwendolyn makes off with it to Mars. Guest stars: Jonathan Van Ness as Confident Stylist, Thomas Middleditch as Donny Tinselton, Luke Lowe as Benny, Anna Akana as Gloria, Cheri Oteri as Gwendolyn Zapp
32	2	"Urban Legend"	Natasha Kline	Monica Ray & Steve Wolfhard	Carson Montgomery	November 23, 2019	202	0.57
32	2	"Wishing Well"	Monica Ray	Chris Houghton & Natasha Kline	Carson Montgomery	November 23, 2019	202	0.57
"Urban Legend": Bill is disappointed to learn that Gramma intentionally scares the residents of Big City away from their house by claiming that she is a swamp witch. He decides to throw a barbecue along with Nancy and Tilly so as to invite the neighbors over. However, Gramma decides to amp up her fright level with the help of Cricket so as to keep them away for good, but it ends up going too far when the neighbors form an angry mob against the family. "Wishing Well": Cricket discovers wishing wells and decides to capitalize on it by making his own. When Tilly dumps her entire allowance, Cricket's shoulder angel and devil appear to try and coax him from one side to the other. Things are made more difficult when he comes clean to Tilly and learns what she wished for. Guest stars: Wendi McLendon-Covey as Nancy Green, Zeno Robinson as Remy, Andy Daly as Officer Keys
33	3	"Elevator Action"	Natasha Kline	Anna O'Brian	Kenny Byerly	November 30, 2019	204	0.58
33	3	"Bad Influencer"	Monica Ray	Kiana Khansmith & Caldwell Tanner	Kenny Byerly	November 30, 2019	204	0.58
"Elevator Action": While trying to move on with her life after noticing many (but not all) of her online friends achieving their goals, Gloria rushes to leave Big City once and for all, but while attempting to return her key to management, the Greens come along so that they can ride the elevator. Due to Cricket's influence, they get stuck, much to Gloria's horror. "Bad Influencer": Cricket is perplexed by Remy's sudden fascination with online media influencer Itchaboi who boasts money and status. When Cricket attempts to dissuade him from a shallow and arrogant lifestyle, Remy calls him a "hater" and decides to try to spend one million dollars on a cruise ticket. Cricket and Vasquez must team up to stop Remy. Meanwhile, Tilly films a grout video with Bill and enhances it to something the viewers want. Guest stars: Zeno Robinson as Remy, Anna Akana as Gloria, Luke Lowe as Benny, Danny Trejo as Vasquez, Lamar Woods as Weezie, Caldwell Tanner as Itchaboi
34	4	"Green Christmas"	Monica Ray	Amy Hudkins, Kiana Khansmith, Caldwell Tanner & Jonathan Wallach	Kenny Byerly	December 7, 2019	203	0.43
On Christmas Eve, the Green Family come together to celebrate their favorite holiday. However, Tilly informs Cricket that he has performed numerous misdeeds therefore putting him on the naughty list. He attempts to rectify this by visiting a mall store Santa, but when he causes more destruction, he opts to simply pull pranks so that no one else celebrates Christmas. However, Cricket's pranks accidentally frames Tilly, leading Tilly to end up on the naughty list as well and Cricket must pull a selfless act to save the holiday. Meanwhile, Nancy and Gramma realize that they did not get a gift for Bill and rush to get one for him. When a blizzard comes, Bill sets out to rescue his family. Guest stars: Wendi McLendon-Covey as Nancy Green, Luke Lowe as Benny, Dee Bradley Baker as Phoenix, Zeno Robinson as Remy, Anna Akana as Gloria, Raven-Symoné as Maria Media, Christopher Lloyd as Santa Claus
35	5	"Reckoning Ball"	Natasha Kline	Anna O'Brian & Ariel Vracin-Harrell	Kenny Byerly	December 14, 2019	205	0.61
35	5	"Clubbed"	Monica Ray	Kiana Khansmith & Caldwell Tanner	Lacey Dyer & Julia Layton	December 14, 2019	205	0.61
"Reckoning Ball": While attempting to destroy the Greens' house as revenge, Chip Whistler gets thwarted by the Greens and Officer Keys. He is then reprimanded by his father for his causing public relations nightmares for the Wholesome Foods Company and threatens to remove him from the Wholesome Foods Company if he does not apologize to the Greens for his behavior. The Greens decide to have him help out with chores around the house, much to his irritation. Little do they know, he secretly plots to deceive them. "Clubbed": Gloria steps out to the new club that has opened in Big City. Tilly and Andromeda assume that she has invited them along, but when they arrive they believe that she has amnesia and try to "cure" her. Meanwhile, Bill and Cricket decide to watch a classic sci-fi film for the night, but Bill cannot stop spoiling plot points. Guest stars: Paul Scheer as Chip Whistler, Shane Houghton as Greg, Andy Daly as Officer Keys, Ed Begley Jr. as Mr. Whistler, C. H. Greenblatt as Dentist, Anna Akana as Gloria, Nicole Byer as Andromeda, Fred Tatasciore as Dark Star
36	6	"Impopstar"	Natasha Kline	Amy Hudkins & Jonathan Wallach	Lacey Dyer & Julia Layton	January 11, 2020	206	0.58
36	6	"Football Camp"	Monica Ray	Written by : Carson Montgomery, Raj Brueggeman & Steve Wolfhard; Storyboarded by : Raj Brueggeman & Steve Wolfhard	Carson Montgomery	January 11, 2020	206	0.58
"Impopstar": Cricket discovers that he bears an uncanny resemblance to pop star Zillon Brax who recently disappeared so that he can enjoy normal life. Cricket and Nancy decide to take advantage of the perks of being famous. Meanwhile, the rest of the Greens take Zillon in believing him to be Cricket, but Tilly is suspicious... but not as suspicious as a number 1 fangirl who mistakes Cricket as Zillon. "Football Camp": Remy decides to join the Lil' Bengals Football Camp hosted by his father so that he can finally earn his respect. Cricket tags along for support. When Russell believes the two to be unfit for training, the two combine their talents to prove him wrong. Meanwhile, Tilly is convinced the mascot is a real animal. Guest stars: Wendi McLendon-Covey as Nancy Green, Zeno Robinson as Remy, Raven-Symoné as Maria Media, Dee Bradley Baker as Phoenix, Andy Daly as Officer Keys, Zach Reino as Zillon Brax, Jessica McKenna as Amaryllis, Colton Dunn as Russell Remington, Lorraine Toussaint as Rashida Remington, Danny Trejo as Vasquez
37	7	"Heat Beaters"	Monica Ray	Raj Brueggeman & Steve Wolfhard	Carson Montegomery	January 18, 2020	207	0.57
37	7	"Bill-iever"	Natasha Kline	Charlie Gavin & Anna O'Brian	Jenava Mie	January 18, 2020	207	0.57
"Heat Beaters": On the hottest day in Big City, Remy shows up to challenge Cricket to a game of H-O-R-S-E. Cricket does not have the stamina to complete the game, but notices that Remy is unusually jovial despite the heat. The rest of the Greens stay indoors to use their new air conditioner, but find themselves trapped in the ever freezing house. "Bill-iever": Cricket finds Gramma's old mobile scooter and joy rides it, resulting in the garden getting destroyed. Cricket quickly blames the situation on aliens which Tilly and Gramma buy into, but Bill is ever skeptical. However, Cricket proceeds to make an elaborate set up so that Bill can fall for his ruse, but it works too well. Guest stars: Wendi McLendon-Covey as Nancy Green, Zeno Robinson as Remy, Andy Daly as Officer Keys, Nicole Byer as Andromeda, Danny Trejo as Vasquez, Karl-Anthony Towns as Wizard Williams and Ricky Stork
38	8	"Shark Objects"	Monica Ray	Kiana Khansmith & Caldwell Tanner	Kenny Byerly	January 25, 2020	208	0.55
38	8	"Dream Weaver"	Natasha Kline	Amy Hudkins & Jonathan Wallach	Lacey Dyer & Julia Layton	January 25, 2020	208	0.55
"Shark Objects": The Green Family head out for a day at the beach where they get caught in crazy shenanigans. Cricket wants to prank the beach goers with a shark fin which puts him in serious trouble, while Nancy must struggle with being a responsible parent. Bill is helpless under Tilly's sand building project and Gramma and a seagull get arrested for fighting on the beach. "Dream Weaver": Cricket becomes bored after waking up in the middle of the night. He discovers that his family members all talk in their sleep and decides to take advantage of the situation by feeding them thoughts and ideas into their heads. However, this causes them to have nightmares and they cause havoc while sleepwalking, and Cricket must fix their bedtimes. Guest stars: Wendi McLendon-Covey as Nancy Green, Rhys Darby as Lifeguard, Luke Lowe as Benny, Dee Bradley Baker as Phoenix
39	9	"Level Up"	Monica Ray	Raj Brueggeman & Steve Wolfhard	Kenny Byerly	February 1, 2020	209	0.59
39	9	"Wild Side"	Natasha Kline	Amy Hudkins & Jonathan Wallach	Carson Montgomery	February 1, 2020	209	0.59
"Level Up": Disappointed with the lack of advancements in his farming, due to the constricting nature of Big City, Bill is introduced to a farming simulator by Remy and quickly becomes addicted to it. When he refuses to remove himself from the game, Cricket, Remy, Tilly and Gramma must get their game on and play the farming simulator to rescue Bill. "Wild Side": Cricket is suffering from "the itch" when he refuses to settle and becomes a feral child on one certain day a year. The only solution is to take Cricket camping. However, Bill neuters the experience causing Cricket to run amok in Big City and forcing Bill, Remy and Gramma to chase him only to eventually get manipulated into becoming wild like him. Meanwhile, Tilly and Nancy have an unusual camping experience of their own. Guest stars: Wendi McLendon-Covey as Nancy Green, Dee Bradley Baker as Melissa, Zeno Robinson as Remy, John Early as Alexander
40	10	"Garage Tales"	Monica Ray	Kiana Khansmith & Caldwell Tanner	Jenava Mie	February 8, 2020	210	0.44
40	10	"Animal Farm"	Natasha Kline	Natasha Kline & Anna O'Brian	Kenny Byerly & Shane Houghton	February 8, 2020	210	0.44
"Garage Tales": While sifting through some junk in the garage, Cricket and Tilly discover a box of old stuff that Gramma insists is important to her and tells them about the biggest adventure in her life. Bill becomes annoyed with the obviously exaggerated story, until Gramma reveals that it is about how she met the most important person to her. "Animal Farm": As the Greens head out to market, Phoenix is left in charge of taking care of the farm. However, Cogburn the Rooster wants to become ruler and tries to convince the animals to raid the Greens' home. Meanwhile, Bill meets another Bill Green who is a younger, fit and more successful version of himself. Guest stars: Tim Blake Nelson as Grampa Green, Jameela Jamil as Phoenix, Alfred Molina as Cogburn, Jim O'Heir as Other Bill Green, Carl Tart as Dirtbag
41	11	"Desserted"	Natasha Kline	Amy Hudkins & Jonathan Wallach	Carson Montgomery	July 11, 2020	211	0.45
41	11	"The Gifted"	Monica Ray	Raj Brueggeman & Steve Wolfhard	Jenava Mie	July 11, 2020	211	0.45
"Desserted": When Cricket takes the family out for a meal, Bill becomes suspicious on how he is going to pay for it. It turns out that his plan is to complete "The Crispy's Sundae Challenge" wherein if they eat 50 pounds of ice cream in one hour, their meal is free. Unfortunately, the family gets full before they can finish it, leaving Cricket to eat it all. "The Gifted": On Father's Day, Tilly is surprised when Cricket's gift for Bill gets a similar enthusiastic response as hers did. They begin to suspect that Bill does not actually like their gifts and is simply being nice and decide to test his limits to what he can accept. Meanwhile, Gramma sets out to get a good Father's Day card for Bill. Guest stars: Wendi McLendon-Covey as Nancy Green, Riki Lindhome as Gina
42	12	"Time Crisis"	Natasha Kline	Jennifer Begeman & Ariel Vracin-Harrell	Carson Montgomery	July 18, 2020	212	0.26
42	12	"Gramma Driver"	Monica Ray	Kiana Khansmith & Caldwell Tanner	Kenny Byerly	July 18, 2020	212	0.26
"Time Crisis": Remy is preparing for a violin recital that according to him will determine his future. However, he goes into full panic mode when he realizes that he has not fully memorized his entire music piece. Cricket tries to ease his mind with his own idea of the future, but when it begins to look just as grim as Remy's the two, plus Vasquez, try to figure out what to do. "Gramma Driver": After getting new phones, Gramma learns that her car has been repaired and tries to prove to Bill that she is a competent driver only to pick up a pair of dangerous criminals named Bash and Bella and made their getaway driver. Meanwhile, Cricket's prank call to Gloria backfires horribly and Tilly is convinced that the phone's A.I. needs to be freed. Guest stars: Zeno Robinson as Remy, Danny Trejo as Vasquez, SungWon Cho as King Violin, Anna Akana as Gloria, Andy Daly as Officer Keys, Thomas Middleditch as Bash, Lauren Lapkus as Bella, Raven-Symoné as Maria Media
43	13	"Tilly Style"	Monica Ray	Raj Brueggemann & Steve Wolfhard	Carson Montgomery	July 25, 2020	213	0.40
43	13	"I, Farmbot"	Natasha Kline	Amy Hudkins & Jonathan Wallach	Rachel McNevin	July 25, 2020	213	0.40
"Tilly Style": When Tilly is confused for a baby, Nancy takes her to the mall to try and find a new "mature" look for her, but with every passing person of dominance, Tilly continues to try and find that perfect mature look for herself. Meanwhile, Bill tries to get Cricket to eat the overstock of zucchini he had grown, resulting in him rebelling in a battle of wits. "I, Farmbot": Cricket convinces Bill into buying a robot farmer from Big Tech called F.R.A.N.K. so that they no longer have to do any chores. As it works perfectly, Bill realizes that he has nothing else to do and Cricket gets him to relax. Unfortunately, Bill becomes a couch potato and F.R.A.N.K. tries to take over the Green Family farm. Guest stars: Wendi McLendon-Covey as Nancy Green, Cheri Oteri as Gwendolyn Zapp, Jeff Bennett as F.R.A.N.K.
44	14	"Friend Con"	Monica Ray	Caldwell Tanner & Kiana Khansmith	Kenny Byerly	August 1, 2020	214	0.56
44	14	"Flimflammed"	Natasha Kline	Written by : Kenny Byerly, Carson Montgomery & Rachel McNevin; Storyboarded by : Ariel Vracin-Harrell & Eddie West	Jenava Mie	August 1, 2020	214	0.56
"Friend Con": Bill takes the family to Farm Con where he is a keynote speaker. When he laments that he cannot hang out with his friend Good Ol' Joe, Tilly and Cricket resolve to set him up with the next best thing: Chip Whistler. However, Chip still wants revenge on the Greens and hopes to ruin Bill and it is up to Cricket and Tilly to save the day. Meanwhile, Gramma tries to carry as much freebies as she can. "Flimflammed": After being rewarded $100 for returning a dog to his owner, Cricket ends up getting "flimflammed" by a man named John into investing into a series of faulty products called the Skull Slimmer. Cricket tries to get his money back by scamming Gloria, but becomes guilty when Tilly and Gramma talk some sense into him about how wrong scamming is. Guest stars: Paul Scheer as Chip Whistler, Cheri Oteri as Gwendolyn Zapp, Darin De Paul as Good Ol' Joe, Joey Diaz as John, Zeno Robinson as Remy, Betsy Sodaro as Community Sue, Luke Lowe as Benny, Anna Akana as Gloria
45	15	"Greens' Acres"	Natasha Kline	Amy Hudkins & Jonathan Wallach	Kenny Byerly	August 8, 2020	215	0.39
45	15	"Dolled Up"	Natasha Kline	Ariel Vracin-Harrell & Chris Pianka	Rachel McNevin	August 8, 2020	215	0.39
"Greens' Acres": 30 years ago, young Bill Green tries to prevent his mother Alice from selling the farm. When she bans him from doing anymore farm work, Bill decides to go looking for jobs. He meets Nancy whose father assigns the two to go to the arcade in the fast developing Big City and sell cheap game tokens. In their haste, the two get into trouble with the law. "Dolled Up": The Greens head to the Lil Ladies doll store for Saxon's birthday. Tilly and Nancy eat at the café, but the former is enthralled with the famous Cantaloupe Sinclair and her circle of doll obsessed cronies, only to discover she is not the nice person she hoped of. Meanwhile, Gramma takes an unwilling Cricket on a tour who stows away and gets mistaken for a doll, and trouble ensues while Bill tries to build the perfect dollhouse. Guest stars: Wendi McLendon-Covey as Nancy Green, Andre Robinson as Young Bill, Candace Kozak as Young Nancy, Billy West as Nick, Jason Maybaum as Young Keys, Jessica McKenna as Willow, Adam McArthur as Ashton, Melissa Fumero as Cantaloupe Sinclair
46	16	"Gabriella's Fella"	Monica Ray	Raj Brueggeman & Steve Wolfhard	Carson Montgomery	August 15, 2020	216	0.37
46	16	"Cheap Show"	Monica Ray	Caldwell Tanner & Kiana Khansmith	Kenny Byerly	August 15, 2020	216	0.37
"Gabriella's Fella": Cricket is still smitten with Gabriella since the events of "Valentine's Dance", but is too nervous to talk to her. Wanting to make up for all the times he has helped him, Remy decides to help Cricket say the right things to Gabriella and eventually learns she is a prankster just like him; in the end he confesses his feelings, and they become a couple. Meanwhile, Community Sue leaves Tilly in charge of the equipment and the power ends up going to her head. "Cheap Show": In this meta-narrative episode, Bill prevents the rest of the Greens from going to the fair that is in town and suggests that they sit at home and try other things to save money. This drives the family crazy as they proceed to recall events only for Bill to reveal that he has cut back on their "production budget", resulting in more shenanigans. Guest stars: Wendi McLendon-Covey as Nancy Green, Danny Trejo as Vasquez, Zeno Robinson as Remy, Betsy Sodaro as Community Sue, Lamar Woods as Weezie, Jenna Ortega as Gabriella Espinosa, Tom Hanks as himself
47	17	"Green Mirror"	Natasha Kline	Amy Hudkins & Jonathan Wallach	Kenny Byerly	August 22, 2020	217	0.48
47	17	"Cricket's Tickets"	Monica Ray	Raj Brueggeman	Rachel McNevin	August 22, 2020	217	0.48
"Green Mirror": While dropping off produce at Big Tech, Tilly comes to the realization that her family has a habit of being disruptive everywhere that they go. Gwendolyn Zapp offers them the opportunity to delete their flaws in her new "perfect family" program. The Greens are excited about the idea, but Tilly soon learns that having flaws is what makes them special. "Cricket's Tickets": Cricket unexpectedly wins tickets to the Barnacle Banquet Pirate Show, exciting Tilly and Remy. Unfortunately, Cricket only has two tickets and has to pick one of them to go. Instead, Cricket takes advantage of the situation by extorting favors from all the kids in Big City, greatly disappointing Remy and Tilly who plan a scheme to get back at him. Guest stars: Cheri Oteri as Gwendolyn Zapp, Zeno Robinson as Remy, Danny Trejo as Vasquez, Andy Daly as Officer Keys, Luke Lowe as Benny, Monica Ray as Kiki, Scott Aukerman as Radio DJ, Lucy Lawless as Mimi O'Malley, Tim Robinson as Gregly
48	18	"Times Circle"	Monica Ray	Kiana Khansmith & Caldwell Tanner	Rachel McNevin	August 29, 2020	218	0.31
48	18	"Super Gramma!"	Natasha Kline	Ariel Vracin-Harrell & Chris Pianka	Lacey Dyer & Julia Layton	August 29, 2020	218	0.31
"Times Circle": The Greens and Remy visit Times Circle for some fun. Tilly and Remy try to put on a show for some bored passersby, but get lost in trying to learn what they want to see, Cricket and Bill encounter street performers dressed as their favorite superheroes and get into a fight with their rivals while Gramma encounters an obnoxious television show host. "Super Gramma!": Gramma comes back from her cataract surgery and Bill insists she stay home while he get her her Tuesday things. She sneaks out and Cricket and Tilly are forced to follow her throughout her day and discover that she has a hidden club that she frequents. Meanwhile, Bill is given a false address for Gramma's food and ends up at a hipster restaurant. Guest stars: Zeno Robinson as Remy, Fred Tatasciore as Bulk/Greasy Gus, Sandy Martin as Gertie, Roger Craig Smith as America Rat, Keith Ferguson as Tuck
49	19	"Present Tense"	Natasha Kline	Amy Hudkins & Jonathan Wallach	Marieve Herington & Jeffrey Jones	September 12, 2020	219	0.38
49	19	"Hurt Bike"	Natasha Kline	Ariel Vracin-Harrell & Tyler Chen	Carson Montgomery	September 12, 2020	219	0.38
"Present Tense": Cricket is invited to Remy's birthday party, but becomes demoralized when the gift he brings is small compared to all of the other presents and decides to collect tickets to get a legendary stuffed animal, but ends up ditching all the fun Remy planned with him in the process. When Cricket successfully redeems the prize Remy wanted, he accidentally ruins Remy's cake and Remy cries over Cricket ditching him and reveals all he wanted was to spend time with him, so Cricket decides to make up for ditching Remy by doing all the things he wanted them to do. Meanwhile, Bill and Tilly argue over the rules of the game whack-a-mole and Gramma goes searching for a lost child in a series of play tubes. "Hurt Bike": Nancy builds a dirt bike for Cricket and Tilly to ride. When Cricket takes it for a spin, he nearly crashes, but evades it in time. Traumatized by his experience, Cricket looks to Bill on how to be safe, but goes overboard. When Nancy fixes the bike for Tilly to ride, Cricket must overcome his fears lest he hurt himself and Nancy. Guest stars: Wendi McLendon-Covey as Nancy Green, Zeno Robinson as Remy, Danny Trejo as Vasquez, Colton Dunn as Russell Remington, Lorraine Toussaint as Rashida Remington, Monica Ray as Kiki, Luke Lowe as Benny
50	20	"Quiet Please"	Monica Ray	Kiana Khansmith & Caldwell Tanner	Kenny Byerly	September 19, 2020	220	0.53
50	20	"Chipwrecked"	Monica Ray	Raj Brueggeman & Steve Wolfhard	Kenny Byerly & Carson Montgomery	September 19, 2020	220	0.53
"Quiet Please": To encourage Cricket to spend more time reading, the family takes him to the library. Despite his best efforts, Cricket struggles to find a book that appeals to him due to his short attention span. During their visit, the family is forced to constantly evade the librarian, a terrifying figure who punishes even the smallest noise, so the Greens communicate with sign language to avoid getting caught. Note: This episode is a parody of the 2018 film A Quiet Place. "Chipwrecked": Chip Whistler becomes disheartened after another failed attempt at trying destroy the Greens, who no longer take him seriously. Meanwhile, Cricket tries to get his family to work for him, but they soon catch on. Feeling that he is considered a joke, Chip takes advice from his oblivious father to "put the company to work for [him]" differently, and decides to use his company to overcome the Greens, seizing control of and closing Big Coffee and firing Cricket and Gloria, and the Greens are left worried over what will happen next. Guest stars: Anna Akana as Gloria/Ms. Cho, Andy Daly as Officer Keys, Shane Houghton as Greg, Mary Holland as Chairwoman, Linda Hamilton as Librarian, Paul Scheer as Chip Whistler, Ed Begley Jr. as Mr. Whistler
51	21	"Chipocalypse Now"	Jonathon Wallach	Caldwell Tanner, Kiana Khansmith, Faryn Pearl & Ariel Vracin-Harrell	Kenny Byerly	January 16, 2021	221	0.52
Following on from the events of "Chipwrecked", having succeeded in cornering the Greens, Chip Whistler's next step is to tear down the Green family farm and replace it with a parking lot. Bill feels that it is a lost cause, but the rest of the family, especially Cricket, is not giving up. Chip has Mayor Hansock convinced that Big City wants to remove the Greens due to a petition. However, with the help of Remy, Cricket discovers that the petition was forged and race to reveal the truth. Meanwhile, the Greens defend their house from a construction crew that is hellbent on destroying them, while Tilly has to convince Bill to not give up on himself and family is worth fighting for. Guest stars: Wendi McLendon-Covey as Nancy Green, Zeno Robinson as Remy, Andy Daly as Officer Keys, Anna Akana as Gloria Sato, Paul Scheer as Chip Whistler, Raven-Symoné as Maria Media, Danny Trejo as Vasquez, Andy Richter as Mayor Hansock
52	22	"'Rent Control"	Anna O'Brian	Raj Brueggeman, Anna O'Brian & Monica Ray	Kenny Byerly	January 23, 2021	222	0.28
52	22	"Pool's Gold"	Anna O'Brian	Amy Hudkins & Steve Wolfhard	Rachel McNevin	January 23, 2021	222	0.28
"'Rent Control": Now jobless and homeless after what happened in the last episode, Gloria lives with the Greens much to her displeasure. When she learns that her parents are coming to visit, Gloria panics. Luckily, Cricket and Tilly offer their services to fake her wealth and living conditions. While the plan works, Gloria comes to realize that her parents may have had put too much pressure on her. "Pool's Gold": As the Greens enjoy their stay at the pool, Cricket gets word that there is a much better pool somewhere in Big City, resulting in him, Tilly, Nancy and Gramma Alice going on a wild adventure to find it. Meanwhile, Bill stays behind and rescues a child from drowning, causing everyone at the pool to praise him a hero. Guest stars: Wendi McLendon-Covey as Nancy Green, Anna Akana as Gloria, Zeno Robinson as Remy, Kimberly Mooney as Single Mom and Old Aerobics Lady, Colton Dunn as Brett, Keone Young as Mr. Sato, Amy Hill as Mrs. Sato, Tim Robinson as Gregly, Colin Hanks as Mark
53	23	"Big Resolution"	Anna O'Brian	Raj Brueggemann & Kristen Gish	Rachel McNevin	January 30, 2021	223	0.43
53	23	"Winter Greens"	Anna O'Brian	Amy Hudkins & Steve Wolfhard	Carson Montgomery	January 30, 2021	223	0.43
"Big Resolution": As the Greens prepare for their New Year's resolutions, Cricket discovers that Gloria's resolution is to ask out her longtime crush Kevin. Being a love expert, as he himself has a girlfriend, Cricket and Tilly decide to help her out. Meanwhile, Nancy and Gramma Alice try to help with Bill's resolution by getting him out of his comfort zone. "Winter Greens": On a particularly snowy day, Cricket and Remy get the bright idea to have a snowball fight with Vasquez. In order for this to happen, Remy temporarily fires him and he hits back hard with a snowball war. Elsewhere, Tilly builds a snowperson named Margaret and she and Nancy fill out its bucket list before she melts, but Nancy gets too attached. Guest star: Wendi McLendon-Covey as Nancy Green, Anna Akana as Gloria, Zeno Robinson as Remy, Luke Lowe as Benny, Danny Trejo as Vasquez, Raven-Symoné as Maria Media, David Wain as Ronald Featherman, Booboo Stewart as Kevin
54	24	"Mages & Mazes"	Jonathon Wallach	Caldwell Tanner & Kiana Khansmith	Amy Hudkins	February 6, 2021	224	0.38
54	24	"Okay Karaoke"	Jonathon Wallach	Faryn Pearl & Ariel Vracin-Harrell	Rachel McNevin	February 6, 2021	224	0.38
"Mages & Mazes": Remy invites Cricket, Tilly and Kiki over to his house to play Mages & Mazes, a pastiche of Dungeons & Dragons. Having developed a complex and intuitive adventure for his friends, things seem to start off well. However, everyone quickly grows tired of the complicated rules and difficulty level that Remy has set up and try to alter the game. "Okay Karaoke": The Greens and Remy head out to a karaoke bar to sing some tunes. Everyone has their own idea of what to sing: Bill with country rock, Nancy with punk rock, Gramma Alice with classic swing and Cricket and Remy with hip-hop techno. However, Tilly is having difficulty trying to find a "perfect" song for herself that it ends up driving her mad. Guest star: Wendi McLendon-Covey as Nancy Green, Zeno Robinson as Remy, Monica Ray as Kiki, Danny Trejo as Vasquez, Aaron Barrett as Ska Guy, Macy Gray as Kara Karaoke
55	25	"Date Night"	Anna O'Brian	Raj Brueggemann & Kristen Gish	Carson Montgomery	February 13, 2021	225	0.35
55	25	"The Room"	Anna O'Brian	Amy Hudkins & Steve Wolfhard	Kenny Byerly	February 13, 2021	225	0.35
"Date Night": Cricket and Gabriella plan to go out on a date to see the new America Rat movie. They get Bill to be their chaperone and, completely new to their relationship, feels it is his duty to take matters into his own hands and make their date "perfect". However, his idea for a date ends up causing more harm than good for Cricket and Gabriella. "The Room": When Tilly closes up Cricket's secret entrance, it causes a rift between them that snowballs into a full blown fight over splitting their bedroom up. The cable goes out and while Bill goes to fix it, Gloria and Gramma Alice become invested in Cricket and Tilly's conflict to the point that they begin to egg on their radical decisions. Guest star: Anna Akana as Gloria, Jenna Ortega as Gabriella, Joh Early as Alexander
56	26	"Bleeped"	Jonathon Wallach	Caldwell Tanner & Kiana Khansmith	Carson Montgomery	March 6, 2021	226	0.41
56	26	"Sellouts"	Anna O'Brian	Amy Hudkins & Steve Wolfhard	Kenny Byerly	March 6, 2021	226	0.41
"Bleeped": Cricket overhears Gramma Alice utter the word "Blort". Upon learning that it is a cuss word, Cricket does everything he can to repeat it, much to the irritation of everyone. Bill takes it upon himself to set him straight before a major event. Meanwhile, Tilly tries to perfect her singing so that animals can hear her high note. "Sellouts": Bill informs the family that they are almost broke and must sell their produce fast. They head out to the Farmer's Market where each of the Greens try different tactics to sell their goods. Gloria is left behind due to her unfamiliarity and while trying to feed the chickens ends up releasing them into the city. Guest star: Wendi McLendon-Covey as Nancy Green, Zeno Robinson as Remy, Anna Akana as Gloria, Andy Daly as Officer Keys, Monica Ray as Kiki, Betsy Sodaro as Community Sue, Lamar Woods as Weezie, Luke Lowe as Benny, Danny Trejo as Vasquez
57	27	"Fast Foodie"	Jonathon Wallach	Ariel Vracin-Harrell & Faryn Pearl	Zeno Robinson	March 13, 2021	227	0.40
57	27	"Spaghetti Theory"	Jonathon Wallach	Ariel Vracin-Harrell & Faryn Pearl	Rachel McNevin	March 13, 2021	227	0.40
"Fast Foodie": A new Burger Clown restaurant opens up next door to the Greens, exciting Cricket. When Bill tells him that he will get bored eating there for a week, Cricket and Tilly take it as a challenge and tries to eat there every day. This results in him getting morbidly obese and Tilly getting sick. Despite this, Cricket will not stop eating the burgers. "Spaghetti Theory": Tilly postulates that everyone in Big City is connected. One action leads to another as she and Cricket deliver vegetables to their friends. Brett, Mr. Grigorian, Maria Media, Mayor Hansock, Vasquez, Officer Keys, Bash and Bella, Alexander, Terry, and Gloria all take center stage in this episode, culminating in one big conclusion. Guest star: Zeno Robinson as Remy, Anna Akana as Gloria, Andy Daly as Officer Keys, Raven-Symoné as Maria Media, John Early as Alexander, Colton Dunn as Brett, Monica Ray as Kiki, Luke Lowe as Benny, Betsy Sodaro as Community Sue, Maurice LaMarche as Mr. Grigorian, Tim Robinson as Gregly, Danny Trejo as Vasquez, Thomas Middleditch as Bash, Lauren Lapkus as Bella, Andy Richter as Mayor Hansock, Dan Fogler as Burger Clown CEO, Joe Manganiello as Viper Fang
58	28	"Ding Dongers"	Kiana Khansmith	Amy Hudkins & Steve Wolfhard	Rachel McNevin	March 20, 2021	228	0.40
58	28	"Animation Abomination"	Anna O'Brian	Raj Brueggemann & Kristen Gish	Kenny Byerly	March 20, 2021	228	0.40
"Ding Dongers": Remy is addicted to a new app called Ding Dong where people post short videos of themselves doing crazy things. Remy discovers that his videos become massively popular when Cricket does things that harm himself and he pushes him to his limit. Meanwhile, Gloria gives Tilly her phone and she tries to make Phoenix famous to no avail. "Animation Abomination": Cricket and Tilly discover that Gloria is working as an intern at an animation studio and force themselves to come over to see them make their favorite show Kingdom of Lore. While Tilly suggests the perfect ending, Cricket suggests a lousy one that the animators choose, forcing Tilly to stop the production. Guest star: Zeno Robinson as Remy, Anna Akana as Gloria, Monica Ray as Kiki, Lamar Woods as Weezie, Luke Lowe as Benny, Shane Houghton as Blaine, Caldwell Tanner as Itchaboi, Chris Diamantopoulos as Ed Zecutive, Chris Houghton as Topher
59	29	"The Van"	Jonathon Wallach	Caldwell Tanner & Kiana Khansmith	Carson Montgomery	March 27, 2021	229	0.51
59	29	"Bat Girl"	Anna O'Brian	Caldwell Tanner & Kiana Khansmith	Carson Montgomery	March 27, 2021	229	0.51
"The Van": Gramma and Cricket team up to get rid of a van that was parked in front of their house. After doing so, the owner Rick turns out to be a really nice man who they try to help so that he will not call the cops. Meanwhile, Tilly heads to Little Tokyo to buy bread and feed her koi fish Marcus who has grown to mammoth proportions. "Bat Girl": Community Sue leads her little league team, the Sue-Zers, against her rival team the Elite led by the highly competitive Community Dan. They end up being no match for them so Nancy steps in to help the Sue-Zers win, but accidentally imbues the same cockiness they were fighting against to begin with. Guest star: Wendi McLendon-Covey as Nancy Green, Zeno Robinson as Remy, Anna Akana as Gloria, Andy Daly as Officer Keys, Monica Ray as Kiki, Luke Lowe as Benny, Betsy Sodaro as Community Sue, Lamar Woods as Weezie, Jenna Ortega as Gabriella, Tim Robinson as Gregly, Nicole Byer as Andromeda, Colton Dunn as Russell Remington, Lorraine Toussaint as Rashida Remington, Rob Riggle as Community Dan, David Harbour as Rick
60	30	"Cousin Jilly"	Anna O'Brian	Raj Brueggemann & Kristen Gish	Rachel McNevin & Carson Montgomery	April 3, 2021	230	0.31
60	30	"Gloria's Café"	Jonathon Wallach	Ariel Vracin-Harrell & Faryn Pearl	Kenny Byerly	April 3, 2021	230	0.31
"Cousin Jilly": Cricket reminisces on his cool cousin Jilly, unaware of the fact that it was a character that Tilly made to beat his boredom. She decides to revive the character to keep the charade, but cannot be in two places at once. Meanwhile, Nancy takes advantage of Gramma's hospitality when she calls her a guest rather than a family member. "Gloria's Café": Gloria fails to get a loan to jumpstart her Parisian café business as Gramma claims that she doesn't have the grit for it, but quickly learns that the empty Big Coffee building next door was not locked properly. With Cricket and Tilly's help, she runs an illegal café. However, Bill, Nancy and Gramma become suspicious to its secrecy while Officer Keys begins to snoop. When the truth comes out, Officer Keys sheds his disguise and arrests Gloria. As Bill comments about the many times they had to park outside the Big City Police Department, Officer Keys releases Gloria and uses the proceeds she gained to cover her fines for trespassing before her release. They head home where Gramma is waiting for them. Having been impressed with Gloria, Gramma uses some of her money from her retirement fund to purchase the building. It gets the name of Gloria + Green Café as one passerby thinks that Gloria's last name is Green. Guest star: Wendi McLendon-Covey as Nancy Green, Anna Akana as Gloria, Andy Daly as Officer Keys, John Early as Alexander
