= Big City Greens =

American animated television series

- Genre: Animated sitcom
- Created by: Chris Houghton; Shane Houghton
- Voices of: Chris Houghton; Marieve Herington; Bob Joles; Artemis Pebdani; Zeno Robinson; Wendi McLendon-Covey; Anna Akana
- Theme music composer: The Mowgli's
- Opening theme: "Big City Greens Main Title Theme" by The Mowgli's
- Ending theme: "Do It All Again" by Shane Houghton and Chris Houghton
- Composer: Joachim Horsley
- Country of origin: United States
- Original language: English
- No. of seasons: 5
- No. of episodes: 118 (list of episodes)

Production
- Executive producers: Rob Renzetti; Chris Houghton; Shane Houghton; Anna O'Brian; Stephen Sandoval (Note: Co-executive producer)
- Producers: Jason Wyatt; Mike Coughlin
- Editors: Nancy Frazen; Kevin Locarro
- Running time: 22 minutes
- Production company: Disney Television Animation (Note: Animation outsourced to Rough Draft Korea and Sugarcube.)

Original release
- Network: Disney Channel
- Release: June 18, 2018 – present

Related
- Big City Greens the Movie: Spacecation

Big City Greens is an American animated sitcom created by Chris and Shane Houghton that premiered on Disney Channel on June 18, 2018. The series follows the Green family—siblings Cricket and Tilly, their father Bill, and their Gramma Alice—as they navigate life in the bustling, fictional Big City after moving from their countryside home. Among the supporting characters are Cricket's best friend Remy, the children's mother and Bill's ex-wife Nancy, and their family friend Gloria.

The series features the voices of Chris Houghton, Marieve Herington, Bob Joles, Artemis Pebdani, Zeno Robinson, Wendi McLendon-Covey, and Anna Akana. In March 2016, Disney XD picked it up for production under the title of Country Club; it had later been renamed to Big City Greens by July 2017. The series is produced by Disney Television Animation, with executive producers including creators Chris and Shane Houghton, alongside Rob Renzetti, Stephen Sandoval, and Anna O'Brian.

The series has received positive reviews from critics for its comedy, characters, and central family dynamic. The show is Disney Channel's longest-running consecutive animated series of all time, and the second overall (right behind Phineas and Ferb). The fourth season concluded in August 2025, and a fifth season was ordered a year and two months before, in June 2024. The fifth season premiered on August 21, 2026.

A film titled Big City Greens the Movie: Spacecation premiered in June 2024. A spin-off series is in development.

== Premise ==
After losing his farm in the country town of Smalton, Bill Green and his two children, Cricket and Tilly, move in with his mother, Alice Green (Gramma), who lives on a small farm holdout in the middle of a bustling, fictional city known as "Big City". They have different misadventures there and occasionally contend with a crooked supermarket manager named Chip Whistler. Major recurring characters include Cricket's friend Remy Remington and café worker Gloria Sato.

By the second half of season three, Bill moves his family back to Smalton after regaining his farm. Starting in season four, Cricket, Tilly, and Bill balance between going back and forth from Big City to Smalton, where Nancy, Bill's ex-wife and the mother of Cricket and Tilly, manages the farm.

== Episodes ==
Season	Segments	Episodes	Originally released	
Season	Segments	Episodes	First released	Last released
1	58	30	June 18, 2018	March 9, 2019
2	58	30	November 16, 2019	April 3, 2021
3	36	20	October 9, 2021	March 25, 2023
4	58	30	September 23, 2023	August 9, 2025
Film			June 6, 2024	
5	TBA	30	August 21, 2026	TBA

== Characters ==
=== Main ===
- Cricket Green (voiced by Chris Houghton) is a 10-year-old troublemaking and mischievous country boy who is always barefoot. His middle name comes from his late paternal grandfather. He is fascinated by every discovery he makes in Big City, but never knows what he might uncover. His naive, reckless, impulsive, troublesome, and hyperactive nature often lead him to cause conflicts for his family and throughout the city, but he is fundamentally a good-natured person; his actions are often as entirely self-serving as they are a misguided attempt to help his friends, family and others with their problems, and if those around him are blunt enough about his unpleasant moments, he will more than likely learn from them and not make the same mistake twice. He gets a job at Big Coffee in "Critterball Crisis" until it closed in "Chipwrecked". Later, he worked as a delivery boy at the Gloria + Green Café in the early episodes of Season 3, until his family moved back to Smalton in "The Move". In "Gloria Green", he works at the café for free.
- Tilly Green (voiced by Marieve Herington) is Cricket's older sister, with an eccentric and imaginative nature. She is frequently accompanied by Saxon, a homemade doll Tilly created out of an old sack. She is normally very cheerful, incredibly kind, and a pacifist by nature, though she has moments of selfishness, like her younger brother; this was shown in the episode "Mama Bird" when she was angry and jealous because the birds didn't show any affection towards her and instead favored Cricket. With that said, she is usually pleasant to be around.
- Billiam Robert "Bill" Green (voiced by Bob Joles as an adult, Andre Robinson as a child) is Cricket and Tilly's father and Gramma Alice's son. A skilled farmer, Bill is overprotective, cautious, and slightly forgetful, having lost part of a finger because of a hay baler accident, but competent all the same. It is later revealed that his full name is Billiam Robert Green.
- Alice Delores Green, often referred to as Gramma Alice (voiced by Artemis Pebdani), is Bill's cantankerous and combative mother and Cricket and Tilly's paternal grandmother, who owns the Green family farm in Big City. She frequently exhibits this behavior to hide her love and affection for her family.
- Remy Remington (voiced by Zeno Robinson) is Cricket's best friend, whom he meets shortly after moving to Big City. He comes from a rich family – being optimistic and fun-loving, but he also struggles with his self-confidence. He later tags along with the Greens in their move back to Smalton.
- Nancy Green (née Mulligan; voiced by Wendi McLendon-Covey as an adult, Candace Kozak as a child) is Cricket and Tilly's mother and Bill's ex-wife. A former biker with a rebellious streak, she was briefly incarcerated for trying to free cows from a factory before being released after the family moved to Big City. While they are divorced, she and Bill remain good friends and she is a frequent presence in the children's lives. Nancy even moves with the family when they buy their farm in Smalton back and continues to run the farm when they return to Big City even when her father moves in.
- Gloria Sato (voiced by Anna Akana) is the former barista at Big Coffee, who becomes friends and co-workers with Cricket. She dreams of one day saving up enough money to leave Big City and move to Paris. After "Chipocalypse Now", Gloria, who lost her Big Coffee job, gets evicted from her apartment and moves in with the Greens. In the Season 2 finale, "Gloria's Cafe" she and the Greens open the Gloria + Green Café. In season five, Gloria moves into the apartment complex that's next door to the greens.
- Chip Whistler (voiced by Paul Scheer) is the main antagonist of the series, the Green family's rival, and manager of the Wholesome Foods supermarket, a parody of Whole Foods Market. A running gag is that his attempts to defeat the Greens usually end with his front tooth chipped and a whistling noise coming out through it whenever he speaks (except for "Friend Con" in which all his other teeth fell out instead, and "Evil Family" where it does not happen), ironically making his name a descriptor. His front tooth would always be repaired by his next appearance. While having been launched out of Big City in his helicopter in season two with Mayor Hansock banishing him, he was thought to be dead until season four where he was revealed to have used the alias of "Norm Alguy". After that brief tenure, he began his plans to have his revenge on the Greens and Big City. He and allies enacted his plans to frame the Greens for ruining Big City. After Chip was defeated by Cricket with his teeth coming out, he and his allies were arrested by Officer Keys and the rest of the Big City Police Department. He was given a triple life sentence in prison.

=== Recurring ===
- Phoenix (vocal effects provided by Dee Bradley Baker, speaking voice provided by Jameela Jamil in "Animal Farm" and "Homeward Hound") is the Green family's pet dog. Her speaking voice is shown in the episodes featuring the farm animals.
- Melissa (vocal effects provided by Dee Bradley Baker, speaking voice provided by Marieve Herington in "Animal Farm" and "Homeward Hound") is a goat owned by the Green family. Her speaking voice is shown in the episodes featuring the farm animals.
- Officer Keys (voiced by Andy Daly as an adult, Jason Maybaum as a child) is a muscular Big City police officer with an overly cheery and oblivious personality. He can get serious at times when policing people.
- Kiki Kitashima (voiced by Monica Ray in 2018-2022, Stephanie Sheh in 2023-present), Westley "Weezie" Eastman (voiced by Lamar Woods), and Benny (voiced by Luke Lowe in Seasons 1-4 and the movie, Eli Witcher in Season 5) are a trio of children that frequently play with Cricket, Tilly, and Remy. Kiti is a Japanese-American tech-savvy girly girl who usually hangs with Tilly (although not as much as Andromeda; see below for more details), Weezie is a deep-voiced kid who tries to act cool, and Benny is a juvenile kid who speaks like Elmer Fudd and tends to get himself injured.
- Brett Eze (voiced by Colton Dunn) is the Greens' easygoing next-door neighbor living in apartment #310 at 5309 West Elkins Street who works at an animal shelter.
  - Wholesome Greg (voiced by Shane Houghton) is a worker at Wholesome Foods who is nicknamed "Wholesome Greg" by his boss Chip Whistler. In season four, Greg was reunited with an incognito Chip Whistler as he realigns with him in Chip's plot to get revenge on the Greens and Big City. During the final showdown, Wholesome Greg surrendered after seeing Cricket best Viper Fang, Spider Fang, and Wolf Fang.
  - Babe (voiced by June Diane Raphael) is a woman in Big City who Chip Whistler in his "Norm Alguy" alias fell in love with. When she found out his true identity, she surprised Chip by actually supporting him. After being defeated by Bill, Gramma Alice, and Tilly, she shared Chip's triple life sentence.
- Vasquez (voiced by Danny Trejo) is Remy's loyal but fiercely protective bodyguard who watches over him when Remy's parents are away. He used to be known as Tiger Fang when he was originally a member of the Order of the Fang where his defection to the Remington family contributed to the defeat of the Order of the Fang's unnamed master.
- Rashida Remington (voiced by Lorraine Toussaint) is Remy's well-to-do mother who works as a lawyer.
- Russell Remington (voiced by Colton Dunn) is Remy's father and Rashida's husband. He is a lawyer and former football player for the Big City Bengals.
- Ms. Miriam Cho (voiced by Anna Akana) is the former owner of Big Coffee and Gloria and Cricket's boss. She only communicates via grunting (though other characters seem to understand what she's saying) until "Chipwrecked" where Chip Whistler bribes Ms. Cho into retirement which results in Big Coffee closing. Upon leaving, she shouts "Peace out, my dudes!" Ms. Cho has not been seen since.
- Andromeda (voiced by Nicole Byer) is Tilly's best friend. She is a conspiracy theorist with a strong belief in aliens, supernatural phenomena, and government cover-ups. In her first appearance, she implies that Andromeda is not her real name.
- Alucard Grigorian (voiced by Maurice LaMarche) is an old Armenian man who is the neighbor of Brett and the Greens living in apartment #204 at 5309 West Elkins Street and has personal issues with Gramma. His first name was revealed in "Chipocalypse Now".
- Gabriella Espinosa (voiced by Jenna Ortega in 2019-2022, Nikki Castillo in 2023-present) is Cricket's friend and female counterpart. She's as troublemaking and rambunctious as Cricket is as well as sharing his interests. Prior to "Split Decision", she and Cricket were dating before Gabriella broke up with him to pursue new interests; however, she still remains on good terms with Cricket.
- Gregly (voiced by Tim Robinson) is Cricket's grumpy friend who has a habit of screaming everything he says.
- Maria Media (voiced by Raven-Symoné) is a local news reporter in Big City.
- Sue, often referred to as Community Sue (voiced by Betsy Sodaro as an adult, Monica Ray as a child), is the director of the Big City Community Center. She constantly shouts during conversations and regularly encourages others to adopt more health-conscious behaviors. Her last name is Lanemoto.
- Gwendolyn Zapp (voiced by Cheri Oteri) is the CEO of the BigTech technology company. She is an eccentric and slightly mad inventor, creating high-tech products that tend to go haywire.
- Good Ol' Joe (voiced by Darin De Paul) is Bill's best friend in Smalton who shares his interests.
- Mayor Hansock (voiced by Andy Richter) is the bumbling, dramatic, eccentric, and man-childish Mayor of Big City.
- Viper Fang (voiced by Joe Manganiello) is a viper-themed member of the Order of the Fang and an old enemy of Vasquez. He and two of his fellow Order of the Fang Members Spider Fang and Wolf Fang later attacked Remington Manor while Vasquez was away and allied with Chip Whistler when he withstood Vasquez's attacks. When it came to Chip Whistler's revenge on the Greens which involved framing them for ruining Big City, Viper Fang, Spider Fang, and Wolf Fang were defeated by Cricket and were arrested by the Big City Police Department.
- Doug Perkins (voiced by Tom Gammill) is a neighbor of the Greens, Brett, and Mr. Grigorian living at apartment #204 at 5309 West Elkins Street.
- Patti (voiced by Brooke Dillman) is the owner, manager, and chef of Patti's Diner in Smalton.
- Wayne (voiced by Tony Cavalero) is a waiter at Patti's Diner in Smalton.
- Hector (voiced by Harvey Guillén) is Cricket's old friend from the Smalton Scrapyard.
- Lupita (voiced by Rylee Alazraqui) is Hector's little boisterous sister.
- Sunday (voiced by Ali Stroker) is Hector's peace-loving girlfriend.
- Tracy Hicks (voiced by Kimberly Brooks) is a resident of Smallton.
- Trey Hicks (voiced by Armen Taylor) is a pot-bellied shirtless resident of Smallton and the husband of Tracy.
- Frank (voiced by Lance Barber) is an everyman resident of Smallton. He does various odd jobs like mail carrier, plumber, mechanic, nail technician, election official, doctor, lawyer, dentist, firefighter, data specialist, food health administrator, balloon artist, garbage man, babysitter, pizza maker, designer, race official, and sheriff.
- Nick (voiced by Billy West) is Nancy's estranged ne'er-do-well father and Cricket and Tilly's maternal grandfather. He previously appeared in flashbacks in the episodes "Greens' Acres" and "Rat Tail" before appearing in Season 4 to meet and spend time with his grandchildren and the rest of the family. His last name is revealed to be Mulligan.
- Jade (voiced by Liza Koshy) is a girl who becomes the shift manager at Gloria + Green Café.

=== Notable guest stars ===
- Judge Uppinsbottom (voiced by Kirby Howell-Baptiste) appears in "Tilly's Goat".
- Waiter (voiced by Jim Rash) appears in "Fill Bill".
- Fish (voiced by Busta Rhymes) appears in "Fill Bill".
- Pepper Merchant (voiced by Griffin McElroy) appears in "Feud Fight".
- Louis (voiced by Jon Hamm) appears in "Big Deal".
- Jyle (voiced by Wallace Shawn) appears in "Night Bill".
- Dr. Enamel (voiced by Eric Jacobson as Fozzie Bear) appears in "Hurty Tooth".
- Wyatt (voiced by Alex Hirsch) appears in "Park Pandemonium".
- Donny Tinselton (voiced by Thomas Middleditch) appears in "Cricket's Kapowie".
- Hair Stylist (voiced by Jonathan Van Ness) appears in "Cricket's Kapowie".
- Santa Claus (voiced by Christopher Lloyd) appears in "Green Christmas".
- Mr. Whistler (voiced by Ed Begley Jr.) appears in "Reckoning Ball" and "Chipwrecked".
- Grampa Ernest Green (voiced by Tim Blake Nelson) appears in "Garage Tales" and "One Hundred".
- Cogburn (voiced by Alfred Molina) appears in "Animal Farm" and "Homeward Hound".
- Other Bill Green (voiced by Jim O'Heir) appears in "Animal Farm".
- Gina (voiced by Riki Lindhome) appears in "Desserted".
- Canteloupe Sinclair (voiced by Melissa Fumero) appears in "Dolled Up".
- Tom Hanks (voiced by himself) speaks offscreen at the end of "Cheap Show".
- Mimi O'Malley (voiced by Lucy Lawless) appears in "Cricket's Tickets".
- Gertie (voiced by Sandy Martin) appears in "Super Gramma!".
- Librarian (voiced by Linda Hamilton) appears in "Quiet Please".
- Chairwoman (voiced by Mary Holland) appears in "Chipwrecked".
- Ronald Featherman (voiced by David Wain) appears in "Winter Greens".
- Kevin (voiced by Booboo Stewart) appears in "Winter Greens".
- Kara Karaoke (voiced by Macy Gray) appears in "Okay Karaoke".
- Burger Clown CEO (voiced by Dan Fogler) appears in "Fast Foodie" and "Dollar Sense".
- Rick (voiced by David Harbour) appears in "The Van".
- Community Dan (voiced by Rob Riggle) appears in "Bat Girl".
- Janice (voiced by Lennon Parham) appears in "Papaganda".
- Dirk (voiced by Ken Marino) appears in "No Service".
- Mr. Fluffenfold (voiced by Patton Oswalt) appears in "DependaBill".
- Ms. Torres (voiced by Rosie Perez) appears in "The Delivernator".
- Frilled Lizard (voiced by Wiz Khalifa) appears in "Rembo".
- Tina (voiced by Sydney Park) appears in "Pizza Deliverance".
- Mr. Extras (voiced by Alfonso Ribeiro) appears in "Virtually Christmas".
- Ernie (voiced by Tim Baltz) appears in "Dog Mayor" and "TP'd".
- Merv Stampington (voiced by Danny DeVito) appears in "Long Goodbye".
- Truckee's Mascot (voiced by Justin McElroy) appears in "Truck Stopped".
- Bonnie Spark (voiced by Amy Sedaris) appears in "Jingled".
- Rick Razzle (voiced by Michael Bolton) appears in "Jingled".
- Jessica Burns (voiced by Patricia "Ms. Pat" Williams) appears in "Stand-Up Bill".
- Emcee (voiced by Trevor Wallace) appears in "Stand-Up Bill".
- Serenity Spruce (voiced by Jenny Yokobori) appears in "Junk Junkie".
- Mikey LeBeouf (voiced by Brad Marchand) appears in "Iced".
- Chet Handsomeman (voiced by Tim Meadows) appears in "Iced".
- Corn Dog Vendor (voiced by Tom Green) appears in "Iced".
- Zamboni Toni (voiced by Dean Norris) appears in "Iced".
- Dr. Maya Bloom (voiced by Margo Martindale) appears in "Unguarded".
- Claire (voiced by Cree Summer) appears in "Starter Pack".
- Bank Boss (voiced by Rich Sommer) appears in "Dollar Sense".
- Spider Fang (voiced by Paget Brewster) appears in "Evil Family" and "Chip's Revenge".
- Wolf Fang (voiced by Jeffrey Dean Morgan) appears in "Evil Family" and "Chip's Revenge".
- Sauce Boss (voiced by Matty Matheson) appears in "Freebie Frenzy".
- Chocolate Santa (voiced by Clancy Brown) appears in "Chocolate Santa".
- Archemoris (voiced by Mark Hamill) appears in "One Hundred".
- Mob Leader (voiced by Marc Evan Jackson) appears in "Chip's Revenge".
- Debbie Upton (voiced by Carla Gugino) appears in "Charity Case".
- Allen/Jagger (voiced by Tony Hawk) appears in "Locked In".
- Saxon (voiced by Dan Stevens) appears in "Saxon Saxability" and "Green Journalism".
- Lord Argyle (voiced by David Tennant) appears in "Saxon Saxability".
- Lady Mopsley (voiced by Jennifer Veal) appears in "Saxon Saxability".
- Jim Owner (voiced by Michael Cusack) appears in "Flexed".
- Concerned Gym Bro (voiced by Zach Hadel) appears in "Flexed".
- Hostess (voiced by Vella Lovell) appears in "Short Wait".
- Suzette Blair (voiced by Sheryl Lee Ralph) appears in "Short Wait".
- Santos (voiced by Jorge R. Gutiérrez) appears in "Mulligan'd".
- Dr. Ponderstein (voiced by Mark Hamill) appears in "Rehashed History".
- Ringmaster (voiced by Richard Kind) appears in "Unplanned".
- Tyler (voiced by Cole Sprouse) appears in "Gloria Green".
- Rusty Twang (voiced by Luke Combs) appears in "Daddy Ditty".
- Mikey (voiced by Kyle Mooney) appears in "Daddy Ditty".
- Mr. Brawn (voiced by Mike Colter) appears in "Fitness Test".
- General (voiced by Clark Gregg) appears in "Fitness Test".
- Scientist (voiced by Cobie Smulders) appears in "Fitness Test".
- Hot Potato (voiced by Chad Michael Murray) appears in "The Farmies".
- Farmer Zachariah (voiced by Matt Gourley) appears in "The Farmies".
- Mass Produce Reps (voiced by Matt Gourley and Sona Movsesian) appear in "The Farmies".
- Flute Hippie (voiced by Martha Kelly) "Caging Cricket".
- Mr. Toity (voiced by Rich Sommer) appears in "Trainer Tilly".

== Production ==
The series was pitched in 2012. On March 4, 2016, Disney XD greenlit the series under the title of Country Club. The series is created by the brothers Chris and Shane Houghton, who originally worked on Nickelodeon's Harvey Beaks. Chris Houghton also worked as a storyboard artist on Gravity Falls with Rob Renzetti. The series was later renamed to Big City Greens on July 21, 2017. The show's animation is done entirely in traditional pen and paper as opposed to digital ink, although the colors are still done digitally. Animation is done overseas by Korean animation studios Rough Draft Korea and Sugarcube. The theme song was written and performed by The Mowgli's, and on July 28, 2017, a sneak peek of it was revealed at the 2017 San Diego Comic-Con and was uploaded to Disney XD's YouTube channel on the same day. On June 7, 2018, it was reported that Disney Channel had ordered a second season of Big City Greens ahead of the series' debut. On October 7, 2019, it was announced that the second season would premiere on November 4, 2019; however, it got pushed back to November 16, 2019. On January 13, 2021, the series was renewed for a third season. On January 21, 2022, the series was renewed for a fourth season, which premiered on September 23, 2023. On June 11, 2024, the series was renewed for a fifth season.

During production for the first season, an episode titled "Hands-On History" was in development, with the production number 110. The episode was directed by Monica Ray, from a story by Carson Montgomery, also being written and storyboarded by Caldwell Tanner and Cheyenne Curtis. It featured Mark Hamill in the role of Dr. Ponderstein, a sinister curator who ran a museum. The plot focused on Cricket and Remy at odds with one another, over Ponderstein's method of educating children. The episode was shelved when the Houghton Brothers found Remy's behavior in the episode unlikeable - they could not find a way to make the story work so early in the show's run. On cancelling the episode, co-creator Chris Houghton stated, "[W]e killed that episode for the best of reasons: it just didn't work. We broke and re-broke the story a ton of times. Reboarded it again and again. Sometimes the best course of action is to take your creation out behind the shed, ya know?" Despite prior claims, the episode was revived for season four as "Rehashed History".

== Release ==
When announced, the series was scheduled to premiere in 2018 on Disney XD; however, on March 26, 2018, it was reported that the series would debut on Disney Channel in mid-2018. On May 17, 2018, The Hollywood Reporter reported that the series would premiere on Disney Channel as part of Disney Channel's GO! Summer on June 18, 2018. The series premiere was made available for streaming via the DisneyNow app and the Disney Channel YouTube channel as of June 8, 2018. Additional new episodes premiered every Monday and Wednesday at 10:00 AM throughout the summer. In addition, Big City Greens shorts began airing on Disney Channel and Disney Channel's YouTube channel on June 4, 2018.

New episodes are frequently added to Disney+, sometimes before they even air on Disney Channel. For season one, the episodes are placed in "chronological" order, with some episode pairings getting swapped around to accommodate for this. Co-creator Shane Houghton revealed that the order presented on Disney+ is the true order.

== Reception ==
=== Critical response ===
Big City Greens received generally favorable reviews from critics. Bekah Burbank of LaughingPlace.com praised the characters of the series, writing, "While the mischief and antics are super silly and completely ridiculous, the characters themselves are quite fun. Just like it is with every family, the quirkiness is what you come to love most about the people you spend time with. The Green family might not be perfect, but they're positive, supportive, and optimistic no matter the situation. Everyone could benefit from spending a little time with this wacky family." Dave Trumbore of Collider asserted, "The animated series does a solid job of delivering fish-out-of-water laughs alongside some good, old-fashioned heart, making for a refreshing story that has one foot in the country and one in the city."

Emily Ashby of Common Sense Media gave Big City Greens a grade of four out of five stars and complimented the presence of positive messages and role models, writing, "Big City Greens is a quirky but heartwarming animated series about a family that moves from the country to the city and doesn't quite fit in. Despite mining familiar stereotypes of rural dwellers the show has strong family-centric themes and silly, lighthearted laughs." Jaclyn Appelgate of Comic Book Resources ranked Big City Greens 5th in their "Best Currently Airing Kids' Cartoons" list, saying, "Both children and parents alike are entertained by the hilarious comedy and the lighthearted emphasis on family. Although the plot is simple in nature, being about a country family who goes to live in the big city, it's one of those shows viewers can rely on after a long day. Many fans even consider it a PG version of The Simpsons, which would explain why adults enjoy watching it as well."

=== Ratings ===
Viewership and ratings per season of Big City Greens
Season	Episodes	First aired		Last aired		Avg. viewers (millions)
Season	Episodes	Date	Viewers (millions)	Date	Viewers (millions)	Avg. viewers (millions)
1	30	June 18, 2018	0.68	March 11, 2019	0.61	0.63
2	30	November 16, 2019	0.54	April 3, 2021	0.31	0.45
3	20	October 9, 2021	0.39	March 25, 2023	0.17	0.27
4	30	September 23, 2023	0.15	August 9, 2025	TBD	0.05

Nielsen Media Research, which records viewership on certain American television screens, reported that Big City Greens accumulated 22.5 billion minutes of viewing across linear television and streaming platforms between September 22, 2025, and September 20, 2026, ranking as the ninth most-watched animated series during that period.

=== Accolades ===
Year	Award	Category	Nominee(s)	Result	Ref.
2020	Annie Awards	Outstanding Achievement for Voice Acting in an Animated Television/Broadcast Production	Marieve Herington	Nominated	
2020	Daytime Creative Arts Emmy Awards	Outstanding Individual Achievement in Animation	Steve Lowtwait	Won	
2021	Annie Awards	Outstanding Achievement for Storyboarding in an Animated Television/Media Production	Kiana Khansmith	Nominated	
2023	Children's and Family Emmy Awards	Outstanding Children's or Young Teen Animated Series	Big City Greens	Nominated	
2023	Children's and Family Emmy Awards	Outstanding Casting for an Animated Program	Tatiana Bull, Aaron Drown	Nominated	
2024	Nickelodeon Kids' Choice Awards	Favorite Cartoon	Big City Greens	Nominated	
2026	Nickelodeon Kids' Choice Award	Favorite Cartoon	Big City Greens	Pending	

== Film ==
Along with a fourth season, a musical film was announced to be in development, with the series' main cast returning along with Cheri Oteri and Renée Elise Goldsberry. Series director Anna O'Brian will helm the film, with Michael Coughling producing. The film is titled Big City Greens the Movie: Spacecation. It premiered on June 6, 2024, on Disney Channel, followed by its release on Disney+ the next day. The events of the film take place during the fourth season of Big City Greens. It is the first animated Disney Original Movie (banner used for Disney Channel's television films since 2023).

== Spin-off ==
Meredith Roberts, EVP of Disney Television Animation, revealed in 2024 that a spin-off series was being developed, though she did not specify what it would entail.

== In other media ==
=== Video game ===
A multiplayer game titled Big City Battle!, where players compete against each other in order to earn a place as a member of the Green family, was released on the DisneyNOW app.

=== NHL broadcasts ===
On March 14, 2023, ESPN presented a youth-oriented, Big City Greens-themed telecast of a National Hockey League game between the Washington Capitals and the New York Rangers—the NHL Big City Greens Classic —on Disney Channel, Disney XD, Disney+ and ESPN+. The broadcast leveraged the NHL Edge player and puck tracking system, combined with technology from Beyond Sports, to present a real-time 3D animated recreation of the game; the teams' players were represented by avatars on an outdoor rink, with Vincent Trocheck and Evgeny Kuznetsov being portrayed by avatars of Cricket and Tilly respectively (with their voice actors also using live facial motion capture), and the goalies portrayed by Gramma Alice and Bill Green. Gloria and Remy also joined the game during the last few minutes. Commentators Kevin Weekes and Drew Carter were featured via motion captured avatars, developed by the animation studio Silver Spoon (which had previously worked with CBS Sports and Nickelodeon on similar motion captured avatars for segments of youth-oriented NFL broadcasts). The broadcast on Disney Channel drew approximately 140,000 viewers, while the Disney XD simulcast had roughly 30,000, for a total of 176,000 viewers. In November 2023, it was reported that the simulcast would return in 2024, later specified as a March 9 game between the Pittsburgh Penguins and the Boston Bruins. The Disney Channel broadcast drew 125,000 viewers.
