= Artemis Pebdani =

American actress

- Born: Texas, U.S.
- Years active: 2004–present

Artemis Pebdani is an American actress, best known for her roles as Susan Ross on Scandal, Artemis Dubois on It's Always Sunny in Philadelphia, and Gramma Alice on Big City Greens.

== Early life ==
Pebdani was born and raised in Texas. Her parents were Iranians who left Iran five years before the Islamic Revolution in 1979.

== Career ==
Since 2005, Pebdani has had the recurring role of Artemis, the foul-mouthed friend of Sweet Dee, in the FX comedy series It's Always Sunny in Philadelphia. In 2013, she appeared in the music video for the New Kids on The Block single "Remix (I Like The)".

Pebdani has had guest starring roles on How I Met Your Mother, Modern Family, Brooklyn Nine-Nine, Hot in Cleveland, and House of Lies. In 2014, she played the role of Flo Packer in the second season on the Showtime drama Masters of Sex. In 2015, she joined the cast of Shonda Rhimes's political drama Scandal as Susan Ross, the new Vice President of the United States. In 2016, she joined the cast of the Fox comedy Son of Zorn as Linda Orvend.

Since 2018, Pebdani has voiced Alice Green in the Disney Channel animated series Big City Greens. In 2020, she appeared in Disney+ film Godmothered.

== Filmography ==
=== Film ===
Year	Title	Role	Notes
2014	Sex Tape	Kia	
2015	Quarter-Life Crisis	Linda	
2016	I Love You Both	Linda	
2016	Rainbow Time	Justine	
2018	Dude	Sapphire	
2020	Godmothered	Duff	
2020	The Croods: A New Age	Additional voices	
2022	Sex Appeal	Ms. Carlson	
2022	Puss in Boots: The Last Wish	Jan Serpent (voice)	
2023	Fool's Paradise	Makeup Woman #2	
2024	Big City Greens the Movie: Spacecation	Alice Green (voice)	

=== Television ===
Year	Title	Role	Notes
2004	The Shield	Witness Woman	Episode: "Cracking Ice"
2005–present	It's Always Sunny in Philadelphia	Artemis Dubois	Recurring role, 20 episodes
2006	Jake in Progress	Beth Peters	Episode: "Notting Hell"
2006	Help Me Help You	Office Worker	Episode: "Pilot"
2006	Big Day	Dina	Episode: "The Bachelor Party"
2007	Ugly Betty	Rita	Episode: "A League of Their Own"
2008	Rules of Engagement	Waitress	Episode: "Buyer's Remorse"
2009	House	Diane	Episode: "Broken"
2010–2011	How I Met Your Mother	Anna	3 episodes
2010–2011	Modern Family	Bethenny	2 episodes
2012	Raising Hope	Tarot Reader	Episode: "Tarot Cards"
2013	Brooklyn Nine-Nine	Carlene	Episode: "The Tagger"
2013	Drunk History	Herself	Episode: "San Francisco"
2014	Garfunkel and Oates	Janice	3 episodes
2014	Masters of Sex	Flo Packer	Recurring role, 7 episodes
2014–2016	Scandal	Susan Ross	Recurring role, 19 episodes
2015	Hot in Cleveland	Miss O'Roarke	Episode: "About a Joy"
2015	House of Lies		Episode: "Trust Me, I'm Getting Plenty of Erections"
2015	New Girl	Martha Yowtz	Episode: "Par 5"
2015	Another Period	Hortense Bellacourt	Pilot
2015	You're the Worst	Kasia	Episode: "A Rapidly Mutating Virus"
2016–2017	Son of Zorn	Linda Orvend	Main cast; 11 episodes
2017	Agents of S.H.I.E.L.D.	L.T. Koenig	Episode: "Hot Potato Soup"
2017	Superstore	Nurse Ella	Episode: "Wellness Fair"
2017	Life in Pieces	Gittel	Episode: "Favorite Vision Miguel Matchmaker"
2018–present	Big City Greens	Alice Green (voice)	Main cast
2018	The Cool Kids	Allison	Recurring role
2019	Future Man	Dr. Mina Ahmadi	Recurring role
2019	Rapunzel's Tangled Adventure	Captain Creighton (voice)	Episode: "Who's Afraid of the Big, Bad Wolf?"
2019	Santa Clarita Diet	Jenny	Episode: "Cult of Sheila"
2020–2024	Star Trek: Lower Decks	Ensign Karavitus (voice)	3 episodes
2021	The Big Leap	Bernadette	Episode: "Big Dumb Life"
2021–2023	The Croods: Family Tree	Gran (voice)	Main cast
2022	Grace and Frankie	Madame Elsbeth	2 episodes
2022	Love, Victor	Rahim's mother	2 episodes
2022	Grey's Anatomy	Sharon Peters	Episode: "Wasn't Expecting That"
2022	Monster High: The Movie	Witch	Television film
2023	Monster High	Mummy de Nile (voice)	TV series; episode: "Pet Problems"
2025	Chibiverse	Alice Green (voice)	Episode: "Grandparent Napped"

=== Video games ===
Year	Title	Role	Notes
2020	Fallout 76: Wastelanders	Frida Madani	
2020	Fallout 76: Steel Dawn	Paladin Leila Rahmani	
2021	The Artful Escape	Frida/Various	

=== Music videos ===
Year	Artist	Title	Role	Notes
2013	New Kids on The Block	"Remix (I Like The)"	Lead	
