= Bob Joles =

American voice actor (born 1959)

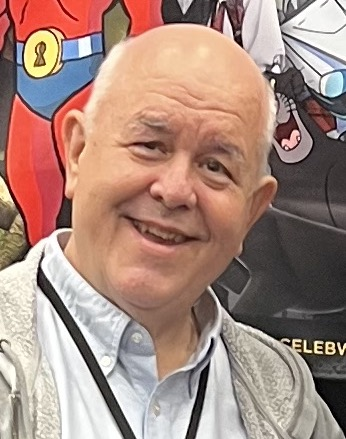
- Joles at SacAnime Roseville in 2025
- Born: Robert W. Joles; July 16, 1959 (age 67); Los Angeles County, California, U.S.
- Other name: Rob Joles
- Occupation: Voice actor
- Years active: 1981–present

Robert W. Joles (born July 16, 1959) is an American voice actor.

== Career ==
He is known for voicing many characters in many television shows, most notably the voice of Man Ray in SpongeBob SquarePants (replacing John Rhys-Davies), and Bill Green in Big City Greens. He also provided the voice of Bagheera in segments for the Jungle Cubs television series and The Jungle Book 2, and currently voices Grape Ape.

== Filmography ==
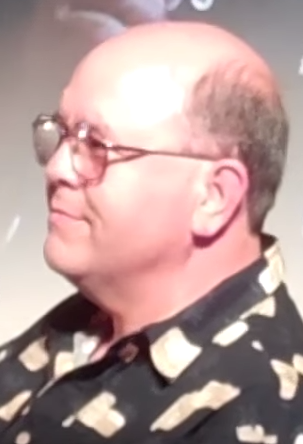
Joles in 2011

=== Animation ===
Year	Title	Role	Notes
1998–2000	Godzilla: The Series	Hank/Pilot/Oil Worker	3 episodes
1999	Oh Yeah! Cartoons	Migmar Magma, Manager, Betty, Plant Babies	2 episodes
2000	Batman Beyond	Driver	Episode: "Betrayal"
2001	House of Mouse	Sneezy	Episode: "Donald's Pumbaa Prank"
2001	Time Squad	Benjamin Franklin, Ludwig van Beethoven, Orville Wright	2 episodes
2002	Samurai Jack	Cacciatore, Customer, Worm Handler	Episode: "Chicken Jack"
2003	The Powerpuff Girls	Guard, Clerk	Episode: "Seed No Evil"
2003–2005	My Life as a Teenage Robot	Various characters	4 episodes
2004	Johnny Bravo	Bear, Cowman, Mobster	Episode: "Wilderness Protection Program"
2004–2006	The Grim Adventures of Billy & Mandy	Ground Control, Cheese Puff Dealer, Mack; Mini Mart Employee, Uncle Chokey; Ulik, Druid #2, Dwarf #1	4 episodes
2005	Justice League Unlimited	Hades	Episode: "The Balance"
2005	Duck Dodgers	Skunderbelly	Episode: "Good Duck Hunting"
2006–2007	Danny Phantom	Frostbite	2 episodes
2006–2008	The Suite Life of Zack & Cody	Mr. Tipton (voice only)	
2007–present	SpongeBob SquarePants	Man Ray, additional voices	11 episodes
2008–2009	Chowder	Mr. Fugu, various voices	4 episodes
2010–2013	Planet Sheen	Nesmith, various voices	19 episodes
2014	Clarence	Mitch	Episode: "Lost in the Supermarket"
2015–2025	Blaze and the Monster Machine	Santa Claus	4 episodes
2017	Elena of Avalor	Lord Elrod	Episode: "The Princess Knight"
2017	Be Cool, Scooby-Doo!	Ray	Episode: "Silver Scream"
2018–present	Big City Greens	Bill Green	Main role
2018–2019	Spider-Man	J. Jonah Jameson, additional voices	16 episodes
2019	Green Eggs and Ham	Various characters	6 episodes
2022	The Patrick Star Show	Man Ray, additional voices	2 episodes
2024	Kamp Koral: SpongeBob's Under Years	Man Ray, additional voices	Episode: "Mermaid Men and Barnacle Boys"
2025	Chibiverse	Bill Green	Episode: "Grown Ups Island"

=== Film ===
Year	Title	Role	Notes
1998	The Thin Pink Line	Mr. Langstrom	
1999	Scooby-Doo! and the Witch's Ghost	Jack	Direct-to-video
2002	The Wacky Adventures of Ronald McDonald: Have Time, Will Travel	Mayor McCheese, Mob Man, Knight	Direct-to-video
2003	The Jungle Book 2	Bagheera	
2004	The Lion King 1½	Sneezy (cameo)	Direct-to-video
2006	The Wild	Camo, Ringleader	
2006	The Ant Bully	Wasp #2	
2008	The Spiderwick Chronicles	Goblins	
2011	Puss in Boots	Giuseppe	
2012	Ernest & Celestine	Additional voices	English dub
2015	Top Cat Begins	Additional voices	English dub
2018	Batman: Gotham by Gaslight	Mayor Tolliver	Direct-to-video
2023	Once Upon a Studio	Cogsworth	Short film
2024	Big City Greens the Movie: Spacecation	Bill Green	Disney Channel Original Movie

=== Video games ===
- Armored Core V – Oswald Warwickshire, AC Pilot
- Champions of Norrath: Realms of EverQuest – Additional voices
- Chocobo GP – Odin
- CSI: New York: The Game – Ezio Moretti, Lucas Trenton
- Destroy All Humans! – Scientist, G-Man
- Dirge of Cerberus: Final Fantasy VII – Grimoire Valentine
- Epic Mickey – Gremlin Gus
- EverQuest II – Modinite Z'Vol, Lieutenant llgar, Marshal Glorfel, Timothy Cooper, Olabumi Rashita, Koth Klorn, Generic Night Blood Warrior Enemy
- Fantastic Four – Blastaar
- Final Fantasy XV – Iedolas Aldercapt
- Final Fantasy VII Remake – Additional voices
- God of War II – Barbarian King, Icarus
- Guild Wars – King Adelbern, Additional voices
- Guild Wars 2 – Bohcht, Ijint, Nahautl, King Adelbern
- Guild Wars: Factions – Count zu Heltzer
- Heroes of Might and Magic V – Wulfstan, Demon Sovereign, Orc 3
- Infamous – Additional voices
- Infamous Second Son – Additional voices
- Jeanne d'Arc – Bishop
- Kingdom Hearts II – Additional voices
- Kingdom Hearts Birth by Sleep – Sneezy
- Lego The Lord of the Rings – Various voices
- Lemony Snicket's A Series of Unfortunate Events – Uncle Monty
- Lightning Returns: Final Fantasy XIII – Additional voices
- The Lord of the Rings: Conquest – Gimli, Treebeard, Uruk-Hai Officer
- Metal Gear Solid 4: Guns of the Patriots – PMC Commander
- Middle-earth: Shadow of Mordor – Orcs
- Mighty No. 9 – Dr. Blackwell
- Murdered: Soul Suspect – Additional voices
- Neopets: The Darkest Faerie – Werelupe King
- Neopets: Petpet Adventures: The Wand of Wishing – Archos
- Nicktoons MLB – Mr. Nesmith
- Party Pursuit – Man Ray, Plankton's Cousin
- Shadows of the Damned – Demons
- Skylanders: Trap Team – Additional voices
- SpongeBob SquarePants: Lights, Camera, Pants! – Man Ray
- SpongeBob's Truth or Square – Mr. Krabs
- SpongeBob's Boating Bash – Mr. Krabs
- SpongeBob Moves In! – Mr. Krabs and Man Ray
- SpongeBob: Patty Pursuit - Man Ray
- Spider-Man 3 – Kingpin
- Stormrise – Scorpion Driver, Sentinel Soldier
- The Jungle Book Groove Party – Bagheera
- The Lego Movie Videogame – Additional voices
- The Secret World – Henry Hawthorne
- The Sopranos: Road to Respect – Additional voices
- The Wonderful 101 – Laambo, Walltha, Gimme
- Van Helsing – Mr. Hyde
- Warhammer Online: Wrath of Heroes – Elgrim
- White Knight Chronicles – King Vallos
- World of Final Fantasy – Odin
- World of Warcraft: Warlords of Draenor – Additional voices
- World of Warcraft: Battle for Azeroth – Harbormaster Cyrus Crestfall

=== Internet ===
- Sock Puppet Theatre – Jonas Sock
- Starship – Recruitment Video Narrator
- A Very Potter Senior Year – Narrator

=== Theme parks ===
- Indiana Jones Adventure: Temple of the Forbidden Eye – Sallah
- Disneyland Railroad – Narrator
- SpongeBob SquarePants 4D: The Great Jelly Rescue – Mr. Krabs
