= Chris Houghton =

American animator and voice actor

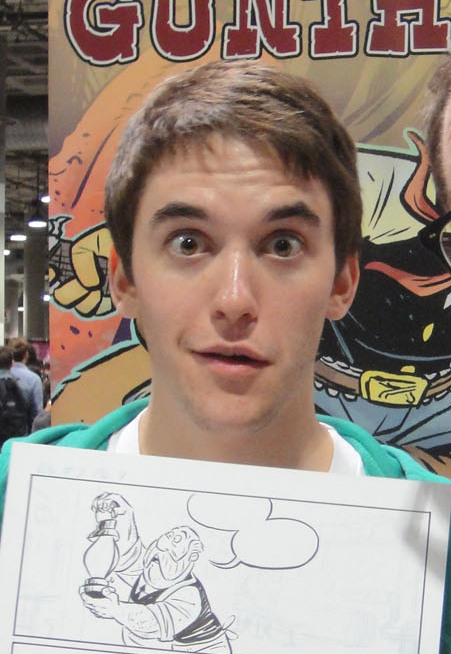
- Houghton at Comikaze Expo in 2011
- Born: Christopher Colin Houghton; May 23, 1988 (age 38); St. Johns, Michigan, U.S.
- Education: College for Creative Studies
- Occupations: Animator, illustrator, writer, director, musician, voice actor
- Employer(s): Disney Television Animation; Nickelodeon Animation Studio
- Spouse: Kassandra Heller
- Relatives: Shane Houghton (brother)
- Writing career
- Years active: 2011–present
- Notable work: Big City Greens

Christopher Colin Houghton (born May 23, 1988) is an American animator, illustrator, writer, director, musician, and voice actor. He is the co-creator and executive producer of the Disney Channel animated series Big City Greens, on which he voices the main character Cricket Green.

== Early life ==
Houghton was born in St. Johns, Michigan. His parents are Noel and Larry Houghton. He attended the College for Creative Studies in Detroit, where he majored in illustration.

== Career ==
Houghton began his career as a storyboard revisionist on the Nickelodeon series Fanboy & Chum Chum and worked as an artist for Bongo Comics, Mad, and Boom! Studios. He often collaborates with his older brother, writer Shane Houghton, with whom he co-created the Reed Gunther comic book series.

Houghton served as a storyboard artist on Disney XD's Gravity Falls and Wander Over Yonder before later working as a storyboard director on Nickelodeon's Harvey Beaks.

In March 2016, Disney XD announced that it had picked up an animated series by the Houghton brothers, originally titled Country Club and later renamed Big City Greens. Houghton voices the main character, Cricket Green. After initially only providing the voice for early production, his performance impressed Walt Disney Company CEO Bob Iger during an advanced screening.

In February 2024, the Houghton brothers signed a multiyear overall production deal with Disney Branded Television.

== Personal life ==
Houghton is married to animator and artist Kassandra Heller.

In 2009, Houghton was the recipient of the Jay Kennedy Memorial Scholarship from the National Cartoonists Society.

== Filmography ==
=== Film ===
Year	Title	Credit	Notes
2024	Big City Greens the Movie: Spacecation	Cricket Green (voice)	Writer, executive producer

=== Television ===
Year	Title	Credit	Notes
2011–2012	Fanboy & Chum Chum	Storyboard revisionist	
2012–2014	Gravity Falls	Character designer (season 1), Storyboard revisionist, Storyboard artist	
2013	Adventure Time	Character designer, Prop designer	Episode: "Sky Witch"
2013–2014	Wander Over Yonder	Storyboard revisionist, Storyboard artist	
2014	Clarence	Character designer	Episode: "The Forgotten"
2014	Mickey Mouse	Writer, Storyboard artist	Episode: "Clogged"
2015–2017	Harvey Beaks	Writer, Storyboard director	
2018–present	Big City Greens	Cricket Green (voice)	Co-creator, writer, storyboard artist, executive producer, director
2022–2023	The Owl House	Bill (voice)	2 episodes
2022–present	Chibiverse	Cricket Green (voice)	9 episodes

== Bibliography ==
- Houghton, Shane; Houghton, Chris (November 22, 2011). Reed Gunther, Vol. 1: The Bear-Riding Cowboy. Image Comics. ISBN 9781607064626.
- North, Ryan; Paroline, Shelli (illustrator); Lamb, Braden (illustrator); Houghton, Chris (illustrator); Brown, Jeffrey (illustrator) (February 8, 2012). Adventure Time #1. BOOM! Studios. ISBN 978-1637156513.
- Houghton, Shane; Houghton, Chris (August 7, 2012). Reed Gunther, Vol. 2: Monsters and Mustaches!. Image Comics. ISBN 9781607065562.
- Pope, Paul; Renier, Aaron; Houghton, Chris (illustrator) (October 1, 2013). Adventure Time: Sugary Shorts, Vol. 1. BOOM! Studios. ISBN 9781608863617.
