= Cocoa Brown =

American actress, writer and comedian

- Born: Farah Brown; Newport News, Virginia, U.S.
- Occupation: Actress
- Years active: 2001–present

Farah "Cocoa" Brown is an American actress, writer and comedian. She is best known for playing Jennifer in For Better or Worse and Lytia in The Single Moms Club.

== Early life, education ==
Brown was born as Farah Brown in Newport News, Virginia. She attended and graduated from Virginia Commonwealth University. She also has a Master of Science degree from The University of Phoenix in Secondary Education.

== Career ==
Brown has performed in many different comedy stage shows including BET's ComicView and One Mic Stand and Showtime at the Apollo. She later began appearing on television, playing guest starring roles on ER and Breaking Bad.

In 2011, Brown was cast in the Oprah Winfrey Network comedy series Tyler Perry's For Better or Worse playing the role of Jennifer, Tasha Smith's character best friend. The series ran for six seasons. In 2014, she played the leading role alongside Nia Long, Wendi McLendon-Covey, Zulay Henao and Amy Smart in the comedy-drama film The Single Moms Club. She received positive reviews for her performance. The following year, she appeared in a supporting role in a comedy film Ted 2.

In 2016, Brown played juror Jeanette "Queen B" Harris in the FX drama series The People v. O. J. Simpson: American Crime Story produced by Ryan Murphy. In 2018, she worked again with Ryan Murphy, playing the recurring role of Carla Price opposite Connie Britton and Mariette Hartley in the Fox drama series 9-1-1.

== Personal life ==
On February 18, 2024, Brown's house in Fayetteville, Georgia burned down. Tyler Perry offered her $400,000 to help buy a new home.

== Filmography ==
=== Film ===
Year	Film	Role	Notes
2003	Blue Moon	M.C.	Short film
2006	Mahoghany Blues	Lawanza	Short film
2008	Attitude for Destruction	Sexy Reporter	Direct-to-video
2008	Lakeview Terrace	Bartender	
2008	An American Carol	Airport Security Guard 1	
2009	Robbin' in da Hood	Mae Mae	Direct-to-video
2009	Dukes and the Dutchess	Raven Dukes	
2010	Friendship!	Polizistin	
2010	Dad's Home	Crossing Guard	Television film
2010	I Want Candy	Chantelle	Short film
2014	The Single Moms Club	Lytia	
2015	Ted 2	Joy	
2017	Chi Nu Legacy	Professor Stewart	
2018	The Other Side	Wedding Planner	
2019	His, Hers & the Truth	Mrs. Smith	
2019	Happy Thanksgiving	Claudia	
2020	Lethal Procedures	Beverly Smith	
2020	Brother's Grim	Grace	
2020	Fruits of the Heart	Ms. Woods	
2023	Praise This	Cora	

=== Television ===
Year	Title	Role	Notes
2004	The Young and the Restless	Woman #4	1 episode
2004	Las Vegas	Lady Behind The Counter	Episode: "Tainted Love"
2007	America's Got Talent	Herself (Contestant)	2 episodes
2007	ER	Judy	Episode: "From Here to Paternity Esinam"
2009	Breaking Bad	Mail Lady	Episode: "Peekaboo"
2009	Secret Girlfriend	Jamilla	Episode: "You Try to Make Some Internet Cash"
2011	Victorious	Nurse	Episode: "Tori Gets Stuck"
2011	2 Broke Girls	Woman	Episode: "Pilot"
2012	Austin & Ally	Security Guard	Episode: "Rockers & Writers"
2011–2017	Tyler Perry's For Better or Worse	Jennifer	Series regular, 162 episodes
2012	GCB	Chardonnay	Episode: "A Wolf in Sheep's Clothing"
2012	The Soul Man	Sister Williams	Episode: "Lost in the Move"
2013	Don't Trust the B— in Apartment 23	Female Neighbor	Episode: "The Scarlet Neighbor..."
2013	Mr. Box Office	Midge	Episode: "The Golden Apple"
2013	Psych	Big Wendy	Episode: "Deez Nups"
2015	K.C. Undercover	Big Ange	Episode: "Operation Other Side Part 1"
2016	American Crime Story	Jeanette "Queen B" Harris	Recurring role, 5 episodes
2017	Marlon	Nurse Patrice	Episode: "Hospital Party"
2018–2023	9-1-1	Carla Price	Recurring role, 11 episodes
2019, 2021	The Neighborhood	Regina	Episodes: "Welcome to Bowling" and "Welcome to the Invasion"
2020–2023	Never Have I Ever	Principal Grubbs	Recurring role; 14 episodes
2023-2024	The Big Door Prize	Principal Pat	Recurring role
2024	Miss Cleo: Her Rise and Fall	Call Center Manager	TV movie
