= Kendra C. Johnson =

American actress

- Born: Hartford, Connecticut, U.S.
- Occupation: Actress
- Years active: 2005–present

Kendra C. Johnson is an American actress. She is best known for her role as Linda Love-Harris in the sitcom Tyler Perry's Love Thy Neighbor.

== Career ==
During her career, she has done many acting roles in the entertainment industry including her roles as Stacey in the movie Phat Girlz and recurring role as Renee in The CW/BET series The Game. In May 2013, it was announced she would join the cast of the new sitcom Love Thy Neighbor. She is the star of the hit OWN TV series.

== Filmography ==
Film
Year	Title	Role	Notes
1999	Trippin'	Alicia (uncredited)	
2006	Phat Girlz	Stacey	
2014	Tyler Perry's Single Mom's Club	Alicia	
2020	#WATCh	Kendra C. Johnson	Short
2021	The Job	Natalie Foster	
2022	Thoughts Are Things	Miss Libby Nelson	Short
2022	The First Noelle	Sabrina	

Television
Year	Title	Role	Notes
2005	The Shield	Eliza	1 episode
2006	Strong Medicine	Sierra Atkins	1 episode
2006	Bones	Dr. Roberta Avery	1 episode
2007	The Game	Renee Royce	3 episodes
2010	'Til Death	Marie	1 episode
2011	Glass Heels	Angel	TV movie
2013–2017	Love Thy Neighbor	Linda Love-Harris	Daughter of Hattie (the wilderbeast)
2021	Kirk Franklin's A Gospel Christmas	Miss Dee	TV movie
