= Love Thy Neighbor (American TV series) =

American television sitcom (2013–17)

- Genre: Sitcom
- Created by: Tyler Perry
- Written by: Tyler Perry
- Directed by: Tyler Perry
- Starring: Palmer Williams; Patrice Lovely; Kendra C. Johnson; Andre Hall; Zulay Henao; Darmirra Brunson; Jonathan Chase; Tony Grant; Leigh-Ann Rose
- Theme music composer: Elvin D. Ross
- Country of origin: United States
- Original language: English
- No. of seasons: 5
- No. of episodes: 118 (list of episodes)

Production
- Executive producer: Tyler Perry
- Producer: Ozzie Areu
- Camera setup: Multi-camera
- Running time: 21 minutes
- Production company: Tyler Perry Studios

Original release
- Network: Oprah Winfrey Network
- Release: May 29, 2013 – August 19, 2017

Related
- House of Payne

Love Thy Neighbor is an American television sitcom broadcast from May 29, 2013 to August 19, 2017 on the Oprah Winfrey Network. The series is written, directed and executive produced by Tyler Perry. The series serves as a spin-off of the Madea franchise. It also acquired the second highest-rated series premiere on the Oprah Winfrey Network, after another Perry program, The Haves and the Have Nots.

The second season of the series premiered on Wednesday, January 8, 2014. The third season of Love Thy Neighbor premiered on Wednesday, January 7, 2015. The fourth season of the series premiered on Friday, January 8, 2016, while the second half premiered on July 1, 2016. OWN announced the fifth and final season, which premiered on Saturday, March 4, 2017. The second half of the series premiered on July 29, 2017. The series concluded on August 19, 2017, ending with 118 episodes in total.

== Plot ==
Love Thy Neighbor is a half-hour sitcom revolving around diner owner Hattie Mae Love (Patrice Lovely) and her middle-class family's daily triumphs and struggles. The show's focal point is the Love Train Diner, an old locomotive car converted to a diner that serves up all of Hattie Mae's favorite recipes. It is the neighborhood hangout that, along with great food, serves up fun and offers advice to customers. It also deals with all the drama that Hattie Mae's daughter Linda (Kendra C. Johnson) faces in her life from bad husbands, to bad boyfriends, to good ones, to having a baby girl.

== Episodes ==
Season	Episodes	Originally released	
Season	Episodes	First released	Last released
1	26	May 29, 2013	August 21, 2013
2	26	January 8, 2014	September 10, 2014
3	22	January 7, 2015	July 31, 2015
4	22	January 8, 2016	September 2, 2016
5	22	March 4, 2017	August 19, 2017

== Cast and characters ==
=== Main ===
- Palmer Williams Jr. as Floyd Stanley Jackson (from House of Payne), is Linda's uncle and Danny's great-uncle, through his late brother's marriage to Hattie. Floyd, often jovial and sarcastic, is the superintendent of the apartment building where Danny and his friends live, but he also works at the diner. (At the end of many Tyler Perry plays that Williams has been in, Perry has told him he's "gotta get him his own show".)
- Patrice Lovely as Hattie Mae Love, Linda's cantankerous mother and owner of the Love Train Diner. Hattie is the most vivacious 75-year-old woman you'll ever meet and although she cares deeply for her daughter and grandson she is a strong believer in "tough love". She said that "Linda was so mad she piss her pants". As revealed in the 2016 horror comedy film Boo! A Madea Halloween, Hattie is in a relationship with Madea's brother, Joe Simmons.
- Kendra C. Johnson as Linda Mae Love-Harris, Hattie's daughter and Danny's mother. Despite going through a divorce with her ex-husband Lionel, Linda is often optimistic and cheerful. She is not particularly skilled at anything, but begins working at the diner in episode 6. In the season 2 finale, she becomes pregnant by Phillip. She is clueless of her feelings for Phillip until he doesn't return the ones he earlier had. She is furious that her son married Troy in Las Vegas and has hated her ever since. In the season 3 finale, her water breaks in the diner, but it turns out she was so mad at Danny she wet her pants. In Season 4, according to Hattie, she married Phillip while in the hospital when she thought she was in labor. In Season 5, Linda gave birth to a beautiful baby girl named Celina.
- Andre Hall as Danny Harris, Linda's 24-year-old son and Hattie's grandson. Danny is an industrious, sensitive, strait-laced young man who could be considered a "mama's boy" since he is very protective of his mother. He begins work at the Internet-design firm Beagal and Steve after some persuasion from his best friends Sam and Drew. He is happy about the idea of his mom getting remarried because of the person. He knows about Drew's crush on him, but he does not feel the same. He watches over her cousin Troy for her while she goes out of town. Danny and Troy fall in love and later get married in Vegas in the season 3 finale. In season 4, he struggles to balance a bonded relationship between his mother and his wife.
- Zulay Henao as Marianna Perez (season 1), just moved from Chicago to Atlanta, where she is the manager of the Atlanta office of Beagal and Steve. Henao confirmed via Twitter that she will not appear in the second season. Due to Henao's absence, she had already began production of Perry's 2014 film The Single Moms Club and its television adaption If Loving You is Wrong.
- Jonathan Chase as Sam Parker, a self-proclaimed "wild man", Danny's immature, irresponsible, selfish best friend, coworker, and roommate who sleeps with any girl he finds hot and parties almost every night—until episode 12. He is very attracted to Marianna (it's not mutual). In season 5, Sam falls for Drew and proposes to her in the series finale ("True Feelings").
- Darmirra Brunson as Drew Scott, Danny's friend and coworker, who also happens to have a crush on him. She lived with Marianna in her freshman year at college and has hated her since, because she was the "coat rack" at all the parties. She is also the cousin of Troy, who is Danny's wife.
- Tony Grant as Philip (season 3–5, main; 2, recurring), a man with a crush on Linda who has two kids with his first wife. He kissed Linda many times while she was already in a relationship. After Linda's last boyfriend hurts her, she goes to see Phillip and they have sex; she dumps him the next day—then later finds out she's pregnant from that encounter. In the season 3 finale, he asks Linda to marry him. He was a recurring character in season 2, but became a part of main cast in season 3. During season 3B, he asked Linda to move in with him. In Season 4, they are married while hospitalized.
- Leigh-Ann Rose as Troy (season 4–5, main; 3, recurring), Drew's cousin, who Danny quickly falls hard for towards the end of the third season. In the season 3 finale, Troy marries Danny in Vegas with Hattie as their witness. Season 4 chronicles Troy's struggles to build a relationship with her new mother-in-law Linda, which creates friction between Drew and Sam. She was a recurring character towards the end of the third season. Beginning with season 4, she became a part of the main cast.

=== Recurring ===
- Tyler Perry as Madea (season 3)
- Dawn Parker as Belinda (season 2)
- Thai Douglas as Will (season 2)

== Production and broadcast ==
It was announced on August 21, 2013, that OWN had renewed the series for a second season of 26 episodes, bringing Love Thy Neighbor to a total of 52 episodes in total. Season 2 of Love Thy Neighbor premiered on January 8, 2014, and the season finale aired on September 10, 2014. Season 3 of Love Thy Neighbor premiered on January 7, 2015, and the season finale aired on July 31, 2015.

On February 27, 2015, the series was renewed for the fourth season, and premiered on Friday, January 8, 2016, and the mid-season finale aired on February 12, 2016. Season 4B premiered on July 1, 2016 and aired until September 2, 2016. The fifth and final season premiered on Saturday, March 4, 2017. The second half premiered on July 29, 2017. The series ended on August 19, 2017 on OWN.
