= Lucy Freyer =

Australian actress (born 1996)

- Born: 1 March 1996 (age 30); Sydney, New South Wales, Australia
- Education: Juilliard School (BFA)
- Occupation: Actor
- Years active: 2023–present
- Television: Adults

Lucy Freyer (born 1 March 1996) is an Australian actress.

== Early life and education ==
Freyer grew up in Cremorne, New South Wales, Australia. Her father is a racehorse breeder and her mother works in real estate.

Freyer attended the Wenona School, an all-girls high school in North Sydney, and studied at the Australian Theatre for Young People. In 2014, Freyer moved to New York City after being accepted to the Juilliard School, where she trained in acting for the next four years. She graduated in 2020.

== Career ==
Freyer's first screen acting role after graduation was in the 2023 film Paint, in which she appeared alongside Wendi McLendon-Covey, Owen Wilson, and Michaela Watkins. Between January and April 2023, she played Esther in the off-Broadway play The Wanderers by Ann Ziegler, alongside Katie Holmes and Sarah Cooper for the Roundabout Theatre Company at the Laura Pels Theatre. Freyer won the Theatre World Award for her performance.

In 2024, Freyer played Regina Simonivic in the podcast series The Justice. She and her castmates were nominated for the Ambie Award for Best Performance in Audio Fiction.

Freyer plays Billie in the FX comedy series Adults, created by The Tonight Show writers Ben Kronengold and Rebecca Shaw and executive produced by Nick Kroll, about five housemates in Queens, New York.

== Selected filmography ==
Year	Title	Role	Notes
2023	Paint	Jenna	Film
2025–present	Adults	Billie Schaeffer	Main role
