= Adults (TV series) =

American television sitcom (2025–present)

- Genre: Sitcom
- Created by: Ben Kronengold; Rebecca Shaw
- Showrunners: Karey Dornetto (pilot) (Note: Dornetto is the showrunner and the lead executive producer amongst all the credited ones for the pilot episode. Co-creators Kronengold and Shaw jointly assume co-showrunning duties from the second episode. For the avoidance of doubt given rather peculiar marketing and distribution dynamics of this series, the episode retroactively retitled "The Window" and reordered to be the second episode in broadcast and streaming order upon the Special's release as the first episode ahead of the second season and bearing production code number XNW01001 is the one which technically qualifies as the pilot episode instead of the said Special, this overhaul likewise also renders the aforementioned original second episode titled "Spitroast" and bearing code XNW01002 to be the third episode of the first season and so forth.); Ben Kronengold; Rebecca Shaw
- Starring: Malik Elassal; Lucy Freyer; Jack Innanen; Amita Rao; Owen Thiele
- Opening theme: "Bad Advice" by bby
- Composer: Christopher Bear
- Country of origin: United States
- Original language: English
- No. of seasons: 2
- No. of episodes: 17

Production
- Executive producers: Nick Kroll; Stefani Robinson; Ben Kronengold; Rebecca Shaw; Sarah Naftalis; Alicia Van Couvering; Jonathan Krisel; Karey Dornetto (pilot)
- Producers: Alex Jordan; Ted Miller; Davin Michaels
- Camera setup: Single-camera
- Running time: 20–27 minutes
- Production companies: Good at Bizness Inc.; Home Team; Little Fatties (2025); Harlequitten Inc; FXP

Original release
- Network: FX; FXX
- Release: May 28, 2025 – present

Adults is an American television sitcom created by Ben Kronengold and Rebecca Shaw about a group of friends in their twenties experiencing adulthood in Queens, New York City.

Adults premiered on FX on May 28, 2025, with the full season available the next day on Hulu and FX on Demand. The series was renewed for a second season in October 2025, which premiered on August 27, 2026, on FX and FXX, with the full season available the same day on Hulu and FXX on Demand. A special prequel episode premiered on July 31, 2026. In November 2026, the renewal for a 16-episode third season was announced. The series has received widespread critical acclaim, often drawing comparisons to previous hangout sitcoms like Friends (1994–2004) and New Girl (2011–2018).

== Premise ==
Adults follows a group of young friends—Samir (Elassal), Billie (Freyer), Paul Baker (Innanen), Issa (Rao), and Anton (Thiele)—as they navigate the challenges of early adulthood while living together in Samir's childhood home. The series explores themes such as career struggles, healthcare, modern dating, and social dynamics, portraying both the comedic and difficult aspects of transitioning into adult life. The series is set in Queens, New York.

== Cast ==
=== Main ===
- Malik Elassal as Samir Rahman, Billie's childhood friend from Bayside, Queens who is allowing his friends to stay in his parents' home rent-free. Samir is generally good-natured and a caring friend, especially towards Billie, but can be selfish and prone to neuroticism. He is in a long-term relationship with Carly for most of the show, but they split amicably at the end of the second season.
- Lucy Freyer as Billie Schaeffer, Samir's childhood friend and former next-door neighbor. Billie is the most concerned of the group about being an adult and what that entails, but her attempts to be mature often end in failure. After losing her job as a temp worker for a news agency in the pilot, Billie spends most of the show unemployed and trying to look for a new job. Billie often struggles with relationships, such as one with her high-school teacher, due to her reluctance to grow up.
- Jack Innanen as Paul Baker, Issa's sexually-fluid boyfriend and a recent immigrant from Canada. Almost exclusively referred to by his full name, Paul Baker is kindhearted, sweet, and unfailingly polite to everyone he meets and quickly endears himself to the rest of the group. He works as a waiter for a local diner named Vladi's and occasionally bartends at night for extra money. Paul Baker and Issa are dating when the show begins and he moves into the house in the second episode, but he marries Anton after his visa expires.
- Amita Rao as Issa Damani, Paul Baker's girlfriend and a college friend of Samir and Anton's. Issa is flighty, self-centered, and outgoing, but also a loyal friend. She is a part-time ballet teacher, and also mentions a desire to be a singer and has extensive vocal training. Her parents are wealthy South Asian immigrants originally from London. She dates Paul Baker for most of the show, but breaks up with him in the second season.
- Owen Thiele as Anton Evans, a college friend of Samir and Issa's. Anton is an extroverted people-pleaser known for being extremely charming and able to quickly win people over; however, most of this is superficial and he eventually forgets most people he befriends. Anton works in digital ad sales and is the only member of the group with a well-paying, stable corporate job, which he secretly enjoys. He has an older sister named Talia and is the black sheep of his family, whom he is notably cold and irascible towards. He marries Paul Baker in the first season finale after Paul Baker's visa expires, and eventually has to admit that he has genuine feelings for him.

=== Recurring ===
- Rachel Marsh as Carly, a dental assistant and Samir's girlfriend
- Charlie Cox as "Mr. Teacher" (season 1), Billie and Samir's former high school teacher and Billie's short-lived boyfriend. His name is later revealed to be Andrew.
- Rico Tudico as Vladi (season 2), the owner of Vladi's Diner and Paul Baker's boss
- Liam Cullagh as OJ, one of Paul Baker’s straight bros (season 2)
- Joey Dardano as Schnee, one of Paul Baker’s straight bros (season 2)
- Jordan Kronis as Brent, one of Paul Baker’s straight bros (season 2)
- Will Sennett as Roach, one of Paul Baker’s straight bros (season 2)

=== Guest ===
- Julia Fox as herself, a close friend of Paul Baker
- Julian Manjerico as Zack-Carlos bin Laden, a former college friend of Samir, Anton, and Issa. He married Issa as a joke in college, and is constantly scheming to reinsert himself back into the friend group.
- Will Ropp as Kyle Haberman (season 1), an acquaintance who makes national news after being sexually harassed at work.
- Ray Nicholson as Ethan (season 1), a man Anton befriends on the train. He is later revealed to be the Bayside Stabber.
- Grace Kuhlenschmidt as Taryn (season 1), an acquaintance of Issa's who believes she can commune with the dead.
- Tala Ashe as Hilary (season 1), Mr. Teacher's ex-wife.
- D'Arcy Carden as Allison (season 1), one half of a couple with whom Billie has a threesome.
- John Reynolds as Brian (season 1), one half of a couple with whom Billie has a threesome.
- Susie Essman as Arlene Walters (season 2), the mother of Billie's high school friend Danielle.
- Gaten Matarazzo as Fake Samir (season 2), the first inheritor of Samir's fake ID.
- Isaac Cole Powell as Eric (season 2), a man who Anton makes a connection with at a club.
- Sophie Telegadis as Sophie-Rose (season 2), the current owner of Billie's fake ID.
- Raven-Symoné as Talia (season 2), Anton's older sister with whom he has a tempestuous relationship.
- Ben Marshall as Colin (season 2), a man Billie takes an interest in while clubbing.
- Dylan Arnold as Greg (season 2), Samir's coworker who briefly dates Billie.
- David Paymer as Sandy Adler (season 2), Paul Baker's opponent in the HOA election.
- Zosia Mamet as Nina Adler (season 2), Sandy's mean-spirited daughter.
- Paul Sun-Hyung Lee as Mr. Lee (season 2), a neighbor who holds a grudge against Sandy.
- Mia Fowler as Margaux (season 2), a librarian who befriends Issa.

Additionally, Yvette Nicole Brown voices Anton’s mother over a phone call.

== Episodes ==
Season	Episodes	Originally released	Network
1	8	May 28, 2025	FX
Special		July 31, 2026	FX / FXX
2	8	August 27, 2026	FX / FXX

=== Season 1 (2025) ===
No. overall	No. in season	Title	Directed by	Written by	Original release date (Note: All episodes were released on May 29, 2025 on Hulu and FX on Demand.)	Prod. code
1	1	"Pilot" "The Window"	Jonathan Krisel	Ben Kronengold & Rebecca Shaw	May 28, 2025	XNW01001
Anton, Billie, and Issa are 20-somethings living with their friend Samir in his childhood Queens home while his parents are traveling. Issa tries to convince Samir to allow her new boyfriend, Paul Baker, to move in. They learn that an acquaintance, Kyle, has made national news for being sexually harassed at work. A social movement springs up in support of Kyle, which Anton and Issa join so they can get admiration. Billie, also jealous of the attention Kyle has, is encouraged by Anton and Issa to leverage the unease around Kyle's story to earn a promotion; she gives her superior a veiled threat, only for him to ask her to not return to work. Samir becomes concerned that he has crossed boundaries with his ex-girlfriend Carly when they talk about their past, but she later messages him that they are okay while he is having an awkward hookup with someone else. The group gets high and tries to fix the water heater.
2	2	"Spitroast"	Anu Valia	Ben Kronengold & Rebecca Shaw	May 28, 2025	XNW01002
Billie lets the stress of her job situation overwhelm her to the point where she is rectally bleeding. At the hospital, Samir volunteers to be her proxy, to Issa's envy. The doctor recommends an endoscopy and colonoscopy within two weeks, but Anton reminds the group that Billie's health insurance could be gone by then. Egged on by Issa, Samir insists that the procedures be done that day. Issa feels sidelined and vents in the hospital's chapel. Anton and Paul Baker bond while horsing around, and Anton encourages Samir to let Paul Baker move in. When Billie wakes, she tells the group she was a contractual worker and never had health insurance. She is further disappointed to learn that she was fired for her remark and that the hospital bill is $15,000.
3	3	"Have You Seen This Man?"	Anu Valia	Ben Kronengold & Rebecca Shaw	June 4, 2025	XNW01003
Police alert the neighborhood to a stabber, a man Anton recently befriended on the train. Anton, grappling with his tendency to become overly sociable, goes to the police. In an attempt to help pay Billie's medical bills, Samir and Paul Baker try to sell a shotgun found in the house. Issa encourages Billie to be more sexually adventurous, which results in them unwittingly inviting the stabber, Ethan, into the house. Rather than decline an invitation to dinner, Anton tries to run Ethan over. The police arrive to arrest Ethan after bringing Samir and Paul Baker back to the house.
4	4	"House Rules"	Anu Valia	Sarah Naftalis	June 4, 2025	XNW01004
Issa drops an AirTag into the bag of a man she and Paul Baker encounter at a coffee shop, thinking him to be a perfect match for Anton. Unbeknownst to them, the AirTag is picked up by a rat when it falls out of the bag. Billie visits her old high school, where she mourns her unfulfilled potential. Though the students are unimpressed with her, her teacher Andrew encourages her not to give up. He also helps Billie dispute the medical debt, bringing it down to $2,200, which can be repaid in monthly installments. An elated Billie rewards him with a blow job. Samir successfully interviews for a fintech company, but moons the hiring team and immediately loses the opportunity. He then signs up to be a delivery service worker. Rather than go to a nearby bar where the AirTag has ended up, Anton sneaks back into his bedroom.
5	5	"Theracide"	Jason Woliner	Curtis Cook & Allie Levitan	June 11, 2025	XNW01005
Anton and Issa's shared therapist George dies. While at the funeral, Anton overhears some gossip that appears to indicate George died by suicide, which he and Issa surmise was motivated by their dysfunction. Samir and Paul Baker agree to deliver a case of beer to a group of sophomore boys in exchange for playing video games with them. They continue to party with them, against the friend group's wishes, until the boys invite freshman girls over. Issa and Anton invite a medium for a seance to learn if they were responsible for George's death. Feeling even guiltier, the two make a scene at George's wake, only to learn he died of an accidental head injury. Now officially a couple with "Mr. Teacher", Billie attends an art show with him; she humiliates herself in front of his friends, but he reassures her that he doesn't care what they think.
6	6	"Roast Chicken"	Jason Woliner	Sanaz Toossi	June 11, 2025	XNW01006
Billie organizes a dinner party for the group to meet Mr. Teacher, who confides in Samir that he is high on ketamine due to his difficult divorce and uncertainty about his relationship with Billie. This prompts Samir to prod Billie into breaking up with him. Billie dismisses this, believing Samir to have resurfaced feelings from their childhood. Paul Baker has invited Julia Fox to the dinner, making Issa jealous. The roast chicken Billie has prepared turns out raw, prompting Mr. Teacher to break down and lock himself in the bathroom while insulting Samir and Billie. Billie calls his ex-wife and the guests leave.
7	7	"Annabelle"	Stefani Robinson	Stefani Robinson & Shaun Menchel	June 18, 2025	XNW01007
Anton and Paul Baker are tasked with watching Annabelle, a teenager whom Issa has volunteered to house as she gets an abortion, but the two struggle with Annabelle's icy attitude. Issa takes Billie to her dance students' rehearsal for their recital, but Issa's boss Troy demands that the self-written show Popcorn Forest be canceled in favor of Swan Lake. Issa leads the children in a strike while Billie tries to negotiate with the bosses. Meanwhile, Samir goes upstate with his girlfriend Carly, and feels pressured not to screw it up. He freaks out when he clogs the toilet, but Carly admits she contributed to it too. As they wait for Annabelle outside her appointment, Anton and Paul Baker express attraction to one another. Later, Anton, Billie, Issa, and Paul Baker perform Popcorn Forest for Annabelle and Samir.
8	8	"The Mail"	Nick Kroll	Ben Kronengold & Rebecca Shaw	June 18, 2025	XNW01008
The group goes through its backlog of mail, and Paul Baker learns his visa is expiring and he must return to Canada. To give him a way to stay in the country, Issa proposes to Paul Baker and he accepts. Unbeknownst to him, Issa married an old classmate, Zack-Carlos, years ago as a joke and never finalized the divorce. A priest refuses to facilitate the marriage; meanwhile Samir and Anton are unsuccessful in getting Zack-Carlos to sign the divorce papers. The group goes to a bar, where Issa refuses to tell Paul Baker about her husband while Billie flirts with a couple seeking a third party. Paul Baker confides in Anton that he wants a traditional wedding. The next day, Anton and Samir convince Zack-Carlos to sign by telling him he would get along with Paul Baker. At the courthouse, Issa gets cold feet and Zack-Carlos tells Paul Baker of their divorce. The other housemates each volunteer to marry Paul Baker. Later that night, newlyweds Paul Baker and Anton share a kiss. The power goes out as the group sits down to watch a movie.

=== Special (2026) ===
Prequel episode showing the origin story of the friend group and Paul Baker. The episode was written as a new pilot to be the first episode of the series on FX and streaming platforms Disney+ and Hulu, introducing viewers to the series, as viewership was low for the first season.

No. overall	Title	Directed by	Written by	Original release date	Prod. code
9	"Marathon Day"	Jonathan Krisel	Ben Kronengold & Rebecca Shaw	July 31, 2026	XNW00001
Anton reveals to the others that he told his coworkers he was training for the New York marathon to hide that he has no hobbies. The group rallies to help Anton trick his coworkers into thinking he ran the marathon. While Samir and Issa make signs in a café, he gives her dating advice and tells her to stop settling for losers she wants to fix. An overheated runner, Paul Baker, enters the café and collapses, prompting Issa to jump to his aid. She later tells Samir that she only helped Paul Baker into an Uber and didn't try to "fix" him. While the group celebrates at home, Anton's coworkers show up to congratulate him. Anton scrambles to pretend to be arriving home and encounters Paul Baker on the couch; Issa sent him to the house to recover after making out with him. Paul Baker admires the lengths Anton's friends have gone to in lying for him. When his coworkers ask to see his nonexistent medal, Anton is about to come clean until Paul Baker lends his own medal, earning Anton's respect.

=== Season 2 (2026) ===
No. overall	No. in season	Title	Directed by	Written by	Original release date (Note: All episodes were released on August 27, 2026 on Hulu and FXX on Demand.)	Prod. code	Viewers (millions)
10	1	"The Scrub"	Jonathan Krisel	Ben Kronengold & Rebecca Shaw	August 27, 2026	XNW02001	0.16
Paul Baker and Anton scour the others' social media to find anything that may prevent them from getting new jobs. Billie panics after discovering her former friend Danielle, who posted offensive pictures of her, has passed away, meaning they cannot be removed. She recruits Anton to help her reconnect with Danielle's mom. Issa and Samir discover Paul Baker's all-male friend group that he has kept hidden from them, with whom he behaves completely differently. Issa invites them over against Paul Baker's wishes, so Paul Baker forces his friends to act overly polite, annoying Issa. After Issa purposely riles the boys up into a drunken frenzy, Paul Baker allows his two personalities to mix and forces them out of the house. His friend OJ, who works at Facebook, volunteers to remove Danielle's pictures for Billie in exchange for letting him draw a mustache on her face.
11	2	"Fake ID"	Jonathan Krisel	Ananya Hegde	August 27, 2026	XNW02003	0.14
Billie's former fake ID is used by a stranger, Sophie-Rose, at the bar Paul Baker is working at, causing Billie and Issa to decide to get in touch. Sophie-Rose and her friends make fun of Billie's age, causing her to worry that she is no longer young and fun. Samir begins worrying about the fate of Alex, to whom he gave his fake ID, concerned he may have become an alcoholic. Billie, Samir, and Anton go to a club, where Billie sees Sophie-Rose. Despite embarrassing herself at the club, Billie comes to appreciate her newfound maturity after a mugging causes Sophie-Rose to break down. Samir reconnects with Alex and every other person who has had his ID, finding them all well-adjusted. Anton tries to impress a guy with similar flirting techniques, but ultimately rejects him because of his feelings for Paul Baker. Issa and Paul Baker try to have a romantic night at home, but quickly grow bored. They invite their food delivery driver in to play games, but tensions rise when a game reveals how little Issa knows about Paul Baker.
12	3	"Talia"	Maggie Carey	Shaun Menchel	September 3, 2026	XNW02002	0.18
Anton's sister Talia wants to meet, and Anton becomes convinced she wants him to be her wife's sperm donor. However, Talia laughs at the suggestion, telling Anton she would never want her child to inherit the terrible attitude he has towards his family members. Paul Baker decides to fix Anton's relationship with Talia by organizing a private dinner at the diner he works at, but Talia and her wife Brooke are charmed by Paul Baker and invite him to be their donor, infuriating Anton. The siblings realize that they don't know each other very well and begin to bond over their shared job in digital ad sales. Issa worries about her own fertility and begins the process of freezing her eggs, with Samir and Carly attempting to support her through her chaotic mood swings and intense fear of needles. Issa grows paranoid about the seriousness of their relationship in comparison to her and Paul Baker's. Billie excitedly attends jury duty, only to cause a mistrial by attempting to befriend everyone including the defendant and plaintiff.
13	4	"Raccoon"	Oz Rodriguez	Sanaz Toossi	September 3, 2026	XNW02004	0.14
Issa and Paul Baker decide to host "Acid Night" with Samir initially refusing to participate. Just after the group takes the acid, a raccoon walks through the living room. With only 30 minutes until their trip starts, the group scrambles to trap and release the raccoon. In the chaos, Issa and Paul Baker each reveal to Billie and Samir that they had ulterior motives for Acid Night, and are hoping the drugs will allow them to have a much-needed conversation about the state of their relationship. Billie and Samir promise not to get involved, but end up causing Issa and Paul Baker to each think the other wants to break up with them. Issa tries to seduce Paul Baker, but ends up letting in a possum in addition to the raccoon. Paul Baker accidentally causes Issa to think he wants to open their relationship. Issa initiates a threesome with Paul Baker and Anton, but they are interrupted by the possum, which Issa throws out the window. Paul Baker and Issa finally talk, and mutually decide to break up but remain friends. Just before the timer runs out, Paul Baker and Anton manage to trap the raccoon and let it go outside.
14	5	"Room Swap"	Paul Briganti	Sarah Naftalis	September 10, 2026	XNW02005	N/A
Now that Issa and Paul Baker have broken up, they decide to switch up room assignments in the house. Billie and Issa move in together, as do Samir and Paul Baker, with Anton getting Samir's parents' room to himself. Billie is excited to take newly single Issa out on the prowl, but gets irritated by Issa's awkward and obnoxious behavior around men. Samir and Paul Baker realize that their shared room makes it difficult for them to find time to masturbate privately. They attempt to donate to a sperm bank, but cause a scene and get kicked out. Anton refuses to break his 11-month dry spell, claiming that he is incapable of having casual sex. A frustrated Samir insists that Anton earn the single room by having sex, or else the room swap is off. The next day, Paul Baker volunteers to move out in order to solve the roommate problems while Anton unsuccessfully tries to sneak his hookup, Zack-Carlos, out the door. Zack-Carlos refuses to leave the house and gives Billie advice about Issa. Samir attempts to masturbate in the attic, but accidentally breaks a pipe and causes a carbon monoxide leak. After firefighters forcibly evacuate Zack-Carlos, Billie and Issa make up.
15	6	"Pop Girlie"	Paul Briganti	Rob Rosell	September 10, 2026	XNW02006	N/A
Carly impulsively decides to become a K-pop star instead of finishing dental school, much to Samir's surprise and chagrin. He becomes upset with Anton after Carly reveals that Anton's advice is what caused her career pivot. Anton realizes that the mindless advice and pithy sayings he is always giving out are causing people to make serious mistakes in their lives, and swears off advice for good. Issa is also mad at Anton because he encouraged Carly to become a performer, not her. Billie asks Paul Baker for help getting a job, and together they tailor her resumé to be more attractive to recruiters. However, she ends up turning all of her interviews into hook-ups, leading to her losing an actual job opportunity. Samir helps Carly organize an event launching her new career, but she gets cold feet about performing. Anton decides to start giving advice again and tells Samir to just be honest with Carly, and encourages Issa to perform I Dreamed a Dream in front of the crowd to stall. Samir tells Carly he thinks she is making a mistake but he will support her no matter what, but she agrees and decides not to perform.
16	7	"C Alert"	Oz Rodriguez	Jake Bender & Zach Dunn	September 17, 2026	XNW02007	0.12
Anton slips up by accidentally saying "cunt" in a work meeting, offending his coworkers. Afraid of losing his job, he recruits Issa to come in as a temp and normalize using the word in the workplace. However, Issa becomes comfortable and refuses to say it, replacing Anton as the office's favorite young person. Samir sets Billie up with his coworker Greg, but they have no chemistry and are only continuing to date to keep Samir happy. They try to tell him they want to break up, but he refuses to accept it, causing Greg to quit his job and lie to Samir about moving to Peoria so that he will leave them alone. This causes the pair to finally connect romantically and they sleep together. Issa realizes that Anton actually loves his job and is genuinely afraid of losing it, despite what he tells them at home. Anton takes accountability for offending everyone and apologizes, and his supervisor decides not to escalate the matter further. Issa bursts in and calls Anton a faggot in front of everyone, believing she is sacrificing her own job to save his. Paul Baker must work in Manhattan for the week but gets constantly accosted by man-on-the-street interviewers.
17	8	"Vote for Paul Baker"	Alex Buono	Ben Kronengold & Rebecca Shaw & Sarah Naftalis & Raffi Donatich	September 17, 2026	XNW02008	0.09
Paul Baker is running for president of the Homeowner's Association, and the roommates are hard at work canvassing with the help of Carly and Julia Fox. Billie is threatened by Nina, the incumbent president's daughter, to call off the campaign and let her dad win, otherwise Nina will report the roommates for a zoning violation and have them kicked out of the house. Billie recruits Paul Baker's rowdy friends to help them tank the election and make sure that he loses. Issa and Anton try to discourage voters at the library, where Issa connects with Margaux, the librarian. Carly and Samir are practicing being long-distance, as Carly's dental placement will force her to move to Seattle for a year. After getting advice from Julia, Samir decides to move to Seattle as well, but Carly does not want Samir to move with her and breaks up with him. Issa overhears voters talking about all the nice things Anton has said about Paul Baker during the campaign, and realizes that Anton has genuine feelings for him. She encourages Anton to tell Paul Baker how he feels. Unbeknownst to them, their discussion is being broadcast live to the entire neighborhood, including Paul Baker. As Issa and Anton run home, Paul Baker loses the election. As everyone celebrates the loss, Anton and Paul Baker kiss. Later that night, Issa brings Margaux home and notices that someone is hooking up in Paul Baker and Samir's room. The door opens to reveal not Anton and Paul Baker, but Samir and Billie.

== Release ==
Production took place in Toronto, Canada. Adults premiered with its first two episodes on May 28, 2025, with new episodes scheduled to air in back-to-back pairs every Wednesday at 9 p.m. ET/PT on FX. The full series was released for streaming on Hulu on May 29. Internationally, the series became available on Disney+. In-person promotional events for the series took place at laundromats in New York City and Los Angeles. The second season premiered on FXX on August 27 and features guest appearances by Susie Essman, Raven-Symoné, Gaten Matarazzo, Jake Shane, Isaac Powell, Ben Marshall, and Zosia Mamet. A special prequel episode, which premiered at the 2026 Tribeca Festival on June 11 later premiered on FXX and Hulu on July 31. The show was renewed for a third season in November 2026 and will have 16 episodes.

== Reception ==
=== Critical response ===
Critical response of Adults
Season	Rotten Tomatoes	Metacritic
1	77% (35 reviews)	65 (21 reviews)
2	100% (27 reviews)	79 (10 reviews)

Adults premiered to generally positive reviews from critics. For the first season, review aggregator website Rotten Tomatoes reported a 77% approval rating based on 35 critic reviews with an average rating of 6.6/10. The website's critics consensus reads, "Every generation deserves its own sitcom of likable screwups, and Adults more or less delivers one for Gen-Z with its ensemble of funny and maddening strivers." Metacritic, which uses a weighted average, gave a score of 65 out of 100 based on 21 critics, indicating "generally favorable" reviews. For the second season, which was described as an improvement over its first, Rotten Tomatoes reported a 100% approval rating based on 27 critic reviews with an average rating of 8.1/10. Metacritic, which uses a weighted average, gave a score of 79 out of 100 based on 10 critics, indicating "generally favorable" reviews.

Dave Nemetz of TVLine described Adults as a welcome return to television for stories about people in their twenties. He found that the show captures the chaotic energy of Gen Z life with humor and charm. Nemetz appreciated its blend of influences, noting echoes of Friends, Girls, and especially Broad City, and praised the surreal, irreverent tone. He also complimented the cast of newcomers, highlighting Owen Thiele's performance as a standout. Nemetz said the show delivers big laughs and proves that comedy is still alive and well, even within a more socially conscious landscape. Karl Quinn of The Age said that while Adults adopts the familiar framework of a share-house sitcom, it also functions as a reflection of its cultural moment. He found that the series combines elements of Friends and Girls with contemporary concerns such as identity politics and cancel culture. Quinn appreciated the show's ability to satirize its twenty-something characters' contradictions and posturing while still extending empathy toward them. He singled out the sixth episode as "hilarious" and "unhinged". While acknowledging that not every element of the series is successful, Quinn praised its originality and cultural resonance.

Saloni Gajjar of The A.V. Club wrote that Adults attempts to fill a void of fun, low-stakes hangout sitcoms focused on tight-knit friend groups. She found that while the series does not fully rise to the level of the next great hangout comedy, it shows plenty of potential with laugh-out-loud moments and strong guest stars. Gajjar appreciated how the show taps into the awkwardness and challenges faced by older Gen Zs today, weaving in socio-political commentary reminiscent of Broad City and Search Party. She praised the creators and writers for their comedic backgrounds and the goodwill behind the series, but noted that the humor can sometimes feel over-the-top. Michel Ghanem of TheWrap asserted that Adults marks a strong return to the messy twenty-something friend-group comedy, filling a gap left by shows like Girls and Search Party. He noted that while the pilot may feel a bit overwhelming with heavy themes, the series quickly finds its footing with relatable moments and effortless laughs. Ghanem praised the chemistry among the cast and the show's grounded approach to misadventures, avoiding sitcom clichés. He also highlighted the subtle character development around quarter-life crises and personal growth, suggesting that Adults has the potential to grow into a standout comedy over multiple seasons.

=== Ratings ===
The premiere episode of Adults, which aired on May 28, 2025, had 188,500 household viewers and a 0.15% rating. On June 11, the series recorded 91,000 viewers among viewers aged 2 and older (P2+) and a 0.03% rating, representing a 3% decrease from the previous week. Among adults aged 18–49, the episode had 27,000 viewers and a 0.02% rating, while the 25–54 demographic had 38,000 viewers and a 0.03% rating.

Season 1 saw a 50% increase in streaming viewership following the release of the standalone prequel episode "Marathon Day" on July 31, 2026, a month before the release of season 2. After 12 days of viewing, season 2 had a 40% increase in viewership compared with season 1, accounting for viewers across Hulu and Disney+ globally. International viewership also increased by 100%. Nearly a month after the full season was released, Adults gained attention on TikTok due to a K-pop song featured in an episode.

=== Accolades ===
At the 2026 Queerties Awards, Adults was nominated for TV Comedy, while Owen Thiele was nominated for TV Performance.
