= True Memoirs of an International Assassin =

2016 film by Jeff Wadlow

- Film release poster
- Directed by: Jeff Wadlow
- Screenplay by: Jeff Morris; Jeff Wadlow
- Story by: Jeff Morris
- Produced by: Justin R. Begnaud; Raja Collins; Mark Fasano; Todd Garner
- Starring: Kevin James; Kim Coates; Maurice Compte; Zulay Henao; Andrew Howard; Ron Rifkin; Yul Vazquez; Andy García
- Cinematography: Peter Lyons Collister
- Edited by: Sean Albertson
- Music by: Ludwig Göransson
- Production companies: PalmStar Media; Global Film Group; Broken Road Productions
- Distributed by: Netflix
- Release date: November 11, 2016
- Running time: 98 minutes
- Country: United States
- Language: English

True Memoirs of an International Assassin is a 2016 American action comedy film directed by Jeff Wadlow from a screenplay co-written with Jeff Morris. The film stars Kevin James, Kim Coates, Maurice Compte, Zulay Henao, Andrew Howard, Ron Rifkin, Yul Vazquez and Andy García.

Aspiring author Sam Larson gets thrown into the dangerous, politically volatile Venezuela when his online publisher sells his debut fiction novel about a deadly assassin as non-fiction, so he gets kidnapped to aid a military coup. Thrust into his lead character's world, he must take on the role for his own survival.

The film was released on Netflix on November 11, 2016, and had a primarily negative response from critics.

== Plot ==
Loner Sam Larson has written a fictional novel, Memoirs of an International Assassin, but is struggling with the last line. After his friend Amos, a self-described former Mossad analyst, tells him a wild story about an assassin named Ghost, Larson incorporates this into his novel. Published online, it is reclassified as nonfiction, retitled True Memoirs of an International Assassin.

After Larson, now a bestselling author, appears in a television interview with Katie Couric, he is kidnapped by El Toro, a revolutionary, and taken to Venezuela. El Toro believes that Larson's novel contains information about Venezuelan President Miguel Cueto and assigns him the task of assassinating Cueto.

Larson escapes the revolutionaries, going to the nearest police station. Asking to be taken to the US embassy, he discovers they are the gangster Anton Masovich's henchmen, who demand money. Larson then calls his publisher, Applebaum, but believing that he is playing with her, she hangs up. Before the police can kill him, Larson is saved by DEA agent Rosa Bolivar.

Bolivar gets Larson to talk with drug lord Masovich. He tasks Larson with killing El Toro, as the corrupt Cueto is good for business. He pretends to agree, fearing the violent Masovich. CIA agents William Cobb and Michael Cleveland meet with Cueto and General Ruiz about Larson, and decide to meet with him.

Larson and Bolivar are found by Juan, who takes Larson hostage. The men then talk about the situation regarding Cueto. Larson tries to get Juan to steal a truck, but in the process, he gets captured by General Ruiz. The general tells Larson to kill Masovich (as he has too much power) or he will be tried and executed for conspiring to assassinate Cueto, prompting him to cooperate. Cobb and Cleveland decide to get Larson killed by informing Masovich, who goes into a violent rage upon hearing of his betrayal.

Larson updates Bolivar, who then admits she has always wanted to kill Masovich, as he caused the DEA to write her off. She devises a plan to humiliate both Masovich and Cueto. Larson initially refuses, but they narrowly escape a sudden attack by Masovich's thugs, during which he is shot in the shoulder.

Larson and Bolivar return to El Toro's to infiltrate the inauguration ball and murder Cueto. When they arrive, Ruiz reminds Larson to kill Masovich. When Masovich spots Larson and attempts to kill him, Bolivar distracts him. Juan, disguised as a waiter, reminds him of El Toro's orders. After they dance, Bolivar and Masovich fight upstairs.

Larson tricks Cueto into confessing his plan to kill Masovich. When Cueto realises he was recorded, being depressed and hating his life, he promptly kills himself. The fight between Bolivar and Masovich reaches Cueto's office and ends with Masovich dying of a gunshot wound.

Ruiz arrests Larson and Bolivar, but sends them to El Toro's, where Juan apologizes to Larson for not believing him. El Toro hires Bolivar for the revolution, and plans to kill Larson for knowing too much. Cobb and Cleveland interrupt, as they are tasked to send him home. Larson is happy to go, but worried about Bolivar. At the airport, he escapes to save Bolivar, who is being held by El Toro for information. Just as Juan is about to kill her, Larson appears, armed.

Larson convinces Juan to fight El Toro and free Bolivar. However, they are defeated, and El Toro takes her in his helicopter. Larson jumps onboard and, after a brief struggle, kills El Toro, who remarks that he always knew he was the Ghost. Larson and Bolivar jump off the helicopter into water. They are cornered by General Ruiz, who plans to take over the country. Before Ruiz can kill them, he is shot by Amos (the real Ghost), who disappears.

Six months later, Juan is the president of Venezuela, with Bolivar watching. Cobb and Cleveland remark that he will be hard to control and that they hate the Ghost. Larson is again a bestselling author, after releasing his latest, which includes some of his Venezuelan adventures. Asked if the book is true in another TV interview with Katie Couric, Larson says it is a work of fiction.

== Cast ==
- Kevin James as Sam Larson/Mason Carver
- Kim Coates as President Miguel "Mike" Cueto
- Maurice Compte as Juan
- Zulay Henao as Rosa Bolivar
- Andrew Howard as Anton Masovich
- Ron Rifkin as Amos
- Yul Vazquez as General Javier Ruiz
- P. J. Byrne as Trent
- Kelen Coleman as Kylie Applebaum
- Leonard Earl Howze as Michael Cleveland
- Rob Riggle as William Cobb
- Andy García as El Toro

In addition, Katie Couric makes a cameo appearance as herself.

== Production ==
The film's script, titled The True Memoirs of an International Assassin, written by Jeff Morris, appeared on the 2009 Black List of best un-produced screenplays. The story revolves around an accountant and author, Joe, who is mistaken for an assassin when his fictional novel The Memoirs of an International Assassin is accidentally published as nonfiction under the title The True Memoirs of an International Assassin. On May 6, 2015, Kevin James was cast in the film to play the lead role. Jeff Wadlow was hired to re-write and direct the film, which Merced Media would finance, while PalmStar and Global Film Group would produce. Todd Garner and Kevin Frakes would also produce the film along with Raja Collins and Justin Begnaud, and Merced's Raj Brinder Singh. On May 19, 2015, it was announced that Netflix had bought the worldwide distribution rights to the comedy-drama film at the 68th Cannes Film Festival.

On October 20, 2015, Genesis Rodriguez signed on to play the female lead role as an undercover DEA agent. On November 12, 2015, Andy Garcia joined the film to play El Toro, a Venezuelan revolutionary leader.

On November 23, 2015, Rodriguez left the project due to injuries incurred during the film rehearsals; she stated on her Instagram that "it is with huge disappointment that I have to announce I got injured during rehearsals of True Memoirs and I can no longer continue". Following her leave, on the same day Variety reported that Zulay Henao had signed on to play the female lead as a DEA agent who blows her cover to help rescue Joe from the drug lords. On December 7, 2015, Kim Coates joined the film, and additional cast was announced in February 2016, which included Maurice Compte, Kelen Coleman, Andrew Howard, Rob Riggle, Leonard Earl Howze, and Yul Vazquez.

=== Filming ===
Principal photography on the film began on November 16, 2015, in Atlanta and then moved to the Dominican Republic, where it wrapped on February 12, 2016. The crew included cinematographer Peter Lyons Collister, production designer Toby Corbett, costume designer Lizz Wolf, and film editor Sean Albertson.

== Release ==
The film was released on Netflix on November 11, 2016.

=== Critical response ===
On the review aggregator website Rotten Tomatoes, 0% of 9 critics' reviews are positive, with an average rating of 3.8/10. Metacritic, which uses a weighted average, assigned the film a score of 37 out of 100, based on 6 critics, indicating "generally unfavorable" reviews.
