= Fighting (2009 film) =

2009 sports action drama film directed by Dito Montiel

- Theatrical release poster
- Directed by: Dito Montiel
- Written by: Robert Munic; Dito Montiel
- Produced by: Kevin Misher
- Starring: Channing Tatum; Terrence Howard; Luis Guzmán; Zulay Henao; Brian White
- Cinematography: Stefan Czapsky
- Edited by: Jake Pushinsky; Saar Klein
- Music by: David Wittman; Jonathan Elias
- Production companies: Rogue Pictures; Misher Films
- Distributed by: Universal Pictures
- Release date: April 24, 2009
- Running time: 105 minutes
- Country: United States
- Language: English
- Budget: $25 million
- Box office: $32.4 million

Fighting is a 2009 American sports action film directed by Dito Montiel, with a screenplay by Robert Munic and Montiel, and starring Channing Tatum, Terrence Howard and Luis Guzmán. It was released on April 24, 2009 in the United States by Rogue Pictures.

== Plot ==
Present day New York City: Shawn MacArthur (Channing Tatum) is a street hustler. One day while selling counterfeit goods at the corner of Radio City Music Hall, a group of young men attempt to force Shawn to relocate with his merchandise. These boys work for Harvey Boarden (Terrence Howard), a ticket scalper who controls the corner. Shawn fights them off, but does not retain his money or products.

Later, Shawn sees Harvey and the men who stole his money in a cafe and confronts them. Harvey gives him his money back and offers him a chance to a 'winner takes all' fight for money. Harvey sets up a meeting with his friend and rival, Martinez (Luis Guzmán). Shawn's first fight is at a Brooklyn church against a Russian. He wins when he knocks the Russian into a water fountain. Harvey takes Shawn to a club where he meets a waitress named Zulay (Zulay Henao), a single mother to whom Shawn had earlier tried to sell a fake Chinese Harry Potter book. In the VIP area to the club, Shawn also meets Evan Hailey (Brian White), a professional fighter who used to be on the same college team as Shawn, and was coached by Shawn's father. Shawn and Harvey leave after Evan and Shawn nearly get into a fight. Shawn's second fight is at the back of a store in the Bronx, against a much larger opponent. The fight descends into chaos after interference from some of Harvey's crew when the opponent nearly chokes Shawn, and the woman who owns the store pulls out a gun because one of the guys spills her drink. Harvey, Shawn, and the rest of Harvey's crew flee the scene and neither fighter gets paid. For his third fight, Shawn and the crew go to an Asian owned penthouse. Shawn wins the third fight.

Between fights, Shawn meets Zulay a few times, before they eventually have sex. Shawn and Zulay are visited by Harvey and Shawn is furious, suspecting Zulay and Harvey of having sexual relations. Harvey explains that Zulay places bets for him. Shawn and Harvey are offered a fight against Evan, and Shawn accepts, but Harvey wants him to throw the fight so that Martinez and his associates can make money. Shawn agrees to throw the fight. Zulay places the bets, a total of $500,000. Shawn and Evan fight, with Zulay, Harvey, and the rest of the crew watching. Evan has Shawn in a choke hold and it appears that Shawn is about to throw the fight; however, he fights back and overpowers Evan. Shawn beats Evan and Martinez threatens Harvey. At Harvey's apartment, Shawn reveals Zulay reversed the bets and they have one million dollars. Zulay picks up Shawn and Harvey and they leave New York with Zulay's daughter and grandmother.

== Cast ==
- Channing Tatum as Shawn MacArthur
- Terrence Howard as Harvey Boarden
- Luis Guzmán as Martinez
- Brian White as Evan Hailey
- Flaco Navaja as Javon Wilkinson / Ray Ray
- Cung Le as Dragon Lee
- Zulay Henao as Zulay Velez
- Roger Guenveur Smith as Jack Dancing
- Anthony DeSando as Christopher Anthony
- Danny Mastrogiorgio as Trader Jim
- Peter Tambakis as Z
- Michael Rivera as Ajax
- Dante Nero as Kimo

== Production ==
Shooting locations

- DeKalb Avenue/Washington Park, Fort Greene in Brooklyn, New York City.
- Nassau Street in Manhattan, New York City.
- Ramon Aponte Park, W. 47th Street, New York City.

== Release ==
=== Box office and critical reaction ===
The film opened at #3 at the North American box office making $11 million USD in its opening weekend.

On the review aggregator website Rotten Tomatoes, 40% of 129 critics' reviews are positive, with an average rating of 4.9/10. The website's consensus reads: "Though Fighting has a likable lead performer, and the fight scenes are impressive, the paper-thin plot ultimately unravels." Metacritic, which uses a weighted average, assigned the film a score of 61 out of 100, based on 22 critics, indicating "generally favorable" reviews.

=== Home media ===
Fighting was released on DVD and Blu-ray on August 25, 2009 in North America. The film has shifted over 600,000 copies as reported by www.the-numbers.com. The DVD and Blu-ray includes the theatrical version (105 minutes) and the unrated extended cut (108 minutes). Special features include deleted scenes and previews.
