= Malik Elassal =

Canadian comedian and actor

- Born: Winnipeg, Manitoba, Canada
- Occupations: Comedian, actor
- Years active: 2010s–present

Malik Elassal (Arabic: مالك العسال) is a Canadian stand-up comedian and actor best known for playing Samir in the FX comedy series Adults.

== Early life and education ==
Elassal was born in Winnipeg to Lebanese parents who moved to Canada in the early 1990s and worked at a garment factory. Shortly after his birth, the family relocated to northeast Calgary, where he was raised in a Muslim household.

Elassal graduated from Calgary Islamic School in 2014. He later dropped out of college twice. His parents were initially wary of Elassal's pursuing a “competitive and less-than-stable” career in entertainment but eventually came around.

== Career ==
After graduating from the Calgary Islamic School, Elassal attended a developmental night at Yuk Yuk’s.

In 2022, he was named one of the New Faces of Comedy at the Just for Laughs festival in Montreal. He recorded the title track on Yeehaw Hell Yeah, a comedy album released by Just For Laughs. He appeared on season 3 of The New Wave of Standup on CBC Gem in 2023.

Elassal was featured on the Vulture list of "Comedians You Should and Will Know" in 2024. He has had television roles in Resident Alien (2022), Joe Pickett (2021), Fortunate Son (2020) and Fakeland (2016). He was an extra in the film Interstellar (2014). He portrayed Marcus in Brett Goldstein and Jennifer Lopez romantic-comedy Office Romance (2026).

Elassal portrays Samir in FX comedy series Adults, created by The Tonight Show writers Ben Kronengold and Rebecca Shaw and executive produced by Nick Kroll, about five housemates in Queens, New York.

== Selected filmography ==
Year	Title	Role	Notes
2016	Fakeland	Paul Macleary	Episode: "Pilot"
2020	Fortunate Son	Local #1	Episode: "Fortunate Son"
2021	Joe Pickett	Calvin Mendes	3 episodes
2022	Resident Alien	Straw Hat Man	Episode: "An Alien in New York"
2025–present	Adults	Samir	Main role
2026	Office Romance	Marcus	Mail clerk
