= Boy Wonder (film) =

2010 film

- Directed by: Michael Morrissey
- Written by: Michael Morrissey
- Produced by: John Scacia; Michael Morrissey
- Starring: Caleb Steinmeyer; Zulay Henao; Bill Sage; Daniel Stewart Sherman; Tracy Middendorf; Chuck Cooper; James Russo
- Cinematography: Chris LaVasseur
- Edited by: Ray Hubley; Doug Fitch
- Music by: Irv Johnson
- Production company: Boy Wonder Productions
- Distributed by: Lightning Entertainment
- Release date: August 2010 (Rhode Island Film Festival)
- Running time: 93 minutes
- Country: United States
- Language: English

Boy Wonder is a 2010 American psychological thriller about vigilantism. The film was written and directed by Michael Morrissey and stars Caleb Steinmeyer, Zulay Henao, Bill Sage, Tracy Middendorf, Daniel Stewart Sherman, Chuck Cooper, and James Russo.

== Plot ==
Eight-year-old Sean Donovan watches helplessly when his parents are attacked in a carjacking attempt. Sean's father, Terry, is knocked unconscious and his mother is murdered. Afterward, Terry moves them to a nicer neighborhood.

Ten years later, Sean is an excellent student but is antisocial and distant from his peers; he instead spends time with law enforcement officers volunteering at the local precinct where he covertly investigates his mother's murder. He trains in self-defense skills and begins carrying several weapons at night, including batons, brass knuckles, and knives. After reading about the death of a young boy in a neighborhood park, Sean uses himself as bait to lure the suspected perpetrator into mugging him. Sean kills the suspect with a gun as revenge for the young boy, sustaining minor injuries before viciously retaliating. An eyewitness statement draws the interest of Teresa Ames, who has recently been promoted to the NYPD homicide division and does not believe it is a clear-cut case of self defense.

Sean witnesses a young prostitute being abused by her pimp where it is clear that she is being forced to participate. He fights with the pimp, who is armed with a metal baseball bat; Sean shoots and kills him before rescuing the prostitute. Teresa once again finds disturbing evidence of a pattern, but the prostitute refuses to testify, believing that the event rescued her. Later, Teresa befriends Sean at the precinct and learns about his life, including his interest in a toxin named Tricelaron. He insists it was part of his research for a chemistry paper. She also finds that he speaks fluent Chinese after he angrily berates rude staff in a Chinese restaurant.

While riding the train, Sean intervenes when a drunk passenger begins verbally threatening a Chinese family, insulting them with the word "Pig" by imitating pig squeals without reason, insulting other people without reason with the same insults, in particular an African American woman and a man who intervenes. Sean tells the family to leave the car in Chinese before applying black face paint and confronting the man who further provokes Sean. Sean brutally beats the man with the brass knuckles in the violent altercation and everyone flees the train car; however, the man is bleeding and he begs Sean to spare him. Sean refuses his pleas because of the insults he uttered and kills him by savagely beating him to death. The Chinese family alerts 2 police officers who are on the train and happen to be Teresa and her partner. They investigate the scene but Sean gets away without being identified.

In the crime scene of the train station, Teresa's partner questions the Chinese family, and Teresa learns that the perpetrator spoke fluent Chinese, and suspects it to be Sean. Digging deeper, she learns that Sean was able to clearly identify his mother's murderer from a photo book, but his father Terry convinced him to change his story. The murderer is identified as Larry Childs, a contract killer, whom Teresa arrested six months ago, but has just managed to get a two-year sentence, and entry into the witness protection program through a plea bargain.

During a school party, Sean has a violent flashback of his mother's murder and recalls hearing the killer call his father by his old boxing nickname. Enraged by the memory, he savagely beats with a metal bar a fellow student who has been harassing a female friend. Teresa, while investigating Sean, finds a picture at his house of Terry and the murderer Larry together and realizes that they knew each other before the attack.

Sean believes that Terry staged the attack to obtain his wife's life insurance to pay off his debts. Sean confronts his father, but Terry adamantly denies involvement. Convinced of his father's guilt after realizing that his father prevented him from identifying the culprit from the beginning, Sean shoots and kills Terry. Teresa finds Sean, but he says someone broke into their home and killed his father. Teresa sees the murder weapon and disposes of it. She releases Sean as a suspect of the murder of the drunk passenger in the train, because she realizes the drunk was an offender, by insulting morality against on the people in the train.

Sometime later, Sean sends a letter to Larry, who is currently serving his two-year sentence. In the letter Sean expresses his forgiveness to Larry but pleads with him to reveal the truth of his mother's murder: was his father involved? He offers a simple way to reply and includes a self-addressed, empty envelope, a red stamp, and a black stamp. He asks Larry to use the black stamp if his father is guilty or the red stamp if his father is innocent. Larry licks the stamp and after handing it to a guard, falls to the floor of his jail cell, unable to breathe. Sean has laced the stamp glue with Tricelaron and Larry dies. When Sean receives the letter, he stares at the red stamp it bears, knowing fully well that Larry would never give him the truth.

== Cast ==
- Caleb Steinmeyer as Sean Donovan
- Zulay Henao as Teresa Ames
- James Russo as Larry Childs
- Bill Sage as Terry Donovan
- Tracy Middendorf as Mary Donovan
- Chuck Cooper as Bill Baldwin

== Production ==
Cinematographer Chris LaVasseur used a RED One camera to shoot the film. He used the digital intermediate process to tweak the colors according to director Michael Morrissey's desires. Morrissey, who had never worked with a RED One camera before, was initially skeptical, as he found the colors to be too saturated. LaVasseur was able to demonstrate to him that this could be easily corrected. Filming took place in Canarsie, Brooklyn, New York.

== Release ==
Boy Wonder premiered at the Rhode Island Film Festival. It was released on DVD in the United States on November 8, 2011.

== Reception ==
Review aggregator Rotten Tomatoes reports an approval rating of 50% based on 6 reviews from critics; the average rating is 6.4/10. Ronnie Scheib of Variety wrote, "Morrissey displays a flair for moody atmospherics as his protagonist wanders Gotham's streets and subways at night, but the film relies too heavily on cryptic flashbacks and deliberate gaps in the narrative to create suspense, revealing rather than fleshing out connective tissue." Kirk Honeycutt of The Hollywood Reporter described it as an intriguing and smart exploration of vigilantism that could become a cult film. Roger Ebert of the Chicago Sun-Times rated it 3.5/4 stars and wrote, "In a genre populated with formulas and dreck, Boy Wonder is an ambitious exception, well-made, drawing us in." Jeannette Catsoulis of The New York Times wrote, "Despite its aura of rebellious cool, Boy Wonder is as frigid and empty as Sean's vengeful heart." J. R. Jones of the Chicago Reader wrote, "Visually and rhetorically, this is indistinguishable from a network cop show."
