= Zulay Henao =

American actress (born 1979)

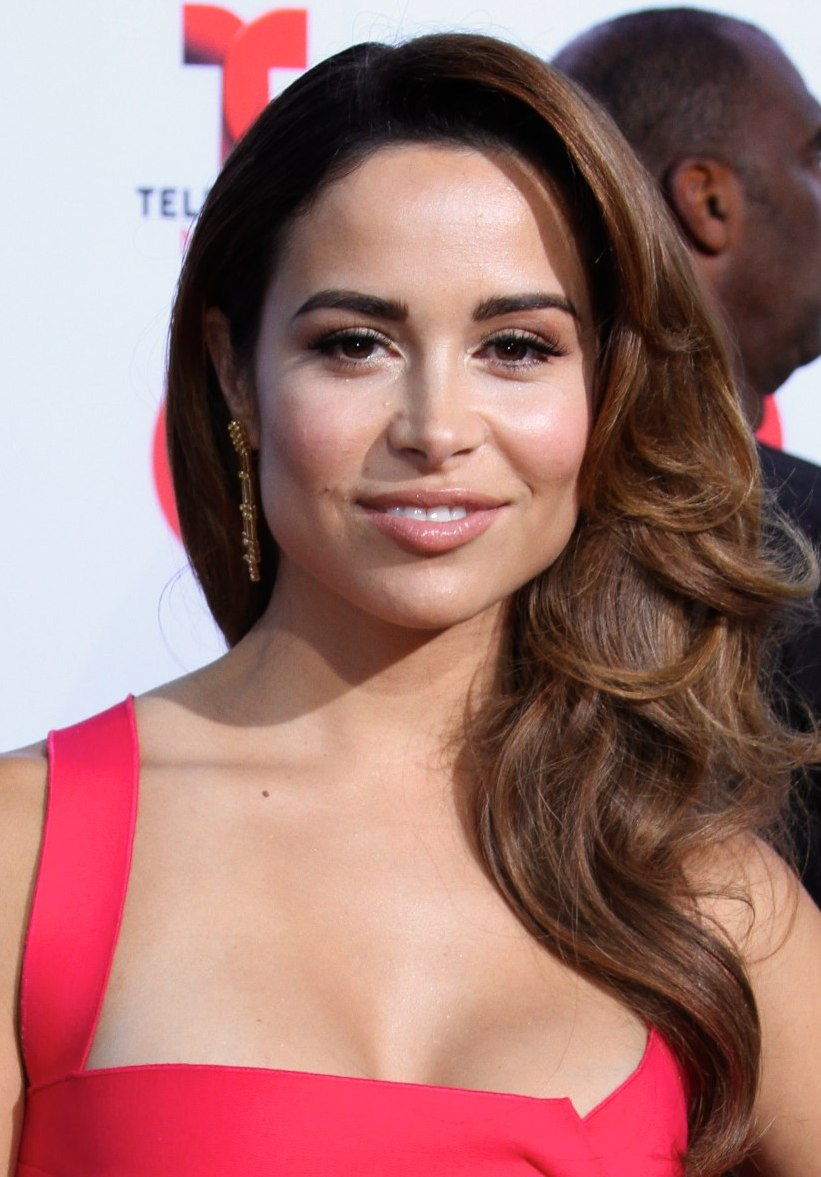
- Henao at the 2013 Alma Awards
- Born: March 22, 1979 (age 47); Medellín, Antioquia, Colombia
- Education: New York Conservatory for Dramatic Arts
- Occupations: Actress, model
- Years active: 2005–present
- Partner: Kevin Connolly (2019–present)
- Children: 1
- Military career
- Allegiance: United States
- Branch: United States Army
- Service years: 1997–2000

Zulay Henao (born March 22, 1979) is an American film and television actress. Since first appearing in the 2005 independent production Film 101, she has appeared in numerous films and single episodes of television series, as well as appearing as a series regular in Love Thy Neighbor (2013), If Loving You Is Wrong (2014–2020), and a recurring role in The Oath (2019).

== Early life ==
Henao was born in Medellín, Antioquia, Colombia. She and her family emigrated to New Jersey. After high school she served three years with the U.S. Army. After the service, Henao enrolled at the New York Conservatory for Dramatic Arts to study acting.

== Career ==
Henao appeared in two small films, and in 2007 made her television debut in an episode of Lifetime drama series, Army Wives. In the same year she also guest-starred on Law & Order: Special Victims Unit. Also in 2007, Henao had supporting roles in films Illegal Tender and Feel the Noise. In 2008 she starred in the horror film Grizzly Park, and appeared opposite Charles S. Dutton in a Lifetime Original Movie Racing for Time.

In 2009, Henao had the female lead role in the sports film Fighting alongside Channing Tatum, and also appeared in the science fiction film S. Darko. In 2011 she starred in the independent psychological-thriller film, Boy Wonder. Henao also has appeared in Takers (2010) and Hostel: Part III (2011).

In 2013, Henao began starring as regular on the Oprah Winfrey Network sitcom, Love Thy Neighbor. She left the show after a single season. Henao starred opposite Nia Long, Wendi McLendon-Covey, and Amy Smart in the 2014 film The Single Moms Club, directed by Tyler Perry. She later was cast in same role of television adaptation of film, called If Loving You Is Wrong. Also in 2014, Henao was cast as adult film legend Vanessa del Rio, in an untitled biopic directed by Thomas Mignone. She later left the project and was replaced by Vivian Lamolli. In 2019, she had a recurring roles in The Oath and Stumptown.

== Personal life ==
Henao is in a relationship with Kevin Connolly. The couple are parents to daughter Kennedy Cruz, born in June 2021.

== Filmography ==
Year	Title	Role	Notes
2005	Film 101	Unknown Role	
2005	Clearview	Gloria Rojas	
2007	Illegal Tender	Mora	
2007	Feel the Noise	Carol "CC" Reyes	
2007	Saturday Morning	Unknown Role	
2008	The Heart Is a Hidden Camera	Natasha	Short film
2008	Grizzly Park	Lola	
2009	Fighting	Zulay Velez	
2009	S. Darko	Baelyn	Direct-to-video
2009	The Magnificent Cooly-T	Angie	
2010	Takers	Monica Hatcher	
2011	Boy Wonder	Teresa Ames	
2011	Havana Heat	Agent Brianna Evans	
2011	Hostel: Part III	Nikki	
2014	White Space	Lynn Navarro	
2014	The Single Moms Club	Esperanza	
2015	Destined	Giselle Porter	
2016	True Memoirs of an International Assassin	Rosa Bolivar	
2016	Meet the Blacks	Lorena Black	
2017	Grow House	Madison	
2018	Beyond White Space	Lynn Navarro	
2019	Grand Isle	Detective Newton	
2021	The House Next Door: Meet the Blacks 2	Lorena	

=== Television ===
Year	Title	Role	Notes
2007	Army Wives	Delores Marino	Episode: "Only the Lonely"
2007	Law & Order: Special Victims Unit	Forensics Tech Casanueva	Episode: "Svengali"
2008	Fear Itself	Christie	Episode: "New Year's Day"
2008	Racing for Time	Carmen	TV movie
2009	The Unusuals	Rosa Trumble	Episode: "Crime Slut"
2013	Love Thy Neighbor	Marianna Perez	Series regular, 13 episodes
2014–2020	If Loving You Is Wrong	Esperanza	Series regular
2017	MacGyver	Cynthia	Episode: "Large Blade"
2018	Kevin Can Wait	Rebecca Romero	Episode: "Kevin Can Date"
2019	The Oath	Carmen Velasquez	Recurring role, 8 episodes
2019	Star	Lucia	Episodes: "Watch the Throne" and "The Reckoning"
2019	Stumptown	Denise	Episodes: "Missed Connections" and "Family Ties"
