= Andre Hall =

Andre Hall may refer to:

- Andre Hall (American football)
- Andre Hall (actor)
