= Paint (2023 film) =

American film by Brit McAdams

- Theatrical release poster
- Directed by: Brit McAdams
- Written by: Brit McAdams
- Produced by: Sam Maydew; Peter Brant
- Starring: Owen Wilson; Michaela Watkins; Ciara Renée; Stephen Root; Wendi McLendon-Covey; Lucy Freyer; Lusia Strus; Michael Pemberton
- Cinematography: Patrick Cady
- Edited by: Sofi Marshall
- Music by: Lyle Workman
- Production companies: White Birch Films; Silver Lining Entertainment; Blue Creek Pictures
- Distributed by: IFC Films
- Release date: April 7, 2023
- Running time: 96 minutes
- Country: United States
- Language: English
- Box office: $811,739

Paint is a 2023 American comedy-drama film written and directed by Brit McAdams. The film stars Owen Wilson, Michaela Watkins, Ciara Renée, Stephen Root, Wendi McLendon-Covey, Lucy Freyer, Lusia Strus, and Michael Pemberton.

Paint was released in the United States on April 7, 2023, by IFC Films.

== Plot ==
Carl Nargle, a perm-haired, soft-spoken host of a top-rated public television painting show, finds himself challenged when his host station in Vermont hires Ambrosia, a younger painter who has more skill and versatility than Carl, in hopes of improving the station's overall struggles.

Ambrosia quickly usurps Carl's time slot, taking away his ability to seduce his co-workers. The station manager fires Carl after an embarrassing fundraiser and gets him a job teaching painting classes at a nearby college, but he is too depressed to teach. The true love of his life, Katherine, comes to his aid when realizing that she has wasted her life waiting for his approval and Carl decides that he has been a foolish and vain playboy. The two confess their love to one another as Carl's barn accidentally burns down, leaving the town to believe that he is dead, when in reality, he is living a simple life with Katherine.

== Cast ==
- Owen Wilson as Carl Nargle
- Michaela Watkins as Katherine
- Wendi McLendon-Covey as Wendy
- Ciara Renée as Ambrosia
- Lucy Freyer as Jenna
- Lusia Strus as Beverly
- Stephen Root as Tony
- Michael Pemberton as Dr. Bradford Lenihan
- Denny Dillon as PBS host
- Evander Duck Jr. as Reuban
- Ryan Czerwonko as young bar regular

== Production ==
The film took 13 years to make. In 2010, the screenplay Paint, written by Brit McAdams, was featured on the Black List of that year's most-liked unproduced screenplays. On April 16, 2021, it was announced that Owen Wilson, Michaela Watkins, Wendi McLendon-Covey, Ciara Renée, Lusia Strus, and Stephen Root had signed on to star in the film, which McAdams would also direct. In May 2021, it was announced that Lucy Freyer would also star.

Principal photography took place from April 2021 to June 2021 in Albany, New York.

== Release ==
Paint was originally set to be released by IFC Films on April 28, 2023, but was moved to April 7, 2023. The film streamed exclusively on AMC+ in the United States later in 2023.

The film was released digitally on May 9, with a Blu-ray and DVD release to follow on July 25.

== Reception ==
=== Box office ===
Paint made $293,000 from 819 theaters on its first day, and a total of $570,512 in its opening weekend, finishing in ninth.

=== Critical response ===
On the review aggregator website Rotten Tomatoes, 32% of 104 critics' reviews are positive, with an average rating of 5.1/10. The website's consensus reads: "Thanks to a creative canvas that's stretched too thin and haphazardly splashed with far too few colors, most viewers will find watching Paint a painfully dry experience." Metacritic, which uses a weighted average, assigned the film a score of 45 out of 100, based on 29 critics, indicating "mixed or average" reviews. Audiences surveyed by PostTrak gave it an 83% positive score, with 33% saying they would definitely recommend it.
