= List of Love Thy Neighbor (American TV series) episodes =

Love Thy Neighbor is an American sitcom television series on the Oprah Winfrey Network that debuted on May 29, 2013 at 9/8c. Love Thy Neighbor is a half-hour sitcom revolving around diner owner Hattie Mae Love and her middle-class family's daily triumphs and struggles. The focal point of the show is a location known as the Love Train Diner, an old locomotive car converted to a diner that serves up all of Hattie Mae's old recipes. It is the neighborhood hang out spot that, along with great food, serves up a lot of fun and offers advice to its customers in all walks of life. The series is written, directed and produced by Tyler Perry.

== Series overview ==
Season	Episodes	Originally released	
Season	Episodes	First released	Last released
1	26	May 29, 2013	August 21, 2013
2	26	January 8, 2014	September 10, 2014
3	22	January 7, 2015	July 31, 2015
4	22	January 8, 2016	September 2, 2016
5	22	March 4, 2017	August 19, 2017

== Episodes ==
=== Season 1 (2013) ===
No. overall	No. in season	Title	Original release date	US viewers (millions)
1	1	"What's Love Got To Do With It"	May 29, 2013	1.65
Hattie, owner of the Love Train Diner, has become fed-up with her grandson Danny leeching off of her. With his new college degree, he is able to successfully receive a position at his friends' Sam and Drew's workplace; Uncle Floyd discovers Linda's husband out with another woman.
2	2	"Love Thy Independence"	May 29, 2013	1.79
After receiving word about her cheating husband, Linda goes into a depressed state and finds comfort staying at her mother's home. With no money in the bank and bills adding up, Linda contemplates talking with her husband and solving the problems in their relationship, despite mama Hattie not agreeing with the plan. Danny is able to save up enough money to move out of his mother's home and he moves into Sam's apartment.
3	3	"Love Thy Privacy"	June 5, 2013	1.10
Sam learns that Linda has received a key from Danny to the "bachelor pad", and he demands that he get it back from her after she walks in on him while he is nude.
4	4	"Love Ain't Opening This Door"	June 5, 2013	1.23
Linda copes with her son after her divorce is finalized while Sam has a problem with Danny's mother visiting too often.
5	5	"Where's My Mamma"	June 12, 2013	1.05
Hattie uses love as a tactic to have Linda defend herself. Meanwhile, Linda asks to stay at Floyd's apartment after Hattie kicks her out.
6	6	"Love Thy Journey"	June 12, 2013	1.19
At the diner, the health inspector comes in for an unannounced visit and Linda starts her first day working. Floyd and Linda frantically work to bring the diner up to code.
7	7	"Love Thy Vindication"	June 19, 2013	0.99
When a fire at Vivian's diner is deemed arson, everyone points their fingers at Hattie as the culprit. Later, a fire marshal comes into the diner to reveal the cause.
8	8	"Love Thy Partnership"	June 19, 2013	1.09
Hattie ponders the idea of creating a strategic business deal with Vivian after sales are slow at the diner. Meanwhile Sam, Drew & Danny argue over who will receive a promotion at work.
9	9	"Don’t Mess with That White Lightning"	June 26, 2013	0.93
Danny has reached a limit with Sam's overbearing party habit. Hattie hears of the news and decides to fix things herself to prevent Danny from moving back in with her. She attends a party at Sam's and serves him a beverage called "White Lightning". In the morning, Sam wakes up and finds himself handcuffed to Hattie.
10	10	"Love Thy Celibacy"	June 26, 2013	1.00
Confusion ensues when Hattie misunderstands Linda during a conversation about celibacy; Danny fears that his mother may be prostituting herself.
11	11	"The Black Tie Affair"	July 3, 2013	0.83
After Marty invites Linda to the Mayor's Ball, Danny worries they may be getting too close, so he teams up with Sam and Floyd to try to get Marty out of the picture.
12	12	"Love Thy Compromise"	July 3, 2013	0.80
As payback for Sam's constant partying, Danny decides to withhold his half of the rent.
13	13	"Love That Bracelet"	July 10, 2013	1.01
Sam has finally toned down on the partying, but continues to be loose with women. Danny and Drew play a crude trick on him to teach him a lesson, by making him think that he killed his latest hookup, Heather.
14	14	"Love Thy Boss"	July 10, 2013	1.05
Sam clashes with the new boss at Beagal and Steve, Marianna. Danny and Sam corner Drew into inviting Marianna to live with her, even though she doesn't like her.
15	15	"Love Thy Doctor"	July 17, 2013	0.99
After her annual checkup at the hospital and after overhearing the others about Vivian's horse, Hattie believes she might be dying.
16	16	"Love Thy Baby"	July 17, 2013	1.04
Hattie is shocked to discover a deserted baby in the restaurant bathroom after Marianna has a shelter dinner at The Love Train Diner.
17	17	"Love Thy Patient"	July 24, 2013	0.84
Hattie falls while working late one night at the diner and feigns serious injury to gain sympathy and unnecessary assistance.
18	18	"Love Thy Surprise"	July 24, 2013	0.96
When Linda throws Hattie a surprise birthday party, she gets a very unexpected reaction from her mother.
19	19	"My First Love"	July 31, 2013	0.74
Linda is shocked to discover that her old flame from high school, Carl is now very rich.
20	20	"Love Thy Wager"	July 31, 2013	0.83
Danny bets Sam that he can't endure staying in the apartment for a full weekend.
21	21	"Love Thy Mortality"	August 7, 2013	0.76
After attending a funeral, Sam finally decides to make a change in his life.
22	22	"Love Thy Self"	August 7, 2013	0.82
Drew tries to keep her date away from Marianna, believing she might steal him from her.
23	23	"Love Thy Youth"	August 14, 2013	0.81
Danny decides to spend time with people his own age since he spends too much time with his mother.
24	24	"Love Thy Children"	August 14, 2013	0.88
Danny and Sam become mentors for two troubled kids. Floyd is robbed just outside the diner.
25	25	"Love Thy Courage"	August 21, 2013	0.89
After being accused of infidelity, Danny fears for his safety.
26	26	"Love Thy Family"	August 21, 2013	1.04
Family and friends gather at Hattie's during a storm.

=== Season 1 PT2 (2013) ===
No. overall	No. in season	Title	Original release date	US viewers (millions)
Part 1
27	1	"Take Your Pick"	January 8, 2014	N/A
Hattie and Drew make Linda an online dating profile
28	2	"The Internet Suitor"	January 8, 2014	N/A
Linda meets a man she met online.
29	3	"The Predator"	January 15, 2014	N/A
There's bad news about Linda's new boyfriend
30	4	"An Unfortunate Circumstance"	January 22, 2014	N/A
Will ends up not being as bad as everyone thought.
31	5	"Duped — Part 1"	January 29, 2014	N/A
Linda looks for a new apartment; Will helps.
32	6	"Duped — Part 2"	February 5, 2014	N/A
Linda is dismissive when the others tell her that Will has tricked her.
33	7	"Linda to the Rescue"	February 12, 2014	N/A
Linda helps a young woman grow up.
34	8	"Fair to Middlin"	February 19, 2014	N/A
Hattie helps a heartbroken Linda by pushing her to go to work.
35	9	"Missed Calls"	February 26, 2014	N/A
When Will visits at the diner, Linda confronts him after she's been scammed out of $3,000.
36	`10	"Danny Meets Philip"	March 5, 2014	N/A
Linda makes plans with Philip and Will, but she cancels her plans with Philip.
37	11	"Permission Granted"	March 12, 2014	N/A
Philip goes to Danny and asks if he can date his mother.
38	12	"I Don't See You That Way"	March 19, 2014	N/A
Philip treats Linda to a romantic dinner.
39	13	"The Kiss"	March 26, 2014	N/A
Phillip admits his feelings for Linda and the two share a romantic kiss with each other.
40	14	"Love Thy Kiss"	April 2, 2014	N/A
Linda is troubled by the kiss she shared with Philip and Will overhears.
Part 2
41	15	"Love Thy Condiments"	June 25, 2014	N/A
Danny swears off condiments; Hattie mishears him.
42	16	"Will and Philip"	July 2, 2014	N/A
Philip's playing cards with the group; Linda's surprised when Will also shows up at the house.
43	17	"Love Thy Competition"	July 9, 2014	N/A
Linda and Phillip are caught with their tongues tied; Will breaks up with Linda.
44	18	"A Tornado Named Linda"	July 16, 2014	N/A
Linda doesn't react well after Will dumps her.
45	19	"Lucky Socks"	July 23, 2014	N/A
Danny, Floyd, Sam, and Drew have been temporarily evicted; Danny asks Hattie if they can crash with her.
46	20	"The Make-Up"	July 30, 2014	N/A
Philip moves on.; Will apologizes to Linda.
47	21	"Gotcha — Part 1"	August 6, 2014	N/A
Danny thinks that he already knows a potential client and that she is the same woman that tricked his mother out of $3,000.
48	22	"Gotcha — Part 2"	August 13, 2014	N/A
After realizing that Will duped her, Linda is heartbroken.
49	23	"Make Love To Me"	August 20, 2014	N/A
Linda goes back to Philip and indulges in a spontaneous night of passion.
50	24	"A Night Away"	August 27, 2014	N/A
Linda's inhibitions return upon her waking; she is shocked and upset when she realizes she's in Philip's bed.
51	25	"Did Philip Get Away"	September 3, 2014	N/A
Philip is in a new relationship; Linda has just found out which raises her suspicions.
52	26	"Morning Sickness"	September 10, 2014	N/A
Linda finds out she is pregnant with Phillip being the father.

=== Season 2 (2015) ===
No. overall	No. in season	Title	Original release date	US viewers (millions)
Part 1
53	1	"Sarah"	January 7, 2015	1.08
Upon a visit to the Love Train Diner, Sarah exposes her relationship with Philip.
54	2	"Linda's Hormones"	January 14, 2015	0.72
In the midst of experiencing pregnancy hormones, Linda decides to tell Phillip about the baby.
55	3	"Madea's Pressure Is Up"	January 21, 2015	0.92
With Madea's help, Hattie confronts Phillip; the subject is Linda's pregnancy.
56	4	"Madea & Hattie"	January 28, 2015	1.03
Madea and Hattie find out about Linda's pregnancy; things don't bode well for Phillip.
57	5	"When She Was A Little Girl"	February 4, 2015	0.91
In an effort to make Philip feel guilty, Hattie shows him a letter Linda wrote when she was younger.
58	6	"Linda's Silence"	February 11, 2015	0.77
In a sudden change of heart, Philip has decided he wants to marry Linda; he tells Danny and Hattie.
59	7	"Don't Feel Pressured"	February 18, 2015	0.84
Linda can't handle the morning sickness any longer.
60	8	"The Ring - Part 1"	February 25, 2015	0.70
Philip panics when the engagement ring is missing; Floyd, Sam and Danny try to help him find it.
61	9	"The Ring - Part 2"	March 4, 2015	0.73
Philip doubts himself; Hattie convinces him to start over and give Linda the ring.
62	10	"Just the Way You Are"	March 11, 2015	0.75
Hattie throws a surprise party for Linda to make her feel more appreciated by everyone.
63	11	"Love for Linda"	March 18, 2015	0.60
Linda's son Danny tries to plan his mom a surprise baby shower. But Philip has other plans to surprise Linda and asks her to marry him by singing and playing the piano
Part 2
64	12	"Ella and Curtis"	June 26, 2015	0.58
Linda ask Ella Payne to help plan her wedding. Meanwhile, Curtis wants Floyd to pay him back for his investment in the diner. Note: This is considered a crossover between House of Payne and Love Thy Neighbor. Special Guest Stars: LaVan Davis as Curtis Payne and Cassi Davis as Ella Payne
65	13	"Drew's Feelings"	June 26, 2015	0.61
Drew reveals her love for Danny.
66	14	"Caroline and P.J."	July 3, 2015	0.57
Linda has to tell P.J. and Caroline that she's engaged to their father.
67	15	"Ronald and Maggie"	July 3, 2015	0.65
Linda meets Phillip's ex in-laws; her family comes along.
68	16	"Spring Cleaning"	July 10, 2015	0.73
Hattie prepares for spring cleaning at the diner; Linda explains why she can't move in with Phillip.
69	17	"An Empty Palate"	July 10, 2015	0.80
Linda threatens to call the wedding off if Philip does not change the furniture in his house.
70	18	"Love Thy Decorator"	July 17, 2015	0.61
Philip allows Linda to redecorate the house in whatever way she chooses.
71	19	"The Promotion"	July 17, 2015	0.65
After Hattie finds out that Danny got a promotion, she asks him to help pay for Linda's wedding
72	20	"I Got You Baby"	July 24, 2015	0.67
Linda asks Hattie if she'll stay and help her when the baby comes, because she doubts that Philip will help with the newborn.
73	21	"Troy"	July 24, 2015	0.71
Danny shows Drew's cousin around for the weekend, and falls for her fast.
74	22	"Vegas"	July 31, 2015	0.63
Troy and Danny inevitably do something stupid in Las Vegas. In the last minute Linda's water breaks while she is 6 months pregnant.

=== Season 3 (2016) ===
No. overall	No. in season	Title	Original release date	US viewers (millions)
Part 1
75	1	"A Mother's Heartbreak"	January 8, 2016	0.56
Heartbroken, Linda has to put up with Danny's impulsive decisions.
76	2	"Three's a Crowd"	January 8, 2016	0.66
Troy and Sam zero in on Danny.
77	3	"Enough of This"	January 15, 2016	0.61
Danny has to deal with how his friends and family feel about his wife.
78	4	"A Pregnant Wife"	January 15, 2016	0.68
Philip learns the basics of pregnancy.
79	5	"One Mama of a Nightmare"	January 22, 2016	0.73
Danny struggles with his mother's absence.
80	6	"Hattie Still Got It"	January 22, 2016	0.75
Hattie tries to force Linda and Troy to discuss their differences.
81	7	"Danny's Wife"	January 29, 2016	0.65
Sam has a difficult time accepting Danny's newfound responsibility as Troy's husband.
82	8	"A Fresh Bath"	January 29, 2016	0.70
Sam pushes Danny over the edge and causes him to make a dramatic change in his life.
83	9	"Hattie's Uncle"	February 5, 2016	0.60
Hattie has to once again face the consequences of not paying taxes.
84	10	"Why Hattie's Happy"	February 5, 2016	0.62
Linda finds out why Hattie's been unusually happy.
85	11	"Second Thoughts"	February 12, 2016	0.65
Troy discusses her marriage troubles with Hattie.
Part 2
86	12	"The Bus Station"	July 1, 2016	0.55
Thanks to Drew, there's a misunderstanding.
87	13	"Invasion of Privacy"	July 1, 2016	0.59
Sam violates Troy's personal space and continues to disrupt Danny's marriage.
88	14	"Who You Know"	July 8, 2016	0.51
Everyone joins in for a game of "Who You Know".
89	15	"Vernon"	July 15, 2016	0.52
An evening of passion takes a twisted turn; Hattie fears for her friend's life.
90	16	"D-Day"	July 22, 2016	0.53
Sam makes a risky decision that puts him in a tough situation.
91	17	"Scared"	July 29, 2016	N/A
Sam is compelled to reveal the true nature surrounding his lack of maturity.
92	18	"Hattie's Memoirs"	August 5, 2016	0.54
Hattie's decision to write hemoirs causes unrest amongst her family and friends.
93	19	"I Want My Mamma"	August 12, 2016	0.55
Linda reaches a point where the only one that can come to the rescue is her mother.
94	20	"Crying Wolf"	August 19, 2016	0.50
Linda receives a surprising phone call.
95	21	"Tired"	August 26, 2016	0.59
A heated discussion with Danny's family brings Troy to her limit.
96	22	"Done"	September 2, 2016	0.60
Danny can't take anymore of Sam's annoying behavior.

=== Season 4 (2017) ===
No. overall	No. in season	Title	Original release date	US viewers (millions)
Part 1
97	1	"Locked Out"	March 4, 2017	0.404
In the fifth and final season opener, Linda worries about Danny isolating himself in his apartment.
98	2	"Wine With Cereal"	March 4, 2017	0.419
Danny goes into a funk after Troy leaves him.
99	3	"No Respect For Danny"	March 11, 2017	0.457
Danny is angry with his family and friends because of how they have treated Troy.
100	4	"Digging The Hole Deeper"	March 11, 2017	0.487
Linda continues to exhibit her dislike for Troy as symptoms from her pregnancy worsen.
101	5	"Unanswered"	March 18, 2017	N/A
Danny's family tries to reach him during an emergency.
102	6	"She's Pretty"	March 18, 2017	N/A
Linda is in labor at the diner.
103	7	"Better Late Than Never"	March 25, 2017	N/A
A missed call leaves Danny and his family in a bad place.
104	8	"Make Up Or Make Out"	March 25, 2017	N/A
Still upset with his friends, Danny takes the advice of his family.
105	9	"Last Night"	April 1, 2017	N/A
Sam and Drew wake up in a precarious position.
106	10	"The Cure For Sweat"	April 8, 2017	N/A
Danny's cure for sweat causes Troy to suspect Danny is cheating.
107	11	"Danny's Absence"	April 8, 2017	N/A
Danny struggles with forgiveness.
Part 2
108	12	"My Two Favorite Girls"	July 29, 2017	N/A
Linda attempts to apologize to Danny and Troy.
109	13	"When A Father Sleeps"	July 29, 2017	N/A
Linda decides to let Philip take care of their baby alone.
110	14	"Father Knows Best"	July 29, 2017	N/A
Linda Tries to teach Philip a lesson, so Linda leaves Philip alone with their new baby.
111	15	"A Sweaty Proposition"	August 5, 2017	N/A
Troy and Danny deal with a personal hygiene problem in their marriage.
112	16	"It's Just Dinner"	August 5, 2017	N/A
Sam's confidence is shaken after he prepared dinner for Drew.
113	17	"Catching Sam"	August 5, 2017	N/A
Sam and Drew struggle to keep a secret.
114	18	"Number Five Sixty-Seven"	August 12, 2017	N/A
Danny confronts Sam and Drew about their relationship.
115	19	"The Same Old Sam"	August 12, 2017	N/A
Sam is convinced that he's in love with Drew, so Sam does the unthinkable.
116	20	"Candles And Flowers"	August 19, 2017	N/A
Sam's poorly misguided plan to win Drew's affection rebounds.
117	21	"One Day Soon"	August 19, 2017	N/A
Hattie, Troy, and Drew try to babysit Baby Celina.
118	22	"True Feelings"	August 19, 2017	N/A
In the series finale, Sam and Drew explain their feelings for each other.
