= Lusia Strus =

American writer and actor

- Люсія Струс
- Born: December 13, 1969 (age 56); Chicago, Illinois, U.S.
- Occupations: Actress, writer
- Years active: 1998–present

Lusia Rozalia Strus (Note: Ukrainian: Люсія Розалія Струс, romanized: Liusiia Rozaliia Strus) (born December 13, 1969) is an American writer and stage and film actress with Neo-Futurists.

== Childhood and work as a theater actress ==
Strus was born in Chicago, Illinois, to a Ukrainian family. She spoke Ukrainian as her first language and regularly attended Ukrainian school on weekends. She had first decisive successes at performing arts, while a high school student, and attended Illinois State University. As a theater major, she joined Greg Allen's Neo-Futurist ensemble, in 1993, which she wrote solo and ensemble performances for. She has played for the Chicago Steppenwolf, Goodman, and Victory Gardens theaters as well as for the Curious Theatre Company, the Northlight Repertory, and others, and has also worked for Yoplait, WBEZ, and the Chicago Jazz Festival.

== Film and TV actress ==
Strus is noted for her role as Adam Sandler's assistant (Alexa) in 50 First Dates, as well as for playing eclectic characters and sometimes incorporating unusual accents in her roles. Her career has spanned theatre and stage for nearly two decades. She had a recurring role on Nickelodeon's Ned's Declassified School Survival Guide as Dr. Xavier. Strus played Janine in Miss Congeniality 2: Armed and Fabulous, and plays Rachel in Jason Lew's and Gus Van Sant's Restless. She had a recurring role in Wayward Pines (2015), and played Letty's mother Estelle on Good Behavior from 2016 to 2018.

== Filmography ==
=== Film ===
Year	Title	Role	Notes
1996	Reflections from the Heart of a Child	Counselor	Television film
1999	Stir of Echoes	McCarthy	
2001	The Secret	Olenka	
2001	Soul Survivors	Stern Nurse	
2001	Danny's Wish	Cindy Rackley	
2002	Design	Delilah	
2002	No Sleep 'til Madison	Loraine	
2004	50 First Dates	Alexa	
2005	Miss Congeniality 2: Armed and Fabulous	Janine	
2006	Moonpie	Maureen	
2007	I'm with Stupid	Jean	Television film
2007	Playing with Chicken	—N/a	Television film
2011	Restless	Rachel Cotton	
2014	Kelly & Cal	Mitzi	
2014	The Mend	Beatrice	
2015	Everyday Miracles	Maggie Mae Welles-Cooper	
2019	Buffaloed	Frances	
2020	Soul	Oksana	Uncredited
2023	Paint	Beverly	

=== Television ===
Year	Title	Role	Notes
1998	Cupid	Slinky Woman	Episode: "Meat Market"
2000	Early Edition	Patty Davlin	Episode: "Mel Schwartz, Bounty Hunter"
2005–2007	Ned's Declassified School Survival Guide	Dr. Xavier	Recurring role (season 2–3); 11 episodes
2006	Crossing Jordan	Eddie Dawson's Girlfriend	Episode: "Someone to Watch Over Me"
2010–2012	Jack in a Box	Gloria	5 episodes
2011	Modern Family	Officer Blevin	Episode: "Phil on Wire"
2011	Blue Bloods	Angela Jackson	Episode: "Friendly Fire"
2013	Whatever This Is.	Donna	2 episodes
2015	Wayward Pines	Marcy (voice)	3 episodes
2016–2017	Good Behavior	Estelle	Main role; 20 episodes
2018	New Amsterdam	Jeffers	Episode: "Anthropocene"
2018–2019	Claws	Brenda	Guest (season 2), recurring role (season 3); 7 episodes
2019	The Blacklist	Marguerite Renard	Episode: "Marko Jankowics"
2020	Search Party	Melissa Miracle	2 episodes
2023	The Other Two	Sheila	Episode: "Cary Gets His Ass Handed to Him"
