= Racing for Time =

- Written by: Glenn German; Adam Rodgers
- Directed by: Charles S. Dutton
- Starring: Charles S. Dutton; Yaya DaCosta; Zulay Henao; Saige Thompson; Allesandra Fordballazes; Tiffany Haddish; Dequina Moore
- Country of origin: United States
- Original language: English

Production
- Producers: Peter Sadowski; Christopher Morgan
- Editor: Lance Anderson
- Running time: 1 hr minutes

Original release
- Release: February 19, 2008

Racing for Time is a 2008 Lifetime television film starring Charles S. Dutton, and Elizabeth Peña. The movie is based on the accomplishments of real-life coach and prison guard Sergeant Noel Chesnut (later promoted to lieutenant and then Captain) and the Ventura Youth Correctional Facility's track team he started. The real story took place in California in the 1990s when California's Youth Authority's correction's officer Noel Chesnut started a track team for female inmates throughout the Camarillo area facilities where many of the female offenders had been convicted of murder and robbery. Noel sacrificed a lot to encourage these girls and several of them went on to lead successful lives due to his program.

== Plot ==
Cleveland "Stack" Stackhouse (Charles S. Dutton) is a guard with the Texas Correctional Youth Authority who witnesses the cycle of destructive choices and racial tensions among female teen offenders and decides to do something about it. He gathers African-American, Latina and Caucasian teens, and organizes a multi-racial track team behind the bars of the prison. Participation in Stack's track team not only breaks down the racial divides between the girls, but also puts them on a path to turn their lives around.

== Cast ==
- Charles S. Dutton as Lieutenant Cleveland "Stack" Stackhouse
- Yaya DaCosta as Vanessa
- Zulay Henao as Carmen
- Saige Thompson as Cheryl
- Tiffany Haddish as Denise
- DeQuina Moore as Tonya
- Aujanue Ellis as Officer Baker
- Elizabeth Pena as Flores
- Lance E. Nichols as Keith Simons
- Ruthie Austin as Regina "Reggie" Donald
- Nicole Barre as "Crew Cut"
- Tameka Bob as "Tray" Williams
- Jessica Craig as Elaine "Lane Three"
- Stephen Edmond as Greer Fincher
- Shanna Forrestall as Sergeant Jane Daniels
- Douglas M. Griffin as Braylon Nash
- Sara Henriques as Maria
- Louis Herthum as Ralph Connelly
- Rachel Loera as Alex Pena
- Gregory Williams as "Coach"
- R.O. Mackey as Lieutenant Shelton (uncredited)

== See also ==
- List of films about the sport of athletics
- List of teachers portrayed in films
