= Blush (2019 film) =

2019 film

- Film poster
- Directed by: Debra Eisenstadt
- Written by: Debra Eisenstadt
- Produced by: Timur Bekbosunov; Debra Eisenstadt; Cosmos Kiindarius; Peter Wong
- Starring: Wendi McLendon-Covey
- Cinematography: Frank Tymezuk
- Edited by: Debra Eisenstadt; Clark Harris
- Music by: Mel Elias
- Production companies: ACE Pictures Entertainment; In Motion Pictures
- Distributed by: Gravitas Ventures
- Release dates: January 26, 2019 (Sundance); April 10, 2020 (United States)
- Running time: 101 minutes
- Country: United States
- Language: English

Blush is a 2019 American comedy-drama film directed by Debra Eisenstadt and starring Wendi McLendon-Covey. It premiered in the U.S. Dramatic Competition section at the 2019 Sundance Film Festival under the title Imaginary Order. The film was released on April 10, 2020 by Gravitas Ventures.

== Plot ==
McLendon-Covey plays Cathy, an obsessive-compulsive, middle-aged woman who wrongly suspects that her husband is having an affair. This belief serves as the catalyst for a series of bad choices on her part. Her entire life threatens to become unraveled after she is targeted by an obsessive teen boy.

== Cast ==
- Wendi McLendon-Covey as Cathy
- Christine Woods as Gemma Jean
- Max Burkholder as Xander
- Kate Alberts as Tara
- Steve Little as Matthew
- Catherine Curtin as Gail

== Reception ==
Writing in The Hollywood Reporter, critic Sheri Linden reported that "there’s little that’s neat and tidy about [the film] and that’s one of the movie’s key strengths," that "when it clicks, the film is a provocative combo of emotional fumbling, droll asides and shrewd insights," that the characters "all prove surprising, yet not always in good ways. They’re smart and they’re foolish," and "McLendon-Covey is a revelation [...] she wields her devastating timing in riveting ways here." A review of the film in The Santa Fe Reporter described it as "a strange drama [...] a subversive, excruciating look at suburban American family life and just how tenuous and absurd it can be," and noted that "Burkholder's portrayal of [a] lovesick teen is so painfully spot-on that we cringe despite our best attempts at empathy."

The film received mixed to positive reviews from critics. As of September 2021, 64% of the 14 reviews compiled on Rotten Tomatoes are positive, with an average rating of 6.5/10.
