= Darmirra Brunson =

American actress, comedian and singer

- Born: September 6, 1986 (age 39); Baltimore, Maryland, United States
- Occupations: Actress, Comedian, Singer, Writer
- Years active: 2002–present

Darmirra Brunson is an American actress, comedian and singer. She is best known for her role as Drew in the new sitcom Love Thy Neighbor.

== Career ==
In 2013, she joined the cast of the new sitcom Tyler Perry's Love Thy Neighbor. She has her own show on YouTube, called The Darmirra Show where she performs numerous spot-on impressions of her celebrities such as Beyoncé Knowles, Azealia Banks, Wendy Williams, Sway Calloway, Heidi Montag, DMX, Kanye West, Kelly Rowland, Lil' Kim, Remy Ma, Whitney Houston, Nicki Minaj, Rihanna and Mariah Carey and Iggy Azalea. She also does some of her original characters like Gretchen Murdle, Larry Steinburg and Aquafina.

== Filmography ==
Film
Year	Title	Role	Notes
2011	Perfect Man	Nail Shop Patron	
2018	All The Way With You	Chanice Morgan	

Television
Year	Title	Role	Notes
2004	Girlfriends	Jenifer	1 episode
2013–2017	Love Thy Neighbor	Drew Scott	Series regular
2017	ATL	Janet Brown	Series Regular
