= Phat Girlz =

2006 film by Nnegest Likké

- Theatrical release poster
- Directed by: Nnegest Likké
- Written by: Nnegest Likké
- Produced by: Robert F. Newmyer; Steven J. Wolfe; Steven Imes; Michael Glassman
- Starring: Mo'Nique; Jimmy Jean-Louis
- Cinematography: John L. Demps, Jr. Dean Lent
- Edited by: Zack Arnold
- Music by: Stephen Endelman
- Production company: Sneak Preview Entertainment
- Distributed by: Fox Searchlight Pictures
- Release date: April 7, 2006
- Running time: 100 minutes
- Country: United States
- Language: English
- Budget: $3 million
- Box office: $18.6 million

Phat Girlz is a 2006 American romantic comedy film written and directed by Nnegest Likké and starring Mo'Nique, as well as Jimmy Jean-Louis, Kendra C. Johnson, Godfrey, and Joyful Drake.

== Plot ==
Jazmin Biltmore is a plus-sized department store employee who struggles with her weight. She creates and designs her own outfits, even going as far as attempting to get a business loan to get her clothing line established.

She is contacted from one of her diet plan agencies and told she won a trip for three to Palm Springs at a five-star resort. She and friend Stacey find the first day at the spa disappointing since nothing was plus-sized friendly. They leave in frustration to join Mia, who has been ogling a Nigerian man swimming in the pool. Despite Mia's obvious flirting, he expresses interest in Jazmin instead. He introduces himself as Dr. Tunde. He and his friends find Jazmin and Stacey beautiful. However, they think Mia is too skinny and wonder if she is sick. They invite the women to a Nigerian party that night.

During their night out, Tunde expresses even more interest with Jazmin's outspoken behaviour and strong opinions. Akibo shows his desire for Stacey and she reciprocates, fighting her shy nature. Meanwhile Godwin attempts to flirt with other full figured guests, ignoring Mia. Akibo and Stacey go on to have days packed with vigorous sex and Mia leaves the party early to go back to the hotel.

Jazmin and Tunde begin dating. Jazmin constantly questions his attraction to her, going as far as to ask him why they have not slept together yet if he is truly interested in her. Tunde tells Jazmin he was trying to be respectful but will gladly sleep with her the next day due to work obligations that night. Before they consummate their relationship, she grows jealous and makes a scene when she sees him having dinner with a thin woman instead of with a colleague like he had told her. Tunde reveals the woman is his colleague, but Jazmin, realizing she is too insecure to be comfortable in a relationship with Tunde, breaks up with him and leaves Palm Springs along with Stacey and Mia.

At home, she is depressed, ignoring phone calls, comforting herself with food and television before having a breakthrough and realizing she is beautiful and worthy of being loved. Bursting with new confidence, Jazmin approaches the head buyer of Bloomfeld's where she works and shows him her designs. Impressed, he helps develop Jazmin's fashion line "Thick Madame". The line becomes popular and is launched worldwide.

One year later, she travels to Nigeria to apologize to Tunde. A woman opens the door holding a baby. Jazmin asks if she is Tunde's wife, and the woman agrees. When Tunde appears, she tells him that he has changed her life, and she is sorry she could not accept his love when she had the chance. Tunde clarifies that the woman is a maid and that he is still single. He says his prayers have been answered, as he has loved Jazmin all along, and they share a passionate kiss. Stacey also reunites with their partner, and they join Tunde's family for dinner. The film ends with Jazmin and Tunde in bed, with Jazmin insisting on having the lights on when they sleep together.

== Cast ==
- Mo'Nique as Jazmin Biltmore
  - Carla Jeffery as Young Jazmin Biltmore (age 10)
  - Raven Goodwin as Young Jazmin Biltmore (age 13)
- Jimmy Jean-Louis as Dr. Tunde Jonathan
- Godfrey as Akibo
- Kendra C. Johnson as Stacey
- Joyful Drake as Mia
- Dayo Ade as Goodwin
- Felix Pire as Ramón
- Charles Duckworth as Jack
- Jack Noseworthy as Richard "Dick" Eklund
- Eric Roberts as Robert Myer
- Crystal Rivers as Aimee

== Production ==
The food facility used to film the FatAssBurger scene was the Fatburger in Palm Springs, California. It is located near the Palm Springs International Airport.

== Box office ==
Though critically panned, the film is considered to be a financial success because it recouped its $3 million production budget from theatrical and rental revenues, totaling over $18.6 million.

In its opening weekend, the film grossed a total of $3,109,924 in the United States. The film has grossed a total of $7,061,128 in theaters in the United States. It also made $340,762 overseas, thus totaling $7,401,890 in theaters worldwide.

It also made an additional $11,250,000 on DVD and home video rentals in 2006.

== Critical reception ==
The film received mostly negative reviews, with Rotten Tomatoes reporting that out of 47 reviews, 10 were "Fresh" and 37 "Rotten," making for an overall 21% approval rating and the consensus: "Although Phat Girlz has good intentions, it is sloppily made and thin on laughs." The film has a slightly higher score of 36/100 on Metacritic, indicating "generally unfavorable" reviews. The San Francisco Chronicle praised the film, saying "Clumsily directed yet entertainingly written by Oakland native Nnegest Likké, Phat Girlz is like Rocky with cellulite. Or maybe Pretty Woman without all the bony butts. It has a lot of heart and soul, but it's almost never mean-spirited."

Variety magazine's Joe Leydon said that the film "feels torturously padded at an overlong 98 minutes," and also claims that the romance between Jazmin (Mo'Nique) and Tunde (Jean-Louis) is too drawn out, "quite possibly because writer-director Nnegest Likke has nothing else in her scenario to sustain audience interest." Entertainment Weekly gave the film a D grade, remarking that "Mo'Nique is fat. Almost every scene in Phat Girlz — the fancy z is for Z-grade — is about how she's fat," and concluding that "the movie reduces her to a single discernible characteristic, which is a telltale mark of many a wholly awful comedy."
