= Office Romance (2026 film) =

2026 film by Ol Parker

- Release poster
- Directed by: Ol Parker
- Written by: Brett Goldstein; Joe Kelly
- Produced by: Aaron Ryder; Andrew Swett; Jennifer Lopez; Elaine Goldsmith-Thomas; Benny Medina; Brett Goldstein; Joe Kelly
- Starring: Jennifer Lopez; Brett Goldstein; Betty Gilpin; Amy Sedaris; Tony Hale; Bradley Whitford; Edward James Olmos
- Cinematography: Robert Yeoman
- Edited by: Peter Lambert
- Music by: Michael Andrews
- Production companies: Netflix Studios; Nuyorican Productions; RPC; For the Table; Hey Buddy
- Distributed by: Netflix
- Release date: June 5, 2026
- Running time: 115 minutes
- Country: United States
- Language: English

Office Romance is a 2026 American romantic comedy film directed by Ol Parker, written by Brett Goldstein and Joe Kelly and starring Jennifer Lopez and Goldstein.

Iron-fisted President and CEO of Air Cruz Jackie Cruz runs the company with rigid control, including a no-fraternization policy for all, which is put to the test when she and a new lawyer who begins working for her are mutually irresistibly attracted. The film received mixed reviews from critics.

== Plot ==
Jackie Cruz is the CEO and president of Air Cruz, a major airline founded by her demanding father. Constantly under scrutiny from the company board and desperate to earn her father's respect, Jackie runs a tight ship. This includes enforcing a rigid anti-fraternization policy across all tiers of the company. Jackie's hyper-focus on her career has left her with a meticulously built but completely isolated personal life.

The status quo is disrupted by the arrival of Daniel Blanchflower, a reserved British attorney hired as the company's new legal counsel. Daniel, who recently relocated to the United States due to complicated family obligations, is assigned a high-stakes litigation case that forces him to work closely with Jackie. Despite their differences in hierarchical status within the company and Jackie's imposing demeanor, the two share an immediate, underlying professional chemistry. Daniel initially manages to impress Jackie during a corporate deposition, though their proximity severely tests the very corporate boundaries Jackie instituted.

Another case requires Jackie to fly to a deposition in the Dominican Republic, and she suggests at the company meeting that Daniel is the appointed attorney to accompany her. She then personally pilots the company private plane there, leaving her completely alone with Daniel. In the tropical setting, away from the rigid confines of the corporate office, they drop their buttoned-up professional guards. Giving in to their mutual attraction, they begin a passionate romantic affair.

Upon returning to New Jersey, Jackie and Daniel try to conceal their relationship from the rest of the company. However, their efforts are constantly threatened by their boldness, driven by their uncontrollable attraction, and a highly observant office colleague. The stakes escalate dramatically when the opposing legal counsel attempts to weaponize Jackie's affair with Daniel, threatening the future of Air Cruz and her standing with her father and the board.

The corporate tension reaches a boiling point ahead of a crucial press conference, where Jackie finally plans to announce her resignation as CEO of the company. While attempting to reach the corporate headquarters to defend both the company and their relationship, Daniel is delayed by traffic and trapped in the Holland Tunnel. He manages to arrive at the exact critical moment before she breaks the news, and is forced to publicly express his feelings for her and defends her competence as CEO in order to stop her from resigning. Supported by her father, who also publicly acknowledges her competence as a CEO, they successfully navigate any potential objections from the board, rewrite the company's archaic HR rulebook, and openly embrace their relationship.

== Cast ==
- Jennifer Lopez as Jacqueline "Jackie" Cruz, the CEO of AirCruz and a pilot
- Brett Goldstein as Daniel Blanchflower, AirCruz's new in-house lawyer
- Betty Gilpin as Sydney Bloom, Jackie's right-hand woman
- Amy Sedaris as Julie Schatz
- Jodie Whittaker as Lizzy, Daniel's sister who is in prison
- Mary Wiseman as Clair, Daniel's assistant at AirCruz
- Tony Hale as George Dudek, the HR director of AirCruz
- Bradley Whitford as Peter Vance, AirCruz's general counsel
- Edward James Olmos as Captain Jack Cruz, the founder of AirCruz and Jackie's father
- Tony Plana as Francisco Alberto, a board member of AirCruz
- Roger Bart as William Butten, the CEO of Falcon Airlines
- Rick Hoffman as Carl Gunderson, Falcon Airlines' lawyer
- Jackie Sandler as Caroline
- Michelle Hurd as Rachael Goldberg
- Ali Stroker as Maggie
- Lisa Gilroy as Tanya
- Will Sasso as Larry
- Norm Lewis as Richard Howell
- Natalie Ortega as Heather
- Mo Welch as Debbie
- Donald Elise Watkins as Henry
- Brian Gallivan as Fredrick
- Scott Seiss as Dave
- Stephen Park as Luke
- Jessica Keenan Wynn as Emily Swensek
- Amanda Aday as Bernadette
- Juan Carlos Hernández as Mike, the mechanic
- Malik Elassal as Marcus
- X Mayo as Vanessa
- Zuhdi Boueri as Dylan

== Production ==
The film stars Brett Goldstein and Jennifer Lopez and was co-written by Goldstein with Joe Kelly for Netflix. Betty Gilpin joined the cast in February 2025. The following month, Edward James Olmos joined the cast, reuniting with Lopez after starring in Selena (1997) together, where they also played father and daughter. In April 2025, a number of cast members were announced including Bradley Whitford, Amy Sedaris, and Tony Hale.

It was produced by Aaron Ryder and Andrew Swett for Ryder Picture Company, along with Goldstein, Joe Kelly, Lopez, Elaine Goldsmith-Thomas, and Benny Medina for Nuyorican Productions via the company's first-look deal with Netflix.

Ol Parker joined the project as director in November 2024. Principal photography began in New Jersey in March 2025, with filming locations including Kenilworth. Peter Lambert serves as the editor.

== Release ==
Office Romance was released on Netflix on June 5, 2026.

== Reception ==
On the review aggregator website Rotten Tomatoes, 47% of 76 critics' reviews are positive, with an average rating of 5.4/10. The website's consensus reads: "Polished as a business presentation and just as impersonal, Office Romance is headed by a likable pairing but proves too content to follow the rules of standard rom-coms to nab a promotion into the C-suite." Metacritic, which uses a weighted average, assigned the film a score of 52 out of 100, based on 22 critics, indicating "mixed or average" reviews.

Lisa Kennedy of The New York Times wrote, "The writers Goldstein and Joe Kelly attempt to cram a streaming season’s worth of character zigs into a two-hour film. Alas, the landing isn’t smooth." Monica Castillo of The AV Club wrote, "While the romance here feels tenuous at best, the comedy is in even worse shape, often mistaking uncomfortable oversharing for punchlines. If this was meant to be a return to form for Lopez, it’s not a satisfying comeback."

In a positive review, Guy Lodge of Variety wrote, "Soft and cottony and just peculiar enough to be memorable, Office Romance gives the people what they want." Brian Truitt of USA Today wrote, "The film can’t escape all of the usual genre tropes or overt sentimentality, yet that's tempered by a bawdy sense of humor and fits of wild broad comedy."
