= The Single Moms Club =

- Theatrical release poster
- Directed by: Tyler Perry
- Written by: Tyler Perry
- Produced by: Tyler Perry; Ozzie Areu; Matt Moore
- Starring: Nia Long; Amy Smart; Cocoa Brown; Terry Crews; William Levy; Wendi McLendon-Covey; Ryan Eggold; Zulay Henao; Tyler Perry
- Cinematography: Alexander Gruszynski
- Edited by: Maysie Hoy
- Music by: Christopher Young
- Production company: Tyler Perry Studios
- Distributed by: Lionsgate
- Release date: March 14, 2014
- Running time: 111 minutes
- Country: United States
- Languages: English; Spanish
- Budget: $8 million
- Box office: $16.4 million

The Single Moms Club is a 2014 American comedy-drama film produced, written, and directed by Tyler Perry. The film stars Nia Long, Wendi McLendon-Covey, Zulay Henao, Cocoa Brown, Amy Smart, Terry Crews, and Perry. The film was released on March 14, 2014. The film received negative reviews from critics and was a box office disappointment, only grossing $16.4 million against a budget of $8 million.

== Plot ==
The story is about a group of five single mothers with very different backgrounds who come together when their 11 to 12-year-old kids collectively get in trouble at their private school.

Hillary has three kids, and her ex-husband refuses to pay child support because she has the house. Jan is an executive and struggles to hold on to her stressful publishing career. May is a journalist, aspires to be an author, and has a drug-addict ex and a teenage son interested to know more about his dad. Esperanza hides her new boyfriend Manny from her ex-husband Santos because she fears she might lose his financial support. Lytia, a sassy waitress, tries to keep her youngest son from falling into a life of crime.

Lytia rushes out of her diner with her two kids to catch the bus, but misses it, so Branson, a personal trainer interested in her, offers her a ride to a school meeting. May meets Jan about publishing her book, but Jan rejects it. May's car won't start so she asks T.K. to help, but she leaves her purse behind while rushing to the meeting.

At the meeting the principal tells the parents that their children vandalized the school and were caught smoking. The board wanted to expel them, but she asked for a probationary period for them. She asks the parents to volunteer for the fundraiser and school dance. The five agree to meet up later to organize.

After the meeting, T.K. brings May her purse and asks her out to dinner, but she declines. Esperanza goes to her daughter's birthday, where her ex gives his daughter a cell phone, which angers her as it undermines her parenting.

The five meet at Hillary's. Lytia arrives early and finds her distraught, as her ex took everything in the divorce and she had to fire the maid. In addition to organizing the dance, they decide to start The Single Mom's Club to support single moms everywhere. Afterwards, each woman has her own drama: May picks her son up from school as his father never showed up, Jan didn't get the promotion she'd hoped for, Branson brings Lytia a funeral wreath because he likes her, and T.K. read May's book and liked it. They meet up for coffee to discuss their situations.

As the enchanted forest is the theme the group chose for the dance, Hillary asks her new neighbor, Peter to build the forest for it. The group decides to go out socially every week, so they take turns watching each others kids. For an organized movie night, Hillary looks after the kids while Esperanza takes Manny, and May hooks Jan up with Tony, a friend from work. While at the movies May's son runs away and they cannot find him. Blowing up at everyone, May tells them to leave, severing ties with the group. T.K. stays at May's to comfort her. When her son finally comes home, he tells her he went to see his dad. He went by bus, and his dad robbed him for drugs. Upset, he wants to know why she hadn't told him he's an addict.

Esperanza goes to her ex's car dealership to confront him about undermining her and threatens to take him to court for more child support. By the end, all five women make up with their children, May finally decides to join the ladies at the school dance, and The Single Mom's Club is back on.

== Cast ==
- Nia Long as May
- Amy Smart as Hillary
- Cocoa Brown as Lytia
- Terry Crews as Branson
- William Levy as Manny
- Wendi McLendon-Covey as Jan
- Tyler Perry as TK
- Eddie Cibrian as Santos
- Ryan Eggold as Peter
- Zulay Henao as Esperanza
- Sean Carrigan as Tony

== Filming ==
The Single Moms Club began filming on November 26, 2012, in the city of Avondale Estates, Georgia.

== Reception ==
The Single Moms Club received negative reviews from critics. On Rotten Tomatoes, it has an approval rating of 19% based on 27 reviews, with an average rating of 4.4/10. The site's critical consensus reads, "The Single Moms' Club finds Tyler Perry avoiding some of the pitfalls of his earlier work, but continuing to rely on heavy-handed melodrama at the expense of sensible characters or absorbing storylines."

On Metacritic, the film has a score of 31 out of 100, based on 16 critics, indicating "generally unfavorable reviews".

Audiences polled by CinemaScore gave the film an average grade of "A-" on an A+ to F scale.

Entertainment Weekly writer Chris Nashawaty rated the film a "C+" grade. He felt the female cast played "clichés cribbed from a booklet of screenwriting Mad Libs," and found Perry's filmmaking to be blunt and unsubtle with its "canned sentimentality, lazy stereotypes, and easy uplift."

Nicolas Rapold of The New York Times said:

"Mr. Perry's latest film touches upon some recognizable and realistic challenges with efficient compassion, but there's probably more dramatic tension in a car pool than in this film's collection of predicaments."

Jordan Hoffman, writing for the New York Daily News, gave credit to the Jan and Lytia pairing for having "a nice mix of comedy and genuine race/class tension", but criticized the other women for being "soap opera clichés" and the abandonment of the single-working-mother empowerment theme in favor of coincidental and ludicrous relationships, calling it "a film about catharsis and camaraderie, not logic." Alonso Duralde of TheWrap also found criticism in the movie's lazily-written, hard-working female characters and low entertainment value, saying "while it's frequently unintentionally hilarious, it's also crushingly dull."

Stephen Schaefer of the Boston Herald saw the women as "one-dimensional" with superficial lives and contrived problems that come to an unearned conclusion, calling the film "a lackluster empowerment fantasy that veers between dull and embarrassing". Jen Chaney of The Washington Post wrote that "The Single Moms Club goes for a mix of escapism and reality-based drama and winds up with a movie that can only be enjoyed via the running, snarky commentary that will inevitably scroll through most audience members' heads as they watch.

Ignatiy Vishnevetsky of The A.V. Club gave the film a "D+" grade, commending Perry for delivering an "uncharacteristically low-key and charismatic" performance and backhandedly complimented him for creating "a conventionally well-made film", but said: "Perry's movies are rarely dull or repetitive. The Single Moms Club, meandering and schlock-free, is an exception in this regard."

Scott Foundas of Variety said that the film showcases "[T]he prolific Tyler Perry muses on the travails of single motherhood and the ongoing battle of the sexes in a surprisingly sharp and funny female-empowerment ensemble". Sheila O'Malley from RogerEbert.com found the script's romantic relationships "slapdash" and clashing with the film's overall theme but commended Perry for handling the multiple storylines and the actresses for being "sympathetic and engaging", singling out Nia Long for being "emotionally accessible and funny" and bringing "a fresh and natural presence" to her role.

Claudia Puig of USA Today was favorable towards the actresses in the film, calling them "better than the material", but commented on the given dialogue as:

"...predictable and frequently pedestrian...It's an improvement on some of Perry's other films that strike a heavy-handed moralistic note. And it lacks the silly slapstick humor of his Madea movies."

== Television adaptation ==
On January 9, 2014, it was announced that the Oprah Winfrey Network ordered a drama series based on the film. The show premiered on September 9, 2014. Zulay Henao was the only actress from the film to reprise her role (Esperanza).
