= Wendi McLendon-Covey =

American actress and comedian (born 1969)

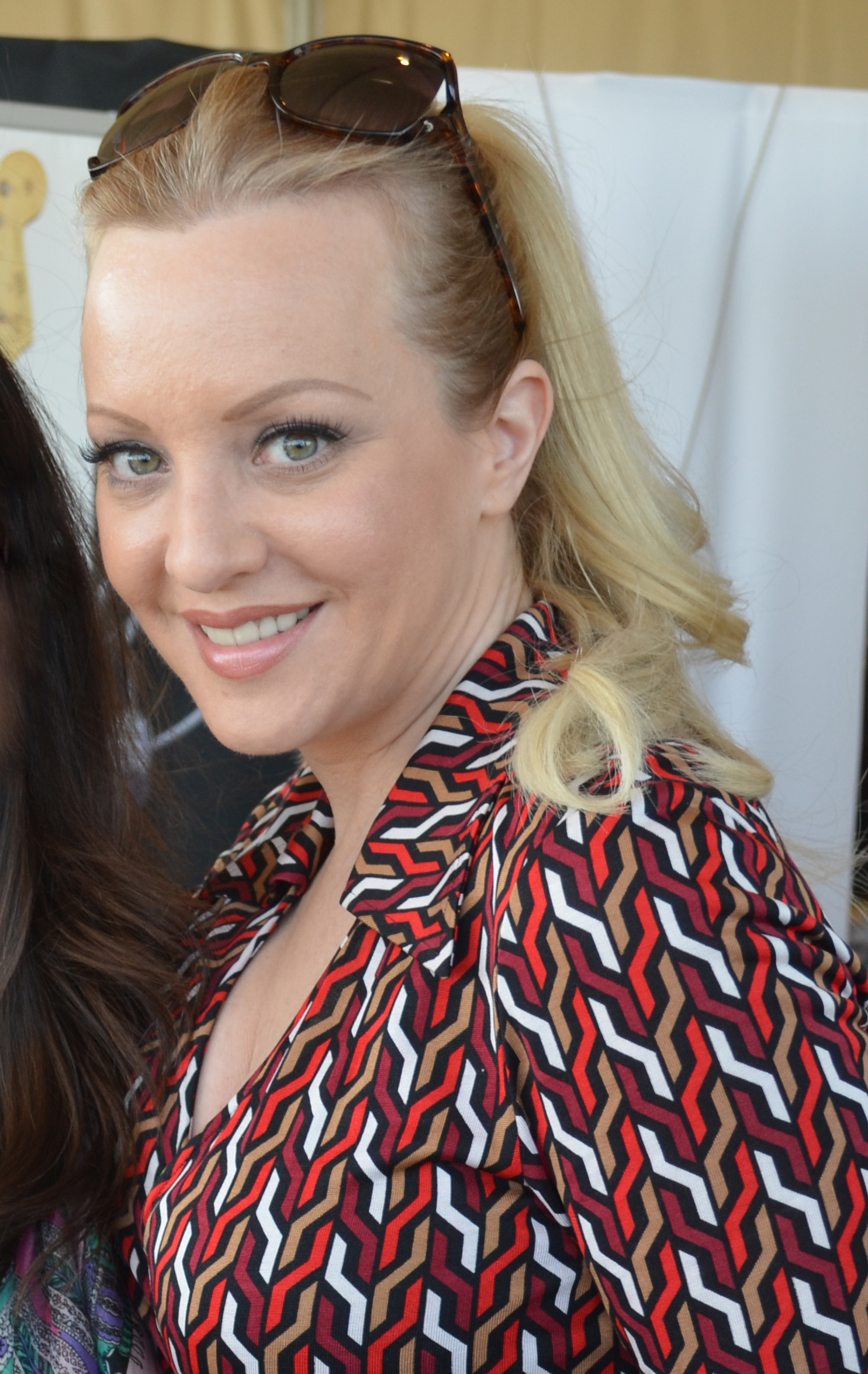
- McLendon-Covey in 2012
- Born: Wendi McLendon; October 10, 1969 (age 57); Bellflower, California, U.S.
- Education: California State University, Long Beach
- Occupations: Actress; comedian; property manager; former academic journal editor
- Years active: 2001–present
- Spouse: Greg Covey (m. 1996)

Wendi McLendon-Covey (née McLendon; born October 10, 1969) is an American actress and comedian known primarily for her work in comedic and improvisational roles. From 2013 until 2023, she played the role of family matriarch Beverly Goldberg on the ABC comedy series The Goldbergs, for which she was nominated for two Critics' Choice Television Awards for Best Actress in a Comedy Series.

A native of Long Beach, California, McLendon-Covey worked numerous jobs after graduating from high school before earning a degree from California State University, Long Beach, in 2000. After graduating, she became a member of The Groundlings, an improvisational comedy group in Los Angeles, and remained a member until 2009. McLendon-Covey began her acting career while still a member of the Groundlings, starring as Deputy Clementine Johnson in the improvisational series Reno 911! (2003–2008, 2020–2022). She also had the lead role in the Lifetime short-lived comedy Lovespring International (2006), as well as minor roles in Bewitched (2005) and Over Her Dead Body (2008). McLendon-Covey had a recurring role on the CBS sitcom Rules of Engagement (2010–2013).

After a breakout performance in the 2011 comedy film Bridesmaids, McLendon-Covey has appeared in a number of films, including What to Expect When You're Expecting (2012), The Single Moms Club (2014), Blended (2014), Think Like a Man Too (2014), Hello, My Name Is Doris (2015), Goosebumps 2: Haunted Halloween (2018), What Men Want (2019), Sylvie's Love (2020), Barb and Star Go to Vista Del Mar (2021), and Elemental (2023). In 2019, after years in comedy roles, McLendon-Covey played a leading role in the independent drama film Blush. Since 2024, she has starred as Joyce in the NBC mockumentary sitcom St. Denis Medical.

== Early life and education ==
McLendon-Covey was born in Bellflower, California, in the family of Carolyn and Robert McLendon. She was raised Baptist, in Long Beach, California. She has a younger sister named Shelley McLendon. She went to DeMille Junior High and graduated from Millikan High School. She attended Long Beach City College, Golden West College, and California State University, Long Beach, where she graduated with a B.A. in liberal studies and creative writing.

While McLendon-Covey was working at a hotel in Anaheim and after graduating from college, she enrolled in a weekend class for non-actors at The Groundlings, an improvisational group in Los Angeles. She officially joined The Groundlings in 2002, and meanwhile worked as an editor for California State University's academic journal of social work, a job she kept until 2012.

== Career ==
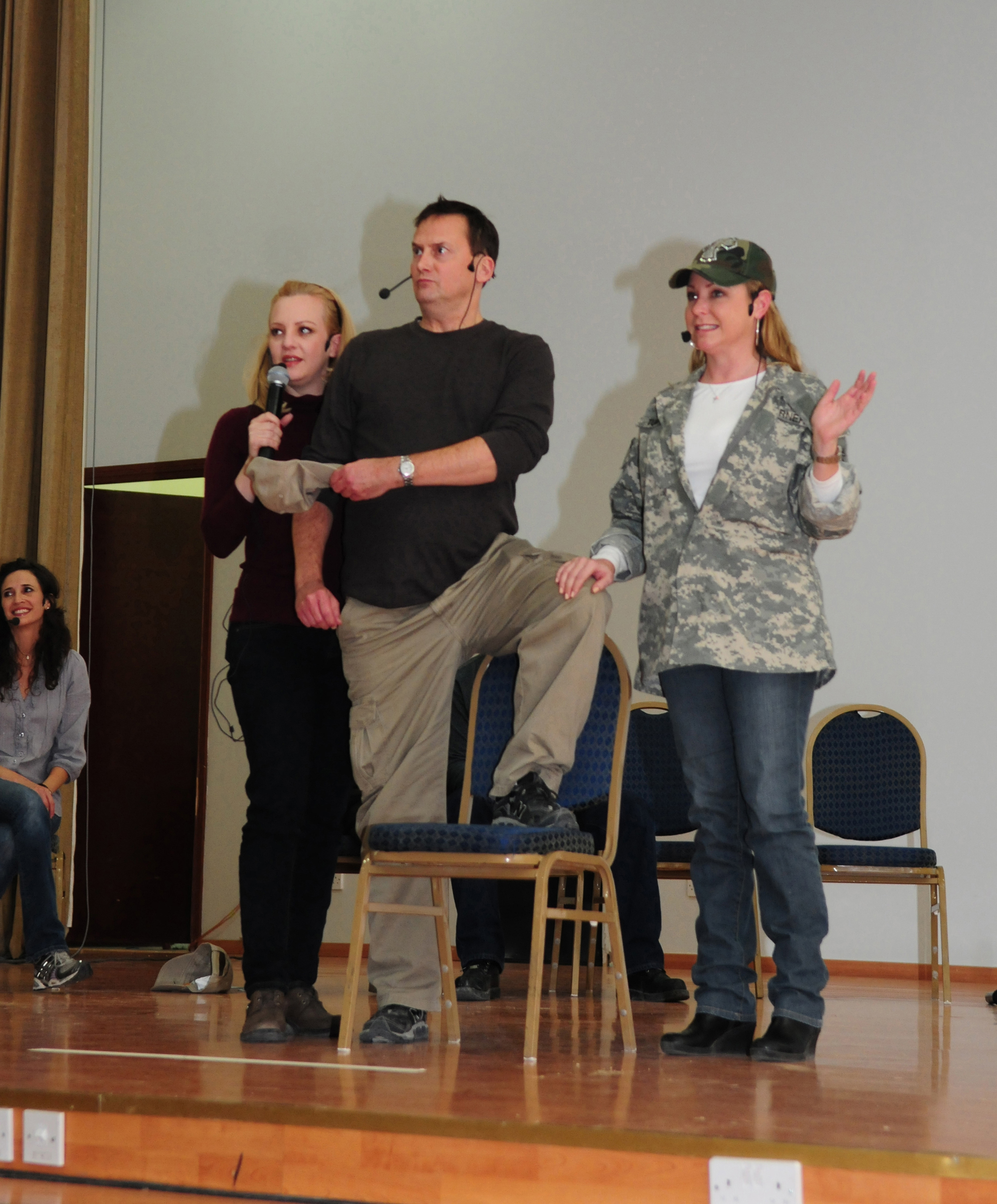
McLendon-Covey performing with Michael Hitchcock and Karri Turner at improv comedy show in 2010

=== 2001–2010 ===
While a member of the Groundlings, McLendon-Covey was a classmate of comedians Kaitlin Olson, Melissa McCarthy and Kristen Wiig, the latter two of whom she later starred alongside in the film Bridesmaids. While a member of the Groundlings, McLendon-Covey steadily auditioned for television and film roles, but did not have an agent at the time and was unable to book jobs.

In 2003, she auditioned for the role of Deputy Clementine Johnson in the comedy series Reno 911! "I went in, and I thought, Fuck this. I'm not gonna get it, but you know what? I'm just gonna go in [and try]," she recalled. At the time, the series had previously been considered by Fox. McLendon-Covey was cast in the role, and the series was subsequently picked up by Comedy Central.

In the third year of Reno 911!, she also starred in the Lifetime comedy show Lovespring International in 2006 and has provided commentary for E!, TV Guide Channel, and VH1. In 2007, she starred in the comedy film Reno 911!: Miami, based on Comedy Central's Reno 911! and also appeared in Bewitched (2005) and Over Her Dead Body (2008). She produced, wrote, and starred in the 2007 independent comedy film Cook Off!. McLendon-Covey also guest-starred on television series such as The Office, 10 Things I Hate About You, and Cougar Town.

=== 2011–present ===
In 2011, McLendon-Covey starred in the financially successful and critically lauded comedy film Bridesmaids with Kristen Wiig, Maya Rudolph, Rose Byrne, Melissa McCarthy, and Ellie Kemper. Beginning in July that same year, she began starring in national TV ads for a new campaign by Hillshire Farm. From 2010 to 2013, she had a recurring role on the CBS sitcom Rules of Engagement. She also had guest-starring roles in Fox's short-lived sitcom I Hate My Teenage Daughter, TV Land's Hot in Cleveland, and ABC's Modern Family.

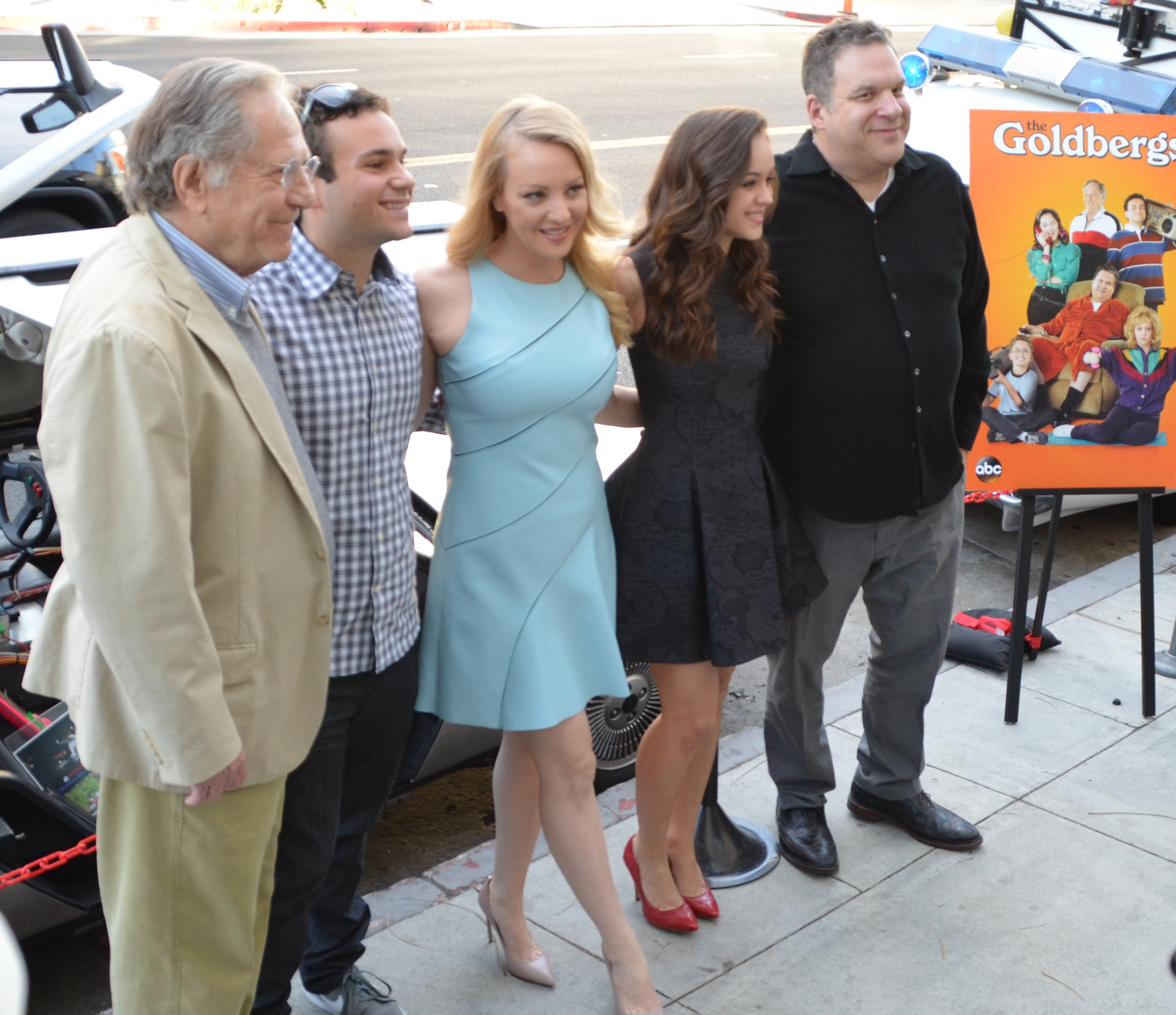
McLendon-Covey with The Goldbergs cast in 2014

McLendon-Covey appeared in the 2012 romantic comedy What to Expect When You're Expecting, directed by Kirk Jones, and Steven Soderbergh's film Magic Mike. She had roles in the Christmas comedy movie A White Trash Christmas about a mom visited by three ghosts intent on showing her a path to a brighter future, and in the comedy-drama film The Breakup Girl directed by Academy Award-nominated and Emmy-winning Stacy Sherman about three estranged sisters dealing with the death of their father.

In February 2012, McLendon-Covey was cast in the HBO comedy pilot The Viagra Diaries, created by Sex and the City creator and executive producer Darren Star, but when Goldie Hawn exited the pilot, McLendon-Covey also left the show. After she received five offers, she won the female lead role on ABC's comedy pilot Only Fools And Horses. She also played one of the leads in Tyler Perry's film The Single Moms Club (2014). Also in 2014, she starred in A Merry Friggin' Christmas as Robin Williams' character's daughter, Blended, as Drew Barrymore's character's best friend, and Think Like a Man Too.

In January 2013, McLendon-Covey was cast in the lead role of the ABC comedy series The Goldbergs, created by Adam F. Goldberg. Her portrayal of the character received critical praise, and she was nominated for a Critics' Choice Television Award for Best Actress in a Comedy Series in 2014. The series lasted ten years and 229 episodes were produced. She also served as a producer and later as an executive producer of the series.

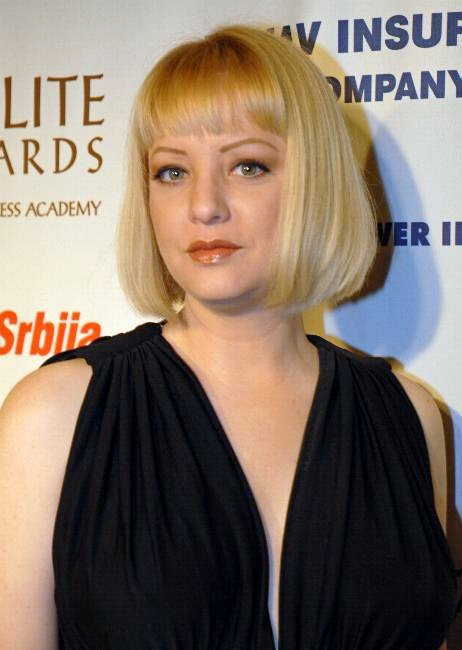
McLendon-Covey in 2007

In 2015, McLendon-Covey co-starred opposite Sally Field in the comedy-drama film Hello, My Name Is Doris. Also that year, McLendon-Covey hosted ABC reality comedy series Repeat After Me, produced by Ellen DeGeneres. In 2016, she played the female leading role opposite Nicolas Cage in the comedy film Army of One, directed by Larry Charles.

McLendon-Covey had a dramatic role as Mark Felt's secretary Carol Tschudy in the political thriller film Mark Felt: The Man Who Brought Down the White House (2017), directed by Peter Landesman. She later played a leading role in the independent drama film Blush that premiered at the 2019 Sundance Film Festival. She starred in the 2018 horror comedy Goosebumps 2: Haunted Halloween and co-starred opposite Taraji P. Henson in the 2019 romantic comedy What Men Want. Since 2018, she has played the voice role of Nancy Green in the Disney Channel animated series Big City Greens. In 2020, she continued appearing in a dramatic roles co-starring opposite Tessa Thompson in Sylvie's Love. In 2020, McLendon-Covey reunited with Bridesmaids co-stars Kristen Wiig and Annie Mumolo in the comedy film Barb and Star Go to Vista Del Mar.

From April 2020 to July 2022, McLendon-Covey co-hosted the pop culture podcast Generation Ripe with surfographer/photo art director and producer Dfernando Zaremba. The podcast's audience was teenagers over 40 and featured interviews with guests from all realms of the entertainment industry and the arts. Also in 2020, McLendon-Covey returned for the seventh season of Reno 911! which was aired on Quibi. In 2021, the movie Reno 911! The Hunt for QAnon was released on Paramount+. The eighth season of the series, now titled Reno 911!: Defunded, premiered on The Roku Channel in February 2022. She co-starred with Owen Wilson in the comedy-drama film Paint; it was released on April 7, 2023.

In 2023, McLendon-Covey played Vicky White in the Lifetime movie Bad Romance: The Vicky White Story based on the manhunt for escaped inmate Casey White and Lauderdale County jailer Vicky White.

McLendon-Covey currently stars on NBC's hit comedy, St. Denis Medical. The show was recently renewed for a third season.

== Personal life ==
McLendon-Covey has been married to property manager and former corporate executive Greg Covey since 1996. Greg has been diagnosed with Parkinson's disease.

== Filmography ==
=== Film ===
Year	Film	Role	Notes
2001	Henry and Marvin	Judy	Short film
2005	Bewitched	E! Anchor	
2007	Reno 911!: Miami	Deputy Clementine Johnson	
2007	Closing Escrow	Hillary	US Comedy Arts Festival for Best Comedy Performance in Film
2007	Cook Off!	Pauline Solfest	Also co-writer US Comedy Arts Festival for Best Comedy Performance in Film
2007	Goldfish	Mrs. Jenkins	
2008	Over Her Dead Body	Lona	
2009	Boutonniere	Mrs. Pruitt	
2009	Spooner	Linda	
2009	Jesus People: The Movie	Jenna Bosch	
2010	Starlight & Superfish	Dawn	
2010	Douchebag	Mary Barger	
2010	Tug	Taylor	
2010	Public Relations	Candice	
2010	The Search for Santa Paws	Ms. Stout	
2011	Sometimes Pretty Girls	Tootsie	Short film
2011	Bridesmaids	Rita	New York Film Critics Online Award for Best Ensemble Cast; Washington D.C. Area Film Critics Association Award for Best Ensemble; MTV Movie Award for Best Gut-Wrenching Performance; LA Femme Film Festival Comedic Actress Award; Nominated—Screen Actors Guild Award for Outstanding Performance by a Cast in a Motion Picture; Nominated—MTV Movie Award for Best Cast; Nominated—Broadcast Film Critics Association Award for Best Acting Ensemble; Nominated—People's Choice Awards for Best Ensemble Cast; Nominated—Central Ohio Film Critics Association for Best Acting Ensemble
2012	Holiday Road	Rosman	
2012	What to Expect When You're Expecting	Kara	
2012	Magic Mike	Tara	Scenes deleted
2013	10 Rules for Sleeping Around	Emma Cooney	
2013	All American Christmas Carol	Marjorie	
2014	Date and Switch	Linda	
2014	Cuban Fury	Carly	
2014	The Single Moms Club	Jan Malkovitch	
2014	Blended	Jen	
2014	Think Like a Man Too	Tish	
2014	A Merry Friggin' Christmas	Shauna	
2015	The Breakup Girl	Sharon	
2015	Hello, My Name Is Doris	Cynthia	
2016	Army of One	Marci	
2017	Speech & Debate	Joan	
2017	Mark Felt: The Man Who Brought Down the White House	Carol Tschudy	
2018	Status Update	Ann Moore	
2018	Goosebumps 2: Haunted Halloween	Kathy Quinn	
2019	Blush	Cathy	
2019	What Men Want	Olivia	
2019	Braking for Whales	Aunt Jackie Hillhouse	
2020	Sylvie's Love	Lucy	
2021	Barb and Star Go to Vista Del Mar	Mickey Revelet	
2021	Long Weekend	Patricia	
2023	Prom Pact	Alyssa Yang	
2023	Paint	Wendy	
2023	Elemental	Gale Cumulus	Voice
2023	Sick Girl	Carol Pepper	
2024	Big City Greens the Movie: Spacecation	Nancy Green	Voice
2027	Romy and Michele 2	TBA	Filming
TBA	The Decline of Fucking Western Civilization	TBA	Filming

=== Television ===
Year	Title	Role	Notes
2003–2008, 2020–2022	Reno 911!	Deputy Clementine Johnson	Series regular, 106 episodes
2006	Lovespring International	Lydia Mayhew	Series regular, 13 episodes
2008	Greek	Connie	Episode: "Spring Broke"
2008	The Office	Concierge Marie	Episode: "Business Trip"
2008	Kath & Kim	Lucy	Episode: "Friends"
2009	10 Things I Hate About You	Vivian	2 episodes
2009	Wizards of Waverly Place	Dr. Ice	Episode: "Three Monsters"
2010–2013	Rules of Engagement	Liz	Recurring role, 14 episodes
2011	Cougar Town	Vice Principal	Episode: "You're Gonna Get It!"
2011	Svetlana	Phoebe	2 episodes
2011	I Hate My Teenage Daughter	Deanna	2 episodes
2012	Hot in Cleveland	Sandy	Episode: "God and Football"
2012	Fish Hooks	Ruby	Voice, episode: "Spiders Bite"
2012	Wedding Band	Barb Henderson	Episode: "I Don't Wanna Grow Up"
2012	Only Fools and Horses	Ruby Ross	Television pilot
2012	The Looney Tunes Show	Patricia Bunny	Voice, 3 episodes
2012	RuPaul's Drag Race: All Stars	Herself	Episode: "Dynamic Drag Duos"
2012	You're Whole	Jenny	Episode: "Finger Puppets/Saxophone/Fish Tank"
2012–2019	Bob's Burgers	Mudflap	Voice, 3 episodes
2012–2013	Modern Family	Pam	2 episodes
2013–2023	The Goldbergs	Beverly Goldberg	Series regular Nominated—Critics' Choice Television Award for Best Actress in a Comedy Series (2014, 2016)
2015	Repeat After Me	Host	8 episodes
2015	Long Live the Royals	Queen Eleanor	Voice, 4 episodes
2015-2019	Mike Tyson Mysteries	Sugar Monahan, Elsa Schmidt	Voice, 2 episodes
2015–2023	American Dad!	Autograph Seeker, Monkey Trainer, Scottie's Mom	Voice, 6 episodes
2016	Last Week Tonight with John Oliver	Ambulance Dispatcher	Episode: "911"
2016–2017	Pickle and Peanut	Peanut's Mom / various	Voice, 6 episodes
2018, 2024	Blaze and the Monster Machines	Cousins Milly and Frilly	Voice, 2 episodes
2018–present	Big City Greens	Nancy Green	Voice, 42 episodes; recurring/series regular
2018, 2020	Puppy Dog Pals	Alberta, Mrs. Claus	Voice, 3 episodes
2019	Schooled	Beverly Goldberg	2 episodes
2020–2021	Solar Opposites	P.A.T.R.I.C.I.A. / Cindeen	Voice, 2 episodes
2020–2021	Crossing Swords	Doreen	Voice, 10 episodes
2021	Birdgirl		Voice, episode: "Topple the Popple"
2021	M.O.D.O.K.	Monica Rappaccini	Voice, 10 episodes
2021	Ten Year Old Tom		Voice, episode: "Art Class/Problem Moms"
2021	Reno 911!: The Hunt for QAnon	Deputy Clementine Johnson	Television film; also executive producer Nominated — Primetime Emmy Award for Outstanding Television Movie
2022	Reno 911!: It's a Wonderful Heist	Deputy Clementine Johnson	Television film; also executive producer
2023	StoryBots: Answer Time	Disco Delilah	Episode: "Area"
2023	Launchpad	Mel	Episode: "Beautiful, FL"
2023	History of the World, Part II	Russian Peasant	Episode: "III"
2023	Bad Romance: The Vicky White Story	Vicky White	Television film, also executive producer
2024	Grimsburg	Chief Patsy Stamos	Voice, 9 episodes
2024	Unstable	Adele	Episode: "Ron Tabasco"
2024–present	St. Denis Medical	Joyce Henderson	Main role
