= The Crush House =

2024 video game

- Developer: Nerial
- Publisher: Devolver Digital
- Composer: Andrea Boccadoro
- Engine: Unity
- Platform: Microsoft Windows
- Release: August 9, 2024
- Genres: Adventure; Simulation
- Mode: Single-player

The Crush House is an adventure simulation video game developed by Nerial and published by Devolver Digital on August 9, 2024 for Microsoft Windows. The game is set in the year 1999 and revolves around the production of a reality television show. Players take on the role of Jae, the new producer tasked with managing and filming the show within an iconic Malibu mansion. The game incorporates elements of strategic management, storytelling, and exploration, blending humor with dark, underlying themes.

== Gameplay ==
The primary objective of The Crush House is to maintain high viewer ratings by managing the dynamics among the cast members, capturing dramatic and romantic moments, and catering to various audience segments. Players can choose from twelve unique personalities to form a four-person cast for each season. Each character brings distinct traits and potential conflicts that add depth to the gameplay. Players must strategically select and manage the cast to meet audience demands, as the game features a range of audiences with specific preferences that need to be considered. Players are also responsible for generating revenue for the show by running ads during peak viewership, allowing them to purchase new props to unlock new interactions and please specific audiences. If the player fails to keep their audience entertained it will result in the show's cancellation. After the filming day concludes players are able to explore the Malibu mansion at night where they can break the networks rule of being forbidden to talk to the cast, accepting requests and completing favors for the cast members.

== Plot ==
Set in 1999, The Crush House centers around Jae, who has secured a dream job as a popular reality television show producer. As the producer, Jae must navigate the complex relationships among the cast members, ensure the show remains captivating, and meet the audience's high expectations. However, as the show progresses, Jae begins to uncover dark, sinister secrets lurking behind the scenes such as the mysterious dependence of the cast on "Crush Juice" and the hidden agendas of the network.

== Development ==
The Crush House is developed by Nerial, an indie game development studio based in the United Kingdom. Nerial has also created the titles Card Shark, Reigns: Beyond, Reigns: Three Kingdoms, Reigns: Her Majesty, Reigns: Game of Thrones, and Reigns. The Crush House was announced on April 3, 2024 and was released on August 9, 2024.

== Reception ==
Reception

Aggregate scores
Aggregator	Score
Metacritic	(PC) 73/100
OpenCritic	67% recommend

The Crush House received "mixed or average" reviews from critics, according to the review aggregation website Metacritic. Fellow review aggregator OpenCritic assessed that the game received strong approval, being recommended by 67% of critics.
