= Big City Greens season 4 =

Big City Greens
- Season 4
- Promotional poster
- Starring: Chris Houghton; Marieve Herington; Bob Joles; Artemis Pebdani; Zeno Robinson; Wendi McLendon-Covey; Anna Akana; Billy West
- No. of episodes: 30 (58 segments)

Release
- Original network: Disney Channel
- Original release: September 23, 2023 – August 9, 2025

Season chronology
- ← Previous; Season 3 Next → Season 5

The fourth season of the American animated television series Big City Greens, created by the Houghton Brothers (Chris and Shane Houghton), premiered on Disney Channel on September 23, 2023, and concluded on August 9, 2025. This season follows the adventures of the Green family as they now alternate between their Big City and Smalton homes while unaware that Chip Whistler is still alive and plotting revenge on them and all of Big City for banning him. This season also marks the official debut of Nick Mulligan, Nancy Green's deadbeat father (who appeared twice prior within flashbacks).

The series features the voices of Chris Houghton, Marieve Herington, Bob Joles, Artemis Pebdani, Zeno Robinson, Wendi McLendon-Covey, Anna Akana, and Billy West. Guest stars in this season include Michael Bolton, June Diane Raphael, Tom Green, Brad Marchand, Margo Martindale, Justin McElroy, Tim Meadows, Dean Norris, Ms. Pat, Tim Robinson, Paul Scheer, Amy Sedaris and Trevor Wallace.

== Production ==
Big City Greens was renewed for a fourth season on January 21, 2022, ahead of the third season's premiere, alongside a musical film. By October 2022, ten episodes had been completed. The season premiered on Disney Channel on September 23, 2023. Episodes for the fourth season did not air as constantly as previous seasons, with five episodes released in 2023 and seven in 2024, due to the crew focusing on finishing production of the movie which aired after episode 9.

== Episodes ==
The episodes are ordered by their original broadcast order, not their production order.

No. overall	No. in season	Title	Directed by	Written and storyboarded by	Story by	Original release date	Prod. code	U.S. viewers (millions)
81	1	"Truck Stopped"	Nick Sumida	Written by : Carson Montgomery, Raj Brueggemann & Sam King; Storyboarded by : Raj Brueggemann & Sam King	Carson Montgomery	September 23, 2023	401	0.15
81	1	"Jingled"	Nick Sumida	Written by : Laura Eichhorn, Gabi Rodea & Carl Edward Mongan; Storyboarded by : Gabi Rodea & Carl Edward Mongan	Laura Eichhorn	September 23, 2023	401	0.15
"Truck Stopped": Tilly and Cricket fight when Tilly can't decide what snack to get at the Truckee's truck stop while Bill gets anxious that he's late to Nancy's, accidentally leaving them behind. As Bill and Gramma turn around to get them, Tilly and Cricket realize that they must work together to make their decisions better and manage to finally decide on tater tots. It is only when they get back with Bill that they learn what happened. "Jingled": An agent named Bonnie Sparks from Big Jingle hires Tilly to work with them after seeing her tunes at the Green Family Farm stand. This was also due to the resignation of a jingle writer named Rick Razzle. Despite her successes there, Tilly realizes it is better to endulge in it for fun. This is thanks to Bill and Gramma who try to continue running the stand with their own mediocre songs after she leaves. Guest stars: Justin McElroy as Truckee's Mascot, Zehra Fazal as Test Audience Woman, Ryan Ridley as Test Audience Man, Amy Sedaris as Bonnie Spark, Michael Bolton as Rick Razzle
82	2	"Stand-Up Bill"	Kiana Khansmith	Written by : Nate Federman, Eric Brown & Stevie Borbolla; Storyboarded by : Eric Brown & Stevie Borbolla	Nate Federman	September 30, 2023	402	0.18
82	2	"Green Trial"	Kiana Khansmith	Written by : Mary Bronaugh, Jen Begeman & Amber Vucinich; Storyboarded by : Jen Begeman & Amber Vucinich	Mary Bronaugh	September 30, 2023	402	0.18
"Stand-Up Bill": Bill admires farming comedian Bill the Farmer, but is horrified to learn that he is a phony named Fredginald. He and Gramma oust his real self, but when Bill learns the truth behind his persona, he regrets it and helps him regain his reputation. Cricket gets roasted by a comedian named Jessica Burns and becomes sad. With Tilly's help, they get back at her by having her slip on a banana peel. "Green Trial": The Greens accuse Cricket of eating Nancy's strawberry cake while they were working. He invokes the "sibling code" to have Tilly represent him in a trial to prove his innocence. When it does not look good for Cricket, Tilly learns that he was trying to call Gabriella and proves his innocence. Nancy realizes that the true culprit is her own father Nick who has reentered their lives. Guest stars: Fred Tatasciore as Bouncer, Keith Ferguson as Fred the Farmer, Trevor Wallace as Emcee, Patricia "Ms. Pat" Williams as Jessica Burns, Billy West as Nick
83	3	"Bad Dad"	Nick Sumida	Written by : Nate Federman, Gabi Rodea & Carl Edward Mongan; Storyboarded by : Gabi Rodea & Carl Edward Mongan	Nate Federman	October 7, 2023	403	0.22
83	3	"Junk Junkie"	Nick Sumida	Written by : Laura Eichhorn, Raj Brueggemann & Sam King; Storyboarded by : Raj Brueggemann & Sam King	Laura Eichhorn	October 7, 2023	403	0.22
"Bad Dad": Nancy tries to find a job for Nick while he spends time with his grandchildren Cricket and Tilly, becoming close with them, despite them knowing full well that he is irresponsible. Nancy eventually gets a ticket for him to leave town, but Cricket and Tilly convince her to let him back into her life. She finally agrees to let him live with her on the condition he also do farm work. "Junk Junkie": After seeing a minor dip in profits, Bill becomes obsessed with wanting to provide for Cricket and Tilly and starts to collect junk to "provide" for them. Meanwhile, Gloria gets Gramma Alice hooked on a clean up show. When Bill collects too much junk, Alice uses her new skills to help him rescue the kids from being crushed by all the garbage and Bill learns to calm down. Guest stars: Tony Cavalero as Wayne, Lance Barber as Frank, Kyle Kinane as Dweezil, Jenny Yokobori as Serenity Spruce
84	4	"Handshaken"	Kiana Khansmith	Written by : Carson Montgomery, Eric Brown & Stevie Borbolla; Storyboarded by : Eric Brown & Stevie Borbolla	Carson Montgomery	October 14, 2023	404	0.15
84	4	"Coffee Mates"	Nick Sumida	Written by : Mary Bronaugh, Gabi Rodea & Carl Edward Mongan; Storyboarded by : Gabi Rodea & Carl Edward Mongan	Mary Bronaugh	October 14, 2023	404	0.15
"Handshaken": Cricket meets Joshua, a man with a notoriously firm and hard handshake. Cricket decides to empower his hand and successfully does so, beating Josh at his handshake. However, Cricket becomes power mad and starts to challenge everyone. Bill reveals himself to have an even more powerful handshake and teaches Cricket that just because you have power, does not mean you should flaunt it freely. "Coffee Mates": In order to balance her work and social life, Gloria decides to hire her friends the Kaitlyns (consisting of Keightlynne, Kaity-Lynn, and Caitlyn) as employees, but this causes her to shirk her responsibilities. Tilly believes she has a grey hair and thinks she is getting old, only to find that it was one of Bill's hairs. The Kaitlyns quit and Gloria finally decides to hire someone responsible named Jade to be the shift manager so that she can have personal time with the Kaitlyns. Guest stars: Peter Blomquist as Joshua, Darin De Paul as Good Ol' Joe, Tony Cavalero as Wayne, Nicole Byer as Caitlyn, Liza Koshy as Jade, Burl Moseley as Krelvin
85	5	"Iced"	Kiana Khansmith	Written by : Laura Eichhorn, Jen Begeman & Lydia Estepp; Storyboarded by : Jen Begeman & Lydia Estepp	Laura Eichhorn	October 21, 2023	405	0.23
85	5	"Chipped Off"	Nick Sumida	Written by : Julia Layton & Lacey Dyer, Raj Brueggemann & Sam King; Storyboarded by : Raj Brueggemann & Sam King	Julia Layton & Lacey Dyer	October 21, 2023	405	0.23
"Iced": Gramma Alice invites the whole family, sans Nick, to the hockey game. Nick follows anyway and gets into a fight with Alice. Bill tries to get a corn dog from an corn dog vendor that keeps evading him, Cricket and Nancy check out a Zamboni where its rider Toni won't let them near it, and Tilly teaches the players to be nice. All Hell breaks loose and the Greens are kicked out of the game. Alice and Nick make amends and accept each other as family and get everyone corn dogs. "Chipped Off": The Greens pay a visit to the wax museum. Chip Whistler is revealed to still be alive and drags his former employee Greg, who he refers to as Wholesome Greg, into the sewer to tell him his story. Surviving the helicopter crash, Chip discovered that everyone thinks he is dead due to Maria Media's news broadcast and that the Greens have moved on. He tries to reinvent himself as "Norm Alguy" and tries to make a new life for himself where he becomes an office worker and dates a girl named Babe, but soon begins to find his new life boring and also had an interaction with look-alikes of the Green family. He decides to once again pursue the Greens in secret as well as plan revenge on Big City. When Greg asks about the scar on his face, Chip stated that it was from an incident involving a rat. Guest stars: Brad Marchand as Mikey LeBeouf, Tim Meadows as Chet Handsomeman, Dean Norris as Zamboni Toni, Tom Green as Corndog Vendor, Paul Scheer as Chip Whistler, Raven-Symoné as Maria Media, Andy Richter as Mayor Hansock, Amy Hill as Crouton, June Diane Raphael as Babe
86	6	"Internetted"	Kiana Khansmith	Written by : Nate Federman, Eric Brown & Stevie Borbolla; Storyboarded by : Eric Brown & Stevie Borbolla	Nate Federman	April 6, 2024	406	0.12
86	6	"Guiding Gregly"	Nick Sumida	Written by : Nate Federman, Gabi Rodea & Carl Edward Mongan; Storyboarded by : Gabi Rodea & Carl Edward Mongan	Nate Federman	April 6, 2024	406	0.12
"Internetted": Tilly wants to know what happened to her favorite ice cream and decides to search the internet. She falls down a literal rabbit hole thanks to a rabbit named Miss Information and finds too many falsities. She eventually breaks free and learns from Bill that the ice cream was recalled due to the gumballs in them. Despite Tilly expressing doubt, Bill reminds her that he will always look out for her. "Guiding Gregly": Gregly is upset that he has no real friends, so Cricket and Remy try to change his attitude towards everything. Gregly is still unhappy and Tilly warns that his anger could build up. This ends up happening and Cricket apologizes for trying to change him. Instead, they realize that Gregly is better off hanging out with old people, which is what he ends up doing as they share the same interests as him. Guest stars: Tim Robinson as Gregly, Nicole Byer as Andromeda, Caldwell Turner as Itchaboi, Kira Buckland as Agent Information, Stephanie Sheh as Kiki, Luke Lowe as Benny, Lamar Woods as Wheezy
87	7	"Family Tree"	Kiana Khansmith	Written by : Nate Federman, Jen Begeman & Lydia Estepp; Storyboarded by : Jen Begeman & Lydia Estepp	Nate Federman	April 13, 2024	407	0.26
87	7	"Unguarded"	Kiana Khansmith	Written by : Laura Eichhorn, Eric Brown & Stevie Borbolla; Storyboarded by : Eric Brown & Stevie Borbolla	Laura Eichhorn	April 13, 2024	407	0.26
"Family Tree": Bill wants to beat the traffic back to Big City, but Tilly instead wants to sit in a tree. Bill becomes agitated and orders Cricket, Nancy, and Gramma Alice to get her down, but they all end up joining her. Tilly finally begs Bill to listen to her and he climbs the tree, finding beauty in it just like the rest of the family. They all sit together and watch the sunrise. "Unguarded": Vasquez is shocked to learn that Remy does not require him to watch him to a local event. This sends him into a spiral and the Remingtons hire a therapist named Dr. Maya Bloom. Vasquez explains how he was hired by the Remingtons to watch over Remy after he broke from the Order of the Fang upon being unable to do a mission at their house with Viper Fang back when Vasquez operated as Tiger Fang. He goes to check on Remy, but learns he is okay. Remy tells him later that he still wants him around and they hug. Guest stars: Danny Trejo as Vasquez, Lorraine Toussaint as Rashida Remington, Colton Dunn as Russell Remington, Betsy Sodaro as Community Sue, Joe Manganiello as Viper Fang, Margo Martindale as Dr. Maya Bloom
88	8	"Concrete Jungle"	Nick Sumida	Written by : Carson Montgomery, Raj Brueggemann & Sam King; Storyboarded by : Raj Brueggemann & Sam King	Carson Montgomery	April 20, 2024	408	0.15
88	8	"Starter Pack"	Nick Sumida	Written by : Carson Montgomery, Gabi Rodea & Carl Edward Mongan; Storyboarded by : Gabi Rodea & Carl Edward Mongan	Carson Montgomery	April 20, 2024	408	0.15
"Concrete Jungle": In a parody of David Attenborough's nature documentaries, an omniscient narrator covers Gramma Alice battling off construction workers, Cricket and Remy battling teens to get their food, Gloria getting shoes from a dumpster, Tilly crossing the road by making herself tall, and Bill buying eggs at the Farmer's Market and protecting them. In the end, everyone comes home to eat dinner and talk about their day. "Starter Pack": Remy show Cricket his Galaxu card collection (a parody of Pokémon cards). Cricket ends up finding the rarest card, a Starmadillo, and Remy immediately becomes jealous, especially since Cricket shows little care with protecting the card. Remy resolves to steal it, resulting in Cricket angrily losing his trust with him and Vasquez and Gramma Alice battling for their respective kin. In the end, Remy realizes his friendship is more important and relents. Guest stars: Carson Montgomery as Narrator, Cree Summer as Claire, Will Akana as Galaxu Trainer
89	9	"Dollar Sense"	Raj Brueggemann	Written by : Carson Montgomery, Jen Begeman & Lydia Estepp; Storyboarded by : Jen Begeman & Lydia Estepp	Carson Montgomery	April 27, 2024	409	0.18
89	9	"True Cawing"	Kiana Khansmith	Written by : Vanita Borwankar, Jen Begeman & Lydia Estepp; Storyboarded by : Jen Begeman & Lydia Estepp	Vanita Borwankar	April 27, 2024	409	0.18
"Dollar Sense": Russell and Rashida realize that Remy is a "money dummy" and cut him off, giving him one dollar to spend. Remy decides to take a loan out and buy BcRibs (a parody of the McRib), so that their value goes up, but it wasn't long before he becomes greedy and vows to make an endless fortune. When it soon becomes a permanent menu item and Remy finds out his entire home will be repossessed if he does not pay back the loan, Remy is forced to sell his stock to the zoo. He ends up with only 75 cents (which he splits evenly with Cricket and Tilly), but his parents are happy to see he has learned how money works. "True Cawing": Cricket, Tilly, and Gramma Alice refuse to go statue touring with Bill and head home. Bill befriends a murder of crows and adopts them as his new family, only to find himself in a similar situation that the other Greens were in. Tilly and Gramma help Cricket find a new hobby and when Bill gets in trouble, Cricket finds that he loves causing destruction. He rescues Bill and the Greens make up. Guest stars: Rich Sommer as Bank Boss, Dan Fogler as Burger Clown CEO, Raven-Symoné as Maria Media, Tim Robinson as Gregly, Colton Dunn as Russell Remington, Lorraine Toussaint as Rashida Remington, Stephanie Sheh as Kiki, Lamarr Woods as Weezie, Luke Lowe as Benny, Andy Daly as Officer Keys
90	10	"Fortune Feller"	Kiana Khansmith	Written by : Carson Montgomery, Stevie Borbolla, & Eric Brown; Storyboarded by : Stevie Borbolla & Eric Brown	Carson Montgomery	October 5, 2024	TBA	0.11
90	10	"No Escape"	Kiana Khansmith	Written by : Lacey Dyer, Julia Layton, Stevie Borbolla, & Eric Brown; Storyboarded by : Stevie Borbolla & Eric Brown	Lacey Dyer & Julia Layton	October 5, 2024	TBA	0.11
"Fortune Feller": While at the Smallton County Fair, the Green Family come across a fortune teller machine named Zalmar who predicts that Tilly and Nancy will find something new while Cricket will get stinky slapped. As Nancy goes to a balloon-popping game run by her father Nick, Tilly and Bill go to Elrod's Exotic Animals where Elrod wrestles with an alligator named Arthur while Cricket works to avoid getting stinky slapped. "No Escape": The Greens go to visit a Croblins Halloween escape room. They each enter their respective escape rooms. What they don't know is that the tenant of the escape room is actually Wholesome Greg in disguise as part of Chip Whistler's plot to have his revenge on the Greens. He starts to mess with them by stating that only one of them can push the button to free themselves while the other rooms have their doors locked, and gaslighting them into thinking Cricket betrayed him out of selfishness, breaking their spirits and driving Cricket insane until he remembers the Greens work together, allowing him to escape and free everyone. Guest stars: Paul Scheer as Chip Whistler, Shane Houghton as Wholesome Greg, Willy Roberts as Elrod, Joe Hanna as Zalmar, Tony Cavalero as Wayne, Tim Baltz as Ernie, Kyle Kinane as Dweezil
91	11	"Turkey Trouble"	Nick Sumida	Written by : Laura Eichhorn, Raj Brueggemann, & Sam King; Storyboarded by : Raj Brueggemann & Sam King	Laura Eichhorn	November 16, 2024	411	0.08
91	11	"Hard Bargain"	Nick Sumida	Written by : Nate Federman, Gabi Rodea, & Carl Edward Mongan; Storyboarded by : Gabi Rodea & Carl Edward Mongan	Nate Federman	November 16, 2024	411	0.08
"Turkey Trouble": On Thanksgiving, the Greens are having Thanksgiving dinner with Nancy who is doing most of the cooking. Tilly invents a new game called "Hobble Gobble Go" where one has to hobble to get turkey crafts. Alice and Nick start to become competitive. Meanwhile, Bill and Cricket look to find a replacement turkey when Cricket accidentally destroys the turkey. "Hard Bargain": After having a pancake breakfast, the Greens look for a replacement maple syrup bottle following Cricket's latest sugar rush. They pay a visit to the Smallton Thrift Barn. Upon arrival, Cricket breaks loose from his leash and drinks some aged soda as Bill tries to keep him in line, Gramma Alice sees a knitting machine, Nick and Tilly encounter a doll that appears to be haunted, and Nancy finds the maple syrup bottle while encountering the Smallton Thrift Barn's owner Dorothy. Guest stars: Shane Houghton as Turkey, Brooke Dillman as Patti, Tony Cavelero as Wayne, Darin De Paul as Good Ol' Wayne, Kimberly Brooks as Tracy, Armen Taylor as Trey, Debra Wilson as Dorothy
92	12	"Dream Tree"	Nick Sumida	Written by : Nate Federman, Carl Edward Mongan, & Gabi Rodea; Storyboarded by : Carl Edward Mongan & Gabi Rodea	Nate Federman	December 7, 2024	412	0.13
92	12	"Blue Greens"	Kiana Khansmith	Written by : Lacy Dyer, Julia Layton, Jen Begeman, & Lydia Estepp; Storyboarded by : Jen Begeman & Lydia Estepp	Lacy Dyer & Julia Layton	December 7, 2024	412	0.13
"Dream Tree": As Bill takes his family to Smallton for Christmas, Nancy has noticed that Bill didn't bring a Christmas tree as he states that he is waiting for a sign from the Spirit of Christmas to guide him to the right Christmas tree. Having slept on the way to Smallton, Cricket mentions that he had a dream about the awesome Christmas tree as Bill takes him along to find the Christmas tree from Cricket's dream. Meanwhile, Tilly takes the others Christmas caroling and wonders why Nick refuses to sing along. "Blue Greens": Waking up one morning, Cricket finds that Tilly is feeling ennui. The ennui soon spreads to Bill and Gramma Alice. Meanwhile, Gloria gets stuck in the basement when trying to move the dresser that she plans to sell online as she works to get out of the basement when nobody can hear her. Guest stars: Scott Aukerman as Radio DJ
93	13	"Hullabaloo'd"	Kiana Khansmith	Written by : Laura Eichhorn, Eric Brown, & Stevie Borbolla; Storyboarded by : Eric Brown & Stevie Borbolla	Laura Eichhorn	March 15, 2025 (Note: This episode first premiered on Disney+ in Spain on February 5, 2025, ahead of its official air date.)	414	N/A
93	13	"Jaded"	Nick Sumida	Written by : Laura Eichhorn, Raj Brueggemann, & Sam Spina; Storyboarded by : Raj Brueggemann & Sam Spina	Laura Eichhorn	March 15, 2025	414	N/A
"Hullabaloo'd": During a cold day in Smallton, Alice tells the story of an Old Man Winter-type figure called the Hullabaloo who is said to be behind a deep freeze. They must wear mask and shout loudly to repel the Hullabaloo or else there will be a permanent winter. The rest of the Greens are not convinced as Andromeda ropes Tilly into running a series of tests where they think Wayne is a monster in disguise. "Jaded": Jade has proven herself to be a valuable employee at Gloria + Green Café. After Gramma Alice compliments Jade's work, Gloria feels useless as the customers want service from Jade more. Gloria puts in a suggestion box which leads to a series of events that causes Jade to be handed the manager position. Meanwhile, Cricket and Tilly compete in a game of pickleball against some elderly woman named Phyllis and Olga, who turn out to be very experienced. Guest stars: Nicole Byer as Andromeda, Armen Taylor as Trey, Tony Cavalero as Wayne, Nika Futterman as Olga, John Early as Alexander, Liza Koshy as Jade
94	14	"Dog Proof"	Kiana Khansmith	Written by : Vanita Borwankar, Jen Begeman & Lydia Estepp; Storyboarded by : Jen Begeman & Lydia Estepp	Vanita Borwankar	March 22, 2025	413	N/A
94	14	"Cricket Control"	Nick Sumida	Written by : Laura Eichhorn, Raj Brueggemann, & Sam Spina; Storyboarded by : Raj Brueggemann & Sam Spina	Laura Eichhorn	March 22, 2025	413	N/A
"Dog Proof": Phoenix has not been eating the new dog food that was given to her causing Cricket to show her how to eat it. Gloria stumbles upon this causing Cricket to keep her from exposing it. Meanwhile, Bill, Tilly, and Gramma Alice visit a painting studio taught by an artist named Michael Angelo, and Bill is suspicious when Michael gives everyone the exact same compliment. "Cricket Control": While wanting to have some alone time, Bill keeps getting disturbed by Cricket. Tech salesman Bart Haggelspiel shows up and sells Bill a small A.I. device called Parent Plus that helps deal with rowdy children. Meanwhile, Gramma Alice and Tilly try out a new restaurant called FÜD where the customers are forced to cater to their own needs. Guest stars: Liza Koshy as Jade, Andy Daly as Officer Keys, Raven-Symoné as Maria Media, Daran Norris as Michael Angelo, Tom Gammill as Doug Perkins, David Kaye as Parent Plus, David Brown as Counter Employee, Roger Craig Smith as Bart Hagglespiel
95	15	"April Fool"	Nick Sumida	Written by : Nate Federman, Gabi Rodea & Carl Edward Mongan; Storyboarded by : Gabi Rodea & Carl Edward Mongan	Nate Federman	March 29, 2025	415	N/A
95	15	"Good Grief"	Kiana Khansmith	Written by : Phillip Walker, Eric Brown, & Stevie Borbolla; Storyboarded by : Eric Brown & Stevie Borbolla	Phillip Walker	March 29, 2025	415	N/A
"April Fool": On April Fool's Day, Cricket notes that this is the day that he and Gabriella get to prank each other. When Cricket gets pranker's block, he enlists Remy to help him overcome it as Remy does various attempts that involve enlisting some people to prank Cricket. Meanwhile, Gramma Alice tries to prank Gloria. "Good Grief": While visiting the pet store, Bill is reluctant to take a pet home for Tilly upon recalling his pet worm that he lost. When they take a fish named Cougho home, it ends up dying but Bill hides it from Tilly because of how much she loves the fish, before he flushes it down the toilet and works to help Tilly overcome her grief. Meanwhile, Cricket and Remy get inspired by the film "Wacky Wednesday" as they pretend to switch bodies until Officer Keys considers what they are doing a theft offense. Guest stars: Nikki Castillo as Gabriella, Jessica McKenna as Selena, Liza Koshy as Jade, Andy Daly as Officer Keys, Stephanie Sheh as Kiki, Lamar Woods as Wheezie, Kari Wahlgren as Manager
96	16	"Evil Family"	Nick Sumida	Written by : Nate Federman, Raj Brueggemann, & Sam Spina; Storyboarded by : Raj Brueggemann & Sam Spina	Nate Federman	April 5, 2025	416	N/A
96	16	"Greens Underground"	Nick Sumida	Written by : Laura Eichhorn, Gabi Rodea & Carl Edward Mongan; Storyboarded by : Gabi Rodea & Carl Edward Mongan	Laura Eichhorn	April 5, 2025	416	N/A
"Evil Family": While still operating as "Norm Alguy" in front of Babe, Chip Whistler sets up a base in the sewers with Wholesome Greg's help. Noting that the Greens function as a family unit, Chip plans to put together his own family. He starts by hiring the criminals Bella and Bash into breaking into the Remington estate where they even trick Vasquez into getting a "bodyguard license". After Remy drives Bella and Bash off, the Remington estate is also raided by Viper Fang who has arrived with Order of the Fang members Spider Fang and Wolf Fang as Chip also targets Remy, who thinks the invasion is a test set up by Vasquez to train his survival skills until he learns the truth. "Greens Underground": Now that Chip has Viper Fang, Spider Fang, and Wolf Fang working for him and Remy has retreated to the panic room with an exhausted Vasquez, the Greens are warned about Chip's return. They inform Officer Keys who is busy helping to find Mayor Hansock's plush animal Schmooky as he plans to apprehend Chip if he finds him. In the meantime, the Greens enter the witness protection program and move into the suburbs under different alias like Cricket as Eddie, Bill as Darryl, Tilly as Helen, and Gramma Alice as Darryl's sister Aunt Roxy. To their surprise while laying low in their aliases, they discover that one of their neighbors is Gloria's parents, who immediately see through their disguises forcing them to relocate. Eventually when Cricket hears the police has cancelled the search for Chip, Cricket realizes they can't hide any longer and decides to no longer fear Chip, and the Greens go back to Big City promising they will be ready to defeat Chip once and for all. Guest stars: Paul Scheer as Chip Whistler, June Diane Raphael as Babe, Shane Houghton as Wholesome Greg, Joe Mangianello as Viper Fang, Paget Brewster as Spider Fang, Jeffrey Dean Morgan as Wolf Fang, Lauren Lapkus as Bella, Thomas Middleditch as Bash, Andy Daly as Officer Keys, Andy Richter as Mayor Hansock, Keone Young as Mr. Sato, Amy Hill as Mrs. Sato, Dash Lewis as Officer Tommy
97	17	"Freebie Frenzy"	Kiana Khansmith	Written by : Laura Eichhorn, Jen Begeman & Lydia Estepp; Storyboarded by : Jen Begeman & Lydia Estepp	Laura Eichhorn	April 12, 2025	417	N/A
97	17	"TP'd"	Kiana Khansmith	Written by : Carson Montgomery, Jen Begeman & Lydia Estepp; Storyboarded by : Jen Begeman & Lydia Estepp	Carson Montgomery	April 12, 2025	417	N/A
"Freebie Frenzy": At the Farmer's Market, the Greens find that some of the stands are giving out free samples as Cricket and Gramma Alice take part in collecting every sample to make a sandwich, before they meet a bread vendor named Braelyn who tells them long stories about bread. Bill allows his customers to take part in his free samples and comes cross one customer who constantly samples the other tomato products without buying anything. Meanwhile, Tilly befriends two rats that she found at the Farmer's Market that she names Chad and Napoleon. "TP'd": In Smalton, Cricket and Nancy are dining at Patti's when they learn that an elderly man named Saul once pranked Smallton by flooding it with soap bubbles. Wanting to outdo Saul, Cricket and Nancy come up with the idea to TP all of Smallton. Once that is done overnight, Frank notes that the people responsible have to pick it up as Trey Hicks takes the credit and Tilly convinced the town that Cricket and Nancy had nothing to do with it, causing Cricket and Nancy to plan a bigger TPing plot which also gets ruined. Back in Big City, Brett points out to Bill that he is talking to his chicks as Bill admits that he misses his kids. He attempts to bond with Remy after picking him since his parents and Vasquez are busy. Guest stars: Matty Matheson as Sauce Boss, Mary Faber as Braelyn, Shane Houghton as Vendor #1, Roger Craig Smith as Vendor #2, Armen Taylor as Trey Hicks, Kimberly Brooks as Tracy Hicks, Tony Calavero as Wayne, Booke Dillman as Patti, Lance Barber as Frank, Colton Dunn as Brett Eze, Frank Welker as Saul, Tim Baltz as Ernie, Dee Bradley Baker as Beans
98	18	"Chocolate Santa"	Kiana Khansmith	Written by : Mike Trapp, Jen Begeman & Lydia Estepp; Storyboarded by : Jen Begeman & Lydia Estepp	Mike Trapp	April 19, 2025 (Note: This episode first premiered on Disney+ in the United States on April 16, 2025, ahead of its official air date.)	418	N/A
98	18	"Meadow Mania"	Nick Sumida	Written by : Laura Eichhorn, Raj Brueggemann, & Sam Spina; Storyboarded by : Raj Brueggemann & Sam Spina	Laura Eichhorn	April 19, 2025	418	N/A
"Chocolate Santa": In the middle of summer, Cricket finds that Bill has hid a Chocolate Santa from him on a daily basis by slicing it think and that Bill does not trust Cricket due to a lack of restraint causing him to enlist Tilly to restrain Tilly while he is away. Cricket accidentally eats the whole Chocolate Santa and enlists Tilly to help him find a replacement before his dad finds out and forbits him from getting a Chocolate Santa of his own again. Meanwhile, Alice is taken to "Upgrades" by Bill where a salesman with Tabitha helps find her a new leg. "Meadow Mania": While in Smalton for the weekend, Gramma Alice, Cricket, and Tilly find that a bunch of "Mead-Heads" are in town. The Mead-Heads are a group of hippies that obsess over natural country life and are in Smalton for a festival. Nancy hides her obsession for the festival. When it is being held across from Nancy's house, Gramma Alice and Tilly do everything they can to sabotage the festival while dealing with the meadow enthuisiatic lead Mead-Head Fawn. Meanwhile, Cricket and Nick sees the environment-friendly cars that the Mead-Heads drive and plan to charge them for parking. Guest stars: Mary Faber as Tabitha and Fawn, Clancy Brown as Chocolate Santa, Brooke Dillman as Patti
99	19	"Split Decision"	Kiana Khansmith	Written by : Carson Montgomery, Eric Brown, & Stevie Borbolla; Storyboarded by : Eric Brown & Stevie Borbolla	Carson Montgomery	April 26, 2025	419	N/A
99	19	"Skipped Over"	Kiana Khansmith	Written by : John D'Arco, Eric Brown, & Stevie Borbolla; Storyboarded by : Eric Brown & Stevie Borbolla	John D'Arco	April 26, 2025	419	N/A
"Split Decision": At Big City Community Center, Cricket gets a letter from Gabriella as everyone there has supported "Crick-iella". He finds on the letter that Gabriella wants to break up with him and finds that she has lost interest in pranking and become a goth. He tries to become a goth so that they can still be together. Meanwhile, Remy wants to become part of the yearbook legacy pictures as he tries to find something for Community Sue and Tilly to photograph him doing much to their dismay. In the end, Cricket accepts Gabriella's changes and they break up, but promise to remain on good terms. "Skipped Over": As Bill shows his kids how he was able to skip rocks over the water, Cricket manages to outdo him in that. This causes Bill go up against Cricket in different competitions, which Cricket manages to keep winning at. Eventually, Cricket is outmatched by Bill in a wrestling match and admits he taught him everything he knows, and Bill accepts the fact that Cricket outdoing him means he's growing up and should be proud of him. Meanwhile, Nancy looks for a baking dish she wants to make use of as Nick reminds her that she gave it to Trey and Tracy when she gave them her casserole as she works to get it back from them. Guest stars: Betsy Sodaro as Community Sue, Nikki Castillo as Gabriella, Tim Robinson as Gregly, Stephanie Sheh as Kiki, Lamar Woods as Wheezie, Luke Lowe as Benny, Kimberly Brooks as Tracy Hicks, Armen Taylor as Trey Hicks, Darin De Paul as Good Ol' Joe
100	20	"One Hundred"	Nick Sumida	Written by : Shane Houghton, Gabi Rodea, Carl Edward Mongan, Raj Brueggemann, & Sam Spina; Storyboarded by : Gabi Rodea, Carl Edward Mongan, Raj Brueggemann & Sam Spina	Shane Houghton	May 3, 2025	420	N/A
The Greens learn that their milestone 100th adventure is coming up as they each plan to make it their best. Cricket and Remy do a second attempt to launch a chicken into outer space that involves one of Gwendolyn Zapp's inventions. Tilly and Gramma Alice attempt to contact Ernest Green's spirit with help from a psychic named Archemorus. Bill finds a package that was delivered to the wrong address. It was revealed in the end that Cricket and Tilly made up their adventures and they host a barbecue for their neighbors instead, while the package Bill delivered turned out to be for Chip Whistler and Babe, containing the last thing they need before exacting his revenge on Big City. Guest stars: Cheri Oteri as Gwendolyn Zapp, Mark Hamill as Archemorus, Raj Brueggemann as Worm Guy, Shane Houghton as Chicken, Tim Blake Nelson as Ernest Green, Paul Scheer as Chip Whistler, June Diane Raphael as Babe, Raven-Symoné as Maria Media, Tim Robinson as Gregly
101	21	"Chip's Revenge"	Kiana Khansmith	Written by : Carson Montgomery, Nate Federman, Jen Begeman, Lydia Estepp, Eric Brown & Stevie Borbolla; Storyboarded by : Jen Begeman, Lydia Estepp, Eric Brown & Stevie Borbolla	Carson Montgomery & Nate Federman	June 7, 2025	421	N/A
In his revenge plot on the Greens, Chip Whistler has Viper Fang, Spider Fang, and Wolf Fang hijack a cargo ship. Then an explosion of rotten produce happens all over Big City. Inserting himself as Mayor Hansock's new assistant upon returning Schmooky to him, Chip Whistler in his "Norm Alguy" alias frames the Greens for causing the explosion because the produce has stickers of their farm logo. This causes an angry mob to form and pursue the Greens as Remy and Vasquez attempt to save them. Even when they are "rescued" by Officer Keys and taken to a newly-built island that Hansock's statue is on, Chip reveals himself as he admits he started the produce-cano, and the package Bill delivered to them contained the stickers that were used to frame them, and the final part of his plan is to use the recently-built statue of himself beneath Hansock's statue to further his revenge on Big City by demolishing everything and killing everyone living there. Now the Greens must come together to defeat Chip and his allies and save Big City. Guest stars: Andy Richter as Mayor Hansock, Paul Scheer as Chip Whistler, Joe Mangianello as Viper Fang, Paget Brewster as Spider Fang, Jeffrey Dean Morgan as Wolf Fang, Eric Bauza as Barge Captain, Marc Evan Jackson as Mob Leader, Shane Houghton as Wholesome Greg, Andy Daly as Officer Keys, Raven-Symoné as Maria Media, June Diane Raphael as Babe
102	22	"Charity Case"	Nick Sumida	Written by : Laura Eichhorn, Raj Brueggemann, & Ariel Vracin-Harrell; Storyboarded by : Raj Brueggemann & Ariel Vracin-Harrell	Laura Eichhorn	June 14, 2025	422	N/A
102	22	"Like Father"	Nick Sumida	Written by : Carson Montgomery, Gabi Rodea, & Carl Edward Mongan; Storyboarded by : Gabi Rodea & Carl Edward Mongan	Carson Montgomery	June 14, 2025	422	N/A
"Charity Case": While watching a marathon of Croblins, Cricket and Tilly see on television an advertisement about saving moths that was narrated by former sitcome actress Debbie Upton. They plan to collect enough money to donate to the cause and one of Tilly's plans to get more money leads to her getting busted by Officer Keys. Meanwhile, Bill fails at fixing the refrigerator causing Gramma Alice to call a refrigerator repairman as Bill questions his importance to the family, deliberately annoying the repairman in the process until he is forced to leave. "Like Father": After Cricket helps Bill put together a pool table, Tilly notes that he has become more like their father. Noting that he now has caught a case of "Billness" and worries he could turn into Bill as a result, Cricket enlists Tilly to help him get rid of it. Meanwhile at Gloria + Green Café, Gloria and Gramma Alice argue over their respective jobs, with Gloria running the café's counter and Alice handling the café's accounting. The two swap jobs to see which of them has their job the hardest. In the end, Bill is okay with Cricket taking after him and reassures he will still be himself, while Gloria and Gramma realize their different jobs are as equally hard as anyone else's. Guest stars: Andy Daly as Officer Keys, Colton Dunn as Brett, Rich Sommers as Bank Boss, Carla Gugino as Debbie Upton, Liza Koshy as Jade, Carl Edward Mongan as Bhab, Gabi Rodea as Indecisive Guy, Tom Gammill as Doug Perkins
103	23	"Locked In"	Nick Sumida	Written by : John D'Arco, Gabi Rodea, & Carl Edward Mongan; Storyboarded by : Gabi Rodea & Carl Edward Mongan	John D'Arco	June 21, 2025	423	N/A
103	23	"City Wayne"	Kiana Khansmith	Written by : Nate Federman, Eric Brown & Stevie Borbolla; Storyboarded by : Eric Brown & Stevie Borbolla	Nate Federman	June 21, 2025	423	N/A
"Locked In": At the Community Center, Community Sue is hosting a locked in even as a new kid named Jagger takes part in it. While Kiki, Benny, and Wheezy have heard things about Jagger, Cricket, Tilly, and Remy go to befriend him as he is not up to befriending them. Community Sue then has the kids partake in a test at the Rope Bridge of Introspection where the truth about Jagger becomes known. "City Wayne": While leaving from after visiting Nancy and Nick in Smalton, Cricket and Tilly run into Wayne at the train station where he states that he always wanted to visit Big City. They take him on a trip to Big City. Wayne gets distracted by different things as Cricket and Tilly help him out with comical and disastrous results. Meanwhile, Nancy wants Nick to try his hand at making lunch for her as he tries to sabotage the dish with help from Trey. Guest stars: Stephanie Sheh as Kiki, Betsy Sodaro as Community Sue, Lamar Woods as Wheezy, Tim Robinson as Gregly, Nicole Byer as Andromeda, Luke Lowe as Benny, Tony Hawk as Jagger, Armen Taylor as Trey, Tony Cavalero as Wayne, Paul Rust as Little Big City Employee
104	24	"Saxon Saxability"	Nick Sumida	Written by : Mike Trapp, Raj Brueggemann, & Ariel Vracin-Harrell; Storyboarded by : Raj Brueggemann & Ariel Vracin-Harrell	Mike Trapp	June 28, 2025	424	N/A
104	24	"Remy Dilemmy"	Kiana Khansmith	Written by : Laura Eichhorn, Jen Begeman, & Lydia Estepp; Storyboarded by : Jen Begeman & Lydia Estepp	Laura Eichhorn	June 28, 2025	424	N/A
"Saxon Saxability": As Cricket and Tilly play make-believe with Saxon in a period drama with Lord Argyle and Lady Mopsley, Bill comes in and has Tilly pull the weeds. Cricket continues without her and has his own toys pose as Saxon's friends. Seeing this happening from outside, Tilly just cuts down the weeds and returns to Cricket and Saxon to make sure they aren't make-believing the wrong way. "Remy Dilemmy": Today is Remy's half-birthday with Cricket and Tilly in attendance. Noting that Remy has been hanging out more with Cricket, Tilly, and Vasquez, Russell and Rashida plan to spend the day with him. While unfamiliar with what Remy likes, Russell and Rashida keep Cricket and Tilly's contacts on their phones to keep in touch with them. Things go well on their outing with Remy until it reaches a breaking point where Russell and Rashida fire Vasquez. Guest stars: Darin De Paul as Cowboy, David Tennant as Lord Argyle, Dan Stevens as Saxon, Ray Chase as Sir Velociraptor, Jennifer Veal as Lady Mopsley, Shane Houghton as Shoesley, Colton Dunn as Russell, Lorraine Toussaint as Rashida
105	25	"Swashbuckled"	Nick Sumida	Written by : Carson Montgomery, Gabi Rodea & Carl Edward Mongan; Storyboarded by : Gabi Rodea, Carl Edward Mongan, & Amber Vucinich	Carson Montgomery	July 5, 2025	425	N/A
105	25	"Nick Scouts"	Kiana Khansmith	Written by : Mike Trapp, Eric Brown & Stevie Borbolla; Storyboarded by : Eric Brown & Stevie Borbolla	Mike Trapp	July 5, 2025	425	N/A
"Swashbuckled": Gramma Alice has ordered a new feather for her hat which she mentions to Cricket and Tilly. Unfortunately, her package was stolen off her porch. The same thing has happened to Gloria, Brett, and Mr. Gregorian. As Officer Keys can't help them because his equipment was stolen by porch pirates. Gramma Alice enlists Gloria, Brett, and Mr. Gregorian to help hunt down the porch pirates. Meanwhile, Cricket tries to befriend Gramma Alice's pet cat Dirtbag. "Nick Scouts": After the TV shorts out, Nick is visited by the Bramblebee Scouts selling cookies which he tries to turn away only for Nancy to intervene. Thinking that he can make money from the cookies that are sold, Nick enlists Cricket and Tilly to form their own scout group so that he can use the money they raised to purchase a new TV. With Wayne and Lupita in their group, Nick finds that the scout group has to do more than selling cookies. Guest stars: Andy Daly as Officer Keys, Jim Cummings as Porch Pirate Captain, Maurice LaMarche as Mr. Gregorian, Colton Dunn as Brett, Lance Barber as TV Announcer, Frank Welker as Saul, Charley Rowan McCann as Bramblebee Scout, Tony Cavalero as Wayne, Rylee Alazraqui as Lupita
106	26	"Flexed"	Nick Sumida	Written by : Laura Eichhorn, Raj Brueggemann, & Ariel Vracin-Harrell; Storyboarded by : Raj Brueggemann & Ariel Vracin-Harrell	Laura Eichhorn	July 12, 2025	426	N/A
106	26	"After Dark"	Kiana Khansmith	Written by : Nate Federman, Jen Begeman & Lydia Estepp; Storyboarded by : Jen Begeman & Lydia Estepp	Nate Federman	July 12, 2025	426	N/A
"Flexed": The Greens attend the opening of the new gym called Fit 'n' Flex and meets its owner Jim Owner who shows them the amenities that the Fit 'n' Flex has to offer. Bill is unfamiliar with some of the workout equipment there and fakes having knowledge of them so that Cricket can see that he is an expert at them with comical results. Meanwhile, Tilly runs amuck through the gym while Gramma Alice trains Gloria. As a result, Cricket and Bill destroy all the gym machines, causing the Greens and Gloria to be kicked out by Jim and billed for the damage. "After Dark": Cricket and Remy find an ad for a drone show that will be occurring at night. Unfortunately, Cricket's curfew is when the street lights first come on. After bringing it up to Bill, he tells Cricket that he can't be held accountable if Cricket is far away. If he is not home five minutes after the street lights come on, Cricket must do the dishes for a whole month. Cricket comes up with a loophole that has him and Remy doing something to cause a citywide blackout as Bill figures out what Cricket has done and learns how to get even with Cricket after meeting the same friendly electrician that Cricket met. Guest stars: Zach Hadel as Concerned Gym Bro, Michael Cusack as Jim Owner, Colton Dunn as Russell and Electrician
107	27	"Spinned Off"	Nick Sumida	Written by : Mike Trapp, Gabi Rodea & Carl Edward Mongan; Storyboarded by : Gabi Rodea, Carl Edward Mongan	Mike Trapp	July 19, 2025	427	N/A
107	27	"Broken Karted"	Kiana Khansmith	Written by : Kenny Byerly, Eric Brown & Stevie Borbolla; Storyboarded by : Eric Brown & Stevie Borbolla	Kenny Byerly	July 19, 2025	427	N/A
"Spinned Off": Gwendolyn Zapp holds a presentation for all of Big City. She reveals her company's latest invention called Big Tech Video which is an A.I. drone system that will scan anyone and present a TV show version of anyone. This is tested on Vasquez where it shows a TV sitcom where he watches over Remy and his two clones. Then it shows other projects revolving around Gloria, Kiki, Weezie, Benny, Doug Perkins, Maria Media, Andromeda, and Community Sue as well as a drone being dispatched to Smallton where it scans Frank. For each show, nobody seems to be impressed with it. "Broken Karted": Smallton is having its go-kart derby. Hector does not want to ride Lupita's go-kart or else he'll lose and Sunday will leave him. Lupita tries to ride the go-kart herself and ends up getting injured. With Lupita bandaged up in toilet paper by Frank, Tilly decides to ride the go-kart herself in the race as Cricket starts to act as the voice of reason. Though Tilly soon discovers that Lupita's go-kart was not properly built well. Meanwhile, Nancy discovers that Trey and Tracy have entered their triplets in the go-kart. They gloat about their triplets' advantages much to the annoyance of Nancy. Guest stars: Cheri Oteri as Gwendolyn Zapp, Raven-Symoné as Maria Media, Stephanie Sheh as Kiki, Luke Lowe as Benny, Lamar Woods as Weezie, Andy Daly as Officer Keys, Tom Gammill as Doug Perkins, Colton Dunn as Brett and Announcer, Betsy Sodaro as Community Sue, Vladimir Caamaño as Juan Pablo, Nicole Byer as Andromeda, Dana Snyder as Murgle-Purr, Lance Barber as Frank, Rylee Alazraqui as Lupita, Harvey Guillén as Hector, Ali Stroker as Sunday, Armen Taylor as Trey, Kimberly Brooks as Tracy
108	28	"Short Wait"	Kiana Khansmith	Written by : Mike Trapp, Eric Brown & Stevie Borbolla; Storyboarded by : Eric Brown & Stevie Borbolla	Mike Trapp	July 26, 2025	428	N/A
108	28	"Awful Lawful"	Kiana Khansmith	Written by : Carson Montgomery, Jen Begeman & Lydia Estepp; Storyboarded by : Jen Begeman & Lydia Estepp	Carson Montgomery	July 26, 2025	428	N/A
"Short Wait": Bill finds an unused giftcard for the casual sit-down restaurant Weekdays in the garbage can and decides to take Cricket and Tilly out. Upon their arrival, the hostess tells them that it will be a short wait and they get a buzzer to let them know that their table is ready. Unfortunately, Cricket can't seem to wait for long as his stomach starts taking on a personality. He tries to find ways to hurry up the wait with one of them causing the health inspector Suzette Blair to look into one of the supposed health code violations and Cricket to look for other food nearby. Meanwhile, Tilly starts to worship the buzzer and tries to form a cult out of the waiting customers. In the end when Cricket's impatience costs them their table and Bill says he could've waited if he wanted to, Cricket does the right thing and the family waits until they finally get their dinner. "Awful Lawful": At the Smalton History Museum run by Frank, Nancy, Cricket, Tilly, and Remy are shown the different exhibits there. One of the items is a list of activities that are considered "technically" illegal like dancing while churning butter which led to some milk getting spilled and smelling up Smalton at one point. Inspired by the list, Cricket snatches it and runs off planning to break all of its "technically" illegal rules. To keep Cricket from doing that in fear of him starting a life of crime like she did, Nancy and Frank in his sheriff job appoint Patti, Wayne, and Tracy to help them out. Meanwhile, Tilly and Remy learn about the stuff done with the old fashion toys by Saul as they try to master the old fashion toys. Guest stars: Vella Lovell as Hostess, Sheryl Lee Ralph as Suzette Blair, John Early as Alexander, Shane Houghton as Archibald Burgers, Armen Taylor as Trey, Kimberly Brooks as Tracy, Tony Cavalero as Wayne, Brooke Dillman as Patti, Lance Barber as Frank, Frank Welker as Saul
109	29	"Scooped!"	Kiana Khansmith	Written by : Kenny Byerly, Jen Begeman & Lydia Estepp; Storyboarded by : Jen Begeman & Lydia Estepp	Kenny Byerly	August 2, 2025 (Note: This episode first premiered on Disney+ in the United States on July 30, 2025, ahead of its official air date.)	429	N/A
109	29	"Mulligan'd"	Nick Sumida	Written by : Laura Eichhorn, Gabi Rodea, & Carl Edward Mongan; Storyboarded by : Gabi Rodea & Carl Edward Mongan	Laura Eichhorn	August 2, 2025	429	N/A
"Scooped!": En route to the community center, Tilly finds that there is a lot of dog poop that haven't been picked up. She takes her father around town where they pick up any dog poop they can find. Tilly even starts going to extreme on her goals by intimidating people like Brett into picking up their dog poop. Though she has a problem when an inconsiderate man doesn't pick it up and ropes Cricket into teaching him a lesson which doesn't go the way Tilly hoped. Meanwhile, Community Sue ropes Gramma Alice into helping her with a project. "Mulligan'd": Due to the fact that a company that makes creamed corn is going out of business, Nancy has no place to sell her corn. Nick comes up with a plan to start a U-Pick operation even though Nancy has noted that her father has mostly cheated and swindled people for most of his life. Nancy only allows it when Nick vows not to do any swindling. Outside of the corn picking, the farm is improved with a corn maze, a petting zoo, and a tractor ride that the customers also make use of. Though Nancy is still suspicious that Nick might do some swindling. Guest stars: Betsy Sodaro as Community Sue, Colton Dunn as Brett, J.G. Quintel as Inconsiderate Man, Candace Kozak as Young Nancy Green, Billy West as Nick, Shane Houghton as Inexperience Customer and Photo Dad, Jorge R. Gutierrez as Santos and Customer #1
110	30	"Rehashed History (Note: This is a reworking of a scrapped season 1 episode titled "Hands-On History", retaining much of the original storyboards and voice recordings with a framing device added to it.)"	Nick Sumida & Monica Ray	Written by : Carson Montgomery, Cheyenne Curtis, Caldwell Tanner, Raj Brueggemann & Ariel Vracin-Harrell; Storyboarded by : Cheyenne Curtis, Caldwell Tanner, Raj Brueggemann & Ariel Vracin-Harrell	Carson Montgomery	August 9, 2025	430	N/A
110	30	"Unplanned"	Nick Sumida	Written by : Shane Houghton, Laura Eichhorn, Raj Brueggemann, & Ariel Vracin-Harrell; Storyboarded by : Raj Brueggemann & Ariel Vracin-Harrell	Shane Houghton & Laura Eichorn	August 9, 2025	430	N/A
"Rehashed History": As Cricket, Remy, and Tilly are playing video games together, Cricket and Remy recount on how their friendship was nearly ended. It all started sometime after the events of "Space Chicken" where Cricket and Remy pay a visit to the Big City Science and History Museum where Remy has a gold card membership. They soon run into the curator and Remy's idol Dr. Ponderstein who starts to educate people. Cricket prefers to mess up the displays as Remy tries to stop him. When Dr. Ponderstein catches Cricket in the act at the dinosaur skeleton display, he offers to Remy a platinum card membership to the museum if he can help him catch Cricket for an "experiment". Though Remy related, he ends up rescuing Cricket while giving up his platinum card membership enough that it causes Dr. Ponderstein to get hurt and the museum to catch fire. "Unplanned": At the Green family farm, the Green family goes through various home videos. After one about Tilly, Cricket stumbles upon a follow-up that has Bill reacting to the news of Nancy's surprise second pregnancy and having a meltdown about it as he stated that he hoped to have one child, revealing Cricket's birth was unplanned and Bill didn't want a second child. This ends up affecting Cricket who runs away later that night. The next day, the rest of the family finds Cricket gone as Bill claims that he didn't mean any of those words as he panicked at the time. Cricket stumbles upon a traveling circus where he meets its ringmaster, a strongwoman named Mila, two circus clowns, a long-bearded man named Long-Beard Bob, and an actor in a lion suit where they take pity on Cricket. Eventually, Bill apologizes upon chasing after the circus train and Cricket is allowed by the ringmaster to use the cannon to return to him. During the credits, more home movies are shown detailing Bill playing with Cricket and giving him his signature bowl cut. Guest stars: Mark Hamill as Dr. Ponderstein, Shane Houghton as Long-Beard Bob, Kyle Kinane as Dweezil, Richard Kind as Ringmaster
