= Pete Schwaba =

American comedian, filmmaker, screenwriter, and television and radio host

Pete Schwaba is an American comedian, filmmaker, screenwriter, and media host. He is known for hosting PBS Wisconsin's independent film series Director’s Cut, writing the romantic comedy A Guy Thing (2003), and writing, directing, and starring in the independent feature The Godfather of Green Bay (2005). He also hosts the nightly entertainment radio show Nite Lite with Pete Schwaba on Civic Media’s stations across Wisconsin.

== Career ==
Schwaba began his career as a stand-up comedian before moving into screenwriting and film. He co-wrote the MGM romantic comedy A Guy Thing (2003). He later wrote, directed, and starred in the 2005 independent comedy The Godfather of Green Bay, which also featured Lauren Holly, Tony Goldwyn, Thomas Lennon, and Lance Barber.

=== Director’s Cut ===
Schwaba serves as the longtime host of PBS Wisconsin’s film focused interview program Director’s Cut.

=== Radio hosting ===
On December 4, 2023, Schwaba debuted Nite Lite with Pete Schwaba, a nightly entertainment and culture talk show.

== Filmography ==
=== Film ===
- A Guy Thing (2003) – writer
- The Godfather of Green Bay (2005) – writer, director, actor (Joe Keegan)
- Aquarians (2017) - actor (Tom Marx)
- Speaking in Tongues - actor (Pastor Dan)

=== Television and digital media ===
- Redneck Dreams (2008) – producer
- The Disco Principal (2009) – writer, executive producer
- Indie Guys (2016) – host
- Nite Lite with Pete Schwaba (2024– ) – host, producer

== Personal life ==
Schwaba is originally from Chicago, Illinois, and now lives in Marinette, Wisconsin.
