= Big City Greens season 5 =

Big City Greens
- Season 5
- Promotional poster
- Starring: Chris Houghton; Marieve Herington; Bob Joles; Artemis Pebdani; Zeno Robinson; Wendi McLendon-Covey; Billy West; Anna Akana
- No. of episodes: 8

Release
- Original network: Disney Channel
- Original release: August 21, 2026 – present

Season chronology
- ← Previous; Season 4

The fifth season of the American animated sitcom Big City Greens, created by the Houghton Brothers (Chris and Shane Houghton), premiered on Disney Channel on August 21, 2026. This season continues the adventures of the Green family, alternating between their Big City and Smalton homes.

The series features the voices of Chris Houghton, Marieve Herington, Bob Joles, Artemis Pebdani, Zeno Robinson, Wendi McLendon-Covey, Billy West, and Anna Akana. Guest stars in this season include Stephen King, Luke Combs, Dylan Sprouse, Megan Stalter, Chad Michael Murray, Kevin Smith, Jason Mewes, Cobie Smulders, Clark Gregg, Matt Gourley, Sona Movsesian, Aaron Bleyaert, Martha Kelly, Whoopi Goldberg, Steve Schirripa, and Mike Colter.

== Production ==
Big City Greens was renewed for a fifth season on June 11, 2024, while the fourth season was still airing. Because of the long hiatus, it was rumored that the series was cancelled, though Chris Houghton denied this. The season's release date would later be revealed by Houghton. The trailer for the season was released on August 6, 2026.

== Episodes ==
No. overall	No. in season	Title	Directed by	Written and storyboarded by	Story by	Original release date	Prod. code	U.S. viewers (millions)
111	1	"Gloria Green"	Raj Brueggemann	Written by : Kenny Byerly, Kiana Khansmith, & Eric Brown; Storyboarded by : Kiana Khansmith & Eric Brown	Kenny Byerly	August 21, 2026	501	TBA
111	1	"Daddy Ditty"	Raj Brueggemann	Written by : Carson Montgomery, Jen Begeman, & Ron Stanage; Storyboarded by : Jen Begeman & Ron Stanage	Carson Montgomery	August 21, 2026	501	TBA
"Gloria Green": Gloria tries to move out of the Greens' house after the Greens affect her date with a man named Tyler, but wonders if she can handle life on her own again. "Daddy Ditty": Gramma, Cricket and Tilly force a country music star named Rusty Twang to write a song for Bill. Guest stars: Dylan Sprouse as Tyler, Raven-Symoné as Maria Media, Shane Houghton as Don, Maurice LaMarche as Mr. Grigorian, Andy Daly as Officer Keys, Andy Richter as Mayor Hansock, Kyle Mooney as Mikey, Luke Combs as Rusty Twang
112	2	"Fitness Test"	Raj Brueggemann	Written by : Laura Eichhorn, Kiana Khansmith, & Eric Brown; Storyboarded by : Kiana Khansmith & Eric Brown	Laura Eichhorn	August 21, 2026	502	TBA
112	2	"The Farmies"	Nick Sumida	Written by : Nate Federman, Ariel Vracin-Harrell, Madeleine Flores, & Natasha Kline; Storyboarded by : Ariel Vracin-Harrell, Madeleine Flores, & Natasha Kline	Nate Federman	August 21, 2026	502	TBA
"Fitness Test": At the Big City Community Center, Community Sue sets up the Mayoral Fitness Test which will be attended by a man named Mr. Brawn. Remy excuses himself from the mayoral fitness test which lead to him having to attempt to go visit Mayor Hansock. Cricket is turned into a super soldier when Mr. Hansock gives his information to an unnamed general and his unnamed scientist. "The Farmies": Smalton his holding the annual Farmies for all the local farmers. Bill competes for the Golden Gourd award after seeing that the Mass Produce company that originally put him out of business will be in attendance. He pulls off all the tricks in order to impress them. Tilly falls for a Hot Potato that she names Russet and enlists Nancy in helping her in helping her with her potato crush. Guest stars: Mike Colter as Mr. Brawn, Clark Gregg as General, Cobie Smulders as Scientist, Betsy Sodaro as Community Sue, Andy Richter as Mayor Hansock, Eli Witcher as Benny, Charley Rowan McCain as British Orphan, Lance Barber as Frank, Chad Michael Murray as Hot Potato, Matt Gourley as Male Mass Produce Rep and Farmer Zachariah, Sona Movsesian as Female Mass Produce Rep, Aaron Bleyaert as Farmer Eliam
113	3	"Metal Heads"	Raj Brueggemann	Written by : Laura Eichhorn, Jen Begeman & Ron Stanage; Storyboarded by : Jen Begeman & Ron Stanage	Laura Eichhorn	August 21, 2026	503	TBA
113	3	"Potted Meat"	Nick Sumida	Written by : Carson Montgomery, Gabi Rodea & Carl Edward Mongan; Storyboarded by : Gabi Rodea & Carl Edward Mongan	Carson Montgomery	August 21, 2026	503	TBA
"Metal Heads": Bill buys the kids a metal detector. "Potted Meat": When Gramma complains that Cricket and Tilly are soft, the kids try to prove they can handle the deprivations of Gramma's childhood. Guest stars: Shane Houghton as Confused Shopper, Candi Milo as Woman with Braces, Dave Fennoy as Bounty Beeper Pro, Roger Craig Smith as Smoogie
114	4	"Caging Cricket"	Raj Brueggemann	Written by : Nate Federman, Jen Begeman, & Ron Stanage; Storyboarded by : Jen Begeman & Ron Stanage	Nate Federman	August 21, 2026	504	TBA
114	4	"Trainer Tilly"	Nick Sumida	Written by : Nate Federman, Gabi Rodea & Carl Edward Mongan; Storyboarded by : Gabi Rodea & Carl Edward Mongan	Nate Federman	August 21, 2026	504	TBA
"Caging Cricket": When Bill betrays Cricket's trust, Cricket traps him in a cage and runs to an amusement park. One shenanigan ends up causing Cricket to enrage three local hippies. "Trainer Tilly": Tilly trains Cricket to be civilized so he can go to a fancy gala at the Remingtons where they are wanting to finalize a deal with the wealthy Mr. Toity. Guest stars: Mary Elizabeth McGlynn as Rainstick Hippie, Martha Kelly as Flute Hippie, Lorraine Toussaint as Rashida Remington, Colton Dunn as Russell Remington and Hanging Plant Hippie, Shane Houghton as Michael and Butler, Eli Witcher as Benny, Dee Bradley Baker as Melissa, Rich Sommer as Mr. Toity
115	5	"Remy Regatta"	Raj Brueggemann	Written by : Kenny Byerly, Kiana Khansmith, & Eric Brown; Storyboarded by : Kiana Khansmith & Eric Brown	Kenny Byerly	August 21, 2026	505	TBA
115	5	"Green Journalism"	Nick Sumida	Written by : Carson Montgomery, Ariel Vracin-Harrell, Gabi Rodea & Justin Nichols; Storyboarded by : Ariel Vracin-Harrell, Gabi Rodea & Justin Nichols	Carson Montgomery	August 21, 2026	505	TBA
"Remy Regatta": Rashida Remington is going up against her rival Mr. Moneybucks at a regatta. After a fight with his mom, Remy decides to skipper his own ship with help from the Greens. "Green Journalism": Tilly fears her family is growing distant and starts a newspaper called the Tilly Times to keep them connected. Guest stars: Danny Trejo as Vasquez, Joe Cappa as Windsurfer Dude, Lorraine Toussaint as Rashida Remington, Colton Dunn as Russell Remington, Shane Houghton as Tuxedo Man, Dan Stevens as Saxon
116	6	"Killer Kludge"	Nick Sumida	Written by : Mike Trapp, Spike Morales-Westlake, Ariel Vracin-Harrell, & Madeleine Flores; Storyboarded by : Ariel Vracin-Harrell & Madeleine Flores	Shane Houghton	October 3, 2026	TBA	TBA
116	6	"Tricked"	Nick Sumida	Written by : Mike Trapp, Gabi Rodea & Carl Edward Mongan; Storyboarded by : Gabi Rodea & Carl Edward Mongan	Mike Trapp	October 3, 2026	TBA	TBA
"Killer Kludge": After using the kludge to ram into the old hay baler that cut his finger off when he was younger, Bill notices that the Kludge is acting strange and believes that it's possessed by the spirit of the old hay baler. "Tricked": During their first Halloween in Smalton, Cricket & Tilly find themselves getting chased by a killer scarecrow, and no one will help them cause they think it's another one of Cricket's recent pranks. Guest stars: Stephen King as himself, Jeffrey DeMunn as Charlie, Clancy Brown as Kludge A114, Andy Daly as Officer Keys, Maurice LaMarche as Mr. Grigorian, Fred Tatasciore as Scarecrow & Jerry, Lance Barber as Frank, Brooke Dillman as Patti, Tony Cavalero as Wayne, Armen Taylor as Trey Hicks
117	7	"Wise Gals"	Nick Sumida	Written by : Mike Trapp, Ariel Vracin-Harrell, & Gabi Rodea; Storyboarded by : Ariel Vracin-Harrell & Gabi Rodea	Mike Trapp	November 7, 2026	TBA	TBA
117	7	"Big Sweater"	Nick Sumida	Written by : Nate Federman, Derek Evanick, Amy Mai, & Carl Edward Mongan; Storyboarded by : Derek Evanick, Amy Mai & Carl Edward Mongan	Nate Federman	November 7, 2026	TBA	TBA
"Wise Gals": When Nancy feels like she isn't as cool as she used to be when she was younger, her & Gloria go out for a night on the town. Meanwhile, the Greens try to dispose of a bat that got into the house. "Big Sweater": After accidentally destroying Smalton's newest Roadside attraction (it being a giant sweater), Nick is sentenced to knit the town a new attraction which Remy offers to help him with. Meanwhile, Cricket & Tilly try to sell t-shirts promoting the town's giant sweater, but struggle due to the giant sweater having recently been destroyed by Nick and people thinking it's just one of Cricket's schemes. Guest stars: Steve Schirripa as Don Ravioli, Vincent Martella as Gio Ravioli, Lance Barber as Frank, Brooke Dillman as Patti, Tony Cavalero as Wayne, Armen Taylor as Trey Hicks, Kimberly Brooks as Tracy Hicks
118	8	"Perked Up"	Raj Brueggemann	Written by : Kenny Byerly, Tom Gammill, Jen Begeman, & Ron Stanage; Storyboarded by : Jen Begeman & Ron Stanage	Kenny Byerly & Tom Gammill	November 14, 2026	TBA	TBA
118	8	"Chicken Coup"	Nick Sumida	Written by : Laura Eichhorn, Gabi Rodea, & Ariel Vracin-Harrell; Storyboarded by : Gabi Rodea & Ariel Vracin-Harrell	Laura Eichhorn	November 14, 2026	TBA	TBA
"Perked Up": Doug Perkins introduces himself to Gloria by telling her stories about his own experiences with the Greens, but she begins to suspect that his stories aren't adding up. "Chicken Coup": After Nancy takes Cricket & Tilly with her to the Smalton farmer's market and leaves Nick in charge (who just lays around watching TV), Cogburn once again tries to overthrow Phoenix as the head animal ruler of the farm with the aid of forest animals. Guest stars: Rachel Dratch as Mrs. Hudkins, Ray Wise as Eulogist, Kevin Smith as Dave, Jason Mewes as Ricky, Meredith Hagner as Butterscotch, Héctor Elizondo as Eagle, Windsor Herington-Jones as Bunny, Emily Tully as Deer, Tom Gammill as Doug Perkins, Alfred Molina as Cogburn, Jameela Jamil as Phoenix, C.H. Greenblatt as Marmot
119	9	"Forever Christmas"	N/A	N/A	N/A	November 28, 2026 (Note: This episode first premiered on Disney+ in the United States on November 25, 2026, ahead of its official air date.)	TBA	TBA
119	9	"Skate Expectations"	N/A	N/A	N/A	November 28, 2026	TBA	TBA
