= Dream Tree =

2024 episode of Big City Greens

- Big City Greens segment
- Title card
- Episode no.: Season 4 Episode 12a
- Directed by: Nick Sumida
- Written by: Nate Federman; Gabi Rodea; Carl Edward Mongan
- Production code: 412a
- Original air date: December 7, 2024
- Running time: 11 minutes

Episode chronology
| ← Previous "Hard Bargain" | Next → "Blue Greens" |
- Big City Greens season 4

"Dream Tree" is the first segment of the twelfth episode of the fourth season of the American animated sitcom Big City Greens. "Dream Tree" originally aired in the United States on December 7, 2024, on Disney Channel and Disney XD. An exclusive clip from this episode was released prior to its premiere.

In this episode, Bill and Cricket follow clues from a dream that Cricket had to search the woods for the perfect Christmas tree.

== Plot ==
Bill is driving his family back to the country so that they can all spend Christmas together. After arriving, Nancy notices that Bill didn't bring a Christmas tree. He explains that he is waiting for the "Spirit of Christmas" to give him a sign so that he can find the perfect tree. Cricket, who was asleep on the drive over, wakes up and tells Bill that he had a dream about an "awesome Christmas tree", after having eaten tinsel. Taking this as the sign, Bill drags Cricket along to explain details about his dream, so that they can look for the tree. Meanwhile, Tilly convinces a reluctant Nick to join her, Nancy, and Gramma Alice to go caroling together using hot cocoa as an incentive.

Bill and Cricket journey through the woods, passing by a frozen fish and a stick (Cricket dreamed of fish sticks) before rolling down a hill in snowballs, crashing through a fence and forming a sleigh out of it. Cricket mentions that he heard music, which they interpret as a moose's horns (though technically they are antlers). They are chased into an open field where Bill spots a large beautiful tree, but Cricket takes an interest in a dinky sized one instead. In Smalton, Tilly tries to get Nick to sing, but he refuses finding the whole thing stupid. He ultimately reveals that he sang when he was 12, but that everyone laughed at him. Tilly convinces him to rejoin the caroling.

Cricket saves the small tree, as the large one gets destroyed by the moose. Bill and Cricket run for their lives back to the house while Nick sings back in Smalton, revealing that he has an excellent falsetto voice. Everyone applauds with Tilly believing that the laughing was them admiring his vocals. After making back to the house, Bill is disappointed until he sees that everyone loves Cricket's small tree and believes that this is what the Spirit of Christmas was trying to show him. He rejoins the entire Green clan as they decorate the tree and sing together, with Nick showing off his vocal skills.

== Voice cast ==
- Chris Houghton as Cricket Green
- Marieve Herington as Tilly Green
- Bob Joles as Bill Green
- Artemis Pebdani as Alice Green
- Wendi McLendon-Covey as Nancy Green
- Billy West as Nick Mulligan

== Reception ==
The episode received 0.13 million viewers on its premiere. David Kaldor of Bubbleblabber gave this segment, alongside its sister segment "Blue Greens", an 8 out of 10.
