= Baraboo (film) =

2009 drama film

- Directed by: Mary Sweeney
- Written by: Mary Sweeney
- Produced by: Mary Sweeney
- Starring: Phillip J. Berns; Gladys Chmiel; Brenda DeVita; Flora Coker
- Cinematography: Shana Hagan
- Edited by: Mary Sweeney
- Music by: Emma Beaton
- Release date: August 1, 2009 (Edinburgh International Film Festival)
- Running time: 99 minutes
- Country: United States
- Language: English

Baraboo is a 2009 American independent drama film produced, written and directed by Mary Sweeney. The film is set around a rural motel and gas station in Wisconsin and follows the intertwined lives of its residents and visitors. It premiered at the Edinburgh International Film Festival and received a limited theatrical release in the United States.

== Plot ==
Baraboo focuses on a small ensemble of characters connected by a rundown motel and gas station in rural Wisconsin. Jane, a single mother, works to maintain the business while raising her troubled teenage son, Chris. Their daily rhythm is punctuated by the arrival of Bernice, an outspoken elderly woman who challenges both Jane and others with candid observations.

== Cast ==
- Phillip J. Berns as Eric
- Gladys Chmiel as Cora
- Brenda DeVita as Jane
- Harry Loeffler-Bell as Chris
- Ruth Schudson as Bernice
- Clint R. Clingerman as Motel Guest
- Flora Coker as Woman with Dead Husband

== Production ==
After working on The Straight Story as an editor and writer with frequent collaborator David Lynch, Mary Sweeney started developing her own script. Principal photography took place in the summer of 2008 at the former Devil's Lake Resort near Devil's Lake State Park in Wisconsin. The resort's cabins, dating from the 1930s and 1940s, were renamed “Petersen’s Cabins” for the film. During development, the project carried the working title Motel Gas Station before being retitled Baraboo. Despite its title, the film does not directly reference the city of Baraboo, instead focusing on a fictional rural campground setting. Sweeney has stated that the name was chosen for its sound and ambiguity, particularly for audiences unfamiliar with Wisconsin.

== Release ==
The film premiered at the Edinburgh International Film Festival in 2009. It later screened at the Wisconsin Film Festival, where it received two Golden Badger Awards, including Best Narrative Feature and Best Director. It subsequently received a limited release in the United States in 2010.

== Reception ==
In a review for The Hollywood Reporter, the film was described as a “well-meaning but underwhelming Wisconsin chronicle,” noting its gentle tone and episodic structure while critiquing its pacing and lack of dramatic urgency. The review also contrasted the film's grounded realism with the surreal style associated with Sweeney's previous collaborations with director David Lynch. Variety described the film as a sentimental independent drama, while criticizing its script, cinematography, and performances, concluding that the film was likely to appeal only to niche audiences.

User reviews on Internet Movie Database assign the film 7.1/10, a generally positive audience rating, with appreciations for its performances and regional authenticity.

== See also ==
- Film industry in Wisconsin
