= Speaking in Tongues (2018 film) =

- Theatrical poster
- Directed by: Nathan Deming
- Written by: Nathan Deming; Lawrie Doran
- Produced by: Harry Cherniak; Nathan Deming; Lawrie Doran
- Starring: Scott Hennelly; Tyler Esselman; William Walton; Pete Schwaba
- Cinematography: Mark Khalife
- Edited by: Astrid Carlen-Helmer
- Music by: Andrea Boccadoro
- Distributed by: MPX Films
- Release date: 2018
- Running time: 94 minutes
- Country: United States
- Language: English

Speaking in Tongues is a 2018 American independent drama film written and directed by Nathan Deming and co-written by Lawrie Doran. The film follows Jake, a socially isolated college student in Eau Claire, Wisconsin, who converts to Christianity following the death of his mother and joins an evangelism internship in Chicago. As Jake becomes immersed in a highly structured religious environment, he begins to question his beliefs. The film premiered at the Austin Film Festival and was later acquired for distribution by MPX Films.

== Plot ==
Jake (Scott Hennelly) is a bright but socially isolated college student living in Eau Claire, Wisconsin. After the death of his mother, Jake converts to evangelical Christianity, is baptized, and joins a local church. The experience gives him a renewed sense of hope and belonging, though he continues to struggle with loneliness and difficulty forming relationships at college.

Jake's pastor encourages him to join an evangelism internship in Chicago, a summer program focused on helping establish a new church. Although Jake's father is skeptical of the decision, he ultimately allows Jake to go. Upon arriving in Chicago, Jake is introduced to a highly structured environment alongside five other interns. The group follows a demanding routine of worship, training, and personal accountability.

Initially, Jake feels out of place among the other interns, many of whom are lifelong Christians with deep familiarity with scripture. Over time, however, he becomes more confident and is gradually accepted into the group, forming close friendships and gaining a stronger sense of community. As the summer progresses, Jake begins participating in street evangelism, where he encounters a wide range of beliefs and perspectives on faith.

As the summer continues, Jake becomes increasingly committed to his faith and grows particularly focused on speaking in tongues and the urgency of saving those he considers lost. At the same time, he begins to encounter aspects of the church's beliefs and practices that he had not previously been aware of, including harsher views toward outsiders and dissent. Confronted with these contradictions, Jake starts to question the framework provided by his pastor and recognizes the need to determine for himself what he truly believes.

== Cast ==
- Scott Hennelly as Jake
- Tyler Esselman as Pastor Eli Daniels
- William Walton as Philip
- Sedra as Drew
- William French as Brad
- Pete Schwaba as Dan Fogelman
- Charlie Lubeck as Sparks (Justin)
- Barbara Malangoni as Aunt Carol
- Keith Kelly as Uncle Max
- Peter Nerad as Dad
- Kelsey Risher as Sarah Daniels

== Production ==
Speaking in Tongues was developed as an independent feature following Deming's London Film School short film about the subject that played at the Edinburgh International Film Festival with the plot being described as a "coming of atheism" film. The screenplay was co-written by Deming and Lawrie Doran. Production took place primarily in Chicago, Illinois with winter scenes filmed in Eau Claire, Wisconsin.

== Release ==
The film premiered at the Austin Film Festival in 2018, where it screened as part of the narrative feature competition. In a review following its Austin Film Festival premiere, the online review outlet Film Daze described the film as "a quiet and restrained examination of evangelical culture", noting its focus on the pressures placed on young believers and the gradual emergence of doubt rather than overt critique. It was distributed online in 2020 by MPX Films and Alarm Pictures.
