= Nite Lite with Pete Schwaba =

Wisconsin-based entertainment radio program

- Other names: Nite Lite
- Genre: Entertainment talk
- Country of origin: United States
- Language: English
- Home station: Civic Media
- Hosted by: Pete Schwaba
- Original release: December 4, 2023 – present
- Audio format: Radio, streaming
- Website: https://civicmedia.us/shows/nite-lite

Nite Lite with Pete Schwaba is an American nightly entertainment and culture radio program hosted by comedian and filmmaker Pete Schwaba. The show airs across Civic Media’s progressive talk radio network in Wisconsin.

== Overview ==
Nite Lite premiered on December 4, 2023, as part of Civic Media's expansion of locally hosted programming. The 2 hour-long show features interviews, conversations about arts and culture in Wisconsin and a wider focus on the entertainment industry. Guests on the program have included notable entertainment figures from Wisconsin, such as filmmaker David Zucker.
