= Ludicious =

Swiss gaming convention

Ludicious – Zürich Game Festival
- Status: discontinued, spiritual successor is Gamesweek Zurich
- Genre: Convention
- Frequency: Annual
- Location: Zürich
- Country: Switzerland
- Inaugurated: 2014
- Most recent: 2020 (virtual)
- Attendance: 700

Ludicious – Zürich Game Festival is a video game industry and development convention in Zürich, Switzerland. The most recent edition took place from January 31. to Feb 3. 2019.

The festival has taken place in 2014, 2016, 2017, and 2018. In 2018, the convention consisted of a three-day schedule of presentations and activities aimed at game developers and publishers, attended by about 700 people, and of a two-day free-to-access programme aimed at the general public, particularly families and children. The conference program was organized in cooperation with the Zurich University of the Arts and the ETH Zurich, which curated summits on visual aesthetics in games and game technologies, respectively. Since the beginning in 2014, the annual SGDA Swiss Game Awards are also presented during the opening gala of Ludicious.

== Competitions ==
The convention presents two awards, chosen by a jury of game industry professionals based on a list of nominations also selected by the jury from public entries.

=== Innovation in Games Award (International) ===
The international competition "honours innovative games that explore novel ideas and convince in their execution", and is aimed at small studios and budgets. The criteria include "new ideas and approaches in game design, visual style or storytelling".

The following games have won the international competition:

- 2014: A Tale Of Two Worlds by ENJMIN
- 2016: Prune by Joel McDonald
- 2017: Reigns by Devolver Digital
- 2018: Witchball by Stephen Clark

=== Emerging Talent Award (International Student) ===
The student competition honors games made by students that "demonstrate a level of creativity and quality that is exceptional among its peers".

The following games have won the student competition:

- 2014: Soft Body by Zeke Virant
- 2016: FAR by Don Schmocker
- 2017: Nocturnal Hunt by Wolf Pack
- 2018: Tell Me What you See by Pesky Bees
