= The Godfather of Green Bay =

- movie poster
- Directed by: Pete Schwaba
- Written by: Pete Schwaba
- Produced by: Pete Schwaba; Brian R. Etting
- Starring: Pete Schwaba; Lance Barber; Lauren Holly
- Release date: 2005
- Running time: 90 minutes
- Country: United States
- Language: English

The Godfather of Green Bay is a fictional comedic movie released in 2005. It follows the tale of stand-up comedian Joe Keegan (played by Pete Schwaba, who also directed and wrote the film). Joe makes a last-ditch effort to save his career by traveling to a small Wisconsin town where a talent booker for The Tonight Show is in the audience at "Rocktoberfest".

The Godfather of Green Bay refers to a particularly difficult audience member named Big Jake Norquist (played by Tony Goldwyn) at Joe's final performance, who just so happens to be interested in Joe's girlfriend.

The film was produced in 2003 with filming locations in Marinette, Wisconsin and Menominee, Michigan. Pete Schwaba directed and produced in addition to starring. The film's soundtrack was provided by Kurt Neumann of BoDeans.

== Cast ==
- Tony Goldwyn as Big Jake Norquist
- Lauren Holly as Molly Mahoney
- Pete Schwaba as Joe Keegan
- Jimmy Pardo as Higgins
- Lance Barber as Kenny Caruso
- Thomas Lennon as DUG
- Steve Seagren as Ralphy
- Eric Price as Ratboy
- Mark Borchardt as Skeeter
- Mike Siegel as Driver
- Tracy Thorpe as Janice
- Dennis LaValle as Harvey Skorik
- Duane Sharp as Sheriff

== See also ==
- Independent film
- Film industry in Wisconsin
