= Green and Gold =

2025 American film by Anders Lindwall

- Theatrical release poster
- Directed by: Anders Lindwall
- Written by: Anders Lindwall; Steven Shafer; Michael Graf; Missy Mareau Garcia
- Produced by: Davin Lindwall; Aaron Boyd
- Starring: Craig T. Nelson; Brandon Sklenar; M. Emmet Walsh; Madison Lawlor
- Cinematography: Russ Fraser
- Edited by: Scott Hanson
- Music by: Corey Martin
- Distributed by: Fathom Events
- Release date: January 31, 2025
- Running time: 95 minutes
- Country: United States
- Language: English
- Box office: $1.7 million

Green and Gold is a 2025 American drama film written by Anders Lindwall, Steven Shafer, Michael Graf, and Missy Mareau Garcia, directed by Anders Lindwall and starring Craig T. Nelson. Set in 1993, the film is about a Wisconsin farmer facing foreclosure, who bets his bank that the Green Bay Packers will win the Super Bowl, and if they do, the bank will give him an extension on his mortgage. This marks the first theatrical film release for Lindwall. This was actor M. Emmet Walsh's final film.

Green and Gold was released in the United States by Fathom Events on January 31, 2025.

== Cast ==
- Craig T. Nelson as Buck
- Brandon Sklenar as Billy
- M. Emmet Walsh as Scotty
- Madison Lawlor as Jenny
- Charlie Berens as Radio Host

== Production ==
Green and Gold was shot in northern Wisconsin, including Door County and Green Bay, in 2021. Shooting was completed under the working title "God Loves the Green Bay Packers" and the film moved to post production in late 2021.

== Release ==
At 33rd Heartland International Film Festival the film was awarded the Jimmy Stewart Legacy Award and the Narrative Official Selection Audience Choice Award. It was also selected as the Audience Award Winner for Narrative Feature at the Austin Film Festival in 2024.

The film release is being sponsored by Culvers in support of the Thank You Farmers Project. Actor Craig T. Nelson performed the national anthem at Lambeau Field for the Green Bay Packers-Chicago Bears game on 5 January 2025 while he was in Green Bay, Wisconsin promoting the film.

== Reception ==
On the review aggregator website Rotten Tomatoes, 67% of 24 critics' reviews are positive, with an average rating of 6.2/10. The website's consensus reads: "Weaving its scrappy underdog story with subtle spiritual undertones, Green and Gold doesn't glitter with originality but does an honest day's work as a likable family film."

Glenn Kenny of The New York Times found Green and Gold to be a familiar and emotionally manipulative film that presents its protagonist, Buck, as a stubborn yet integrity-driven character, though this portrayal sometimes makes him less likable, leading the story through predictable ups and downs reminiscent of Hallmark movies. Joe Leydon of Variety described the film as a "ponderous and predictable drama" that, despite Craig T. Nelson's impressive and fearless performance as the stubborn dairy farmer Buck, ultimately fails to surprise or engage due to its reliance on tired tropes and contrived storytelling.

Richard Roeper of the Chicago Sun-Times considered Green and Gold to be a surprisingly heartfelt and authentic film that, despite initial expectations of a clichéd sports story, excels in its portrayal of farm life, strong character relationships, and "natural and empathetic" performances particularly from Madison Lawlor, all set against the backdrop of a touching narrative that resonates with emotional depth. Luna Guthrie of Collider gave the film 9/10 and praised its "sincerity" that masterfully weaves themes of nature, community, and human connection, highlighting its nostalgic, old-fashioned storytelling style and the exceptional performances of Craig T. Nelson and Madison Lawlor, which elevate it beyond typical drama. Nick Bythrow of Screen Rant also offered a positive review, giving the film a score of 7/10 and commending it as a "heartfelt tribute to rural America" that effectively portrays the strength of family through its simple yet impactful storytelling, strong character arcs, and vibrant cinematography, despite some predictable moments.

== See also ==
- Film industry in Wisconsin
