= Leigh Alexander (journalist) =

American author and journalist (born 1980s)

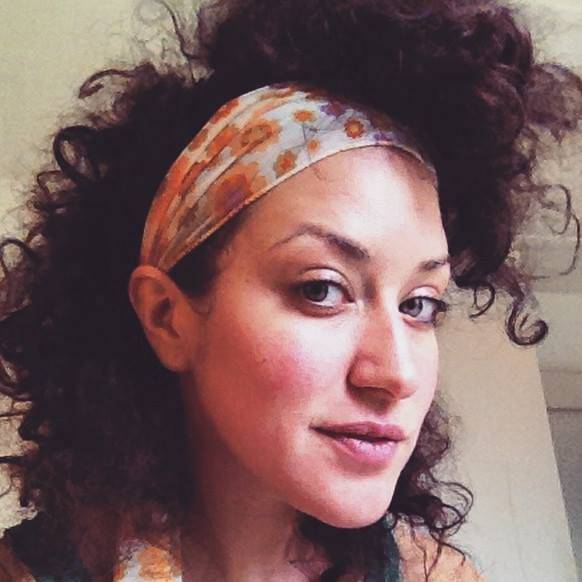
- Undated photo of Alexander
- Born: 1980 or 1981 (age 44–45); Massachusetts, U.S.
- Occupations: Journalist, writer, editor, columnist, author
- Website: leighalexander.net

Leigh Alexander (born 1980 or 1981) is an American author, journalist, and video game writer. She is the former editor-at-large and news editor for Game Developer (formerly Gamasutra), and former editor-in-chief for the revived Boing Boing website Offworld. She has writing credits on the games Reigns: Her Majesty and Reigns: Game of Thrones.

== Career ==
Her writing has appeared in Variety, the Los Angeles Times, Kotaku, Polygon, Vice, Edge, Rock Paper Shotgun, The Guardian, The Atlantic and Time. She also produces a video series called "Lo-Fi Let's Play", in which she plays and comments on adventure games from the 1980s. Discussing design influences, Alexander has described tarot as a narrative design system, saying, "Tarot and narrative design are practically the same thing."

Alexander has written two books about video games: Breathing Machine, about growing up with gaming and the nascent Internet, and Clipping Through, about life in the games industry as viewed through the lens of the Game Developers Conference (GDC). On February 14, 2015, Alexander released an illustrated short story, Mona. The book features illustrations by Emily Carroll. Alexander also recorded an audiobook version of Mona herself. Alexander cites the video game Silent Hill 2 as an inspiration. In February 2016, Alexander announced that she would be closing her website Offworld and pursuing things outside of gaming.

== Gamergate controversy ==
Alexander was one of several women who was harassed in connection with the #GamerGate hashtag. On August 28, 2014, Alexander published an article on Gamasutra titled "Gamers' don't have to be your audience. 'Gamers' are over". The article became a focal point within the Gamergate controversy, with users of #Gamergate successfully campaigning Intel to pull all of their ads from Gamasutra. Alexander criticized Intel's decision, saying "Intel was fleeced by a hate mob." Intel issued an apology and said that it did not intend to be "taking sides in an increasingly bitter debate in the gaming community." Intel later resumed advertising on Gamasutra in mid-November.

In an interview with MSNBC Digital that aired on October 21, 2014, Leigh Alexander spoke out against the Gamergate movement and talked about the harassment of game developer Zoë Quinn. Alexander stated that her criticism of Gamergate stemmed from what she believes to be "the terroristic dominance of traditional appetites in what should be a diverse and creative field."

During GDC 2015, Alexander hosted the #1ReasonToBe panel, aimed at better serving women and minorities within the video games industry. Alexander advocated for creating spaces for minorities and marginalized groups within gaming culture. Referencing both the panel and her website Offworld, Alexander said that "[it] doesn’t have to be a huge upheaval. Simply create space for our experiences in our work and lives and listen to us." The panel was well received by members of the games press like Polygon's Danielle Riendeau. The panel drew an audience that filled one of the largest venues in the GDC.

== Selected works ==
- Breathing Machine: A Memoir of Computers (January 2014, Thought Catalog)
- Clipping Through: One Mad Week in Video Games (August 2014, Gumroad)
- Mona (February 2015, Gumroad)
- The State of Play: Creators and Critics on Video Game Culture (October 2015, Seven Stories Press)

== Personal life ==
Alexander is gay and has written that she is on the "autism-adhd spectrum". Her father is black and her mother is Jewish.
