= Card Shark =

2022 video game

- Developer: Nerial
- Publisher: Devolver Digital
- Artist: Nicolai Troshinsky
- Composer: Andrea Boccadoro
- Platforms: macOS; Microsoft Windows; Nintendo Switch
- Release: June 2, 2022
- Genre: Action-adventure
- Mode: Single-player

Card Shark is an action-adventure game developed by Nerial and published by Devolver Digital. The game was released for macOS, Windows, and Nintendo Switch on June 2, 2022. Based and set in 18th century France, the game follows a mute peasant who assists Comte de Saint Germain to con gamblers from various parlors as they pursue a Royal rumor called "The Twelve Bottles of Milk".

== Gameplay ==
Card Shark is a side-scrolling action-adventure game which is centered around trickery and cheating at cards. The player takes on the role of a mute boy serving in a tavern in south France, where he is then recruited by the Comte de Saint Germain to help participate in the swindling of their opponents riches and secrets. There are approximately 28 card trick strategies to be learned to help climb the French nobility ladder with each trick becoming progressively more complex and building off of the last move. One of the first tricks that is learned is which way you need to wipe the table to correctly notify your partner of the playing card suit your opponent has in hand, while further in the game you need to manipulate the shuffling of the deck to make sure the Comte has the best hand at the table. If the trick takes too long or the player makes a mistake shuffling the deck your opponents begin to become suspicious of you, which is represented by a meter on the bottom of the screen that gradually fills up over time. If the meter fills up all the way you will have to face consequences such as being kicked out of the parlor, becoming bankrupt, or in more extreme cases you face death.

== Development ==
Card Shark is developed by Nerial, the same studio that created Reigns which is a strategy video game set in a fictional medieval world. Nerial collaborated with artist Nicolai Troshinsky to bring the gameplay and artwork of Card Shark to fruition, which would be published by Devolver Digital. The storyline was inspired by Troshinksy's love of the 1975 Stanley Kubrick film Barry Lyndon, and his own interest in card manipulation. The soundtrack for the game features original scores and reimagined classics arranged by Andrea Boccadoro and performed by a live orchestra. The music score features pieces by 18th century musicians such as Chevalier de Saint-Georges, Claude Debussy, and Johann Sebastian Bach.

== Reception ==
Reception

Aggregate scores
Aggregator	Score
Metacritic	PC: 80/100; NS: 80/100
OpenCritic	81/100; 89% Critics Recommend

Review scores
Publication	Score
Eurogamer	Recommended
Game Informer	6/10
Hardcore Gamer	4.5/5
Jeuxvideo.com	16/20
Nintendo Life	9/10
Nintendo World Report	8.5/10
NME	5/5
PC Gamer (US)	86/100
Shacknews	8/10
The Guardian	4/5
TouchArcade	4.5/5
Siliconera	8/10

Card Shark received "generally favorable" reviews according to review aggregator Metacritic.

PC Gamer praised the cheating mechanics, saying "Card Shark is the closest I've seen a game get to mimicking character actions with a gamepad. It's an ingenious system and every trick is different". The Guardian liked the art style of the title, feeling it brought each scenario in the game to life, "All this is beautifully brought to life with scribbly, expressive character portraits, wine-coloured backdrops". The Verge enjoyed the stress of the game put the player under, "even when Card Shark was challenging, I had a lot of fun mastering the techniques... I would even get legitimately nervous before "performing" tricks at some big moments". Nintendo Life felt that the dialogue elevated the game, "It's a delightful narrative all the way through, bolstered by the lighthearted, razor-sharp wit that permeates the writing".

While enjoying the card games, Nintendo World Report criticized how bugs could occasionally ruin a card game, "around the outside there are some slight rough edges with a rare but occasional game crash or bug in the animation mechanics. These make for a slight derailing to an otherwise fantastically fresh presentation". Rock Paper Shotgun felt that the game could at some points become repetitive, trying a sequence repeatedly until you got it right. Game Informer heavily disliked the game's card tricks, writing "Unfortunately, almost without exception, I found the various ploys frustrating, tedious, and sometimes difficult to comprehend. These gameplay sequences usually amount to some variation of old-school quick-time events". Eurogamer enjoyed how smoothly the game ramped up the difficulty, "One minute you're learning how to in-jog a card so your friend always gets the ace... the next you're reading cards as you deal them by watching their reflections in a mirrored tobacco case that is itself shifting around the surface of a captain's table deep inside a sailing ship".
