= Film industry in Wisconsin =

Wisconsin has a small but active film community. The state maintains a substantial commercial production sector and a growing independent filmmaking scene, with recent titles including Hundreds of Beavers and Green and Gold. Wisconsin previously operated a statewide film office and incentive program that supported productions such as Public Enemies and The Last Kiss, but the program was shut down in 2011. In 2025, Governor Tony Evers restored both the film office and a new incentive program as part of the 2025-27 biennial budget..

== History ==
Before the 1980s, films actually shot in Wisconsin were travel documentaries or short non-fiction films, except most notably Werner Herzog's Stroszek (1977).

Narrative filmmaking in the state was limited, with director Bill Rebane producing most of the region’s independent features. Rebane’s films, including The Giant Spider Invasion (1975), were made with local crews and gained regional attention before later developing cult status through Mystery Science Theater 3000. Troma Entertainment’s Blood Hook (1986) was also shot in northern Wisconsin using local cast and crew.

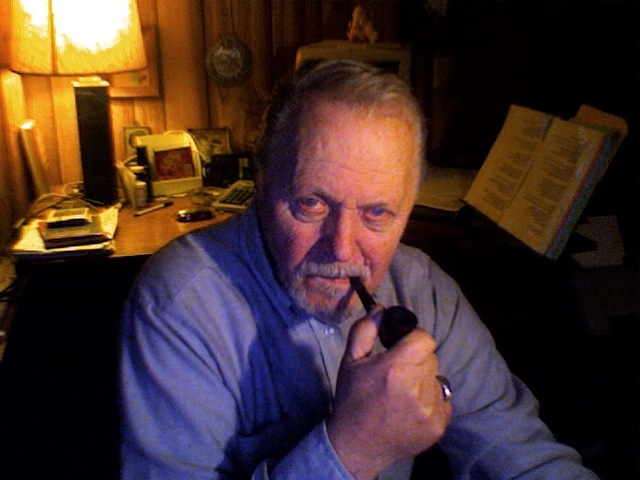
Bill Rebane in 2010, director of The Giant Spider Invasion.

The Blues Brothers (1980) was one of the first major Hollywood productions to film scenes in the state, using several Milwaukee locations. Sam Raimi’s A Simple Plan (1998), filmed partly in Ashland, Wisconsin.

Independent filmmakers in Milwaukee reached national audiences with the documentary American Movie (1999), which followed Wisconsin director Mark Borchardt as he attempted to complete his short horror film Coven. The documentary premiered at the Sundance Film Festival and became a critical success.

After the introduction of production incentives in the 2000s, several studio projects shot in Wisconsin. These included Michael Mann’s Public Enemies (2009), which shot in Columbus, Milwaukee, and Oshkosh and The Last Kiss (2006) starring Zach Braff.

Several well known films are set in Wisconsin but were shot primarily outside the state, including Bridesmaids (2011) and The Great Outdoors (1988). Bridesmaids used a small number of exterior shots in Wisconsin while principal photography took place elsewhere. The 2025 Syfy channel series Revival is set in Wausau, but was filmed in Canada.

== Independent filmmaking ==
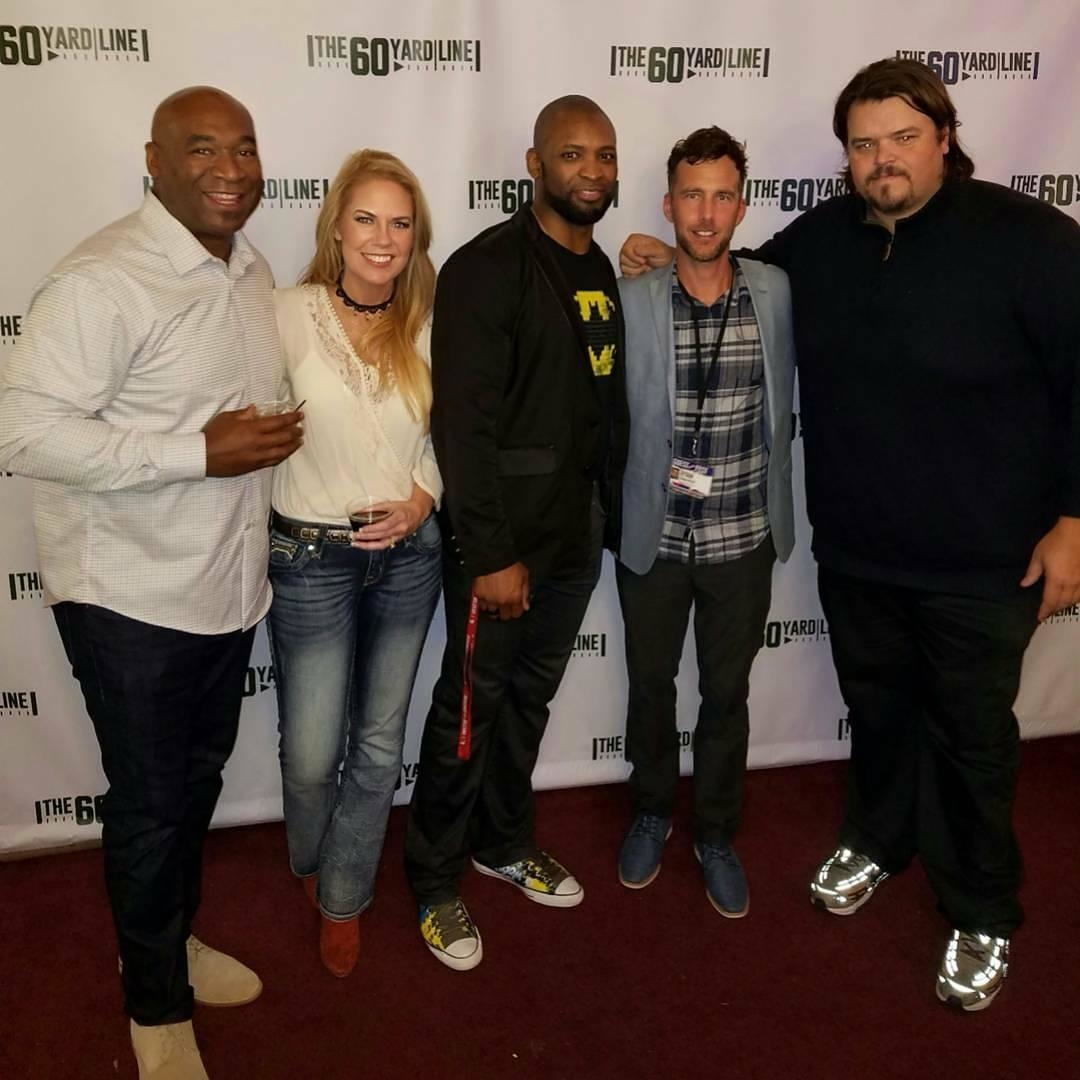
Wisconsin Film Festival premiere of The 60 Yard Line, shown here with Jacque Georgia, Gary Ellerson, Ryan Churchill, and Ahman Green.

In 2005, Pete Schwaba wrote and directed The Godfather of Green Bay starring Thomas Lennon and Jimmy Pardo in Marinette, Wisconsin. Mary Sweeney shot her independent film Baraboo in 2009 in Devil's Lake State Park. Feed the Fish is a 2010 independent film starring Tony Shalhoub and Kathryn Aselton filmed in Door County, Wisconsin.

In recent years, locally produced features such as American Fable (2016), Give Me Liberty (2019), and Green and Gold (2024) reflect a growing wave of microbudget and regionally focused filmmaking that receive national attention. Mike Cheslik’s Hundreds of Beavers (2022), produced in Wisconsin with a budget of approximately $150,000, earned more than $1 million in theatrical gross.

== Former film office and incentives (2005–2009) ==
Wisconsin closed its original state film office in July 2005. In response, industry groups organized to rebuild statewide support, leading to the creation of Film Wisconsin and the drafting of new incentive legislation. The Legislature passed a bipartisan incentive package in 2006 that took effect on January 1, 2008. The program included a 25% tax credit on qualifying salaries and wages and a 15% credit for production services and infrastructure investment.

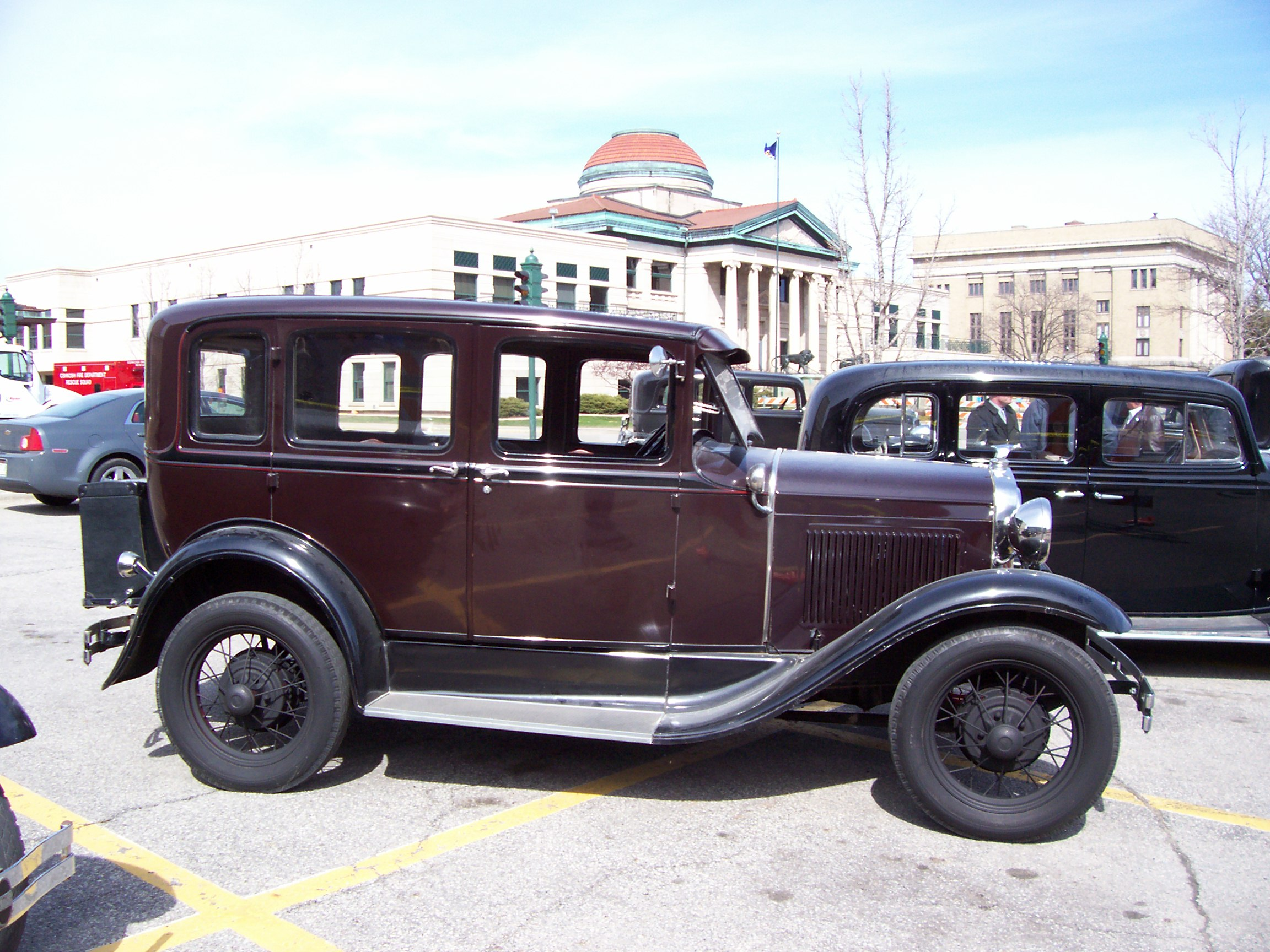
On-location filming of Public Enemies in Oshkosh, Wisconsin, shown here with a period car prepared for the production.

The program generated an influx of production activity during 2008, including Public Enemies was among the major productions to utilize the incentives.

In February 2009, a widely circulated news article questioned the cost and economic return of the incentives, prompting public debate. Subsequent analysis suggested that several categories of spending and revenue had been omitted from the state’s initial accounting, contributing to disagreement over the program’s fiscal impact.

Later in 2009, the incentive fund was capped at $500,000 annually, a level insufficient to attract sustained production. The Wisconsin Film Office was effectively shuttered shortly thereafter, and large-scale production activity declined in the following years.

== Re-establishment of incentives and film office (2025) ==
In 2025, following sustained advocacy by Action! Wisconsin, the Wisconsin Legislature approved a new statewide film and television tax‐credit programme and re-established the Wisconsin Film Office as part of the 2025–27 biennial budget.

The incentive structure includes credits on qualified in-state spending and wages, with minimum-spend thresholds for features and shorts. Production incentives also include refundable or transferable components depending on category.

Industry reports described Wisconsin as re-entering a competitive national landscape of state film incentives.

== See also ==
- Cinema of the United States
- Public Enemies (2009 film)
- American Movie
