= James DeVita =

American actor

- Born: 1960 (age 65–66); Long Island, New York, United States
- Occupations: Actor; author; director
- Children: 1 son and 1 daughter
- Website: jamesdevita.com

James "Jim" DeVita (born 1960) is an American actor, director, author, and playwright. Since 1995, he is a member of the core acting company at American Players Theatre, a classical amphitheater located in Spring Green, Wisconsin.

== Biography ==
Devita is from Long Island, New York. He spent years as a first mate on a boat off of Long Island. His one-person show In Acting Shakespeare chronicles his journey from working on fishing boats to becoming an actor and director of classical theater. The play is a personalized adaption of Ian McKellen's Acting Shakespeare, which inspired DeVita to become an actor when he saw it in 1983. DeVita has spent the bulk of his long acting career at American Players Theatre, playing among other Shakespeare roles Hamlet, Romeo, Iago, Macbeth, Leontes, Richard III, Richard II. Other favorites include Jamie Tyrone of Long Days Journey Into Night, Shannon from Night of the Iguana, Gogo in Waiting for Godot and Eddie Carbone in A View from the Bridge. DeVita is also a playwright; he won the Charlotte B. Chorpenning Award from the American Alliance of Theater and Education in recognition of his plays for Theatre for Young Audiences.

DeVita married actress Brenda Bedard in 1990. They have two children, Gale, born 1996 and Sophia, born 1998.

== Reception ==
In 2015, Wall Street Journal drama critic Terry Teachout wrote that "America has no finer classical actor than Jim DeVita."

== Published works ==
- Blue (2001)
- The Rose of Treason: A Fictional Dramatization Based on the True Story of Sophie Scholl and the White Rose (2003)
- The Silenced (2007)
- A Winsome Murder (2015)
- Christmas in Babylon (2018)

== Filmography ==
- Madison (2008) as Michael
- Aquarians (2017) as Bart Sheraski
