= A Guy Thing =

2003 film by Chris Koch

- Theatrical poster
- Directed by: Chris Koch
- Screenplay by: Greg Glienna; Pete Schwaba; Matt Tarses; Bill Wrubel
- Story by: Greg Glienna
- Produced by: David Ladd; David Nicksay
- Starring: Jason Lee; Julia Stiles; Selma Blair; James Brolin; Shawn Hatosy; Lochlyn Munro; Julie Hagerty
- Cinematography: Robbie Greenberg
- Edited by: David Moritz
- Music by: Mark Mothersbaugh
- Production companies: Metro-Goldwyn-Mayer Pictures; David Ladd Films
- Distributed by: MGM Distribution Co. (United States/Canada); 20th Century Fox (International)
- Release date: January 17, 2003
- Running time: 101 minutes
- Country: United States
- Language: English
- Budget: $20 million
- Box office: $17.4 million

A Guy Thing is a 2003 American comedy film directed by Chris Koch and starring Jason Lee, Julia Stiles and Selma Blair. The plot follows a soon-to-be husband, who wakes up on the morning after his bachelor party in bed with another woman. The film was released on January 17, 2003, to a critical and commercial failure.

== Plot ==
Paul Morse and Karen Cooper are about to get married in Seattle. During his bachelor party, Paul has a chat with one of the dancers at the party, Becky Jackson, and they find that they have an affinity for each other. Paul wakes up the next morning and is terrified to see Becky in the bed next to him.

Assuming they slept together, Paul rushes Becky out of his apartment and hopes never to see her again. He tries to cover up the connection for the remaining six days before the wedding. Unfortunately, Becky unexpectedly shows up around town and turns out to be Karen's cousin. Even worse, Becky's malicious ex-boyfriend, police detective Ray Donovan, had Becky followed and photographed. Becky and Paul meet again to steal those pictures from Ray's apartment.

Further problems arise with family and friends consistently showing up at the wrong times. Genital crabs, dirty underwear in the toilet tank, a horny best friend, and a best man/brother who is in love with the bride all provide for a week of wedding preparation hijinks. Through the snowballing of all his implausible lies and half-truths, Paul receives corroboration and support from an unexpected corner; what seems to be a coordinated network of other men, including friends, complete strangers and, to Paul's astonishment, Karen's own father; all who give the same explanation: "It's a guy thing".

== Cast ==
- Jason Lee as Paul Morse
- Julia Stiles as Becky Jackson
- Selma Blair as Karen Cooper
- James Brolin as Ken Cooper
- Shawn Hatosy as Jim
- Lochlyn Munro as Ray Donovan
- Diana Scarwid as Sandra Cooper
- David Koechner as Buck Morse
- Julie Hagerty as Dorothy Morse
- Thomas Lennon as Pete Morse
- Jackie Burroughs as Aunt Budge
- Jay Brazeau as Howard
- Larry Miller as Minister Ferris (missing in screen-roll end credits)
- Matthew Walker as Minister Green
- Dylan Winner as Moni Young
- Fred Ewanuick as Jeff
- Lisa Calder as Tonya
- Victor Varnado as Hansberry
- Donavon Stinson as Mouthy Bar Guy

== Production ==
In November 1999, it was reported that MGM had acquired comedy spec script, A Guy Thing, written by Greg Glienna and Pete Schwaba for David Ladd to produce. (Note: Larry Miller, who played Wedding Minister Ferris was missing from the end credits.)

Principal photography took place from November 2001 to February 2002, in Seattle, Washington and Vancouver, British Columbia, Canada.

The release date was originally slated for August 23, 2002 and then September 20, 2002 hence having a copyright date of 2002 in the credits, before finally being released January 17, 2003 in time for Valentine's Day.

== Release ==
The film debuted at #7 in the U.S. box office, taking USD 6,988,749 in its opening weekend, before falling to #11 the following week.

== Reception ==
On Rotten Tomatoes, it has a 25% approval rating based on 103 reviews, with an average score of 4.1/10 and a consensus: "Wasting the talent of its leads, A Guy Thing is a predictable romantic comedy that relies on cheap laughs." On Metacritic the film has a score of 27% based on reviews from 29 critics, indicating "generally unfavorable" reviews. Audiences surveyed by CinemaScore gave the film a grade "B−" on scale of A to F.

Dennis Harvey of Variety said that the film "does get slightly better as it goes along" but suggested that the multiple rewrites polished any creativity or originality out of the script.
