= Aquarians =

2017 American drama film

- Directed by: Michael M. McGuire
- Written by: Michael M. McGuire
- Starring: Chandler Massey; Shane Coffey; Tracey Fairaway; Richard Riehle; James DeVita; Colleen Madden; Pete Schwaba
- Distributed by: Indie Rights
- Release date: 2017
- Running time: 103 minutes
- Country: United States
- Language: English

Aquarians is a 2017 American independent drama film written and directed by Michael M. McGuire. The film stars Chandler Massey and Shane Coffey as estranged brothers who reconnect after a family tragedy in rural Wisconsin.

== Plot ==
Aquarians follows Daniel, a seminary student who returns to his hometown to serve as a deacon at his family's church. While home, he reconnects with his estranged brother Jacob, who lives a reclusive life in the surrounding wilderness. As the brothers confront past trauma and loss, their relationship is tested by differing ideas about faith, responsibility, and forgiveness.

== Cast ==
- Chandler Massey as Daniel
- Shane Coffey as Jacob
- Tracey Fairaway as Nicole
- Richard Riehle as Father Rob
- Melissa Nearman as Jennifer
- Colleen Madden as Sally Larsen
- James DeVita as Bart Sheraski
- Pete Schwaba as Tom Marx

== Production ==
The film was written and directed by American Film Institute graduate Michael M. McGuire and was shot on location in Wisconsin.

== Release ==
The film was released in the United States in 2017 and later received a digital release on Amazon Prime Video on December 21, 2018. The digital release was handled by Indie Rights.

The film won the award for Best Wisconsin Feature at the Beloit International Film Festival. Chandler Massey received a nomination for Best Performance at the Twin Cities Film Fest, where the film was also runner-up for the Audience Award during its world premiere screening.

== Reception ==
Aquarians received mixed to positive reviews from critics. Writing for Film Threat, Alex Saveliev described the film as a restrained, wintertime drama about forgiveness and faith, praising its atmosphere and the performances of its two leads.

Writing for ScreenAnarchy, Sebastian Zavala Kahn called the film "heartfelt and sincere", while noting that its ambition occasionally leads to unresolved narrative threads.

== See also ==
- Film industry in Wisconsin
