= Andrea Boccadoro =

Italian British composer

- Occupation: Composer
- Known for: Film, television, and video game scores

Andrea Boccadoro is an Italian British composer for film, television, and video games known for Honey Bunch and Violation.

== Early life and education ==
Boccadoro was born in Rome, Italy. He studied philosophy at Sapienza University of Rome and classical composition at the Luisa D'Annunzio Conservatory in Pescara. In 2013, he relocated to London, where he completed a Master of Music degree in Composition for Screen at the Royal College of Music.

== Career ==
Boccadoro has composed music for film, television, and video games. His screen credits include the feature films Violation (2020), The Legionnaire (2021), After the Fire (2023), Home Education (2023), and Honey Bunch (2025).

In 2018, Boccadoro was selected as a participant in Berlinale Talents.

The score for Violation was noted in press coverage for its restrained and effective contribution to the film's atmosphere.

He also composed music for the Amazon documentary series Veleno (2021).

In video games, he composed music for Astrologaster (2019) and Card Shark (2022).

== Awards and recognition ==
Boccadoro has received awards and nominations for his work, as listed by IMDb.

== Selected filmography ==
=== Film ===
- Speaking in Tongues (2018) (composer)
- Violation (2020) (composer)
- The Legionnaire (2021) (composer)
- The Temptation (2022) (composer, with Gabriele Roberto)
- After the Fire (2023) (composer)
- 37: The Shadow and the Prey (2023) (composer)
- Home Education (film) (2023) (composer)
- Honey Bunch (2025) (composer)
- Concrete Music (2027) (composer, music director)

=== Documentary ===
- Sergio Marchionne (2021) (composer)
- Viareggio 1969 (2023) (composer)
- Il Perugino (2023) (composer, with Gabriele Roberto)

=== Television ===
- Veleno (2021) (composer)
- Benidorm Is Murder (2026) (composer)

=== Video games ===
- Astrologaster (2019) (composer)
- Card Shark (2022) (composer)
