= Reigns: Her Majesty =

2017 strategy video game

- Developer: Nerial
- Publisher: Devolver Digital
- Designer: François Alliot
- Programmer: François Alliot
- Artist: Arnaud De Bock
- Writer: Leigh Alexander
- Composers: Jim Guthrie; J. J. Ipsen
- Engine: Unity
- Platforms: Android iOS; Linux macOS; Microsoft Windows; Nintendo Switch
- Release: Android, iOS, Linux, macOS, Windows; 6 December 2017; Nintendo Switch; 20 September 2018
- Genre: Strategy
- Mode: Single-player

Reigns: Her Majesty is a strategy video game developed by Nerial and published by Devolver Digital. The game is a standalone sequel to 2016's Reigns. Set in a fictional renaissance world, it places the player in the role of a monarch who rules the queendom by accepting or rejecting suggestions from advisors. The game was released digitally for Android, iOS, Linux, macOS and Microsoft Windows in December 2017. Reigns: Her Majesty and its predecessor were released for Nintendo Switch, under the collective title Reigns: Kings & Queens, in September 2018.

A third entry in the Reigns series, Reigns: Game of Thrones, was released in October 2018.

== Gameplay ==
The base gameplay is the same as in Reigns, but instead of playing as a medieval king, the player assumes the role of a queen. The player swipes left or right on a card depicting an advisor, in order to accept or reject their suggestion. Each decision will have a consequence, changing the balance between the four pillars of the society: the church, the people, the military, and the economy. The queen's reign ends whenever one of the four metrics becomes too high or too low, and the game continues with the player controlling their heir. There are between 1200 and 1300 different cards in the game, up from 800 in the original game.

Throughout the course of the game, the player may experience different kinds of events, which are scripted or caused by the player's decisions. Such events can have one-time or recurring effects on the game, such as causing the death of the next advisor if their suggestion is rejected.

A new gameplay element in Reigns: Her Majesty is the addition of items. The player can collect items throughout the game, and use them in certain situations. Items can bypass the choices offered and offer new options.

== Reception ==
Reception

Aggregate score
Aggregator	Score
Metacritic	PC: 81/100 iOS: 81/100

Review scores
Publication	Score
PC Gamer (US)	82%
Hardcore Gamer	4/5
GameSpace	8/10
TouchArcade	iOS: 5/5

The game has been described as "smart and surprising" sequel with "fun and minimalist" mechanics, and an "improved and captivating story", but critics have said that it suffers from repetition. It has been compared to services such as Tinder because the player makes decisions by swiping left or right.

The Verge felt the game allowed experimentation throughout different lives, and liked how progress carried over through playthroughs, "Majesty does a remarkable job at making each life feel unique, and giving you enough information to feel at least somewhat in control of your destiny". Kotaku praised the game's approach to approaching sexism, saying "Her Majesty isn't one of those stories about women that's meant to empower them by showing a rise out of adversity. It's more a fun friend, laughing with you about all the irritating little things that happen to you when you're a woman that other people sometimes don't believe". Game Informer disliked the gameplay, writing, "Her Majesty has a couple of interesting moments but largely follows the formula of the first game and fails to evolve into something special".

=== Accolades ===
Year	Award	Category	Result	Ref.
2018	Game Developers Choice Awards	Best Mobile Game	Nominated	
2018	14th British Academy Games Awards	British Game	Nominated	
2018	Develop Awards	Writing or Narrative Design	Nominated	
2018	Golden Joystick Awards	Best Storytelling	Nominated	
2018	Golden Joystick Awards	Mobile Game of the Year	Nominated	
2019	Writers' Guild of Great Britain Awards	Best Writing in a Video Game	Won	
