= Mary Sweeney =

American film editor

- Born: Madison, Wisconsin, U.S.
- Occupations: Film producer; director; writer; film editor
- Years active: 1983–present
- Spouse: David Lynch (m. 2006; div. 2007)
- Children: 1
- Awards: BAFTA Award for Best Editing; 2001 Mulholland Drive

Mary Sweeney is an American director, writer, film editor and film producer. She was briefly married to American film director David Lynch, with whom she collaborated for 20 years. Sweeney worked with Lynch on several films and television series, most notably the original Twin Peaks series (1990), Lost Highway (1997), The Straight Story (1999), Mulholland Drive (2001), and Inland Empire (2006). Sweeney is the Dino and Martha De Laurentiis Endowed Professor in the Writing Division of the School of Cinematic Arts at the University of Southern California. She was formerly the chair of the Film Independent board of directors.

In 2002, she won the BAFTA Award for Best Editing for her work on Mulholland Drive.

== Biography ==
=== Early life ===
Born in 1953, Sweeney graduated from the University of Wisconsin, Madison with a BA in history. She earned a Certificate of Fine Arts from the Corcoran School of Fine Arts in Washington, D.C. After completing a master's degree in cinema studies at New York University, Sweeney worked her way up the ranks of film editing in New York and San Francisco, on films such as Reds by Warren Beatty, Tender Mercies by Bruce Beresford, Places in the Heart by Robert Benton, Little Drummer Girl by George Roy Hill, and The Mean Season by Phil Boursos.

=== Collaborations with David Lynch ===
From 1985 to 2006, Sweeney collaborated as producer, writer, script supervisor and editor with filmmaker David Lynch from Blue Velvet to Inland Empire. Her editing credits include Blue Velvet (1986), Wild at Heart (1990), Twin Peaks (1990), Industrial Symphony (1991), Twin Peaks: Fire Walk with Me (1992), On the Air (1992), Hotel Room (1993), Lost Highway (1997), The Straight Story (1999), Mulholland Drive (2001) and Baraboo (2009). Sweeney is a consulting producer/writer on Matthew Weiner's anthology series The Romanoffs.

She won the British Academy Award for Best Editing for Mulholland Drive. As producer, she won the César Award for Best Foreign Film, and the New York Film Critics Circle Award for Best Film. She developed, produced, wrote and edited The Straight Story, for which Richard Farnsworth received an Academy Award nomination. As a producer, she won the European Film Award For Best Foreign Film, and the film received four nominations for the Independent Spirit Awards: Best Film, Best Director, Best First Screenplay and Best Actor. Her producing credits date from 1995 and include Lost Highway, The Straight Story, Mulholland Drive and Inland Empire, directed by Lynch, and Baraboo (2009), her directorial debut based on her original screenplay.

Sweeney continued to write screenplays while collaborating with Lynch. These include The Surprise Party for Paramount Pictures, and Two Knives, a martial arts film for director Wong Kar-Wai and Fox Searchlight Pictures.

=== Filmmaking ===
Sweeney wrote, directed, produced and edited a short silent film, In the Eye Abides the Heart, filmed in Buenos Aires, which premiered at the 2006 Venice Film Festival, and then played the international festival circuit. In 2009, she went on to write, direct, produce and edit her debut feature, Baraboo, which premiered at the Edinburgh Film Festival and won Best First Feature awards at the Galway Film Fleadh and the Wisconsin Film Festival.

Sweeney had been on the board of directors of Film Independent for over two decades since 2000, and was elected chair of the board in 2013, and served nine years in that position before stepping down. Film Independent is a non-profit arts organization that produces the Independent Spirit Awards, the Los Angeles Film Festival, and the Film Independent Series at LACMA.

In 2003, Sweeney joined the faculty of the Division of Writing for Screen and Television in the University of Southern California's School of Cinematic Arts. She was installed as the Dino and Martha De Laurentiis Endowed Professor in 2012.

=== 2010–present ===
Between 2010 and 2015, Sweeney was a Fulbright Film Specialist and traveled for the State Department on Fulbright grants to Jordan, Kazakhstan, Laos, Myanmar and Cuba to mentor filmmakers in those countries.

She is vice president and founding member of the Desert X non-profit's board of directors. Desert X is a site-specific art exhibition in the Coachella Valley.

She is a member of the Academy of Motion Picture Arts and Sciences, British Academy of Film and Television Arts, Directors Guild of America, and Writers Guild of America, where she is on the WGA Independent Writers Committee.

== Awards and nominations ==
- 2000: The Straight Story (nominated) Independent Spirit Award Best Film (shared with Neal Edelstein) and Best First Screenplay (shared with John Roach)
- 2002: Mulholland Drive (won) BAFTA Award for Best Editing
- 2002: Mulholland Drive (nominated) AFI Film Award – AFI Movie of the Year (shared with producers Alain Sarde, Neal Edelstein, Michael Polaire, Tony Krantz)

== Selected filmography ==
Year	Title	Editor	Producer	Writer	Note
1986	Blue Velvet	Assistant	No	No	
1990	Twin Peaks	Yes	No	No	TV Series, Season two only; Also Script supervisor
1990	Wild at Heart	Assistant	No	No	Also Script supervisor
1992	Twin Peaks: Fire Walk with Me	Yes	No	No	
1993	Hotel Room	Yes	No	No	TV Series
1994	Nadja	No	Yes	No	
1997	Lost Highway	Yes	Yes	No	
1999	The Straight Story	Yes	Yes	Yes	
2001	Mulholland Drive	Yes	Yes	No	
2006	Inland Empire	No	Yes	No	
2009	Baraboo	Yes	Yes	Yes	Also Director
