= Reigns: Game of Thrones =

2018 strategy video game

- Developer: Nerial
- Publisher: Devolver Digital
- Designer: François Alliot
- Programmer: François Alliot
- Artists: Arnaud De Bock; Irene Navarro
- Writers: François Alliot; Tamara Alliot; Leigh Alexander
- Composer: Ryan Ike
- Engine: Unity
- Platforms: Android; iOS; Linux; macOS; Microsoft Windows; Nintendo Switch
- Release: Android, iOS, Linux, macOS, Windows; 18 October 2018; Nintendo Switch; 11 April 2019
- Genre: Strategy
- Mode: Single-player

Reigns: Game of Thrones is a 2018 strategy game developed by Nerial and published by Devolver Digital. The third instalment in and a spin-off from the Reigns series, it is based on the television series Game of Thrones. Reigns: Game of Thrones was released in October 2018 for Android, iOS, Linux, macOS, and Microsoft Windows. A version for Nintendo Switch was released in April 2019.

== Gameplay ==
Reigns: Game of Thrones plays similarly to its predecessors. Described as a "swipe 'em up", the game allows the player to be one of the principals from the Game of Thrones universe, including Cersei Lannister, Jon Snow, Daenerys Targaryen, Tyrion Lannister, and Sansa Stark. In the game, the player is continually presented with questions regarding the ruling of their kingdom, where each has a binary choice: swipe left to accept or right to decline the proposal in question. Every choice can have an impact on four factors: military strength, religious favour, domestic popularity, and state wealth. Each card indicates which factors would be affected by either decision, but not how strongly or whether the effect would be positive or negative. If either factor rises to its maximum or falls to its minimum, the player's character dies and is succeeded by another character. The player begins the game as Daenerys Targaryen and progressively unlocks other characters throughout the gameplay. With each character, the player encounters different challenges based on that character's story arc. The game also includes minigames, such as jousting and tavern brawling.

== Development ==
Before he created Reigns: Game of Thrones, François Alliot, the founder of video game developer Nerial, had been a fan of Game of Thrones since he read the original books by George R. R. Martin, and had also enjoyed the eponymous TV series. When he pitched the original Reigns to publisher Devolver Digital, Alliot described the game as "Tinder meets Game of Thrones"; Devolver Digital later passed this idea on to HBO, the company behind the Game of Thrones TV series, to agree on a licensing deal.

The writing behind Reigns: Game of Thrones was primarily done by Alliot and his wife, Tamara. Leigh Alexander, previously the writer of predecessor Reigns: Her Majesty, provided the writing for the character Cersei Lannister. All writing was worked out in association with HBO to ensure that it stayed true to the original material. Due to the element of choice, the player is able to alter the outcome of events that are canon in the Game of Thrones TV series. To cope with the issue, the game's lore states that all events were visions of the character Melisandre, through which the game creates a "what if?" scenario.

=== Release ===
Reigns: Game of Thrones was revealed by publisher Devolver Digital on 23 August 2018, through a trailer published on YouTube. Coinciding with the reveal, Devolver Digital announced that game would be released on 18 October that year, for Android via Google Play, for iOS via the App Store, and for personal computers (Linux, macOS and Microsoft Windows) via Steam. Pre-orders on all three distribution services were launched alongside the announcement. The game was released across all targeted platforms on the intended date. A version of Reigns: Game of Thrones for Nintendo Switch was released on 11 April 2019 via the Nintendo eShop.

== Reception ==
=== Critical response ===
Reception

Aggregate score
Aggregator	Score
Metacritic	iOS: 84/100; NS: 74/100

Review scores
Publication	Score
Destructoid	7.5/10
GameSpot	8/10
Nintendo Life	NS: 8/10
Nintendo World Report	NS: 8/10
The Guardian	4/5

Reigns: Game of Thrones received "generally favourable" reviews, according to review aggregator website Metacritic.

Pocket Gamer praised how the game used information as the main means of progression "Secrets you discover at one edge of your nascent empire might well change the way you act with people at the other. The game is littered with tiny 'eureka' moments that push the plot along and drive you towards new goals". The Guardian liked how Reigns adapted the series' political drama, "Appropriately for a game based on Game of Thrones, death is swift and frequent, and quickly forgotten... It's quick-fire diplomacy, enlivened by random disasters and constant fleeting cameos from series' gigantic cast". GameSpot enjoyed the writing, "Despite each card consisting of a few sentences at most, characters are colorful, distinct, and full of personality. And although the subject matter is often serious, and the world brutal, the game manages to maintain an air of lightheartedness throughout". While liking the mini-games, Destructoid criticized the game for being too repetitive, "most decisions you have to make repeat with each of the different rulers... Not only does this level of repetition feel punishing when playing for long periods of time, but it also restricts the game from establishing a stronger, more cohesive narrative". Nintendo Life felt the game created an authentic Game of Thrones experience, "Reigns: Game of Thrones is about as close as you'll come to living the day-to-day life of a Westeros monarch, short of visiting the Seven Kingdoms for real".

=== Accolades ===
Reigns: Game of Thrones was nominated for "Best Mobile Game" at both The Game Awards 2018 and the Game Developers Choice Awards, and for "Mobile Game" at the 15th British Academy Games Awards.
