= Reigns (video game) =

2016 strategy game

- Developer: Nerial
- Publisher: Devolver Digital
- Designer: François Alliot
- Programmer: François Alliot
- Artist: Mieko Murakami
- Writer: François Alliot
- Composers: Disasterpeace; Mateo Lugo
- Engine: Unity
- Platforms: Android iOS; Linux macOS; Microsoft Windows; Nintendo Switch
- Release: Android, iOS, Linux, macOS, Windows; 11 August 2016; Nintendo Switch; 20 September 2018
- Genre: Strategy
- Mode: Single-player

Reigns is a 2016 strategy video game developed by Nerial and published by Devolver Digital. Players control a medieval king who they must help rule for as long as possible. The monarch receives petitions and questions from advisers, which are represented by cards. The player can choose between two responses to the adviser, which has an effect on one or more of the kingdom's four aspects. If one of the aspects becomes too unbalanced, the game ends and the player starts another reign with a new monarch. To win the game, the player must break a curse created by the Devil, who visits them across several reigns.

Nerial was inspired by the dating app Tinder while creating Reigns. Developer François Alliot managed the writing, which was influenced by the Oulipo French literary movement. The game was first released on 11 August 2016 for Android, iOS, Linux, macOS, and Windows. It received positive reviews from critics for its gameplay and presentation, though some said that it became repetitive over time. By August 2019, the game had sold two million copies.

Reigns inspired a video game franchise, beginning with a standalone sequel titled Reigns: Her Majesty, which was released in 2017. A game based on the Game of Thrones television series called Reigns: Game of Thrones was launched in 2018. A fourth game based in a science-fiction setting, titled Reigns: Beyond, was added in 2020. A fifth entry in the franchise called Reigns: Three Kingdoms was released for Netflix subscribers in 2022. A sixth entry, Reigns: The Witcher, based on the video game series, was released in 2026.

== Gameplay ==
Screenshot showing the player accepting a suggestion by moving the card to the right.

Reigns is a strategy video game. Players control a medieval king and must make decisions to make their tenure as monarch last as long as possible. Various advisers, represented by cards, approach the player with petitions and questions. The player chooses between two responses to the supplicant by moving their card to the left or right. For example, a player could accept a request by moving the card to the right, or reject it by moving it to the left.

Each decision has an effect on the power of one of the kingdom's four aspects: the army, the people, the church, and the king's wealth. These aspects are represented by meters that are filled and emptied based upon the player's decisions. For example, the player can provide assistance to a witch to fill the meter representing the people, at the cost of the church's power.

If any of the four meters becomes completely filled or empty, the player's reign ends and they experience a game over. Afterwards, the player starts as a new king and begins another reign. Completing tasks in each reign allows the player to unlock new cards, and some of these cards have effects that last over time, such as a crusade that is continued across multiple reigns. To win the game, the player must find a way to break a curse created by the Devil, who visits the monarch over several centuries; if the player does not find a way to break the curse before the Devil stops his visits, the game resets.

== Plot ==
The player character, an unnamed King appearing to be suffering from memory loss, meets a ghost called the Spirit of the Fallen. The spirit tells the King to be a wise and pragmatic ruler and to reign for as long as possible. After the King dies, he is reincarnated as a new ruler and encounters the spirit again, who tells him that they are both cursed to be reborn after death. After several reigns, the King is visited by the Devil in the year 666; the demon taunts the King, revealing that the monarch traded his soul centuries beforehand in exchange for eternal power, though the Devil was able to manipulate this wish by trapping him in a cycle of death and reincarnation. The Devil reappears in 1332, telling the King that there is no end to this cycle, and that he will visit the King a final time in the year 1998. Some time before that date arrives, the King meets a noblewoman called the Senator who knows of the bargain he made with the Devil. She tells him the only way to annul the deal is to force the Devil to attempt a task that he cannot fulfill.

The Devil arrives in 1998 and casts an enchantment on the King as a "parting gift" before disappearing forever, causing the next person to whom he says "Yes" to suffer a gruesome death. The ending depends on the character that the player uses the curse on. If the player uses the curse on the Spirit of the Fallen, the Devil reveals that the ghost is a reflection of the King's own soul and memories, and condemns the monarch to spiritual death by sending him to Hell. If the player uses the curse on any other mortal character, the spirit remarks that the cycle will never end and the King becomes trapped forever. If the player performs several optional tasks before the Devil arrives, the King can use the curse on an undead skeleton; the Devil discovers that it is impossible to kill the already-deceased monster, and is forced to release the King into the afterlife.

== Development ==
Reigns was developed by the London-based games studio Nerial. Developer François Alliot was considering leaving the games industry after several failed projects, and pitched the game's concept to publisher Devolver Digital. The company's associate Nigel Lowrie enjoyed the game's demo, presented it to the rest of the staff, and Devolver Digital arranged a publishing deal with Nerial. The developers were especially influenced by the dating app Tinder, which influenced the swiping gameplay. Alliot wanted to make a game that would "mock the way our societies tend to deal with complexity" and drew comparisons between the game and the Brexit referendum, opining that the Brexit decision was as simple as swiping a card but had lasting political consequences. The earliest version of the game placed the characters inside portraits, but the developers quickly substituted these paintings for cards, as they felt that players would be used to moving cards around, thereby removing the need for a formal tutorial.

The writing was designed to be quick and simple, which was in contrast to Alliot's usual style of writing with complex sentence structures. He introduced several subplots that ran parallel with the main narrative, and said that the writing of the cards was formatted to be a "short direct question, quick snappy answer, dire consequences". Alliot was particularly inspired by the Oulipo, a group of French writers who experimented with constrained writing. The plot centered on the Devil was introduced near the end, as Alliot needed a reason to explain why the characters repeated their dialogue, and to justify why the player would continue as a new king.

The soundtrack was composed by the chiptune composer Disasterpeace, and the art was created by Mieko Murakami. Reigns was featured at the AdventureX convention in December 2015. The game was released on 16 August 2016 for Android, iOS, Linux, macOS, and Windows. It was delayed from its planned release a week earlier due to problems with its translations. A port for Nintendo Switch was launched on 20 September 2018. Reigns sold two million copies by August 2019.

== Reception ==
Reception

Aggregate score
Aggregator	Score
Metacritic	iOS: 87/100; PC: 77/100

Review scores
Publication	Score
The Guardian	3/5
TouchArcade	5/5
Pocket Gamer	8/10
Gamezebo	4.5/5

According to the review aggregator website Metacritic, Reigns received "generally favorable" reviews for its iOS and PC versions. Reviewers generally considered Reigns a fun and unique strategy game. TouchArcade found its gameplay to be interesting and inventive, and Pocket Gamer said that it was "a clever subversion of strategy and casual mobile play that makes you laugh, cry, and think". In contrast, The Guardian felt that Reigns was more of a whimsical experience than a serious strategy game.

Critics debated the game's presentation. Rock Paper Shotgun said that it forced the player to alter their approach to rulership, as it changed him from being an idealist who wanted to make moral decisions, to a pragmatic monarch who would work to stay in power. Other reviewers opined that the game was about finding ways to balance the four aspects. TouchArcade said that the game was humorous and weird, adding that it embraced these elements through its premise and presentation.

The gameplay was positively received. TouchArcade praised the cards as a way to make the player feel like they were working to a larger goal through simple decisions. Gamezebo said that the game gave an interesting amount of weight behind each choice and would lead to overthinking. The Guardian felt that the simple controls with the cards were well-suited for mobile gameplay, but added that the binary style of the decisions limited the game's depth.

Some reviewers said that the gameplay felt repetitive. Gamezebo said that the game would become shallow despite its large number of scenarios. The Guardian found some of the cards to be poorly designed and confusing, and said that the repeating nature of some cards hurt the game's story-based main objective. In contrast, Rock Paper Shotgun said that Reigns did not feel repetitive despite its simple controls, as there were enough new cards being added that made the game fun. The game won the international competition at the 2017 Ludicious convention. It was nominated for "Best Mobile Game" of Unity Awards 2016, and "Use of Narrative" of Develop Awards 2016. In 2017, Reigns was nominated for "Mobile Game of the Year" at the 20th Annual D.I.C.E. Awards and for "Best Mobile/Handheld Game" at the 17th Game Developers Choice Awards.

== Legacy ==
Nerial released a standalone sequel to Reigns titled Reigns: Her Majesty in December 2017. The game sees players take control of a queen consort instead of a king. Her Majesty received "generally favorable reviews" according to Metacritic. A third installment in the franchise called Reigns: Game of Thrones was launched in October 2018. The game is based upon the Game of Thrones television series, and was created as part of a licensing deal between Devolver Digital and HBO. It received "generally favorable reviews". A fourth installment called Reigns: Beyond was released for Apple Arcade on 6 November 2020, and for Windows and Nintendo Switch on 17 April 2024. Beyond centers around a group of aliens in a rock band as they travel the galaxy to look for venues to play at. It received "mixed or average reviews". A fifth game titled Reigns: Three Kingdoms was released for Netflix subscribers in November 2022. Three Kingdoms was primarily influenced by the Romance of the Three Kingdoms, and includes a combat and multiplayer system. It received "mixed or average reviews". A sixth entry, Reigns: The Witcher, based on the video game series, was released on 25 February 2026, receiving "generally favorable reviews".
