= Lance Barber =

American actor (born 1973)

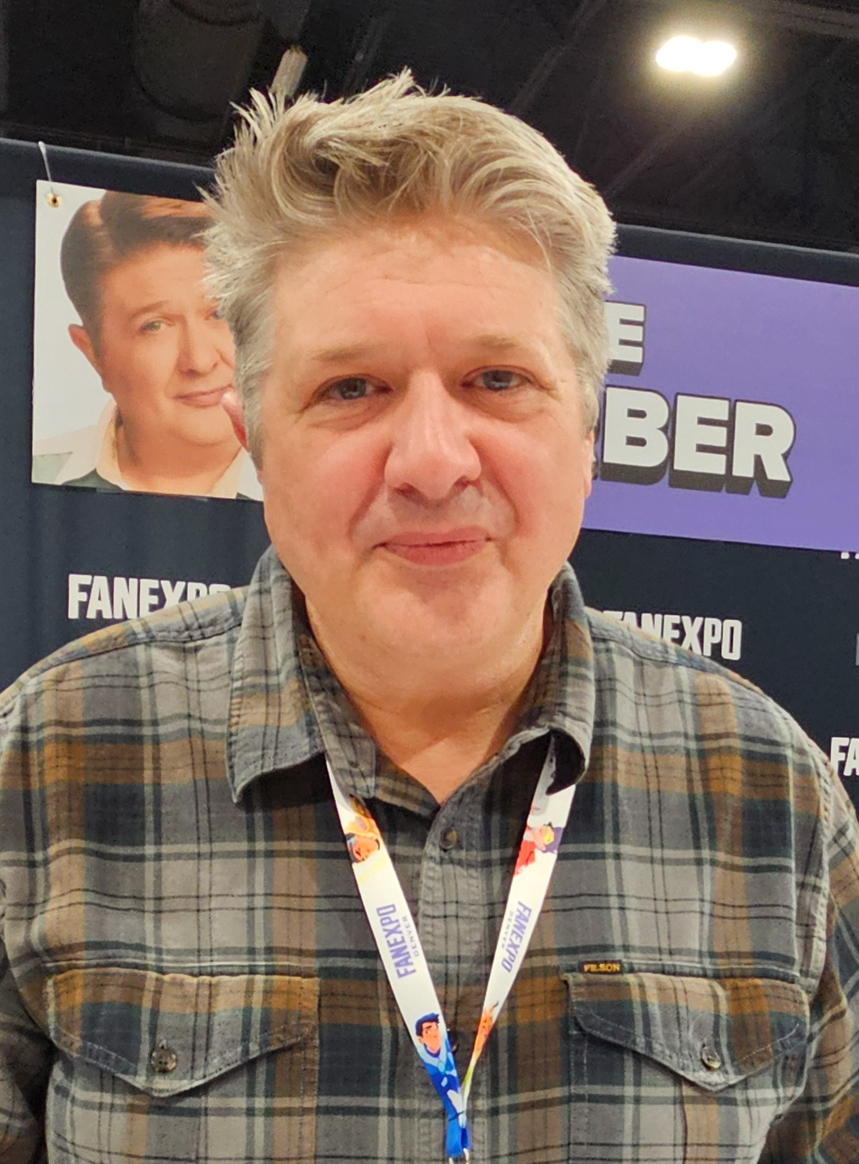
- Barber in 2026
- Born: 1972 or 1973 (age 52–53); Battle Creek, Michigan, U.S.
- Education: Kellogg Community College
- Occupation: Actor
- Years active: 1998–present
- Known for: Young Sheldon, It's Always Sunny in Philadelphia, The Comeback; (more...)
- Spouse: Aliza Barber
- Children: 2

Lance Barber (born 1972 or 1973) is an American actor. He gained recognition for his main role as Paulie G on the HBO sitcom The Comeback (2005; 2014; 2026), which was followed with a starring role in the film The Godfather of Green Bay (2005).

In the 2010s, Barber had recurring roles as Bill Ponderosa on the FX and FXX sitcom It's Always Sunny in Philadelphia (2010–2013; 2015–2018) and Lucas on the MTV television series Faking It (2014–2016). He received renewed attention for his main role as George Cooper Sr. on the CBS sitcom Young Sheldon (2017–2024).

== Early life ==
Barber at Pennfield High School in 1987

Barber was born and raised in Battle Creek, Michigan, and developed an interest in acting at the age of seven, after seeing a performance of Grease at the Barn Theatre. He acted at Pennfield High School, from which he graduated in 1991, and performed in school productions from Kellogg Community College while earning his associate degree.

== Career ==
After a year at the Barn Theatre, Barber moved to Chicago and spent five years working his way up in The Second City improvisational comedy troupe. He then moved to Los Angeles and had his first television role in On the Spot, an improv sketch show that ran for five episodes on The WB in 2003. He credits his breakthrough to the 2005 HBO series The Comeback with Lisa Kudrow, in which he played Paulie G., a television writer. In 2010, he landed the recurring role of Bill Ponderosa on FX's It's Always Sunny in Philadelphia. He reprised his role as Paulie G. when HBO brought back The Comeback in 2014. He also appeared in episodes of How I Met Your Mother, Gilmore Girls, Californication, Monk, The Mentalist, and Grey's Anatomy.

Barber played Jimmy Speckerman, who bullied Leonard Hofstadter at high school, in one episode of The Big Bang Theory. He was cast as George Cooper Sr., father of Sheldon Cooper, in the spin-off Young Sheldon that premiered in 2017, and mentioned in an interview that some fans were confused by his different roles in the two related series. Barber also played Cooper in "The VCR Illumination", a 2018 episode of the parent show's twelfth season; the character is deceased in the series but appears on an old VHS tape that Sheldon plays. In 2025 and 2026, he reprised his role as George Cooper Sr. in cameos of the Young Sheldon spinoff Georgie & Mandy's First Marriage.

== Personal life ==
Barber lives in Los Angeles with his wife Aliza, who is a chef, and their two children.

== Filmography ==
=== Film ===
| Year | Title | Role | Notes |
|---|---|---|---|
| 2002 | Tenfold | Dunken Boy | |
| 2002 | Like Mike | Director in Commercial | Uncredited |
| 2003 | Patching Cabbage | Ryan | Short film |
| 2005 | Bad Meat | Buddy | |
| 2005 | The Godfather of Green Bay | Kenny Caruso | |
| 2005 | The Poet of Canis | The Poet | Short film |
| 2006 | For Your Consideration | Dinkie | |
| 2006 | Breakdown | Logan Conner | Short film |
| 2006 | The Lather Effect | Paul Helling | |
| 2008 | Shades of Ray | Karaoke Singer | |
| 2008 | Leatherheads | Toledo Referee | |
| 2010 | Dead Cat | – | Short film |
| 2010 | Penny | Frank | Short film |
| 2013 | Gangster Squad | Comanche | |
| 2017 | Never Seen You Shine So Bright | Neil | Short film |
| 2021 | Raunch and Roll | Crash | |
| 2023 | Fool's Paradise | Side Kick | |

=== Television ===
| Year | Title | Role | Notes |
|---|---|---|---|
| 2001 | ER | Howard Norden | Episode: "Start All Over Again" |
| 2001, 2006 | Gilmore Girls | The Man at Inn / Hugo Gray | 2 episodes |
| 2002 | What I Like About You | Phone Guy | Episode: "Spa Day" |
| 2003 | On the Spot | Ensemble Player | Recurring role |
| 2004 | Come to Papa | Phillip | Episode: "The Crush" |
| 2004 | Faking the Video | Billy the Fake Director | Episode: "Two PA's Left" |
| 2004 | Yes, Dear | Man | Episode: "Who Done It?" |
| 2005 | Joey | Steve | Episode: "Joey and the High School Friend" |
| 2005, 2014, 2026 | The Comeback | Paulie G. | 22 episodes |
| 2006 | Thick and Thin | Kevin | Episode: "Mary Moves On" |
| 2006 | Untitled Patricia Heaton Project | Pete | Television film |
| 2007 | The Hill | Eric | Television film |
| 2007 | Californication | Nick Lowry | 3 episodes |
| 2007 | Insatiable | Jerry Marinelli | Episode: "Pilot" |
| 2008 | The Mentalist | Daniel Cardeira | Episode: "Red-Handed" |
| 2008 | The Middleman | Johnny John | Episode: "The Cursed Tuba Contingency" |
| 2009 | Single White Millionaire | Seth Mortin | Television film |
| 2009 | CSI: Miami | Al Wayons | Episode: "Bad Seed" |
| 2009 | Monk | Bill the Deliveryman | Episode: "Mr. Monk Is Someone Else" |
| 2010 | Justified | Frank | Episode: "Long in the Tooth" |
| 2010 | United States of Tara | Sully | 2 episodes |
| 2010 | Grey's Anatomy | Phil | Episode: "Suicide Is Painless" |
| 2010 | Men of a Certain Age | Hardware Store Manager | Episode: "Father's Fraternity" |
| 2010–2013, 2015–2018 | It's Always Sunny in Philadelphia | Bill Ponderosa | Recurring role |
| 2011 | Harry's Law | David Kerwin | Episode: "Purple Hearts" |
| 2011, 2018 | The Big Bang Theory | Jimmy Speckerman / George Cooper Sr. | 2 episodes |
| 2012 | Baby Daddy | Tommy | Episode: "The Daddy Whisperer" |
| 2012 | The Soul Man | Mr. Richardson | Episode: "Pastor Interference" |
| 2012 | How I Met Your Mother | Guard #1 | Episode: "The Magician's Code Part 2" |
| 2012 | Key and Peele | Cop | Episode: "Episode #1.2" |
| 2013 | Timms Valley | – | Episode: "2nd Executive" |
| 2013 | The Crazy Ones | Clyde | Episode: "Models Love Magic" |
| 2013 | Franklin & Bash | Teddy Lazlow | Episode: "Control" |
| 2013 | Whitney | Nate | Episode: "Sorry!" |
| 2014 | Masters of Sex | Larry | Episode: "One for the Money, Two for the Show" |
| 2014 | Garfunkel and Oates | Drew | Episode: "Speechless" |
| 2014 | Hot in Cleveland | Tyler | Episode: "Straight Outta Cleveland" |
| 2014 | Bob's Burgers | Justgrillin' (voice) | Episode: "Uncle Teddy" |
| 2014 | We Got Next | Jay | Television film |
| 2014–2016 | Faking It | Lucas / Karma's Dad | Recurring role |
| 2015 | Dr. Ken | Phil Stockton | Episode: "The Master Scheduler" |
| 2016 | Brooklyn Nine-Nine | Patrick | Episode: "Captain Latvia" |
| 2016, 2017 | Black-ish | Dr. Gabler | 2 episodes |
| 2017 | All Hail King Julien | Bruce (voice) | Episode: "One More Cup" |
| 2017–2024 | Young Sheldon | George Cooper Sr. | Main role |
| 2023–2025 | Big City Greens | Frank / TV Announcer (voice) | Recurring role |
| 2025, 2026 | Georgie & Mandy's First Marriage | George Cooper Sr. | 2 episodes |
