= List of Big City Greens episodes =

Big City Greens is an American animated sitcom created by Chris and Shane Houghton that premiered on Disney Channel on June 18, 2018. The series features the voices of Chris Houghton, Marieve Herington, Bob Joles, Artemis Pebdani, Zeno Robinson, Wendi McLendon-Covey, and Anna Akana.

== Series overview ==
Season	Segments	Episodes	Originally released	
Season	Segments	Episodes	First released	Last released
1	58	30	June 18, 2018	March 9, 2019
2	58	30	November 16, 2019	April 3, 2021
3	36	20	October 9, 2021	March 25, 2023
4	58	30	September 23, 2023	August 9, 2025
Film			June 6, 2024	
5	TBA	30	August 21, 2026	TBA

== Episodes ==
=== Season 1 (2018–19) ===
The first season of Big City Greens consists of 30 episodes (58 segments) which are ordered below by their original broadcast order, and not by production number or chronological order on Disney+.

No. overall	No. in season	Title	Directed by	Written and storyboarded by	Story by	Original release date	Prod. code	U.S. viewers (millions)
1	1	"Space Chicken"	Chris & Shane Houghton	Written by : Chris & Shane Houghton; Storyboarded by : Chris Houghton	Chris & Shane Houghton	June 18, 2018	101	0.68
1	1	"Steak Night"	Monica Ray	Cheyenne Curtis & Caldwell Tanner	Kylie Condon	June 18, 2018	101	0.68
2	2	"Cricket Versus"	Matt Braly	Amy Hudkins & Jonathan Wallach	Shane Houghton	June 19, 2018	102	0.63
2	2	"Blue Tater"	Monica Ray	Aaron Austin & Chris Pianka	Michael McCafferty	June 19, 2018	102	0.63
3	3	"Swimming Fool"	Matt Braly & Tiffany Ford	Charlie Gavin & Anna O'Brian	Carson Montgomery	June 20, 2018	103	0.66
3	3	"Tilly's Goat"	Matt Braly	Amy Hudkins & Jonathan Wallach	Carson Montgomery	June 20, 2018	103	0.66
4	4	"Cricketsitter"	Monica Ray	Charlie Gavin & Anna O'Brian	Jennifer Keene	June 21, 2018	106	0.79
4	4	"Backflip Bill"	Monica Ray	Amy Hudkins & Jonathan Wallach	Kenny Byerly & Kylie Condon	June 21, 2018	106	0.79
5	5	"Gramma's License"	Matt Braly & Tiffany Ford	Cheyenne Curtis & Caldwell Tanner	Kenny Byerly	June 22, 2018	104	0.73
5	5	"Bear Trapped"	Chris Houghton	Matt Braly & Monica Ray	Carson Montgomery	June 22, 2018	104	0.73
6	6	"Photo Op"	Tiffany Ford	Charlie Gavin & Anna O'Brian	Carson Montgomery	June 25, 2018	108	0.72
6	6	"Remy Rescue"	Monica Ray	Ben Adams & Rebecca Schauer	Kenny Byerly	June 25, 2018	108	0.72
7	7	"Gridlocked"	Monica Ray	Cheyenne Curtis & Caldwell Tanner	Shane Houghton	June 27, 2018	105	0.73
7	7	"Mama Bird"	Tiffany Ford	Amy Hudkins & Jonathan Wallach	Jennifer Keene	June 27, 2018	105	0.73
8	8	"Welcome Home"	Matt Braly	Chris Houghton	Shane Houghton	July 2, 2018	107	0.67
8	8	"Raccooned"	Monica Ray	Aaron Austin, Monica Ekabutr & Chris Pianka	Shane Houghton	July 2, 2018	107	0.67
9	9	"Fill Bill"	Monica Ray	Aaron Austin & Chris Pianka	Kenny Byerly & Jennifer Keene	July 9, 2018 (Note: On Disney Channel in Germany, "Fill Bill" aired on July 5, 2018, and "Critterball Crisis" aired on July 6, 2018.)	109	0.67
9	9	"Critterball Crisis"	Monica Ray	Ben Adams & Rebecca Schauer	Kenny Byerly	July 9, 2018	109	0.67
10	10	"Parade Day"	Monica Ray	Cheyenne Curtis & Caldwell Tanner	Kenny Byerly	July 11, 2018	110	0.66
10	10	"DIY Guys"	Monica Ray	Amy Hudkins & Jonathan Wallach	Carson Montgomery	July 11, 2018	110	0.66
11	11	"Gargoyle Gals"	Anna O'Brian	Charlie Gavin & Anna O'Brian	Kenny Byerly	July 16, 2018	111	0.59
11	11	"Supermarket Scandal"	Matt Braly & Tiffany Ford	Ben Adams & Rebecca Schauer	Kenny Byerly	July 16, 2018	111	0.59
12	12	"Barry Cuda"	Matt Braly & Tiffany Ford	Aaron Austin & Chris Pianka	Carson Montgomery	July 18, 2018	112	0.59
12	12	"Suite Retreat"	Tiffany Ford	Ben Adams & Rebecca Schauer	Jennifer Keene	July 18, 2018	112	0.59
13	13	"Family Legacy"	Natasha Kline	Cheyenne Curtis & Caldwell Tanner	Kenny Byerly & Michael McCafferty	July 23, 2018	113	0.60
13	13	"Paint Misbehavin'"	Chris Houghton	Katie Aldworth & Rebecca Schauer	Jennifer Keene	July 23, 2018	113	0.60
14	14	"Rated Cricket"	Natasha Kline	Aaron Austin & Chris Pianka	Carson Montgomery	July 25, 2018	114	0.57
14	14	"Homeshare Hoedown"	Monica Ray	Katie Aldworth & Rebecca Schauer	Jennifer Keene	July 25, 2018	114	0.57
15	15	"Cricket's Shoes"	Natasha Kline	Cheyenne Curtis & Caldwell Tanner	Shane Houghton	July 30, 2018	116	0.62
15	15	"Feud Fight"	Natasha Kline	Amy Hudkins & Jonathan Wallach	Kenny Byerly & Michael McCafferty	July 30, 2018	116	0.62
16	16	"Breaking News"	Natasha Kline	Charlie Gavin & Anna O'Brian	Carson Montgomery	August 1, 2018	117	0.65
16	16	"Cyberbullies"	Monica Ray	Aaron Austin & Chris Pianka	Kenny Byerly	August 1, 2018	117	0.65
17	17	"Tilly Tour"	Monica Ray	Amy Hudkins & Jonathan Wallach	Jennifer Keene	August 6, 2018	118	0.63
17	17	"Dinner Party"	Natasha Kline	Katie Aldworth & Rebecca Schauer	Kenny Byerly & Michael McCafferty	August 6, 2018	118	0.63
18	18	"Coffee Quest"	Natasha Kline	Written by : Kenny Byerly; Storyboarded by : Aaron Austin & Chris Pianka	Kenny Byerly	August 8, 2018	120	0.63
18	18	"Phoenix Rises"	Monica Ray	Katie Aldworth & Rebecca Schauer	Shane Houghton	August 8, 2018	120	0.63
19	19	"Blood Moon"	Monica Ray	Charlie Gavin, Amy Hudkins, Anna O'Brian & Jonathan Wallach	Carson Montgomery	October 6, 2018	115	0.54
20	20	"Big Deal"	Monica Ray	Kiana Khansmith & Caldwell Tanner	Carson Montgomery	November 3, 2018	119	0.56
20	20	"Forbidden Feline"	Monica Ray	Ian Mutchler & Rebecca Schauer	Jennifer Keene	November 3, 2018	119	0.56
21	21	"Uncaged"	Natasha Kline	Charlie Gavin, Amy Hudkins, Anna O'Brian & Jonathan Wallach	Kenny Byerly	January 11, 2019	121	0.93
22	22	"Harvest Dinner"	Natasha Kline	Amy Hudkins & Jonathan Wallach	Kenny Byerly	January 12, 2019	123	0.46
22	22	"Winner Winner"	Monica Ray	Caroline Director & Rebecca Schauer	Carson Montgomery	January 12, 2019	123	0.46
23	23	"Night Bill"	Natasha Kline	Cheyenne Curtis & Caldwell Tanner	Michael McCafferty	January 19, 2019	122	0.51
23	23	"Cheap Snake"	Monica Ray	Charlie Gavin & Anna O'Brian	Carson Montgomery	January 19, 2019	122	0.51
24	24	"Hiya Henry"	Natasha Kline	Charlie Gavin & Anna O'Brian	Lacy Dyer & Julia Layton	January 26, 2019	124	0.57
24	24	"People Watching"	Monica Ray	Caldwell Tanner & Kiana Khansmith	Lacy Dyer & Julia Layton	January 26, 2019	124	0.57
25	25	"Valentine's Dance"	Natasha Kline	Amy Hudkins & Jonathan Wallach	Kenny Byerly	February 2, 2019	127	0.62
25	25	"Green Streets"	Monica Ray	Megan Boyd & Rebecca Schauer	Lacy Dyer & Julia Layton	February 2, 2019	127	0.62
26	26	"Hurty Tooth"	Monica Ray	Megan Boyd & Rebecca Schauer	Chris Houghton	February 9, 2019	125	0.60
26	26	"Sleepover Sisters"	Natasha Kline	Amy Hudkins & Jonathan Wallach	Lacy Dyer & Julia Layton	February 9, 2019	125	0.60
27	27	"Trailer Trouble"	Monica Ray	Kiana Khansmith & Caldwell Tanner	Carson Montgomery	February 16, 2019	126	0.54
27	27	"Mansion Madness"	Natasha Kline	Charlie Gavin & Anna O'Brian	Carson Montgomery	February 16, 2019	126	0.54
28	28	"Park Pandemonium"	Natasha Kline	Charlie Gavin & Anna O'Brian	Lacy Dyer & Julia Layton	February 23, 2019	128	0.54
28	28	"Cricket's Biscuits"	Monica Ray	Kiana Khansmith & Caldwell Tanner	Carson Montgomery	February 23, 2019	128	0.54
29	29	"Skunked"	Monica Ray	Kiana Khansmith & Caldwell Tanner	Shane Houghton	March 2, 2019	129	0.52
29	29	"Axin' Saxon"	Natasha Kline	Amy Hudkins & Jonathan Wallach	Lacy Dyer & Julia Layton	March 2, 2019	129	0.52
30	30	"Cricket's Place"	Natasha Kline	Charlie Gavin & Anna O'Brian	Carson Montgomery	March 9, 2019	130	0.61
30	30	"Volunteer Tilly"	Monica Ray	Megan Boyd & Rebecca Schauer	Lacy Dyer & Julia Layton	March 9, 2019	130	0.61

=== Season 2 (2019–21) ===
The second season of Big City Greens consists of 30 episodes (58 segments) which are ordered below by their original broadcast order, and not by production number.

No. overall	No. in season	Title	Directed by	Written and storyboarded by	Story by	Original release date	Prod. code	U.S. viewers (millions)
31	1	"Cricket's Kapowie"	Natasha Kline	Amy Hudkins & Jonathan Wallach	Lacy Dyer & Julia Layton	November 16, 2019	201	0.54
31	1	"Car Trouble"	Natasha Kline	Charlie Gavin & Anna O'Brian	Lacy Dyer & Julia Layton	November 16, 2019	201	0.54
32	2	"Urban Legend"	Natasha Kline	Monica Ray & Steve Wolfhard	Carson Montgomery	November 23, 2019	202	0.57
32	2	"Wishing Well"	Monica Ray	Chris Houghton & Natasha Kline	Carson Montgomery	November 23, 2019	202	0.57
33	3	"Elevator Action"	Natasha Kline	Anna O'Brian	Kenny Byerly	November 30, 2019	204	0.58
33	3	"Bad Influencer"	Monica Ray	Kiana Khansmith & Caldwell Tanner	Kenny Byerly	November 30, 2019	204	0.58
34	4	"Green Christmas"	Monica Ray	Amy Hudkins, Kiana Khansmith, Caldwell Tanner & Jonathan Wallach	Kenny Byerly	December 7, 2019	203	0.43
35	5	"Reckoning Ball"	Natasha Kline	Anna O'Brian & Ariel Vracin-Harrell	Kenny Byerly	December 14, 2019	205	0.61
35	5	"Clubbed"	Monica Ray	Kiana Khansmith & Caldwell Tanner	Lacey Dyer & Julia Layton	December 14, 2019	205	0.61
36	6	"Impopstar"	Natasha Kline	Amy Hudkins & Jonathan Wallach	Lacey Dyer & Julia Layton	January 11, 2020	206	0.58
36	6	"Football Camp"	Monica Ray	Written by : Carson Montgomery, Raj Brueggeman & Steve Wolfhard; Storyboarded by : Raj Brueggeman & Steve Wolfhard	Carson Montgomery	January 11, 2020	206	0.58
37	7	"Heat Beaters"	Monica Ray	Raj Brueggeman & Steve Wolfhard	Carson Montegomery	January 18, 2020	207	0.57
37	7	"Bill-iever"	Natasha Kline	Charlie Gavin & Anna O'Brian	Jenava Mie	January 18, 2020	207	0.57
38	8	"Shark Objects"	Monica Ray	Kiana Khansmith & Caldwell Tanner	Kenny Byerly	January 25, 2020	208	0.55
38	8	"Dream Weaver"	Natasha Kline	Amy Hudkins & Jonathan Wallach	Lacey Dyer & Julia Layton	January 25, 2020	208	0.55
39	9	"Level Up"	Monica Ray	Raj Brueggeman & Steve Wolfhard	Kenny Byerly	February 1, 2020	209	0.59
39	9	"Wild Side"	Natasha Kline	Amy Hudkins & Jonathan Wallach	Carson Montgomery	February 1, 2020	209	0.59
40	10	"Garage Tales"	Monica Ray	Kiana Khansmith & Caldwell Tanner	Jenava Mie	February 8, 2020	210	0.44
40	10	"Animal Farm"	Natasha Kline	Natasha Kline & Anna O'Brian	Kenny Byerly & Shane Houghton	February 8, 2020	210	0.44
41	11	"Desserted"	Natasha Kline	Amy Hudkins & Jonathan Wallach	Carson Montgomery	July 11, 2020	211	0.45
41	11	"The Gifted"	Monica Ray	Raj Brueggeman & Steve Wolfhard	Jenava Mie	July 11, 2020	211	0.45
42	12	"Time Crisis"	Natasha Kline	Jennifer Begeman & Ariel Vracin-Harrell	Carson Montgomery	July 18, 2020	212	0.26
42	12	"Gramma Driver"	Monica Ray	Kiana Khansmith & Caldwell Tanner	Kenny Byerly	July 18, 2020	212	0.26
43	13	"Tilly Style"	Monica Ray	Raj Brueggemann & Steve Wolfhard	Carson Montgomery	July 25, 2020	213	0.40
43	13	"I, Farmbot"	Natasha Kline	Amy Hudkins & Jonathan Wallach	Rachel McNevin	July 25, 2020	213	0.40
44	14	"Friend Con"	Monica Ray	Caldwell Tanner & Kiana Khansmith	Kenny Byerly	August 1, 2020	214	0.56
44	14	"Flimflammed"	Natasha Kline	Written by : Kenny Byerly, Carson Montgomery & Rachel McNevin; Storyboarded by : Ariel Vracin-Harrell & Eddie West	Jenava Mie	August 1, 2020	214	0.56
45	15	"Greens' Acres"	Natasha Kline	Amy Hudkins & Jonathan Wallach	Kenny Byerly	August 8, 2020	215	0.39
45	15	"Dolled Up"	Natasha Kline	Ariel Vracin-Harrell & Chris Pianka	Rachel McNevin	August 8, 2020	215	0.39
46	16	"Gabriella's Fella"	Monica Ray	Raj Brueggeman & Steve Wolfhard	Carson Montgomery	August 15, 2020	216	0.37
46	16	"Cheap Show"	Monica Ray	Caldwell Tanner & Kiana Khansmith	Kenny Byerly	August 15, 2020	216	0.37
47	17	"Green Mirror"	Natasha Kline	Amy Hudkins & Jonathan Wallach	Kenny Byerly	August 22, 2020	217	0.48
47	17	"Cricket's Tickets"	Monica Ray	Raj Brueggeman	Rachel McNevin	August 22, 2020	217	0.48
48	18	"Times Circle"	Monica Ray	Kiana Khansmith & Caldwell Tanner	Rachel McNevin	August 29, 2020	218	0.31
48	18	"Super Gramma!"	Natasha Kline	Ariel Vracin-Harrell & Chris Pianka	Lacey Dyer & Julia Layton	August 29, 2020	218	0.31
49	19	"Present Tense"	Natasha Kline	Amy Hudkins & Jonathan Wallach	Marieve Herington & Jeffrey Jones	September 12, 2020	219	0.38
49	19	"Hurt Bike"	Natasha Kline	Ariel Vracin-Harrell & Tyler Chen	Carson Montgomery	September 12, 2020	219	0.38
50	20	"Quiet Please"	Monica Ray	Kiana Khansmith & Caldwell Tanner	Kenny Byerly	September 19, 2020	220	0.53
50	20	"Chipwrecked"	Monica Ray	Raj Brueggeman & Steve Wolfhard	Kenny Byerly & Carson Montgomery	September 19, 2020	220	0.53
51	21	"Chipocalypse Now"	Jonathon Wallach	Caldwell Tanner, Kiana Khansmith, Faryn Pearl & Ariel Vracin-Harrell	Kenny Byerly	January 16, 2021	221	0.52
52	22	"'Rent Control"	Anna O'Brian	Raj Brueggeman, Anna O'Brian & Monica Ray	Kenny Byerly	January 23, 2021	222	0.28
52	22	"Pool's Gold"	Anna O'Brian	Amy Hudkins & Steve Wolfhard	Rachel McNevin	January 23, 2021	222	0.28
53	23	"Big Resolution"	Anna O'Brian	Raj Brueggemann & Kristen Gish	Rachel McNevin	January 30, 2021	223	0.43
53	23	"Winter Greens"	Anna O'Brian	Amy Hudkins & Steve Wolfhard	Carson Montgomery	January 30, 2021	223	0.43
54	24	"Mages & Mazes"	Jonathon Wallach	Caldwell Tanner & Kiana Khansmith	Amy Hudkins	February 6, 2021	224	0.38
54	24	"Okay Karaoke"	Jonathon Wallach	Faryn Pearl & Ariel Vracin-Harrell	Rachel McNevin	February 6, 2021	224	0.38
55	25	"Date Night"	Anna O'Brian	Raj Brueggemann & Kristen Gish	Carson Montgomery	February 13, 2021	225	0.35
55	25	"The Room"	Anna O'Brian	Amy Hudkins & Steve Wolfhard	Kenny Byerly	February 13, 2021	225	0.35
56	26	"Bleeped"	Jonathon Wallach	Caldwell Tanner & Kiana Khansmith	Carson Montgomery	March 6, 2021	226	0.41
56	26	"Sellouts"	Anna O'Brian	Amy Hudkins & Steve Wolfhard	Kenny Byerly	March 6, 2021	226	0.41
57	27	"Fast Foodie"	Jonathon Wallach	Ariel Vracin-Harrell & Faryn Pearl	Zeno Robinson	March 13, 2021	227	0.40
57	27	"Spaghetti Theory"	Jonathon Wallach	Ariel Vracin-Harrell & Faryn Pearl	Rachel McNevin	March 13, 2021	227	0.40
58	28	"Ding Dongers"	Kiana Khansmith	Amy Hudkins & Steve Wolfhard	Rachel McNevin	March 20, 2021	228	0.40
58	28	"Animation Abomination"	Anna O'Brian	Raj Brueggemann & Kristen Gish	Kenny Byerly	March 20, 2021	228	0.40
59	29	"The Van"	Jonathon Wallach	Caldwell Tanner & Kiana Khansmith	Carson Montgomery	March 27, 2021	229	0.51
59	29	"Bat Girl"	Anna O'Brian	Caldwell Tanner & Kiana Khansmith	Carson Montgomery	March 27, 2021	229	0.51
60	30	"Cousin Jilly"	Anna O'Brian	Raj Brueggemann & Kristen Gish	Rachel McNevin & Carson Montgomery	April 3, 2021	230	0.31
60	30	"Gloria's Café"	Jonathon Wallach	Ariel Vracin-Harrell & Faryn Pearl	Kenny Byerly	April 3, 2021	230	0.31

=== Season 3 (2021–23) ===
The third season of Big City Greens consists of 20 episodes (36 segments) which are ordered below by their original broadcast order, and not by production number.

No. overall	No. in season	Title	Directed by	Written and storyboarded by	Story by	Original release date	Prod. code	U.S. viewers (millions)
61	1	"Squashed!"	Anna O'Brian	Written by : Rachel McNevin, Ariel Vracin-Harrell, Destiny Wood, Raj Brueggeman & Kiana Khansmith; Storyboarded by : Ariel Vracin-Harrell, Destiny Wood, Raj Brueggeman & Kiana Khansmith	Rachel McNevin	October 9, 2021	301	0.39
62	2	"Boss Life"	Jonathon Wallach	Written by : Kenny Byerly, Kiana Khansmith & Eric Brown; Storyboarded by : Kiana Khansmith & Eric Brown	Kenny Byerly	February 12, 2022	302	0.29
62	2	"Papaganda"	Jonathon Wallach	Written by : Carson Montgomery, Ariel Vracin-Harrell & Destiny Wood; Storyboarded by : Ariel Vracin-Harrell & Destiny Wood	Carson Montgomery	February 12, 2022	302	0.29
63	3	"Little Buddy"	Anna O'Brian	Written by : Carson Montgomery, Raj Brueggemann & Jen Begeman; Storyboarded by : Jen Begeman & Raj Brueggemann	Carson Montgomery	February 19, 2022	303	0.41
63	3	"Zen Garden"	Jonathon Wallach	Written by : Laura Eichhorn, Kiana Khansmith & Eric Brown; Storyboarded by : Kiana Khansmith & Eric Brown	Laura Eichhorn	February 19, 2022	303	0.41
64	4	"No Service"	Anna O'Brian	Written by : Eric Lapidus, Ariel Vracin-Harrell & Destiny Wood; Storyboarded by : Ariel Vracin-Harrell & Destiny Wood	Eric Lapidus	February 26, 2022	304	0.38
64	4	"Takened"	Jonathon Wallach	Written by : Laura Eichhorn, Drew Green & Bernice Sioson; Storyboarded by : Drew Green & Bernice Sioson	Laura Eichhorn	February 26, 2022	304	0.38
65	5	"Green Greens"	Anna O'Brian	Written by : Kenny Byerly, Raj Brueggemann & Jen Begeman; Storyboarded by : Raj Brueggemann & Jen Begeman	Kenny Byerly	March 5, 2022	305	0.35
65	5	"Truce Bomb"	Jonathon Wallach	Written by : Laura Eichhorn, Drew Green & Bernice Sioson; Storyboarded by : Drew Green & Bernice Sioson	Laura Eichhorn	March 5, 2022	305	0.35
66	6	"Trivia Night"	Jonathon Wallach	Written by : Carson Montgomery, Kiana Khansmith & Eric Brown; Storyboarded by : Kiana Khansmith & Eric Brown	Carson Montgomery	March 12, 2022	306	0.36
66	6	"Big Trouble"	Anna O'Brian	Written by : Rachel McNevin, Ariel Vracin-Harrell & Nick Sumida; Storyboarded by : Ariel Vracin-Harrell & Nick Sumida	Rachel McNevin	March 12, 2022	306	0.36
67	7	"DependaBill"	Anna O'Brian	Written by : Nate Federman, Raj Brueggemann & Jen Begeman; Storyboarded by : Raj Brueggemann & Jen Begeman	Nate Federman	July 16, 2022	307	0.26
67	7	"The Delivernator"	Jonathon Wallach	Written by : Nate Federman, Drew Green & Bernice Sioson; Storyboarded by : Drew Green & Bernice Sioson	Nate Federman	July 16, 2022	307	0.26
68	8	"Listen Up!"	Jonathon Wallach	Written by : =Carson Montgomery, Kiana Khansmith & Eric Brown; Storyboarded by : Kiana Khansmith & Eric Brown	Carson Montgomery	July 23, 2022	308	0.22
68	8	"Big Picture"	Jonathon Wallach	Written by : Rachel McNevin, Drew Green & Bernice Sioson; Storyboarded by : Drew Green & Bernice Sioson	Rachel McNevin	July 23, 2022	308	0.22
69	9	"Rembo"	Anna O'Brian	Written by : Laura Eichhorn, Ariel Vracin-Harrell & Nick Sumida; Storyboarded by : Ariel Vracin-Harrell & Nick Sumida	Laura Eichhorn	July 30, 2022 (Note: This episode first premiered on Disney+ in the United States on July 27, 2022, ahead of its official air date.)	309	0.18
69	9	"Dirt Jar"	Anna O'Brian	Written by : Kenny Byerly, Raj Brueggemann & Jen Begeman; Storyboarded by : Raj Brueggemann & Jen Begeman	Kenny Byerly	July 30, 2022	309	0.18
70	10	"The Move"	Jonathon Wallach	Written by : Carson Montgomery, Kiana Khansmith, Eric Brown, Raj Brueggemann & Jen Begeman; Storyboarded by : Kiana Khansmith, Eric Brown, Raj Brueggemann & Jen Begeman	Carson Montgomery	September 24, 2022	310	0.29
71	11	"Country Side"	Jonathon Wallach	Written by : Nate Federman, Eric Brown & Kiana Khansmith; Storyboarded by : Eric Brown & Kiana Khansmith	Nate Federman	October 1, 2022	311	0.24
71	11	"Junk Mountain"	Anna O'Brian & Kiana Khansmith	Written by : Rachel McNevin, Raj Brueggemann & Jen Begeman; Storyboarded by : Raj Brueggemann & Jen Begeman	Rachel McNevin	October 1, 2022	311	0.24
72	12	"Farmer Remy"	Anna O'Brian & Kiana Khansmith	Written by : Mary Bronaugh, Ariel Vracin-Harrell & Nick Sumida; Storyboarded by : Ariel Vracin-Harrell & Nick Sumida	Mary Bronaugh	October 8, 2022	312	0.21
72	12	"Homeward Hound"	Anna O'Brian & Kiana Khansmith	Written by : Laura Eichhorn, Drew Green & Bernice Sioson; Storyboarded by : Drew Green & Bernice Sioson	Laura Eichhorn	October 8, 2022	312	0.21
73	13	"Pie Hard"	Anna O'Brian & Kiana Khansmith	Written by : Nate Federman, Ariel Vracin-Harrell & Nick Sumida; Storyboarded by : Ariel Vracin-Harrell & Nick Sumida	Nate Federman	October 15, 2022 (Note: This episode first premiered on Disney+ in the United States on October 12, 2022, ahead of its official air date.)	313	0.24
73	13	"Rat Tail"	Nick Sumida	Written by : Raj Brueggemann, Caldwell Tanner & Bernice Sioson; Storyboarded by : Caldwell Tanner & Bernice Sioson	Raj Brueggemann	October 15, 2022	313	0.24
74	14	"Frilly Tilly"	Kiana Khansmith	Written by : Laura Eichhorn, Raj Brueggemann & Jen Begeman; Storyboarded by : Raj Brueggemann & Jen Begeman	Laura Eichhorn	October 22, 2022	314	0.26
74	14	"Montaged"	Jonathon Wallach & Nick Sumida	Written by : Nate Federman, Eric Brown & Gabi Rodea; Storyboarded by : Eric Brown & Gabi Rodea	Nate Federman	October 22, 2022	314	0.26
75	15	"Pizza Deliverance"	Kiana Khansmith	Written by : Carson Montgomery, Ariel Vracin-Harrell & Eddie West; Storyboarded by : Ariel Vracin-Harrell & Eddie West	Carson Montgomery	October 29, 2022	315	0.25
75	15	"Horse Girl"	Nick Sumida	Written by : Rachel McNevin, Cassie Zwart & Bernice Sioson; Storyboarded by : Cassie Zwart & Bernice Sioson	Rachel McNevin	October 29, 2022	315	0.25
76	16	"Virtually Christmas"	Anna O'Brian; Mark Droste (3D animation director)	Written by : Nate Federman, Laura Eichhorn, Caldwell Tanner & Eddie West; Storyboarded by : Caldwell Tanner & Eddie West	Nate Federman & Laura Eichhorn	December 3, 2022	320	0.26
77	17	"Pen Pals"	Kiana Khansmith	Written by : Nate Federman, Raj Brueggemann & Jen Begeman; Storyboarded by : Raj Brueggemann & Jen Begeman	Nate Federman	March 4, 2023	316	0.20
77	17	"Study Abroad"	Nick Sumida	Written by : Mary Bronaugh, Cassie Zwart & Bernice Sioson; Storyboarded by : Cassie Zwart & Bernice Sioson	Mary Bronaugh	March 4, 2023	316	0.20
78	18	"Honey Heist"	Nick Sumida	Written by : Laura Eichhorn, Eric Brown & Gabi Rodea; Storyboarded by : Eric Brown & Gabi Rodea	Laura Eichhorn	March 11, 2023	317	0.24
78	18	"Dog Mayor"	Nick Sumida	Written by : Carson Montgomery, Cassie Zwart & Bernice Sioson; Storyboarded by : Cassie Zwart & Bernice Sioson	Carson Montgomery	March 11, 2023	317	0.24
79	19	"Chill Bill"	Kiana Khansmith	Written by : Mary Bronaugh, Ariel Vracin-Harrell & Eddie West; Storyboarded by : Ariel Vracin-Harrell & Eddie West	Mary Bronaugh	March 18, 2023	318	0.18
79	19	"Bunny Farm"	Nick Sumida	Written by : Kenny Byerly, Eric Brown & Gabi Rodea; Storyboarded by : Eric Brown & Gabi Rodea	Kenny Byerly	March 18, 2023	318	0.18
80	20	"Long Goodbye"	Kiana Khansmith	Written by : Rachel McNevin, Raj Brueggemann, Jen Begeman, Ariel Vracin-Harrell & Eddie West; Storyboarded by : Rachel McNevin, Raj Brueggemann, Jen Begeman, Ariel Vracin-Harrell & Eddie West	Rachel McNevin	March 25, 2023	319	0.17

=== Season 4 (2023–25) ===
The fourth season of Big City Greens consists of 30 episodes, and 20 of which are ordered below by their original broadcast order, and not by production number.

No. overall	No. in season	Title	Directed by	Written and storyboarded by	Story by	Original release date	Prod. code	U.S. viewers (millions)
81	1	"Truck Stopped"	Nick Sumida	Written by : Carson Montgomery, Raj Brueggemann & Sam King; Storyboarded by : Raj Brueggemann & Sam King	Carson Montgomery	September 23, 2023	401	0.15
81	1	"Jingled"	Nick Sumida	Written by : Laura Eichhorn, Gabi Rodea & Carl Edward Mongan; Storyboarded by : Gabi Rodea & Carl Edward Mongan	Laura Eichhorn	September 23, 2023	401	0.15
82	2	"Stand-Up Bill"	Kiana Khansmith	Written by : Nate Federman, Eric Brown & Stevie Borbolla; Storyboarded by : Eric Brown & Stevie Borbolla	Nate Federman	September 30, 2023	402	0.18
82	2	"Green Trial"	Kiana Khansmith	Written by : Mary Bronaugh, Jen Begeman & Amber Vucinich; Storyboarded by : Jen Begeman & Amber Vucinich	Mary Bronaugh	September 30, 2023	402	0.18
83	3	"Bad Dad"	Nick Sumida	Written by : Nate Federman, Gabi Rodea & Carl Edward Mongan; Storyboarded by : Gabi Rodea & Carl Edward Mongan	Nate Federman	October 7, 2023	403	0.22
83	3	"Junk Junkie"	Nick Sumida	Written by : Laura Eichhorn, Raj Brueggemann & Sam King; Storyboarded by : Raj Brueggemann & Sam King	Laura Eichhorn	October 7, 2023	403	0.22
84	4	"Handshaken"	Kiana Khansmith	Written by : Carson Montgomery, Eric Brown & Stevie Borbolla; Storyboarded by : Eric Brown & Stevie Borbolla	Carson Montgomery	October 14, 2023	404	0.15
84	4	"Coffee Mates"	Nick Sumida	Written by : Mary Bronaugh, Gabi Rodea & Carl Edward Mongan; Storyboarded by : Gabi Rodea & Carl Edward Mongan	Mary Bronaugh	October 14, 2023	404	0.15
85	5	"Iced"	Kiana Khansmith	Written by : Laura Eichhorn, Jen Begeman & Lydia Estepp; Storyboarded by : Jen Begeman & Lydia Estepp	Laura Eichhorn	October 21, 2023	405	0.23
85	5	"Chipped Off"	Nick Sumida	Written by : Julia Layton & Lacey Dyer, Raj Brueggemann & Sam King; Storyboarded by : Raj Brueggemann & Sam King	Julia Layton & Lacey Dyer	October 21, 2023	405	0.23
86	6	"Internetted"	Kiana Khansmith	Written by : Nate Federman, Eric Brown & Stevie Borbolla; Storyboarded by : Eric Brown & Stevie Borbolla	Nate Federman	April 6, 2024	406	0.12
86	6	"Guiding Gregly"	Nick Sumida	Written by : Nate Federman, Gabi Rodea & Carl Edward Mongan; Storyboarded by : Gabi Rodea & Carl Edward Mongan	Nate Federman	April 6, 2024	406	0.12
87	7	"Family Tree"	Kiana Khansmith	Written by : Nate Federman, Jen Begeman & Lydia Estepp; Storyboarded by : Jen Begeman & Lydia Estepp	Nate Federman	April 13, 2024	407	0.26
87	7	"Unguarded"	Kiana Khansmith	Written by : Laura Eichhorn, Eric Brown & Stevie Borbolla; Storyboarded by : Eric Brown & Stevie Borbolla	Laura Eichhorn	April 13, 2024	407	0.26
88	8	"Concrete Jungle"	Nick Sumida	Written by : Carson Montgomery, Raj Brueggemann & Sam King; Storyboarded by : Raj Brueggemann & Sam King	Carson Montgomery	April 20, 2024	408	0.15
88	8	"Starter Pack"	Nick Sumida	Written by : Carson Montgomery, Gabi Rodea & Carl Edward Mongan; Storyboarded by : Gabi Rodea & Carl Edward Mongan	Carson Montgomery	April 20, 2024	408	0.15
89	9	"Dollar Sense"	Raj Brueggemann	Written by : Carson Montgomery, Jen Begeman & Lydia Estepp; Storyboarded by : Jen Begeman & Lydia Estepp	Carson Montgomery	April 27, 2024	409	0.18
89	9	"True Cawing"	Kiana Khansmith	Written by : Vanita Borwankar, Jen Begeman & Lydia Estepp; Storyboarded by : Jen Begeman & Lydia Estepp	Vanita Borwankar	April 27, 2024	409	0.18
90	10	"Fortune Feller"	Kiana Khansmith	Written by : Carson Montgomery, Stevie Borbolla, & Eric Brown; Storyboarded by : Stevie Borbolla & Eric Brown	Carson Montgomery	October 5, 2024	TBA	0.11
90	10	"No Escape"	Kiana Khansmith	Written by : Lacey Dyer, Julia Layton, Stevie Borbolla, & Eric Brown; Storyboarded by : Stevie Borbolla & Eric Brown	Lacey Dyer & Julia Layton	October 5, 2024	TBA	0.11
91	11	"Turkey Trouble"	Nick Sumida	Written by : Laura Eichhorn, Raj Brueggemann, & Sam King; Storyboarded by : Raj Brueggemann & Sam King	Laura Eichhorn	November 16, 2024	411	0.08
91	11	"Hard Bargain"	Nick Sumida	Written by : Nate Federman, Gabi Rodea, & Carl Edward Mongan; Storyboarded by : Gabi Rodea & Carl Edward Mongan	Nate Federman	November 16, 2024	411	0.08
92	12	"Dream Tree"	Nick Sumida	Written by : Nate Federman, Carl Edward Mongan, & Gabi Rodea; Storyboarded by : Carl Edward Mongan & Gabi Rodea	Nate Federman	December 7, 2024	412	0.13
92	12	"Blue Greens"	Kiana Khansmith	Written by : Lacy Dyer, Julia Layton, Jen Begeman, & Lydia Estepp; Storyboarded by : Jen Begeman & Lydia Estepp	Lacy Dyer & Julia Layton	December 7, 2024	412	0.13
93	13	"Hullabaloo'd"	Kiana Khansmith	Written by : Laura Eichhorn, Eric Brown, & Stevie Borbolla; Storyboarded by : Eric Brown & Stevie Borbolla	Laura Eichhorn	March 15, 2025 (Note: This episode first premiered on Disney+ in Spain on February 5, 2025, ahead of its official air date.)	414	N/A
93	13	"Jaded"	Nick Sumida	Written by : Laura Eichhorn, Raj Brueggemann, & Sam Spina; Storyboarded by : Raj Brueggemann & Sam Spina	Laura Eichhorn	March 15, 2025	414	N/A
94	14	"Dog Proof"	Kiana Khansmith	Written by : Vanita Borwankar, Jen Begeman & Lydia Estepp; Storyboarded by : Jen Begeman & Lydia Estepp	Vanita Borwankar	March 22, 2025	413	N/A
94	14	"Cricket Control"	Nick Sumida	Written by : Laura Eichhorn, Raj Brueggemann, & Sam Spina; Storyboarded by : Raj Brueggemann & Sam Spina	Laura Eichhorn	March 22, 2025	413	N/A
95	15	"April Fool"	Nick Sumida	Written by : Nate Federman, Gabi Rodea & Carl Edward Mongan; Storyboarded by : Gabi Rodea & Carl Edward Mongan	Nate Federman	March 29, 2025	415	N/A
95	15	"Good Grief"	Kiana Khansmith	Written by : Phillip Walker, Eric Brown, & Stevie Borbolla; Storyboarded by : Eric Brown & Stevie Borbolla	Phillip Walker	March 29, 2025	415	N/A
96	16	"Evil Family"	Nick Sumida	Written by : Nate Federman, Raj Brueggemann, & Sam Spina; Storyboarded by : Raj Brueggemann & Sam Spina	Nate Federman	April 5, 2025	416	N/A
96	16	"Greens Underground"	Nick Sumida	Written by : Laura Eichhorn, Gabi Rodea & Carl Edward Mongan; Storyboarded by : Gabi Rodea & Carl Edward Mongan	Laura Eichhorn	April 5, 2025	416	N/A
97	17	"Freebie Frenzy"	Kiana Khansmith	Written by : Laura Eichhorn, Jen Begeman & Lydia Estepp; Storyboarded by : Jen Begeman & Lydia Estepp	Laura Eichhorn	April 12, 2025	417	N/A
97	17	"TP'd"	Kiana Khansmith	Written by : Carson Montgomery, Jen Begeman & Lydia Estepp; Storyboarded by : Jen Begeman & Lydia Estepp	Carson Montgomery	April 12, 2025	417	N/A
98	18	"Chocolate Santa"	Kiana Khansmith	Written by : Mike Trapp, Jen Begeman & Lydia Estepp; Storyboarded by : Jen Begeman & Lydia Estepp	Mike Trapp	April 19, 2025 (Note: This episode first premiered on Disney+ in the United States on April 16, 2025, ahead of its official air date.)	418	N/A
98	18	"Meadow Mania"	Nick Sumida	Written by : Laura Eichhorn, Raj Brueggemann, & Sam Spina; Storyboarded by : Raj Brueggemann & Sam Spina	Laura Eichhorn	April 19, 2025	418	N/A
99	19	"Split Decision"	Kiana Khansmith	Written by : Carson Montgomery, Eric Brown, & Stevie Borbolla; Storyboarded by : Eric Brown & Stevie Borbolla	Carson Montgomery	April 26, 2025	419	N/A
99	19	"Skipped Over"	Kiana Khansmith	Written by : John D'Arco, Eric Brown, & Stevie Borbolla; Storyboarded by : Eric Brown & Stevie Borbolla	John D'Arco	April 26, 2025	419	N/A
100	20	"One Hundred"	Nick Sumida	Written by : Shane Houghton, Gabi Rodea, Carl Edward Mongan, Raj Brueggemann, & Sam Spina; Storyboarded by : Gabi Rodea, Carl Edward Mongan, Raj Brueggemann & Sam Spina	Shane Houghton	May 3, 2025	420	N/A
101	21	"Chip's Revenge"	Kiana Khansmith	Written by : Carson Montgomery, Nate Federman, Jen Begeman, Lydia Estepp, Eric Brown & Stevie Borbolla; Storyboarded by : Jen Begeman, Lydia Estepp, Eric Brown & Stevie Borbolla	Carson Montgomery & Nate Federman	June 7, 2025	421	N/A
102	22	"Charity Case"	Nick Sumida	Written by : Laura Eichhorn, Raj Brueggemann, & Ariel Vracin-Harrell; Storyboarded by : Raj Brueggemann & Ariel Vracin-Harrell	Laura Eichhorn	June 14, 2025	422	N/A
102	22	"Like Father"	Nick Sumida	Written by : Carson Montgomery, Gabi Rodea, & Carl Edward Mongan; Storyboarded by : Gabi Rodea & Carl Edward Mongan	Carson Montgomery	June 14, 2025	422	N/A
103	23	"Locked In"	Nick Sumida	Written by : John D'Arco, Gabi Rodea, & Carl Edward Mongan; Storyboarded by : Gabi Rodea & Carl Edward Mongan	John D'Arco	June 21, 2025	423	N/A
103	23	"City Wayne"	Kiana Khansmith	Written by : Nate Federman, Eric Brown & Stevie Borbolla; Storyboarded by : Eric Brown & Stevie Borbolla	Nate Federman	June 21, 2025	423	N/A
104	24	"Saxon Saxability"	Nick Sumida	Written by : Mike Trapp, Raj Brueggemann, & Ariel Vracin-Harrell; Storyboarded by : Raj Brueggemann & Ariel Vracin-Harrell	Mike Trapp	June 28, 2025	424	N/A
104	24	"Remy Dilemmy"	Kiana Khansmith	Written by : Laura Eichhorn, Jen Begeman, & Lydia Estepp; Storyboarded by : Jen Begeman & Lydia Estepp	Laura Eichhorn	June 28, 2025	424	N/A
105	25	"Swashbuckled"	Nick Sumida	Written by : Carson Montgomery, Gabi Rodea & Carl Edward Mongan; Storyboarded by : Gabi Rodea, Carl Edward Mongan, & Amber Vucinich	Carson Montgomery	July 5, 2025	425	N/A
105	25	"Nick Scouts"	Kiana Khansmith	Written by : Mike Trapp, Eric Brown & Stevie Borbolla; Storyboarded by : Eric Brown & Stevie Borbolla	Mike Trapp	July 5, 2025	425	N/A
106	26	"Flexed"	Nick Sumida	Written by : Laura Eichhorn, Raj Brueggemann, & Ariel Vracin-Harrell; Storyboarded by : Raj Brueggemann & Ariel Vracin-Harrell	Laura Eichhorn	July 12, 2025	426	N/A
106	26	"After Dark"	Kiana Khansmith	Written by : Nate Federman, Jen Begeman & Lydia Estepp; Storyboarded by : Jen Begeman & Lydia Estepp	Nate Federman	July 12, 2025	426	N/A
107	27	"Spinned Off"	Nick Sumida	Written by : Mike Trapp, Gabi Rodea & Carl Edward Mongan; Storyboarded by : Gabi Rodea, Carl Edward Mongan	Mike Trapp	July 19, 2025	427	N/A
107	27	"Broken Karted"	Kiana Khansmith	Written by : Kenny Byerly, Eric Brown & Stevie Borbolla; Storyboarded by : Eric Brown & Stevie Borbolla	Kenny Byerly	July 19, 2025	427	N/A
108	28	"Short Wait"	Kiana Khansmith	Written by : Mike Trapp, Eric Brown & Stevie Borbolla; Storyboarded by : Eric Brown & Stevie Borbolla	Mike Trapp	July 26, 2025	428	N/A
108	28	"Awful Lawful"	Kiana Khansmith	Written by : Carson Montgomery, Jen Begeman & Lydia Estepp; Storyboarded by : Jen Begeman & Lydia Estepp	Carson Montgomery	July 26, 2025	428	N/A
109	29	"Scooped!"	Kiana Khansmith	Written by : Kenny Byerly, Jen Begeman & Lydia Estepp; Storyboarded by : Jen Begeman & Lydia Estepp	Kenny Byerly	August 2, 2025 (Note: This episode first premiered on Disney+ in the United States on July 30, 2025, ahead of its official air date.)	429	N/A
109	29	"Mulligan'd"	Nick Sumida	Written by : Laura Eichhorn, Gabi Rodea, & Carl Edward Mongan; Storyboarded by : Gabi Rodea & Carl Edward Mongan	Laura Eichhorn	August 2, 2025	429	N/A
110	30	"Rehashed History (Note: This is a reworking of a scrapped season 1 episode titled "Hands-On History", retaining much of the original storyboards and voice recordings with a framing device added to it.)"	Nick Sumida & Monica Ray	Written by : Carson Montgomery, Cheyenne Curtis, Caldwell Tanner, Raj Brueggemann & Ariel Vracin-Harrell; Storyboarded by : Cheyenne Curtis, Caldwell Tanner, Raj Brueggemann & Ariel Vracin-Harrell	Carson Montgomery	August 9, 2025	430	N/A
110	30	"Unplanned"	Nick Sumida	Written by : Shane Houghton, Laura Eichhorn, Raj Brueggemann, & Ariel Vracin-Harrell; Storyboarded by : Raj Brueggemann & Ariel Vracin-Harrell	Shane Houghton & Laura Eichorn	August 9, 2025	430	N/A

=== Season 5 (2026–) ===
The fifth season of Big City Greens consists of 30 episodes.

No. overall	No. in season	Title	Directed by	Written and storyboarded by	Story by	Original release date	Prod. code	U.S. viewers (millions)
111	1	"Gloria Green"	Raj Brueggemann	Written by : Kenny Byerly, Kiana Khansmith, & Eric Brown; Storyboarded by : Kiana Khansmith & Eric Brown	Kenny Byerly	August 21, 2026	501	TBA
111	1	"Daddy Ditty"	Raj Brueggemann	Written by : Carson Montgomery, Jen Begeman, & Ron Stanage; Storyboarded by : Jen Begeman & Ron Stanage	Carson Montgomery	August 21, 2026	501	TBA
112	2	"Fitness Test"	Raj Brueggemann	Written by : Laura Eichhorn, Kiana Khansmith, & Eric Brown; Storyboarded by : Kiana Khansmith & Eric Brown	Laura Eichhorn	August 21, 2026	502	TBA
112	2	"The Farmies"	Nick Sumida	Written by : Nate Federman, Ariel Vracin-Harrell, Madeleine Flores, & Natasha Kline; Storyboarded by : Ariel Vracin-Harrell, Madeleine Flores, & Natasha Kline	Nate Federman	August 21, 2026	502	TBA
113	3	"Metal Heads"	Raj Brueggemann	Written by : Laura Eichhorn, Jen Begeman & Ron Stanage; Storyboarded by : Jen Begeman & Ron Stanage	Laura Eichhorn	August 21, 2026	503	TBA
113	3	"Potted Meat"	Nick Sumida	Written by : Carson Montgomery, Gabi Rodea & Carl Edward Mongan; Storyboarded by : Gabi Rodea & Carl Edward Mongan	Carson Montgomery	August 21, 2026	503	TBA
114	4	"Caging Cricket"	Raj Brueggemann	Written by : Nate Federman, Jen Begeman, & Ron Stanage; Storyboarded by : Jen Begeman & Ron Stanage	Nate Federman	August 21, 2026	504	TBA
114	4	"Trainer Tilly"	Nick Sumida	Written by : Nate Federman, Gabi Rodea & Carl Edward Mongan; Storyboarded by : Gabi Rodea & Carl Edward Mongan	Nate Federman	August 21, 2026	504	TBA
115	5	"Remy Regatta"	Raj Brueggemann	Written by : Kenny Byerly, Kiana Khansmith, & Eric Brown; Storyboarded by : Kiana Khansmith & Eric Brown	Kenny Byerly	August 21, 2026	505	TBA
115	5	"Green Journalism"	Nick Sumida	Written by : Carson Montgomery, Ariel Vracin-Harrell, Gabi Rodea & Justin Nichols; Storyboarded by : Ariel Vracin-Harrell, Gabi Rodea & Justin Nichols	Carson Montgomery	August 21, 2026	505	TBA
116	6	"Killer Kludge"	Nick Sumida	Written by : Mike Trapp, Spike Morales-Westlake, Ariel Vracin-Harrell, & Madeleine Flores; Storyboarded by : Ariel Vracin-Harrell & Madeleine Flores	Shane Houghton	October 3, 2026	TBA	TBA
116	6	"Tricked"	Nick Sumida	Written by : Mike Trapp, Gabi Rodea & Carl Edward Mongan; Storyboarded by : Gabi Rodea & Carl Edward Mongan	Mike Trapp	October 3, 2026	TBA	TBA
117	7	"Wise Gals"	Nick Sumida	Written by : Mike Trapp, Ariel Vracin-Harrell, & Gabi Rodea; Storyboarded by : Ariel Vracin-Harrell & Gabi Rodea	Mike Trapp	November 7, 2026	TBA	TBA
117	7	"Big Sweater"	Nick Sumida	Written by : Nate Federman, Derek Evanick, Amy Mai, & Carl Edward Mongan; Storyboarded by : Derek Evanick, Amy Mai & Carl Edward Mongan	Nate Federman	November 7, 2026	TBA	TBA
118	8	"Perked Up"	N/A	N/A	N/A	November 14, 2026	TBA	TBA
118	8	"Chicken Coup"	N/A	N/A	N/A	November 14, 2026	TBA	TBA
119	9	"Forever Christmas"	N/A	N/A	N/A	November 28, 2026 (Note: This episode first premiered on Disney+ in the United States on November 25, 2026, ahead of its official air date.)	TBA	TBA
119	9	"Skate Expectations"	N/A	N/A	N/A	November 28, 2026	TBA	TBA

=== Film (2024) ===
Title	Directed by	Written by	Original release date	U.S. viewers (millions)
Big City Greens the Movie: Spacecation	Anna O'Brian	Lacey Dyer, Julia Layton, Mike Yank, Shane Houghton, & Chris Houghton	June 6, 2024	0.29

== Shorts ==
Disney Channel has released several shorts connected with the series on their YouTube channel. These include seven Country Kids in the City shorts, twenty-nine Random Rings shorts, seven Road Trip shorts, nine Miss Tilly's Fun Time TV Minute shorts, and several standalone shorts.

=== Country Kids in the City (2018) ===
These shorts primarily focus on Cricket and Tilly and are no longer than a minute in length.

No.	Title	Online release date	Prod. code
1	"Hog Ride"	June 4, 2018	101
2	"Tea Party"	June 25, 2018	102
3	"The Last Donut"	June 28, 2018	103
4	"Duck Sandwich"	July 9, 2018	104
5	"Secret Cat"	July 12, 2018	106
6	"Tilly's Cat"	July 23, 2018	107
7	"Bee Tree"	August 13, 2018	105

=== Random Rings (2019–25) ===
These shorts feature prank calls by Cricket, and occasionally others, which have been set to Adobe Flash animation. The series began crossing over with other Disney Channel shows.

No.	Title	Online release date	Prod. code
1	"Cricket Calls a Karate School"	August 25, 2019	101
2	"Cricket Calls a Party Store"	September 1, 2019	102
3	"Cricket Calls a Spa"	September 8, 2019	105
4	"Cricket and Tilly Call a Piano Teacher"	September 15, 2019	109
5	"Cricket Calls a Grocery Store"	September 22, 2019	103
6	"Tilly Calls a Library"	September 29, 2019	106
7	"Cricket Calls a Pawn Shop"	October 6, 2019	104
8	"Tilly Calls a Hotel"	October 13, 2019	110
9	"Cricket Calls an Aquarium"	October 20, 2019	107
10	"Cricket Calls a Pet Store" "Rat Circus - Cricket Calls a Pet Store"	October 27, 2019	108
11	"Tilly and Cricket Call Raven-Symoné!"	December 8, 2019	TBA
12	"Doofenshmirtz Calls a Restaurant" "Dr. Doofenshmirtz's Clone Fail"	May 11, 2020	201
13	"Telemarketer Calls the Greens" "Tilly and Cricket Are Super Heroes"	May 18, 2020	202
14	"Gramma Calls an Electronics Store" "Gramma's a Spy"	May 25, 2020	203
15	"Doofenshmirtz Calls a Kitten Rescue" "Dr. Doofenshmirtz's Rat Problem"	June 1, 2020	204
16	"Dr. Doofenshmirtz Calls Gramma" "Gramma vs. Perry the Platypus"	June 8, 2020	205
17	"Cricket and Tilly Call Dr. Doofenshmirtz" "Dr. Doofenshmirtz Meets Cricket and Tilly"	June 8, 2020	206
18	"Tilly Calls the Future" "Future Tilly and the Robot Rebellion"	June 22, 2020	207
19	"Baymax Helps Launchpad" (Note: Despite not featuring any Big City Greens characters, it is still technically part of the Disney Random Rings series.)	June 29, 2020	208
20	"Cricket and Tilly Call Area 51" "Cricket and Tilly Meet an Alien"	July 6, 2020	209
21	"Tilly Calls a Magician" "Tilly Calls a Wizard"	July 13, 2020	210
22	"Cricket Pranks Raven"	November 8, 2020	211
-	"Cricket Calls Santa" (Note: Not an official episode as it is a featured segment on Disney Channel Epic Holiday Showdown.) "Santa Calls Cricket"	December 4, 2020	212
23	"Tilly Tests Trevor" "Tilly Pranks Trevor"	December 15, 2020	214
24	"Cricket Pranks Chandler"	December 15, 2020	213
25	"Tilly and Cricket Call a Pizzeria"	January 24, 2021	301
26	"Launchpad Calls Cricket"	January 31, 2021	302
27	"Tilly Calls Meg Donnelly" "Tilly Calls Meg"	April 11, 2021	303
28	"Cricket Calls Zombies"	September 21, 2021	304
29	"Cricket Calls The National Hockey League" "Cricket Calls the NHL"	March 9, 2023	401
30	"Scratch Calls the Haunted Mansion"	September 25, 2023	TBA
31	"Cricket Green and Gramma Alice Call the National Hockey League!"	March 8, 2024	TBA
32	"Cricket Green Calls Malachi Barton"	July 19, 2025	TBA

=== Disney Theme Song Takeover (2019–25) ===
No.	Title	Online release date	Prod. code
1	"Gramma Theme Song Takeover"	September 23, 2019	104
Gramma takes over the Big City Greens theme song to talk about how rough her childhood was.
2	"Bill Theme Song Takeover"	February 27, 2022	108
Bill takes over the Big City Greens theme song to talk about his potential television program about vegetable farming.
3	"Meg & Milo Roast the Greens!"	August 11, 2022	204
Milo Manheim and Meg Donnelly of Zombies fame take over the Big City Greens theme song by roasting the titular family.
4	"Baby Big City Greens"	April 1, 2023	302
An April Fool's Day video claiming to be a Big City Greens spin-off depicting the characters as infants and Gramma Alice as the faceless parental figure.
5	"Vasquez Theme Song Takeover"	May 27, 2023	TBA
When Remy requests that Vasquez (Danny Trejo) take over the Big City Greens theme, everyone’s favorite bodyguard uses the power of hard rock to sing about what his very untypical day is like.
6	"Remy Theme Song Takeover"	June 15, 2024	TBA
When Remy finally gets a chance to sing his own version of the Big City Greens theme song, everyone’s favorite loveable dork shines and gives it a fresh new rap spin.
7	"Andromeda Theme Song Takeover"	November 9, 2024	TBA
Everyone’s favorite conspiracy theorist, Andromeda, surprises the Greens when she insists that there are astonishing secret messages when you play their theme song backwards.
8	"Grandpa Nick Theme Song Takeover"	March 15, 2025	TBA
When the scheming Grandpa Nick shows up with a very suss "Theme Song Takeover Logo," everyone's favorite bad influence sings his version of the Big City Greens theme song.

=== Broken Karaoke (2019–24) ===
An infrequent series that has the Green family singing parodies of existing songs.

No.	Title	Online release date	Prod. code
1	"Queen of Nice"	October 7, 2019	101
Tilly sings a parody of "Queen of Mean" from Descendants 3.
2	"Stuck at Home"	June 15, 2020	
The Greens sing a parody of "Flesh & Bone" from Zombies 2.
3	"Monster Man"	September 28, 2021	201
Tilly sings a riff on the classic Halloween song "Monster Mash".
4	"Going Back Out"	April 10, 2022	109
The Greens continue their "Flesh & Bone" parody.
5	"Sidekicks"	May 15, 2022	
Remy teams up with Polly from Amphibia to sing a parody of "Kicks" from Sneakerella. This short notably features appearances from characters from long ended shows such as Star vs. the Forces of Evil and Gargoyles.
6	"Ain't No Doubt About It"	August 9, 2022	206
Cricket, Remy and Tilly sing a parody of "Ain't No Doubt About It" from Zombies 3.
7	"Ways We Feel Anxious"	October 10, 2022	208
Gloria teams up with Candace from Phineas and Ferb, Marcy from Amphibia and Libby from The Ghost and Molly McGee to form The Stress Girlz and sing "Ways We Feel Anxious", a parody of "Ways to Be Wicked" from Descendants 2.
8	"Santa Gave My Grandson Coal for Christmas"	November 26, 2022	209
Gramma sings about how she convinced Santa to stop giving her family coal for Christmas.
9	"Tweenage Farm Kid"	June 8, 2024	210
Cricket and Tilly sing a parody of "Teenage Dirtbag" by Wheatus.

=== Big City Greens: Road Trip (2019–25) ===
==== Trip 1 (2019) ====
Tilly wins free tickets to Breakfast Land, a food-themed amusement park, and the family go on a long, aggravating road trip. While the shorts were released separately on television, they were compiled together online.

No.	Title	Online release date
1	"Introduction"	December 15, 2019
The Greens go on a road trip to Breakfast Land for fun and amusement.
2	"922 Miles Left"	December 15, 2019
Cricket and Tilly try having snacks, but make a mess while Gramma tries to talk about knitting.
3	"834 Miles Left"	December 15, 2019
Cricket suggests doing a "Thunder Run" so they can make it to Breakfast Land in under three days.
4	"612 Miles Left"	December 15, 2019
Bill tries to wash away the evidence of hitting a bug before Tilly wakes up from her nap.
5	"519 Miles Left"	December 15, 2019
The Greens stop by a fast food restaurant, but the ordering process upsets Bill.
6	"313 Miles Left"	December 15, 2019
The Greens take turns driving the truck, including Cricket.
7	"0 Miles Left"	December 15, 2019
The Greens finally reach their destination, only to realize they ended up in Breakfast World.

==== Trip 2 (2025) ====
Vasquez offers to drive Cricket, Tilly, & Remy to Croblin Con in his RV. Gloria also comes along to attend Latté Con (which coincidentally takes place right next to Croblin Con).

No.	Title	Online release date
1	"Cricket & Tilly Road Trip to Croblin Con!"	August 1, 2025
Cricket, Tilly, Remy, and Gloria set out on an epic road trip in an RV driven by Vasquez to go to Croblin Con in hopes of obtaining "The Golden Croblin" figure.
2	"Hold Your Breath"	August 8, 2025
The kids and Gloria play a game to try to hold their breath while driving through a tunnel in hopes of making a wish!
3	"Jerky's"	August 15, 2025
The kids, Gloria, and Vasquez visit a themed fast food drive-thru where having a bad attitude is the only way to get good service! Vasquez takes it a bit too serious and psychologically threatens one of the employees, though he was still able to get food in the end.
4	"Nighttime Symphony"	August 22, 2025
When the gang visit a rest stop to get some sleep for the night, the kids & Vasquez warn each other about the things they do in their sleep (talking for Cricket, snoring for Tilly, laughing for Remy, & screaming for Vasquez), this begins to worry Gloria as she believes that she won't get any sleep, but she actually gets adjusted to it & goes to sleep. But when Gloria begins to mumble softly in her sleep, it surprisingly disturbs Vasquez & the kids from their sleep & all scold Gloria for it, much to her annoyance.
5	"The Golden Croblin"	August 29, 2025
The gang finally makes it to Croblin & Latté Con, but they find out that both conventions actually take place in the same building. The place is swarmed with Coffee-crazed Croblin fans who attack the RV when they notice the coffee cup on top of it. Vasquez refuses to leave the convention until he obtains "The Golden Croblin" figure for Remy, so the bodyguard fights his way through the pack of the Zombie-like Croblin fans & returns with the figure for Remy. When they believe they're all safe, a Croblin fan is revealed to have gotten into RV and is clinging onto the ceiling, much to the horror of Gloria & the kids.

=== Miss Tilly's Fun Time TV Minute (2020) ===
Based on the episode "Dream Weaver", Tilly hosts her talk show by interviewing Disney Channel stars. As stated in the Ariel Martin episode and in between commercials promoting Big City Greens "back-to-back" weeknights for the month of May, these take place within Tilly's dreams and are considered "not canon" with the rest of the series.

No.	Title	Online release date	Prod. code
1	"Meg Donnelly"	May 4, 2020	102
Tilly interviews Meg Donnelly from the DCOM Zombies, and its sequel Zombies 2.
2	"Trevor Tordjman"	May 4, 2020	101
Tilly interviews Zombies/Zombies 2 star and Fam Jam co-host, Trevor Tordjman.
3	"Ariel Martin"	May 4, 2020	103
Tilly interviews social media star Ariel Martin, who also appeared in Zombies 2 and co-hosts Disney Fam Jam.
4	"Siena Agudong"	May 11, 2020	104
Tilly interviews Siena Agudong, star of the at-the-time upcoming Upside-Down Magic.
5	"Shelby Simmons"	May 12, 2020	105
Tilly interviews Shelby Simmons, star of the series Bunk'd.
6	"The Houghton Brothers"	May 13, 2020	106
Tilly interviews Chris and Shane Houghton, the creators of Big City Greens, with Tilly thinking that Chris sounds familiar and that their jobs are unusual.
7	"Israel Johnson"	May 18, 2020	107
Tilly interviews Israel Johnson, star of the series Bunk'd.
8	"Izabela Rose"	May 19, 2020	108
Tilly interviews Izabela Rose, star of the at-the-time upcoming Upside-Down Magic, by way via satellite on set.
9	"Max the Goat"	May 19, 2020	109
Tilly interviews Max the Goat, star of the at-the-time upcoming Upside-Down Magic, by way via satellite on set.

=== Chibi Tiny Tales (2020–23) ===
Disney began releasing new shorts in the Chibi Tiny Tales series, itself loosely based on the Big Chibi 6 The Shorts series. The first one premiered at the end of the special Big City Greens: Shortsgiving which depicted the Greens hosting a shorts compilation show for Thanksgiving, including those from fellow shows Amphibia, The Owl House and Phineas and Ferb. A second shorts compilation special, titled Shortstober, aired on Disney Channel and was released on YouTube on October 23, 2021. A third shorts compilation special, titled Shortsmas, premiered on December 3, 2022.

No.	Title	Online release date	Prod. code
1	"Turkey Tussle"	November 16, 2020	0013
2	"Christmas Crashers"	November 29, 2020	0014
3	"Say it Ain't Snow"	December 6, 2020	0015
4	"Big City Greens Christmas Marathon"	December 19, 2021	0034
5	"Doof Falls for Gramma"	February 6, 2022	0038
6	"Breakfastland!"	March 13, 2022	0039
7	"Tower of Terror"	October 6, 2022	0050
8	"Prune Wars"	February 18, 2023	0063
9	"Tilly & Cricket Rescue Saxon"	July 22, 2023	0077
10	"Big City Greens Prank War!"	September 2, 2023	0082
11	"The Decorator-Inator"	November 22, 2025	1128

=== Lip Switch (2020) ===
No.	Title	Online release date	Prod. code
1	"ZOMBIES Lip Switch w/ Big City Greens" "Big City Greens x Zombies"	November 19, 2020	101
The cast of Big City Greens perform an abridged version of Zombies with their mouths replacing the characters' in the film.
2	"The Santa Clause Lip Switch w/ Big City Greens" "Big City Greens x The Santa Clause"	December 13, 2020	102
The cast of Big City Greens perform an abridged version of The Santa Clause with their mouths replacing the characters' in the film.

=== Line Rider (2022) ===
No.	Title	Online release date	Prod. code
1	"Big City Greens x Line Rider"	February 20, 2022	TBA
The Green Family are rendered as characters in the Line Rider game, set to an orchestral rendition of the theme song.

=== How NOT to Draw (2022–25) ===
A series of shorts where a certain character from a Disney property, mainly a Disney Channel show, would usually do certain shenanigans as they request from the animator or the artist.

No.	Title	Original release date	Prod. code
1	"Cricket Green Cartoon Comes to Life!"	September 30, 2022	TBA
When Cricket Green from Big City Greens is brought to life, he has a very special request for his animator (Kari Wahlgren).
2	"Tilly"	November 16, 2024	TBA
In this drawing tutorial parody, Tilly Green helps spark an animator's (Shane Houghton) imagination by getting him to play a game of make believe that turns a tea party into an exciting mystery!
3	"Gramma Alice Cartoon Comes to Life!"	October 11, 2025	TBA
In this drawing tutorial parody, Gramma Alice is not too pleased about being sketched by an Animator (Chris Houghton), and she is determined to do anything to get back to her family!
