= Virtually Christmas =

- Big City Greens episode
- Promotional poster for the episode
- Episode no.: Season 3 Episode 16
- Directed by: Anna O'Brian
- Written by: Rachel McNevin, Ariel Vracin-Harrell, Destiny Wood, Raj Brueggeman and Kiana Khansmith
- Production code: 320
- Original air date: December 3, 2022
- Running time: 22 minutes

Guest appearance
- Alfonso Ribiero as Mr. Extras

Episode chronology
← Previous "Horse Girl"	Next → "Pen Pals"
- Big City Greens season 3

"Virtually Christmas" is a half-hour American animated television special, serving as the sixteenth episode of the third season of Big City Greens, and the 76th episode of the series overall. The episode was originally broadcast on Disney Channel on December 3, 2022, in the United States. In this episode, when Cricket gets snowed in at Remington Manor, he attempts to recreate his family's Christmas traditions inside of a virtual reality game, but must keep the game's true nature a secret from them.

== Plot ==
Prior to the events of "The Move", (Note: This episode was originally the next episode to premiere after "Squashed!", but was delayed the following year due to the 3D sequences being unfinished at the time.) Cricket, tired of his family's same old Christmas traditions, goes to Remy's place to play the virtual reality game Outpost Infinity, which had received a Christmas update. Cricket ends up getting snowed in with Remy, but the latter reveals that he left a VR present for him at his house and Cricket suggests that they all go into Outpost Infinity to recreate the family's traditions, hiding the fact that it is a tower defense game.

They recreate Alice's house and then try to complete all of their family traditions, such as finding the fruitcake, while Remy holds off all the waves of monsters and Mr. Extras occasionally appears trying to sell add-ons. By the time they reach the last tradition and Cricket is about to top the Christmas tree with the star, Remy blasts into the house and warns them that a wave of monsters are coming, thus exposing their secret. With no option, the Greens fight off the monsters. They purchase a Christmas Cannon from Mr. Extras to use against the giant monster and end up defeating it.

Afterwards, while the rest of the Green family and Remy continued fighting off the next wave, Cricket felt like it wasn't Christmas if he didn't top the tree with his family. Therefore, he takes off the goggles and finds a way through the snow back home. After he returns, the Remington's arrive and, since they didn't have their own Christmas traditions, joined in on the Greens'.

== Voice cast ==
- Chris Houghton as Cricket Green
- Marieve Herington as Tilly Green
- Bob Joles as Bill Green
- Artemis Pebdani as Alice Green
- Wendi McLendon-Covey as Nancy Green
- Danny Trejo as Vasquez
- Zeno Robinson as Remy Remington
- Colton Dunn as Russell Remington
- Lorraine Toussaint as Rashida Remington
- Alfonso Ribeiro as Mr. Extras

== Production ==
=== Development ===
Big City Greens was renewed for a third season on January 13, 2021. "Virtually Christmas" was announced at the New York Comic Con in October 2022. The 3D animation was produced with Unreal Engine. The episode also features a different opening sequence with a remix of the main theme song. In November 2022, the episode was announced to release on December 3.

"Virtually Christmas" was directed by frequent series director Anna O'Brian, written by Rachel McNevin, Ariel Vracin-Harrell, Destiny Wood, Raj Brueggeman and Kiana Khansmith, and storyboarded by Ariel Vracin-Harrell, Destiny Wood, Raj Brueggeman and Kiana Khansmith.

=== Casting ===
The episode features the main voice cast of the series, with Alfonso Ribeiro guest starring as Mr. Extras.

== Reception ==
=== Viewership ===
"Virtually Christmas" received 260 thousand viewers on its initial premiere.

=== Critical response ===
Tony Betti of Laughing Place gave a positive review, writing, "I love when Big City Greens ventures into these kinds of special episodes, and this Christmas one has enough charm to make it a staple of holiday viewing in households everywhere, including my own." He also praised the 3D animation, writing that it is "absolutely gorgeous and it has made me want a Big City Greens video game even more than I already do." Furthermore, he later listed this episode as one of his favorites from the third season.
