= Big City Greens the Movie: Spacecation (soundtrack) =

Big City Greens the Movie: Spacecation (Original Soundtrack)

Soundtrack album by Cast – Big City Greens
- Released: June 7, 2024
- Recorded: 2024
- Studio: John Williams Music Stage, Sony Pictures Studios, Culver City, California
- Genre: Soundtrack
- Length: 22:56
- Label: Walt Disney Records
- Producer: Joachim Horsley

Big City Greens the Movie: Spacecation (Original Soundtrack) is the soundtrack album of the 2024 film of the same name. The album featured several original songs performed by the cast members, and few tracks from the original score composed and conducted by Joachim Horsley. The album was released by Walt Disney Records on June 7, 2024, the day after the film's television premiere.

== Background ==
In January 2022, it was reported that a musical film based on the Disney Channel animated series Big City Greens was in development at Disney Television Animation. Big City Greens composer Joachim Horsley was announced to return to score the film. Songs for the film were written during lockdown due to the COVID-19 pandemic. During production, series creators Chris and Shane Houghton, director Anna O'Brian, and some cast members would often record songs at Horsley's home studio. The final versions of the songs and the score were recorded at the John Williams Music Stage at Sony Pictures Studios with a full orchestra. According to Shane Houghton, the score was recorded over two days.

The opening song serves as a reintroduction to the Green family and the show's concept, which the Houghton brothers incorporated as a way to introduce the characters to new audiences. The writers also incorporated a musical number for Renée Elise Goldsberry's character Colleen Voyd after noticing a great gap between musical numbers and because they wanted to reiterate certain plot points. The crew wanted Cheri Oteri to sing a villain song in her character, Gwendolyn Zapp. They came up with a jazzy villain song, and O'Brian suggested giving her giving the character a "Bob Fosse type of choreography." A soundtrack album was released by Walt Disney Records on June 7, 2024, the day after the film's television premiere.

== Reception ==
Tony Betti of Laughing Place praised the film's songs, saying that "these numbers are nothing like we’ve ever seen on the series before. They are spectacle, they are beautiful, and they are on a much grander scale." He highlighted "Rules Rap" by Goldsberry's character Colleen Voyd as his favorite track due to his "fondness for technicalities and structure." Tessa Smith of Mama’s Geeky gave high praise to the songs as well as the cast's performances and said, "They fit into the plot points so perfectly, and as any good musical does, they propel the story forward through montages."

== Track listing ==
Big City Greens the Movie: Spacecation (Original Soundtrack)
No.	Title	Performer(s)	Length
1.	"Green Family Vacation"	Chris Houghton • Marieve Herington • Bob Joles • Artemis Pebdani • Wendi McLendon-Covey	2:39
2.	"Rules Rap"	Renée Elise Goldsberry	1:34
3.	"Space Is Fun"	Houghton • Herington • Joles • Pebdani	1:46
4.	"Gwendolyn’s Lament"	Cheri Oteri	1:53
5.	"Stuff I Said"	Houghton • Herington • Joles	2:58
6.	"Green Family Vacation (Reprise)"	Houghton • Herington • Joles • Pebdani	1:18
7.	"Big City Greens Theme Song (Movie Version)"	Joachim Horsley	0:49
8.	"Dodging Trash"	Horsley	2:31
9.	"Epic Robot Chase"	Horsley	1:55
10.	"What You Do Best"	Horsley	3:37
11.	"Today Really Turned Around"	Horsley	1:23
12.	"Remy’s Conga"	Horsley	0:33
