= Okay Karaoke =

2nd segment of the 54th episode of Big City Greens

- Big City Greens segment
- Title card
- Episode no.: Season 2 Episode 24b
- Directed by: Jonathon Wallach; Monica Ray (supervising director)
- Written by: Ariel Vracin-Harrell and Faryn Pearl
- Production code: 224b
- Original air date: February 6, 2021
- Running time: 11 minutes

Guest appearances
- Macy Gray as Kara Karaoke; Aaron Barrett as Ska Guy

Episode chronology
← Previous "Mages & Mazes"	Next → "Date Night"
- Big City Greens season 2

"Okay Karaoke" is the second segment of the 24th episode of the second season of the American animated television series Big City Greens. "Okay Karaoke" originally aired in the United States on February 6, 2021, on Disney Channel.

In the episode, the Greens and Remy Remington go out to Okay Karaoke to sing some songs, but Tilly Green struggles to decide what genre of music best expresses her.

== Plot ==
The Greens, along with Remy, go out for a night of karaoke at a place called Kara's Okay Karaoke, Tilly is impressed how everyone is here for singing. Cricket has a programmer that can choose any song type when someone named Kara Karaoke tells him picking a karaoke song is no careless task. Tilly wants to pick a song but does not have any choice, and Bill suggests that they could help her by taking turns.

Bill starts singing his song "Can't Never Give Up (My Pickup Truck)", imagining himself as a country singer that describes Bill being in love with the Kludge. He drives around the desert during the song, and even goes to an amusement park in the photos. As the song finishes, Tilly is not sure if that's her style for her, so Nancy starts singing "Back Off!".

During the song, Nancy imagines herself as a punk rebel terrorizes the street with spray paint, including turning university into madness. After her song, Tilly thinks her style is awesome, but too hard for her. Alice is furious that there are no more good classics such as music or black and white, but the rest aren't sure. Gramma starts singing "Ask My Kazoo", which resembles old black and white cartoons. Tilly doesn't like where this was going and would rather not choose it when Kara Karaoke appears and tells her not to choose in haste, time will not choose it for her. After Alice's song finishes Cricket and Remy started singing their song "Thinking is Hard." During the song Remy thinks everything is dumb but feels bad, but Cricket suggests to him, to don't think.

After their song, everyone liked it apart from Bill since he doesn't trust their song. As Tilly was going to choose, a bunch of other people begin rushing her to make a decision. This stresses her so much that she gets so afraid that she runs inside the girls' bathroom, depressed that she can't find her melody. Her family tries to talk to her, but Cricket interrupts, saying that perfect songs don't exist and Bill tries to correct Cricket, saying that what he said was a mistake.

However, Tilly finds what she needs anyway and thanks her brother with a big hug and gave him a kiss on the right cheek and she did it sweetly and Cricket felt lovestruck and he felt very good, very proud, very happy, and very brave about the good deed he did for his sister and Tilly was glad to have Cricket by her side. Finally coming onto the stage Tilly sings "Sing My Song", an original song of her own making. It shows her as a mermaid swimming with fish, with a rainbow dress, silly mirrors, and black magical colors. During her song, everyone else sings along with her including her family. As her song finishes, Kara Karaoke is impressed how she sung very well. Even though, there was no prize for them, as they left, someone else gets a turn.

== Voice cast ==
- Chris Houghton as Cricket Green, Impatient Man
- Marieve Herington as Tilly Green, Pink Woman, Purple Boy
- Bob Joles as Bill Green, Duet Men
- Artemis Pebdani as Alice Green
- Wendi McLendon-Covey as Nancy Green
- Zeno Robinson as Remy Remington
- Macy Gray as Kara Karaoke
- Aaron Barrett as Ska Guy
- Shane Houghton as Purple Dad

== Production ==
=== Development ===
Big City Greens was renewed by Disney Channel for a second season on May 17, 2018, ahead of the first season's premiere. The Houghton brothers got the idea for a Karaoke-themed episode from "Green Christmas", another musical episode from the series. The success of said episode inspired this episode. Rachel McNevin, a staff writer for the series, pitched the idea of putting the Greens in a karaoke setting.

"Okay Karaoke" was written by Ariel Vracin-Harrell and Faryn Pearl and directed by Jonathon Wallach, with Monica Ray as supervising director. Joachim Horsley wrote the music for the episode. The episode contains five songs, which were released in a soundtrack album titled Big City Greens: Don’t Think, Just Sing!, ahead of the episode's premiere.

=== Casting ===
Macy Gray guest stars in this episode as Kara Karaoke, the owner of Okay Karaoke.

== Reception ==
=== Viewership ===
"Okay Karaoke" received 430 thousand viewers on its initial premiere.

=== Critical response ===
Tony Betti of Laughing Place praises the songs, stating, "this mostly musical episode has short tunes that prove to be so catchy that Walt Disney Records released a digital soundtrack for the episode just yesterday."
