= Pretty Pretty Please I Don't Want to Be a Magical Girl =

American animated web series

- Genre: Comedy; Magical girl; Parody; Slice of life
- Created by: Kiana Khansmith
- Written by: Kiana Khansmith
- Directed by: Kiana Khansmith
- Voices of: Anairis Quiñones; Bennett Abara; Christine Marie Cabanos; Aleks Le; Shara Kirby; Michele Knotz; Marieve Herington
- Ending theme: "Her Song" by Tasha Shaik
- Composer: Yasna Vismale
- Country of origin: United States
- Original language: English
- No. of episodes: 2

Production
- Executive producer: Kiana Khansmith
- Editor: Emily Rifkin
- Running time: 10 minutes

Original release
- Network: YouTube
- Release: February 28, 2025 – present

Pretty Pretty Please I Don't Want to Be a Magical Girl is an American animated magical girl web series created by Kiana Khansmith. The first episode was released on YouTube on February 28, 2025.

== Synopsis ==
The pilot follows Aika, a self-proclaimed "normal girl of average talent", as she begins her first day of high school. While talking with her new friend Zira in the cafeteria, Aika's ordinary day is interrupted by the entrance of magical villain Eclipse. Zira's attempt to stand up to him forces Aika to reveal herself as magical girl Star Guardian: Guardian of the Stars. Though Zira is delighted by Aika's magical girl identity, Aika herself is unenthusiastic, quickly dispatching Eclipse using a magically-summoned lead pipe. Eclipse teleports away after his defeat and speaks with the woman who empowered him, Lady DeVoid, who is pleased to hear that he was able to find Aika.

== Cast ==
- Anairis Quiñones as Aika, a 15-year-old girl who comes to Earth but wants to be a normal girl and put aside her magical girl duties.
- Bennett Abara as Zira, a 16-year-old shy, nerdy girl who goes to school with Aika and becomes her friend.
- Christine Marie Cabanos as Hoshi, the star-shaped magical companion of Aika, who tries to push her to accept her role as a magical girl.
- Aleks Le as Eclipse, one of the minions of Lady DeVoid who is extremely incompetent at his job.
- Shara Kirby as Lady DeVoid, the series villain who endeavors to defeat Aika and Hoshi.
- Michele Knotz as Miss, the teacher of Aika and Zira.
- Marieve Herington as Sidney the Kidney Girl, a character whose name comes from when Hoshi passes through her.

== Episodes ==
| No. | Title | Original release date |
|---|---|---|
| 1 | "I Don't Want to Be a Magical Girl" | February 28, 2025 |
Aika, the Star Guardian, is excited to start her new, normal high school life. She befriends a new, "normal" girl named Zira, who is a self proclaimed loser. Things are going great until an old enemy from her magical girl past shows up, Eclipse, Lady DeVoid's crony.
| 2 | "I Want to be a Normal Girl" | January 31, 2026 |
Day one of school is done and Aika's ready to continue living her normal life. Hoshi, however, refuses to let Aika stay. Aika convinces Hoshi that Zira's presence will allow her to acclimate into her new life.

== Development ==
Khansmith conceptualized the series characters in August 2024 as an "experimental portfolio piece," posting them on her personal Tumblr, which attracted a "committed community" of fans, some of whom created art, or posted fan theories. On her blog, Khansmith described the series as geared toward a young adult audience, noted that she did not know the characters' sexualities, and that she was still figuring out where to go with the series. Herington also served as the series voice director, with Khansmith saying she helped bring the entire cast together, and that she learned a lot about voice acting, voice directing, and "running an indie production from her." The series theme song, entitled "Her Song", is by Tasha Shaik.

The first episode was released on February 28, 2025. In January 2026, it was announced, at the end of the second episode, that Mercury Filmworks would be releasing a fully animated version of the pilot, which ultimately was released on September 4, 2026. Consequence also reported that Nani Moco did animation on the episode as well.

In a March 2025 interview, Khansmith stated that Aika's outlook on being a magical girl is how she felt in the animation industry and working for Disney, but that her friends became an "inspiration for Zira's character" as she spent time around people who were passionate. She also emphasized the importance of having a protagonist who was Black and Japanese, with a "Black love interest," and noted the influence of Pokémon, Ojamajo Doremi, Panty and Stocking, and Astro Boy, while noting that she modeled Zira after Toko Fukawa from Danganronpa and modeled villains after those in Sailor Moon. She called the series "pretty subversive" but also wanted it to be an "earnest take" on the subgenre.

The series had a panel at the Animation Is Film in Los Angeles in October 2025, with a Q&A featuring Khansmith, Quiñones, Marie Cabanos, and series editor Emily Rifkin. The panel and Q&A, about the behind-the-scenes work of creating the pilot, followed a special screening of the series pilot.

The second episode was released on January 31, 2026.

== Reception ==
The series has been positively received. Naledi Ramphele of GameRant described the pilot as subverting the expectations of the subgenre with "a brilliant reversal of magical girl tropes, showcasing a mix of homage, parody, and sincerity", called it a "love letter" to Sailor Moon that explores the subgenre with a "unique twist", with likable characters, and perfect parody while being fresh and nostalgic at the same time. Jade King of TheGamer called the series a "huge win" for indie animation, with the pilot receiving 2 million views by March 2025, calling it "charming" and saying it has a lot of potential for character development, either with Aika or Zira. Petrana Radulovic of Polygon called the pilot a "passion project" of Khansmith, praised it as an "affectionate parody" of magical girl series and hoped it received a full series order.

Rendy Jones of Autostraddle listed the pilot in publication's list of "queer animated wins" for 2025, calling it a "clever parody of the magical girl subgenre" and was excited to have a "Black, queer, magical girl" with a romantic interest as a "dark-skinned Black girl too," stating it something "rare in queer media." Liz Shannon Miller of Consequence noted that the pilot's parody of Sailor Moon and "other shows of its genre" not only is done in a "really cute and loving way" but works as a parody because it full of "affection for the subject matter." Miller also praised the fully-animated first episode as "fantastic" and hoped that it would become "a full series."

Justin Carter of Gizmodo reviewed the first two episodes, saying the series is an "indie darling" that deserves a spotlight and one of the big "animation scene stealers" of 2025, with a fun dynamic between Zira, Hoshi, and Aika, remaining "consistently funny" and tuned for general audiences without "tipping into being too adult." Carter compared the series to Big City Greens, which Khansmith works on, noted that while the episodes only consist of storyboards, asking viewers to put in "more mental work," the boards are clean with clearly defined actions by characters, with cast performances giving the series a "certain charm," and said that the series has the potential to be "as big" as the series creator wants it to be. In another article, Carter listed the series as among indie animation on YouTube, noting that those aged 14 to 25 are watching indie animation in different ways, and cited the series as an example of "rough sketches," that 57% of those aged 14–25 watched weekly on YouTube.

Online audience reception was also positive. By December 2025, the pilot had received 4.9 million views. Justin Carter of Gizmodo noted that fans have taken a shine to the series, pointing the engagement of the series creator with fans, and said engagement explains why Mercury Filmworks agreed to "fully animate the pilot" which could be a "soft launch for a full series or...little one-and-done."
