= Big City Greens season 3 =

Big City Greens
- Season 3
- Promotional poster
- Starring: Chris Houghton; Marieve Herington; Bob Joles; Artemis Pebdani; Zeno Robinson; Wendi McLendon-Covey; Anna Akana
- No. of episodes: 20 (36 segments)

Release
- Original network: Disney Channel
- Original release: October 9, 2021 – March 25, 2023

Season chronology
- ← Previous; Season 2 Next → Season 4

The third season of the American animated television series Big City Greens, created by the Houghton Brothers (Chris and Shane Houghton), premiered on Disney Channel on October 9, 2021, and concluded on March 25, 2023.

The first half of the season focuses on the adventures of the Green family after having moved to Big City to live with Gramma Alice. The second half of the season has the Greens, sans Alice, return to their old home in Smalton, joined by Nancy and Remy. Alice joins them following "Homeward Hound".

The series features the voices of Chris Houghton, Marieve Herington, Bob Joles, Artemis Pebdani, Zeno Robinson, Wendi McLendon-Covey, and Anna Akana.

== Production ==
Big City Greens was renewed for a third season on January 13, 2021. The season was produced mostly at home, due to the fact that it was greenlit around the time of the COVID-19 pandemic. A trailer for the season was released on February 3, 2022.

== Episodes ==
The episodes are ordered by their original broadcast order, not their production order.

No. overall	No. in season	Title	Directed by	Written and storyboarded by	Story by	Original release date	Prod. code	U.S. viewers (millions)
61	1	"Squashed!"	Anna O'Brian	Written by : Rachel McNevin, Ariel Vracin-Harrell, Destiny Wood, Raj Brueggeman & Kiana Khansmith; Storyboarded by : Ariel Vracin-Harrell, Destiny Wood, Raj Brueggeman & Kiana Khansmith	Rachel McNevin	October 9, 2021	301	0.39
It is Halloween once again and the Greens and Gloria are hoping that this year's events will not be like the last. When Bill's pumpkins are not grown to perfection, Tilly takes it upon herself to try Gwendolyn Zapp's new compound which is guaranteed to make their crops grow in a short period of time. Meanwhile, Cricket tries to be a little trickster with bad results and Remy tries to qualm Vasquez around the holiday. The compound works but turns all the pumpkins into monsters that quickly eat up their friends and tries to send a signal to the rest of the Big City to turn all pumpkins into monsters. Ultimately, Tilly learns her lesson and with Cricket take out the leader pumpkin, thus destroying the signal and saving Big City from another disaster. Guest stars: Cheri Oteri as Gwendolyn Zapp, Luke Lowe as Benny, Betsy Sodaro as Community Sue, Andy Daly as Officer Keys, John Early as Alexander, Monica Ray as Kiki Kitashima, Lamar Woods as Weezie Eastman, Colton Dunn as Brett Eze
62	2	"Boss Life"	Jonathon Wallach	Written by : Kenny Byerly, Kiana Khansmith & Eric Brown; Storyboarded by : Kiana Khansmith & Eric Brown	Kenny Byerly	February 12, 2022	302	0.29
62	2	"Papaganda"	Jonathon Wallach	Written by : Carson Montgomery, Ariel Vracin-Harrell & Destiny Wood; Storyboarded by : Ariel Vracin-Harrell & Destiny Wood	Carson Montgomery	February 12, 2022	302	0.29
"Boss Life": Gloria tries to keep her perfect rating for Gloria + Green Café until Community Sue gives her a B rating for the spongey crepes. After failing again, Sue tells her that it was constructive criticism and Gloria realizes that she can do better. Meanwhile, Cricket tries to run the café, but makes no effort to train his "new hires" as things start falling apart. Realizing he made a mess, Gloria returns and sets things right. "Papaganda": Gramma, Cricket, and Tilly complain about picking blackberries. Bill picks up a "Live, Laugh, Love" mantra after a visit to Janice's Niceties and gains a cult-like mentality with it. While Cricket and Gramma rebel against the forced positivity, Tilly immediately takes to it. Cricket and Gramma try to escape, but are converted. Bill soon realizes that being positive all the time is impossible and learns that being honest is okay. Guest stars: Betsy Sodaro as Community Sue, Luke Lowe as Benny, Monica Ray as Kiki Kitashima, Jenna Ortega as Gabriella Espinosa, Lamar Woods as Weezie Eastman, Elizabeth Hanks as Angelina, Lennon Parham as Janice
63	3	"Little Buddy"	Anna O'Brian	Written by : Carson Montgomery, Raj Brueggemann & Jen Begeman; Storyboarded by : Jen Begeman & Raj Brueggemann	Carson Montgomery	February 19, 2022	303	0.41
63	3	"Zen Garden"	Jonathon Wallach	Written by : Laura Eichhorn, Kiana Khansmith & Eric Brown; Storyboarded by : Kiana Khansmith & Eric Brown	Laura Eichhorn	February 19, 2022	303	0.41
"Little Buddy": At the Community Center, Cricket and Tilly are paired up with "little buddies" to look after; Tilly gets a quiet girl named Emma while Cricket gets a rowdy boy named Chase. Tilly accidentally starts a cult with the children and escapes, while Cricket discovers that he made a connection with Chase that no other big buddy had before and decides to fulfill his promise of pulling off a stunt with him. "Zen Garden": While Bill attempts to relax at the spa with Gramma, Nancy takes over the gardening duties back at home. However, she ends up ignoring Bill's carefully laid instructions and things go awry while Gramma is forced to knock Bill out so that he can finally relax. Cricket and Tilly help Nancy finish the gardening as a very calm Bill returns and compliments Nancy on her job, only to revert to his stressed out self. Guest stars: Betsy Sodaro as Community Sue, Lamar Woods as Weezie Eastman, Monica Ray as Kiki Kitashima, Tim Robinson as Gregly, Adelynn Spoon as Emma, Caron Minniear as Chase, Karamo Brown as Kludge Sterring Wheel, Gwendoline Yeo as Female Masseuse
64	4	"No Service"	Anna O'Brian	Written by : Eric Lapidus, Ariel Vracin-Harrell & Destiny Wood; Storyboarded by : Ariel Vracin-Harrell & Destiny Wood	Eric Lapidus	February 26, 2022	304	0.38
64	4	"Takened"	Jonathon Wallach	Written by : Laura Eichhorn, Drew Green & Bernice Sioson; Storyboarded by : Drew Green & Bernice Sioson	Laura Eichhorn	February 26, 2022	304	0.38
"No Service": Cricket is not allowed inside a convenience store to get a free splishee because he refuses to wear shoes as a clerk named Clark enforces the "No Shoes, No Shirt, No Service" rule while Bill and Gramma search for a parking spot. Despite Cricket's best efforts, he is not allowed inside and borrows Tilly's shoes. He decides to stick to his principles and forfeits the splishee, which in turn gets him banned for life from the convenience store. Bill and Gramma finally find a parking spot just as Cricket and Tilly return. "Takened": While Cricket and Remy prepare for Vasquez' "bodyguard-iversary", Bill is tasked with distracting Vasquez. Cricket and Remy sneak out of the house, resulting in Vasquez becoming convinced that the boys have been kidnapped by the Order of the Fang and drags Bill along for a rescue mission. Bill overcomes his insecurity and ends up rescuing Vasquez in time to take him back to his party. Guest stars: Eugene Cordero as Clark, Ken Marino as Dirk, Colton Dunn as Russell Remington, Joe Manganiello as Viper Fang
65	5	"Green Greens"	Anna O'Brian	Written by : Kenny Byerly, Raj Brueggemann & Jen Begeman; Storyboarded by : Raj Brueggemann & Jen Begeman	Kenny Byerly	March 5, 2022	305	0.35
65	5	"Truce Bomb"	Jonathon Wallach	Written by : Laura Eichhorn, Drew Green & Bernice Sioson; Storyboarded by : Drew Green & Bernice Sioson	Laura Eichhorn	March 5, 2022	305	0.35
"Green Greens": Bill and Tilly must take a fluorescent light bulb to the e-waste center, but the journey turns out to be very rough. Meanwhile, Cricket and Gramma must toss the trash away and in the process, learn about recycling. After a series of inconveniences, Bill and Tilly get the bulb to the e-waste center, but are tired from their journey only to perk up at Cricket and Gramma's newfound love of recycling. "Truce Bomb": Tilly decides to finally resolve the feud between Gramma and Mr. Grigorian. She successfully manages to get to the root of their issues with each other and they finally call a truce. However, their zest for life is immediately drained and Tilly and Cricket resolve to kidnap their cats to get them to feud again. While they do not take the bait at first, they manage to get back to their squabbling. Guest stars: Colton Dunn as Brett Eze, Maurice LaMarche as Alucard Grigorian
66	6	"Trivia Night"	Jonathon Wallach	Written by : Carson Montgomery, Kiana Khansmith & Eric Brown; Storyboarded by : Kiana Khansmith & Eric Brown	Carson Montgomery	March 12, 2022	306	0.36
66	6	"Big Trouble"	Anna O'Brian	Written by : Rachel McNevin, Ariel Vracin-Harrell & Nick Sumida; Storyboarded by : Ariel Vracin-Harrell & Nick Sumida	Rachel McNevin	March 12, 2022	306	0.36
"Trivia Night": The Greens are at Gloria + Green Café for trivia night, but Cricket does not think that he has any smart knowledge. He digs into the recesses of his brain aided by his factoids, but believes he failed finding anything. When the café gets flooded, Cricket uses his knowledge to save everyone and manages to answer the bonus question at the end, proving that he does know things. "Big Trouble": Bill is shocked that Tilly did something bad and punishes her. In response, Tilly decides to become a rebel and recruits Andromeda. After failing to do anything bad, Tilly decides to shoplift, but feels guilty about it and returns the item she stole. Back at home, Gramma tells Tilly that everyone sometimes does bad, but they are ultimately good people in the end. Bill is relieved to see Tilly back to normal. Guest stars: Lorraine Toussaint as Rashida Remington, Colton Dunn as Russell Remington and Brett Eze, Maurice LaMarche as Alucard Grigorian, Betsy Sodaro as Community Sue, John Early as Alexander, Nicole Byer as Andromeda
67	7	"DependaBill"	Anna O'Brian	Written by : Nate Federman, Raj Brueggemann & Jen Begeman; Storyboarded by : Raj Brueggemann & Jen Begeman	Nate Federman	July 16, 2022	307	0.26
67	7	"The Delivernator"	Jonathon Wallach	Written by : Nate Federman, Drew Green & Bernice Sioson; Storyboarded by : Drew Green & Bernice Sioson	Nate Federman	July 16, 2022	307	0.26
"DependaBill": Bill meets Doug Perkins and hits it off with him, only to anger him when he accidentally destroys his roof. Bill tries to be friends with him again, via Cricket's advice, but ultimately decides to be upfront with him thanks to Nancy and the two make amends. Tilly loses a sock at the laundromat run by Mr. Fluffenfold and begins to believe a conspiracy, but later ends up finding it hidden under a dryer. "The Delivernator": Cricket's delivery duties is put to the test against Gwendolyn Zapp's latest invention, the Delivernator. Cricket puts his deliveries over the people that he has formed close bonds with and despite the Delivernator getting finished quicker, Gloria prefers Cricket's friendliness. Gramma goes to war with ants in her house, but listens to Tilly's advice and simply tricks them into leaving. Guest stars: Patton Oswalt as Mr. Fluffenfold, Tom Gamill as Doug Perkins, Colton Dunn as Brett Eze, Nicole Byer as Andromeda, Cheri Oteri as Gwendolyn Zapp, Keith Silverstein as Delivernator, Rosie Perez as Ms. Torres, Andy Daly as Officer Keys, Myrna Velasco as Kim, Vladimir Caamaño as Juan Pablo
68	8	"Listen Up!"	Jonathon Wallach	Written by : =Carson Montgomery, Kiana Khansmith & Eric Brown; Storyboarded by : Kiana Khansmith & Eric Brown	Carson Montgomery	July 23, 2022	308	0.22
68	8	"Big Picture"	Jonathon Wallach	Written by : Rachel McNevin, Drew Green & Bernice Sioson; Storyboarded by : Drew Green & Bernice Sioson	Rachel McNevin	July 23, 2022	308	0.22
"Listen Up!": Cricket blows up some poppers, resulting in him losing his hearing. He is forced to fake it when Bill has him perform chores around the house. Meanwhile, Remy, Tilly, Nancy and Gramma play a card game that results in them becoming savage. To resolve it, they destroy the game. Cricket's hearing returns just as his life is in danger, but Bill saves him. Cricket promises to listen more. "Big Picture": Gloria and the Greens go to a drive in movie. Cricket helps Gloria get a good photo for her web profile, Bill and Gramma get lost in the sea of cars with either of them refusing to admit they don’t know how to get back to the truck, and Nancy becomes unnerved for Tilly by the sexist and dated film they are watching. Cricket convinces Gloria that she does not need to justify her life experiences, Bill and Gramma find the truck and Tilly tells Nancy that she will be okay. Guest stars: Luke Lowe as Benny, Dee Bradley Baker as Mr. Banana, Mary Faber as Dr. Ditzy
69	9	"Rembo"	Anna O'Brian	Written by : Laura Eichhorn, Ariel Vracin-Harrell & Nick Sumida; Storyboarded by : Ariel Vracin-Harrell & Nick Sumida	Laura Eichhorn	July 30, 2022 (Note: This episode first premiered on Disney+ in the United States on July 27, 2022, ahead of its official air date.)	309	0.18
69	9	"Dirt Jar"	Anna O'Brian	Written by : Kenny Byerly, Raj Brueggemann & Jen Begeman; Storyboarded by : Raj Brueggemann & Jen Begeman	Kenny Byerly	July 30, 2022	309	0.18
"Rembo": Remy asks Vasquez to teach him martial arts after an encounter with hyenas, but he refuses. Cricket gets Gloria and Gramma to teach him self defense, but he does not seem to pick up anything. Another encounter with the hyenas causes Remy to finally take inspiration from the frilled lizard and scares off the hyenas with Vasquez knocking them out. Vasquez finally accepts that Remy can take care of himself. "Dirt Jar": Cricket loses his dirt jar which contains the dirt of their old home. Bill realizes that he accidentally threw it out and tries to replace it. Flashback reveals the situation that lead to the Greens moving from Smalton to Big City. Bill comes clean to Cricket and they decide to take a road trip back to the old house in Smalton to collect more dirt. Bill sees the For Sale sign in front of their old house and gets a "crazy idea". Guest stars: Wiz Khalifa as Frilled Lizard
70	10	"The Move"	Jonathon Wallach	Written by : Carson Montgomery, Kiana Khansmith, Eric Brown, Raj Brueggemann & Jen Begeman; Storyboarded by : Kiana Khansmith, Eric Brown, Raj Brueggemann & Jen Begeman	Carson Montgomery	September 24, 2022	310	0.29
Everyone hears the news that the Greens are going back to Smalton. After finally being able to afford living at their old farm again, Bill, Tilly, Cricket and Nancy head back to the country with Remy tagging along with every Big City inhabitant they know seeing them off. When they arrive, they struggle to readjust. Cricket and Tilly look for their tree fort in the woods. Bill desperately tries to renovate the house while Nancy attempts to get him to relax. Cricket discovers that he can no longer navigate in the woods and Tilly can no longer communicate with her old woodland animal friends. With help from Remy, they find the tree fort, which is worn down. The family realizes that change is natural and despite the hardships, they are glad to be home again. Guest stars: Cheri Oteri as Gwendolyn Zapp, Raven-Symoné as Maria Media, Betsy Sodaro as Community Sue, Luke Lowe as Benny, Colton Dunn as Brett Eze, Andy Daly as Officer Keys, John Early as Alexander, Tom Kenny as Dan
71	11	"Country Side"	Jonathon Wallach	Written by : Nate Federman, Eric Brown & Kiana Khansmith; Storyboarded by : Eric Brown & Kiana Khansmith	Nate Federman	October 1, 2022	311	0.24
71	11	"Junk Mountain"	Anna O'Brian & Kiana Khansmith	Written by : Rachel McNevin, Raj Brueggemann & Jen Begeman; Storyboarded by : Raj Brueggemann & Jen Begeman	Rachel McNevin	October 1, 2022	311	0.24
"Country Side": When Remy calls the country boring, Cricket decides to use the time to teach him that the country can be fun and end up earning the ire of Bill. Meanwhile, Tilly wants to look for a new living arrangement, but after several failed attempts, Nancy gives Tilly an empty room in the house. Bill catches Cricket and Remy and they are grounded, but find a way to make that fun too. "Junk Mountain": Cricket wants to introduce Remy to his teenage friend Hector at the scrap yard, even though he does not seem too interested to hang out with him, while Tilly tries to look for her future car and ultimately settles on a tire. Despite Hector's politeness, Cricket realizes that his old friend is too far gone and lets him go. Hector's younger sister Lupita takes over playing with Cricket and Remy. Guest stars: Darin De Paul as Good Ol' Joe, Rylee Alazraqui as Lupita, Harvey Guillén as Hector, Ali Stroker as Sunday
72	12	"Farmer Remy"	Anna O'Brian & Kiana Khansmith	Written by : Mary Bronaugh, Ariel Vracin-Harrell & Nick Sumida; Storyboarded by : Ariel Vracin-Harrell & Nick Sumida	Mary Bronaugh	October 8, 2022	312	0.21
72	12	"Homeward Hound"	Anna O'Brian & Kiana Khansmith	Written by : Laura Eichhorn, Drew Green & Bernice Sioson; Storyboarded by : Drew Green & Bernice Sioson	Laura Eichhorn	October 8, 2022	312	0.21
"Farmer Remy": Nancy and Tilly try to train Remy in farm life while Bill trains Cricket to drive the tractor. Bill becomes too cautious, but Cricket proves that he is good at it. Remy cannot seem to do simple tasks with Miss Debbie the cow, until she goes into labor. Trapped by himself, Remy manages to help Miss Debbie give birth, thus making Remy feel accomplished in farming to some degree. "Homeward Hound": Tilly has forgotten Saxon back in Big City and Phoenix ventures off to retrieve him with Melissa the goat and Brenda the cow tagging along. Back in the city, Gramma Alice takes Gloria out clubbing and she realizes that she misses her family. After thwarting an evil attempt by Cogburn the rooster, the animals get Saxon back and Gramma decides to use the animals as an excuse to reunite with her family while Gloria keeps an eye on her house. Guest stars: Jameela Jamil as Phoenix, Alfred Molina as Cogburn
73	13	"Pie Hard"	Anna O'Brian & Kiana Khansmith	Written by : Nate Federman, Ariel Vracin-Harrell & Nick Sumida; Storyboarded by : Ariel Vracin-Harrell & Nick Sumida	Nate Federman	October 15, 2022 (Note: This episode first premiered on Disney+ in the United States on October 12, 2022, ahead of its official air date.)	313	0.24
73	13	"Rat Tail"	Nick Sumida	Written by : Raj Brueggemann, Caldwell Tanner & Bernice Sioson; Storyboarded by : Caldwell Tanner & Bernice Sioson	Raj Brueggemann	October 15, 2022	313	0.24
"Pie Hard": The Greens and Remy visit the local restaurant in Downtown Smalton called meat-wiches where Tilly orders her favorite blueberry pie, Cricket wants the meat-wich to be his "usual" which the waiter Wayne tries to remember and Remy tries to buy something from the gift store for Vasquez. Gramma challenges the restaurant's baker Patti with her pie, before admitting that she was jealous that Tilly liked her pie more than her own, but Tilly comforts her. Cricket soon regrets getting a usual and decides to give up on ordering meat-wiches as soon as he finishes his so that he can try the pie. "Rat Tail": Cricket grows a rat tail, which everyone loves except for Nancy who think it is unpleasant to look at and tries to convince him to get rid of it. Gramma takes Remy in as her knitting apprentice and he soon takes to it by knitting the perfect glove. Nancy admits to hating Cricket's new hairstyle, but was afraid of turning into her father. Cricket cuts off the rat tail to please Nancy. Guest stars: Brooke Dillman as Patti, Tony Cavalero as Wayne, Billy West as Nick
74	14	"Frilly Tilly"	Kiana Khansmith	Written by : Laura Eichhorn, Raj Brueggemann & Jen Begeman; Storyboarded by : Raj Brueggemann & Jen Begeman	Laura Eichhorn	October 22, 2022	314	0.26
74	14	"Montaged"	Jonathon Wallach & Nick Sumida	Written by : Nate Federman, Eric Brown & Gabi Rodea; Storyboarded by : Eric Brown & Gabi Rodea	Nate Federman	October 22, 2022	314	0.26
"Frilly Tilly": Tilly prepares for her coming-of-age ceremony, but instead of following the traditions that Gramma had to follow, she wants to do her own thing. Gramma convinces Tilly that she will be letting her family down by breaking from tradition, but after seeing Tilly and everyone miserable, Gramma admits that she was prevented from breaking tradition and allows Tilly to be original. "Montaged": Cricket wants to ride a wild sheep at the rodeo, but refuses to take his time with it. At Remy's suggestion, he decides to do a training montage to speed up the process. Instead, he, Remy and Tilly get stuck in a series of montages and cannot escape. Cricket realizes that there are no shortcuts and the events of the episode turn out to be a dream as Cricket decides to train honestly at sheep riding. Guest stars: Tony Cavalero as Wayne, Brooke Dillman as Patti, Kimberly Brooks as Tracy, Armen Taylor as Trey
75	15	"Pizza Deliverance"	Kiana Khansmith	Written by : Carson Montgomery, Ariel Vracin-Harrell & Eddie West; Storyboarded by : Ariel Vracin-Harrell & Eddie West	Carson Montgomery	October 29, 2022	315	0.25
75	15	"Horse Girl"	Nick Sumida	Written by : Rachel McNevin, Cassie Zwart & Bernice Sioson; Storyboarded by : Cassie Zwart & Bernice Sioson	Rachel McNevin	October 29, 2022	315	0.25
"Pizza Deliverance": A pizza delivery girl named Tina is sent from Mama Roni's in Big City to deliver pizza to the Greens. After watching a scary movie, Tina sees the family as cannibals that are chasing her. As they hungrily corner her, Nancy barges in and reprimands everyone for being negligent and Tina realizes they are just a normal family. Nevertheless, she gets chased away after getting covered in pizza slop. "Horse Girl": Bill buys a horse named Butterscotch, but Tilly hates horses and hides her hatred for her. Meanwhile, Cricket tries to get Wi-Fi so that he can speak to Gabriella while Remy tries to get through to Vasquez. He successfully does so during a storm which causes Bill to get caught in a raging river and Tilly and Butterscotch team up to save him. Tilly tells Bill that she still hates horses, but that he can still like them. Guest stars: Sydney Park as Tina, Brooke Dillman as Patti, Rylee Alazraqui as Lupita, Jenna Ortega as Gabriella Espinosa
76	16	"Virtually Christmas"	Anna O'Brian; Mark Droste (3D animation director)	Written by : Nate Federman, Laura Eichhorn, Caldwell Tanner & Eddie West; Storyboarded by : Caldwell Tanner & Eddie West	Nate Federman & Laura Eichhorn	December 3, 2022	320	0.26
On Christmas Eve prior to the events of "The Move", Cricket decides to visit Remy so that he can play his VR game Outpost Infinity, despite Bill insisting that he stay to resume their yearly traditions. Cricket ends up getting snowed in with Remy, but the latter reveals that he left a VR present for him at his house and Cricket suggests that they all go into the VR game to celebrate Christmas together. Cricket and Remy do not tell the rest of the Greens that it is a tower defense style game and they end up having fun. When they learn the truth, Cricket admits that he learned to love their traditions and they fight off monsters. However, Cricket decides to leave the game and travel through the snow back home where the family is happy to be reunited with him. Vasquez and the Remingtons also arrive and join the festivities. Guest stars: Lorraine Toussaint as Rashida Remington, Colton Dunn as Russell Remington, Danny Trejo as Vasquez, Alfonso Ribiero as Mr. Extras, Luke Lowe as Benny NOTE: The virtual world of Outpost Infinity was created using Unreal Engine from the team at Disney Interactive.
77	17	"Pen Pals"	Kiana Khansmith	Written by : Nate Federman, Raj Brueggemann & Jen Begeman; Storyboarded by : Raj Brueggemann & Jen Begeman	Nate Federman	March 4, 2023	316	0.20
77	17	"Study Abroad"	Nick Sumida	Written by : Mary Bronaugh, Cassie Zwart & Bernice Sioson; Storyboarded by : Cassie Zwart & Bernice Sioson	Mary Bronaugh	March 4, 2023	316	0.20
"Pen Pals": Tilly starts writing letters to Andromeda to keep up with her. Andromeda reveals that she was a volunteer at the Museum of Cryptozoology only to get "fired". Tilly regales a story of defending daffodils against Bill and sends her seeds. Andromeda implies that she is really sad, which makes Tilly feel the same. Tilly writes a song and sends it to her, and they sing "together". They happily continue being pen pals. "Study Abroad": Remy realizes that he needs to tell his parents what he learned for the week, fearing that he will be taken back to Big City if he has nothing to tell them. The entire Green family try to teach him to lie, with the exception of Bill who tells him to just tell the truth. Remy's parents call and they disbelieve his fantastical story, resulting in him telling the truth. Remy is then reassured by his parents that it is okay if he didn't learn anything over the week but gets punished for lying by having to write an essay. Guest stars: Andy Daly as Officer Keys, Stephanie Sheh as Kiki, Luke Lowe as Benny, Danny Trejo as Vasquez, Colton Dunn as Russell Remington, Lorraine Toussaint as Rashida Remington
78	18	"Honey Heist"	Nick Sumida	Written by : Laura Eichhorn, Eric Brown & Gabi Rodea; Storyboarded by : Eric Brown & Gabi Rodea	Laura Eichhorn	March 11, 2023	317	0.24
78	18	"Dog Mayor"	Nick Sumida	Written by : Carson Montgomery, Cassie Zwart & Bernice Sioson; Storyboarded by : Cassie Zwart & Bernice Sioson	Carson Montgomery	March 11, 2023	317	0.24
"Honey Heist": Cricket, Tilly and Remy plot to steal Bill's collected honey. Cricket decides to recruit Nancy, despite Tilly and Remy believing that she has become too responsible. She joins, but just as they are collecting the honey, suddenly rats them out. Afterwards, Nancy reveals that she acquired honey for the kids and sold them out so that she could cause a distraction, admitting that while she is responsible, she can still have fun. "Dog Mayor": Cricket and Remy start a campaign to get Phoenix elected as the Mayor of Smalton after another dog named Beans owned by a man named Ernie proves to be well liked. Meanwhile, Nancy and Tilly fix a road full of pot holes and despite the hard work, get help in the end. Cricket resorts to lying and cheating. While he wins at first, Cricket is suddenly outed. He later admits that he no longer cares what other people think of Phoenix as he loves his dog the way she is. Guest stars: Lance Barber as Frank, Tim Baltz as Ernie, Kimberly Brooks as Tracy, Armen Taylor as Trey, Dee Bradley Baker as Phoenix
79	19	"Chill Bill"	Kiana Khansmith	Written by : Mary Bronaugh, Ariel Vracin-Harrell & Eddie West; Storyboarded by : Ariel Vracin-Harrell & Eddie West	Mary Bronaugh	March 18, 2023	318	0.18
79	19	"Bunny Farm"	Nick Sumida	Written by : Kenny Byerly, Eric Brown & Gabi Rodea; Storyboarded by : Eric Brown & Gabi Rodea	Kenny Byerly	March 18, 2023	318	0.18
"Chill Bill": The Greens and Remy head to the lake where Bill suddenly becomes a loose and carefree partygoer, much to Cricket's pleasure. Meanwhile, Tilly gets a leech stuck to her and Remy gets lost on a raft. Cricket tries to prevent Bill from seeing the dangers to keep him calm, but he ultimately returns to normal to help everyone. Bill tells Cricket that people have different sides to them and their bond grows closer. "Bunny Farm": Bunnies attack the farm and Nancy recruits their neighbors from the past episodes to help. Bill does not think that they are capable of helping, which appears to be the case, but Bill admits that he is nervous because he does not want to lose the farm. He has Nancy take over and she snaps everyone in line to fulfil their duties and save the farm. Bill realizes that Nancy has matured significantly. Guest stars: Ali Stroker as Sunday, Tony Cavalero as Wayne, Brook Dillman as Patti, Darin De Paul as Gold Ol' Joe, Harvey Guillén as Hector, Armen Taylor as Trey, Kimberly Brooks as Tracy, Rylee Alazraqui as Lupita
80	20	"Long Goodbye"	Kiana Khansmith	Written by : Rachel McNevin, Raj Brueggemann, Jen Begeman, Ariel Vracin-Harrell & Eddie West; Storyboarded by : Rachel McNevin, Raj Brueggemann, Jen Begeman, Ariel Vracin-Harrell & Eddie West	Rachel McNevin	March 25, 2023	319	0.17
Gramma and Remy are ready to return to Big City. Bill, Cricket, and Tilly decide to accompany them back home while Nancy stays on the farm. The gang are reunited with familiar places and old friends, but quickly becomes apparent that Cricket, Tilly and Bill do not want to leave and practically hold Gramma and Remy against their will. Vasquez, awaiting Remy's arrival, grows concerned while Gloria is waiting for Gramma to return so that she can sign a paper from notary public Merv Stampington who is due to retire. They chase down the Greens and manage to get Alice and Remy back in time. Cricket, Tilly, and Bill return to Smalton, but an encounter with Nancy convinces them to live in both Big City and Smalton, moving back and forth while Nancy stays on the farm to look after it. Unbeknownst to everyone, Chip Whistler, who was thought to be dead, is still alive and plotting his revenge on the Greens. Guest stars: Andy Daly as Officer Keys, Paul Scheer as Chip Whistler, Danny DeVito as Merv Stampington, Maurice LaMarche as Mr. Grigorian, Nicole Byer as Andromeda, Tom Gammill as Doug Perkins, Colton Dunn as Brett Eze and Russell Remington, Lorraine Toussaint as Rashida, Stephanie Sheh as Kiki, Nikki Castillo as Gabriella, Lamar Woods as Weezie, Luke Lowe as Benny, Betsy Sodaro as Community Sue
