= The Move (Big City Greens) =

- Big City Greens episode
- Title card
- Episode no.: Season 3 Episode 10
- Directed by: Jonathon Wallach
- Written by: Kiana Khansmith; Eric Brown; Raj Brueggemann; Jen Begeman
- Production code: 310
- Original air date: September 24, 2022
- Running time: 22 minutes

Episode chronology
← Previous "Dirt Jar"	Next → "Country Side"
- Big City Greens season 3

"The Move" is the tenth episode of the third season of the American animated television series Big City Greens, and the 70th episode of the series overall. "The Move" originally aired in the United States on September 24, 2022, on Disney Channel. In this episode, the Greens return to their old home in Smalton, though its not how they remember it.

== Plot ==
Following the events of "Dirt Jar", everyone hears the news that the Greens are going back to Smalton. After finally being able to afford living at their old farm again, Bill, Tilly, Cricket and Nancy head back to the country with Remy tagging along with every Big City inhabitant they know seeing them off. When they arrive, they struggle to readjust. Cricket and Tilly look for their old tree fort. Bill desperately tries to renovate the house while Nancy attempts to get him to relax. Cricket discovers that he can no longer navigate in the woods and Tilly can no longer communicate with her old woodland animal friends. With help from Remy, they find the tree fort, which is worn down. The family realizes that change is natural and despite the hardships, they are glad to be home again.

== Voice cast ==
- Chris Houghton as Cricket Green
- Marieve Herington as Tilly Green
- Bob Joles as Bill Green
- Artemis Pebdani as Alice Green
- Wendi McLendon-Covey as Nancy Green
- Zeno Robinson as Remy Remington

== Production ==
Big City Greens was renewed for a third season on January 13, 2021. The season was produced mostly at home, due to the fact that it was greenlit around the time of the COVID-19 pandemic. Prior to the episode's premiere, a clip from the episode featuring the song "When I Get Home" was released.

This episode was directed by Jonathon Wallach, written by Kiana Khansmith, Eric Brown, Raj Brueggemann and Jen Begeman, and storyboarded by Carson Montgomery, Kiana Khansmith, Eric Brown, Raj Brueggemann & Jen Begeman.

== Ratings ==
The episode received 0.29 million viewers on its premiere. Tony Betti of Laughing Place listed this episode as one of his favorites from the third season.
