= Squashed! =

Third season premiere of Big City Greens

- Big City Greens episode
- Title card
- Episode no.: Season 3 Episode 1
- Directed by: Anna O'Brian
- Written by: Ariel Vracin-Harrell; Destiny Wood; Raj Brueggeman; Kiana Khansmith; Rachel McNevin
- Production code: 301
- Original air date: October 9, 2021
- Running time: 22 minutes

Episode chronology
← Previous "Gloria's Café"	Next → "Boss Life"
- Big City Greens season 3

"Squashed!" is the season premiere of the third season of the American animated television series Big City Greens. A double length Halloween television special, the episode originally aired on Disney Channel on October 9, 2021. In this episode, Tilly Green steals Gwendolyn Zapp's alien chemical compound to make her father Bill’s pumpkins grow bigger.

== Plot ==
The Greens celebrate their second Big City Halloween, hoping that this year's events will not be like the last. Cricket decides to go as a trickster named "Trickor", while Tilly opts to go as Bill. Meanwhile, on Mars, BigTech CEO Gwendolyn Zapp barely escapes danger, having just tested a new experiment. With the BigTech Mars outpost compromised, Gwendolyn returns to Earth to continue experimenting. Bill and Tilly head to BigTech headquarters to make a delivery of tiny pumpkins. While there, Gwendolyn shows the two a group of large vegetables, having used a compound named "Compound 415C" to genetically modify them to grow big. While Tilly is interested in the compound, Bill declines the request due to the safety risks it would pose. Seeing this, Tilly sneaks the compound home.

As the Greens continue to prepare for their Halloween festivities, Remy and bodyguard Vasquez arrive, both dressed up as dinosaurs. Cricket hands Vasquez fruit punch, but he places a rubber spider inside the drink that triggers Vasquez's guard instincts. Bill and Tilly return home, the former dejected and the latter sneaking off to the backyard pumpkin patch to try the compound. Immediately, the pumpkins grow large, but Tilly does not know they had also become sentient. Some time later, the Greens' house is filled with guests, and festivities had just begun. Tilly takes Bill outside to show him the pumpkins; he is surprised and impressed by the new development. As the two head back inside, one of the pumpkins disappear.

Having witnessed the pumpkin's disappearance, Tilly feels that something is off. She is immediately alerted by the screams of a terrified Cricket, but ends up getting tricked by him. However, a real, sentient pumpkin ambushes Remy; when Cricket's fake mallet does not work, Tilly hits the pumpkin with a baseball bat, killing it. Tilly confesses the truth to Cricket and Remy, who agree to help her sort out her pumpkin problem. They stop the party to tell the guests to leave, but all the guests - including Gloria - are gradually assimilated. Nancy holds the pumpkins off, but too is assimilated. Tilly also witnesses her father get assimilated, and the surviving kids are almost ambushed by a pumpkin, but Tilly destroys it, freeing Vasquez. The pumpkins retreat to the shed, where they have completely assimilated Bill.

The survivors deduce that the pumpkins are building something. Tilly frees Bill and confesses the truth to him; he is disappointed in her daughter, who relinquishes her Bill hat. Having dropped it on the floor, it activates a group of eggs and powers up a powerful pumpkin that destroys the shed. As more pumpkin eggs hatch, creating a swarm of smaller pumpkins, Bill and Tilly, along with Vasquez, Cricket and Remy, begin to fight all the pumpkins. However, the pumpkins start to manifest around the Greens' house, creating a transmitter that emits a signal that turns all the pumpkins in Big City sentient.

Cricket distracts the big pumpkin while Tilly starts the lawnmower, running it over and freeing the captives. As Nancy finally understands Cricket's Trickor persona, Tilly apologizes to Bill for starting the pumpkin apocalypse. Bill tells Tilly that as they make mistakes, people will eventually grow. Suddenly, Gwendolyn arrives, prepared to stop the apocalypse, but Bill and Tilly tell her they had already dealt with it. Gwendolyn returns to Mars, as it too gets taken over by the pumpkins.

== Voice cast ==
- Chris Houghton as Cricket Green
- Marieve Herington as Tilly Green
- Bob Joles as Bill Green
- Artemis Pebdani as Alice Green
- Wendi McLendon-Covey as Nancy Green
- Zeno Robinson as Remy Remington
- Danny Trejo as Vasquez
- Anna Akana as Gloria Sato
- Cheri Oteri as Gwendolyn Zapp
- Luke Lowe as Benny
- Betsy Sodaro as Community Sue
- Andy Daly as Officer Keys
- John Early as Alexander
- Monica Ray as Kiki Kitashima
- Lamar Woods as Weezie Eastman
- Colton Dunn as Brett Eze

== Production ==
"Squashed!" was directed by frequent series director Anna O'Brian, storyboarded by Ariel Vracin-Harrell, Destiny Wood, Raj Brueggeman and Kiana Khansmith, and written by Vracin-Harrell, Wood, Brueggeman, Khansmith and Rachel McNevin.

== Reception ==
"Squashed!" was watched by 0.39 million viewers on the day of its premiere, and received generally positive critical reviews. Tony Betti of Laughing Place rated the episode an 8.5 out of 10, writing that the episode is a "great welcome back for the series." Furthermore, he later listed it as one of his favorites from the third season. Jeanine Yamanaka of AllEars.net gave a positive review, writing that the episode is "fun, fast-paced, and not too scary for younger viewers, as it becomes quickly evident the head-munching leaves no permanent damage." Tessa Smith of Mama's Geeky also gave a positive review, writing, "when it comes to Halloween specials, there is something they always need to be — spooky! And Big City Greens Halloween special does a great job of that. There are jump scares, a truly scary plot, and a lot of fun costumes."
