= Green Christmas (Big City Greens) =

- Big City Greens episode
- Title card
- Episode no.: Season 2 Episode 4
- Directed by: Monica Ray
- Written by: Amy Hudkins, Kiana Khansmith, Caldwell Tanner and Jonathan Wallach
- Production code: 203
- Original air date: December 7, 2019
- Running time: 22 minutes

Guest appearance
- Christopher Lloyd as Santa Claus

Episode chronology
← Previous "Bad Influencer"	Next → "Reckoning Ball"
- Big City Greens season 2

"Green Christmas" is the fourth broadcast episode of the second season of the American animated sitcom Big City Greens, and the 34th episode of the series overall. "Green Christmas" originally aired in the United States on December 7, 2019, on Disney Channel.

In this episode, when Cricket realizes he may be on Santa's naughty list, he tries to redeem himself before Christmas day.

== Plot ==
The Greens celebrate their first Big City Christmas, singing about their favorite things about Christmas. ("The Best Part of Christmas") On Christmas Eve, Tilly tells Cricket that he has done many wrongdoings, therefore putting him on the naughty list. However, she tells him he can still make the nice list, by performing enough good deeds. Meanwhile, Bill takes Nancy and Alice to do all-day Christmas activities, eventually culminating in him giving the two their presents.

Cricket and Tilly run off to do good deeds, ("Good Deeds are Good Indeed") but Cricket is soon exhausted. Wanting to expedit the process, he decides to talk to the mall Santa himself, but runs into a long line. He encounters Gloria, who is dressed up as an elf, but she is tricked by the apparent sight of her crush, Kevin. With Gloria out of the way, Cricket cuts the line all the way to talk to the mall Santa. However, he is shocked by the many bad deeds Cricket has done, and when one of the kids in line complains of Cricket's cutting, he waves him off; Gloria has also spotted him, calling for security. He attempts to make a messy escape, but is caught by security; having clung to the mall Santa's pants, Cricket inadvertently rips them off his legs. The mall Santa assigns him to the naughty list, and he is kicked out of the store by security.

Tilly sees a dejected Cricket at Big City Park. Cricket decides to perform Christmas pranks in the hopes that nobody will celebrate Christmas, which horrifies Tilly. ("If I Can't Have Christmas") Meanwhile, realizing they had not gotten Bill a gift, Alice and Nancy rush out to get him one. The other Greens go caroling at Remy's mansion, ("Christmas is Here") creating a perfect opportunity for Nancy and Alice to sneak away; however, all the shops have closed for Christmas Eve. Now completely naughty, Cricket plans to moon all of Big City. Tilly tries to stop him, but their fight on the big Big City Christmas tree ends in the tree falling, and her being branded the one who ruined Christmas by not only news reporter Maria Media, but the mall Santa.

Tilly is devastated, but Cricket is overjoyed with her inclusion in the naughty list. ("Christmas is Busted") As a snowstorm begins, Tilly runs off, with Cricket trailing behind. Cricket soon realizes that what he did was wrong. ("No Christmas At All") However, the real Santa sits next to him, offering him any a gift he would be interested in, but Cricket declines the offer; he wants Tilly to be on the nice list, and also wants a way back home. Meanwhile, Nancy and Alice are lost, and Bill is frustrated that everyone had left him. However, he is called into action by a blizzard warning, going out into the blizzard to save Nancy, Alice, and Cricket. Everyone but Bill looks on in sadness as he drives them home.

The following day, Cricket tells Tilly about his encounter with Santa, which he used to get her back on the nice list. Grateful, she hugs Cricket as the others arrive. Nancy and Alice tells Bill they did not get presents, but he gestures to a poorly-made statue the two made for him the previous day. Nancy then pledges to do the Christmas activities she and Alice skipped out on, as Tilly points out a present with Cricket's name on it; he, too, is on the nice list because of his selfless act of putting Tilly's needs before his. The Greens sing once more about their favorite parts of Christmas, ending the episode. ("The Best Part of Christmas (Reprise)")

== Voice cast ==
- Chris Houghton as Cricket Green
- Marieve Herington as Tilly Green
- Bob Joles as Bill Green
- Artemis Pebdani as Alice Green
- Wendi McLendon-Covey as Nancy Green
- Zeno Robinson as Remy Remington
- Anna Akana as Gloria Sato
- Raven-Symoné as Maria Media
- Christopher Lloyd as Santa Claus
- Jeff Bennett
- Shane Houghton

== Production ==
Big City Greens was renewed by Disney Channel for a second season on May 17, 2018, ahead of the first season's premiere.

As a holiday-themed television special and musical, this episode was directed by Monica Ray, and written and storyboarded by Amy Hudkins, Kiana Khansmith, Caldwell Tanner and Jonathan Wallach. The episode contains seven songs. This episode was produced third in the season, but was aired as the fourth episode.

== Reception ==
The episode received 0.43 million viewers on its premiere. Laughing Place states, "the episode features an expertly balanced mix of humor and heart that I believe will make it a Disney Christmas classic."
