= Oakville Waterfront Festival =

Annual festival in Ontario

Coordinates: 43°24′28″N 79°41′32″W

- Dates: August 2–4, 2013
- Locations: Coronation Park, Oakville, Ontario
- Years active: 18
- Website: http://www.oakvillewaterfrontfestival.ca

The Oakville Waterfront Festival was an annual festival in Oakville, Ontario from 1992 to 2009, which was revived for one time in 2013.

During its run, Oakville Waterfront Festival attracted a diverse audience of as many as 50,000 annually.

The festival featured concerts, a community stage, craft show, children's village, theme park, interactive games and more. Over the years, headliners at the concerts have included Hedley, Jann Arden, Tom Cochrane, Jesse Cook, Finger Eleven, Great Big Sea, Alannah Miles, Jully Black, Blue Rodeo, Colin James, Susan Aglukark, Michelle Wright, Jacksoul, Justin Hines, Bedouin Soundclash, The Philosopher Kings, The Johnstones No Warning and Ill Scarlett.

== 2010 Cancellation ==
On December 3, 2009, the Oakville Beaver released an article interviewing Kirk Sloane, board chair of the waterfront festival, where he stated that the 2010 Waterfront Festival would be canceled due to the $30,000 deficit after 2009's festival.

== 2013 Return ==
It was announced March 5, 2013, that the Waterfront Festival would return in the summer, from August 2 to 4 2013. Musical acts for 2013 included Kathleen Edwards, 54-40, Corb Lund, Lindi Ortega, Hannah Georgas, Elliott Brood and more.
