= Big City Greens the Movie: Spacecation =

2024 film directed by Anna O'Brian

- Promotional poster
- Genre: Science fiction Musical; Comedy
- Based on: Big City Greens by The Houghton Brothers
- Written by: Lacey Dyer; Julia Layton; Mike Yank; Shane Houghton; Chris Houghton
- Directed by: Anna O'Brian
- Starring: Chris Houghton; Marieve Herington; Bob Joles; Artemis Pebdani; Wendi McLendon-Covey; Anna Akana; Cheri Oteri; Renée Elise Goldsberry
- Music by: Joachim Horsley
- Country of origin: United States
- Original language: English

Production
- Executive producers: Chris Houghton; Shane Houghton
- Producer: Michael Coughlin
- Editor: Dave Geis
- Running time: 82 minutes
- Production company: Disney Television Animation

Original release
- Network: Disney Channel
- Release: June 6, 2024

Related
- Big City Greens

Big City Greens the Movie: Spacecation is a 2024 American animated science fiction musical comedy film based on the Disney Channel animated television series Big City Greens, created by The Houghton Brothers. The film was directed by Anna O'Brian and written by Lacey Dyer, Julia Layton, Mike Yank, and Shane and Chris Houghton. It stars the voices of series regulars Chris Houghton, Marieve Herington, Bob Joles, Artemis Pebdani, Wendi McLendon-Covey, and Anna Akana, along with Cheri Oteri and Renée Elise Goldsberry. In the film, Cricket Green thrusts himself and his family into an experimental farming mission in space that soon devolves into chaos, while his ideas test his relationship with his father, Bill.

The development of a Big City Greens film at Disney Television Animation was announced in January 2022, although the script had already been written a year earlier. The original songs featured in the film were written during lockdown due to the COVID-19 pandemic. Animation services were provided by Rough Draft Korea and Sugarcube, whilst series composer Joachim Horsley composed the film's score.

Big City Greens the Movie: Spacecation premiered on Disney Channel on June 6, 2024, and was released on Disney+ the following day. The film garnered a combined viewing audience of 292,000 viewers and received a 0.07 overall rating among adults between the ages of 18 and 49. It received positive reviews from critics for its humor and writing.

== Plot ==
Cricket is upset that the Green Family road trip will be the same as it was last year. As the family goes to drop off produce to Gwendolyn Zapp at BigTech, Cricket learns that she is developing a farm on an asteroid and has built a space hotel, but only the wealthy, such as Remy and his family, can attend. When Zapp learns that her farm bots are poorly programmed, she tries to get the Greens to agree to go into space. Bill turns her down, but Cricket strikes a deal with Gwendolyn that they can farm on the asteroid for them in return for a free stay at the space hotel, and convinces Bill and the rest of the family to go, claiming that it is a simulator. They eventually learn that it is real when Bill is nearly sucked into space; he is saved by a dutiful astronaut named Colleen Voyd, while Tilly befriends a small gooey creature that destroys glass, whom she names Cookie. Feeling that Voyd is stomping on their fun, Cricket and Gramma Alice trap her in a cryo-pod.

When the Greens arrive on the farm asteroid, they are attacked by the farm bots, forcing Tilly and Alice to release Voyd. Voyd, however, uses the only escape pod to send some of the produce back to earth to fulfill Zapp's requests. Nevertheless, they learn that there is a way to shut off the robots via the energy compound on the other end of the asteroid. Due to the destruction of the compound, the farm silos proceed to explode, dislodging the asteroid from orbit. Cricket and Bill argue over their predicament due to Cricket's ideas throughout the series and their relationship with each other, resulting in Cricket disowning Bill before the compound explodes and sends everyone hurdling through space. Meanwhile, on Earth, the Greens' antics are broadcast on the news and Nancy and Gloria go to BigTech to get answers. Zapp captures them and reveals that her goal to farm in space stems from her wanting to gloat over her Kindergarten teacher Mrs. Kay, who called her dreams a "fantasy".

When the produce arrives, Mrs. Kay congratulates Zapp, but she finds it unfulfilling and decides to flee to Mars after learning that the asteroid is headed towards Big City. Nancy and Gloria must work together to contact everyone using Alice's robotic leg, and the Greens and Voyd get together. As Cricket and Bill make up, the group head to the space hotel to use the facility's tractor beam to grab the asteroid. Cricket and Bill work together to get the beam's power working and bring the asteroid back to them. With Remy's help, all the guests conga line off the hotel to the escape pods. Tilly gives Cookie to Voyd as she departs. The hotel is destroyed as everyone safely escapes. While the Greens wait for a rescue pod, they decide to spend part of their vacation flying through space.

During the credits, Gwendolyn is booed for abandoning Earth and leaving the Greens and Voyd to suffer, while Voyd becomes the captain of the BigTech space fleet.

== Voice cast ==
- Chris Houghton as Cricket Green
- Marieve Herington as Tilly Green
- Bob Joles as Bill Green
- Artemis Pebdani as Gramma Alice
- Wendi McLendon-Covey as Nancy Green
- Anna Akana as Gloria Sato
- Cheri Oteri as Gwendolyn Zapp
- Renée Elise Goldsberry as Colleen Voyd
- Anna O'Brian as Cookie
- Zeno Robinson as Remy
- Jack McBrayer as Farmbots
- Raven-Symoné as Maria Media
- Joe Lo Truglio as BigTech Scientist
- Lorraine Toussaint as Rashida
- Darin De Paul as Narrator
- John Early as Alexander
- Andy Daly as Officer Keys
- Barbara Goodson as Mrs. Kay
- Scott Kelly as himself

== Production ==
=== Development ===
In January 2022, it was reported that a musical film based on the Disney Channel animated series Big City Greens was in development at Disney Television Animation. It was announced for a simultaneous release on Disney Channel and Disney+. BCG director Anna O'Brian returned to direct the film, with series creators Chris and Shane Houghton executive-producing. The film stars the series' regular voice cast as well as guest stars Cheri Oteri, Jack McBrayer, and Raven-Symoné reprising their roles from the show, with Renée Elise Goldsberry and Joe Lo Truglio voicing new characters. Astronaut Scott Kelly also makes a cameo as himself. The film was developed in conjunction to the series; due to this, the Houghton brothers had to increase the size of their crew, with part of the crew working on the film and others back-and-forth between the film and the series.

=== Writing and animation ===
The script had already been written a year before its announcement. The duo originally considered making a story with series antagonist Chip Whistler, before deciding the film should be a stand-alone story as to avoid alienating audiences unfamiliar with the show. For the film, the Houghton brothers wanted to do something that couldn't be done in the series. Shane said they wanted it to feel like a big event and spectacle, with Chris adding that the story had to be one that could only be told in the longer format. Due to this, the producers decided to set the film primarily in space, which they felt "has always been in the DNA of [the] series" and it would continue with its "fish out of water" themes. The duo made sure to implement lore and characterizations preestablished in the series as a way to incorporate the film's space setting while staying faithful to the series' tone. The production team visited the NASA Jet Propulsion Laboratory for research during development.

The brothers wanted to further explore the relationship between Cricket and Bill, something they felt the feature-length format would allow them to explore "an emotional depth" that couldn't be properly depicted within a 11-minute timeframe. In spite of the film's larger scope, the duo wanted it to remain grounded, "so [they] wanted everything to just feel a little bigger tell in the series". The writers also had the characters of Gloria and Nancy to interact, which they rarely do in the series, on Earth as a way to showcase what happens on Earth during the events of the film while also exploring new character dynamics. The producers had to change the film's climax after a test projection with executives as they felt it wasn't working properly.

Animation services were provided by Rough Draft Korea and Sugarcube, both of whom had previously provided animation for the series, with CG animation provided by Lemon Sky Studios. Justin Martin served as art director. The Houghton brothers decided to incorporate CG-animated vehicles, despite the series making little use of CG background elements, as a time-saving measure for animators. The animating teams at Rough Draft Korea and Sugarcube had to be expanded from those that worked the series for the film. Unlike the series, the film was made using a layout, with season 1 executive producer Rob Renzetti serving as timing director.

=== Music ===
Big City Greens composer Joachim Horsley was announced to return to score the film. Songs for the film were written during lockdown due to the COVID-19 pandemic. The final versions of the songs and the score were recorded at the John Williams Music Stage at Sony Pictures Studios with a full orchestra. A soundtrack album was released by Walt Disney Records on June 7, 2024, the day after the film's television premiere.

== Release and reception ==
=== Ratings ===
Big City Greens the Movie: Spacecation premiered on Disney Channel on June 6, 2024, followed by its release on Disney+ the next day. On its Disney Channel premiere, the film received 178,000 total viewers with a rating of 0.06. This included 65,500 viewers aged 18–49, earning it a 0.05 rating in that demographic. The film was viewed in 112,500 households with a 0.09 household rating. The Disney XD simulcast received 114,000 total viewers with a 0.04 rating, including 26,400 viewers aged 18–49, earning it a 0.02 rating in that demographic.

=== Critical response ===
Diondra Brown of Common Sense Media gave the film a 4 out of 5 star rating, praising its humor and themes of family. They said, "Big City Greens the Movie: Spacecation has the same lovable qualities as the show Big City Greens; a lot of the humor makes this a fun co-viewing experience for children and adults alike." Tessa Smith of Mama's Geeky praised the film for its story, writing and pacing, animation, and songs. She felt that it worked great for both fans and newcomers of the series and said, "Big City Greens the Movie: Spacecation is a blast for the whole family. Not only is it absolutely hilarious, it is going to pull at your heartstrings as well." Brian Orndoff of Blu-ray.com gave the film an 8 out of 10 star rating. He praised the writing, humor, and voice performances and called the film an "entertaining expansion of an already delightful series." David Kaldor of Bubbleblabber gave the film an 8 out of 10 rating, and commended it for its accessibility to new viewers, writing, and humor.

=== Accolades ===
Award	Date of ceremony	Category	Recipient(s)	Result	Ref.
Annie Awards	February 8, 2025	Outstanding Achievement for Directing in an Animated Television / Broadcast Production	Anna O'Brian	Nominated	
Annie Awards	February 8, 2025	Outstanding Achievement for Music in an Animated Television / Broadcast Production	Joachim Horsley	Nominated	
