= Marieve Herington =

Canadian actress

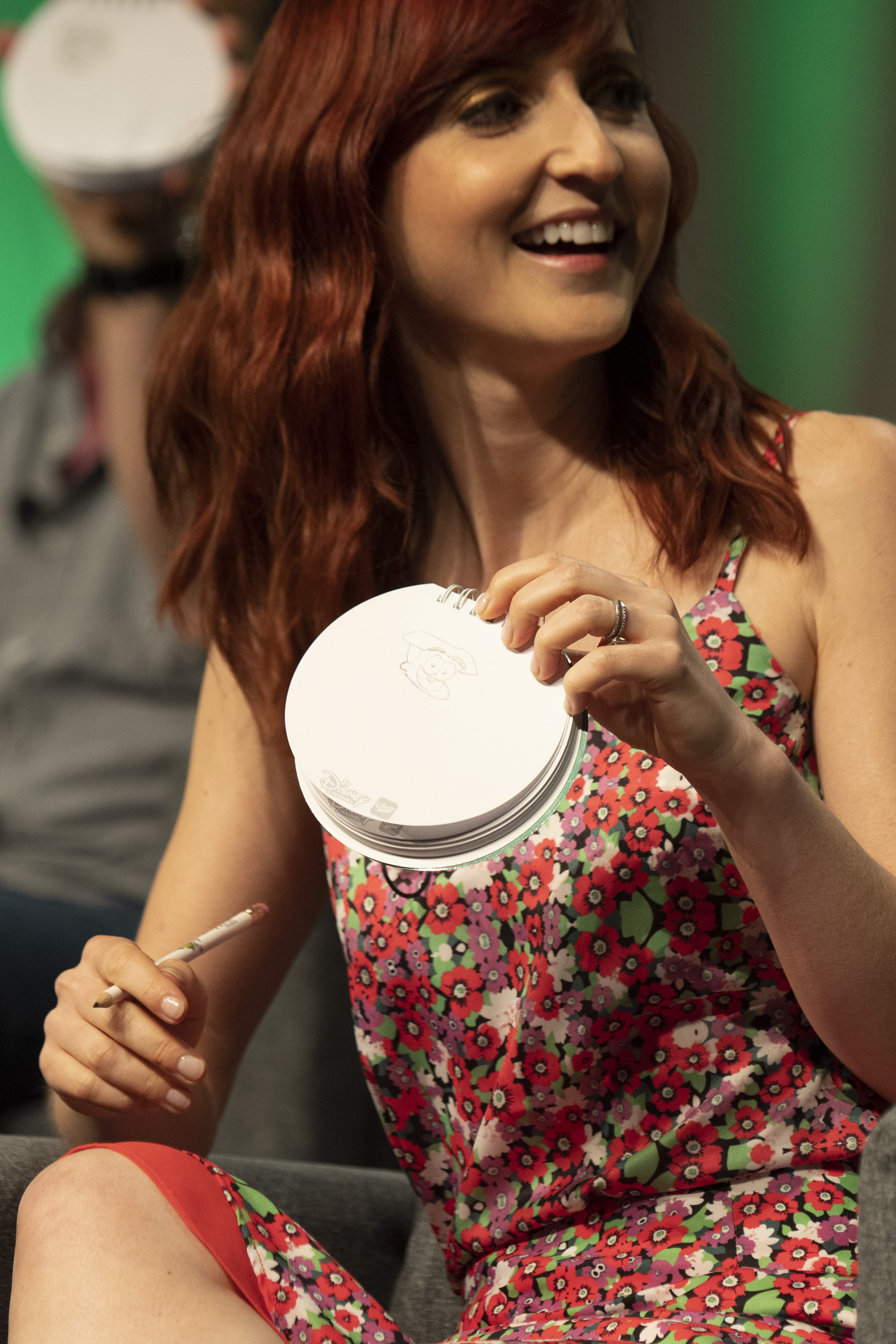
- Herington in 2019
- Born: Oakville, Ontario, Canada
- Citizenship: Canada; United States
- Occupations: Actress; singer
- Years active: 1996–present
- Website: marieveherington.com

Marieve Herington is a Canadian actress who has appeared in recurring roles on How I Met Your Mother, Good Luck Charlie, and Ever After High. She provides the voice of Tilly Green on the Disney Channel series Big City Greens as well as voices in various Japanese anime television series such as Honoka Kousaka in Love Live! School Idol Project and Tatsumaki in One Punch Man. At the age of 12, she began singing in major public performances. Since the age of 16, she has been fronting her own jazz ensembles. Currently, she performs with the Marieve Herington Band.

== Early life and career ==
Herington was born in Oakville, Ontario to Claudette (née Sirico) and Gordon Herington, who died in 2003 when she was 15. She attended St. Mildred's-Lightbourn School and studied drama at the University of Toronto.

Appearing in a series of Canadian Tire and KFC commercials, she joined the Alliance of Canadian Cinema, Television and Radio Artists (ACTRA) at the age of 9.

Her first jazz group, Marieve and her Midnight Blues, played the annual Downtown Oakville Jazz Festival, Oakville Waterfront Festival, restaurants, and other local events. Her first album, Blossoming, published under her own label Maribelle Records, was made available on the Timely Manor label distributed through Fontana North/Universal. She performed on the Toronto jazz circuit with Babes in Jazzland and members of The Royal Jelly Orchestra, appearing on two more albums.

She sang the theme songs for CBC Television's Sesame Park, Nelvana's Pippi Longstocking, and TVOntario's Marigold's Mathemagics.

Herington moved to Los Angeles in 2008. The Marieve Herington Band performs in southern California and Toronto. Their latest album is Midnight Sessions.

On April 14, 2021, Herington announced that she became an American citizen.

Herington served as a dialogue and voice director for Big City Greens (since season 3) and Kiana Mai's Pretty Pretty Please I Don't Want to Be a Magical Girl.

== Filmography ==
=== Animation ===
Year	Title	Role	Notes	Source
1997	Pippi Longstocking	Kids	Theme Song vocalist	
1998	Franklin	Otter	Ep. "Franklin and Otter's Visit"	
2002	Girlstuff/Boystuff	Kimberley, Jenna	Eps. "Lip Gloss Queen / Breaking Up Is Hard to Do"	
2005–08	Delilah & Julius	Delilah Devonshire	Main role	
2009–10	Pearlie	Pearlie	Lead role	
2013–15	Hubert & Takako	Takako	as Lindsay Torrance	
2013	Regular Show	Additional voices	Eps. "Bank Shot"	
2014–15	Doc McStuffins	Tavia, Waddly Penguin	Eps. "Mirror Mirror on My Penguin / "Hike and Eek!" / "Doc McStuffins Goes to Washington"	
2015	Space Pirate Captain Harlock	Yuki	Live-action dub	
2015	Miraculous: Tales of Ladybug & Cat Noir	Sabrina	Season 1 and Season 2 Ep. "Despair Bear"	
2016–17	The Lion Guard	Ogopa, Zigo	Eps. "Too Many Termites" / "The Ukumbusho Tradition"	
2016	The Tom and Jerry Show	Elle	Eps. "Bringing Down the House"	
2018	Mickey and the Roadster Racers	Celeste	Eps. "Phantom of the Café"	
2018–present	Big City Greens	Tilly Green	Nominated — Daytime Emmy Award for Outstanding Performer in an Animated Program (2019–2020), also dialogue director (since season 3)	
2020	Archibald's Next Big Thing	Ricotta	Eps. "A Taste of Crackridge"	
2020	Steven Universe Future	Jasmine	Eps. "In Dreams"	
2022	The Ghost and Molly McGee	Jilly McGee	Eps. "Twin Trouble"	
2022–present	Chibiverse	Tilly Green	8 episodes	
2023–25	Tiny Toons Looniversity	Fifi La Fume	5 episodes	
2024	Rock Paper Scissors	Customer Service Rep/Wealthy Old Lady	Eps. "Six Pieces of Turkey"	
2025	Pretty Pretty Please I Don't Want to Be a Magical Girl	Sidney the Kidney Girl	also voice director	
2025	StuGo	Zora the Owl	Eps. "Night Mutants"	

=== Anime ===
Year	Title	Role	Notes	Source
2014–15	Knights of Sidonia	Yuhata Midorikawa	as Lindsay Torrance also Battle for Planet Nine	
2015	The Seven Deadly Sins	Vivian		
2016	Love Live!	Honoka Kosaka	also season 2 and movie	
2016	Cyborg 009 VS Devilman	Eva Maria Parrales	as Lindsay Torrance	
2016	Hunter × Hunter	Leroute	2011 series	
2016	Charlotte	Medoki	Eps. 6, 9–13	
2016	The Asterisk War	Nana Andersen	Ep. 10	
2016–17	One-Punch Man	Tatsumaki	also OVAs, succeeded by Corina Boettger in Season 2	
2020	Magia Record	Tsuruno Yui		

=== Films ===
Year	Title	Role	Notes	Source
2004	Evel Knievel	Candy Striper		
2012	Ice Age: Continental Drift	Additional voices		
2013	Alpha and Omega 2: A Howl-iday Adventure	Claudette	as Lindsay Torrance	
2014	Alpha and Omega 3: The Great Wolf Games	Claudette	as Lindsay Torrance	
2014	Alpha and Omega 4: The Legend of the Saw Tooth Cave	Claudette	as Lindsay Torrance	
2015	Ever After High: Spring Unsprung	Brooke Page		
2015	Alpha and Omega: Family Vacation	Claudette	as Lindsay Torrance	
2015	Ever After High: Way Too Wonderland	Brooke Page, Darling Charming		
2016	Ever After High: Dragon Games	Brooke Page, Darling Charming		
2016	Alpha and Omega: Dino Digs	Claudette	as Lindsay Torrance	
2016	Top Cat Begins	Panther		
2016	Love Live! The School Idol Movie	Honoka Kosaka		
2016	Ever After High: Epic Winter	Brooke Page		
2016	Sausage Party	Additional voices		
2016	The Wild Life	Kiki	as Lindsay Torrance	
2016	Alpha and Omega: The Big Fureeze	Claudette	as Lindsay Torrance	
2017	Alpha and Omega: Journey to Big Kingdom	Claudette	as Lindsay Torrance	
2018	The Son of Bigfoot	Shelly		
2024	Big City Greens the Movie: Spacecation	Tilly Green		

=== Video games ===
Year	Title	Role	Notes	Source
2009	Aion: The Tower of Eternity			
2010	Heroes of Newerth	URSA Devo, Sexy Librarian, Malice		
2010	Dance Central	Miss Aubrey		
2011	Dance Central 2	Miss Aubrey		
2012	Dance Central 3	Miss Aubrey		
2014	Danganronpa: Trigger Happy Havoc	Celestia Ludenberg		
2014	Atelier Escha & Logy: Alchemists of the Dusk Sky	Escha Malier	Co-protagonist	
2014	Revolution 60	Amelia Melpomene		
2014	Power Rangers: Super Megaforce	Super Megaforce Yellow, Mighty Morphin Pink		
2015	Atelier Shallie: Alchemists of the Dusk Sea	Escha Malier	Also in Shallie Plus/DX	
2016	Final Fantasy XV	Y'jhimei	Credited as Marieve Harrington	
2018	Them's Fightin' Herds	Paprika		

=== Live-action ===
Year	Title	Role	Notes	Source
2000	In a Heartbeat	Alice	Ep. "Friends Don't Let Friends..."	
2001	The Famous Jett Jackson	Erin	Ep. "Hotline"	
2009	General Hospital	Pregnant Woman	Ep. 11916	
2009–11	How I Met Your Mother	Betty	Eps. "The Window", "Jenkins", "Canning Randy" and "Legendaddy"	
2012	The New Normal	Heather	Ep. "Pilot"	
2012	Modern Family	Chimney Sweep's Mom	Ep. "Open House of Horrors"	
2013	Good Luck Charlie	Winnie	Eps. "Doppel Date", "Teddy's Choice" and "Sister, Sister"	
2013	Graceland	Waitress	Ep. "Pilot"	
2014	Baby Daddy	Ticket Taker	Ep. "Livin' on a Prom"	
2015	Dog with a Blog	Gracie	Voice	

== Discography ==
- Blossoming (Timely Manor, 2006)
- Midnight Sessions (2010)
