= Rob Hardy =

American film director

- Born: Philadelphia, Pennsylvania, U.S.
- Education: George School
- Alma mater: Florida A&M University
- Occupations: Filmmaker, businessman
- Spouse: Shaun Hardy

Robert Hardy, Jr. is a film director, film producer, screenwriter, and television director.

With partner Will Packer, he founded the production company Rainforest Films in 1994. Hardy's film credits include The Gospel, Trois, and Trois 2: Pandora's Box. His television credits include ER, Criminal Minds, Arrow, and The Game.

== Film career ==
Hardy shot his first substantive video on camcorder, G-Man, while a high school senior at the George School. He shot his first work on film, Chocolate City, while at Florida A&M University, for which he earned the university's Bernard Hendricks Student Leadership Award. The success of Chocolate City helped Hardy and his film partner Will Packer launch Rainforest Films. Hardy's next film, the erotic thriller Trois, saw him as director, co-writer, and self-distributor. Trois became the fastest Independent African-American film to pass the US$1 million mark. A critically acclaimed sequel, Trois 2: Pandora's Box, followed. In 2003, Hardy produced his first film, Motives, followed by the third in the Trois franchise, the direct-to-video Trois: The Escort.

Hardy then wrote and directed the spiritually-themed drama The Gospel, and produced the companion concert film The Gospel Live. He then was the executive producer on Mekhi Phifer's directorial film debut Puff, Puff, Pass, followed by Stomp The Yard, which held the No. 1 position at the box office for two weekends in January 2007 and was named Best Movie at the 2007 BET Hip Hop Awards. Subsequent projects included Stomp The Yard: Homecoming and Think Like a Man.

Hardy and Packer mutually dissolved Rainforest Films in June 2014. They were subsequently sued by business partner Bernard Bronner for mismanagement and misappropriation of corporate assets.

In March 2015, Hardy launched Rainforest Entertainment. He announced that the new production company would focus on developing scripted and non-scripted content for film, television and digital platforms. Hardy hired Mitzi Miller to serve as Head of Development for the film, television and digital media production company and her offices will be based in Los Angeles.

== Television career ==
Since his 2008 dive into TV directing with ER, Hardy has worked on a variety of hit TV shows like Bones, Criminal Minds, The Vampire Diaries, 90210, The Game and The Flash and has begun directing commercial projects for clients, including CNN, TBS, American Honda, Coca-Cola, Georgia Lottery and The National Cancer Institute.

Along with Andrew Young, Martin Luther King III, and Rainforest Films partner Will Packer, Hardy is a co-founder of Bounce TV, a United States television network airing on digital terrestrial television stations. Promoted as "the first 24/7 digital multicast broadcast network created exclusively for African Americans," Bounce TV launched on September 26, 2011, and features programming geared toward blacks and African Americans in the 25–54 age range.

Hardy was nominated on January 9, 2014, for the 45th NAACP Image Awards for Outstanding Directing in a Dramatic Series for his work on Criminal Minds. More recently, he signed a deal with Lionsgate.

== Personal life ==
Hardy grew up in Philadelphia, Pennsylvania. He graduated from George School in 1991.

Hardy resides in Atlanta, Georgia with his wife, Shaun, and their sons. Hardy dedicated his 2000 film Trois to his father, Robert, an investor in the movie and Rainforest Films, who died on Labor Day 1999 before the completion of the film. Hardy is a graduate of Florida A&M University and is a member of Alpha Phi Alpha fraternity. Hardy has completed studies at the New York Film Academy and has earned many nominations and accolades, including the Bernard Hendricks Student Leadership Award from FAMU, which is the highest honor bestowed on a student; the Meritorious Achievement Award from FAMU, which is the highest honor bestowed on an alumnus and the inaugural Woody Strode/Paul Robeson Award of Excellence from his fraternity, Alpha Phi Alpha.

== Filmography ==
=== Film ===
Year	Title	Director	Writer
1994	Chocolate City	Yes	Yes
2000	Trois	Yes	Yes
2002	Trois 2: Pandora's Box	Yes	Yes
2005	The Gospel	Yes	Yes
2010	Stomp The Yard: Homecoming	Yes	No

Producer

- Chocolate City (1994)
- Motives (2004)
- The Gospel Live (2005)
- Motives 2 (2007)
- Three Can Play That Game (2008)

Executive producer

- Trois: The Escort (2004) (Also cameo appearance)
- Puff, Puff, Pass (2006)
- Stomp the Yard (2007)
- Think Like a Man (2012)
- No Good Deed (2014)
- Think Like a Man Too (2014)

=== Television ===
- ER
  "Believe the Unseen" (2008)
- Heroes
  "The Recruit" (webisode) (2008)
- Criminal Minds
  "The Big Wheel" (2009)
  "Solitary Man" (2010)
  "Coda" (2011)
  "The Bittersweet Science" (2011)
  "The Wheels on the Bus..." (2012)
  "Carbon Copy" (2013)
  "What Happens in Mecklinburg..." (2014)
- The Vampire Diaries
  "Memory Lane" (2010)
  "Smells Like Teen Spirit" (2011)
  "Memorial" (2012)
  "Dead Man on Campus" (2013)
  "An Eternity of Misery" (2016)
- 90210
  "They're Playing Her Song" (2010)
  "Greek Tragedy" (2011)
  "A Tale of Two Parties" (2012)
- Bones
  "The Sin in the Sisterhood" (2011)
  "The Corpse on the Canopy" (2013)
  "The Carrot in the Kudzu" (2014)
- Criminal Minds: Suspect Behavior
  "Jane" (2011)
- Single Ladies
  "Confidence Games" (2011)
  "That's What Friends Are For" (2011)
- Alpha Man: The Brotherhood Of MLK (documentary) (2011) (executive producer; director)
- The Game
  "A Punch in the Gut..." (2012)
  "Higher Ground" (2012)
  "There's No Place Like Home" (2012)
  "Derwin's About To Go Ham!" (2012)
- Uptown Comic (executive producer)
  "Episode 1.3" (2012)
  "Episode 1.9" (2012)
- Second Generation Wayans
  "The Arrival" (2013)
- Grey's Anatomy
  "Walking on a Dream" (2013)
  "How to Save a Life" (2015)
- Cult
  "Get with the Program" (2013)
- Castle
  "The Wild Rover" (2013)
- Ravenswood
  "Death and the Maiden" (2013)
- Arrow
  "Blast Radius" (2014)
  "Draw Back Your Bow" (2014)
  "Eleven-Fifty-Nine" (2016)
- The Originals
  "Dance Back from the Grave" (2014)
  "Gonna Set Your Flag on Fire" (2015)
- Finding Carter
  "Drive" (2014)
  "Now You See Me" (2014)
- The Flash
  "Crazy for You" (2015)
  "Potential Energy" (2016)
  "Untouchable" (2017)
- Empire
  "Sins of the Father" (2015)
- Being Mary Jane
  "Line in the Sand" (2015)
  "Primetime" (2015)
- Power
  "Three Moves Ahead" (2015)
  "Don't Go" (2016)
  "You Can't Fix This" (2017)
  "The Devil Inside" (2018)
- How To Get Away With Murder
  "She's Dying" (2015)
  "Live. Live. Live." (2017)
- Satisfaction
  "...Through Struggle" (2015)
- Blindspot
  "Cede Your Soul" (2015)
  "We Fight Deaths on Thick Lone Water" (2016)
- Black-ish
  "Johnson & Johnson" (2016)
- Shameless
  "Swipe, Fuck, Leave" (2016)
- The Quad (executive producer)
  "The Quad: The Movie" (2017)
  "Elevator" (2017)
- Kevin (Probably) Saves the World
  "Brutal Acts of Kindness" (2017)
- Step Up: High Water
  "Episode 3" (2018)
- Deception
  "Sacrifice 99 to Fool One" (2018)
- All American
  "Pilot" (2018)
  "i" (2018)
  "Homecoming" (2018)
  "Hustle & Motivate" (2019)
- Black Lightning
  "The Book of Secrets Chapter One: Prodigal Son" (2019)
- Doom Patrol
  "Therapy Patrol" (2019)
- Prodigal Son
  "Family Friend" (2019)
- Runaways
  "Enter The Dreamland" (2019)
- Evil
  "Justice x 2" (2020)
- Stargirl
  "Wildcat" (2020)
- Power Book III: Raising Kanan
  "Back in the Day" (2021)
  "Paid in Full" (2021)
  "If Y'Don't Know, Now You Know" (2022)
  "Home Sweet Home" (2023)
  "Gimme the Weight" (2025)
  "Unconditional Love" (2026)
- Power Book II: Ghost
  "Heart of Darkness" (2021)
  "Free Will is Never Free" (2021)
  "Love and War" (2022)
  "No More Second Chances" (2023)
- Power Book IV: Force
  "He Ain't Heavy" (2022)
  "Tommy's Back" (2023)
- Elsbeth
  "Ball Girl" (2024)
  "I See... Murder" (2025)
  "Glamazons" (2025)
  "All About Eats" (2026)
- Reasonable Doubt
  "This Can't Be Life" (2024)
- Found
  "Missing While Outed" (2025)
- The Hunting Party
  "Mark Marsden" (2025)
- Cupertino
  "Yungwood" (2026)
