= Bronner Bros. =

American hair and skin care company

- Company type: Private
- Founded: 1947
- Headquarters: Austell, Georgia 30336 revenue = ▲US$38 million (2004)
- Products: African American hair and skin care products
- Number of employees: 300
- Website: www.bronnerbros.com

The Bronner Bros. Enterprise is one of the largest private African American hair and skin care producers in the United States. Founded in 1947 by brothers Dr. Nathaniel H. Bronner, Sr. and Arthur E. Bronner, Sr., Bronner Bros. has over 300 full-time and part-time staff members. The company headquarters is located in Atlanta, Georgia.

== History ==
Behind the scenes at one of the Bronner Bros. trade shows

Nathaniel and Arthur Bronner, with the help of their sister, Emma Bronner, started Bronner Bros. in 1947 as a way to teach cosmetology at the local YMCA. About 300 people attended the first show but as the attendance grew, it was moved to the Royal Peacock Social Club and then to the Auburn Avenue Casino. In 1967, Bronner Bros. signed a contract with the new Hyatt Regency Hotel and the show was held there annually for the next 20 years. Through the years, the Bronners secured a number of popular guest speakers, including Martin Luther King Jr., Jackie Robinson, Dick Gregory and Benjamin Mays.

With Nathaniel Bronner, Sr's death in 1993, Bernard Bronner took over the company as president and CEO and the trade show has continued to grow by leaps and bounds. In 1996, all Bronner Bros. delegates traveled to Orlando, Florida for a large conference. The annual trade show is now held in the prestigious Georgia World Congress Center. As of 2015, the Bronner Bros. International Beauty Show was the largest gathering of multicultural beauty professionals in the U.S., pulling in 22,000 attendees and 300 exhibitors.

More and more Bronner family members are getting involved in the company. There were two brothers in the first generation of the business, six brothers in the second generation, and the third generation now has 30 members.

Bernard Bronner was also a partner in Rainforest Films, which produced films targeting an urban audience and featuring African-American talent, until the company was formally dissolved in 2014. Rainforest's filmography includes Stomp the Yard, The Gospel, Pandora's Box, This Christmas, and Takers.

== Bronner Bros. products ==
Pump It Up is just one of the products made by Bronner Bros.

Bronner Bros. products are created primarily for the African-American population but the products can be used on all types of hair. Their main product lines include African Royale, BB, Tropical Roots and they also have an All Natural Product line. Bronner Bros. owns and operates two manufacturing facilities, a shipping facility, two beauty stores, a hair weaving studio and a Public Relations office.

== Christian organizations ==
The Word of Faith Family Worship Cathedral

Bronner Bros. has not been quiet when it comes to the company's Christian beliefs. One of their most successful organizations is The Word of Faith Family Worship Cathedral in Austell, Georgia, founded by Bishop Dale C. Bronner the son of Nathaniel Bronner (one of the Bronner Bros. founders). The ministry has more than 19,000 members and over five branch ministries which it has birthed.

Under the motto "Reaching the lost, teaching the found," the center provides a number of ministries, including Christian education, Sunday school classes, singles ministry, marriage ministry, prison ministry and the Bronner Business Institute which provides training for those who want to become entrepreneurs. The ministry currently run a school for infant to preschool children called the Seeds of Excellence Christian Academy in Austell, Georgia, blocks away from the Cathedral. Word of Faith recently built a recreation center called The Family Life Center.

The Bronner family also founded The Ark of Salvation Worship Center in Atlanta, GA, which Rev. Nathaniel Bronner, Jr., Rev. Charles Bronner and Rev. James Bronner (The Brothers of the Word) lead. This ministry produces television broadcasts throughout the week as well as some leading online ministries.

== The Bronner family ==
Bronner Bros. was co-founded by Dr. Nathaniel H. Bronner, Sr. and Arthur E. Bronner, Sr. The business was passed to Nathaniel's six sons upon his passing in 1993. Nathaniel's sons in order of age include:

- Rev. Nathaniel Bronner, Jr.: manufacturing director for Bronner Bros., president of Century Systems Inc. and senior pastor at the Ark of Salvation Church. He and his wife Simone have four children.
- Bernard Bronner: president of Bronner Bros., publisher of Upscale, partner in Rainforest Films, and show & sales director for Bronner Bros. He and his wife Sheila have five children.
- Darrow Bronner: Until his death in 2000, was the show director and professional sales director for Bronner Bros. He had five children with his wife Jane.
- Bishop Dale Bronner: founder and pastor of the Word of Faith Worship Center. He and his wife Nina Bronner have five children.
- Rev. Charles Bronner: purchasing manager for Bronner Bros. and co-pastor at the Ark of Salvation Church. He and his wife have four children.
- Rev. James Bronner: trade show director, director of technology for Bronner Bros, vice president of Century Systems, Inc., and youth pastor at the Ark of Salvation Church. He and his wife Stephanie have seven children and are co-authors of the marriage book Bedroom Talk.

== Awards and honors ==
In 2004, Wal-Mart recognized Bronner Bros. as their top vendor of the year in their annual report. The same year, the largest beauty and barber retailing supplier in the United States, Sally Beauty Supply, also named the company their top vendor of the year.
