= Will Packer =

American film producer (born 1974)

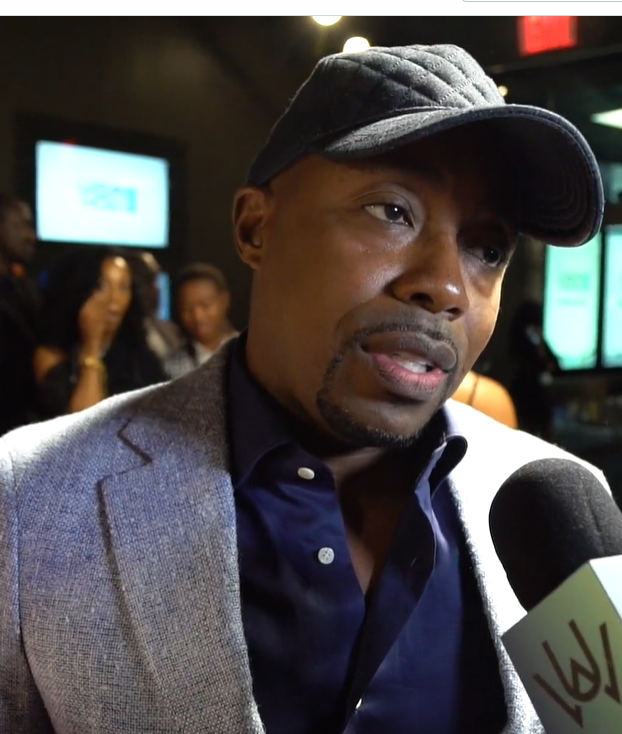
- Packer in 2018
- Born: April 11, 1974 (age 52); St. Petersburg, Florida, U.S.
- Education: Florida A&M University (BS)
- Occupation: Film producer
- Years active: 1994–present
- Notable credits: Think Like a Man; Obsessed; Ride Along; About Last Night; Girls Trip; Night School
- Television: That Girl Lay Lay
- Spouses: Nina Packer (m. 2001; div. 2009) Heather Hayslett (m. 2015)
- Children: 4

William Packer (born April 11, 1974) is an American film producer. He has produced or executive produced films that have grossed more than US$1 billion worldwide at the box office, including 10 films that have opened at number one. He has produced more than 30 features including comedies such as Think Like a Man (2012), Ride Along (2014), Think Like a Man Too (2014), The Wedding Ringer (2015), Girls Trip (2017), Night School (2018), What Men Want (2019) and Little (2019).

Packer produced the 2022 Academy Awards Oscars ceremony. In 2024, he became a limited partner of the NFL's Atlanta Falcons (2024). Packer co-founded Rainforest Films in 1994, and has since founded Will Packer Productions and Will Packer Media.

== Early life and education ==
Packer was born and raised in St. Petersburg, Florida. He graduated from St. Petersburg High School in 1991 and began attending Florida A&M University that fall. In 1996, Packer graduated magna cum laude with a Bachelor of Science degree in electrical engineering. On October 29, 2021, FAMU personally honored Packer by renaming its amphitheater the Will Packer Amphitheater. Packer also received the Meritorious Achievement Award from Florida A&M, the highest honor the university bestows.

== Career ==
=== Rainforest Films ===
It was at FAMU that he started filmmaking with colleague and future business partner Rob Hardy while participating in an internship with veteran producer Warrington Hudlin. In 1994, Packer and Hardy produced their first film, Chocolate City, for $20,000 and Packer helped broker a small distribution deal with Blockbuster video. After graduating, Packer and Hardy moved to Atlanta, Georgia and co-founded Rainforest Films. Packer produced and oversaw the company's studio-financed and self-financed films and distribution projects. Packer and Hardy's vision was to make films that would appeal to black audiences who hadn't seen genre films starring people like themselves.

In 2000, Trois, Rainforest Film's first movie to be released theatrically, grossed over $1.2 million and became the fastest million-dollar grossing film independently distributed by African Americans. Trois was in the Top 50 Highest Grossing Independent Films of the year, according to Daily Variety, and Rainforest Films was at #34 on the list of Top 100 Film Distributors of 2000 listed by The Hollywood Reporter in August 2001. Due to the success of their first film, Packer and Hardy were listed among the "New Establishment" of Black power brokers in Hollywood.

In 2001, Packer helped broker a deal with Sony to produce and distribute urban films including Trois's sequel, Trois: The Escort, and Motives. The film Lockdown, released on home video under this Rainforest-Sony collaboration. In 2005, Rainforest Films released The Gospel. At this time, Packer started using the shortened moniker "Will Packer".

Packer and Hardy wanted Rainforest's films to include established actors and actresses as well as those who are up and coming. 2007's This Christmas, a film about a middle-class family that reunites at Christmas time for the first time in many years, stars veteran actresses Loretta Devine and Regina King as well as R&B superstar Chris Brown in his feature film debut. Packer produced five #1 films with Rainforest, Stomp the Yard, Obsessed, Takers, Think like a Man and Ride Along. His biggest hits with Rainforest have been Think like a Man, which grossed over $96 million worldwide after being released in April 2012, and Ride Along, which brought in box office receipts totaling nearly $150 million as of April 2014.

In television, Packer, along with Andrew Young, Martin Luther King III, and Rainforest Films partner Rob Hardy, are co-founders of Bounce TV, a United States television network airing on digital terrestrial television stations. Promoted as "the first 24/7 digital multicast broadcast network created exclusively for African Americans," Bounce TV launched on September 26, 2011, and features programming geared toward blacks and African Americans in the 25–54 age range.

In June 2014, Packer and Hardy dissolved Rainforest Films. The pair were included in a lawsuit brought by former business partner Bernard Bronner in late June 2014.

=== Will Packer Productions ===
In 2013, Packer launched Will Packer Productions. In July 2013, he signed a two-year deal with Universal Television to develop new projects for the studio. Later that year, he signed a three-year deal with Universal Pictures. Packer-produced films under the Will Packer Productions banner include #1 box office openers Ride Along 2, No Good Deed and Think Like a Man Too along with The Wedding Ringer and Girls Trip. Girls Trip was the highest grossing live action comedy of 2017 and the first film written, directed, produced, and starring African-Americans to gross over $100 million. The film went on to gross $140 million on a $19 million budget. Packer also served as executive producer on NWA biopic Straight Outta Compton and on 2016 television mini-series Roots.

He has produced the comedies Night School (2018), starring Kevin Hart and Tiffany Haddish, What Men Want (2019), starring Taraji P. Henson, and Little (2019), starring Marsai Martin and Regina Hall, The Photograph (2020), starring Issa Rae and LaKeith Stanfield, and Beast (2022), starring Idris Elba. Packer has been included in several high-profile lists, including The Hollywood Reporter's "40(ish) Most Powerful People in Comedy", GIANT magazine's "The GIANT 100", Jet magazine's "Who's Hot To Watch in 2008" and Black Enterprise's "Most Powerful Players Under 40."

=== Will Packer Media ===
In 2017, Packer launched Will Packer Media, a branded content and digital production company, in partnership with Discovery Communications and Universal Pictures. As part of the launch, the company acquired digital ad firm Narrative_ to serve as the new venture's branded content arm, WP Narrative. In 2018, Will Packer Media acquired women's lifestyle site xoNecole.

Will Packer Media produces episodic scripted and unscripted series across television and digital platforms, as well as content for brand clients and short-form digital content for millennial audiences. Current productions include Ready to Love and Put a Ring On It for OWN, and That Girl Lay Lay for Nickelodeon. Will Packer Media also produces scripted and unscripted podcasts with iHeart Media including Fight Night and The Lower Bottoms.

Packer served as the executive producer of the remake of Roots, for which he received an Emmy Award nomination. The company's WP Narrative_ division was a 2018 Webby Award Winner and 10th Annual Shorty Award winner for its work producing video short #TakeAKnee. WP Narrative was also honored for its #BackedByAxe campaign created for Showtime's Billions, winning at the Clio Entertainment awards, 10th Annual Shorty Awards and 2018 D&AD Awards.

Central Ave, an entertainment magazine series, debuted November 4, 2019 on Fox television stations.

=== 2022 Oscar ceremony ===
Packer was named the Producer of the 94th Annual Academy Awards which aired on March 27, 2022. This marked his first "live" television production credit for a major show on a major television network (ABC) and was televised in more than 200 territories worldwide. The 94th Oscars was the highest-rated entertainment special in primetime on any network in two years in both total viewers (16.6 million) and adults 18-49 (3.8/28). Kelly Lawler of USA Today wrote of the ceremony, "It was equal parts boring and terrifying, cringe-worthy and interminable."

==== Controversy ====
The show was overshadowed by Will Smith walking on stage and slapping host Chris Rock after he made a joke about Smith's wife's, Jada Pinkett Smith's, hair. Packer immediately tweeted, "Welp... I said it wouldn't be boring", before deleting the tweet after criticism that he was being smug. He later tweeted that it was "a very painful moment for me". Variety reported that Packer "was the key to Smith remaining in his seat". Academy Board of Governors member Whoopi Goldberg defended Packer's decision to carry on with the show saying, "And the reason they didn't go and take him out is because that would have been another 15-, 20-minute explanation of why we're taking the Black man out five seconds before they're about to decide whether he's won an Oscar or not."

== Personal life ==
Packer is a member of Alpha Phi Alpha fraternity (inducted into the Beta Nu chapter at FAMU). Packer married his first wife Nina Packer (general manager of Bryant Management and Dir. Of Operations for Blueprint Group, the artist management firm for Lil' Wayne and his YMCMB label from 2007 to 2014). The Packer family is made up of Packer's son Dominique, and two daughters, Maya and Nija, from his previous relationship and Zion with Heather Hayslett. They were divorced in February 2009. Packer proposed to his fiancé Heather Hayslett live on stage at the 2013 Essence Music Festival. They were married in August 2015 in Georgia.

== Filmography ==
Producer

- Chocolate City (1994)
- Trois (2000) (also writer)
- Trois 2: Pandora's Box (2002) (also story writer)
- Motives (2004)
- The Gospel (2005)
- Puff, Puff, Pass (2006)
- Stomp the Yard (2007)
- Motives 2 (2007)
- This Christmas (2007)
- Three Can Play That Game (2008)
- Obsessed (2009)
- Takers (2010)
- Stomp the Yard: Homecoming (2010)
- Think Like a Man (2012) (also cameo appearance)
- Ride Along (2014)
- About Last Night (2014)
- Think Like a Man Too (2014) (also cameo appearance)
- No Good Deed (2014)
- The Wedding Ringer (2015)
- Ride Along 2 (2016)
- Almost Christmas (2016)
- Girls Trip (2017)
- Breaking In (2018)
- Night School (2018)
- What Men Want (2019)
- Little (2019)
- Jacob's Ladder (2019)
- The Photograph (2020)
- That Girl Lay Lay (2021)
- Beast (2022)
- 94th Academy Awards (2022)
- Praise This (2023)
- Oracle (2023)
- Dashing Through the Snow (2023)
- Fight Night: The Million Dollar Heist (2024)
- You, Me & Tuscany (2026)
- 72 Hours (2026)
- Ride Along 3 (TBA)

Executive producer

- Trois: The Escort (2004)
- The Gospel Live (2005)
- Alpha Man: The Brotherhood of MLK (2011)
- Battle of the Year (2013)
- Straight Outta Compton (2015)
- Truth Be Told (2015)
- Roots (2016)
- Uncle Buck (2016)
- Being Mary Jane (2017–2019)
- The Quad (2017–2018)
- Ready to Love (2018)
- Put a Ring on It (2019)
- Ambitions (2019)
- The Atlanta Child Murders (2019)
- The Disappearance of the Millbrook Twins (2019)
- Bigger (2019–2021)
- The Return (2022)

== Awards and nominations ==
Award	Year	Category	Work	Result	Ref.
BET Awards	2013	Best Movie	Think Like A Man	Won	
Black Film Critics Circle Award	2012	Pioneer Award	Himself	Won	
Florida Film Critics Circle	2001	Golden Orange Award	Trois	Won	
Black Reel Award	2018	Best Film/Outstanding Motion Picture	Girls Trip	Nominated	
Black Reel Award	2005	Best Independent Film	Motives	Nominated	
Black Reel Award for Television	2024	Outstanding TV Movie/Limited Series	Praise This	Won	
Critics' Choice Real TV Awards	2020	Best Sports Show	Blackballed	Nominated	
HBCU Honor Awards	2024	Industry Impact Award	Himself	Won	
NAACP Image Awards	2026	Outstanding Literary Work – Instructional	Who Better Than You?	Won	
NAACP Image Awards	2026	Outstanding Reality Program/Reality Competition Series/Game Show	Ready to Love	Nominated	
NAACP Image Awards	2025	Outstanding Television (Series, Special, or Movie)	Fight Night: The Million Dollar Heist	Won	
NAACP Image Awards	2018	Outstanding Motion Picture	Girls Trip	Won	
Primetime Emmy Awards	2022	Outstanding Variety Special (Live)	The Oscars	Nominated	
Primetime Emmy Awards	2016	Outstanding Limited Series	Roots	Nominated	
Voice Arts Award	2026	Outstanding Audiobook Narration – Self-Help, Health & Wellness – Best Voiceover	Who Better Than You?	Won	
