= The Gospel Live =

- Directed by: Chet A. Brewster
- Produced by: Will Packer (executive producer); Rob Hardy (executive producer)
- Starring: Anthony Anderson; CeCe Winans; Deitrick Haddon; Mary Mary; Kelly Price; Jared Sawyer Jr; Kierra "Kiki" Sheard; Hezekiah Walker; Martha Munizzi; Keith Wilson's Choir; Micah Stampley
- Distributed by: Rainforest Films; Sony Pictures Home Entertainment
- Release date: December 26, 2005
- Running time: 73 mins
- Country: United States
- Language: English

The Gospel Live is a contemporary gospel concert film produced by Rainforest Films as a companion to the movie The Gospel. Hosted by Anthony Anderson, the concert was filmed live at The Rialto Theater in Atlanta, Georgia and features musical performances by Deitrick Haddon, Mary Mary, Kelly Price, Kierra "Kiki" Sheard and Hezekiah Walker. The DVD also includes artist being interviewed by CeCe Winans and a peek backstage at the premiere of the motion picture The Gospel, including celebrity interviews with Clifton Powell and American Idol star Tamyra Gray. It was released direct-to-video on December 26, 2005.
