= Jenifer Lewis =

American actress (born 1957)

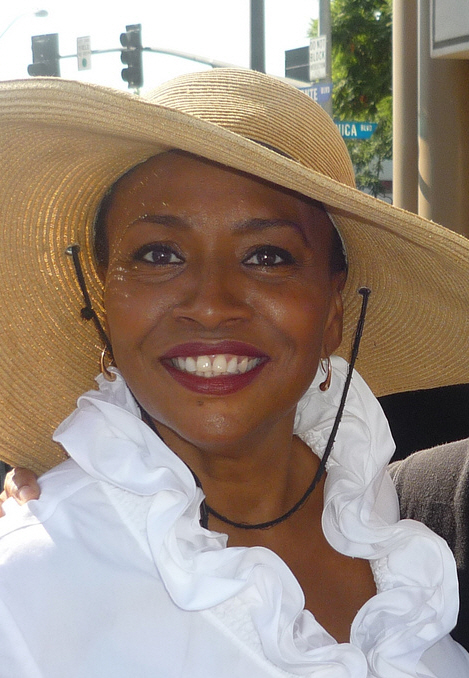
- Lewis in 2008
- Born: Jenifer Jeanette Lewis; January 25, 1957 (age 69); Kinloch, Missouri, U.S.
- Education: Webster University (BFA)
- Occupation: Actress
- Years active: 1979–present
- Children: 1

Jenifer Jeanette Lewis (born January 25, 1957) is an American actress. She began her career by appearing in Broadway musicals and worked as a backup singer for Bette Midler before appearing in films Beaches (1988) and Sister Act (1992). Lewis is known for playing roles of mothers in the films What's Love Got to Do With It (1993), Poetic Justice (1993), The Preacher's Wife (1996), The Brothers (2001), The Cookout (2004), and Think Like a Man (2012) as well as in the sequel Think Like a Man Too (2014), Baggage Claim (2013), The Wedding Ringer (2015), and The Temptations miniseries (1998).

Lewis is known unofficially as "The Mother of Black Hollywood" (also the name of her memoir) given her frequent matriarchal film and television roles. She also provided the voice for Mama Odie in Disney's animated feature The Princess and the Frog (2009), and Flo in Pixar's Cars series. Additional film roles include Dead Presidents (1995), Cast Away (2000) and Hereafter (2010).

On television, Lewis starred as Lana Hawkins in the Lifetime medical drama Strong Medicine from 2000 to 2006. She also had recurring roles on sitcoms A Different World, The Fresh Prince of Bel-Air, and Girlfriends. In 2014, Lewis began starring as Ruby Johnson in the ABC comedy series Black-ish, for which she received two Critics' Choice Television Award nominations.

== Early life ==
Lewis was born in Kinloch, Missouri. She received an honorary Doctor of Humane Letters degree from Webster University in 2015.

== Career ==
=== 1970s–1980s ===
Soon after she arrived in New York City, Lewis debuted on Broadway in a small role in Eubie (1979), a musical based on the work of Eubie Blake. She next landed the role of Effie White in the workshop of the Michael Bennett–directed musical Dreamgirls, but when the show moved to Broadway, Bennett chose Jennifer Holliday for the role.

Lewis became a Harlette, a backup singer for Bette Midler, which led to her first TV appearances on Midler's HBO specials. She was cast as a backup singer in the Otto Titsling production number in Midler's film Beaches (1988). At the same time, Lewis was developing her nightclub act, The Diva Is Dismissed, an autobiographical comedy and music show in New York City cabarets. She performed the show off-Broadway at the Public Theater.

=== 1990s ===
After Lewis relocated to Los Angeles, she began appearing in television sitcoms, including Murphy Brown, Dream On, In Living Color, Roc, Hangin' with Mr. Cooper, and Friends. From 1992 to 1993, she played Dean Davenport in the sixth and final season of the NBC sitcom A Different World. She also had a recurring role as Will Smith's Aunt Helen in NBC sitcom The Fresh Prince of Bel-Air from 1991 to 1996. As a series regular, Lewis starred alongside Patricia Wettig in her short-lived legal drama Courthouse in 1995, playing Judge Rosetta Reide, the first main African American lesbian character on television.

In 1992, Lewis was cast as one of the backup singers to Whoopi Goldberg in the comedy film Sister Act. The following year, Lewis played the mother of Tupac Shakur's character in the film Poetic Justice, and Zelma Bullock, Tina Turner's mother, in the biopic What's Love Got to Do With It, starring Angela Bassett. Lewis has stated that she never auditioned to play Turner but would have been thrilled to play the iconic singer. Lewis is only one year older than Bassett. For her performance, she received her first NAACP Image Award for Outstanding Supporting Actress in a Motion Picture nomination. In 1994, she followed with other comedic supporting roles, including Mrs. Coleman, the Unemployment Office lady in Renaissance Man and as Whoopi Goldberg's sister in Corrina, Corrina. In 1995, she was cast in maternal roles to Kadeem Hardison in Panther and to Larenz Tate in Dead Presidents.

In 1996, Lewis appeared as Theresa Randle's telephone sex line boss in the film Girl 6. Later that year, she played Whitney Houston's character's mother in the film The Preacher's Wife, for which she received her second NAACP Image Award nomination. She also had roles in The Mighty (1998), The Temptations miniseries (1998), Mystery Men (1999), and Blast from the Past (1999), as well as the leading role in the film Jackie's Back (1999).

=== 2000s ===
In 2000, Lewis had a supporting role in the adventure drama film Cast Away, directed by Robert Zemeckis. In the same year, she began starring as Lana Hawkins on the Lifetime television medical drama Strong Medicine, for which she also performed the theme song. The show ended in February 2006. She voiced Flo in Pixar's Cars franchise and had a recurring role as Veretta Childs (Toni's mother) in UPN sitcom Girlfriends. In film, she appeared as Morris Chestnut's mother in the romantic comedy The Brothers (2001). In 2006, she had a featured role as the wedding planner in Tyler Perry's Madea's Family Reunion and also appeared in Perry's comedy-drama Meet the Browns (2008) as Vera Brown. She also appeared in Juwanna Mann (2002), The Cookout (2004), Nora's Hair Salon (2004), Dirty Laundry (2006), and Not Easily Broken (2009).

On April 22, 2008, Lewis replaced Darlene Love as Motormouth Maybelle in Broadway's Hairspray. On television, she guest-starred on That's So Raven and Boston Legal. Lewis also had a number of voice acting roles, including Walt Disney Animation Studios's animated musical The Princess and the Frog (2009), for which she was nominated for the Annie Award for Voice Acting in a Feature Production.

=== 2010s ===
In June 2010, Lewis told the Jazz Joy and Roy syndicated radio show: "I just did a production of Hello Dolly at the 5th Avenue Theatre in Seattle and it had to be one of the greatest productions that I have ever done, because I got to just do a character, Dolly Levi, and it was just great." In 2012, Lewis began working with Shangela on the online reality show parody Jenifer Lewis and Shangela, where she acts as herself alongside Shangela, a "drag queen living in her basement." She later appeared in Shangela's music video for "Werqin Girl (Professional)".

In 2010, Clint Eastwood cast Lewis in his fantasy film Hereafter. The following year, she starred alongside Rosario Dawson and Tracee Ellis Ross in Five, for which she received her third NAACP Image Award nomination. She also co-starred in the short-lived NBC series The Playboy Club. She played Terrence J's overbearing mother in box-office hit Think Like a Man (2012) and its sequel Think Like a Man Too (2014). In 2013, she played Paula Patton's mother in the romantic comedy Baggage Claim. In 2015, she starred in the romantic comedy The Wedding Ringer.

In 2014, Lewis was cast as Ruby Johnson, Anthony Anderson's character's mother in the ABC comedy series Black-ish. She was elevated to series regular status as of the second season. In 2016, she received Critics' Choice Television Award for Best Guest Performer in a Comedy Series nomination for her performance. She has also been featured in various TV commercials.

In 2017, she published a book about her life and career, entitled The Mother of Black Hollywood, in which she shared her life experiences with Whoopi Goldberg, Loretta Devine, Chris Rock, Bette Midler, Rosie O'Donnell, Liza Minnelli, Whitney Houston and Aretha Franklin.

=== 2020s ===
In 2022, Lewis was honored with a star in the Hollywood Walk of Fame.

In 2024, Lewis competed in season eleven of The Masked Singer as "Miss Cleocatra" who later utilized an Egyptian throne prop. She was eliminated on "Girl Group Night".

Also in 2024, ABC special After the Fall: A Conversation with Robin Roberts and Jenifer Lewis premiered detailing a life-threatening accident that happened while she was on vacation in Africa.

In 2024, Lewis was honored with a star on the St. Louis Walk of Fame.

== Personal life ==
Lewis has revealed that she's been engaged four times but never married. She has an adopted daughter named Charmaine Lewis.

In 2015, Lewis was defrauded by a romance-scheme con man, which was detailed in the 2022 episode "Financial Infidelity" of the series American Greed.

In 1990, Lewis was diagnosed with bipolar disorder. She originally hid her diagnosis, as she felt ashamed, but eventually came to embrace it after 17 years of therapy and 10 years of medication. In a 2014 interview, she said: "You have to look in the mirror... and say—before you can go or grow into anything—you have to say you love yourself."

In 2022, Lewis sustained life-threatening injuries after falling ten feet from her hotel balcony in Serengeti. She was airlifted to Nairobi, where she underwent a nine-hour surgery followed by a six-day ICU stay.

In April 2024, Lewis made remarks about the President of the United States, Donald Trump, comparing him to Adolf Hitler.

Lewis is distantly related to former NFL player Tre'Von Johnson.

== Filmography ==
=== Film ===
Key
| † | Denotes films that have not yet been released |

| Year | Title | Role | Notes |
|---|---|---|---|
| 1988 | Red Heat | Judge Jenifer Lewis | Uncredited |
| 1988 | Beaches | Diva | |
| 1992 | Sister Act | Michelle | |
| 1992 | Frozen Assets | Jomisha | |
| 1993 | What's Love Got to Do With It | Zelma Bullock | Nominated — NAACP Image Award for Outstanding Supporting Actress in a Motion Picture |
| 1993 | Poetic Justice | Anne | |
| 1993 | The Meteor Man | Mrs. Williams | |
| 1993 | Undercover Blues | Cab Driver | |
| 1993 | Sister Act 2: Back in the Habit | Michelle | |
| 1994 | Renaissance Man | Mrs. Coleman | |
| 1994 | Corrina, Corrina | Jevina Washington | |
| 1995 | Panther | Rita | |
| 1995 | Dead Presidents | Mrs. Curtis | |
| 1996 | Girl 6 | Boss #1 — Lil | |
| 1996 | The Preacher's Wife | Marguerite Coleman | Nominated — NAACP Image Award for Outstanding Supporting Actress in a Motion Picture |
| 1998 | The Mighty | Mrs. Addison | |
| 1999 | Blast from the Past | Dr. Nina Aron | |
| 1999 | Get Bruce | Herself | Documentary |
| 1999 | Mystery Men | Lucille | |
| 2000 | Dancing in September | Judge Warner | |
| 2000 | Cast Away | Becca Twig | |
| 2001 | The Brothers | Louise Smith | |
| 2002 | Juwanna Mann | Aunt Ruby | |
| 2002 | Antwone Fisher | Aunt Mary Williams | Uncredited |
| 2004 | Nora's Hair Salon | Nora Harper | |
| 2004 | The Cookout | Emma "Lady Em" Andersen | |
| 2004 | Shark Tale | Motown Turtle (voice) | |
| 2006 | Tyler Perry's Madea's Family Reunion | Milay Jenay Lori | |
| 2006 | Cars | Flo (voice) | |
| 2006 | Dirty Laundry | Aunt Lettuce | |
| 2006 | The Heart Specialist | Nurse Jackson | |
| 2007 | Who's Your Caddy? | Mrs. Hawkins | |
| 2007 | Redrum | Therapist | |
| 2008 | Tyler Perry's Meet the Browns | Vera Brown | |
| 2009 | Not Easily Broken | Mary "Mama" Clark | |
| 2009 | The Princess and the Frog | Mama Odie (voice) | Nominated — Annie Award for Voice Acting in a Feature Production |
| 2010 | Hereafter | Candace | |
| 2011 | Cars 2 | Flo (voice) | |
| 2012 | Think Like a Man | Loretta Hanover | |
| 2012 | Zambezia | Gogo (voice) | |
| 2013 | Playin' for Love | Alize Gates | |
| 2013 | Baggage Claim | Catherine Moore | Nominated — Acapulco Black Film Festival Award for Best Ensemble Cast |
| 2014 | Secrets of the Magic City | Aunt Valerie | |
| 2014 | Think Like a Man Too | Loretta Hanover | |
| 2015 | The Wedding Ringer | Doris Jenkins | |
| 2017 | Cars 3 | Flo (voice) | Nominated — Black Reel Award for Outstanding Voice Performance |
| 2019 | The Addams Family | Great Auntie Sloom (voice) | |
| 2020 | Christmas on the Square | Margeline | |
| 2024 | This Is Me... Now: A Love Story | Gemini | |
| 2024 | Spellbound | Minister Nazara Prone (voice) | |
| 2026 | Goat | Florence “Flo” Everson (voice) | |
| TBA | Women Like Us † | TBA | Pre-production |

=== Television ===
| Year | Title | Role | Notes |
|---|---|---|---|
| 1990–91 | Murphy Brown | Sales Person | Episodes: "Jingle Hell, Jingle Hell, Jingle All the Way" and "Uh-Oh: Part 2" |
| 1990–93 | A Different World | Susan Clayton / Dean Dorothy Dandridge Davenport | Recurring role |
| 1991 | Stat | Felicia Brown | Episode: "Psychosomatic" |
| 1991 | Sunday in Paris | Taylor Chase | Pilot |
| 1991–96 | The Fresh Prince of Bel-Air | Aunt Helen Smith | Recurring role |
| 1992 | Dream On | Carolyn | Episode: "To the Moon, Alex!" |
| 1993 | In Living Color | Various characters | Recurring role |
| 1993 | Roc | Charlaine | Episode: "Joey the Bartender" |
| 1993 | Moon Over Miami | Aurora Tyler | Episode: "If You Only Knew" |
| 1993–95 | Hangin' With Mr. Cooper | Georgia Rodman | Episodes: "Father Fairest", "Double Cheeseburger, Hold the Diploma" and "Here Comes the Groom" |
| 1994 | Lois & Clark: The New Adventures of Superman | Mystique | Episode: "All Shook Up" |
| 1994 | Friends | Paula | Episode: "The One With the Thumb" |
| 1994 | Deconstructing Sarah | Betty | Television film |
| 1994 | Shake, Rattle and Rock! | Amanda | Television film |
| 1994 | Last Days of Russell | Aunt Yvette | Television film |
| 1995 | New York Undercover | Medina | Episode: "Private Enemy No. 1" |
| 1995 | Living Single | Delia Deveaux | Episode: "Talk Showdown" |
| 1995 | Courthouse | Judge Rosetta Reide | Main role |
| 1996 | Cosby | Bernice | Episode: "Basketball Story" |
| 1997 | Touched by an Angel | Queenie | Episode: "Amazing Grace: Part 1" |
| 1997 | Promised Land | Queenie | Episode: "Amazing Grace: Part 2" |
| 1997–99 | Happily Ever After: Fairy Tales for Every Child | Black Widow Spider / Hazel (voice) | Episodes: "Goldilocks and the Three Bears" and "The Bremen Town Musicians" |
| 1998 | The Parent 'Hood | Linda | Episode: "Hurricane Linda" |
| 1998 | The Temptations | Mama Rose Franklin | Television film |
| 1998 | An Unexpected Life | Camille | Television film |
| 1998–2000 | For Your Love | Sylvia Ellis | Episodes: "The Brother's Day" and "The Father Fixture" |
| 1999 | The Jamie Foxx Show | Josie | Episode: "Always Follow Your Heart" |
| 1999 | Moesha | Mrs. Biggs | Episode: "A Den Is a Terrible Thing to Waste" |
| 1999 | Grown Ups | Melissa's mother | Episode: "Family Circus" |
| 1999 | Time of Your Life | Joss's mother | Episode: "The Time They Had Not" |
| 1999 | Jackie's Back | Jackie Washington | Television film Nominated — Black Reel Award for Best Actress |
| 1999–2001 | The PJs | Bebe Ho (voice) | Main role |
| 2000 | Bette | Inez | Episode: "The Grammy Pre-Show" |
| 2000 | Little Richard | Muh Penniman | Television film |
| 2000 | Partners | Detective Lancy | Television film |
| 2000–06 | Strong Medicine | Receptionist Lana Hawkins | Main role Nominated – NAMIC Vision Awards for Best Performance – Drama (2006) |
| 2001 | The Ponder Heart | Narcissa Wingfield | Television film |
| 2002 | Family Affair | Mrs. Summers | Episode: "Pilot: Part 1" |
| 2002–06 | Girlfriends | Veretta Childs | Recurring role |
| 2003 | The Proud Family | Aunt Spice (voice) | Episode: "Penny Potter" |
| 2004 | That's So Raven | Vivian Baxter | Episode: "To See or Not to See" |
| 2007 | Day Break | Elizabeth Hopper | Episode: "What If She's Lying?" |
| 2007 | Shark | Ellie Broussard | Episode: "Backfire" |
| 2007–08 | Boston Legal | Judge Isabel Fisher | Episodes: "No Brains Left Behind" and "Mad About You" |
| 2009–10 | Meet the Browns | Vera Brown | Recurring role |
| 2011 | The Cleveland Show | Various voices | Episodes: "A Short Story and a Tall Tale" and "The Way the Cookie Crumbles" |
| 2011 | American Dad! | Lessie (voice) | Episode: "School Lies" |
| 2011 | State of Georgia | Patrice | Episode: "Best Friends For-Never" |
| 2011 | The Playboy Club | Pearl | Main role |
| 2011 | Five | Maggie | Television film Nominated — Black Reel Award for Best Actress in a Television Miniseries or Movie; Nominated — NAACP Image Award for Outstanding Actress in a Television Movie, Mini-Series or Dramatic Special; Nominated – NAMIC Vision Awards for Best Performance – Drama |
| 2014 | The Boondocks | Boss Willona / Geraldine (voice) | Episodes: "Breaking Grandad" and "Early Bird Special" |
| 2014–22 | Black-ish | Ruby Johnson | Recurring (Season 1), Main role (Season 2–8); Black Reel Award for Outstanding Supporting Actress in a Comedy Series (2017–19); Nominated – Critics' Choice Television Award for Best Guest Performer in a Comedy Series (2016); Nominated – Critics' Choice Television Award for Best Supporting Actress in a Comedy Series (2017); Nominated – Screen Actors Guild Award for Outstanding Performance by an Ensemble in a Comedy Series (2017–18) |
| 2015 | The Exes | Caren Dupree | Episode: "Requiem for a Dream" |
| 2015 | Instant Mom | Delois | Episodes: "Not Full House" and "Mysteries of Maggie" |
| 2015 | It Had to Be You | Reggie | Television film |
| 2017–21 | Big Hero 6: The Series | Professor Granville, additional voices | Main role |
| 2018 | Young Justice | Olympia Savage (voice) | Episode: "Evolution" |
| 2018 | RuPaul's Drag Race All Stars | Guest Judge | Episode: "All Star Super Queen Variety Show" |
| 2019 | Elena of Avalor | Tornado (voice) | Episodes: "Luna's Big Leap" and "King Skylar" |
| 2019–22 | Tuca & Bertie | Aunt Tallulah Toucan (voice) | Episodes: "Plumage", "Yeast Week", "Nighttime Friend" and "The Pain Garden" |
| 2020 | Amphibia | Mama Hasselback (voice) | Episode: "The Ballad of Hopediah Planter" |
| 2020 | Twenties | Herself | Episode: "Redemption Song" |
| 2021 | Star Trek: Lower Decks | Bartender (voice) | Episode: "An Embarrassment of Dooplers" |
| 2021–22 | Rugrats | Ms. Marjorie (voice) | Episodes: "Escape from Preschool/Mr. Chuckie" and "Lucky Smudge/Our Friend Twinkle" |
| 2021–24 | The Ghost and Molly McGee | Patty (voice) | Recurring role |
| 2021–25 | Mickey Mouse Funhouse | Wheezelene (voice) | Recurring role |
| 2022 | Grown-ish | Ruby Johnson | Episodes: "It Was Good Until It Wasn't" and "Empire State of Mind" |
| 2022 | Central Park | Celeste (voice) | Episode: "Celeste We Forget" |
| 2022 | I Love That for You | Patricia Cochran | Main role |
| 2022 | Cars on the Road | Flo (voice) | Episode: "Dino Park" |
| 2022 | Dancing with the Stars | Herself | Episode: "Week 4: Disney+ Night" |
| 2023 | History of the World, Part II | Grandma / Crimean War nurse | Episode: "IV" |
| 2023–24 | Princess Power | Hilda (voice) | Episodes: "The Princesses Get a Roommate" and "Four Fruitdom Princess Coronation" |
| 2023; 2026 | The Upshaws | Dr. Pearl Edmunds | Episodes: "Thera Please", "Need Change", "Forbidden Fruit", "The Black-Lash" and "Cold Shoulder" |
| 2024 | Night Court | Erika Ellis | Episode: "A Crime of Fashion" |
| 2024 | Monsters at Work | Virginia Tuskmon (voice) | Recurring role |
| 2024 | So Help Me Todd | Jacqueline Burton | Episode: "End on a High Note" |
| 2024 | The Masked Singer | Herself / Miss Cleocatra | Episodes: "Group C Premiere: Billy Joel Night", "Girl Group Night", "Road to the Semi Finals" and "Who Can It Be Now?" |
| 2024 | Not Dead Yet | Donna | Episodes: "Not the End Yet" and "Not a Ghost Yet" |
| 2024 | The Fairly OddParents: A New Wish | Mother Nature (voice) | Episode: "Potazel Potahzel" |
| 2025 | And Just Like That… | Lucille Highwater | Episode: "Silent Mode" |
| 2025 | Haunted Hotel | Jezmeralda (voice) | Episode: "Welcome to the Undervale" |
| 2025 | Firebuds | Grandma Jones (voice) | Episode: "Father’s Day Hoedown/Big Brother BBQ" |
| 2025 | Disney Jr.’s Ariel | Nana Xola (voice) | Episode: "Family Treasure Hunt/Remy’s Big Feelings" |
| 2026 | A Different World | President Davenport | Episode: "Irreconcilable Differences" |
| 2026 | SuperKitties | Glammy (voice) | Upcoming episode: "Friendsgiving Feast" |
| 2027 | Cars: Lightning Racers | Flo (voice) | Upcoming series |
| TBA | Rhona Who Lives by the River | Missy (voice) | Upcoming series |

=== Video games ===
| Year | Title | Role | Notes |
|---|---|---|---|
| 2006 | Cars | Flo (voice) | |
| 2007 | Cars Mater-National Championship | Flo (voice) | |
| 2009 | Cars Race-O-Rama | Flo (voice) | |
| 2009 | The Princess and the Frog | Mama Odie (voice) | |
| 2011 | Cars 2: The Video Game | Flo (voice) | |
| 2012 | Sorcerers of the Magic Kingdom | Mama Odie / Shenzi (voice) | |
| 2013 | Disney Infinity | Flo (voice) | |
| 2014 | Cars: Fast as Lightning | Flo (voice) | |

=== Music videos ===
| Year | Title | Role | Notes |
|---|---|---|---|
| 1996 | On & On | Erykah's Mother | |
| 2018 | Forbidden | Nosy neighbor | "What's Going On", "Ring-a-Ling", "Apple Pie" |

=== Theme parks ===
| Year | Title | Role | Notes |
|---|---|---|---|
| 1989 | Body Wars | Ride Cue Instructional Video Announcer | Disney attraction |
| 2012 | Radiator Springs Racers | Flo | Disney attraction |
| 2024 | Tiana's Bayou Adventure | Mama Odie | Disney attraction |

== Awards and nominations ==
=== NAACP Image Awards ===
The NAACP Image Awards are awarded annually by the National Association for the Advancement of Colored People (NAACP). Lewis has received 7 nominations.

| Year | Award | Nominated work | Result |
|---|---|---|---|
| 1994 | Outstanding Supporting Actress in a Motion Picture | What's Love Got to Do with It | Nominated |
| 1997 | Outstanding Supporting Actress in a Motion Picture | The Preacher's Wife | Nominated |
| 2012 | Outstanding Actress in a Television Movie, Limited-Series or Dramatic Special | Five | Nominated |
| 2021 | Outstanding Supporting Actress in a Comedy Series | Black-ish | Nominated |
| 2022 | Outstanding Supporting Actress in a Comedy Series | Black-ish | Nominated |
| 2023 | Outstanding Supporting Actress in a Comedy Series | Black-ish | Nominated |
| 2023 | Outstanding Literary Work – Biography/Autobiography | Walking In My Joy: In These Streets | Nominated |

=== Miscellaneous honors ===
| Year | Award | Category | Nominated work | Result |
|---|---|---|---|---|
| 2009 | Annie Award | Outstanding Achievement for Voice Acting in a Feature Production | The Princess and the Frog | Nominated |
| 2016 | Critics' Choice Television Award | Best Guest Performer in a Comedy Series | Black-ish | Nominated |
| 2017 | Screen Actors Guild Award | Outstanding Performance by an Ensemble in a Comedy Series | Black-ish | Nominated |
| 2018 | Screen Actors Guild Award | Outstanding Performance by an Ensemble in a Comedy Series | Black-ish | Nominated |
| 2018 | Critics' Choice Award | Best Supporting Actress in a Comedy Series | Black-ish | Nominated |
| 2019 | Essence Award | Essence Honoree Award | Herself | Honored |
| 2022 | Satellite Award | Best Supporting Actress – Series, Miniseries or Television Film | Black-ish | Nominated |
| 2022 | Satellite Award | Honorary Satellite Award | Herself | Honored |
| 2022 | Hollywood Walk of Fame | | Herself | Inducted |
| 2024 | St. Louis Walk of Fame | | Herself | Inducted |
