= Alpha Man: The Brotherhood of MLK =

- Promotional poster
- Genre: Documentary
- Written by: Yaminah Ahmad; Annika Young
- Directed by: Rob Hardy
- Narrated by: Hill Harper
- Country of origin: United States
- Original language: English

Production
- Executive producers: Rob Hardy; Will Packer
- Producers: Dianne Ashford; Hill Harper
- Running time: 30 minutes

Original release
- Network: BET
- Release: August 28, 2011

Alpha Man: The Brotherhood of MLK is a television documentary film that reveals the story of Martin Luther King Jr.’s fraternity days as a member of Alpha Phi Alpha fraternity. Produced by Rainforest Films, the half-hour special originally aired August 28, 2011 on BET. The documentary special was scheduled to debut on the same day as the much-anticipated official dedication of the Martin Luther King, Jr. Memorial statue on the National Mall in Washington, D.C. The statue's dedication, which was to coincide with the 48th anniversary of the March on Washington and King’s "Dream" speech, was postponed until October 16, 2011, due to Hurricane Irene.

== Synopsis ==
Alpha Man: The Brotherhood of MLK tells the little-known story of Martin Luther King Jr.'s fraternity days as a member of the country's first collegiate black fraternity, Alpha Phi Alpha. Hosted and narrated by Hill Harper, the film gives first hand accounts by King's associates and follows King from a 23-year-old divinity student in Boston and 1952 Alpha pledgee to Nobel Peace Prize-winner and leading civil rights pioneer. The documentary also includes never been heard excerpts from King speaking at the 50th Anniversary of the Alpha Phi Alpha Fraternity, the only time he spoke at an Alpha convention.

== See also ==
- Civil rights movement in popular culture
