= Jacob's Ladder (2019 film) =

Film directed by David M. Rosenthal

- Film poster
- Directed by: David M. Rosenthal
- Screenplay by: Jeff Buhler; Sarah Thorp
- Story by: Jake Wade Wall; Jeff Buhler
- Based on: Jacob's Ladder by Bruce Joel Rubin
- Produced by: Will Packer; Mickey Liddell; Michael J. Gaeta; Alison R. Rosenzweig; Pete Shilaimon; Jennifer Monroe
- Starring: Michael Ealy; Jesse Williams; Nicole Beharie
- Cinematography: Pedro Luque
- Edited by: Richard Mettler
- Music by: Atli Örvarsson
- Production companies: LD Entertainment; Gaeta / Rosenzweig Films; Will Packer Productions
- Distributed by: Vertical Entertainment
- Release dates: July 25, 2019 (DISH Network); August 23, 2019 (United States)
- Running time: 89 minutes
- Country: United States
- Language: English

Jacob's Ladder is a 2019 American psychological horror film directed by David M. Rosenthal and written by Jeff Buhler and Sarah Thorp. A remake of the 1990 film Jacob's Ladder, it stars Michael Ealy, Jesse Williams, Nicole Beharie, Karla Souza, and Guy Burnet. It was broadcast on DISH Network on July 25, 2019, before the theatrical release on August 23, 2019, by Vertical Entertainment, to mostly negative reviews.

== Plot ==
"After losing his brother in combat, soldier Jacob Singer returns home from Afghanistan — only to be pulled into a mind-twisting state of paranoia. Singer soon realizes that his sibling is alive but life is not what it seems. With his life now altered, he must figure out what is real and what is not."

== Cast ==
- Michael Ealy as Jacob Singer
- Jesse Williams as Isaac Singer
- Nicole Beharie as Samantha Singer
- Karla Souza as Annie / Angel
- Guy Burnet as Hoffman, the Veteran Agency pharmacist

== Production ==
=== Development ===
In 2013, The Midnight Meat Train screenwriter Jeff Buhler was reported to be writing a script for LD Entertainment's new version of Jacob's Ladder. According to The Hollywood Reporter, "the producers are looking to make something more akin to an homage and not mimic the original. The plan is to contemporize the story with new situations and characters but still maintain a story that examines issues and poses existential questions".

James Foley was attached as director in November 2013. By March 2016, Foley was no longer attached to the project and was replaced by David M. Rosenthal. Rewrites were provided by Sarah Thorp when Buhler was unavailable to return.

Buhler said that since, due to two recent wars, the American "cultural understanding of the experience of warfare and what it does to people mentally" has become "a completely different place than it was" in 1990, he decided to not be "necessarily going to the same conclusion, and finding a new way to give the audience an experience that is similar in terms of impact and feeling, but that doesn't play the same tune. It was a very tricky situation in the sense that we were trying to recreate something, but honor the spirit and concept (of the original), while telling a different story". Buhler promised a different twist ending than in the original 1990 film.

=== Casting and filming ===
In March 2016, it was announced The Perfect Guy star Michael Ealy had signed on to star in and executive-produce the film. In April 2016, Jesse Williams and Nicole Beharie joined the cast of the film, followed by Guy Burnet and Karla Souza in June. Williams described the film as "a total re-imagining of the cult classic".

Principal photography began on May 2, 2016. By June, filming took place at the Avondale station in Decatur, Georgia and Peachtree Center in Atlanta. Production had concluded by August of that year. The first official trailer for the film was released on July 1, 2019.

== Release ==
Jacob's Ladder premiered on the DISH Network on July 25, 2019 before being released theatrically on August 23, 2019 by Vertical Entertainment. Previously, the film was set to be released by LD Entertainment on February 1, 2019.

It was released on Netflix December 22, 2019.

== Reception ==
On Rotten Tomatoes the film has an approval rating of 4% based on 24 reviews, with an average rating of 3.8/10. The site's consensus reads, "A needless remake that quickly loses sight of the themes that elevated the original, this is a Jacob's Ladder that leads straight to nowhere." On Metacritic it has a weighted average score of 31 out of 100 based on reviews from eight critics, indicating "generally unfavorable" reviews.

John DeFore of The Hollywood Reporter wrote: "As jumbled as all this is, the film never achieves the kind of sweaty intensity of the original." Owen Gleiberman of Variety said the film "plays like a half-hearted sketch of the movie it could have been." RogerEbert.com's Brian Tallerico gave it 1/4 stars, saying it "has some scary faces and a tacked-on commentary about PTSD and government intervention that feels cheap and unearned. Only the commitment from the always-solid Michael Ealy saves it from being one of the worst movies of the year, although just barely." Noel Murray of the Los Angeles Times wrote that the film was "less strange and scary, and more mindlessly action-packed. It doesn't feel like a dream. It's more like hearing a stranger describe a dream."
