= Stomp the Yard =

2007 film by Sylvain White

- Theatrical release poster
- Directed by: Sylvain White
- Written by: Robert Adetuyi; Gregory Anderson
- Produced by: Will Packer; Rob Hardy
- Starring: Columbus Short; Meagan Good; Ne-Yo; Darrin Henson; Brian White; Laz Alonso; Valarie Pettiford; Harry Lennix; Chris Brown
- Cinematography: Scott Kevan
- Edited by: David Checel
- Music by: Sam Retzer; Tim Boland
- Production companies: Screen Gems; Rainforest Films
- Distributed by: Sony Pictures Releasing
- Release date: January 12, 2007
- Running time: 109 minutes
- Country: United States
- Language: English
- Budget: $13 million
- Box office: $75.5 million

Stomp the Yard is a 2007 American dance drama film produced by Rainforest Films and released through Sony Pictures' Screen Gems division on January 12, 2007. Directed by Sylvain White, Stomp the Yard centers on DJ Williams, a college student at a fictional historically black university who pledges to join a fictional Greek-letter fraternity. The film's central conflict involves DJ's fraternity competing in various stepping competitions against a rival fraternity of the same school. The film's script was written by Robert Adetuyi, working from an original draft by Gregory Ramon Anderson. The film was originally titled Steppin', but to avoid confusion over the 2006 film Step Up, the title was changed. Delta Sigma Theta along with other sororities like Gamma Theta were in the movie.

The film stars Columbus Short, Meagan Good, Darrin Henson, Brian White, Laz Alonso, and Valarie Pettiford, with Harry Lennix, and, in their film debuts, R&B singers Ne-Yo & Chris Brown. Stomp the Yard was filmed in Atlanta, Georgia, on the campuses of Morris Brown College, Georgia Institute of Technology, Morehouse College, and Clark Atlanta University, and in the MAK Historic District of Decatur, Georgia. Elsewhere Short, Alonso and Brown had also starred together in the film This Christmas.

== Plot ==
DJ Williams is a young man in inner-city Los Angeles. He and his younger brother Duron compete in local dance competitions as members of a crew known as the "Goon Squad". At the end of an intense dance battle, the Goon Squad wins a cash-prize. Sphere, the leader of rival crew The Thug Unit, goes all in for a double-or-nothing battle. DJ accepts to Duron's dismay, knowing they risk violent retaliation from the opposing crew. The Goon Squad wins the second battle and the Thug Unit responds by ambushing DJ and his crewmates as they are walking home. A fight breaks out, and Sphere starts beating up DJ. Duron pushes him away and starts fighting him. Sphere pulls out a gun and fatally shoots Duron, devastating DJ.

After DJ is arrested and convicted of assault, his mother (wanting him to avoid prison) sends him to live with his aunt Jackie and uncle Nate in Atlanta, Georgia, where he is to attend the historically black Truth University. Nate, the physical plant director at Truth, aims to teach DJ responsibility and puts him to work doing maintenance as part of a work-study program.

DJ sees April Palmer, to whom he is immediately attracted. After registration, he moves into his dorm room, where he meets his new roommate Rich Brown. Rich meets with DJ at a stepping competition on the green between the Truth chapters of rival fraternities Theta Nu Theta and Mu Gamma Xi. The Mu Gamma Xi crew, seven-time national stepping champions, easily steals the show until DJ runs right through their step line in an attempt to speak to April. April rebuffs DJ's romantic attempts and returns to her boyfriend Grant, the co-leader of the Gammas.

That night, DJ, Rich, and their friends Byron, Paul and East go out to a local club called the Phoenix for the "Rep Your City" event. Hoping to impress April and upstage Grant and the Gammas (all of whom are also in attendance), DJ takes to the floor. Despite the animosity between DJ and Grant, the Gammas recognize his skills as a dancer and their chapter president Zeke invites him to pledge for Mu Gamma Xi. DJ turns down both Zeke's offer as well as an offer from the Theta Nu Theta chapter's leader Sylvester.

After learning that April is a student history tutor, DJ signs himself up for tutoring so that he can spend time with her. The two slowly begin a friendship and DJ takes April out to dinner. During their date, April discusses the importance of black fraternities and sororities with DJ, and tells him to visit Heritage Hall on the campus' Greek Row.

The next day, DJ learns about the significant number of African-American historical figures and celebrities who were members of various Greek-letter organizations, and decides to pledge for the Theta chapter along with Rich and their friend Noel. After "crossing over" to become official Theta members, DJ, Rich, and Noel join the Thetas' step crew.

While having dinner, April breaks up with Grant due to his arrogant and selfish behavior and his failure to know anything about her, particularly that green is her favorite color. She grows closer to DJ and they eventually become a couple. While at practice, DJ, Rich, Noel and other new members realize the step dance moves are old fashioned and aren't good enough to win the stepping competition. They decide to take the time to learn fresher moves. Sly then gathers his older members and challenges DJ and the rest to an old school vs. new school stepping contest. DJ blows the contest due to his showboating. They remind DJ, much like Duron did, that it is about the team and not about him. DJ apologizes to the entire fraternity and is quickly forgiven. Sly also requests that DJ show the team some of his street moves.

A few days before the competition, Grant stumbles upon DJ's file and discovers his assault record and presents it to the board. The board suspends DJ for not disclosing his criminal record. Dr. Palmer, who is April's father, calls in DJ to his office. He says he is willing to lift his suspension on the condition that DJ stays away from April. DJ declines the ultimatum and walks away. DJ then tells Nate and Jackie about the suspension. They then reveal that Jackie dated Dr. Palmer, a Gamma, until she met Nate and there has been animosity between Nate and Palmer ever since. Jackie confronts Palmer about DJ's suspension and Palmer claims he is only protecting April, who then confronts her father about the situation, having been listening from outside the door. Dr. Palmer reinstates DJ, deciding that he would rather deal with DJ in April's life than to lose April in his.

DJ rejoins the Thetas to compete alongside them against the Gammas in the stepping competition. Both teams are tied at the end and it is brought into sudden death rules to determine a winner. Unknown to DJ and the Thetas, the Gammas had recorded DJ practicing his moves prior to the competition. Going first, Grant uses some of DJ’s moves from the videotape. After he finishes, DJ matches Grant move for move, then finishes with Duron's signature move, something the Gammas didn't get on tape. The Thetas finally defeat the Gammas. April goes on stage to hug and kiss DJ. While celebrating their victory, DJ is still wearing Duron's gloves, and he kisses his fist and throws it in the air in honor of his brother. The Thetas have their picture taken, and it is displayed in Heritage Hall.

== Cast ==
- Columbus Short as Darnell James "D.J." Williams, a gifted street dancer who starts as a selfish loner.
- Meagan Good as April Palmer, D.J.'s love interest, and Dr. Palmer's daughter.
- Ne-Yo as Rich Brown, D.J.'s roommate.
- Darrin Henson as Grant, the star stepper of Truth University and D.J.'s adversary.
- Harry J. Lennix as Nathan Williams, D.J.'s uncle, and Dr. Palmer's adversary.
- Valarie Pettiford as Jackie Williams, D.J.'s aunt and Dr. Palmer's old college girlfriend.
- April Clark as Maya, April's best friend.
- Brian J. White as Sylvester, the president of Theta Nu Theta.
- Laz Alonso as Zeke, the president of Mu Gamma Xi.
- A. JC. Jones as Al "Big Al", voted most respectable Kappa since 2007.
- Jermaine Williams as Noel, Rich's friend.
- Chris Brown as Duron Williams, D.J.'s younger brother who was killed in the beginning of the movie.
- Allan Louis as Dr. William Palmer, April Palmer's father and Nate's adversary.
- Chuck Maldonado, Celebrity Choreographer and Creative Director of World of Step

== Soundtrack ==
A soundtrack containing hip hop music was released on April 24, 2007 by Artists' Addiction Records. It peaked at 20 on the Top Soundtracks.

"Hall of Fame" written by Jason Horns & performed by Tha J-Squad Published by Tha J Squad Beat Mastaz (ASCAP) Courtesy of Tha J Squad Beat Mastaz Productionz

== Alpha Phi Alpha boycott threat ==
A boycott of the film was threatened by Alpha Phi Alpha fraternity and supported by Alpha Kappa Alpha sorority, due to a conflict between the organizations and Stomp the Yard producers Will Packer and Rob Hardy (both members of Alpha Phi Alpha) over the unauthorized use of some of Alpha Phi Alpha's trademarks in the film. The groups ended their threat when Sony Pictures and Screen Gems agreed to the removal of all references to the fraternity from the film. Sony and Screen Gems made a decision for a donation to The Washington, D.C. Martin Luther King, Jr. National Memorial Project Foundation, a project of Alpha Phi Alpha. The disputed scenes of Alpha Phi Alpha steppers which were deleted from the final release print appear in both versions of the Stomp the Yard movie trailer. Despite the controversy, the filmmakers were honored by Alpha Phi Alpha at the Fraternity's 103rd Anniversary Convention held in New Orleans in 2009.

== Reception ==
The film opened at number-one with a first-weekend gross of $22 million, becoming the first film in three weekends to beat out Night at the Museum at the box office. Stomp the Yard, produced on a budget of $13 million, eventually went on to gross $61 million in the United States and $75 million worldwide.

On review aggregator Rotten Tomatoes, the film holds an approval rating of 27% based on 90 reviews, with an average rating of 4.6/10. The website's critics consensus reads: "While Stomp the Yard contains impressive musical and dance numbers, it loses its momentum during the intervening soap opera-style subplots." On Metacritic, the film has a weighted average score of 44 out of 100, based on 24 critics, indicating "mixed or average reviews".

Sony Pictures held a national high school stepping competition in conjunction with the release of the film. The winning team was from North Stafford High School in the suburb of Stafford, Virginia.

== Sequel ==
Rainforest Films announced a Stomp the Yard sequel, called Stomp the Yard: Homecoming. The studio signed on studio partner Rob Hardy to direct. Columbus Short, who starred in the original Sony Screen Gems release, makes a cameo appearance as DJ. Other cast members include Terrence J of 106 & Park, Tyler Nelson from Taking the Stage, former Cheetah Girls member Kiely Williams, singer/rapper Teyana Taylor, Pooch Hall from The Game, and Miracle's Boys.
