= Think Like a Man Too =

- Theatrical release posters
- Directed by: Tim Story
- Written by: David A. Newman; Keith Merryman
- Based on: Act Like a Lady, Think Like a Man by Steve Harvey
- Produced by: Will Packer
- Starring: Michael Ealy; Jerry Ferrara; Meagan Good; Regina Hall; Taraji P. Henson; Terrence J; Romany Malco; Wendi McLendon-Covey; Gary Owen; Gabrielle Union; La La Anthony; Kevin Hart
- Cinematography: Christopher Duskin
- Edited by: Peter S. Elliot
- Music by: Christopher Lennertz
- Production companies: Screen Gems; Will Packer Productions
- Distributed by: Sony Pictures Releasing
- Release date: June 20, 2014 (United States)
- Running time: 106 minutes
- Country: United States
- Language: English
- Budget: $24 million
- Box office: $70.2 million

Think Like a Man Too is a 2014 American romantic comedy film directed by Tim Story. It is the sequel to the 2012 film Think Like a Man, based on Steve Harvey's 2009 book Act Like a Lady, Think Like a Man. The script was written by David A. Newman and Keith Merryman, with Will Packer returning as producer but now under his Will Packer Productions banner. The film stars Michael Ealy, Meagan Good, Regina Hall, Terrence J, Taraji P. Henson, Romany Malco, Gabrielle Union, Jerry Ferrara, Wendi McLendon-Covey, Gary Owen and Kevin Hart, with Jennifer Lewis and La La Anthony in supporting roles.

Think Like a Man Too was released on June 20, 2014, by Screen Gems. It grossed $70.2 million against a $24 million budget.

== Plot ==
Cedric (Kevin Hart) and his friends are all in Las Vegas for the wedding of Michael (Terrence J) and Candace (Regina Hall), with her son Duke (Caleel Harris) and mother (Angela Gibbs) joining them. Zeke (Romany Malco) and Mya (Meagan Good) arrive, with Zeke's womanizing past constantly being brought up by old friends and former flames, including the concierge at the hotel, who throws her drink in his face. Bennett (Gary Owen) and his wife Tish (Wendi McLendon-Covey) are trying to get a spark back in their marriage. Jeremy (Jerry Ferrara) and Kristen (Gabrielle Union) have married and are now trying for a baby. Dominic (Michael Ealy) and Lauren (Taraji P. Henson) are reunited after spending time away from each other, and they make out in the limousine. Finally, Cedric arrives at the hotel in a gaudy sports car, happily getting away from his wife Gail (Wendy Williams).

Michael's overbearing mother Loretta (Jenifer Lewis) doesn't approve of his engagement to Candace, still thinking no woman is good enough for her son. Loretta even takes over the bachelorette party duties, even though Lauren is the maid of honor. The women have a party for Candace, until Loretta makes up her own party.

Among other problems plaguing the couples include Lauren being called by her boss Lee (Kelsey Grammer), who tells her she is being considered for a COO position in New York, meaning she will be separated from Dominic. Kristen tries to get Jeremy to have sex with her by roleplaying "Game of Thrones" characters, but Jeremy has reservations about becoming a father. Mya is ready to marry Zeke, but Zeke shows hesitation.

While the ladies have to deal with Loretta, Lauren and Candace conspire to set her up with Candace's Uncle Eddie. Loretta takes the ladies out to dinner, and later plans to take Candace to see Dionne Warwick. Uncle Eddie (Dennis Haysbert) shows up and begins flirting with Loretta. The ladies leave to see Dionne Warwick together. The guys run into Michael's old frat brothers Isaac (Adam Brody) and Terrell (David Walton), who just want to party.

The ladies gives Tish a makeover. They then go to the club, forcing the guys to either take a Chippendale-type bus, or walk. They choose the latter.

Cedric finds himself in trouble when Gail finds out that he's been using her card to pay for his expenses, running her up to $40,000 in charges. He tries to win it back at the casino, putting it all on his "lucky number" 15. While his back is turned, Zeke pulls all but one of the chips away to spare Cedric the loss. However, the ball lands on 15, and Cedric is angry at Zeke. As a last resort, Cedric takes the guys to the club (the same one the ladies are at) for amateur's night, dressing in various costumes to try and win some money. This, however, turns into a disaster when Michael sees Candace getting a lap dance; he charges to attack the dancer, leading to an all-out fight between the guys, the ladies, and the dancers. They are all put in jail for the night.

Realizing that the wedding is in a few hours, they all try to call someone for help, but with no luck: Loretta is busy spending the night with Eddie in her room; Gail is already shacking up with Drake (who appears as himself); Bennett's mother has gone to pick up his kid. Jeremy sees the way he talks to his child, and is influenced to become a father. The guys blame Cedric for getting them into this mess.

Jeremy decides that he's finally committed to being a father, and Kristen reveals she might be pregnant (though she claims to be a week late), bringing the two closer. Zeke apologizes to Mya for everything that's been going on, and finally proposes to her; Mya accepts.

Loretta is unable to find Michael and looks for him in Candace's room and tries getting rid of Candace. Michael overhears her and confronts her, declaring that he will marry Candace whether she likes it or not, and that she will no longer be invited to the wedding. Candace disagrees with Michael, saying that he needs to apologize to Loretta, because as a mother herself, she would be heartbroken if her own son did not let her go to his wedding. Loretta apologizes, and the three reconcile.

Cedric packs his bags to leave Vegas; however, with the help of his personal butler, Declan (Jim Piddock), he finds another venue. Candace and Michael are married, and everybody celebrates.

== Cast ==
- Kevin Hart as Cedric Ward
- Regina Hall as Candace Hall
- Michael Ealy as Dominic
- Jerry Ferrara as Jeremy Kern
- Meagan Good as Mya
- Taraji P. Henson as Lauren Harris
- Dennis Haysbert as Uncle Eddie
- Gabrielle Union as Kristen Kern
- Terrence J as Michael Hanover
- Jenifer Lewis as Loretta
- Romany Malco as Zeke
- Wendi McLendon-Covey as Tish
- Gary Owen as Bennett
- David Walton as Terrell
- Adam Brody as Isaac
- La La Anthony as Sonia
- Jim Piddock as Declan
- Wendy Williams as Gail Ward
- Kelsey Grammer as Lee Fox
- Cheryl Hines as Andrea
- Luenell as Aunt Winnie Hall
- Janina Gavankar as Vanessa
- Carl Weathers as Mr. Davenport
- Floyd Mayweather Jr. as himself
- Coco Austin as herself
- Drake as himself

== Production ==
Will Packer produced Think Like a Man Too. Principal photography began in June 2013 in Las Vegas. The first trailer for the film debuted on February 11, 2014, and appeared in theaters with Ealy, Hart and Hall's About Last Night. Director Tim Story said of the cast says "the trust that he and the cast built last time, combined with their matched work ethic, made continuing the narrative feel like “coming back together with your brothers and sisters.” He also mentioned they had to move out of a suite in the filming and there was a lot of noise.

== Soundtrack ==
For the soundtrack to Think Like a Man Too, singer Mary J. Blige recorded an entire collection of music from and inspired by the film. Released on June 17, 2014, it includes a remake of Shalamar's hit "A Night to Remember".

== Reception ==
=== Box office ===
Think Like a Man Too grossed $65.2 million in North America and $5 million in other territories for a total worldwide gross of $70.2 million, against a budget of $24 million.

Released in theaters on June 20, 2014, the film opened at #1 at the box office, grossing $29.2 million.

=== Critical response ===
On Rotten Tomatoes the film has an approval rating of 23% based on 81 reviews, with an average rating of 4.8/10. The site's critical consensus reads, "Think Like a Man Too reunites its predecessor's talented cast, but fails to take their characters in new or interesting directions." On Metacritic, the film has a score of 38 out of 100, based on 30 critics, indicating "generally unfavorable reviews". On CinemaScore, audiences gave the film an average grade of "A−" on an A+ to F scale. Kelsey Grammer won a Razzie for Worst Supporting Actor for his role in this movie and several others.

=== Home media ===
Think Like a Man Too was released on DVD and Blu-ray on September 16, 2014, and Triple Pack includes Think Like a Man and About Last Night (2014 film).

== See also ==
- List of films set in Las Vegas
