= The Heart Specialist =

- Theatrical release poster
- Directed by: Dennis Cooper
- Written by: Dennis Cooper
- Produced by: Dennis Cooper; Kristin Overn
- Starring: Wood Harris; Brian J. White; Zoe Saldaña; Nephew Tommy; Marla Gibbs; Jasmine Guy; Method Man; Jenifer Lewis; Leon; Mýa; Ed Asner; Kenneth Choi
- Cinematography: Yasu Tanida
- Edited by: Jonathan Schwartz
- Music by: Tree Adams; Christopher Faizi
- Distributed by: Freestyle Releasing
- Release dates: September 13, 2006 (Boston); January 14, 2011
- Running time: 99 minutes
- Country: United States
- Language: English
- Budget: $3 million
- Box office: $1.1 million

The Heart Specialist is a 2006 American romantic comedy-drama film written, produced and directed by Dennis Cooper, and starring Wood Harris, Zoe Saldaña, Brian J. White and Mýa. Originally released under the title Ways of the Flesh, the film premiered at the 2006 Boston Film Festival and remained unreleased until 2011, when it was granted a limited theatrical release by Freestyle Releasing.

== Plot ==
A modern comedy about the everyday perils of first year medical residents at a shabby south Florida hospital. Wood Harris is the Chief Resident, who teaches the trainees how to save lives and not take themselves too seriously, all the while hiding a chilling secret of his own.

== Cast ==
- Wood Harris as Dr. Sidney Zachary
- Zoe Saldaña as Donna Chaisson
- Brian J. White as Dr. Ray Howard
- Mýa as Valerie
- Scott Paulin as Dr. Graves
- David S. Lee as Dr. Propper
- Kenneth Choi as Mitchell Kwan
- Marla Gibbs as Mrs. Underwood
- Jenifer Lewis as Nurse Jackson
- Method Man as Lorenzo Chaisson
- Leon as Dr. Lee
- Jasmine Guy as Aunt Burnetta
- Terrence J as Jenks
- Ed Asner as Mr. Olson
- Thomas "Nephew Tommy" Miles as Curtis Underwood

== Reception ==
The Heart Specialist ranked premiered nineteenth at the box office grossing $581,516 over the four-day Martin Luther King Jr. holiday weekend.
