= Rainforest Films =

American film production company

- Industry: Entertainment
- Founded: 1994
- Founder: Rob Hardy; Will Packer
- Defunct: June 23, 2014
- Fate: Dissolved by lawsuit
- Headquarters: Atlanta, Georgia, United States
- Key people: Rob Hardy; Will Packer
- Products: Film, television, home entertainment
- Website: Official site

Rainforest Films was a film production company founded in 1994 by Rob Hardy and Will Packer that produced films geared towards African Americans.

== History ==
With his Alpha Phi Alpha fraternity brothers William Packer and Gregory Anderson producing, Rob Hardy wrote and directed Chocolate City, a $20,000 film that Blockbuster distributed through its video stores. The film about a young man's profound experience on a black college campus, was shot using 16mm color film on the campus of Florida A&M University in Tallahassee, Florida. In 1994, on the eve of the success of Chocolate City, Hardy and Packer created Rainforest Films. One of the most important goals of Rainforest Films is to create work that will uplift, instead of degrade, the African-American spirit.

After relocating from Tallahassee to Atlanta, Georgia, the company produced the erotic thriller Trois in 2000. Funded, produced and distributed independently, Trois became the fastest black indie film to ever surpass the $1 million mark at the box office. With this achievement, Rainforest Films landed at the #34 spot of The Hollywood Reporter's Top 500 Film Distributors of 2000, and resulted in Trois being named one of Daily Variety's Top 50 Highest Grossing Independent Films of the Year.

In 2002, Rainforest Films released the critically acclaimed motion picture Pandora's Box at the American Black Film Festival. Later that year, The Hollywood Reporter listed Rob Hardy and William Packer amongst the New Establishment of Black Power Brokers in Hollywood. Rainforest Films acquired the US distribution rights to Master P's gritty prison drama Lockdown in 2003. The film received a limited theatrical run but eventually became one of Columbia TriStar Home Entertainment's top selling independent releases of the year.

== Dissolution of company and lawsuit ==
In June 2014, Packer and Hardy announced that Rainforest Films was being dissolved that month pursuant to a 68.1% vote by the shareholders of its holding company, Rainforest Productions Holdings, on June 2, 2014. The last Will Packer-produced film that appears under the Rainforest Films banner is About Last Night. Think Like a Man Too, No Good Deed, The Wedding Ringer and Ride Along 2 (all Will Packer-produced films that were filming or in post-production at the time of Rainforest Films' dissolution) will fall under the new shingle Will Packer Productions.

On June 20, 2014, Bronner Bros. president and CEO Bernard Bronner, who owns 30.8% of the Rainforest Productions Holdings and voted against the dissolution of Rainforest Films, filed a lawsuit against the holding company and co founders Will Packer and Rob Hardy alleging, inter alia, breaches of fiduciary duty, gross mismanagement, misappropriation of corporate assets, waste of corporate assets and abuse of control. Bronner states in the suit that he invested over $500,000 and raised another $250,000 to start Rainforest Films back in 2000 and was one-third owner of the company. Bronner claims he was systematically shut out of Rainforest by Hardy and Packer, who assumed daily operations of the company, limited information Bronner received about the company as well as limited Bronner's decision-making authority. Bronner, who is demanding a trial by jury, is seeking judgement against Hardy and Packer for the allegations as well as an award of punitive damages. Rainforest Productions Holdings has described Bronner's lawsuit as frivolous, and said that the lawsuit has been sent to its lawyers for vigorous defense and potential countersuit against Bronner in light of the scurrilous nature of Bronner's allegations. Rainforest Productions Holdings and Hardy and Packer are not presently commenting further on the Bronner lawsuit.

== Movies produced by Rainforest Films ==
=== Theatrical releases ===
Release date	Title	Directed by	Budget	Gross
March 10, 2000	Trois	Rob Hardy	$250,000	$1,161,843
September 15, 2000 (international); February 14, 2003 (U.S.)	Lockdown	John Luessenhop	TK	$449,482
August 9, 2002	Trois 2: Pandora's Box	Rob Hardy	$800,000	$881,950
October 7, 2005	The Gospel	Rob Hardy	$4,000,000	$15,778,152
January 12, 2007	Stomp the Yard	Sylvain White	$13,000,000	$75,511,123
November 21, 2007	This Christmas	Preston A. Whitmore II	$13,000,000	$49,778,552
April 24, 2009	Obsessed	Steve Shill	$20,000,000	$73,830,340
August 27, 2010	Takers	John Luessenhop	$32,000,000	$69,055,695
April 20, 2012	Think Like a Man	Tim Story	$12,000,000	$100,070,507
January 17, 2014	Ride Along	Tim Story	$25,000,000	$153,262,184
February 14, 2014	About Last Night	Steve Pink	$12,500,000	$49,002,684

=== Direct-to-video releases ===
- Chocolate City (1994)
- Motives (2004)
- Trois: The Escort (2004)
- The Gospel Live (2005)
- Puff, Puff, Pass (2006)
- Motives 2: Retribution (2007)
- Three Can Play That Game (2008)
- Stomp the Yard: Homecoming (2010)
