= Michael Ealy =

American actor (born 1973)

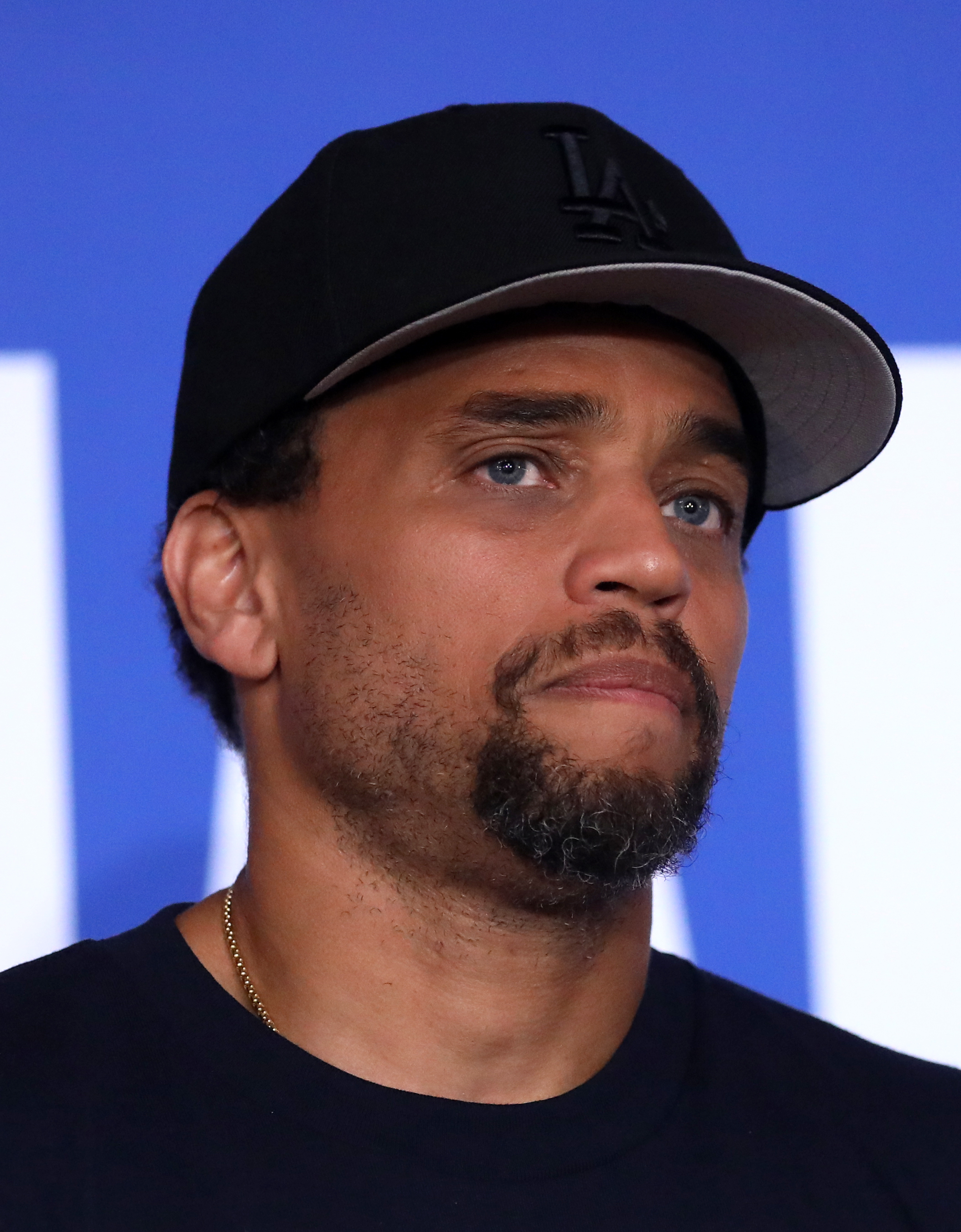
- Ealy in 2024
- Born: Michael David Brown; August 3, 1973 (age 53); Washington, D.C., U.S.
- Education: University of Maryland (BA)
- Occupation: Actor
- Years active: 2000–present
- Spouse: Khatira Rafiqzada (m. 2012)
- Children: 2

Michael David Brown (born August 3, 1973), known professionally as Michael Ealy, is an American actor. He is known for his roles in the films such as Barbershop (2002), 2 Fast 2 Furious (2003), Takers (2010), Think Like a Man (2012), About Last Night (2014), Think Like a Man Too (2014), The Perfect Guy (2015), The Intruder and Jacob's Ladder (both in 2019) and Fatale (2020). Ealy also had roles in the television sitcoms including FlashFoward, Bel-Air, Being Mary Jane, and Power Book II: Ghost.

== Early life ==
Ealy was born in Washington, D.C., and was raised in Silver Spring, Maryland. Ealy went to Springbrook High School and graduated from the University of Maryland in College Park, Maryland in 1996 with a degree in English. His mother worked for IBM and his father was in the grocery business.

== Career ==
He started his acting career in the late 1990s, appearing in several off-Broadway stage productions. Among his first film roles were Bad Company and Kissing Jessica Stein. His breakout role came in 2002's Barbershop, in which he plays reformed felon Ricky Nash, a role that he reprised in the 2004 sequel, Barbershop 2: Back in Business. In 2003, he played the role of Slap Jack in the second installment of the Fast and the Furious film series, 2 Fast 2 Furious. Later in 2004, Ealy appeared in Never Die Alone with DMX. He also appeared in Mariah Carey's music video for her hit single "Get Your Number" from her 2005 album The Emancipation of Mimi.

In 2005, Ealy co-starred in the television film version of Their Eyes Were Watching God, produced by Oprah Winfrey and Quincy Jones, and starring Academy Award-winning actress Halle Berry. The same year, he starred in the independent film Jellysmoke, directed by Mark Banning. He starred in the Showtime television series Sleeper Cell, the first season of which aired December 4–18, 2005, and the second season of which, Sleeper Cell: American Terror, aired December 10–17, 2006.

On December 14, 2006, Ealy was nominated for a Golden Globe Award for his role in Sleeper Cell: American Terror in the category Best Performance by an Actor in a Mini-Series or Motion Picture Made for Television. In December 2008 he was featured in the movie Seven Pounds alongside Will Smith as Ben Thomas. He also starred as the male lead in Beyoncé's "Halo" music video, and as CIA Field Officer Marshall Vogel in the ABC television series FlashForward.

Ealy also appears in the limited-edition coffee table book (About Face) by celebrity photographer John Russo, published by Pixie Press Worldwide. In 2009, Ealy performed in The People Speak, a documentary feature film that uses dramatic and musical performances of the letters, diaries, and speeches of everyday Americans, based on historian Howard Zinn's A People's History of the United States.

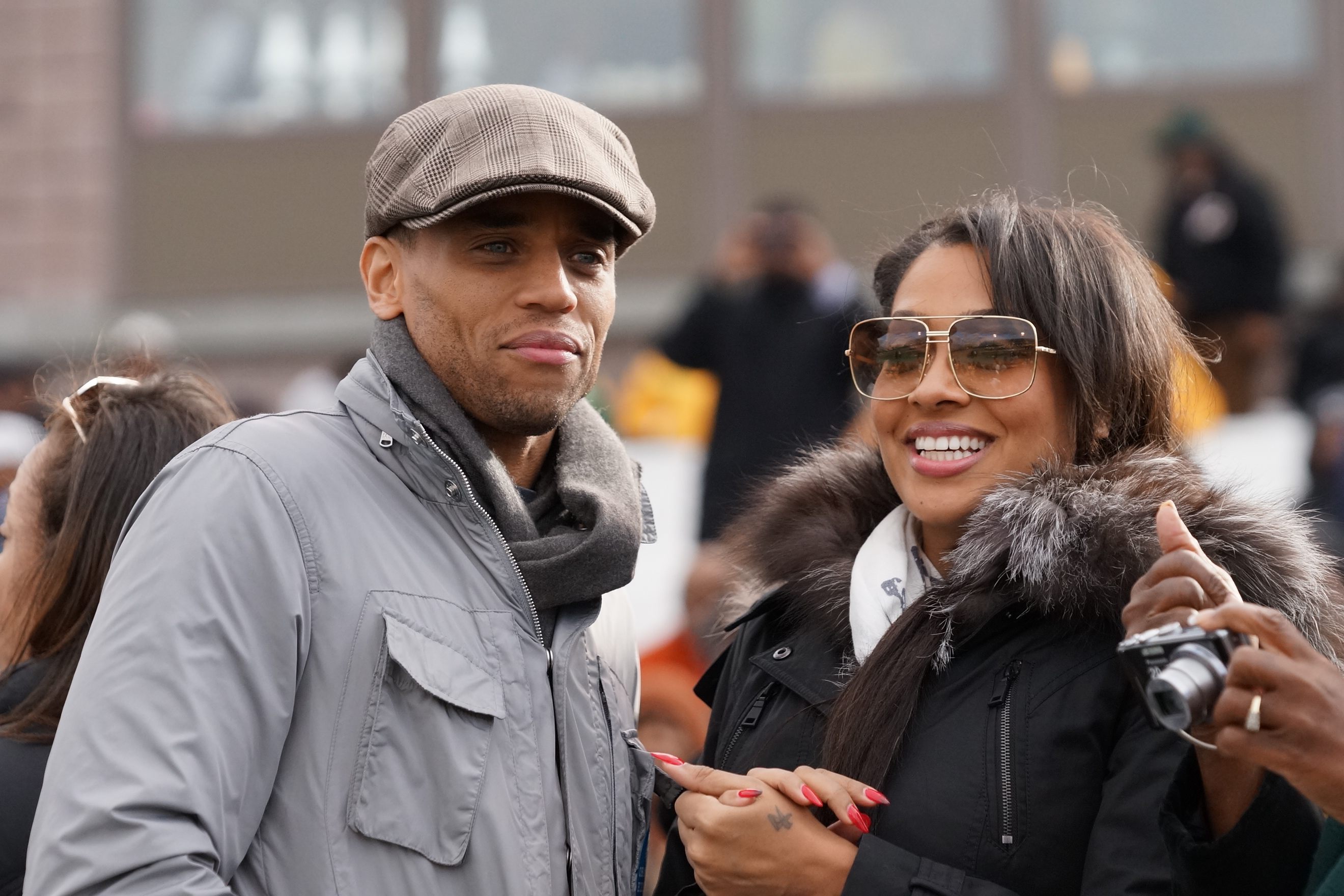
Ealy with Lala Anthony in 2012.

In 2010, Ealy appeared as attorney Derrick Bond in the second season of The Good Wife. He co-starred in the 2010 action movie Takers as Jake Attica and appeared as Travis Marks in USA Network's original series Common Law about two cops who have to go to couples counseling because they argue too much. Common Law premiered following Fairly Legal on Friday, May 11, 2012.

Ealy appeared as Dominic in the 2012 ensemble comedy Think Like a Man and its 2014 sequel, Think Like a Man Too, and appeared as "Papa Joe" in the 2012 inspirational film Unconditional. He appeared opposite Think Like a Man co-star Kevin Hart in the 2014 remake of About Last Night.

In 2013, Ealy signed on to play co-lead "Dorian" in the Fox television series Almost Human. The sci-fi police procedural takes place in the year 2048 and follows the relationship between two cops as they struggle to solve futuristic crimes that involve complex technology. Ealy depicts the android "Dorian", an older, "DRN" android model that is considered to be less reliable due to its artificial emotions and that is tasked with protecting his partner John Kennex (Karl Urban). The show aired for one season on Fox from 2013 to 2014.

In 2015, Ealy played serial killer "Theo Noble" in season 3 of the Fox television series The Following. He starred as Eric Warner in the second season of the ABC mystery crime series Secrets and Lies, which aired in the fall of 2016. From 2017 to 2019, Ealy starred in the fourth, fifth and final season of Being Mary Jane opposite Gabrielle Union. 2019 also saw Ealy star in Stumptown on ABC alongside Cobie Smulders, Jake Johnson and Camryn Manheim.

== Personal life ==
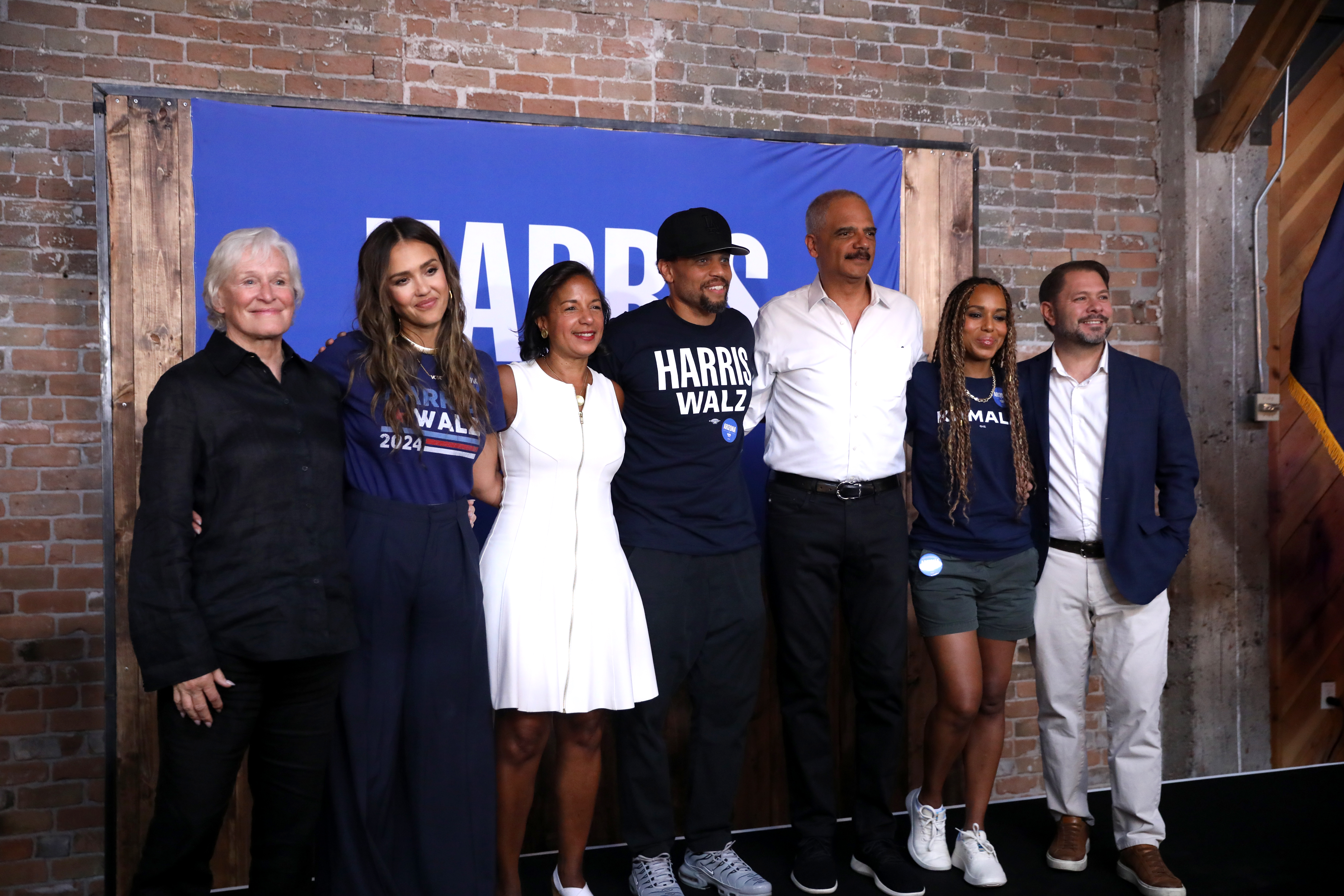
(Left to right) Actors Glenn Close, Jessica Alba, Ealy, and Kerry Washington show their support for Kamala Harris and Tim Walz in the 2024 presidential election

In October 2012, Ealy married Afghan-American entrepreneur Khatira Rafiqzada, his girlfriend of four years, in a ceremony in Los Angeles, and together they have a son and a daughter.

Ealy is a fan of the Washington Commanders.

Ealy is a Democrat. In 2024, he publicly endorsed and supported Angela Alsobrooks in the Senate election in Maryland. He also showed support for Vice President Kamala Harris and Tim Walz in their campaign for the 2024 presidential election.

== Filmography ==
=== Film ===
Year	Film	Role	Notes
2000	The Lush Life	Isaac Youngblood	Short
2001	Kissing Jessica Stein	Greg	
2002	Bad Company	G-Mo	
2002	Barbershop	Ricky Nash	
2003	Justice	Woody	
2003	2 Fast 2 Furious	Slap Jack	
2004	November	Jesse	
2004	Never Die Alone	Michael	
2004	Barbershop 2: Back in Business	Ricky Nash	
2005	Their Eyes Were Watching God	Virgible 'Tea Cake' Woods	TV movie
2005	Jellysmoke	Jacob	
2007	Put It in a Book	Akmed	Short
2007	Suspect	Detective Marcus Tillman	TV movie
2008	Miracle at St. Anna	Sgt. Cummings	
2008	Seven Pounds	Ben Thomas	
2009	The People Speak	Himself	
2010	Takers	Jake Attica	
2010	For Colored Girls	Beau Willie	
2011	Margaret	Dave the Lawyer	
2012	Underworld: Awakening	Detective Sebastian	
2012	Think Like a Man	Dominic	
2012	Unconditional	"Papa Joe" Bradford	
2013	The Signal	Daniel Miller	Short
2013	Last Vegas	Ezra	
2014	About Last Night	Danny	
2014	Think Like a Man Too	Dominic	
2015	The Perfect Guy	Carter Duncan/Robert Adams	
2019	The Intruder	Scott Russell	
2019	Stucco	X	Short
2019	Jacob's Ladder	Jacob Singer	
2020	aTypical Wednesday	Dr. Jones	
2020	Really Love	Yusef Davis	
2020	Fatale	Derrick Tyler	
2022	The Devil You Know	Detective Joe McDonald	
2024	It Takes a Village	Lawrence Cooke	Short

=== Television ===
Year	Film	Role	Notes
2000	Law & Order	Private Nelson	Episode: "Vaya Con Dios"
2000	Madigan Men	Runner	Episode: "Love and Dermatology"
2001	Soul Food	Steve	Episode: "Little Girl Blue"
2002–03	ER	Rick Kendrick	Recurring role (season 9)
2005–06	Sleeper Cell	Darwyn al-Sayeed	Main cast
2009	Hawthorne	Dr. Alan Phillips	Episode: "The Sense of Belonging"
2009–10	FlashForward	CIA Agent Marshall Vogel	Recurring cast
2010–11	The Good Wife	Derrick Bond	Recurring role (season 2)
2011	Californication	Ben	Recurring role (season 4)
2012	Common Law	Travis Marks	Main cast
2013–14	Almost Human	Dorian	Main cast
2014–16	Celebrity Name Game	Himself/Celebrity Player	Recurring Celebrity Player (seasons 1–2)
2014–19	Hollywood Game Night	Himself/Celebrity Player	Guest Celebrity Player (seasons 2, 4 & 6)
2015	The Following	Theo Noble	Main cast (season 3)
2016	Barbarians Rising	Narrator (voice)	Main cast
2016	Secrets and Lies	Eric Warner	Main cast (season 2)
2017	Hip Hop Squares	Himself	Guest (season 3); recurring (season 4)
2018	Match Game	Himself/Celebrity Panelist	Episode: "Episode #3.11"
2017–19	Being Mary Jane	Justin Talbot	Recurring role (season 4); guest (season 5)
2019	Stumptown	Detective Miles Hoffman	Main cast
2020	Westworld	Jake Reed	Recurring role (season 3)
2020	Sherman's Showcase	Himself	Episode: "Black History Month Spectacular"
2020–21	To Tell the Truth	Himself	Panelist (seasons 5–6)
2021	Celebrity Game Face	Himself	Episode: "Caught in the Act of Mouthing Off"
2022	The $100,000 Pyramid	Himself/Celebrity Player	Episode: "Episode #6.9"
2022	The Woman in the House Across the Street from the Girl in the Window	Douglas	Main cast
2022	Bel-Air	Reid Broderick	Recurring role (season 1)
2022	A Black Lady Sketch Show	Supreme Rameek	Episode: "Save My Edges, I'm a Donor!"
2022–24	Reasonable Doubt	Damon Cooke	Main cast (season 1); guest (season 2)
2023	The Afterparty	Quentin Devereaux	Episode: "Danner's Fire"
2024	Is It Cake?	Himself/Judge	Episode: "Knock Knock...Cake Service!"
2024	Power Book II: Ghost	Detective Don Carter	Main cast (season 4)
2025	The Terminal List: Dark Wolf	Ish	Episode: "What's Past is Prologue"
2026	The Greatest	Malcolm X	Recurring role
TBA	The Magnificent Seven	Vin Tanner	Main cast

=== Music videos ===
Year	Music video	Artist	Role
2005	"Get Your Number"	Mariah Carey	Love interest of Mariah Carey
2009	"Halo"	Beyoncé Knowles	Love interest of Beyoncé
2012	"Tonight"	John Legend ft. Ludacris	Love interest of woman

== Awards and nominations ==
Year	Nominated work	Award	Category	Result
2007	Sleeper Cell	Golden Globe Awards	Best Actor – Miniseries or Television Film	Nominated
2005	Their Eyes Were Watching God	Black Reel Awards	Outstanding Actor in a Television Movie or Limited Series	Won
2010	For Colored Girls	African-American Film Critics Association	Best Supporting Actor	Won
2011	For Colored Girls	NAACP Image Awards	Outstanding Supporting Actor in a Motion Picture	Nominated
2012	Think Like a Man	Teen Choice Awards	Choice Movie Actor Romance	Nominated
