= Trois =

2000 erotic thriller film

- VHS cover
- Directed by: Rob Hardy
- Produced by: William Packer
- Starring: Gary Dourdan; Gretchen Palmer; Kenya Moore; Chrystale Wilson
- Distributed by: Rainforest Films
- Release date: March 10, 2000
- Running time: 93 minutes
- Country: United States
- Language: English
- Budget: $250,000
- Box office: $1.3 million

Trois is a 2000 erotic thriller film directed by Rob Hardy and produced by William Packer. It stars Gary Dourdan, Kenya Moore and Gretchen Palmer. The film was given a limited theatrical release and was one of the year's highest grossing African American-oriented films as well as one of the top fifty highest grossing independent films of 2000. The film was followed by two sequels, Trois 2: Pandora's Box (2002) and Trois: The Escort (2004).

== Synopsis ==
Jermaine Davis (Dourdan) is a young attorney who is newly married and has recently moved to Atlanta, Georgia with his lovely and supportive wife Jasmine (Moore). While becoming settled into the new city and job, Jermaine becomes bored with his seemingly mundane lifestyle at home. He asks his wife to engage in a ménage à trois with another woman, in order to generate more excitement within their relationship and she reluctantly agrees.

Once they've committed the act, Jermaine begins to feel the insecurities of bringing a stranger into his marriage. As a result, he attempts to sever all ties with the woman. Unfortunately, it proves more complicated to remove this person from their lives and he realizes that his curiosity has thrown him into battle with a dangerous lunatic and may cost him his marriage.

== Cast ==
- Gary Dourdan as Jermaine Davis
- Kenya Moore as Jasmine Davis
- Gretchen Palmer as Jade Owens
- Bryce Wilson as Robert
- Chrystale Wilson as Tammy
- Soloman K. Smith as Terrance/Eric
- Thom Byrd as Thomas
- Donna Biscoe as Ms. Paul

== Reception ==
The Toledo Blade gave Trois two stars, criticizing the film as not being able to decide whether it wanted to be a "serious artistic endeavor" or a "cheap thrill" and suffering as a result.

== Sequels ==
Two further films were produced in the film series, Pandora's Box and The Escort. Neither film was a direct sequel to the first film and Pandora's Box was not filmed with the intent of creating it as a part of the Trois film series. Critical reception for the second film in the series was poor.
