= Stomp the Yard: Homecoming =

- DVD cover
- Directed by: Rob Hardy
- Screenplay by: Albert Leon; Meena Payne
- Story by: Albert Leon
- Produced by: Will Packer
- Starring: Collins Pennie; Pooch Hall; Jasmine Guy; David Banner; Keith David
- Cinematography: Maz Makhani
- Edited by: Paul Millspaugh
- Music by: Todd Bozung; Peter Plath
- Production companies: Stage 6 Films; Rainforest Films; RCA Partners
- Distributed by: Sony Pictures Home Entertainment
- Release date: September 21, 2010
- Running time: 88 minutes
- Country: United States
- Language: English

Stomp the Yard: Homecoming is a 2010 American dance drama film directed by Rob Hardy and produced by Will Packer. It is the sequel to the 2007 American dance drama film Stomp the Yard. The film was released direct-to-video on September 21, 2010. Cast members include Collins Pennie, Pooch Hall, Jasmine Guy, David Banner, Terrence J and Keith David.

== Premise ==
Chance Harris looks to find a balance between his school, work, relationships and opportunity to perform at the nationally televised step competition during homecoming weekend at Truth University.

== Cast ==
- Collins Pennie as Chance Harris
- Columbus Short as DJ Williams
- Pooch Hall as Dane
- Joshua Walker as Joe
- Tika Sumpter as Nikki
- Stephen "tWitch" Boss as Taz
- Terrence J as Ty
- Kiely Williams as Brenda
- Jasmine Guy as Janice
- David Banner as Jay
- Keith David as Terry Harris
- Teyana Taylor as Rena
- Teairra Monroe as Brooke
- Lamar Stewart as Wynn
- Tyler Nelson as Bryce
- Babbal Kumar as dark dancer
- Terrence Polite as Roy
- Rickey Smiley as Finale MC
- Lil Duval as Aaron
- George "Gee" Alexander as Craig "C-Killa"
- Gregory Alan Williams as Dr. David Young

== Production notes ==
Filming began in Atlanta in November 2009.

== Soundtrack ==
The 14 tracks used in the film are:

- Ace Hood - Don't Get Caught Slippin'
- Get Cool - Go (Time to Get)
- John-John - Bounce
- Jasper Sawyer - Evil
- Mr. Robotic - We Got 'Em
- Classic - Here to Party
- G-Side - College Chicks
- Short Dawg - Get Ya Money Up
- John Forté - Nervous
- Rae ft. Basko & Nomadik - Third Degree
- Will Wreck ft. Clout Cartel - Rock Yo Body
- Get Cool - I'm Grown
- B Double E - To the Top
- Todd Bozung - Stomp Score Suite
- Roscoe Dash - Show Out
