= Baggage Claim (film) =

2013 film by David E. Talbert

- Theatrical release poster
- Directed by: David E. Talbert
- Written by: David E. Talbert
- Based on: Baggage Claim by David E. Talbert
- Produced by: David E. Talbert; Steven J. Wolfe
- Starring: Paula Patton; Derek Luke; Taye Diggs; Jill Scott; Boris Kodjoe; Trey Songz; Adam Brody; Tia Mowry; La La Anthony; Djimon Hounsou
- Cinematography: Anastas N. Michos
- Edited by: Troy Takaki
- Music by: Aaron Zigman
- Production companies: 260 Degrees; Sneak Preview Productions; Ingenious Media; Big Screen Productions
- Distributed by: Fox Searchlight Pictures
- Release date: September 27, 2013
- Running time: 96 minutes
- Country: United States
- Language: English
- Budget: $8.5 million
- Box office: $22.5 million

Baggage Claim is a 2013 American romantic comedy film written and directed by David E. Talbert, based on his 2003 novel of the same name. It stars Paula Patton, Derek Luke, Taye Diggs, Jill Scott, Adam Brody, Djimon Hounsou, Jenifer Lewis and Ned Beatty in his final film role. The film premiered on September 27, 2013.

== Plot ==
Pathologically single, 30-something, "Trans-Alliance" airline flight attendant, Montana Moore is on a mission to get her overbearing, frequently married, mother to stop pressuring her to get married. After being jilted by Graham, Seat 5C, her only prospect, Montana learns that her younger sister, Sheree, has become engaged.

Montana and her friends, Sam and Gail Best devise a plan to help her find a potential husband before Sheree's wedding. Rifling through her old contact list on her phone, the pair come up with a "prospective suitors" list. Over the course of 30 days, Montana flies all over the country (with the help of a colorful team of coworkers) hoping to reconnect with a litany of ex-boyfriends that include Langston Jefferson Battle III, a misogynistic politician, Damon Diesel, an irresponsible entertainer, and Quinton Jamison, a commitment shy multi-billionaire.

Though her quest to find a husband proves to be a disaster, Montana is oblivious to the developing romance with William Wright, her longtime best friend and next-door neighbour. On the night before the wedding, Sheree’s fiancé reveals that he does not want to get married yet and that her mother was the one who pressured him to get married with Sheree right away.

Once Montana realizes that she does not need a husband to live a fulfilling life, she finally stands up to her mother and gets her proposal from "Mr. Wright."

== Cast ==
- Paula Patton as Montana Moore
- Derek Luke as William Wright
- Taye Diggs as Langston Jefferson Battle III
- Boris Kodjoe as Graham
- Trey Songz as Damon Diesel
- Jill Scott as Gail Best
- Adam Brody as Sam
- Jenifer Lewis as Catherine Moore
- Ned Beatty as Mr. Donaldson
- Djimon Hounsou as Quinton Jamison
- Lauren London as Sheree Moore
- Christina Milian as Taylor
- Tia Mowry as Janine
- La La Anthony as Tanya
- Jim Whetstone as Chad Wilson
- Rickey Smiley as Calvin
- Terrence Jenkins as Sheree's fiancé
- Affion Crockett as Cedric
- Tyler Lepley as Curtis
- Magda Harout as Weisha

== Production ==
Stock footage of O'Hare International Airport (Chicago), Los Angeles International Airport (Los Angeles) and LaGuardia Airport (New York) along with the airlines serving these airports, were used in Baggage Claim. Scenes of the city skyscapes were extensively used to set the scene. One Boeing 737 was painted in the fictional "Trans-Alliance" airline livery. (Note: The ubiquitous Boeing737 series is the highest-selling commercial jetliner in history.) The Renaissance Schaumburg Convention Center Hotel (Chicago) is featured throughout the film. Beatty retired from acting and death in 2021.

== Reception ==
On Rotten Tomatoes the film has an approval rating of 16%, based on 82 reviews, with an average rating of 3.9/10. The site's critical consensus reads, "Baggage Claim hits the same notes as a number of successful romantic comedies without establishing much personality of its own." On Metacritic, the film has a score of 34 out of 100, based on reviews from 27 critics, indicating "generally unfavorable" reviews. Audiences surveyed by CinemaScore gave Baggage Claim an A− grade.

Owen Gleiberman of Entertainment Weekly wrote: "Paula Patton is such a terrific actress that even in the ultra-tacky romantic comedy Baggage Claim, she gives a luminous, thought-out performance, not just walking through but digging into the role of an eager, nervous doormat with a people-pleasing grin." Sheri Linden of The Hollywood Reporter wrote: "A few smart laughs hint at what might have been, but thanks to sitcom-y mugging and a tepidness beneath the intended hilarity, David E. Talbert's romantic comedy is stuck in a holding pattern for much of its running time." Peter Debruge of Variety was critical of the film, in particular writer and director David E. Talbert, saying "instead of finding a fresh spin on old cliches, he merely repeats them" and he "hasn’t quite figured out how to adjust his directing technique from stage to screen. The production values are fine in an overly bright, sitcomish way, but the actors are capable of far more than their roles call for."
