= Act Like a Lady, Think Like a Man =

2009 book by Steve Harvey

Act Like a Lady, Think Like a Man: What Men Really Think About Love, Relationships, Intimacy, and Commitment
- first edition
- Author: Steve Harvey with Denene Millner
- Language: English
- Genre: non-fiction, relationships, psychology, self-help
- Publisher: Amistad Press
- Publication date: 2009
- Publication place: United States
- Pages: 240 (first edition)
- ISBN: 9780061999574
- OCLC: 471823888

Act Like a Lady, Think Like a Man: What Men Really Think About Love, Relationships, Intimacy, and Commitment is a 2009 self-help book by Steve Harvey with Denene Millner which describes for women Harvey's concept of how men really think of love, relationships, intimacy, commitment, and how to successfully navigate a relationship with a man.

The book has been criticized for reinforcing gender stereotypes and toxic masculinity.

== Synopsis ==
In the book, Harvey instructs women on how to be a "keeper" rather than a "sports fish". He asserts that men are "simple", and that women should understand that they can never be first in a man's life without understanding and accepting that men are driven by who they are, what they do, and how much they make.

He says it's "just plain dumb" to let a man lock you into a monogamous premarital relationship, where you share a bed, bills, and even kids. The only way to convert your "committed relationship" into a marriage is to insist on setting a date for the wedding.

He writes:

The problem for all too many women who call in to my radio show, though, is that they just can't get that reciprocation from men, and women then end up feeling disappointed, disenfranchised, and disillusioned by their failed relationships.

...I teach them very quickly that expecting a man to respond to them the way a woman would is never going to work. They then realize that a clear-eyed, knowing approach to dealing with men on their terms, on their turf, in their way, can, in turn, get women exactly what they want.

== Movie tie-in ==
A feature film based on the book, titled Think Like a Man, was released by Sony Pictures' Screen Gems subsidiary on April 20, 2012. Harvey served as an executive producer on the film and made a cameo appearance as himself.

== See also ==
- Iliza Shlesinger's "Man Up and Act Like a Lady"
