= Trois 2: Pandora's Box =

- DVD cover
- Directed by: Rob Hardy
- Screenplay by: Gregory Anderson; Rob Hardy
- Story by: Gregory Anderson; Rob Hardy; William Pecker
- Produced by: William Packer
- Starring: Michael Jai White; Monica Calhoun; Kristoff St. John; Chrystale Wilson; Joey Lawrence; Tyson Beckford
- Cinematography: Matthew MacCarthy
- Edited by: Brian J. Cavanaugh
- Music by: Steven Gutheinz
- Distributed by: Rainforest Films
- Release date: August 9, 2002
- Running time: 101 minutes
- Country: United States
- Language: English
- Budget: $800,000
- Box office: $881,950

Trois 2: Pandora's Box (also known as Pandora's Box) is a 2002 erotic thriller written and directed by Rob Hardy and starring Monica Calhoun, Michael Jai White, and Kristoff St. John.

When first released, the film was known as Pandora's Box. The studio believed that it was similar in some ways to director Rob Hardy's film Trois and branded it as a franchise. Chrystale Wilson reprises her role as Tammy from Trois.

== Plot ==
A woman's infidelity leads her into a web of larceny and danger in this noir-flavored independent thriller. Mia DuBois (Monica Calhoun) is a behavioral psychologist who until recently worked with the police department, counseling the surviving victims of violent crime. While Mia has entered into a successful private practice, she's persuaded by her former colleagues to take on new client, Tammy (Chrystale Wilson), who is still dealing with the recent murder of her husband. As Mia helps Tammy with her problems, Mia finds herself thinking about her own marriage to Victor (Kristoff St. John), which has hardly been happy lately. As Mia begins wondering if she has other options, she visits a mysterious nightclub, Pandora's Box, where she meets the sexy and mysterious Hampton Hines (Michael Jai White). Mia soon begins having an affair with Hampton, unaware that Hampton is actually working with Victor and Tammy; Mia is soon to inherit $20 million, and Victor is determined to get his hands on the money. Hampton soon shifts his alliances to stay with Mia, but Victor and Tammy are not giving up their shares of the fortune quite so easily.

== Cast ==
- Monica Calhoun as Mia DuBois
- Michael Jai White as Hampton Hines
- Kristoff St. John as Victor DuBois
- Joey Lawrence as Detective Anderson
- Chrystale Wilson as Tammy Racine
- Tyson Beckford as Lance Racine

== Reception ==
The film debuted in theaters on August 9, 2002. Bringing in $85,710 from 14 cites, it opened in 38th place on the box office charts with an average gross of $6,122 per theater. Although Pandora's Box received poor reviews from critics, it was enjoyed by fans of the Trois series. The film was nominated for the Blockbuster Award for Best Feature Film and Monica Calhoun received the Best Performance by an Actress award at the 2002 American Black Film Festival. Calhoun was also nominated for Best Independent Film Actress at the 2003 Black Reel Awards.

== Sequel ==
On December 28, 2004, Columbia TriStar Home Entertainment released Trois: The Escort, the third film in the series, direct-to-video.
