= Think Like a Man =

2012 romantic comedy film

- Theatrical release poster
- Directed by: Tim Story
- Written by: Keith Merryman; David A. Newman
- Based on: Act Like a Lady, Think Like a Man by Steve Harvey
- Produced by: Will Packer
- Starring: Michael Ealy; Gary Owen; Jerry Ferrara; Meagan Good; Regina Hall; Kevin Hart; Taraji P. Henson; Terrence J; Romany Malco; Gabrielle Union
- Cinematography: Larry Blanford
- Edited by: Peter S. Elliot
- Music by: Christopher Lennertz
- Production companies: Screen Gems; Rainforest Films
- Distributed by: Sony Pictures Releasing
- Release dates: February 20, 2012 (PAFF); April 20, 2012 (United States)
- Running time: 122 minutes
- Country: United States
- Language: English
- Budget: $12 million
- Box office: $96.1 million

Think Like a Man is a 2012 American romantic comedy film directed by Tim Story, written by Keith Merryman and David A. Newman, and produced by Will Packer. It was based on Steve Harvey's 2009 book Act Like a Lady, Think Like a Man. The film stars an ensemble cast, featuring Kevin Hart, Meagan Good, Jerry Ferrara, Regina Hall, Michael Ealy, Terrence J, Taraji P. Henson, Romany Malco, Chris Brown, Gabrielle Union and Gary Owen.

The film was released on April 20, 2012, by Screen Gems. It received mixed reviews from critics, who complimented the film's humor, its soundtrack and the performances of the cast (particularly those of Good, Malco and Hart) but received criticism for being a "standard romcom". The film was a commercial success, grossing $96.1 million against a $12 million budget. A direct sequel, Think Like a Man Too, was released on June 20, 2014, with the original cast returning, to negative reviews from critics but was a moderate commercial success.

== Plot ==
The film follows four storylines, which each focus on one particular couple. They are titled:

- "The Mama's Boy" vs. "The Single Mom"
- "The Non-Committer" vs. "The Girl Who Wants the Ring"
- "The Dreamer" vs. "The Woman Who Is Her Own Man"
- "The Player" vs. "The 90 Day Rule Girl"

Each of the women are readers of Steve Harvey's book Act Like a Lady, Think Like a Man. When the men learn that the women are reliant on Harvey's advice, they try to turn the tables on their mates, which later seems to backfire.

== Cast ==
- Kevin Hart as Cedric, "The Happier Divorced Guy"
- Meagan Good as Mya, The 90 Day Rule Girl
- Taraji P. Henson as Lauren Harris, "The Woman Who Is Her Own Man"
- Terrence J as Michael Hanover, "The Mama's Boy"
- Regina Hall as Candace Hall, "The Single Mom"
- Jerry Ferrara as Jeremy Kern, "The Non-Committer"
- Gabrielle Union as Kristen, "The Girl Who Wants the Ring"
- Romany Malco as Zeke Freeman, "The Player"
- Michael Ealy as Dominic, "The Dreamer"
- Steve Harvey as himself
- Gary Owen as Bennett, "The Happily Married Man"
- Wendy Williams as Gail, Cedric's ex-wife
- Chris Brown as Alex, Mya's ex
- Keri Hilson as Heather
- Jenifer Lewis as Loretta Hanover, Michael's mom
- La La Anthony as Sonia, Mya's friend
- Caleel Harris as Duke, Candace's son
- Morris Chestnut as James Merrill, Lauren's ex
- Arielle Kebbel as Gina, Kristen's friend
- J.B. Smoove as Bartender
- Kelly Rowland as Brenda
- Sherri Shepherd as Vicki
- Tika Sumpter as Dominic's girlfriend
- Tony Rock as Xavier, Zeke's friend
- Luenell as Aunt Winnie Hall
- Jessica Camacho as Melissa
- Zach Firtel as Ryan, "The Lingerer"
- Matt Colton as Uncle Jesse, "The Ripper"
- Hayden Fein as Ash, "The Trainer"
- Andrew Ward as Runner, "The Cat"
- J. Anthony Brown as Deacon Johnson

Six professional basketball players made cameo appearances as themselves:

- Matt Barnes
- Shannon Brown
- Rasual Butler
- Darren Collison
- Lisa Leslie
- Metta World Peace

== Production ==
Principal photography began on July 1, 2011, in Los Angeles and Culver City, California, and ended on September 5.

== Reception ==
=== Critical response ===
On the review aggregator website Rotten Tomatoes, 55% of 99 critics' reviews are positive. The website's consensus reads: "In Think Like a Man, an otherwise standard rom-com is partially elevated by a committed -- and attractive -- cast, resulting in a funny take on modern romance." Metacritic, which uses a weighted average, assigned the film a score of 51 out of 100, based on 30 critics, indicating "mixed or average" reviews. Audiences surveyed by CinemaScore gave the film an average grade of "A" on an A+ to F scale.

Roger Ebert of the Chicago Sun-Times rated the film 2 stars out of 4, and wrote that a major problem with the film is that it takes seriously the advice given in the book it is based upon, commenting that such an approach "might have worked as a screwball comedy or a satire, but can you believe for a moment in characters naive enough to actually live their lives following Steve Harvey's advice? The result is a tiresome exercise that circles at great length through various prefabricated stories defined by the advice each couple needs (or doesn't need)." Ebert called the cast "superb" noting in particular the performances of Meagan Good and Kevin Hart. Owen Gleiberman of Entertainment Weekly also complimented Good and Hart's performance, as well as Romany Malco's performance. He ultimately gave the film a "B-" grade, writing that it is "so busy tracking courtship as if it were a science project that the bite-size love stories lack spontaneity." In a positive review, Michael Phillips of the Chicago Tribune commended the film for "stick[ing] to a formula without falling prey to it" and commented that "its hangout factor is considerable, because the actors' charms are considerable."

=== Box office ===
Think Like a Man grossed $91.5 million in the United States and Canada, and $4.5 million in other countries, for a worldwide total of $96.1 million, on a production budget of $12.5 million.

Think Like a Man grossed $33.7 million during its opening weekend, ending The Hunger Games' four-week run at the #1 spot at the U.S. box office. The film remained on atop the competition during its second week, bringing in $17.6 million.

=== Home media ===
Think Like a Man was released on DVD and Blu-ray on August 28, 2012, and Triple Pack includes Think Like a Man Too and About Last Night.

== Soundtrack ==
The film's soundtrack includes songs performed by numerous artists, including Kelly Rowland, Jennifer Hudson, Keri Hilson, John Legend and Future.

== See also ==
- List of black films of the 2010s
