= Terrence J =

American actor and model (born 1982)

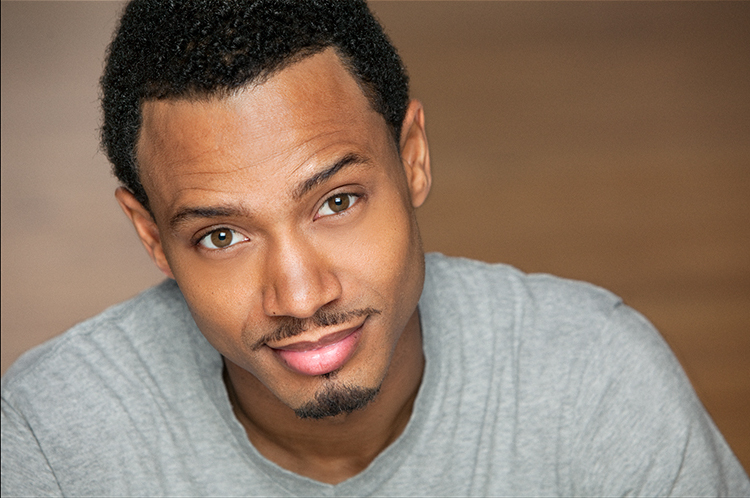
- Born: Terrence Jenkins; April 21, 1982 (age 44); Queens, New York City, U.S.
- Education: North Carolina A&T State University (BS)
- Alma mater: North Carolina A&T
- Occupations: Actor, model, journalist
- Years active: 1996–present

Terrence Jenkins (born April 21, 1982) is an American actor, television presenter, model and entertainment reporter best known as the host of BET's popular music video countdown show 106 & Park from 2006 until 2012. He was the co-anchor of E! News from 2012 until 2015.

== Early life ==
Jenkins was born in the Queens borough of New York City, and grew up mostly in Rocky Mount, North Carolina. He attended Northern Nash High in Rocky Mount. During this time, Jenkins worked at WRSV Soul 92.1 as a DJ until he graduated from high school. He spent his college years at North Carolina A&T State University; he also lived in Greensboro. During his time at North Carolina A&T State University, he served as Student Government Association President and as a DJ for North Carolina A&T's radio station WNAA. He also worked as a DJ at local radio station 102 Jamz in Greensboro. Jenkins is a member of Omega Psi Phi fraternity. He was initiated in spring 2004 into the Mu Psi chapter at North Carolina A&T State University. After graduating from North Carolina A&T State University in 2004 with a degree in mass communication, Jenkins worked in the diversity office of Nascar in Daytona Beach, Florida.

== Career ==
Jenkins and Rocsi became the hosts of BET's hip hop/R&B music video television program 106 & Park after winning the BET New Faces Contest on July 6, 2006. Since its inception, it had been the network's number-one rated show. After hosting the show for six years, Rocsi and Jenkins announced they would be leaving 106 & Park in 2012. His last show was broadcast on September 28, 2012, but returned on December 19, 2014 with the finale special, titled "The Final Act" alongside former and current hosts such as A.J. Calloway and Bow Wow. He also co-hosted BET’s nationally syndicated radio show 106 & Park Weekend Countdown.

He appeared in two films: The Heart Specialist (2006) and Stomp the Yard: Homecoming (2010). In 2008, he made a cameo appearance in British R&B singer Estelle's music video for her single with Kanye West, titled "American Boy". In 2009, Jenkins appeared on E!'s reality television series Kourtney and Khloé Take Miami, a spin-off series of Keeping Up with the Kardashians starring Kourtney and Khloé Kardashian. He co-hosted the radio show "Khloé After Dark" on Y100. Jenkins portrayed DJ Dave in the 2010 musical film Burlesque, starring Christina Aguilera and Cher. In 2011, he had a recurring role as Danté Young on the BET comedy-drama television series The Game. On September 4, 2012, Jenkins was named the co-anchor of E! News, replacing Ryan Seacrest.

Jenkins starred as Michael Hanover in the romantic comedy film Think Like a Man (2012), which grossed $96 million at the worldwide box office. He reprised his role as Michael Hanover in the film's sequel Think Like a Man Too (2014), which opened at number one at the box office, grossing $29.2 million. The film earned $70.2 million at the worldwide box office against a budget of $24 million. He also appeared in films Sparkle (2012), Baggage Claim (2013), Battle of the Year (2013) and Entourage (2015). Jenkins landed the lead role of Charlie "Mack" McIntyre in the romantic comedy film The Perfect Match (2016) opposite Cassie Ventura. The film centers around playboy Charlie, who is convinced that all his relationships are dead, but his best friends bet him that if he sticks to one woman for one month, he is bound to fall in love. Jenkins hosted Miss USA beauty pageant with Julianne Hough between 2016 and 2017.

His first book, titled "The Wealth of My Mother's Wisdom" was released by HarperCollins on October 1, 2013. The book was inspired by the lessons his mother taught him and her extraordinary journey of raising Jenkins while she was still a teenager. "I know that many of the successful moments in my life, personally and professionally, have been in part because of the lessons that she taught me, and I am proud to share her words of wisdom to inspire others," he told E! News in 2013.

Since 2017, Jenkins has hosted MTV's reality television series Are You the One? starting in season 6. Jenkins hosted 16 episodes of Starz crime drama TV series Power's official aftershow, Power Confidential. In 2019, Jenkins played for the "Home" roster during the NBA All-Star Celebrity Game at the Bojangles' Coliseum in Charlotte, North Carolina. The roster was made up of celebrities with North Carolinian roots.

== Personal life ==
He was involved in a hit-and-run incident in 2018, and was pursued and shot at by robbers in 2021. In 2025, Terrence married Mikalah Styles at The Atlantis Hotel in Dubai.

== Filmography ==
=== Film ===
Year	Title	Role	Notes
2006	Rapture	-	Short
2006	The Heart Specialist	Jenks	
2010	Stomp the Yard: Homecoming	Ty	
2010	Burlesque	Dave	
2012	Think Like a Man	Michael	
2012	Sparkle	Red	
2013	Baggage Claim	Fiance	
2013	Battle of the Year	Himself	
2013	White T	Raekwon	
2014	Think Like a Man Too	Michael	
2015	Entourage	Himself	
2016	The Perfect Match	Charlie	
2019	CIROC: What Men Want	Handsome Guy	Short
2019	Same Difference	Cameron	
2021	Hip Hop Family Christmas	Blare Nixon	TV movie
2022	North of the 10	Handsome Guy	
2022	Hip Hop Family Christmas Wedding	Blare Nixon	TV movie
2023	Fear	Russ	

=== Television ===
Year	Title	Role	Notes
1996	Savannah	Gordon	Episode: "Playing with the Enemy"
2003–06	All of Us	Omar	Guest: Season 1, Recurring Cast: Season 3
2006–12	106 & Park	Himself/Host	Main Host
2009–10	Kourtney & Khloe Take Miami	Himself	Recurring Cast: Season 1-2
2011	The Game	Dante Young	Recurring Cast: Season 4
2012	Basketball Wives	Himself	Episode: "Episode #4.9"
2013	Food Network Star	Himself	Episode: "4th of July Live"
2013	Kris	Himself/Co-Host	Episode: "Episode #1.20"
2013	Big Time Rush	TV Host	Episode: "Big Time Scandal" & "Big Time Invasion"
2013–15	E! News	Himself/Host	Main Host
2013–15	Live from the Red Carpet	Himself/Host	Recurring Host
2014	The Real Housewives of New Jersey	Himself	Episode: "Guilt Trip" & "Judgement Day"
2015	The 365Black Awards	Himself/Host	Main Host
2015	Truth Be Told	Derek	Episode: "The Wedding"
2016	Annual Trumpet Awards	Himself/Co-Host	Main Co-Host
2016	WWF SmackDown	Himself	Episode: "Episode #18.31"
2016	Coupled	Himself/Host	Main Host
2016	An Obama Celebration	Himself/Host	Main Host
2016	Hollywood Today Live	Himself/Guest Co-Host	Guest Co-Host: Season 2
2016-17	Miss USA 2016	Himself/Co-Host	Main Co-Host
2017	SafeWord	Himself/Host	Main Host
2017-19	Are You the One?	Himself/Host	Main Host: Season 6-8
2018	Hip Hop Squares	Himself/Panelist	Episode: "Lil Jon vs Lil Mama"
2018	Ridiculousness	Himself/Panelist	Episode: "Terrence J"
2018	Hit the Floor	Pastor Curtis	Recurring Cast: Season 4
2018	Star	Ryan J	Episode: "All Falls Down"
2019	Lindsay Lohan's Beach Club	Himself/VIP Guest	Episode: "Lindsay's Choice"
2019	Scream: Resurrection	Coach Griffin	Recurring Cast: Season 3
2019-20	Power Confidential	Himself/Host	Main Host
2021	The Talk	Himself/Guest Co-Host	Guest Co-Host: Season 11
2021	Celebrity Game Face	Himself	Episode: "Battle of the Bros"
2022	The Wendy Williams Show	Himself/Guest Co-Host	Guest Co-Host: Season 14

=== Documentary ===
Year	Title
2017	Chris Brown: Welcome to My Life
