= The Gospel (film) =

- Theatrical release poster
- Directed by: Rob Hardy
- Written by: Rob Hardy
- Produced by: Will Packer
- Starring: Boris Kodjoe; Idris Elba; Clifton Powell; Nona Gaye
- Cinematography: Matthew MacCarthy
- Edited by: Fernando Villena
- Music by: Stanley A. Smith
- Production company: Rainforest Films
- Distributed by: Screen Gems (through Sony Pictures Releasing)
- Release date: October 7, 2005
- Running time: 105 minutes
- Country: United States
- Language: English
- Budget: $4 million
- Box office: $15.8 million

The Gospel is a 2005 American Christian drama film directed and written by Rob Hardy. It was released in the United States by Screen Gems on October 7, 2005. The film retells the Parable of the Prodigal Son in a modern context.

== Plot ==
David, a showbiz artist, performing in nightclubs in Los Angeles, learns that his father who is pastor of an evangelical church in Atlanta is sick, and decides to go home. He learns that Frank has become the second of his father, and that he is married to Charlene. Fred announces to his son that he has a prostate cancer. David gradually abandons his old life and begins to occupy an important position in the church, which will attract Frank's jealousy.

== Cast ==
- Boris Kodjoe as David "DT" Taylor
  - Michael Pagan as Young David Taylor
- Idris Elba as Reverend Charles Frank
  - Sean Nelson as Young Charles Frank
- Clifton Powell as Bishop Fred Taylor
- Aloma Wright as Ernesteine
- Donnie McClurkin as Minister Terrence Hunter
- Nona Gaye as Charlene Taylor-Frank
- Omar Gooding as Wesley
- Tamyra Gray as Rain Walker
- Keshia Knight Pulliam as Maya Walker
- China Anne McClain as Alexis
- Sierra Aylina McClain as Sue
- Lauryn Alisa McClain as Anne
- Hezekiah Walker as Brother Gordon

=== Cameo appearances ===
- Yolanda Adams as herself
- Martha Munizzi as herself
- Fred Hammond as himself
- Kirk Franklin as himself

== Soundtrack ==
The soundtrack features the following songs:

1. He Reigns (Kirk Franklin feat. Papa San) [4:25]
2. Victory (Yolanda Adams) [4:40]
3. Glorious (Martha Munizzi) [5:59]
4. You Are Good (Greg Kirkland) [6:03]
5. Still Alive (Kirk Franklin singers) [4:27]
6. A Change Is Gonna Come (Deitrick Haddon) [5:55]
7. Ooh Child (Urban Mix) (Donnie McClurkin feat. Kirk Franklin) [3:58]
8. The Closer I Get to You (Donny Hathaway and Roberta Flack) [4:38]
9. When I Pray (Interlude) (Joann Rosario) [1:22]
10. All Things Are Working (Remix) (Fred Hammond) [5:46]
11. I Need You to Survive (Hezekiah Walker & the Love Fellowship Choir) [5:33]
12. Now Behold the Lamb (Tamyra Gray, feat. Idris Elba Serman & Clifton Powell Parable) [5:06]
13. Put Your Hands Together (Fred Hammond and Natalie Wilson) [5:01]

Total Time: 62:55

== Reception ==
=== Box office ===
Produced on a budget of US$4 million, The Gospel grossed $15.8 million at the North American box office, including $7.5 million from 969 theaters in its opening weekend.

=== Critical reception ===
According to the critic review aggregator site Rotten Tomatoes, The Gospel has an approval rating of 32% based on 37 reviews by film critics. The website's critics consensus reads, "While it features outstanding musical numbers, The Gospel reduces a series of worthy themes -- faith, family, forgiveness -- to soapy, banal clichés."

=== Accolades ===
The film received three nominations in the Black Reel Awards of 2006: Idris Elba was nominated for Best Actor, Nona Gaye was nominated for Best Actress, and Rob Hardy was nominated for Best Screenplay, Original or Adapted.
