= Trois: The Escort =

- DVD cover
- Directed by: Skav One
- Written by: Rob Hardy; Mr. Anderson
- Produced by: Dianne Ashford; Angi Bones
- Starring: Brian White; Patrice Fisher; Reagan Gomez-Preston; Isaiah Washington
- Cinematography: Matthew MacCarthy
- Edited by: David Checel
- Music by: Steven Gutheinz
- Production company: Rainforest Films
- Distributed by: Columbia TriStar Home Entertainment
- Release date: December 28, 2004
- Running time: 95 minutes
- Country: United States
- Language: English

Trois: The Escort (also known as Trois 3: The Escort) is a 2004 erotic thriller directed by Skav One and starring Brian White, Patrice Fisher, Reagan Gomez-Preston and Isaiah Washington. The film was released direct-to-DVD by Columbia TriStar Home Entertainment on December 28, 2004. It is the sequel to 2002's Trois 2: Pandora's Box and the third movie in the Trois film series.

== Synopsis ==
Trenton Meyer is an intelligent, but naive college student turned hip-hop promoter who gets a little more than what he had bargained for when a failed hip-hop concert goes south. Trent turns to the world of male prostitution to pay what he owes to an underworld figure. Meanwhile, in this life of prostitution, he falls for a colleague, who turns out to be a femme fatale.

== Cast ==
- Brian White as Trenton "Trent" Meyer
- Patrice Fisher as Kyria Bynam
- Reagan Gomez-Preston as Lena
- Isaiah Washington as Bernard "Benny" Grier
- Bone Crusher as Cognac
- Donna Biscoe as Patricia Meyer
- Lou Walker as Wendell Meyer
