= Kiki Haynes =

American actress

- Born: Kianya Haynes; December 17, 1976 (age 49); Livingston, New Jersey, U.S.
- Occupation: Actress
- Years active: 1997–present
- Parent(s): Reginald Haynes; Oona'o Haynes

Kianya Haynes (born December 17, 1976) is an American actress who is best known for role as Keisha on the OWN/TBS comedy-drama television series Tyler Perry's For Better or Worse. She has also had roles in the films Bamboozled (2000), Nora's Hair Salon (2004) and Restraining Order (2006).

== Career ==
Her first acting role was a small part in Spike Lee's Bamboozled (2000), which starred Damon Wayans and Jada Pinkett-Smith. She followed that with a small part in the 2004 comedy Nora's Hair Salon appearing alongside Jenifer Lewis and Tatyana Ali. Haynes' first break came in 2007 when she landed the lead role of Nicole Lawson in the stage play The Bachelorette Party by Donald Welch and in association with Will Smith. She gained other roles for different projects including Restraining Order (2006) and Double Duty (2009).

However, Kiki's big break came in 2011 after landing her starring role in Tyler Perry's For Better or Worse. Haynes plays Keisha Jones, single mother and ex-girlfriend to Marcus Williams (played by Michael Jai White). She is also newly wed to Richard Ellington, played by Kent Faulcon which causes quite a tension as Richard and Marcus are former college buddies and business partners. On November 9, 2011, she was nominated for Supporting Actress in a comedy at the 43rd NAACP Image Awards.

== Personal life ==
Kiki was born in Livingston, New Jersey, the daughter of Reginald Haynes, leader of the R&B singing group The Legendary Escorts, and Oona'o Haynes, a spoken word artist and founding member of the National Association of Black Journalists.

Kiki grew up in East Orange, New Jersey with her only sibling, Alethia Pierson. Her curiosity to seek a career as an actress began as a very young girl as she watched both her parents perform on stage. Once she joined the drama club at her middle school, Hart Middle, at the age of 10, she entered the drama competition and won the best actress award amongst 6th graders. That win awarded Kiki with a trip to visit the set of The Cosby Show, where she met Bill Cosby, Phylicia Rashad, Malcolm Jamal Warner and the rest of the cast. It was that monumental moment she realized she too one day would be on a set of her own, starring in a TV Show.

== Filmography ==
=== Film ===
Year	Title	Role	Notes
1997	Rules of Engagement	Receptionist	TV movie
2000	Bamboozled	Da Bomb Girl	
2003	Cutthroat Alley	Gil's Girl	
2004	Nora's Hair Salon	Kiki	
2006	Restraining Order	Tammy Smith	
2006	Rings	Janelle	Short
2006	A Different Light	Misty Law	Short
2007	Tournament of Dreams	Shirley	
2008	Shattered!	Bartender	
2009	No Complaints	Jenn	
2009	Double Duty	Lilly	
2010	My Girlfriend's Back	Zoe	
2010	Cream Soda	Lilly	Video
2012	Redemption of a Dog	Angela	
2014	Love the One You're With	Miki	TV movie
2015	My First Love	Kareena	Video
2017	The Lost Souls Cafe	Pam	TV movie
2017	Message from a Mistress	Renee Clinton	
2018	Before You Say I Do Live!	Tori	
2019	Intern-in-Chief	Camille	
2020	Matched	Porscha Turner	TV movie
2021	Lost and found	Eve	Short

=== Television ===
Year	Title	Role	Notes
2005	Barbershop	Woman in audience	Episode: "Debates and Dead People"
2011–17	For Better or Worse	Ro'Keisha Jones	Recurring cast: season 1, main cast: season 2-6
2012	Rules of Engagement	Receptionist	Episode: "Goodbye Dolly"
2014	One Love	Waitress	Episode: "Tea-Ball"
2018	Ladies of the Law	Miranda	Main cast
2019	Family Time	Raquel Madison	Episode: "Bro Code"
2020	Two Degrees	Kiki	Episode: "Dessert & Down From There"
2021–present	All the Queen's Men	Detective Davis	Recurring cast
2021	Twenties	Cocoa	Episode: "One Night Only?"
