= College Hill (TV series) =

Reality television series

- Genre: Reality
- Starring: Willie Macc; Dorion Renaud; Kendrick Gooden; Ja'ron Thompson; Vanessa Hamilton; Krystal Lee; Idesha Browne; Devon Luis; Andres Kitts; Fallon Favors
- Country of origin: United States
- Original language: English
- No. of seasons: 6
- No. of episodes: 94

Production
- Producers: Tracey Edmonds; Kenneth Edmonds
- Running time: 30 minutes

Original release
- Network: BET
- Release: January 28, 2004 – June 23, 2009

Related
- College Hill: Celebrity Edition

College Hill is an American reality television series that followed the lives of students at historically black colleges. It originally aired on BET from 2004 to 2009. It returned as College Hill: Celebrity Edition on June 27, 2022 on BET+.

== Release ==
The first season began airing on January 28, 2004 and aired every Tuesday at 10pm on BET. The show's ratings increased dramatically during the course of the series, bringing in record ratings during its third and fourth seasons for BET. The sixth and final season, set in South Beach, Florida, premiered on March 24, 2009.

A celebrity edition of the series premiered on June 27, 2022 with eight episodes on the network's streaming service BET+.

== Episodes ==
=== Season 1 (2004) ===
The first season premiered on January 28, 2004 and followed the lives of eight students at Southern University—Kinda Andrews, Shalondrea Davis, Gabriel Langley, Kevin Mack, Delano Mitchell, Nina Moch, Veronica Moss and Jabari Roberts. The season has never been released on DVD.

No. overall	No. in season	Title	Original release date
1	1	"Southern University at Baton Rouge"	January 28, 2004
2	2	"Episode 2"	February 4, 2004
3	3	"Episode 3"	February 11, 2004
4	4	"Episode 4"	February 18, 2004
5	5	"Episode 5"	February 25, 2004
6	6	"Episode 6"	March 3, 2004
7	7	"Episode 7"	March 10, 2004
8	8	"Episode 8"	March 17, 2004
9	9	"Episode 9"	March 24, 2004
10	10	"Episode 10"	March 31, 2004
11	11	"Episode 11"	April 7, 2004
12	12	"Episode 12"	April 14, 2004
13	13	"Episode 13"	April 21, 2004

=== Season 2 (2005) ===
The second season premiered on January 27, 2005 and followed the lives of eight students at Langston University — Nafiys Blakewood, Coti Farley, Israel Jacobs, Peaches Jaspar, Brittani Lewis, Stacey Stephens, Tanisha Taylor and Jon Walker. Peaches was removed from the house halfway through filming, due to a violent altercation with Jon. The season has never been released on DVD.

No. overall	No. in season	Title	Original release date
14	1	"Episode 1"	January 27, 2005
15	2	"Boogie Night"	February 3, 2005
16	3	"Who's Got Game"	February 10, 2005
17	4	"Episode 4"	February 17, 2005
18	5	"Episode 5"	February 24, 2005
19	6	"Episode 6"	March 2, 2005
20	7	"Episode 7"	March 9, 2005
21	8	"Episode 8"	March 16, 2005
22	9	"Episode 9"	March 23, 2005
23	10	"Episode 10"	March 30, 2005
24	11	"Episode 11"	April 6, 2005
25	12	"Episode 12"	April 13, 2005
26	13	"Episode 13"	April 20, 2005

=== Season 3 (2006) ===
The third season premiered on March 2, 2006 and followed the lives of eight students at Virginia State University — Audrina Clyde, Ray Cunningham, Will Grishaw, Rodney Henry, Anya Holland, Bianca Olivo, Deirdra Tyrone-Davis and Arlando Whitaker.

=== Season 4 (2007) ===
The fourth season premiered on March 6, 2007 and followed the lives of eight students at the University of the Virgin Islands — Idesha Browne, Fallon Favors, Vanessa Hamilton, Krystal Lee, and Willie Macc. Vanessa was removed from the house half way through filming, after attacking Krystal.

=== Season 5 (2008) ===
The fifth season premiered on March 11, 2008 and followed the lives of eight students in Atlanta. This season featured students from different colleges around the Atlanta area like Clark Atlanta University, Morehouse College, and Georgia State University.

On March 4, 2008, BET aired a special, College Hill: Class Reunion, hosted by Big Tigger. It featured cast members from the third and fourth seasons, as well as the Interns spin-off.

=== Season 6 (2009) ===
The sixth season premiered on March 24, 2009 and followed the lives of eight students in South Beach. Terri was voted off the show half way through filming, after an altercation with Milan.

== College Hill: Interns ==
In the fall of 2007, BET aired College Hill Interns, a spin-off focusing on the lives of ten college students from different universities around the country on their summer internship program in Chicago—Letia, Lonnie Abernathy, Jenna Bailey, Tatiana Boiser, Ivy Box, Kathy Harris, Spencer Humphries, Marc Reece and Kasheef Wizard.

== College Hill: Celebrity Edition ==
A celebrity revival premiered in June 2022 on BET+.

== Ratings ==
College Hill has posted some record numbers for BET. During Season 4 (The Virgin Island Season), episode 8 was the most-watched original series telecast in BET history, pulling in a 1.84 rating averaging 2.2 million viewers. It was cable's #1 original series among Black households (6.5 US Black Rating) and Blacks 18–34 (5.3 US Blacks 18-34 Rating) for Calendar Year 2007.

== Home media ==
College Hill DVDs were released through Paramount. The DVDs include bonus episodes, footage that didn't make the show, and cast commentaries.

Season #	Season name	DVD release date
1	Southern University	Not Released
2	Langston University	Not Released
3	Virginia State University	September 25, 2006
4	University of the Virgin Islands	July 17, 2007
5	Atlanta	August 19, 2008
6	South Beach	September, 2009

== Criticism ==
As with other reality shows, College Hill has received criticism from the black community.

During its second season, some associated with Langston University made some complaints about the way the university, and black college students as a whole, were represented by the show. "We are not denying this type of thing goes on," David Stevens, national president of the Langston University Alumni Association, had said, "but we are questioning what are the motives behind presenting many of the negative aspects without showing the good that goes on." Hudspeth said the show presents stereotypical images of black people. He likened BET to minstrel shows of the early 20th century. "BET represents the merchandising and exploitation of stereotypical and oftentimes destructive behavior of black people for the benefit of profit", he said.

Virginia State University, the show's location for the third season, saw a drop in enrollment the following year. While there was a 2 percent increase in out-of-state students, from 1,483 to 1,529, the number of in-state students declined, from 3,572 to 3,343, according to the university's Web site.

During its fourth season in the Virgin Islands, it caused an uproar. Alumni and parents sent e-mails and called the university. Radio shows aired discontent over the way the students portrayed themselves. Members of the university's board of trustees expressed their outrage over the cast members' behavior and distanced themselves from the decision to allow the show to be filmed at UVI. They advised President LaVerne E. Ragster to apologize to both the university and Virgin Islands communities, which she did in full-page advertisements in the Virgin Islands Daily News and the St. Croix Avis. A board member even at the university stated "I was absolutely horrified by the program. A public university has a role to educate the public as much as its students and not highlight modern society's base instincts," he was quoted as saying. Others on campus also felt College Hill did not accurately represent Virgin Islands students.

Cast member Idesha Browne from the Virgin Island season stated that "everyone has to take into consideration that this is TV." In the first two episodes, there were displays of nudity and profanity, and sexual overtones. Cast members drank until becoming sick, and dared each other to become nude and to perform sexual acts. According to Browne, many of the negative comments came because of "the timeline of the show". She said that scenes, specifically those in the first episodes, were not shown chronologically. "They had to put things together to make the audience watch the show," Browne said. "A lot of negative comments that are made are about the timeline. People think everything happened so fast but those who lived in the house know how it happened," she said. "The show isn't about UVI. It's about eight students who live in a house and attend UVI."

"I don't regret anything. If I could do it again I probably would do it", cast member Browne said. She said she was happy for the opportunity to refine her speaking skills and the interaction with others. This may be why, starting with the fifth season, College Hill is named after a city rather than a university. The Season also received backlash for sexual assault and homophobia. Cast member Dorion Renaud spoke about criticism he faced after doing the show from Hollywood directors and producers and unfair compensation on The Breakfast Club.

== See also ==
- Reality television
- BET
- Baldwin Hills
- Harlem Heights
- The Real World
