= Games People Play (2019 TV series) =

2019 American sports drama series

- Genre: Sports drama
- Created by: Vanessa Middleton
- Based on: Games Divas Play by Angela Burt-Murray
- Starring: Lauren London; Sarunas J. Jackson; Parker McKenna Posey; Karen Obilom; Jackie Long; Kendall Kyndall; Karrueche Tran; Brandi Denise
- Country of origin: United States
- Original language: English
- No. of seasons: 2
- No. of episodes: 20

Production
- Executive producers: Tracey Edmonds; Angela Burt-Murray; Vanessa Middleton; Kim Newton; Jazmyne Davis
- Running time: 40–41 min.
- Production companies: Edmonds Entertainment; STX Entertainment

Original release
- Network: BET
- Release: April 23, 2019 – December 21, 2021

Games People Play is an American drama television series, created by Vanessa Middleton, based on the novel Games Divas Play written by Angela Burt-Murray, that premiered on April 23, 2019, on BET.

On November 13, 2019, the series was renewed for a second season, which premiered on October 19, 2021.

== Premise ==
Games People Play takes place "inside the high-stakes world of professional sports where everyone plays to win. With an ensemble cast of dynamic characters including an ambitious reporter, a millionaire basketball player, a desperate housewife, a scandalous groupie, and a murderous stalker, the series follows three women Nia, Vanessa and Laila and the men in their lives. In a ruthless battle for success, these women's passions and motivations are seldom altruistic, but their life choices and drive will determine what it really takes to stay on top."

== Cast ==
=== Main ===
- Lauren London as Vanessa King
- Karen Obilom as Nia Bullock, Vanessa's closest friend and confidente
- Parker McKenna Posey as Laila James
- Sarunas Jackson as Marques King, a professional basketball all star, who played for New York Gladiators, but traded to the Los Angeles Vipers, is married to Vanessa
- Jackie Long as Kareem Johnson, Marcus' best friend and assistant, who was a former basketball star for the Gladiators and a college basketball standout
- Kendall Kyndall as Marquis "MJ" Jackson, Nia's assistant and best friend (season 2; recurring season 1)
- Karrueche Tran as Eden Lazlo, the daughter of the Los Angeles Vipers owner and the newly named VP of basketball operations, who further complicates Marcus' love life (season 2)
- Gail Bean as Quanisha

=== Recurring ===
- Barry Brewer as Eric Rowland, Nia's live-in boyfriend, an IT nerd who is a basketball all-star captain
- Morgan Walsh as Ginger Gates
- Monti Washington as Terrence Abrams
- Shaun Robinson as Kristen Kensington
- Rachel Leyco as Susie Q (A.K.A. Natasha), Laila's friend
- Ryan Paevey as Bryce Daniels, a Los Angeles Vipers fan
- Kevin McNamera as Coach Kelly Buxton, a coach
- Kevin Jackson as Jamal "The Criminal" Jerome, a thief and a drug dealer
- Vanessa Bell Calloway as Shelia
- Vanessa Simmons as Jackie Herman
- Alfredo Tavares as Keaun Stevenson, the coach for the Los Angeles Vipers
- Delvon Roe as Dante Herman, a college basketball player, professional basketball player and the husband of Jackie
- Phillip G. Carlson as Detective Anderson Loomis
- Ismeli Henriquez as Kalinda Walters
- Jack Merrill as Detective Frank Thrillin
- Tracy Melchior as Roxanne
- Chinedu Oji as Ceawen Maduenu, a basketball player for the Tulsa Tornado
- Momo Dione as Atebe Sekibo, a Nigerian Gangster
- Lourdes Gonzalez as Merlot
- Gail Bean as Quanisha
- Ben Shields as Gus, a reporter
- Mike Bash as Tony, a sports reporter
- Jerry Cummings (Frvrose) as Himothy "He-Man" Taylor, a basketball player for the Austin Stallions, traded to the LA Vipers
- Cynthia Bailey as Ndasia
- Ro Parrish as himself, a Vipers' NBA Commentator.
- Hitman Holla as Romello "Rome", the new cocky point guard traded to the Vipers
- Leon as Walter, Marques father
- Calvin Seabrooks as Andre, a successful ex from MJ's past
- Marlo Hampton as Monique, a friend of Vanessa King

=== Guest ===
Partial list of guest by last name:

- Anisha Adusumilli as Anushka
- Terrah Bennett Smith as Rosalind Jackson
- Jennie Fahn as Janet, Vanessa's lawyer
- Giana Garcia as Deja
- Blaine Gray as Cameron Pike, a basketball player
- Jamaal Lewis as Handsom Manny
- John A. Lorenz as ADA Martin Escovedo
- Nazanin Mandi as Zara, wife to new Viper player Tyreck
- Aaron Marshall as Theodore Delano
- Alveraz Ricardez as Officer Mel Friendly
- Jeremie Rivers as Jebediah Hawthorne, a reverend
- Ron J. Rock as Jason Brown, a basketball player
- Greice Santo as Yoga Nanny
- Owen Saxon as Thomas, a trainer and a basketball player for the Los Angeles Vipers
- Marie Stark as Deanna George
- Norman Towns as Tyreck Woolridge, a basketball player for the Tulsa Tornado
- Shabnam Yusufzai as Ana Reyes, a housekeeper
- Zach Zublena as Jasper White, a basketball player for the Tulsa Tornado

== Episodes ==
=== Series overview ===
Season	Episodes	Originally released	
Season	Episodes	First released	Last released
1	10	April 23, 2019	June 25, 2019
2	10	October 19, 2021	December 21, 2021

=== Season 1 (2019) ===
No. overall	No. in season	Title	Directed by	Written by	Original release date	U.S. viewers (millions)
1	1	"Pilot"	Janice Cooke	Vanessa Middleton	April 23, 2019	0.76
2	2	"Lover's Moon"	Rob Morrow	Kim Newton	April 30, 2019	0.53
3	3	"The Drink of Kings"	Rob Morrow	Stephen Godchaux	May 7, 2019	0.37
4	4	"The Wrath of Grapes"	Michael Grossman	Mike Flynn	May 14, 2019	0.46
5	5	"To Live and Lie in LA"	Michael Grossman	Theodore Witcher	May 21, 2019	0.38
6	6	"Reversal of Fortune"	Janice Cooke	Sara Finney-Johnson	May 28, 2019	0.51
7	7	"Persons of Interests"	Rob Morrow	Vanessa Middleton & Sara Finney-Johnson	June 4, 2019	0.40
8	8	"A Wing and a Prayer"	Rob Morrow	Story by : Vanessa Middleton; Teleplay by : Meagan Diane	June 11, 2019	0.41
9	9	"The B' is Back"	Janice Cooke	Theodore Witcher	June 18, 2019	0.41
10	10	"The Way You Save"	Janice Cooke	Vanessa Middleton	June 25, 2019	0.58

=== Season 2 (2021) ===
No. overall	No. in season	Title	Directed by	Written by	Original release date	U.S. viewers (millions)
11	1	"I Saw What You Did"	Rob Morrow	Vanessa Middleton	October 19, 2021	0.48
12	2	"Gone Girl"	Rob Morrow	Theodore Witcher	October 26, 2021	0.50
13	3	"Love and Basketball"	Rob Morrow	Ben Cory Jones	November 2, 2021	0.46
14	4	"Lost and Found"	Rob Morrow	Sara Finney-Johnson	November 9, 2021	0.48
15	5	"All In"	Rob Morrow	Meagan Daine	November 16, 2021	0.45
16	6	"The Game Catches Everyone"	Rob Morrow	Phonz Williams	November 23, 2021	0.51
17	7	"There's No Place Like Home"	Courtney Miller	Theodore Witcher	November 30, 2021	0.56
18	8	"Undercover Brother"	Rob Morrow	Vanessa Middleton & Meagan Daine	December 7, 2021	0.48
19	9	"Truth and Consequences"	Rob Morrow	Sara Finney-Johnson	December 14, 2021	0.57
20	10	"The Greater Good"	Rob Morrow	Vanessa Middleton	December 21, 2021	0.52

== Production ==
=== Development ===
On April 17, 2018, it was announced that BET had the production a series order for a first season consisting of ten episodes. Executive producers were set to include Tracey Edmonds, Angela Burt-Murray, and Vanessa Middleton, who was also expected to act as showrunner. Production companies involved with the series were slated to consist of Edmonds Entertainment. On December 6, 2018, it was reported that Middleton would write the pilot episode of the series and serve as a co-showrunner alongside Kim Newton, who will also executive produce. On January 31, 2019, it was announced that the series had been retitled Games People Play. On April 1, 2019, it was announced that the series will premiere on April 23, 2019.

On November 13, 2019, the series was renewed for a second season, which premiered on October 19, 2021.

=== Casting ===
On December 6, 2018, it was announced that Lauren London, Parker McKenna Posey, and Karen Obilom had been cast in leading roles. On January 31, 2019, it was reported that Sarunas J. Jackson and Jackie Long had joined the main cast and that Barry Brewer and Kendall Kyndall would appear in a recurring capacity.

On September 10, 2020, it was announced that Karrueche Tran will join the series for Season 2. It was also announced that Lauren London will appear in a limited role and Kendall Kyndall will join the main cast.

=== Filming ===
Principal photography for the series commenced on November 29, 2018, in Los Angeles, California.
