= The Perfect Match (2016 film) =

2016 American romantic comedy film by Bille Woodruff

- Theatrical release poster
- Directed by: Bille Woodruff
- Written by: Brandon Broussard; Gary Hardwick; Dana Verde
- Produced by: Yanelley Arty; Alex Avant; Johnson Chan; Shakim Compere; Douglas Shaffer
- Starring: Terrence J; Cassie Ventura; Donald Faison; Dascha Polanco; Robert Christopher Riley; Lauren London; Joe Pantoliano; Paula Patton
- Cinematography: Tommy Maddox-Upshaw
- Edited by: Michael Jablow
- Music by: Kurt Farquhar
- Production companies: CodeBlack Films; Jorva Entertainment Productions; Flavor Unit Entertainment
- Distributed by: Lionsgate
- Release dates: March 7, 2016 (Hollywood); March 11, 2016 (United States)
- Running time: 96 minutes
- Country: United States
- Language: English
- Budget: $5 million
- Box office: $11.4 million

The Perfect Match is a 2016 American romantic comedy film directed by Bille Woodruff. The film was written by Dana Verde, Brandon Broussard and Gary Hardwick and stars Terrence J, Cassie Ventura, Lauren London and Paula Patton. It was released on March 11, 2016.

== Plot ==
Charlie is a playboy who's convinced that relationships are dead even though his sister, a therapist, tries to tell him otherwise. His best friends bet him that if he sticks to one woman for one month, he's bound to fall in love. Charlie takes the bet because he believes that he's immune to love, until he meets the beautiful and mysterious Eva. Charlie coaxes Eva into a casual affair but soon finds out that she has turned the tables on him, after realizing he wants a bit more from their relationship.

== Cast ==
- Terrence J as Charlie "Mack" McIntyre
- Cassie Ventura as Eva
- Donald Faison as Rick
- Dascha Polanco as Pressie
- Robert Christopher Riley as Victor
- Lauren London as Ginger
- Joe Pantoliano as Marty
- Paula Patton as Sherry McIntyre
- French Montana as Himself
- Brandy Norwood as Avatia
- Beau Casper Smart as Abram
- Timothy DeLaGhetto as Himself
- Robin Givens as Geneva
- Kali Hawk as Karen
- Draya Michele as Holly
- DeJuan Renfroe as Raymond
- Candice Craig as Cindy
- Layla Jama as Dana
- Chantel Jeffries as Fawn
- Anzu Lawson as Sophia
- Jessica White as Tammi
- Eugena Washington as Gena

== Production ==
The film was first announced in July 2015, with director Bille Woodruff, which was being produced independently by Queen Latifah's company, Flavor Unit Entertainment. It was also revealed Terrence Jenkins, Paula Patton, Kali Hawk and Joe Pantoliano had joined the cast. Jorva Entertainment Prods. would be fully financing the film and co-producing with Flavor Unit. Written by Dana Verde, Gary Hardwick and Brandon Broussard, the film explores "what happens when a successful playboy meets his match." Latifah, Jenkins, Patton were also producing along with Shakim Compere, Alex Avant, Yaneley Arty, Douglas Shaffer and Jorva president Johnson Chan. Principal photography on The Perfect Match began around late June 2015 in Los Angeles.

== Home media ==
The film was released on DVD and Blu-ray on July 19, 2016.

Special features

- "Making The Perfect Match" Featurette
- "What’s Love Without Comedy" Featurette
- "Nobody's Perfect" Featurette
- Chillin' with the Perfect Cast – Cast & Director Commentary

== Reception ==
=== Box office ===
In the United States and Canada, the film opened on March 11, 2016, alongside 10 Cloverfield Lane, The Brothers Grimbsy and The Young Messiah, and was projected to gross $5–6 million from 925 theaters in its opening weekend. It grossed $1.6 million on its first day and $4.2 million over the weekend, finishing 6th at the box office but second among new releases. Forbes called the opening "halfway decent" and qualifying it overall as "not quite a win but not really a disaster either"; 80% of opening weekend audience members were over 25 years old, while 66% were women. Indiewire reported the film was set to have a limited foreign release. The Perfect Match grossed over $11 million worldwide.

=== Critical response ===
On Rotten Tomatoes the film has an approval rating of 22% based on 18 reviews, with an average rating of 4.29/10. On Metacritic the film has a weighted average score of 41 out of 100, based on 8 critics, indicating "mixed or average reviews". Audiences polled by CinemaScore gave the film a grade of "B" on an A+ to F scale.

In his review for TheWrap, Alonso Duralde found the film uneven, and it "doesn’t even provide the comfort-food delights of a well-made formulaic genre film. Neither the central romance, nor the movie around it, ever catches fire." Writing for RogerEbert.com, Sheila O'Malley gave the film 2.5/4 stars, calling it predictable but semi-charming. Dave Palmer of The Reel Deal gave the film 4/10, but admitted he had fun watching it because of how stupid it is. In a positive review for The New York Times, Glenn Kenny commented, "the movie sticks to its philosophical guns, such as they are, in a way that’s almost unheard of in contemporary romantic comedies."

== See also ==
- List of black films of the 2010s
