= For Better or Worse (2011 TV series) =

American television sitcom (2011–2017)

- Also known as: Tyler Perry's For Better or Worse
- Genre: Sitcom
- Created by: Tyler Perry
- Based on: Characters by Tyler Perry
- Written by: Tyler Perry
- Directed by: Tyler Perry
- Starring: Tasha Smith; Michael Jai White; Crystle Stewart; Jason Olive; Kiki Haynes; Kent Faulcon; Cocoa Brown; Brad James; Chandra Currelley; Bobb'e J. Thompson
- Country of origin: United States
- Original language: English
- No. of seasons: 6
- No. of episodes: 162 (list of episodes)

Production
- Executive producers: Tyler Perry; Ozzie Areu
- Camera setup: Multiple
- Running time: 22 to 24 minutes
- Production company: Tyler Perry Studios

Original release
- Network: TBS (2011–2012) (seasons 1–2); OWN (2013–2017) (seasons 3–6)
- Release: November 25, 2011 – July 22, 2017

Related
- Why Did I Get Married? (2007 film); Why Did I Get Married Too? (2010 film)

For Better or Worse is an American television sitcom created, written and executive produced by Tyler Perry. The series is based on and is a TV spin-off to Perry's 2007 film Why Did I Get Married? and its 2010 sequel Why Did I Get Married Too? The show premiered on November 25, 2011 and aired on TBS for two seasons.

In 2013, OWN ordered a third season, which premiered on September 18, 2013. The show ran for three additional seasons on OWN.

== Production ==
TBS announced the straight-to-series order of For Better or Worse on April 26, 2011, the same day it was announced that House of Payne would be ending after its sixth season. Unlike House of Payne and Meet the Browns, which are family-oriented, For Better Or Worse targets young adults. The premiere episode of the series acquired 3.33 million viewers, bringing the show to the top of the charts as basic cable's No. 1 comedy series for the month of October 2011.

In February 2012, TBS announced the thirty-five episode second season renewal, which premiered on July 13, 2012, with the first season averaging 2.9 million viewers. For Better or Worse was also basic cable's No. 1 sitcom of 2011 and the No. 1 show on all of television with African-American adults in the same year.

TBS declined to renew the series. In February 2013, Oprah Winfrey Network (which had entered into a development deal with Perry) ordered a third season. The third season of the series premiered on September 18, 2013. The second part of season 3 premiered on April 9, 2014. The third part of season 3 premiered on September 17, 2014. The fourth season of the series premiered on Friday, March 27, 2015. The second half of season 4 premiered on September 11, 2015. The fifth season of the series premiered on April 1, 2016. The second half of season 5 premiered on September 30. On January 30, 2017 OWN announced that the show would end after the sixth season. The sixth season premiered on Saturday, June 10, 2017. The series ended on July 22, 2017. The series had a total of 162 episodes.

== Cast ==
- Tasha Smith as Angela Williams: Marcus's sparkplug of a wife, the affluent and successful owner of Lady Angie's hair salon and hair care products; originally from Camden, New Jersey, she has a degree in chemistry. In season 1, Angela deals with Marcus's infidelity issues. Marcus tries prove his innocence. It was confirmed in the season 2 premiere. She has hatred for Marcus's ex-girlfriend Keisha throughout the entire series. In season 3, Angela finds out that she has cancer, caused by a mass in her mammogram, but later is misdiagnosed. In the season 4 episode "The Results", Angela finds out she is pregnant, but later in the season 6 premiere, she had suffered a miscarriage.
- Michael Jai White as Marcus Williams: Angela's husband, a former professional football player and owner of a highly rated sports television show C-Sports Now. Season 1 focuses on his infidelity struggles with Angela, Marcus proves his innocence and it was confirmed at the beginning of season 2. In season 4, he unknowingly fathered another child. In the season 4 episode, "The Results", Marcus finds out his wife, Angela is pregnant and is expecting his third child. In the 2007 film, Marcus was working for Angela before owning his sport business.
- Jason Olive as Joseph Jetson: Marcus's partner at C-Sports Now, and best friend since college, a former tennis player and Leslie's husband-to-be. Towards the end of season 2, he and Leslie break up over their sexual attraction with each other and feelings for marriage, but still has feelings for her and determines to win her back throughout season 3. In the season 2 finale, Joseph suffers from a motorcycle accident on Leslie and Chris's wedding day trying to stop it. In season 3, they get back together. And in season, Joseph finally proposes to Leslie.
- Crystle Stewart as Leslie Morris: Angela's best friend since college, a real estate agent and Joseph Jetson's fiancée. Leslie has doubts about her and Joseph's relationship in Season 2. Towards the end of season 2, Leslie breaks off her relationship with Joseph; she later becomes attracted to former high-school friend Chris. Chris proposes to Leslie, and they get married in the season 2 finale and the season 3 premiere. In season 3 while married to Chris, Leslie begins to have conflicted feelings for Joseph, especially after learning of his motorcycle accident. When Chris learns of this, they divorce.
- Kent Faulcon as Richard Ellington: Marcus's partner and CFO at C-Sports Now, and other best friend since college, previously dated Marcus' assumed babymama Keisha; a former baseball player. After finding out what kind of person she really was, Richard broke up with Keisha. While dealing with the divorce, Richard has anger management issues with Keisha in season 4. In season 5, he is dating Jennifer.
- Cocoa Brown as Jennifer: Angela's comedic best friend from childhood, also from Camden, New Jersey and stylist at Lady Angie's. She has two kids. In season 2, she has a scare and finds out that she may have HIV but tests negative. In season 5, she starts developing feelings for Richard.
- Bobb'e J. Thompson as Marcus "M.J." Williams, Jr (Seasons 1–2): Marcus and Angela's son.
- Brad James as Todderick "Todd" Andrews: intern at C-Sports Now who can be a good and irritating friend to Marcus, Joseph, and Richard. a former baseball player. In season three, Todd learns that he fathered a child with a woman named Shawn.
- Chandra Currelley as Miss V (Seasons 1–2, 4–6; Guest Season 3): Marcus and Angela's housekeeper.
- Kiki Haynes as Ro'Keisha Jones (Seasons 2–6; recurring Season 1): Marcus's troublesome ex-girlfriend, who ignites bitter feuds with Angela throughout the series. She dated Richard Ellington and has a degree in accounting. They married and then divorced. In season 4, after the divorce settlement, Keisha is working with Marcus, Joseph, Richard, and Todd at C-Sports Now. Kaira Whitehead originally portrayed Keisha in the 2007 film.

=== Recurring ===
- Teka Brandon as Dominique Williams (Season 1–3): Keisha's daughter, believed to be Marcus's daughter until Season 2.
- Jermaine L. Brantley (Season 1) and Cedric Stewart (Season 2) as Tyrik: contractor and Angela's old flame from college.
- Rhyon Nicole Brown as Pam (Season 4): Marcus's 17-year-old daughter, who he unknowingly fathered.
- Dorsey Levens as Benny (Season 6): Marcus's ex-teammate and friend who once shared an intimate past with Angela and still has feelings for her.

== Episodes ==
Season	Episodes		Originally released		
Season	Episodes		First released	Last released	Network
1	10		November 25, 2011	December 23, 2011	TBS
2	35		July 13, 2012	December 7, 2012	TBS
3	55	26	September 18, 2013	December 11, 2013	OWN
3	55	15	April 9, 2014	June 11, 2014	OWN
3	55	14	September 17, 2014	December 17, 2014	OWN
4	22	11	March 27, 2015	June 5, 2015	OWN
4	22	11	September 11, 2015	October 16, 2015	OWN
5	20	10	April 1, 2016	May 27, 2016	OWN
5	20	10	September 30, 2016	November 25, 2016	OWN
6	20		June 10, 2017	July 22, 2017	OWN

== Reception ==
For Better or Worse received generally mixed reviews from critics. The Boston Herald described it as being "an upscale Dynasty crossed with Who's Afraid of Virginia Woolf? with a dash of urban sass", which "knocks you back with a bracing dose of its characters’ resentments and rages." Joshua Alston of The A.V. Club felt that For Better or Worse felt more "mature" and less "over-the-top" than Perry's other programs (comparing it, in particular, to BET's The Game), but that the pilot episode's attempts at humor fell flat.

== Awards/Nominations ==
- 2012: Nomination – NAMIC Vision Award Best Performance – Comedy – Tasha Smith
- 2013: Nomination – NAMIC Vision Award Best Performance – Comedy – Tasha Smith
- 2014: Nomination – Image Awards Outstanding Actress in a Comedy Series – Tasha Smith
