= End of the Road (2022 film) =

2022 film by Millicent Shelton

- Promotional release poster
- Directed by: Millicent Shelton
- Screenplay by: Christopher J. Moore; David Loughery
- Story by: Christopher J. Moore
- Produced by: Mark Burg; Brad Kaplan; Tracey E. Edmonds
- Starring: Queen Latifah; Chris Bridges; Mychala Lee; Shaun Dixon; Beau Bridges
- Cinematography: Ed Wu
- Edited by: Tirsa Hackshaw
- Music by: Craig DeLeon
- Production companies: Mark Burg Productions; Edmonds Entertainment; Flavor Unit Entertainment; 42
- Distributed by: Netflix
- Release date: September 9, 2022
- Running time: 89 minutes
- Country: United States
- Language: English

End of the Road is a 2022 American crime thriller film directed by Millicent Shelton, written by Christopher J. Moore and David Loughery, and produced by Tracey Edmonds, Mark Burg, and Brad Kaplan. The film stars Queen Latifah, Chris Bridges, Mychala Lee, Shaun Dixon, and Beau Bridges.

End of the Road was released on September 9, 2022, by Netflix.

== Plot ==
Brenda Freeman and her two children, Kelly and Cam, relocate from Los Angeles to Houston after Brenda’s husband passes away from cancer. Brenda’s brother, Reggie, joins them on their move to Houston to live with their mother while they get back on their feet. During their cross-country drive, the group have a run in with a few rednecks who were angry when Kelly dismisses their flirtatious actions. Brenda apologizes to the men, and they continue their journey.

Two men recover cash from the Sinola Cartel for the mysterious “Mr. Cross”. One of the men, Harvey, then shoots his partner and drives off with the cash. The family stops at a motel in Arizona, where they hear a gunshot in the next room. Brenda, who is a nurse, rushes to the other room where she finds Harvey bleeding out. When Harvey dies, Reggie discovers the bag full of cash and secretly takes it. After being questioned by the police the next morning, the Freemans leave the motel.

The local sheriff, J.D. Hammers, calls Brenda and requests that she return to the motel to answer some questions. Brenda declines the request, expressing that she already told the police everything she knew. She then gets a mysterious call from an employee of Mr. Cross but believes it to be a scam. Brenda later discovers the bag of money and insists that they return it to the police. Brenda gets another call from the employee, demanding the return of their money. Understanding the danger her family is in, Brenda tells the caller that she intends to return the money, but on her own terms. She delivers the money to another motel for Mr. Cross to retrieve.

Believing that she is free of the mess, Brenda takes the family to a roadside attraction where Cam is kidnapped. Cross calls Brenda, demanding she deliver the money where he wants her or he will kill Cam. Brenda leaves Kelly in Reggie’s care and returns to the inn where she dropped off the money, only to discover that it is gone. She notices a young woman flee with the bag in a car. Brenda pursues, ending at a biker gang trailer park, where the girl knocks Brenda out. Captain Hammers tracks down Reggie and Kelly and warns them they must help him solve the case, or Brenda and Cam may die. Hammers takes them to his ranch for safety. Brenda gets free and attacks her captors. When they learn the money belongs to Mr. Cross, they willingly give up the money in fear of their lives. She then leaves to save Cam.

Hammers, Reggie, and Kelly arrive at the former’s ranch, where he introduces them to his wife, Val. Hammers opens his trunk to reveal a tied-up Cam and tells them that he is Mr. Cross. The couple lock them in their basement. Hammers / Mr. Cross calls Brenda to deliver the cash. The three Freemans manage to lure Hammers down into the basement, where they stun him. Val intervenes and stabs Reggie with a pair of scissors, but they overpower her. When Brenda arrives, they decide to drop the money on the driveway and take their leave. The Hammers free themselves and pursue the Freemans with the intention of killing them to tie up loose ends. When the Hammers catch them, Val attempts to run over Brenda but Brenda throws a road flare into their car. Hammers accidentally blows Val’s head off with his shotgun, then crashes his car into a tree and is killed on impact.

The Freemans drive on to Texas. Stopping at a diner, Reggie enthusiastically requests for them to dig in and enjoy as he will be paying for all of it, revealing he took the bag of cash which no longer belongs to anyone. Brenda realizes this is true and the Freemans celebrate over breakfast as they prepare to start their new lives.

== Cast ==
- Queen Latifah as Brenda Beaumont-Freeman
- Chris Bridges as Reginald "Reggie" Beaumont, Brenda's younger brother
- Mychala Faith Lee as Kelly Freeman, Brenda's teenage daughter and Reggie's niece
- Shaun Dixon as Cameron "Cam" Freeman, Brenda's younger son and Reggie's nephew
- Beau Bridges as Hammers
- Frances Lee McCain as Val, J.D.'s wife

== Production ==
On February 3, 2022, Netflix revealed End of the Road in a promotional film preview that aired for Super Bowl LVI. Director Millicent Shelton expressed her intention to create a "new genre" with the film, and for the film to reflect the Black experience in America. Queen Latifah, who stars as the film's lead, joined Shakim Compere as an executive producer, making End of the Road the first thriller that Latifah produced. Filming primarily took place in New Mexico.

== Reception ==
On Rotten Tomatoes, the film holds an approval rating of 31% based on 29 reviews, with an average rating of 4.5/10. The site's critical consensus reads, "An action thriller that's neither action-packed nor thrilling, End of the Road wastes a pair of perfectly good stars on a bottom-of-the-barrel story." Metacritic assigned the film a weighted average score of 44 out of 100, based on 10 critics, indicating "mixed or average" reviews.
