= Prime Prep Academy =

Group of Texan charter schools

- Dallas, Fort Worth, Texas, Oak Cliff, Texas; United States

Information
- Type: Charter school
- Opened: 2012
- Closed: 2015
- Grades: K-12
- Gender: Co-educational
- Enrollment: 300
- Colors: Black, red, and white
- Athletics conference: University Interscholastic League
- Team name: Cardinals

Prime Prep Academy was a grouping of charter schools in Texas cofounded in 2012 by Deion Sanders, a former American football and baseball player (the school's name is derived from his "Prime Time" moniker), who has also coached at the schools.

It had campuses in Dallas, Fort Worth, and Oak Cliff.

The school closed on January 30, 2015, after less than three years of operation, following sustained financial mismanagement, regulatory violations, and leadership infighting.

== Background ==
The concept behind Prime Prep originated in 2009 as "Prime U," an elite NFL Scouting Combine training program that aired on NFL Network for two seasons and carried Sanders' "Prime Time" nickname. Notable members of the original Prime U cohort included Sanders, Kevin Mathis, Omar Stoutmire, Duke Rousse, and Lucas Chizzonite.

Sanders' co-founder, D. L. Wallace, was a local minister who had previously run a summer food program under the nonprofit Uplift Fort Worth beginning in 2011; Sanders would later allege that Wallace and his wife had been permanently barred from that program over mismanagement of its funds, only to be reinstated after Wallace raised claims of racial discrimination. Uplift Fort Worth (unrelated to the separate and unaffiliated Uplift Education charter network) went on to serve as Prime Prep's nonprofit sponsoring organization.

== History ==
=== Founding and opening (2012) ===
Sanders has said the idea for the school came to him while watching a youth football camp, after which he and Wallace began planning a school that would combine athletics with academic preparation. Initial enrollment was more than 1,100 students. Prime Prep had campuses in Oak Cliff, Dallas and Fort Worth. The school opened its doors in August 2012, serving grades K-12 at both campuses. Sanders was named athletic director and assistant football coach, while Wallace became the school's executive director. The school was established with the goal of giving every child a free laptop supported by the VSCHOOLZ program.

Prime Prep athletics had an initial setback in its first year when the program was unable to field an eligible football team based on the rules of the University Interscholastic League (UIL), which governs interscholastic activities of public schools (including charter schools) in Texas. It had recruited significant portions of existing championship teams and "league hopping" athletes. After the issues were worked out, the school had problems finding opponents for their football team, with Sanders unsuccessfully appealing to schools as far away as Oklahoma to schedule a game. Ultimately Prime Prep would withdraw from the UIL and participate as an independent program.

The school was accused of racism and influence peddling. In 2012, Prime Prep also served as a backdrop for a reality TV series starring Sanders titled Deion's Family Playbook.

=== 2013: Leadership conflict and the ouster of D. L. Wallace ===
By 2013 the relationship between Sanders and Wallace had deteriorated. In October 2013, Sanders was fired for the first time after a confrontation with staff member Kevin Jefferson during a meeting about student-athletes' academic performance; Jefferson alleged Sanders grabbed him by the throat, while Sanders denied any assault took place and was later cited for misdemeanor assault. Sanders was rehired within hours of the firing.

The school was accused of racism and influence peddling. In December 2013, Sanders pressured cofounder D.L. Wallace, a local minister, out of the leadership of the schools over accusations of fraud and assault. Shortly afterwards, on December 3, 2013, Sanders was fired from his head coach position for a second time, this time by superintendent Rachel King-Sanders (no relation), a decision board chairman T. Christopher Lewis said came as a surprise, sparking an attempt by the school board to oust the superintendent who had fired Sanders. Later that month, incoming interim superintendent Ron Price announced plans to rehire Sanders in a role limited to the football program.

=== 2014: Financial and regulatory collapse ===
The school then received further negative press for violations of the state's board meeting laws, theft, eviction, and staff members failing to follow established policies. The school was featured in local news coverage again in 2014 for failing to hold open meetings and ranked as the lowest performing elementary school in North Texas as judged by Children at Risk.

The Texas Education Agency (TEA) opened a formal investigation in January 2014 into allegations of conflicts of interest, failure to conduct required criminal background checks, inadequate financial reporting, a shortage of qualified teachers, and violations of the National School Lunch Program; the agency separately determined that Prime Prep had failed to run background checks on 17 employees during 2013, including Sanders. Ten employees were fired and two resigned in the first week of the year, including the Fort Worth campus principal, the chief financial officer, and the human resources director, who was married to Wallace; incoming superintendent Ron Price said the school had been too heavily staffed with administrators. Price later said he had inherited roughly $400,000 in unpaid bills and a $700,000 budget deficit. That same month, Superintendent Ron Price turned over documents to the Tarrant County District Attorney's office alleging that hundreds of laptops had been stolen from Prime Prep. He later gave the information to the FBI.

Financial and legal troubles multiplied through the spring. A contractor sued the school over roughly $85,000 in unpaid remodeling costs at the Fort Worth campus, on top of an earlier lien filed over about $53,000 in unpaid work at the Dallas campus. A rent dispute with the landlord of the Fort Worth campus, a church with ties to Wallace, led to Prime Prep being locked out of the building; the school sued the landlord, and classes were relocated to an adjacent building. In April 2014, Prime Prep was removed from the National School Lunch Program after state officials found it could not document roughly $45,830 in meal-subsidy spending from the prior fall, creating an ongoing monthly budget shortfall and an approximately $46,000 repayment obligation. Sanders, no longer a paid employee of the school but continuing to film his reality series there for free, donated $35,000 around this time.

In July 2014, it was announced that the Texas Education Agency was going to revoke the school's charter for inconsistencies with the National School Lunch Program and fiscal mismanagement, to which the school responded that they were going to appeal the decision. By August 2014, Price described the school as facing a "crisis" and in need of $100,000 to $150,000 to make payroll after revenue had fallen by half over the summer, even after an earlier $100,000 emergency loan. The TEA rated Prime Prep "Improvement Required" for academic performance for a second consecutive year, with a third such rating set to trigger automatic loss of its charter, and separately cut off state funding tied to the Fort Worth campus after the school relocated it twice without notifying the agency, a lapse that ultimately cost the school close to $490,000. Prime Prep lost its administrative appeal of the charter revocation to the TEA that month, leaving a hearing before the State Office of Administrative Hearings (SOAH) as its final avenue of appeal. Also in August, Sanders — while not a school employee — held an unauthorized meeting for parents at another charter school urging families to transfer their children there, using Prime Prep's own robocall system to publicize it without the superintendent's knowledge; Price later said the episode severely damaged the school's finances. Sanders separately arranged an unauthorized meeting with TEA staff to discuss a possible merger with that school, which the state education commissioner rejected immediately.

In October 2014, the school stopped forwarding paycheck withholdings to the IRS, which had been averaging $25,000 to $28,000 per month. The IRS would later file a tax lien of $56,625. By November 2014, state funding for the year had fallen by roughly $2 million from projections, and Sanders donated a further $50,000 to keep the school operating; administrators also quietly stopped remitting payments to the Texas Workforce Commission, a lapse Price later said was made without his knowledge or authorization. In December 2014, the Texas Workforce Commission placed a hold on the school's state funding over its mounting debts, and Prime Prep stopped paying rent on its administrative offices and defaulted on its earlier emergency loan. On the last day of the year, former chief financial officer Kevin Jefferson sued the school for breach of contract and assault stemming from the October 2013 incident with Sanders; he won a $234,000 judgment against the by-then-defunct school in April 2015.

=== Closure (2015) ===
Superintendent Ron Price announced in January 2015 that he would resign at the end of the month, citing the school's inability to sustain itself financially, and employees revealed they had lost health insurance coverage in late 2014 after premiums went unpaid. At the school's final SOAH appeal hearing on January 27, 2015, its attorney moved to withdraw and no representative of the school appeared. The school was closed January 30, 2015, due to financial insolvency. A state-appointed board of managers closed both the Dallas and Fort Worth campuses immediately, with less than an hour's notice to students, families, and staff; Texas Education Commissioner Michael Williams agreed with the decision, saying "the financial resources simply aren't there." The TEA distributed information packets to help students transfer to other schools, and staff were briefed on applying for unemployment benefits and health coverage.

Journalist Phil Mushnick said of Prime Prep Academy: "After 2½ years, the school closed amidst an avalanche of unpaid administrators, faculty contractors, dilapidated buildings, allegedly misspent public funding and broken promises to black parents and hundreds of their children, mostly with an eye on college athletic scholarships."

=== Aftermath ===
Since 2013, Prime Prep and its nonprofit sponsor, Uplift Fort Worth, have been the subject of a federal lawsuit alleging wrongdoing in the National School Lunch Program. As of March 24, 2018, the case was still pending.

== Notable alumni ==
- Terrance Ferguson (born 1998), professional basketball player
- Emmanuel Mudiay (born 1996), professional basketball player
- Billy Preston (born 1997), professional basketball player
- Elijah Thomas (born 1996), professional basketball player
- Mark Vital (born 1997), professional basketball player
- PJ Washington (born 1998), NBA player for Dallas Mavericks
- James Proche (born 1996), NFL player for Tennessee Titans
