= A House Divided (TV series) =

- Genre: Soap opera
- Created by: Dan Garcia
- Starring: Demetria McKinney; Paula Jai Parker; Brad James; Lawrence Hilton-Jacobs; Parker McKenna Posey
- Composer: Gregory De Iulio
- Country of origin: United States
- Original language: English
- No. of seasons: 5
- No. of episodes: 34

Production
- Executive producers: Dan Garcia; Matthew Helderman; Luke Taylor
- Running time: 42 minutes
- Production company: RLJ Entertainment

Original release
- Network: Urban Movie Channel (seasons 1–3A); ALLBLK (season 3B–present)
- Release: July 18, 2019 – February 16, 2023

A House Divided is an American soap opera created by Dan Garcia and starring Demetria McKinney, Paula Jai Parker, Brad James and Lawrence Hilton-Jacobs. The series follows the members of the wealthy Sanders family in Los Angeles after the loss of the family's matriarch while uncovering and facing a variety of secrets and scandals.

The first season premiered on the streaming service Urban Movie Channel on July 18, 2019. On October 25, 2019, the series was renewed for a second season, while LisaRaye McCoy and Parker McKenna Posey have joined the cast. The first season received three Indie Series Awards nominations. At the 48th Daytime Emmy Awards it received three nominations: Outstanding Limited Drama Series, and for Outstanding Performance by a Lead Actor in a Daytime Fiction Program (Lawrence Hilton-Jacobs, Brad James). On May 10, 2021, the series was renewed for a fourth season.

== Plot ==
A House Divided follows the direct descendants of Letty Sanders, an enslaved woman who after arriving in Los Angeles, California in 1821 became the wealthiest Black woman in the newly formed city. It centers on the present-day members of the highly esteemed Sanders family, Cameron Sanders (Lawrence Hilton-Jacobs) has raised his three children: Stephanie (Paula Jai Parker), Cameron, Jr. (Brad James), and Torrance (Steph Santana), in opulent wealth. After the sudden passing of his wife amidst a brewing government investigation into the business dealings of the family-owned bank, a new woman, Carissa Walker (Demetria McKinney) emerges from the shadows determined to be the next Mrs. Cameran Sanders. As secrets are uncovered and scandals emerge, the Sanders family will be forced to band together for the sake of their survival or risk the ultimate demise of their long-standing legacy.

== Cast and characters ==
- Demetria McKinney as Carissa Walker
- Lawrence Hilton-Jacobs as Cameron Sanders, Sr.
- Paula Jai Parker as Stephanie Sanders
- Brad James as Cameron Sanders, Jr.
- Orlando Eric Street as Maynard
- Parker McKenna Posey as Summer Jones(Season 2-5)
- LisaRaye as Alexis Jones (Season 2-5 )

== Episodes ==
| Season | Episodes | | Originally released | | |
| Season | Episodes | | First released | Last released | Network |
|---|---|---|---|---|---|
| 1 | 6 | | July 18, 2019 | August 21, 2019 | Urban Movie Channel |
| 2 | 6 | | April 30, 2020 | June 4, 2020 | Urban Movie Channel |
| 3 | 8 | 2 | December 23, 2020 | December 30, 2020 | Urban Movie Channel |
| 3 | 8 | 6 | January 7, 2021 | February 11, 2021 | ALLBLK |
| 4 | 8 | | January 13, 2022 | March 3, 2022 | ALLBLK |
| 5 | 8 | | January 12, 2023 | March 2, 2023 | ALLBLK |

=== Season 1 (2019) ===
| No. overall | No. in season | Title | Directed by | Written by | Original release date |
|---|---|---|---|---|---|
| 1 | 1 | "A House Divided" | Honesty J. Edwards | Dan Garcia | July 18, 2019 |
| 2 | 2 | "Heaven's Lieutenants" | Honesty J. Edwards | Dan Garcia | July 24, 2019 |
| 3 | 3 | "Just Like You" | Honesty J. Edwards | Dan Garcia | July 31, 2019 |
| 4 | 4 | "Hide No More" | Honesty J. Edwards | Dan Garcia | August 7, 2019 |
| 5 | 5 | "That Woman" | Honesty J. Edwards | Dan Garcia | August 14, 2019 |
| 6 | 6 | "Where the Bodies are Buried" | Honesty J. Edwards | Dan Garcia | August 21, 2019 |

=== Season 2 (2020) ===
| No. overall | No. in season | Title | Directed by | Written by | Original release date |
|---|---|---|---|---|---|
| 7 | 1 | "Now You're In" | Unknown | Unknown | April 30, 2020 |
| 8 | 2 | "Step Into It" | Unknown | Unknown | May 7, 2020 |
| 9 | 3 | "Why So Surprised?" | Unknown | Unknown | May 14, 2020 |
| 10 | 4 | "Need The Money" | Unknown | Unknown | May 21, 2020 |
| 11 | 5 | "Willing to Sacrifice" | Unknown | Unknown | May 28, 2020 |
| 12 | 6 | "Legacy" | Unknown | Unknown | June 4, 2020 |

=== Season 3 (2020–21) ===
| No. overall | No. in season | Title | Directed by | Written by | Original release date |
|---|---|---|---|---|---|
| 13 | 1 | "They Can Kill Me" | Unknown | Unknown | December 23, 2020 |
| 14 | 2 | "We All Got Choices" | Unknown | Unknown | December 30, 2020 |
| 15 | 3 | "Too Much Blood" | Unknown | Unknown | January 7, 2021 |
| 16 | 4 | "You Better Come Correct" | Unknown | Unknown | January 14, 2021 |
| 17 | 5 | "Risk It All" | Unknown | Unknown | January 21, 2021 |
| 18 | 6 | "Monuments of What We Can Achieve" | Unknown | Unknown | January 28, 2021 |
| 19 | 7 | "You Forced My Hand" | Unknown | Unknown | February 4, 2021 |
| 20 | 8 | "Wake Up" | Unknown | Unknown | February 11, 2021 |

=== Season 4 (2022) ===
| No. overall | No. in season | Title | Directed by | Written by | Original release date |
|---|---|---|---|---|---|
| 21 | 1 | "That's My World" | Unknown | Unknown | January 13, 2022 |
| 22 | 2 | "We All Have Sinned" | Unknown | Unknown | January 20, 2022 |
| 23 | 3 | "Two Steps Ahead" | Unknown | Unknown | January 27, 2022 |
| 24 | 4 | "The Iron Law" | Unknown | Unknown | February 3, 2022 |
| 25 | 5 | "Nobody Knows" | Unknown | Unknown | February 10, 2022 |
| 26 | 6 | "Under The Jail" | Unknown | Unknown | February 17, 2022 |
| 27 | 7 | "All Acts Get Old" | Unknown | Unknown | February 24, 2022 |
| 28 | 8 | "Why The Sudden Rush?" | Unknown | Unknown | March 3, 2022 |

=== Season 5 (2023) ===
| No. overall | No. in season | Title | Directed by | Written by | Original release date |
|---|---|---|---|---|---|
| 29 | 1 | "Time of Betrayal" | Unknown | Unknown | January 12, 2023 |
| 30 | 2 | "A Gust of Wind" | Unknown | Unknown | January 19, 2023 |
| 31 | 3 | "Double or Nothing" | Unknown | Unknown | January 26, 2023 |
| 32 | 4 | "This Ends Today" | Unknown | Unknown | February 2, 2023 |
| 33 | 5 | "Dark Storm" | Unknown | Unknown | February 9, 2023 |
| 34 | 6 | "It's Been Too Long" | Unknown | Unknown | February 16, 2023 |
| 35 | 7 | "Clean Up Shop" | Unknown | Unknown | February 23, 2023 |
| 36 | 8 | "New Beginnings" | Unknown | Unknown | March 2, 2023 |
