= Parker McKenna Posey =

American actress

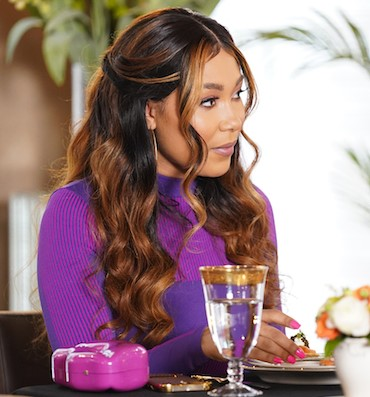
- Posey in Games People Play in 2021
- Born: August 18, 1995 (age 30); Los Angeles, California, U.S.
- Years active: 2001–present
- Known for: My Wife and Kids
- Children: 1

Parker McKenna Posey (born August 18, 1995) is an American actress. She is known for her role as Kady Kyle on the television show My Wife and Kids (2001–2005).

== Early life ==
Posey was born on August 18, 1995, to Polo Posey and Heather Stone.

== Career ==
Posey rose to fame at a young age as she portrayed Kady Kyle in the sitcom My Wife and Kids from 2001 to 2005. She also appeared in the music video for "Sweet Baby" by Macy Gray featuring Erykah Badu.

In 2018, Posey joined the cast of the BET drama series Games People Play, based on the novel Games Divas Play. She later joined the second season of the soap opera A House Divided, playing the role of Summer. In 2021, she appeared in the music video for the song "Beautiful Lies" by rapper Yung Bleu and singer Kehlani.

In 2023, Posey starred in the Tubi thriller film The Assistant. She also appeared in the BET+ thriller film Wake the same year. She starred in the BET+ thriller Incision, which released in 2024. Posey starred in the Tubi film Rock the Boat 2, a sequel to Rock the Boat which released the previous year. In the film, she plays Millie, a woman attempting to rebuild her life after her tragic past.

== Personal life ==
In 2018, Posey's ex-boyfriend, YouTuber Chris Sails, was arrested for assaulting her.

Posey has a daughter with partner Jay Jay Wilson, which she revealed on Instagram in May 2021.

== Filmography ==
=== Film ===
Year	Title	Role	Notes
2005	Meet the Santas	Poppy Frost	TV movie
2007	Alice Upside Down	Elizabeth	
2010	Summer Camp	Kerry	TV movie
2015	Lucky Girl	Trisha Meadows	
2016	90 Minutes of the Fever	Crystal	
2022	We Are Gathered Here Today	Keke Stone	
2023	The Assistant	Annie	
2023	Rock The Boat	Millie	
2023	Wake	Bryn	
2024	Incision	Gia	
2024	Rock The Boat 2	Millie	
2024	The Assistant 2	Annie	

=== Television ===
Year	Legacy	Role	Notes
2001–2005	My Wife and Kids	Kady Kyle	Main cast
2001	NYPD Blue	Latanya	Episode: "Daveless in New York"
2003	Switched!	Herself	Episode: "Jennifer and Aubrey"
2004	Strong Medicine	Lily	Episode: "Touched by an Idol"
2009	iCarly	Kathy	Episode: "iWant My Website Back"
2019–2021	Games People Play	Laila James	Main cast
2020	The Ho Phase	Ananda	Main cast
2020–2023	A House Divided	Summer	Main cast (seasons 2–5)
2023	College Hill: Celebrity Edition	Herself	Main cast (season 2)
2026	Jupiter Jones	Summer	2 episodes

=== Music videos ===
Year	Song	Artist
2001	"Sweet Baby"	Macy Gray ft. Erykah Badu
2021	"Beautiful Lies"	Yung Bleu and Kehlani
