= Lauren London =

American actress (born 1984)

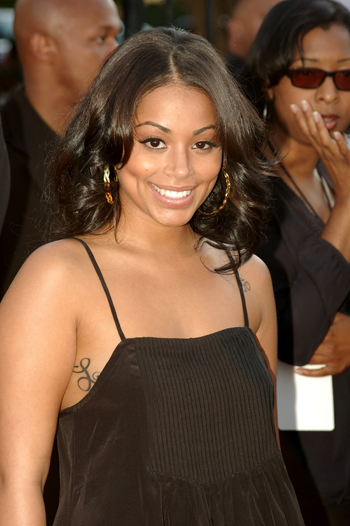
- London in 2007
- Born: Lauren Nicole London; December 5, 1984 (age 41); Los Angeles, California, U.S
- Occupation: Actress
- Years active: 2003–present
- Partner: Nipsey Hussle (2013–2019; his death)
- Children: 2

Lauren Nicole London (born December 5, 1984) is an American actress. She is known for her roles in films and televisions shows including ATL (2006), This Christmas (2007), Madea's Big Happy Family (2011), Baggage Claim (2013), The Game (2013–2015), Games People Play (2019), Without Remorse (2021), and You People (2023).

== Early life ==
London was born to an African-American mother and an Ashkenazi Jewish father in Los Angeles. After attending Palisades Charter High School into her second year, London was homeschooled.

== Career ==
=== 2006: Breakthrough with ATL ===
London appeared in music videos for artists such as Tyrese, Ludacris, Pharrell ("Frontin'") and Snoop Dogg. Her breakout year came in 2006, where she made her television debut in the "Everybody Hates Funerals" episode of the sitcom Everybody Hates Chris. That same year, London landed her first film role as well, playing hip-hop artist T.I.'s romantic lead in the film ATL. For her work, London was nominated for "Best Supporting Actress" at the Black Movie Awards. In 2007, London landed a role on the HBO comedy series Entourage, playing the character Turtle's (Jerry Ferrara) love interest. Based on her performance in ATL, London was given her role in 2007's This Christmas without having to audition. London, along with singers Cassie and Asia Nitollano. She became one of the spokesmodels for the Sean John woman's collection in 2007.

In 2008, London landed the role of the character Christina in the first season of the show 90210, originally thought to be a possible romantic interest of Tristan Wilds' character Dixon Wilson. London's next film role was the character Ivy in the 2009 release Next Day Air. That same year, she played the character Cammy Alcott in the Chris Columbus film I Love You, Beth Cooper. London appeared on the covers of magazines such as King and Jewel.

=== 2011-present: The Game, and Games People Play ===
London appeared in Tyler Perry's Madea's Big Happy Family, which was released on April 22, 2011. She made a cameo appearance in the premiere of VH1's Single Ladies. London joined the cast of the hit BET show The Game as a series regular from the sixth season until the series finale. She played a character named Kiera, "a former child star who starred in a Cosby Show-esque sitcom". London co-starred, alongside Paula Patton, Jill Scott, and Derek Luke, in Baggage Claim (2013), the film adaptation of playwright and director David E. Talbert's 2005 novel. In 2016, London co-starred in the film The Perfect Match as Ginger. In 2018, London starred in the Lifetime Movies Always & 4Ever and Poinsettias for Christmas.

In 2019, London played the lead character, Vanessa King, in the BET show Games People Play. In 2021, London starred in the film Without Remorse. The film was released on Prime Video on April 30, 2021. In January 2023, London starred in the American comedy film You People on Netflix. London said filming the film taught her more about her Jewish side of the family.

== Personal life ==
London dated Lil Wayne on and off. The couple's son, Kameron Carter, was born September 9, 2009. In May 2011, London said of her relationship with Wayne, "I met Wayne when I was 15 years old. I've known him a very long time, and we were in a relationship that didn't make it. We tried more than once to revive it, and we were engaged briefly years ago, but we eventually parted ways. People see the 'Lil Wayne' personality and think they know who he really is. My son's father is an intelligent, loving, and lovable person who will always be a dear friend. And that will never change. That is all." Lil Wayne's second verse of the song "Young'n Blues" explains how he met London and refers to her as "young Cali sweet thang".

London dated Ermias Asghedom, better known as American rapper Nipsey Hussle, from 2013 until his murder on March 31, 2019. Nipsey and London were thought to have become engaged, but it was revealed that their engagement photos were for a GQ photoshoot. The couple's son Kross Ermias Asghedom was born August 31, 2016.

In 2022, London and Puma collaborated on the L.A Love Story project. The collection is inspired by her hometown, Los Angeles. Items feature Nipsey Hussle.

== Filmography ==
=== Film ===
Year	Title	Role	Notes
2006	ATL	Erin "New New" Garnett	
2007	This Christmas	Melanie 'Mel' Whitfield	
2009	I Love You, Beth Cooper	Cammy	Also performer
2009	Next Day Air	Ivy	
2009	Good Hair	Herself	
2011	Madea's Big Happy Family	Renee	
2013	Baggage Claim	Sheree Moore	
2016	The Perfect Match	Ginger	
2018	Always & 4Ever	Tammy	
2021	Without Remorse	Pam Madden Clark	
2023	You People	Amira Mohammed	
2027	Snoop	Beverly Tate	

=== Television ===
Year	Title	Role	Notes
2006	Everybody Hates Chris	Monay	Episode: "Everybody Hates Funerals"
2007	Entourage	Kelly	Episodes: "The Resurrection" and "The Prince's Bride"
2008–2009	90210	Christina Worthy	3 episodes
2009	Keeping Up with the Kardashians	Herself	Episode: "The Wedding"
2011	Single Ladies	Shelley	4 episodes
2011	Reed Between the Lines	Jentry	Episode: "Let's Talk About Computer Love"
2013–2015	The Game	Keira Whitaker	Lead role
2017	Rebel	Kim	Episode: "Chasing Ghosts"
2017	The Talk	Herself / Guest Co-Hostess	Episode: "Guest Co-Hostesses Lauren London & Carnie Wilson/ Molly Shannon"
2018	Hip Hop Squares	Herself / Panelist	Episode: "Dave East vs Nipsey Hussle"
2018	Poinsettias for Christmas	Patty Mason	Television film
2019	Games People Play	Vanessa King	10 episodes
2021	True Story	Monyca	7 episodes

== Awards and nominations ==
Year	Organization	Award	Film	Result
2006	Black Movie Awards	Outstanding Performance by an Actress in a Supporting Role	ATL	Nominated

== See also ==
- Hip hop models
