= Brad James =

American television actor (born 1981)

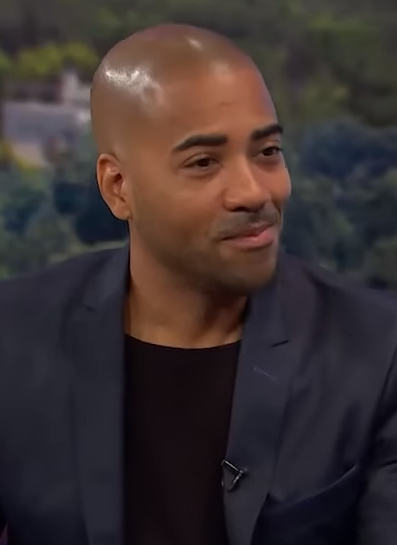
- James in 2019
- Born: July 7, 1981 (age 45)
- Occupation: Actor
- Years active: 2008–present
- Spouse: Keshia Knight Pulliam (m. 2021)
- Children: 4

Brad James (born July 7, 1981) is an American actor. James is best known for his role as Todd in the sitcom Tyler Perry's For Better or Worse.

== Early years ==
James was raised by his maternal grandparents. He spent four years as a U.S. Marine serving in combat units. Although known for being athletic and performing his own stunts in films, James is working with an ankle that never healed properly after he broke it in late 2000, while serving in the US Marine Corps. During his time of service, he studied the Marine Corps Martial Arts Program, LINE training combat system, and Brazilian Jiu-Jitsu.

== Career ==
James has appeared in many commercials for national brands including Walmart, AutoTrader.com and BlackBerry. In his first credited speaking role on-screen, he played the lead role of John Merser in Maverick Entertainment's Champion Road. In 2013, James won the Georgia's "Best Actor" award at the Georgia Entertainment Gala. In 2013, he was cast to portray the role of Adam in the movie Marry Me for Christmas.

== Personal life ==
James and actress Keshia Knight Pulliam were married in an intimate ceremony in September 2021. They began dating in 2019 after meeting on the set of the television movie Pride and Prejudice: Atlanta. In December 2022, it was announced that Knight Pulliam was pregnant, and she gave birth to their son in April 2023. Additionally, James is the stepfather to Ella (born 2017), Knight Pulliam's daughter with ex-husband, retired National Football League player Edgerton Hartwell. James also has another child from a previous marriage.

== Filmography ==
=== Film ===
Year	Title	Role	Notes
2008	Champion Road	Jonathan Merser	Video
2009	4 Minutes	Speed Daters	
2010	Lost Without You	David Landeryou	Short
2010	Champion Road: Arena	Jonathan Merser	
2012	The Black Book	Detective Chase Austin	Short
2012	Rhythm	Dr. Brad Taylor	Short
2012	Forbidden	Steven Giles	Short
2012	Parental Guidance	Officer Chernin	
2012	Thy Will Be Done	Omega	
2013	The Haunting in Connecticut 2: Ghosts of Georgia	Prentiss	
2013	Prisoners	Officer Carter	
2013	Angry Insecure Men	Aiden	Short
2013	Emma Mae Tell	Guy	Short
2014	Comeback Dad	Spence	
2014	C.I.G.A.R.	Ken	
2015	Skinned	Michael	
2015	What Love Will Make You Do	Joe	
2015	When I Hold My Ears	Danny Jones	
2015	Zodiac Sign	Antonio	
2016	The Choice	Ben	
2016	For the Love of Christmas	Owen Cotton	
2016	The Rookie & the Rat	Zack	Short
2017	Walk Away from Love	Ray	
2018	When It Comes Around	Dexter	
2018	The Other Side	Allen Turner	
2019	His, Hers, and The Truth	Alan	
2020	Somebody's in My House	-	
2021	Fruits of the Heart	Jonathan	
2022	The Love We Had	Anthony Stevenson	
2022	Sons 2 the Grave	R.D.	
2022	Single Not Searching	Tim	
2023	Dashing Through the Snow	Theo Garrick	
2024	Shirley	Huey P. Newton	
2024	Nothing Even Matters	Travis Boyd	

=== Television ===
Year	Title	Role	Notes
2009	Meet the Browns	Jacob	Episode: "Meet the Parents"
2010	The Vampire Diaries	Tow Truck Driver	Episode: "Memory Lane"
2011	Let's Stay Together	Shaun	Episode: "Dirty Scraps of Leather"
2011	One Tree Hill	Guy	Episode: "The Smoker You Drink, the Player You Get"
2011	Teen Wolf	Vice Principal	Episode: "Wolf Moon"
2011	Single Ladies	Dante	Episode: "Cry Me a River" & "Indecent Proposal"
2011	Reed Between the Lines	Boris	Episode: "Let's Talk About Boys in Tights"
2011–16	Tyler Perry's For Better or Worse	Todd	Main cast (season 1–4), guest (season 5)
2012	The Rickey Smiley Show	Kwame	Episode: "Cleaning Crisis"
2013	Devious Maids	Bobby D	Episode: "Making Your Bed"
2013	Marry Me for Christmas	Adam	TV movie
2014	Daddy's Home	-	TV movie
2014	First Impression	Scorpion Kiss	TV movie
2014	Love the One You're With	-	TV movie
2014	Hart of Dixie	Vince	Episode: "Back in the Saddle Again"
2015	Born Again Virgin	Andre	Episode: "Slaying Your Dragons"
2015	Make Time 4 Love	Sean	Episode: "Make Time 4 Love Ep. 1"
2016	NCIS: New Orleans	Kevin Heller	Episode: "Suspicious Minds"
2016	Merry Christmas, Baby	Adam	TV movie
2017	The New Edition Story	David Vaughn	Episode: "Part 1"
2017	Underground	Bo	Episode: "Nok Aaut" & "28"
2017–18	Superstition	Calvin Hastings	Main cast
2019	American Soul	Professor Haygood	Recurring cast (season 1)
2019	Pride and Prejudice: Atlanta	Mr. Bingley	TV movie
2019–23	A House Divided	Cameron Sanders, Jr.	Main cast
2020–21	Outer Banks	Agent Bratcher	Guest (season 1), recurring cast (season 2)
2021	A Chestnut Family Christmas	Malcolm Butler	TV movie
2022	Girlfriendship	Kareem Benjamin	TV movie
2022	A New Orleans Noel	Anthony Brown	TV movie
2024	Christmas in the Friendly Skies	Larry	TV Movie
