= Tracey Edmonds =

American businesswoman (born 1967)

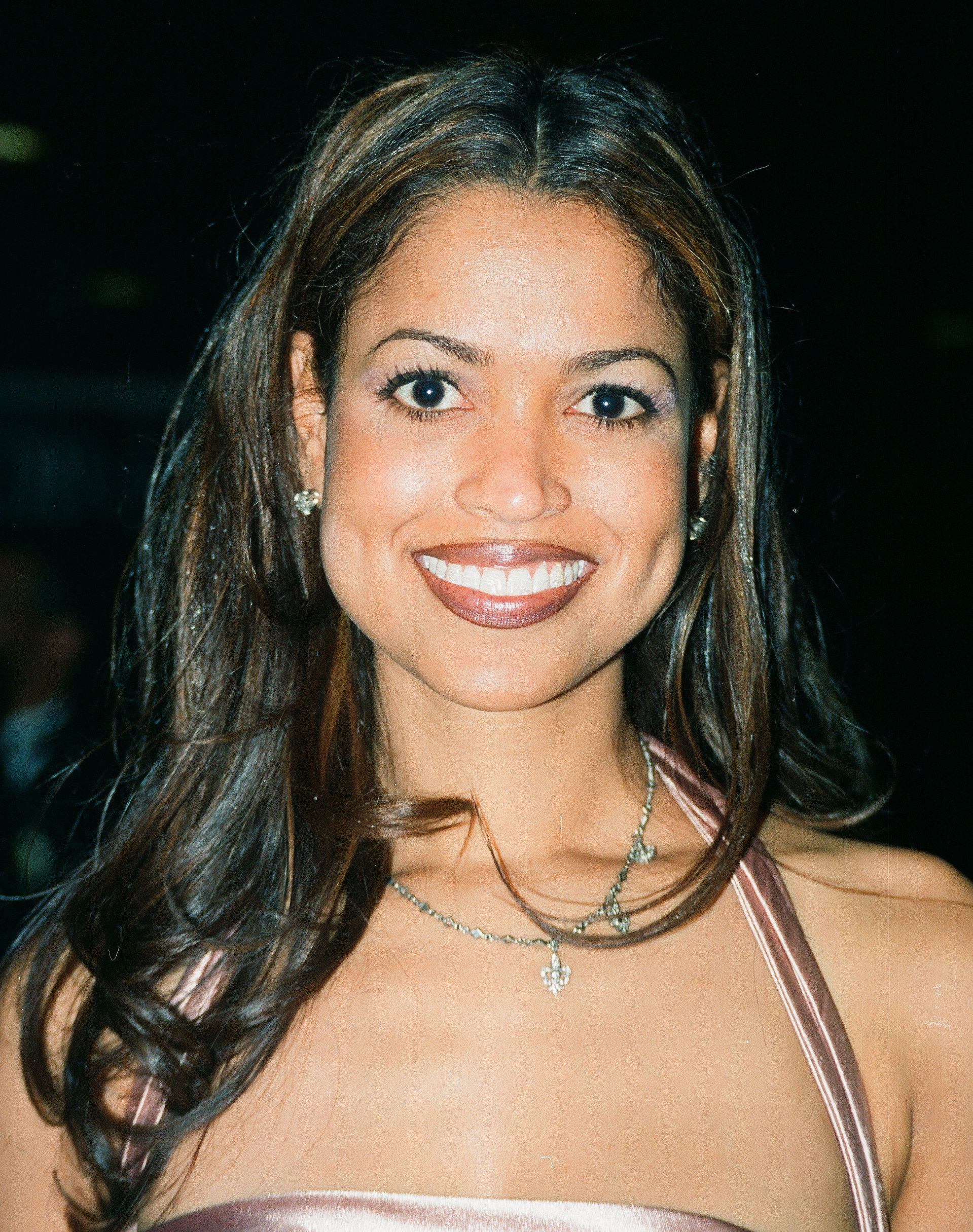
- Edmonds in 1996
- Born: Tracey Elaine McQuarn; February 18, 1967 (age 59); Los Angeles, California, U.S.
- Education: Stanford University
- Occupations: Businesswoman; model; producer; television personality
- Years active: 1997–present
- Spouse: Kenneth "Babyface" Edmonds (m. 1992; div. 2005)
- Partner(s): Eddie Murphy (2008); Deion Sanders (2012–2023)
- Children: 2

Tracey Elaine Edmonds (née McQuarn; born February 18, 1967) is an American businesswoman and television producer. She is the CEO of Edmonds Entertainment Group Inc and Alrightnow.com, and was a host of the television program Extra. She was on the national board of directors for the Producers Guild of America in 2012.

== Biography ==
Tracey Edmonds has created and produced projects for television, film, music, and digital media. In 2014, Edmonds joined Extra and left the company in 2017. While at Extra, she earned an Emmy Award for co-hosting alongside Mario Lopez and Charissa Thompson. Edmonds is CEO and President of Edmonds Entertainment. In 2013, Edmonds founded Alright TV, a family- and faith-oriented Web network. Edmonds executive produced Games People Play (BET), a drama about the NBA that aired in 2019.

Edmonds resides in Beverly Hills, California with her two sons.

== Filmography ==
| Year | Title | Executive producer | note |
|---|---|---|---|
| 1997 | Soul Food | producer | |
| 1997 | Hav Plenty | executive producer | |
| 1999 | Light It Up | producer | |
| 2000 | Punks | producer | |
| 2000-2004 | Soul Food: The Series | executive producer | TV series |
| 2001 | Josie and the Pussycats | producer | |
| 2003 | Maniac Magee | executive producer | TV series |
| 2004 | Summer of 77 | executive producer | TV series |
| 2004-2009 | College Hill | executive producer | TV series |
| 2006 | Robbin Hoodz | executive producer | (announced) |
| 2006 | Lil' Kim: Countdown to Lockdown | executive producer | TV series |
| 2006 | DMX: Soul of a Man | executive producer | |
| 2007 | Stage Black | executive producer | TV series |
| 2007 | Good Luck Chuck | producer | |
| 2007 | Who's Your Caddy? | producer | |
| 2007 | College Hill Interns | executive producer | TV series |
| 2009 | New in Town | producer | |
| 2011 | Jumping the Broom | producer | |
| 2013 | Walk This Way | executive producer | TV series |
| 2013 | The Choir | executive producer | TV series |
| 2013 | Take Action | executive producer | TV series |
| 2014 | Mr. Right | executive producer | comedy short |
| 2014-2015 | Deion's Family Playbook | executive producer | TV series |
| 2015 | With This Ring | executive producer | TV movie |
| 2019-present | Games People Play | executive producer | TV series |
| 2020 | The Postcard Killings | executive producer | |
| 2022 | College Hill: Celebrity Edition | executive producer | TV series |
| 2022 | End of the Road | producer | |
