= Shaun Robinson =

American television personality

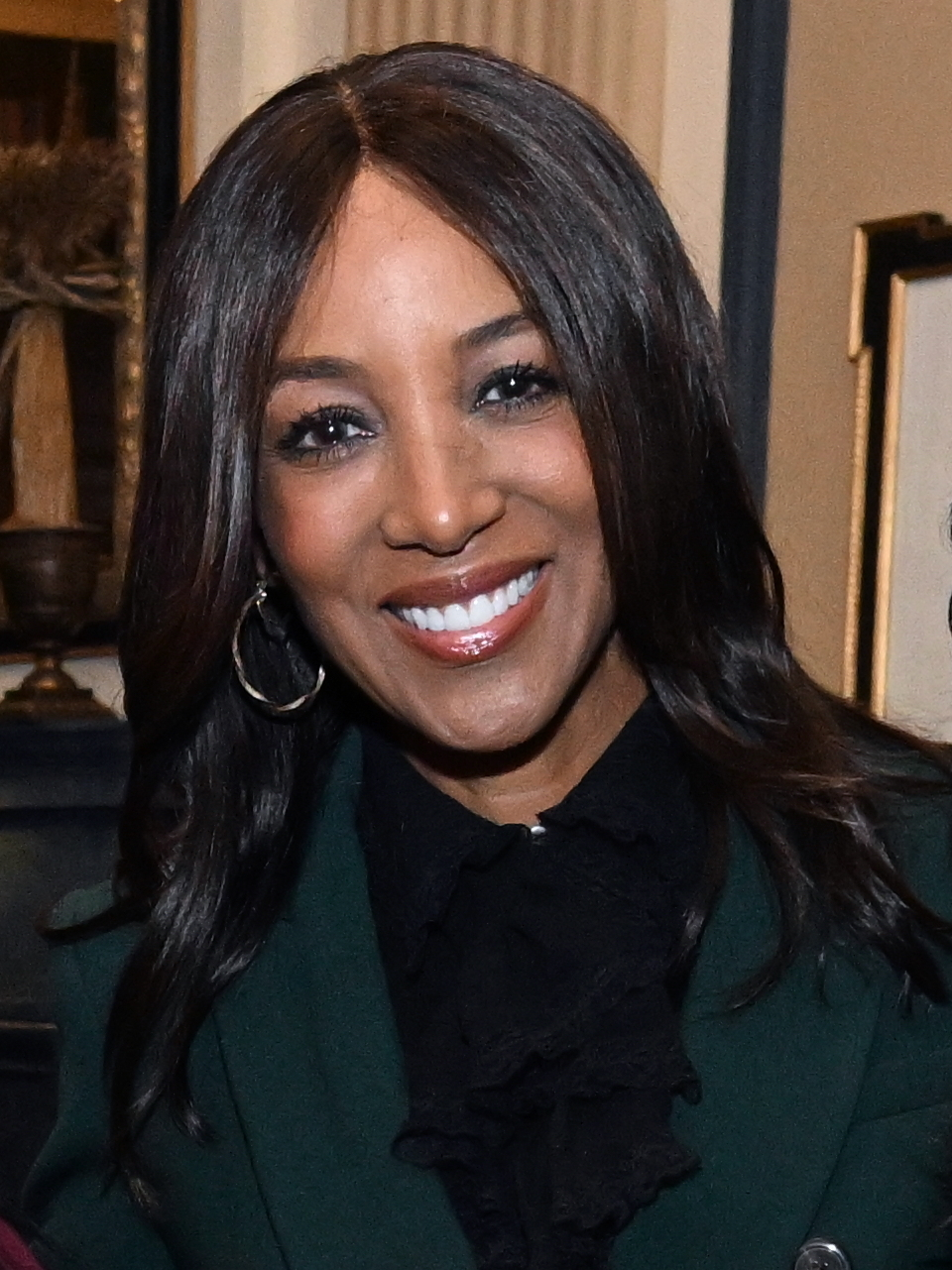
- Robinson in November 2024
- Born: July 12, 1962 (age 64); Detroit, Michigan, United States
- Occupations: Actress; journalist; television host; television personality; author
- Notable work: Access Hollywood (1999–2015) 90 Day Fiancé (2016–present)
- Website: www.shaunrobinson.com

Shaun Robinson (born July 12, 1962) is an American television host, author, producer, philanthropist, television personality and actress. She is perhaps best known for hosting Access Hollywood (1999–2015) and 90 Day Fiancé and its spin-offs (2016–present). Her accolades include an Emmy Award for her live coverage of A Grand Night in Harlem for the Black Sports and Entertainment Hall of Fame.

== Early life ==
Shaun Robinson was born on July 12, 1962, in Detroit, Michigan. She has a brother and two sisters. She is a graduate of Cass Technical High School. She then moved to Atlanta to attend Spelman College.

== Career ==
Robinson's career began in Detroit at WGPR-TV (now WWJ-TV), the first African-American owned television station in the U.S. After that Robinson was a medical reporter and weekend anchor for WISN-TV in Milwaukee, Wisconsin, where her series on women and cancer garnered her an Associated Press award. She also served as host of the daily talk show Milwaukee's Talking. Robinson later joined newly formed KEYE-TV in Austin, Texas, in 1995, as a reporter and anchor where her series "Profiles in Power", focusing on women who made an impact in Central Texas, earned Robinson an American Women in Radio and Television award. In 1999, she started working as a weekend anchor and correspondent for Access Hollywood, a job that eventually lasted for 16 years.

Before joining Access Hollywood, Robinson was a reporter and anchor for WSVN-TV in Miami, Florida. During her tenure there, Robinson anchored coverage of both the Clinton impeachment hearings and of Hurricane George, which devastated the Florida Keys. She traveled to Oklahoma to profile survivors of the Oklahoma City bombing. She filled in for Meredith Vieira on Who Wants to Be a Millionaire for the week of June 8–12, 2009. She has contributed reports to television shows NBC Nightly News and Today.

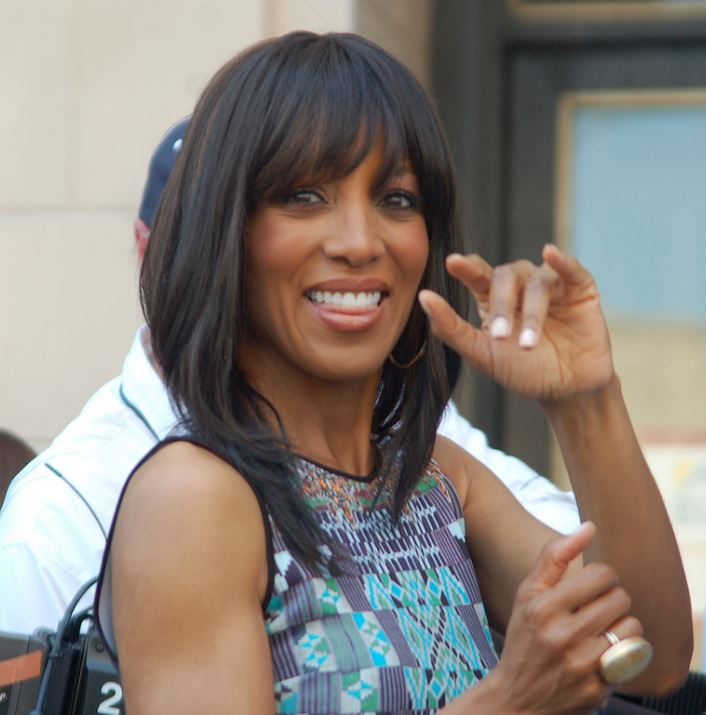
Robinson in May 2013

In October 2010, Robinson was a guest star on a celebrity edition episode of the game show Don't Forget the Lyrics. She played and won $10,000 for her selected charity, Girls, Inc. Robinson co-hosted the NBC coverage of the Tournament of Roses Parade with Al Roker in 2011 and 2012. She has provided coverage for the Academy Awards, Golden Globes, Emmy Awards and Grammy Awards. In 2016, Robinson began hosting Tell All specials for TLC’s 90 Day Fiancé and its spin-offs. In 2019, Robinson landed the role of Kris Kensington on BET’s Games People Play. In February 2020, Forbes published an article about Robinson as part of the magazine's an ongoing series "The Secrets of Successful Women."

Her first book titled Exactly As I Am: Celebrated Women Share Candid Advice with Today’s Girls on What it Takes to Believe in Yourself was published on March 31, 2009, by Ballantine Books. The book of motivational advice and anecdotes presents quotes and stories from role models notable for confidence, determination and generosity. The book inspires girls to find their inner strength, become confident, and believe in themselves.

== Personal life ==
In 1994, Robinson married MLB player Darryl Hamilton, but they later divorced.

== Philanthropy ==
Robinson has launched a nonprofit organization to help empower girls and young women. The S.H.A.U.N. Foundation for Girls supports small charities that are doing work in five key areas of girls issues: (S)TEM, (H)EALTH, (A)RTS, (U)NITY and (N)EIGHBORHOODS. Robinson and her foundation have been featured on the CBS show, Hidden Heroes.

== Filmography ==
=== As actress ===
Film and television roles
Year	Title	Role	Notes
2000	Any Day Now	Reporter #2	Episode: "You Think I Am Lying to You?"
2001	America's Sweethearts	Nevada Anchorwoman	Film
2001	Dr. Dolittle 2	Newscaster	Film
2003	Bruce Almighty	Newscaster	Film
2003	Charmed	Kinesha Robinson	Episode: "Forget Me... Not"
2003	She Spies	TV Broadcaster	Episode: "Cover Me"
2003	Half & Half	Lingerie Clerk	Episode: "The Big College Admission Episode"
2006	Studio 60	Monitor Reporter #3	Episode: "Pilot"
2008	Law & Order: Criminal Intent	Shaun Robinson	Episode: "Vanishing Act"
2009	Monk	Talk Show Host	Episode: "Mr. Monk Takes the Stand"
2012	Last Man Standing	Shaun Robinson	Episode: "Tree of Strife"
2014	Jessica Paré Can Eat Whatever She Wants	N/A	Short film
2019	Games People Play	Kris Kensington	5 episodes

=== As herself ===
Television hosting and other credits
Year	Title	Role	Notes
1968	Operation: Entertainment	Operation Entertainment Girl	Episode: "Episode #2.5"
1999–2015	Access Hollywood	Correspondent / Host	
2002	The Parkers	Herself	Episode: "It's Showtime"
2002	8th Annual Soul Train Lady of Soul Awards	Presenter	TV special
2002–2003	The Proud Family	Herself (voice)	Episodes: "Hip-Hop Helicopter" and "Hooray for Iesha"
2004	TV One Access	Host	
2005	The Contender	Herself	Uncredited; Episode: "Betrayed"
2006	The View	Co-Host	Episodes: "Episode dated 5 December 2006" and "Episode dated 8 December 2006"
2007–2008	Dirt	Herself	3 episodes
2009	Who Wants to Be a Millionaire	Guest Host	5 episodes
2013	Hit the Floor	Herself	Episode: "Pilot"
2013	Real Husbands of Hollywood	Herself	Episode: "The Harter They Fall"
2016–21	90 Day Fiancé	Host	8 episodes
2016–21	90 Day Fiancé: Happily Ever After?	Host	15 episodes
2017–20	90 Day Fiancé: Before the 90 Days	Host	7 episodes
2018	American Dream: Detroit	Interviewee	Documentary
2018	TLC's Royal Wedding Revealed	Host	TV special
2019	90 Day Fiancé: The Other Way	Host	3 episodes
2021	90 Day Bares All	Host	21 episodes
2021–22	90 Day: The Single Life	Host	4 episodes
2022	Darcey & Stacey	Host	Episodes: "The Twins Tell All Part 1" and "The Twins Tell All Part 2"
2025	90 Day: The Last Resort	Host	5 episodes
