= List of For Better or Worse (TV series) episodes =

For Better or Worse is an American situational comedy-drama series created and produced by playwright/director/producer Tyler Perry. The series is based on Perry's 2007 film Why Did I Get Married? and its 2010 sequel Why Did I Get Married Too? It premiered on TBS on November 25, 2011. Led by the comical, over-the-top antics of Marcus and Angela Williams, the ensemble follows three couples: Marcus and Angela, Joseph and Leslie, and Richard and Keisha, who are at various stages of their relationships, as they go through the ups-and-downs of married life and dating.

On February 20, 2013 it was announced that TBS had opted not to renew the series, and that the Oprah Winfrey Network had since ordered a third season as part of a new deal the network made with Perry.

After leaving TBS, OWN had aired episodes of For Better or Worse from 2013–2017.

== Series overview ==
Season	Episodes		Originally released		
Season	Episodes		First released	Last released	Network
1	10		November 25, 2011	December 23, 2011	TBS
2	35		July 13, 2012	December 7, 2012	TBS
3	55	26	September 18, 2013	December 11, 2013	OWN
3	55	15	April 9, 2014	June 11, 2014	OWN
3	55	14	September 17, 2014	December 17, 2014	OWN
4	22	11	March 27, 2015	June 5, 2015	OWN
4	22	11	September 11, 2015	October 16, 2015	OWN
5	20	10	April 1, 2016	May 27, 2016	OWN
5	20	10	September 30, 2016	November 25, 2016	OWN
6	20		June 10, 2017	July 22, 2017	OWN

== Episodes ==
=== Season 1 (2011) ===
No. overall	No. in season	Title	Original release date	US viewers (millions)
1	1	"A Better Me"	November 25, 2011	3.33
In the series premiere, all hell breaks loose when Dominique, Angela's step daughter, calls Angela a whore in front of M.J., Angela's son. Angela is sure that the little girl picked up such language from her mother. When Keisha, Marcus’ baby momma shows up at Angela's house, the confrontation turns into a knock down drag out fight.
2	2	"One Last Try"	November 25, 2011	3.42
At a dinner hosted by Joseph and Leslie, there is tension between Richard and Marcus. Richard reveals that Marcus begged Keisha to get back with him the night before he married Angela. Angela is upset that Marcus did not reveal the information during a history box exercise where all secrets were supposed to have been shared between the two. Secretly, Keisha shows up and tells Marcus that she is still in love with him. Leslie witnesses part of the exchange, unseen by Marcus and Keisha.
3	3	"The One I Want"	December 2, 2011	2.04
Leslie battles with whether or not she should tell Angela about what she saw between Marcus and Keisha. Instead Leslie reveals her secret to Jennifer. Marcus is uncomfortable about the fact that Angela and Keisha are becoming friends. As the episode closes, it is clear that Marcus and Angela are very happy together, and so is their beautiful family.
4	4	"Deceiving Eyes"	December 2, 2011	2.01
Leslie is conflicted about whether she should tell Angela that she saw Marcus and Keisha in a weird moment. She believes they may have been kissing. After confiding in Joseph, Leslie decides to keep it a secret. The secret is let out of the bag when Keisha shows up to a pool party hosted by Angela.
5	5	"Forsaking All Others"	December 9, 2011	2.14
Angela receives a certified letter in the mail asking for child support. Angela assumes the letter is from Keisha. When Angela confronts Keisha she learns that the claim was filed by a woman named Sabrina Murphy. Marcus does not know who the woman is. Angela reveals that she was sent a picture of Marcus in bed with the woman.
6	6	"To Lie Or Not To Lie"	December 9, 2011	2.35
Angela tries to deal with her emotions following a letter where a woman claims that Marcus has fathered a child with her. At the salon Angela is messing up her clients' hair because she is so distraught. Leslie and Jennifer try to give her advice. Later that night, Marcus prepares a bath adorned with flowers and candles in an attempt to make up with Angela. His expression of love is mistaken for a scheme to hide a lie.
7	7	"For Baby Mama Drama"	December 16, 2011	2.19
Marcus starts to lose his tenacity at work because of the issues he's having with Angela after the Sabrina Murphy incident. Marcus goes to the salon to talk with Angela. He believes the picture of him in bed with Sabrina Murphy was taken at a bachelor party when he was drunk. A fed-up Angela takes her frustrations out on Marcus' possessions by setting his car and clothes on fire. Note: The end of this episode references the 1995 film Waiting to Exhale.
8	8	"Speak Now"	December 16, 2011	2.37
While trying to deal with Marcus' alleged infidelity, Angela meets Tyrik, a contractor who says he slept with her thirteen years ago when she was drunk. Angela does not remember the exchange until after an argument with Marcus, where he discovers the truth in Tyrik's allegation.
9	9	"For Richer or Poorer"	December 23, 2011	2.04
Marcus still refuses to leave his house, even sleeping in bed with Angela against her wishes. Marcus buys a new Porsche and a new wardrobe. Angela later finds out that Marcus stole her money to replace his items. Angela is heartbroken that Marcus took her money. She moves out and goes to stay with Leslie and Joseph.
10	10	"To Believe or Not To Believe"	December 23, 2011	2.15
Angela has stayed with Leslie and Joseph for the night. Marcus must explain to M.J. why he has experienced so much fighting between himself and Angela. When Angela arrives to get a change of clothes, Miss V. risks her job and tells Angela about how she's acting, and that she needs to trust Marcus. Marcus returns the money he stole from Angela. Angela decides to believe Marcus and forgive him.

=== Season 2 (2012) ===
No. overall	No. in season	Title	Original release date	US viewers (millions)
11	1	"Waiting for Larry White"	July 13, 2012	2.09
Angela still doubts Marcus' fidelity, so she pays Sabrina Murphy a visit. She learns that Marcus was actually telling the truth. Marcus is disappointed when he discovers that Angela doubted him and had to go to Sabrina for the truth. Tyrik is officially hired to renovate the salon.
12	2	"You Are the Father"	July 13, 2012	2.25
Haunted by a one-night stand she had fourteen years ago, Angela is horrified when Tyrik's mom has an uncanny resemblance to M.J. This uncertainty forces Angela to take drastic steps to attain DNA samples. It is revealed that Tyrik cannot have children, so M.J. is indeed Marcus' son. Also, Marcus, Joseph, and Todd are frustrated by Keisha's incessant presence at the studio.
13	3	"The Blind Date"	July 20, 2012	2.01
After Jennifer reveals she is once again seeing Tommy's father, Angela and Leslie are worried. As a result, they decide to set Jennifer up on a blind dinner date. Angela and Leslie coerce Marcus and Joseph to find some guy friends as blind date candidates. The evening backfires when the guys turn out to be jerks.
14	4	"Just Say No"	July 20, 2012	2.19
Angela gives Miss V. the day off because she looks extremely tired. Angela finds a joint by M.J.'s door and fears the worst. It is later revealed that the joint actually belongs to Miss V., who has cancer.
15	5	"The Will and the Grace"	July 27, 2012	1.68
Angela has dinner with her longtime college friend, Nick. Angela told Marcus in college that Nick was gay so she could hang out with him. Marcus finds out that Nick is not gay. Marcus confronts Nick and Angela about their deception.
16	6	"The Engagement Ring"	July 27, 2012	1.68
Richard reveals that he is going to quickly marry Keisha. Marcus questions Keisha's intentions and suggests a prenuptial agreement. Joseph helps Richard with procuring an engagement ring. Leslie mistakenly thinks the engagement ring is for her. Keisha says "yes" to Richard's proposal.
17	7	"The Grand Opening"	August 3, 2012	1.74
Angela is having a "Grand Opening" to celebrate the expansion of the salon being complete. Angela decides to invite Tyrik even after being warned against it by Jennifer and Leslie. In a weird twist of fate, Keisha and Tyrik are old friends, and see each other at the event. Once Keisha discovers that Angela's old fling completed the renovation, she is more than eager to let Marcus know about it. Marcus becomes furious that Tyrik is there, and decides to leave the event.
18	8	"The New Employee"	August 3, 2012	1.60
Richard is having some personal financial problems due to Keisha's spending. In order to help this matter, Richard wants Keisha to work at C-Sports Now as an accountant. Joseph supports Richard's decision. However, Marcus is absolutely against the decision. Marcus, Angela, and Leslie think it's a terrible idea and confront Richard and Keisha. Keisha lets Richard know that she doesn’t want to work at C-Sports Now; in fact, she doesn't want to work anywhere. Also, Leslie struggles with Joseph's perspective on their relationship.
19	9	"Close But No Cigar"	August 10, 2012	1.59
Leslie has a pregnancy scare. Joseph's reaction makes Leslie have serious doubts about their relationship. Joseph is scared and fears being "tied down." Leslie later discovers that she is not pregnant. Although she is relieved, she is heartbroken by what the pregnancy scare has exposed about Joseph's commitment.
20	10	"Mommy Dearest"	August 10, 2012	1.75
An excited Tina is looking forward to attending a party, but Jennifer has made plans to go on a date. Jennifer expects Tina to cancel her plans and stay home to watch her brother. Tina refuses and becomes very disrespectful to her mother. After a heated argument, Jennifer kicks Tina out of the house. Tina goes to Marcus and Angela's house to spend the night. The next day, Tina gets much needed advice from Miss V., who gives her a lesson about compromise, sacrifice, and respect.
21	11	"Biological Clock"	August 17, 2012	1.18
It is Leslie's birthday and she does not want to be reminded about getting older. When Leslie sees a wedding party at Angela's Salon, it prompts genuine desires of wanting to be married and have a family. Leslie is conflicted as the birthday reminds her that she has not done all she had hoped to do in her life.
22	12	"Jack and Jennifer"	August 17, 2012	1.26
Leslie tries to set Jennifer up on a blind date with Jack. Due to the last blind date disaster, Angela and Leslie disguise the date as a simple lunch at Ozzie's Pub. Nevertheless, Jennifer sees right through their plan and decides to be rude to Jack. When Jennifer realizes that Jack was unaware of Angela and Leslie's plan, she decides to seek Jack out and apologize.
23	13	"Tommy"	August 24, 2012	1.60
Jennifer discovers that her son, Tommy, is trying on makeup and wearing heels. She is afraid that he may be gay. In an attempt to counteract his behavior, she pleads with Marcus and Joseph to spend some time with Tommy. Angela and Leslie let Jennifer know that regardless of his sexual orientation or interests, Tommy deserves her love.
24	14	"Joseph's Limp"	August 24, 2012	1.67
Joseph is unable to perform while he and Leslie are being intimate.
25	15	"The Bachelor Party"	August 31, 2012	1.43
Richard's bachelor party gets going only after Angela, Leslie and Jennifer leave.
26	16	"You Are Not the Father"	August 31, 2012	1.53
Under the care of Keisha, Dominique falls off the balcony at Richard's place and has to be rushed to the hospital. Meanwhile Marcus finds out that he's not the father of Dominique at the hospital.
27	17	"Just the Two of Us: Part 1"	September 7, 2012	1.02
Angela convinces Marcus to spend the entire weekend alone with her. She feels this time together will help them improve their communication and strengthen their marriage. Although Marcus is hesitant, he ultimately agrees. Angela reveals that she yearns to have another baby.
28	18	"Just the Two of Us: Part 2"	September 7, 2012	1.20
Angela begins to drive Marcus crazy. Marcus is not too excited about having another child and tries to avoid the conversation like the plague. Finally as the weekend ends, Marcus uses reverse psychology on Angela. He reminds her of all the problems she had during her pregnancy. Angela decides to think more about whether she really wants to have another child.
29	19	"To Be Born Again"	September 14, 2012	1.35
Joseph suspects that Leslie is cheating, but he gets an unexpected response when he confronts her about the issue.
30	20	"In the Red"	September 14, 2012	1.44
The guys suspect Richard of spending company finances when checks begin to bounce.
31	21	"Tall M.J."	September 21, 2012	1.45
Because of M.J.'s short stature, Marcus suspects that M.J. is not his biological son.
32	22	"Off the Hook"	September 21, 2012	1.62
Keisha lets Marcus stop paying child support for Dominique since he is not her biological father.
33	23	"Anniversary Sorrow"	September 28, 2012	1.32
Marcus pretends to forget his anniversary, then sets out to surprise Angela by giving her a diamond ring — but his plan soon backfires.
34	24	"When Jenny Meets Harold: Part 1"	September 28, 2012	1.53
Jennifer falls for a new man, but her friends suspect he has hidden motives.
35	25	"When Jenny Meets Harold: Part 2"	October 19, 2012	1.15
Jennifer is forced to reflect on her choices after being intimate with a new man becomes a frightening ordeal.
36	26	"Momma's Boy"	October 19, 2012	1.24
Joseph is caught off guard when he discovers his mother is planning a visit and in the process, brushes Leslie off.
37	27	"Mi Casa, Su Casa"	October 26, 2012	1.30
Leslie temporarily moves in with Angela and Marcus in the wake of her fight with Joseph.
38	28	"Leslie's First Date"	October 26, 2012	1.26
Leslie wades back into the dating pool while still living with Angela and Marcus.
39	29	"Moving On"	November 2, 2012	1.26
Leslie tries to move on from her breakup and goes on a blind date.
40	30	"Who Gets the Friends?"	November 9, 2012	1.36
Leslie happens upon a man she used to date, and Joseph has a new love interest.
41	31	"The Grand Old Opera"	November 16, 2012	1.15
A rich former classmate arrives and is attracted to Leslie. Complications arise when he also works on a business venture with Joseph.
42	32	"You Should've Put a Ring On It"	November 23, 2012	1.08
Still reeling from their breakup, Joseph comes to realise that he needs to talk to Leslie about getting back together. Much to his surprise, Leslie is engaged to Chris.
43	33	"Prenup"	November 30, 2012	1.42
After meeting Chris and talking of his upcoming engagement, Keisha warns him to get a prenup. When Chris discusses it with Leslie, she's fine with it. However, Chris is surprised when she wants him to sign one too.
44	34	"The Truth Stings"	December 7, 2012	1.07
With Keisha's meddling, Chris finds out that Joseph and Leslie were more serious than she let on. Later Joseph crashes their engagement party, causing tension for Chris and Leslie.
45	35	"The Big Day"	December 7, 2012	1.31
It's Chris and Leslie's wedding day. Angela and Jennifer are happy for Leslie, but Angela perceives that all is not well with Leslie. Meanwhile, Marcus tries to be there for Joseph, but he isn't making it easy, with devastating results.

=== Season 3 (2013–14) ===
During the third season, the show runs on OWN until 2017, when the show ended.

No. overall	No. in season	Title	Original release date	US viewers (millions)
46	1	"The Runaway Bride: Part 1"	September 18, 2013	1.52
Leslie decides to call off the wedding after Joseph's recent motorcycle accident.
47	2	"The Runaway Bride: Part 2"	September 18, 2013	1.55
Chris and Leslie's tension rises after Keisha makes things worse. Chris finds out that Leslie has a difficult time choosing what she wants.
48	3	"The Ex"	September 25, 2013	1.06
Marcus receives an apology from Richard after his problems with Keisha. Joseph gets the okay to go home from the hospital.
49	4	"Can We Talk"	September 25, 2013	1.11
Joseph finally arrives back home to start his recovery. Marcus discovers that Chris and Leslie have been invited to the house by Angela. Chris suggests that Leslie talk with Joseph.
50	5	"Leslie Christian"	October 2, 2013	0.95
Joseph receives a call from a woman that reveals some surprises. Chris comes to the conclusion that it's best for him and Leslie to spend some time apart.
51	6	"Joseph"	October 2, 2013	0.95
After returning from her honeymoon, Leslie feels even more stressed than before after she calls Chris by Joseph's name.
52	7	"Back Down Memory Lane"	October 9, 2013	0.82
When Jennifer informs Angela of an elderly couple's struggle with Alzheimer's, Angela immediately begins to reflect on the good times she's had with Marcus back then.This prompts her to question Marcus' memory of their relationship by playing a memory game. Although Marcus initially rejects Angela's attempt to include him in the game, he later gives in and initiates a version of the memory game himself. Afterward, Angela realizes that Marcus remembers the good times after all.
53	8	"The Stalker"	October 9, 2013	0.83
Joseph has obtained one of Leslie's old calendars and is tracking her movements so he can "accidentally" run into her. When Angela becomes aware of what he's up to, she bumps up Leslie's appointment time at the salon. However, Joseph does eventually run into Leslie at the salon, but she leaves without talking to him. Later, at the offices of C-Sports Now, Joseph's co-workers figure out what he's been up to when he leaves to get lunch and is gone for three hours. Convinced of how unhealthy his behavior has been, Marcus and Richard try to talk some sense into their troubled friend.
54	9	"House for Sale"	October 16, 2013	1.01
Leslie is about to show a house to a potential client and is shocked when the man who walks through the door is none other than Joseph. He manipulated his way to get Leslie alone so he could plead for another chance with her. Although Joseph kisses Leslie in a moment of desperation, she still sticks to her guns and resists his passionate advance. Meanwhile, Richard is tired of Keisha's spending habits and decides to put her on an allowance.
55	10	"The Kiss"	October 16, 2013	1.11
Leslie arrives at Lady Angie's, distraught after she shared an intimate kiss with Joseph. Apparently, Joseph manipulated his way into getting Leslie alone and grabbed and kissed her passionately. Leslie divulges the details of the encounter to Angela and Jennifer as they discuss how she should handle this situation. Leslie also realizes that she is still in love with Joseph and doesn't know what to do.
56	11	"Maybe We Made a Mistake"	October 23, 2013	0.87
Angela's patience wears thin when Joseph overstays his welcome after his accident. Afraid to upset Joseph in his fragile condition, Marcus enlists Richard's help, who then reluctantly invites Joseph out to dinner with Keisha and him. At the same time, Leslie makes plans to meet Chris for dinner for the first time since their honeymoon. Leslie assumes that Chris wants to have their marriage annulled; however, Chris really wants to ask Leslie for a do-over. To make matters even more awkward, Joseph unexpectedly runs into Leslie and Chris at the restaurant while playing the third wheel on Richard and Keisha's date.
57	12	"Annulled"	October 23, 2013	0.91
Leslie discloses to her friends that she and Chris are going to get their marriage annulled. After the annulment is complete, she happens to run into Keisha at the office of her high-end divorce attorney. Although Keisha taunts Leslie about her current situation, she also alludes to the idea that she is working on a scheme to get revenge.
58	13	"The Beauty Pageant"	October 30, 2013	0.85
Todd decides to start a Miss C-Sports Now pageant at the studio to help get Joseph's mind off Leslie. Joseph is not amused by Todd's shenanigans and tells Richard to put an end to the pageant. The guys then discover that doing so may not be so easy when they realize that they could be held liable if no winner is crowned. Meanwhile, the beauty of one of the contestants has enthralled Richard. When his wife, Keisha, arrives at the studio and demands that he shut down the pageant, Richard refuses, and an argument ensues that exposes their crumbling relationship.
59	14	"Trouble in Paradise"	October 30, 2013	0.86
Upon arriving at Lady Angie's Salon, Leslie sees Keisha sitting in her car crying. Eventually, Keisha comes into the salon and tells Angela that Marcus and the guys have a bunch of women over at the C-Sports Now studio. Angela doesn't believe Keisha, so Keisha convinces her to go over to the studio and see for herself. When Angela arrives at the studio, Marcus is forthright and tells her about Todd's plan to use the pageant to hook Joseph up with a woman. After Angela calmly accepts Marcus' explanation, Keisha unintentionally reveals her true motive, which was for Angela to come shut down the pageant because Richard wouldn't. However, once Angela sees the beautiful contestants in bikinis, she does exactly what Keisha had hoped by kicking all the beautiful women out of the newsroom.
60	15	"Move the Money"	November 6, 2013	0.89
To prevent Keisha from having access to C-Sports Now finances, Marcus insists that the guys move their company accounts to another bank. Also, the guys find out that Richard is still distraught about his failing marriage to Keisha. Afterward, Joseph attempts to get Richard to open up about his relationship.
61	16	"You're Under Arrest — Part 1"	November 6, 2013	0.94
A heated argument ensues when Keisha barges into a C-Sports Now meeting to confront Richard about closing the business accounts. Marcus explains to Joseph and Todd that Keisha is building her case to divorce Richard. In the midst of their argument, Keisha accuses Richard of hitting her. Marcus, Joseph and Todd get caught in Keisha's web of deceit after they try to defuse the situation. Keisha then calls the police and has all the guys arrested.
62	17	"You're Under Arrest — Part 2"	November 13, 2013	1.06
Angela calls Leslie and Jennifer in the middle of the night to help her track down Marcus. Concerned after none of the guys answer their phones, Angela takes a trip over to the C-Sports Now studio with Leslie and Jennifer. Upon arrival, the ladies find Marcus and Joseph's cellphones, and all of the guys' cars are still in the parking lot. Afraid that something terrible has happened, the ladies head to the police station to report them missing, but they aren't there long before they run into Keisha. When confronted about her business at the station, Keisha reveals that she had the guys arrested.
63	18	"Stay Out of It"	November 13, 2013	1.23
Marcus tells Angela to stay out of Keisha's business, but Angela meets Keisha anyway, claiming that Marcus is her business.
64	19	"The Exam"	November 20, 2013	0.88
In order to maintain their health coverage at C-Sports Now, Richard, Marcus and Joseph, being in their 40s, must go in for colonoscopies and prostate exams. However, when Todd reveals that his father had prostate cancer, the other guys bring him to get tested as well. After the exams, everyone is relieved when they all receive positive results.
65	20	"Keisha's Up to Something"	November 20, 2013	0.92
Keisha maliciously informs Joseph that Leslie's marriage to Chris has been annulled. With this information, Joseph feels he has an opportunity to reunite with his ex. Then, the revelations keep coming as Leslie informs the girls that she saw Keisha at a divorce attorney's office. Later, the gang witnesses an argument between Keisha and Richard that exposes the true nature of their relationship.
66	21	"The Unknown Caller"	November 27, 2013	N/A
Leslie is wazzed off when some unknown stalker is constantly calling her and she most likely thinks that the person is Joseph. Joseph is determined to help Leslie fix the problem but Leslie is not interested.
67	22	"The Automatic Teller Machine — Part 1"	November 27, 2013	N/A
Keisha meets a man named Eric (Brian White) while trapped in the ATM room and then begins to kiss him, with the guys catching her in the act.
68	23	"The Automatic Teller Machine — Part 2"	December 4, 2013	0.90
Keisha and Eric (Brian White) are caught by Richard, Todd, Joseph, and Marcus and Richard announces that he wants a divorce.
69	24	"A Woman Scorned"	December 4, 2013	0.81
The girls look back at past relationships that they learned from while Joseph and Marcus try to advise Richard to walk away from Keisha.
70	25	"Sleep Talking"	December 11, 2013	0.97
Marcus is caught talking about another woman in his sleep, making Angela extremely angry.
71	26	"Stalked — Part 1"	December 11, 2013	0.91
Joseph worries that Leslie is in danger and his suspicions are right, when Leslie's newest client is revealed to be her stalker.
72	27	"Stalked — Part 2"	April 9, 2014	0.93
Joseph shows up at Marcus and Angela's house in the middle of the night, frantically searching for Leslie. Convinced that Leslie is in danger, Joseph and Marcus go to the addresses of the houses that Leslie was scheduled to show earlier in the day. Joseph arrives at the house where Leslie has been held captive just in time to save her from a deranged stalker.
73	28	"Joseph In Shining Armor"	April 9, 2014	0.92
Angela, Marcus, Joseph and Jennifer comfort Leslie in the aftermath of her stalker ordeal. Since the man who held Leslie captive is still on the loose, Marcus hires a security guard to keep watch over Lady Angie's Salon. Then, everyone learns that Joseph has purchased his and Leslie's dream house, where Joseph insists that Leslie stay until the stalker is captured. Joseph brings Leslie home to his new house so he can keep watch over her until the danger has passed.
74	29	"Reunited"	April 16, 2014	0.46
After spending the night at Joseph's house, Leslie and he begin to restore their friendship. They discuss her brief marriage, and Joseph continues to plead his case that they should get back together. Leslie says it will take a violinist and Brenda Russell singing "Get Here" to reunite them. Later, when Leslie arrives home, she finds violinists and Brenda Russell in her living room. Joseph has spared no expense in trying to win back her heart.
75	30	"A Stalker For Hire"	April 23, 2014	0.69
The guys and Jennifer believe that Joseph might have hired Leslie's stalker so he could come to her rescue and win her back. When Jennifer expresses her suspicions about Joseph to Leslie, Leslie confronts him and questions his motives. After Joseph denies any involvement with Leslie's stalker, she apologizes and decides to spend the night with him.
76	31	"Being Responsible"	April 23, 2014	N/A
Angela gets a call from the doctor's office saying that Jennifer never showed up for her follow-up appointment to get tested for HIV. Concerned about Jennifer's well-being, Leslie and Angela go to her house to try and convince her to go to the doctor. After their unsuccessful attempt, Leslie decides to invite an HIV-positive woman to the salon to talk to Jennifer about the importance of overcoming her fear of getting tested.
77	32	"Joseph Gets Tested"	April 30, 2014	0.77
Once Leslie learns of Joseph's indiscretions during their time apart, she suggests that he get tested for sexually transmitted diseases. He agrees to do so, but only after he gets some much-needed advice from Marcus. Later, Joseph reveals to Leslie that he actually slept with a myriad of women while he was separated from her.
78	33	"How Many Women?"	April 30, 2014	0.83
While Angela, Leslie and Jennifer enjoy a ladies' night out, Leslie reveals that she asked Joseph how many women he'd slept with while they had been separated. This inspires Angela to go home and ask Marcus how many women he's had sex with. Her husband's refusal to answer the question riles Angela, but she quickly changes her tune when Marcus turns the tables and asks her how many men she's slept with.
79	34	"Todd and Jennifer"	May 7, 2014	N/A
After Todd drinks too much at Jennifer's dinner party, she lets him sleep it off on her couch. In the middle of the night, Todd sleepwalks into Jennifer's room and gets into her bed. When they wake up the next morning, Todd thinks he's had mind-blowing sex with Jennifer because of his dream, and she lets him believe that they were intimate when he offers to take her out. Ultimately, Jennifer tells Todd the truth: They did not sleep together. However, she warns him about the dangers of living on the wild side.
80	35	"Moving Day"	May 7, 2014	N/A
Leslie seeks the assistance of Angela and Jennifer to help finish decorating Joseph's house before he returns home. Although Leslie is orchestrating the furnishing of the house, she emphatically denies any intentions of living there. Later, Joseph sees the décor and suggests that Leslie move in with him.
81	36	"The Proposal"	May 14, 2014	0.82
Joseph decides that he wants to propose to Leslie. First, though, he attempts to solicit information from Angela and Jennifer about how Chris popped the question to Leslie, who finds out from the girls that Joseph may be planning to ask for her hand. Later, Joseph has to explain why he didn't propose to her days earlier, but, in the end, he gets down on bended knee.
82	37	"The Taming of Todd"	May 14, 2014	0.95
Marcus thinks that it's time for Todd to meet a nice girl and settle down, so he convinces Angela to help set Todd up on a blind date with M.J.'s former tutor, Nina. When Todd meets Nina, his crass behavior turns her off, but he finally admits that he was acting out because he didn't think she would be interested in him. After Todd changes his approach, Nina reveals that she actually thinks he's cute, and she decides to give him a chance.
83	38	"Marcus and Dominique"	May 21, 2014	N/A
Keisha shows up at the offices of C-Sports Now and asks Marcus to spend some time with her daughter, Dominique. In fact, the girl has been calling Marcus, whom she still believes to be her biological father, to talk about how Keisha and Richard's messy divorce is affecting her. Marcus agrees to see Dominique out of concern for her and decides to keep the secret that he is not her father — but he lets Keisha know that she must tell Dominique soon.
84	39	"For the Love of Dominique"	May 28, 2014	1.10
Marcus informs Angela that Dominique is coming to visit him for the weekend. Angela agrees to the visit but emphasizes to Marcus that Dominique needs to know the truth: that he is not her biological father. When Keisha and Dominique arrive, Angela gives Keisha an ultimatum that prompts her to terminate the visit. Later, Marcus reveals to Angela that he still loves Dominique, regardless of whether he has any legal responsibility to her.
85	40	"Who's My Daddy? - Part 1"	June 4, 2014	1.04
During one of Richard and Keisha's many arguments, Dominique accidentally overhears them admit that Marcus is not her father. Dominique then goes to Angela's salon, looking for answers from Marcus. When Angela calls Keisha about Dominique's whereabouts, Dominique storms out of the salon in frustration. Later, it is revealed that Dominique is missing.
86	41	"Who's My Daddy? - Part 2"	June 11, 2014	1.10
Angela explains to Marcus that Dominique came by the salon looking for him earlier in the day. That night, Keisha shows up at Marcus and Angela's home, looking for Dominique, who has gone missing. Keisha reveals that her daughter has run away because Richard told Dominique that Marcus is not her father. Angela reluctantly lets Marcus go with Keisha to search for Dominique, but they are unsuccessful. At last, a police officer brings Dominique home. Marcus sits her down and reassures her that although he is not her biological father, he will always be her daddy.
87	42	"Too Much Sex"	September 17, 2014	1.20
Marcus overwhelms Angela when his sex drive suddenly rivals that of his college days. After Angela tells the ladies at the salon about her husband's newfound spark, and Jennifer convinces her that Marcus is fantasizing about another woman. Meanwhile, at the offices of C-Sports Now, Joseph and Todd are searching for some missing fertility pills for Leslie's dog when Richard notices that the pill bottle is strikingly similar to Marcus' vitamins.
88	43	"Shawn – Part 1"	September 24, 2014	1.15
A pregnant woman named Shawn (Logan Browning) claims that Marcus is the father of her unborn child.
89	44	"Shawn – Part 2"	October 1, 2014	N/A
Todd discovers that the newly arrived Shawn (Logan Browning) is carrying his child, not Marcus'.
90	45	"The Divorce Papers"	October 8, 2014	N/A
Fed up, Keisha moves out of the house after serving Richard with divorce papers.
91	46	"It's My House"	October 15, 2014	N/A
Richard does all he can to make sure that Keisha doesn't take everything that belongs to him.
92	47	"The Restraining Order"	October 22, 2014	N/A
Keisha retaliates by serving Richard with a restraining order; Marcus brings in an attorney.
93	48	"Please Say Yes"	October 29, 2014	N/A
Joseph tries to come up with a proposal idea for Leslie; he finds himself struggling.
94	49	"Leslie, Joseph and the Prenup"	November 5, 2014	N/A
Joseph is not a punk; therefore, he asks Leslie to sign a prenuptial agreement.
95	50	"Keisha, the Photographer"	November 12, 2014	N/A
Keisha wants to know if Richard is hiding any of his assets; she hires a photographer to take pictures of C-Sports, Lady Angie's salon, and Leslie's workplace.
96	51	"What About Kids?"	November 19, 2014	N/A
Joseph waits until after proposing to tell Leslie that he does not want children anytime soon.
97	52	"The Mammogram – Part 1"	November 26, 2014	N/A
For Breast Cancer Awareness Month, Leslie talks the other women into getting mammograms.
98	53	"The Mammogram – Part 2"	December 3, 2014	N/A
Angela struggles to tell Marcus about the results of her mammogram.
99	54	"Fear of the Unknown"	December 10, 2014	N/A
Angela's doctor tries to convince her to undergo a biopsy when a mass appears on her x-ray.
100	55	"I Want Half"	December 17, 2014	N/A
Richard is convinced that Keisha managed to set him up after he misses a court date.

=== Season 4 (2015) ===
No. overall	No. in season	Title	Original release date	US viewers (millions)
101	1	"Told You So"	March 27, 2015	0.78
The season picks up with everyone's reaction to the divorce settlement between Keisha and Richard. Richard is staying with Angela and Marcus. The fact that Keisha was awarded half of C-Sports Now makes them all extremely uneasy. Richard is devastated that he has lost half of everything, and to top it all off, Keisha got the house, so he doesn't even have a place to live. A seemingly sympathetic Marcus offers to let Richard stay at his house without consulting Angela. However, Marcus' true motives are revealed when Richard overhears Marcus and Angela talking: Marcus is secretly basking in Richard's misery.
102	2	"Who Got the Keys?"	April 3, 2015	0.70
Still reeling from his catastrophic divorce settlement, Richard has nowhere to go, so Marcus steps up as a true friend and allows him to stay at his house. Later, when the guys arrive at work, they realize that Keisha has changed the locks on the studio door. With no other way to get in, an outraged Richard rams the door, trying to break it down, and ends up seriously injuring his back.
103	3	"Healing Hands"	April 10, 2015	0.77
After hurting his back at work, Richard becomes the invalid houseguest from hell. His hosts, Marcus and Angela, go to Leslie and Joseph for help because he is driving them crazy. When they leave Richard alone with Miss V., however, she refuses to cater to him — and inadvertently heals his back when she "lays hands" on him.
104	4	"A Few Days"	April 17, 2015	0.72
Richard is having a hard time sleeping in the wake of his divorce. He feels like a fool for not heeding Marcus' advice about Keisha, and he vows to get even with her for playing him. In the meantime, Richard has to bear the indignity of seeing Keisha every day, since she was awarded part ownership of C-Sports Now as part of the settlement. Keisha doesn't waste any time inserting herself into the day-to-day operations of the studio.
105	5	"Keisha's Corner"	April 24, 2015	0.64
Keisha finally lets Marcus, Joseph and Richard back into their studio after having it locked all weekend. When the men enter, however, they discover that some additions have been made to the C-Sports Now set. The extension is frilly and pink, and above it is a big sign that reads "Keisha's Corner." Surprise! Keisha has given herself her own segment.
106	6	"Choke Her to Sleep"	May 1, 2015	0.79
Richard is furious when he discovers that Keisha has taken his car as part of the divorce settlement. When he arrives at C-Sports Now to confront her, his emotions get the best of him, and he physically assaults her. Keisha has Richard arrested, and the guys have to bail him out of jail. The ladies are irate when they find out, though, and square off with the men over their decision because they are so appalled by Richard's violently abusive behavior.
107	7	"Him or Me"	May 8, 2015	0.65
Angela is getting fed up with Richard's annoying presence in her home. She gives Marcus an ultimatum: Richard has to go or else. Marcus refuses to give in to Angela's demands, however, and eventually she realizes how kind her husband is for allowing Richard to continue to stay at their house.
108	8	"Victemetrea"	May 15, 2015	0.71
Leslie has plans to meet with a wedding planner on the same day that Joseph wants to go to the big game with the guys. Marcus convinces Joseph to go to the meeting with the wedding planner so that he can keep Leslie from exceeding their budget. When Joseph arrives at the meeting, he is introduced to Victemetrea, an over-the-top wedding planner to the stars.
109	9	"Angela Maintains Control"	May 22, 2015	0.65
Keisha continues to be a thorn in the guys' sides when she decides to add more desks in the C-Sports Now office. Angela wonders why Marcus has put up with Keisha's meddling at work, and, having finally had enough, goes to the studio herself. Surprisingly, Angela maintains control and decides not to engage in her typical behavior.
110	10	"A Certified Letter"	May 29, 2015	0.80
Marcus receives a certified letter stating that he's behind on child support. At the salon, Angela also gets a certified letter about her husband's allegedly delinquent child-support status. Not wanting to overreact, Angela calmly addresses Marcus about these allegations and decides to get to the bottom of the matter before jumping to any conclusions.
111	11	"Pam's Father"	June 5, 2015	0.84
Marcus receives a certified letter, which scares the wits out of Angela and Jennifer before they even open it. Upon reading it, they discover that Marcus is alleged to have a child that no one knew about. Angela secretly arranges a meeting to find out who is behind the claim. Later, Angela and Marcus are shocked when a young girl named Pam arrives and proclaims that Marcus is her father.
112	12	"Seventeen"	September 11, 2015	1.11
Marcus and Angela try to bond with Pam, the girl that claims to be Marcus' daughter.
113	13	"Maury Settles It"	September 11, 2015	1.22
DNA results prove that Pam was telling the truth and Marcus is her father.
114	14	"Curtis"	September 18, 2015	1.06
Pam introduces Curtis, her pimp, to Marcus and Angela; they know that her life is in danger immediately. Marcus knocks out Curtis. Encourages Curtis to forget about Pam and leave the house before he beats him again. Pam stays with Marcus (her father) and Angela. Angela says she no longer needs to be a prostitute. She can work in Angela's salon.
115	15	"Lock The Door"	September 18, 2015	1.18
Pam shows up at the salon looking for help after realizing that Curtis was behind her disappearance.
116	16	"It's Bedtime"	September 25, 2015	1.17
Angela, Jennifer and Leslie try to protect Pam from Curtis at the salon. Curtis gets arrested.
117	17	"Don't Ignore the Signs"	September 25, 2015	1.14
Richard receives his first post-divorce paycheck.
118	18	"The Way We Were"	October 2, 2015	1.11
The ladies visit C-Sports just in time to overhear Keisha confess her love for Marcus.
119	19	"Trouble with the Feds"	October 2, 2015	1.13
Angela is audited by the IRS after her cousin is arrested for embezzlement and tax fraud.
120	20	"The Results"	October 9, 2015	1.02
Angela's mammogram results are in; she stresses out all day.
121	21	"Richard's Break"	October 9, 2015	1.14
Keisha brings a man to C-Sports while Richard is working late; Richard loses his head.
122	22	"Making Him Suffer"	October 16, 2015	0.99
Richard learns that there are consequences for abusing a woman.

=== Season 5 (2016) ===
No. overall	No. in season	Title	Original release date	US viewers (millions)
123	1	"Getting Help"	April 1, 2016	0.72
The season picks up with Richard dealing with the consequences for his abuse towards Keisha. While the guys bail him out of jail, the ladies try to talk to Keisha about becoming a better person.
124	2	"Evil is Knocking"	April 1, 2016	0.75
Keisha arrives at Marcus and Angela's house and tries to manipulate a situation for her own advantage.
125	3	"Tomorrow is Not Promised"	April 8, 2016	0.80
When Marcus learns the fate of his former teammate, Jack, the news radically changes his behavior so that one day this don't happen to him. He also tells his friends about Angela's pregnancy.
126	4	"Marsha, Marsha, Marsha"	April 15, 2016	0.76
While babysitting for Jennifer, Angela and Leslie become suspicious when Jennifer becomes secretive about what's going on in her personal life. Jennifer comes home and tells them about her date. Her friend comes in to bring Jennifer's coat and flowers when she left them in the car. The ladies then come into conclusion that Jennifer's date was a woman. While Angela confesses to Miss V, Leslie dishes to Joseph, but later Jennifer reveals to the other ladies that the woman they met was actually the driver of the cab she used on her date.
127	5	"Addicted"	April 22, 2016	0.73
The guys discover that an employee's online behavior was flagged. At first they believe that it's Todd but it turns out to be Richard.
128	6	"It's a Woman's World"	April 29, 2016	0.69
After Leslie and Joseph make incorrect assumptions about each other's jobs, Leslie suggests that Joseph and the rest of the guys go work at Lady Angie's salon, while she and Angela go work at C-Sports Now.
129	7	"Fit for a Fling"	May 6, 2016	0.71
While Keisha and the guys suspect that Marcus might be having an affair when he becomes actively fit, Angela tells Miss V that she is pregnant and Marcus is working out for his wife and his new baby.
130	8	"Two Turtlenecks"	May 13, 2016	0.68
While dealing with his depression over Keisha and the divorce, Richard becomes drunk and knocks on Jennifer's door in the middle of the night in need of comfort and reveals that he wants to have sex with her. Jennifer resists at first, but finally gives in. The next day she comes in to work wearing a turtleneck while Richard comes into work wearing one as well; leading everyone to the conclusion that the two slept together.
131	9	"Against the Wall"	May 20, 2016	0.83
Angela insults Jennifer for sleeping with Richard and Leslie tries to calm the situation. Marcus tries to tell Richard that he was in a vulnerable state and that sleeping with Jennifer was a mistake. Richard tries to confront Jennifer about it, and the two almost give in to temptation again. Meanwhile, the rest of the group comes knocking on Jennifer's door wanting to apologize.
132	10	"True Intentions"	May 27, 2016	0.81
Everyone is shocked when Jennifer is caught with Richard in her house and when Marcus tells Richard to tell Jennifer that their intimate relationship was a mistake, Jennifer is upset and kicks them all out. Later at Angela and Marcus's, Richard reveals his true feelings for Jennifer and that he really wants to be with her, leading the other couples to regret how they acted. The next day at the salon, Angela and Leslie try to apologize to Jennifer again, but they notice her schedule's been cleared along with all her things and Jennifer walks in and tells them that she quit.
133	11	"Three Times"	September 30, 2016	0.79
Angela and Leslie try to mend their broken friendship with Jennifer.
134	12	"The Flower Delivery"	September 30, 2016	0.80
Keisha intercepts Richard's gift for his new love interest, Jennifer.
135	13	"Set Her Straight"	October 7, 2016	0.72
Richard tries to put a stop on Keisha's interference in his love life.
136	14	"The Magic Trick"	October 14, 2016	0.50
The guys at the studio fear that Richard has put himself in another precarious situation involving Keisha.
137	15	"Jack"	October 21, 2016	0.69
Marcus deals with the devastating loss of one of his former teammates.
138	16	"Do What You Gotta Do"	October 28, 2016	0.78
Joseph becomes sexually frustrated because of Leslie's vow of chastity.
139	17	"Mating Calls"	November 4, 2016	0.75
Joseph struggles with Leslie's feelings about sex.
140	18	"Mother to Mother"	November 11, 2016	0.77
Joseph and Leslie discuss their mother's socioeconomic status.
141	19	"A Letter From the Attorney"	November 18, 2016	0.86
The gang becomes suspicious when Keisha suddenly begins plotting to win Richard back. They later discover Keisha's motives; Richard has received word in a letter from his attorney that he has become a multi-millionaire due to a stock investment he made ten years prior.
142	20	"Passing the Test"	November 25, 2016	0.98
Angela worries about the health in her pregnancy. Leslie and Jennifer get some shocking news.

=== Season 6 (2017) ===
No. overall	No. in season	Title	Original release date	US viewers (millions)
143	1	"The Big Secret"	June 10, 2017	N/A
Leslie and Jennifer tell their men they’re pregnant. Marcus and Angela worry about having another child at this point of their lives.
144	2	"Bodacious"	June 10, 2017	N/A
The guys are all at odds with their women. They are able to trace their marital woes back to a stripper named Bodacious.
145	3	"And It Starts..."	June 17, 2017	N/A
Marcus reassures Richard and Joseph that these are all normal parts of marital and hormonal trials and tribulations.
146	4	"All Over The Place"	June 17, 2017	N/A
When Angela and Leslie find out that Jennifer doesn't wan't to receive prenatal care, they ask Richard to convince her.
147	5	"Faking It"	June 17, 2017	N/A
The ladies reveal the results of their second home pregnancy tests. And it turns out that they are not pregnant.
148	6	"I Got Her Card"	June 24, 2017	N/A
With the help of a private investigator, Jennifer digs up information on Keisha's past to stop her spiteful plans to take legal action against Richard.
149	7	"I Have Lived"	June 24, 2017	N/A
Marcus' ex-teammate shows up at C-Sports. He then pulls out a gun and threatens to shoot himself in the head.
150	8	"All the Voices"	June 24, 2017	N/A
The guys come to the rescue of William, Marcus' old teammate. Marcus strives to talk William out of killing himself but he won't listen and he ends up shooting himself in the throat.
151	9	"When the Lights Go Out"	July 1, 2017	N/A
After his friend's suicide, Marcus and the gang try to cope.
152	10	"The Misty Vine Hotel"	July 1, 2017	N/A
Angela's history with Marcus' friend Benny is revealed.
153	11	"To Tell or Not to Tell"	July 1, 2017	N/A
Angela has second thoughts about Benny staying at the house.
154	12	"The Alarm"	July 8, 2017	N/A
Angela is restless because of her new house guest; and she is caught kissing Benny and Marcus and his friends walk in on them.
155	13	"Just Happened"	July 8, 2017	N/A
Angela is forced to explain herself, as Marcus questions the strength of Angela's commitment to him.
156	14	"The Way He Looks At Me"	July 8, 2017	N/A
Angela and Marcus' bond is tested.
157	15	"Just A Kiss"	July 15, 2017	N/A
The guys try to convince Marcus to give Angela a pass. As Angela plans to go talk to her husband, she encounters another woman with whom Marcus had flirted. Marcus contemplates getting a divorce lawyer.
158	16	"The Silverback"	July 15, 2017	N/A
Marcus tries to make Angela jealous by hitting on Keisha.
159	17	"Make Him Call Your Name"	July 15, 2017	N/A
As Angela plans to meet up with Benny, the gang try to persuade her not to go; Marcus begins to have second thoughts about making Angela jealous.
160	18	"He's at the Door"	July 22, 2017	N/A
Angela has decided to meet with Benny.
161	19	"A Dangerous Game"	July 22, 2017	N/A
Angela and Marcus decide to play a dangerous game of tit-for-tat.
162	20	"Two Can Play That Game"	July 22, 2017	N/A
In the series finale, Benny reveals a shocking secret to his friend Marcus.
