= College Hill: Celebrity Edition =

Reality streaming television series

- Genre: Reality
- Starring: NeNe Leakes; Ray J; Lamar Odom; Big Freedia; Stacey Dash; DreamDoll; Slim Thug; India Love; Tiffany Pollard; Joseline Hernandez; O'Ryan; Kwaylon "Kway" Rogers; Amber Rose; Iman Shumpert; Parker McKenna Posey; Tamar Braxton; Saucy Santana; Blac Chyna; Karlous Miller; Claudia Jordan; Nick Young
- Country of origin: United States
- Original language: English
- No. of seasons: 3
- No. of episodes: 24

Production
- Executive producers: Tracey Edmonds; Sean Rankine; Mark Seliga
- Production companies: Edmonds Entertainment; This Way Out Media

Original release
- Network: BET+
- Release: June 27, 2022 – August 1, 2024

Related
- College Hill

College Hill: Celebrity Edition is a revival of the BET reality series College Hill, featuring celebrities living together and attending Texas Southern University. The first season's cast includes NeNe Leakes, Ray J, Lamar Odom, Big Freedia, Stacey Dash, DreamDoll, India Love and Slim Thug. The series premiered on BET+ on June 27, 2022.

== Production ==
An early preview of episode one was shown June 26, 2022, after the 2022 BET Awards before the series premiered on BET+.

There were early reports in 2020 of the celebrity reboot with Jackson State University as the host college.

The second season's cast includes returnee Ray J, with Tiffany Pollard, Joseline Hernandez, O'Ryan, Kwaylon "Kway" Rogers, Amber Rose, Iman Shumpert and Parker McKenna. The season premiered on BET+ on May 11, 2023, and is set at Alabama State University in Montgomery, Alabama.

The third season's cast includes Tamar Braxton, Saucy Santana, Blac Chyna, Karlous Miller, Claudia Jordan and Nick Young. The season premiered on June 20, 2024, and is set at Xavier University of Louisiana in New Orleans, Louisiana.

== Cast ==
Main cast members
Cast member	Seasons		
Cast member	1	2	3
Ray J	Main	Main	
NeNe Leakes	Main		
Lamar Odom	Main		
Big Freedia	Main		
Stacey Dash	Main		
DreamDoll	Main		
Slim Thug	Main		
India Love	Main		
Tiffany Pollard		Main	
Joseline Hernandez		Main	
O'Ryan		Main	
Kwaylon "Kway" Rogers		Main	
Amber Rose		Main	
Iman Shumpert		Main	
Parker McKenna Posey		Main	
Tamar Braxton			Main
Saucy Santana			Main
Blac Chyna			Main
Karlous Miller			Main
Claudia Jordan			Main
Nick Young			Main

== Episodes ==
=== Series overview ===
Season	Episodes	Originally released	
Season	Episodes	First released	Last released
1	8	June 27, 2022	August 4, 2022
2	8	May 11, 2023	June 22, 2023
3	8	June 20, 2024	August 1, 2024

=== Season 1 (2022) ===
No. overall	No. in season	Title	Original release date	BET air date	U.S. linear viewers (millions)
1	1	"Welcome to College"	June 27, 2022	August 1, 2023	0.85
2	2	"If You're Green, You're Clean"	June 27, 2022	August 8, 2023	N/A
3	3	"Pig Juices and Excuses"	June 30, 2022	August 15, 2023	0.20
4	4	"Y'all... We Need to Talk About Ray!"	July 7, 2022	August 22, 2023	0.22
5	5	"Back in the Saddle"	July 14, 2022	August 29, 2023	0.19
6	6	"No Comfort Zones Allowed"	July 21, 2022	September 5, 2023	N/A
7	7	"May I Displease the Court?"	July 28, 2022	September 19, 2023	N/A
8	8	"Graduation Day"	August 4, 2022	September 26, 2023	N/A

=== Season 2 (2023) ===
No. overall	No. in season	Title	Original release date	BET air date	U.S. linear viewers (millions)
9	1	"Welcome to the College Hill Family"	May 11, 2023	October 17, 2023	0.23
10	2	"Why Can't We Be Friends"	May 11, 2023	October 24, 2023	N/A
11	3	"Work Hard, Party Harder"	May 18, 2023	October 31, 2023	N/A
12	4	"Masks Off"	May 25, 2023	November 7, 2023	N/A
13	5	"Magic City, Here We Come"	June 1, 2023	November 14, 2023	N/A
14	6	"The Breaking Point"	June 8, 2023	November 21, 2023	N/A
15	7	"It's Hard to say Goodbye"	June 15, 2023	November 28, 2023	N/A
16	8	"We Did That!"	June 22, 2023	December 5, 2023	N/A

=== Season 3 (2024) ===
No. overall	No. in season	Title	Original release date	BET air date	U.S. linear viewers (millions)
17	1	"Bayou Bound and Determined"	June 20, 2024	July 22, 2025	N/A
18	2	"Where's My Mother F'n Baby?"	June 20, 2024	July 29, 2025	N/A
19	3	"Trials, Tribulations, and... Tutors?"	June 27, 2024	August 5, 2025	N/A
20	4	"Lost in the Sauce"	July 4, 2024	August 12, 2025	N/A
21	5	"Mardi Gras Mishaps"	July 11, 2024	August 19, 2025	N/A
22	6	"Them Grades Got The Whole House Shook"	July 18, 2024	August 26, 2025	N/A
23	7	"Don't Get Lost in the Sauce"	July 25, 2024	September 2, 2025	N/A
24	8	"Caps Off"	August 1, 2024	September 9, 2025	N/A
