= Deion's Family Playbook =

American reality television series

- Genre: Reality
- Starring: Deion Sanders; Tracey E. Edmonds
- Country of origin: United States
- Original language: English
- No. of seasons: 3
- No. of episodes: 22

Production
- Executive producers: Deion Sanders; Eli Frankel; Rob Cornick; Tracey E. Edmonds
- Camera setup: Multiple
- Running time: 42 minutes
- Production companies: Edmonds Entertainment; Lionsgate Television; Prime Time Media Ventures; Rogue Atlas Productions

Original release
- Network: Oprah Winfrey Network
- Release: March 1, 2014 – June 27, 2015

Deion's Family Playbook is an American reality television series starring Deion Sanders. It premiered March 1, 2014, on the Oprah Winfrey Network. The first season premiere acquired 711,000 viewers with the finale achieving 946,000 viewers.

In April 2014, Deion's Family Playbook was renewed for a second season. Prime Prep Academy, where Sanders is a founder and a coach, was featured in the series. Season 2 of Deion's Family Playbook premiered on November 1, 2014. Season 3 of Deion's Family Playbook premiered on May 9, 2015. The series ended on June 27, 2015.

== Episodes ==
=== Series overview ===
Season	Episodes	Originally released	
Season	Episodes	First released	Last released
1	6	March 1, 2014	April 5, 2014
2	8	November 1, 2014	December 20, 2014
3	8	May 9, 2015	June 27, 2015

=== Season 1 (2014) ===
No. overall	No. in season	Title	Original release date
1	1	"Life of Prime"	March 1, 2014
2	2	"Bossy's Revenge"	March 8, 2014
3	3	"Dropping Beats and Dropping Balls"	March 15, 2014
4	4	"Mama Drama, Exes and Oprah"	March 22, 2014
5	5	"Everybody Gets Benched"	March 29, 2014
6	6	"Prime and Punishment"	April 5, 2014

=== Season 2 (2014) ===
No. overall	No. in season	Title	Original release date
7	1	"Bed Bugs and Beyond"	November 1, 2014
8	2	"Cry Me a Shower"	November 8, 2014
9	3	"Snoop Dogg Knows Best"	November 15, 2014
10	4	"Young and Restless in LA"	November 22, 2014
11	5	"Prime Prep, We Have a Problem"	November 29, 2014
12	6	"No Place Like Home"	December 6, 2014
13	7	"Packing Up Paradise"	December 13, 2014
14	8	"We're Not in Prosper Anymore"	December 20, 2014

=== Season 3 (2015) ===
No. overall	No. in season	Title	Original release date	U.S. viewers (millions)
15	1	"Connie Takes Charge"	May 9, 2015	0.36
16	2	"Everybody’s Hustling"	May 16, 2015	0.47
17	3	"Shilo’s Gift of Jab"	May 23, 2015	0.39
18	4	"The Getaway"	May 30, 2015	0.59
19	5	"99 Problems and Shedeur Got 1"	June 6, 2015	0.49
20	6	"Civil Rights and Wrongs"	June 13, 2015	0.64
21	7	"For the Love of Moneyyy"	June 20, 2015	0.40
22	8	"Last Days of Prime Prep"	June 27, 2015	0.40
