= Kent Faulcon =

American actor, director, and writer

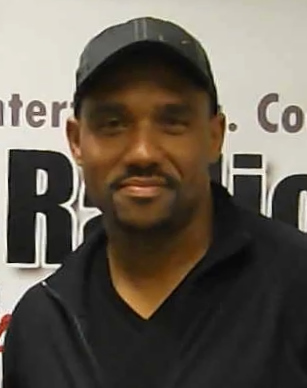
- Kent Faulcon in 2016
- Born: Kent D. Faulcon; 1971 (age 54–55)
- Occupations: Actor, director, writer
- Years active: 1985–present

Kent Faulcon (born 1971) is an American actor, director, and writer. He is known for playing Jake Jensen in Men in Black. He also made several contributions to Black independent film festivals.

== Early life ==
Faulcon was born in 1971 and grew up in Raleigh, North Carolina. Faulcon graduated from University of North Carolina School of the Arts with a bachelor's degree in Fine Arts.

== Career ==
In 1985, Faulcon's acting career started as a child actor in Sparks, a TV series.

== Personal life ==
Faulcon is married with two children.

== Filmography ==
Film
Year	Film	Role	
1989	Dream a Little Dream	Low Life #3	
1995	Die Hard with a Vengeance	Gang Member #3	
1997	Men in Black	2nd Lt. Jake Jensen	
1997	Red Corner	Marine Guard	
1999	American Beauty	Sale House Man #3	
2002	Dragonfly	Paul Reardon	
2002	Bug	The Odwalla Deliveryman	
2002	Solaris	Patient #1	
2004	Strange Fruit	William Boyals	
2005	War of the Worlds	War of the Worlds Soldier	
2014	Selma	Sullivan Jackson	
Television
Year	Title	Role	Episode
1985-1988	Sparks	Nathan	
1996	Sliders	Billy Rae Bledsoe	"The Good, the Bad, and the Wealthy
1998	The Love Boat: The Next Wave	Greg Sanders	"Dust, Lust, Destiny"
1998/2000	JAG	Gunnery Chief (1998), L Cpl. Sheets (2000)	"Going After Francesca" (1998), "Surface Warfare" (2000)
1999	Promised Land	Oscar Davis	"Wounded Hearts", "The Visitor"
2000	NYPD Blue	Randall Dixon	"The Irvin Files"
2000	Charmed	Gil Corso	"Chick Flick", "Murphy's Luck"
2000	Rude Awakening	Henry	"Three Men and a Womb", "Truth Don't Fail Me Now"
2000	Girlfriends	Frank Anderson	"The Importance of Being Frank"
2001	Strong Medicine	Melvis 'Mel' MacRane	"Relief"
2002/2003	Soul Food	Michael King	"Past Imperfect" (2002), "All Together Alone" (2003)
2003	L.A. Dragnet	Det. Kevin Tolan	"The Brass Ring", "All That Glitters"
2004	7th Heaven	Marine Recruiter	"Healing Old Wounds"
2004	Like Family	Dave	"Brother's Keeper"
2004	Joan of Arcadia	Duncan	"The Cat", "Back to the Garden"
2004	NCIS	Cmdr. Reynolds	"Lt. Jane Doe"
2005	24	CHP Officer Pantell	"Day 4: 11:00 a.m.-12:00 p.m."
2005	CSI: Miami	Correctional Officer	"Whacked"
2006	Vanished	Ticket Agent	"Warm Springs"
2007	Criminal Minds	Det. Fuller	"Distress"
2007	Shark	John Ramsey	"Trial by Fire"
2007	Life	Computer Lab Tech	"Powerless"
2007/2008	Lincoln Heights	Straghan	"Suspicion" (2007), "The New Wild Ones" (2008)
2008	Desperate Housewives	Officer Ramsey	"In Buddy's Eyes"
2008	Bones	Dr. Jason Bergman	"The Wannabe in the Weeds"
2008	Boston Legal	Owen Patterson	"The Bad Seed"
2010	Love That Girl!	Brian	"A Fool for You"
2011–2017	Tyler Perry's For Better or Worse	Richard Ellington	

== Awards and nominations ==
Arizona Black Filmmakers Showcase

- Nominated, "Best Film"

Hollywood Black Film Festival

- 2007: Won, "Audience Choice Award" – Sister's Keeper

San Diego Black Film Festival

- Nominated, "Best Film"
- Nominated, "Best Director"

San Francisco Black Film Festival

- Nominated, "Best Film"
- Nominated, "Best Director"

Texas Black Film Festival

- 2008: Won, "Audience Choice Award"
- Nominated, "Best Director"
