= St. Croix Avis =

Defunct US Virgin Islands newspaper

- Format: Weekly
- Founder: Richard Hatchett
- Founded: 1844
- Ceased publication: 2024
- Language: English; Danish
- City: Christiansted, Saint Croix
- Country: Danish West Indies (1844–1917); United States Virgin Islands (1917–2024)

The St. Croix Avis was a weekly newspaper published in the United States Virgin Islands (the Danish West Indies until 1917) between 1844 and 2024. Founded by Richard Hatchett in 1844, the St. Croix Avis was one of the first newspapers local to the Virgin Islands and by 1990 the oldest extant newspaper in the Caribbean. It shut down in 2024 after becoming unable to compete with online news and social media.

== History ==
The St. Croix Avis was founded in 1844 by Richard Hatchett (who was its editor from then until his death in 1851) under the Danish West Indian government; the Virgin Islands were at that time a territory of Denmark called the Danish West Indies. The St. Croix Avis was headquartered in Christiansted on the island of Saint Croix. It was the successor of The Royal Danish American Gazette, which was the first newspaper based in the Virgin Islands.

Logo of the St. Croix Avis in 1865

Harriet Hatchett, Richard Hatchett's wife, took control of the newspaper after Richard's death and owned it until she gave it to Hans Hatchett, a relative of Richard's, in 1852. In 1866 Hans gave his ownership to Peter Hatchett, another relative; Peter ran the paper from 1866 to 1868.

Many of the St. Croix Avis's readers were literate black slaves. In 1836 Governor-General Peter von Scholten had announced the Country School Ordinance, which made education compulsory for enslaved children of the Virgin Islands.

On October 29, 1867, the San Narciso hurricane destroyed the office of another Virgin Islands newspaper, the St Thomas Tidende, but did not affect the St. Croix Avis as the latter's office was 43 miles (69 km) from the Tidende's and avoided the storm's landfall. The St. Croix Avis reported on the hurricane and reproduced letters to the editor from the hurricane's survivors.

Hans regained his editorship in 1868 and kept it until 1876. Afterward the St. Croix Avis went through many owners, namely Lauritz Holm (1872 to 1874), Christian Dahl (1874 to 1877), Julius Knuthsen (six months in 1877), John T. Quin (1877 to 1878), Paludan (Note: Lent spells Muller's first name as Faludan, but other sources list it as Paludan.) Muller (1878 to 1879) and Albert Hanschell (1879 to 1884). Quin bought the newspaper in 1884, and under his ownership the newspaper improved its reporting on events outside of the Virgin Islands.

After Quin's death in 1916 the newspaper's foreman, Gustave Johansen, took control of the newspaper, but the St. Croix Avis received condemnation under his ownership for policies that the public thought were detrimental to workers.

In 1940 Johansen sold the newspaper to Canute A. Brodhurst, Montclaire Creque and Ariel Melchior Sr.; Brodhurst ran the paper starting from 1942 and gave it a liberal political slant. When Brodhurst died in 1980 he was replaced by his daughter, Rena Brodhurst. In 1990, author John A. Lent noted that it was the oldest extant newspaper in the Caribbean.

In January 2024, Rena Brodhurst stated that the newspaper would shut down because it had been losing readership, and thus income, to social media and online news websites.

Several politicians of the Virgin Islands expressed their sadness at the closure. Angel Bolques Jr., a member of the Virgin Islands at-large legislature, said that the St. Croix Avis was “a beacon of accurate information, enlightenment, literacy, and community spirit”. Novelle Francis Jr., the Senate President, called the closure a “bitter pill to swallow”.

== Format ==
The St. Croix Avis was a bulletin board for the Virgin Islands government and regularly posted government notices. It reported on the weather and natural disasters of the Virgin Islands and commemorated the anniversaries of past disasters, including hurricanes. The St. Croix Avis, otherwise, sparsely covered domestic news, and most of its advertisements pitched goods imported from abroad.

The St. Croix Avis was published twice a week (every Tuesday and Friday). Most of its issues consisted of four to six pages, with three columns of text on each page.

Because of the large population of Danish speakers on the Virgin Islands much of the Avis was published in the Danish language. Public notices were printed twice, with an English version of a given notice adjacent a corresponding Danish version. After the United States purchased the Danish West Indies in 1917 and renamed the territory to the United States Virgin Islands, the St. Croix Avis stopped including Danish translations.

== Works cited ==
- Lent, John A. (1990). Mass communications in the Caribbean. Iowa State University Press. ISBN 978-0-8138-1182-6.
- Greene, Jerome A.; Cissell, William F. (1988). Historic Furnishings Report: Fort Christiansvaern, Christiansted National Historic Site, Christiansted, Virgin Islands. Harper's Ferry Center National Park Service, U.S. Department of the Interior.
