= Ezeilo =

Ezeilo is a surname. Notable people with the surname include:

- Angelou Ezeilo (born 1970), American social entrepreneur and environmental activist
- Cecilia Ezeilo, Nigerian politician, lawyer, philanthropist and television presenter
- James O. C. Ezeilo (1930–2013), Nigerian mathematician
