= Utahloy International School =

Utahloy International School may refer to:

- Utahloy International School Guangzhou
- Utahloy International School Zengcheng
