= GD Greenway =

Cycle route network in Guangdong, China

GD Greenway is a greenway in Guangdong, PRC, which consists of six trails.

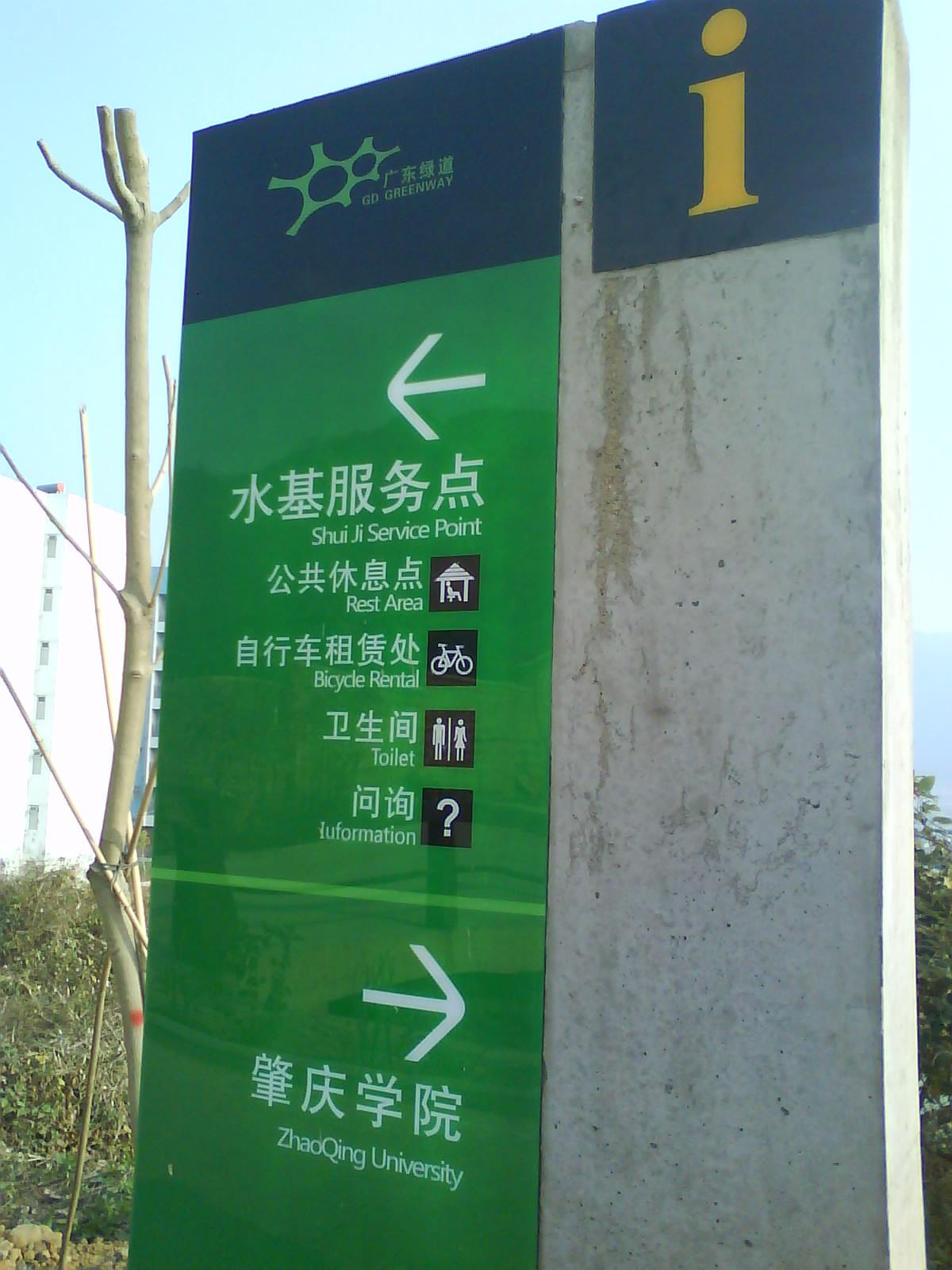
Line 1 Sign

== Trails ==
- Trail 1 is from Zhaoqing to Zhuhai via Foshan, Guangzhou and Zhongshan. It is 310km long.
- Trail 2 is from Guangzhou to Huizhou via Zengcheng, Dongguan and Shenzhen. It is 480 km long.
- Trail 3 is from Jiangmen to Huizhou via Zhongshan, Guangzhou and Dongguan. It is 370km long.
- Trail 4 is from Guangzhou to Zhuhai via Foshan and Zhongshan. It is 220km long.
- Trail 5 is from Huizhou to Shenzhen via Dongguan. It is 120km long.
- Trail 6 is from Zhaoqing to Jiangmen via Foshan. It is 190km long.
