= Angela Burt-Murray =

American author, journalist, and editor

Angela Burt-Murray is an American author, journalist, and editor. In March 2017, Burt-Murray was named Deputy Editor of Glamour. She was formerly editor-in-chief of Essence (2005–2010), executive editor of Teen People (2003–2005), and executive editor of Honey (2001–2003).

In 2005, Burt-Murray released The Vow, a novel co-authored with Denene Millner and Mitzi Miller. Their book was adapted for the Lifetime movie, With This Ring, which aired in 2015. Burt-Murray's 2014 novel, Games Divas Play was also adapted for the BET TV series, Games People Play. She is an executive producer for the show, which premiered in April 2019. In addition, she is the co-founder of Cocoa Media Group.

Burt-Murray is a graduate of Hampton University. She lives in Atlanta, Georgia, with her husband, Leonard, and two sons.
