= Nick Chiles =

American journalist

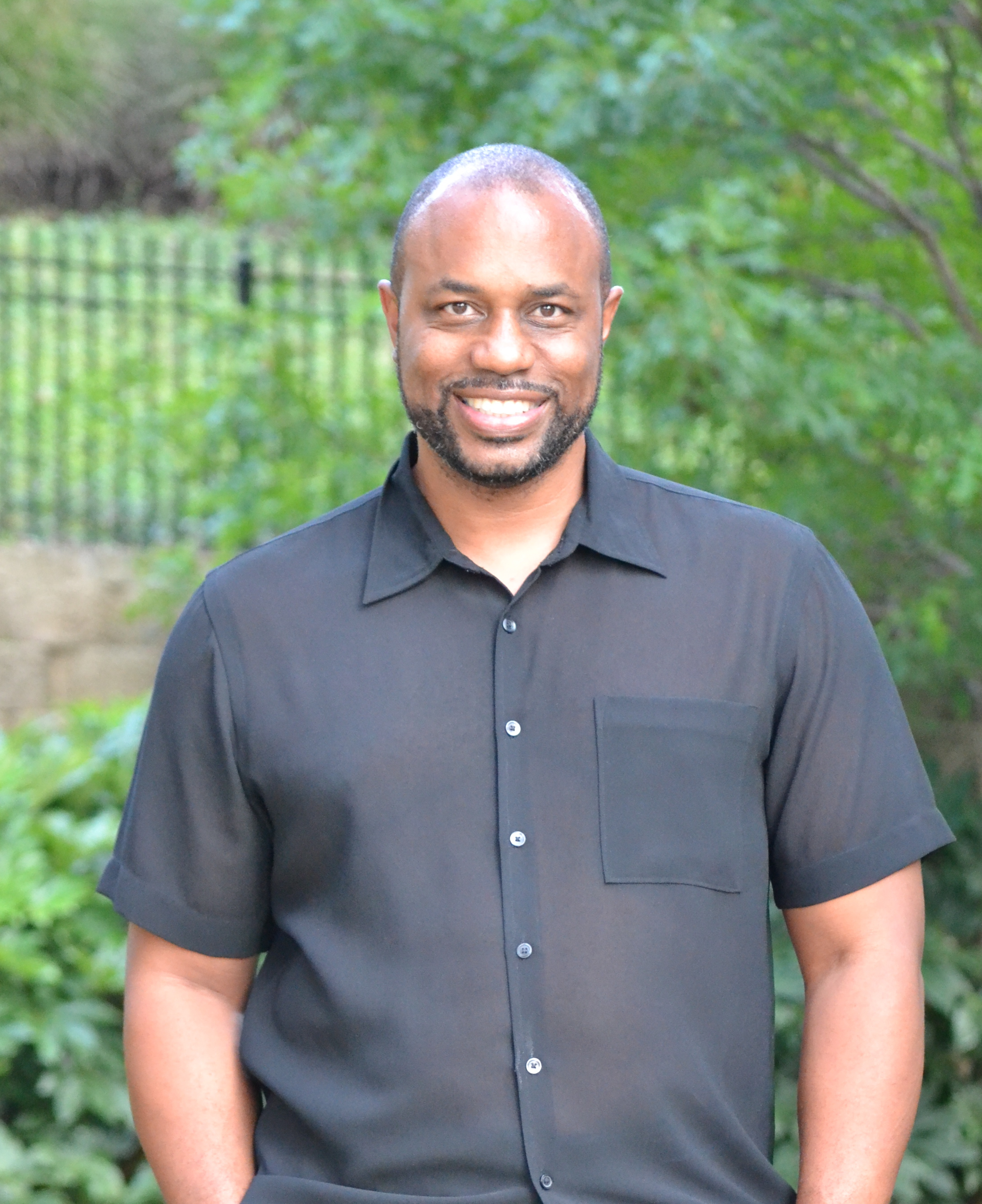
- Born: August 7, 1965 (age 61); New York City, U.S.
- Education: Yale University (BA), University of Georgia (MFA)
- Occupation: college professor/journalist/author
- Known for: Author of 24 books, five of which were NY Times bestsellers, Pulitzer Prize-winning journalist
- Spouses: Denene Millner (divorced): Sadiqa Chiles
- Relatives: Angelou Ezeilo (sister)
- Website: www.nickchiles.com

Nick Chiles (born August 7, 1965) is an American Pulitzer Prize-winning journalist and author of 24 books. He writes primarily about African-American life and culture.

== Early life ==
Chiles grew up in Jersey City, New Jersey, with his sisters Angelou Ezeilo (née Chiles) and Adrienne Wilhoite (née Chiles). His father is the late pianist Walter Chiles, who was the leader of the jazz trio Chiles & Pettiford in the 1960s and of the funk band LTG Exchange in the 1970s. Atlantic Records released the 1965 Chiles & Pettiford recording Live at Jilly's. Walter Chiles wrote most of the LTG Exchange's songs, including their biggest hit, "Waterbed".

Chiles attended St. Peter's Prep in Jersey City and received a B.A. in psychology from Yale University and a Master of Fine Arts (MFA) degree from University of Georgia.

== Career ==
Chiles worked as a reporter for The Dallas Morning News and New York Newsday, where he contributed to a 1992 Pulitzer Prize-winning story about a fatal subway crash. He later worked as an education reporter for the Star-Ledger. Chiles has also worked as a ghostwriter.

Chiles has worked as a literary agent with the Manhattan-based agency Aevitas Creative Management. He was a recipient of the Spencer Education Journalism Fellowship at Columbia University. Chiles was a member of the board overseeing the Atlanta Neighborhood Charter Schools; he is now a member of the board of the Spencer Education Journalism Fellowship. He is on the advisory board of the Hechinger Report, an independent newsroom covering inequity and innovation in education. He has served as a professor at Columbia Journalism School and at Princeton University as a recipient of the Ferris Fellowship. Chiles currently is a writer in residence and professor of journalism at the University of Georgia Grady College of Journalism and Mass Communication. He was formerly a communications consultant for the William Julius Wilson Institute at the Harlem Children's Zone.

== Books ==
Chiles has written or co-written 24 books, five of which were New York Times bestsellers. They are Disruptive Thinking: A Daring Strategy to Change How We Live, Lead, and Love (2023, co-authored with Bishop T.D. Jakes), The Blueprint: A Plan for Living Above Life’s Storms (2010, co-authored with Kirk Franklin), The Rejected Stone: Al Sharpton and the Path to American Leadership (2013, written with Rev. Al Sharpton), and Every Little Step: My Story, (2016, written with Bobby Brown.)

Chiles is the co-author of NFL quarterback/activist Colin Kaepernick's memoir, The Perilous Fight, which reached Number One on the New York Times bestsellers list a week after its September 2026 publication. He co-authored with Cheryl McKissack Daniel the story of her family's 200-year-old legacy of architects and builders called The Black Family Who Built America, published in 2025.

He teamed up with activist and former NBA star Mahmoud Abdul-Rauf to write his memoir, In the Blink of an Eye: An Autobiography, published in October 2022 by Colin Kaepernick's publishing company, Kaepernick Publishing.

He co-wrote four books that were published in 2021: a parenting memoir with Academy Award-winning actor (and Grammy-winning singer) Jamie Foxx, called Act Like You Got Some Sense: And Other Things My Daughters Taught Me; a spiritually empowering self-help guide with pastor to the stars Rev. Tim Storey, called The Miracle Mentality: How to Tap into the Source of Magical Transformation in Your Life; an inspiring tale of a young white boy, Cam Perron, and his life-long relationship with former Negro Leaguers, called Comeback Season: My Unlikely Story of Friendship with the Greatest Living Negro League Baseball Players (with foreword by Hank Aaron); and a powerful look at the plight of Black males in America, written with renown nonprofit leader Shawn Dove, called I Too Am America: On Loving and Leading Black Men and Boys.

Chiles and former NBA player Etan Thomas wrote Fatherhood: Rising to the Ultimate Challenge (2012). Chiles and then-Massachusetts governor Deval Patrick collaborated on the 2012 book, Faith in the Dream. His book Justice While Black, written with attorney Robbin Shipp, was a finalist for a 2014 NAACP Image Award. He co-wrote the 2019 book Engage Connect Protect: Empowering Diverse Youth as Environmental Leaders with Angelou Ezeilo (née Chiles), his younger sister.

Chiles and his then wife, American author Denene Millner, co-wrote the bestselling three book non-fiction relationship series, What Brothers Think, What Sistahs Know, published by HarperCollins. Their novel Love Don’t Live Here Anymore, published by Dutton, appeared on two bestseller lists, Essence and Blackboard. They also co-wrote the novels In Love And War and A Love Story.

A short story by Chiles was included in the Ballantine anthology, Brotherman: The Odyssey of Black Men in America, which won a 1996 American Book Award. Chiles and Jeff Jones also co-wrote a young adult novel called The Adventures of De-Ante Johnson: The Obsidian Knight.

Chiles lives in Athens, Georgia, with his wife Sadiqa Chiles.
