= Yayao =

Historic township in Zengcheng District, Guangzhou, China

Yayao Township (Zengcheng) Chinese: 雅瑶乡
- Township
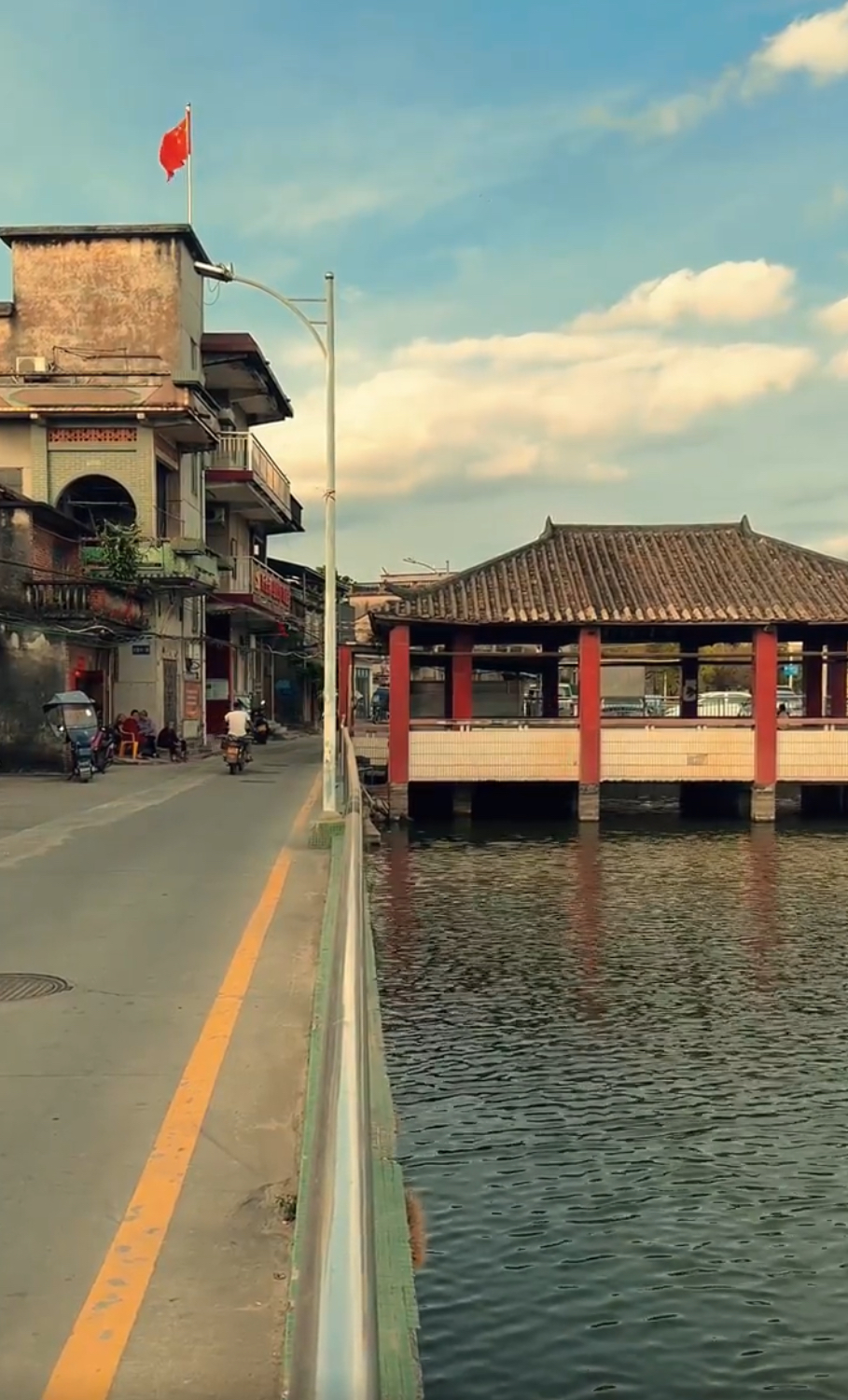
- View of Yayao Township (Zengcheng)
- Interactive map of Yayao Township (Zengcheng)
- Coordinates: 23°09′59.1″N 113°39′31.2″E
- Country: China
- Province: Guangdong
- Prefecture-level city: Guangzhou
- District: Zengcheng District
- Town: Xintang Town (新塘镇)
- Established: early Song dynasty

Yayao Township (Chinese: 雅瑶乡 pinyin: Yǎyáo; often romanized in Cantonese as Ngar Yiew and formerly known as Larn Gong (籣江)) is a township in Xintang Town (新塘镇), Zengcheng District, Guangzhou, Guangdong Province, China. During its history, it has been known and considered as a village and township (Chinese: 村, Chinese: 乡). The township lies along the Yayao River (雅瑶河), a tributary, diverging off the Dong River (东江), and is known for its strong history, traditional architecture, and strong community culture.

== Location ==
Yayao Township is located in southern Zengcheng District on the western bank of the Yayao River, bordered by Huangshatou (黄沙头), Gualing (瓜岭), Wushi (乌石), Dadun (大敦), and Jiuyu (久裕). Yayao Township lies approximately 3 kilometres (1.9 mi) northeast of central Xintang Town, across the Guangyuan Expressway, near Shixin Road (石新路) and Shapu Boulevard (沙埔大道). The main village entrance is a short bridge with decorative guardrails crossing a tributary of the Yayao River. Yayao Township—known locally as Ngar Yiew (雅瑶乡)—is a township of adjoining villages, including Hang Kau Village (巷口村), Chun Chin Village (村前村), Guan Dou Village (官道村), Sheung Ling Village (上领村), Cheung Hong Village (长巷村), and Lung Kau Village (龙口村).

The Yayao River—also called the Baishi River (白石河) or Gualing River (瓜岭河)—flows from Huafeng Mountain (华峰山) through Yongning, the Zengcheng Economic and Technological Development Zone, and Xintang before entering the Dong River.

== History ==
=== Early history ===
The Zengcheng County Gazetteer (《增城县志》 Qing Tongzhi edition) records Yayao Township as an established settlement along the East River basin. During the early Song dynasty, the scholar Gu Chengzhi (古成之)—the first imperial-exam laureate from Lingnan—studied at the “Xiangshan Doushi” (香山斗室) near present-day Yayao Township, giving one of the earliest references to the region.

=== Revolutionary period ===
In July 1938, under the guidance of the Guangdong Youth Anti-Japanese Vanguard (广东青年抗日先锋队), the Chinese Communist Party founded the “Yayao Branch” (中共雅瑶支部). A related body, the “Guangdong People’s Anti-Japanese Self-Defense Regiment – Zengcheng Yayao Battalion” (广东民众抗日自卫团增城雅瑶大队), was formed later that year with over 200 members. The former Yayao Branch Headquarters at 50 Yaoshi Street in Changxiang Village is preserved as a registered cultural relic.

== Geography and environment ==
The Yayao River basin supports rice paddies, lychee orchards, and fish ponds that have sustained the region for centuries. In the last 20 years, the Yayao River and other Dong River tributaries have been affected by pollutants—mainly caused by industrial and agricultural runoff. To restore water quality and improve flood protections, the district government launched the “Yayao River Comprehensive Remediation Project” and the “Yayao River Greenway Demonstration Section.” Completed in 2021, the 3 km greenway links historical villages via scenic walkways, restored wetlands, and cultural interpretation areas. Follow-up sewage management and eco-restoration projects were announced in 2024.

== Cultural heritage ==
=== Architectural heritage ===
Yayao Township retains traditional Lingnan architectural examples. The Wu Clan Main Ancestral Hall (吴氏大宗祠), dating to the Ming dynasty, features a three-hall, three-courtyard layout with brick carvings and swallow-tail rooflines. Other Qing-era ancestral halls and residences are listed as local-level cultural relics.

=== Traditions and festivals ===
The Yayao River hosts annual dragon-boat day (龙船日) celebrations on the first day of the fifth lunar month in over ten villages. The Gualing Dragon-Boat Scene (瓜岭龙船景) was inscribed in 2022 as an intangible cultural heritage item of Zengcheng District.

== Modern development ==
Xintang Town spans 85.09 square kilometres (32.85 sq mi), with 33 village committees and 20 residential communities. As of 2025, its population exceeded 560,000, ranking among China’s top 100 towns for industrial output. Xintang is nicknamed China’s “Denim Capital” (中国牛仔服装名镇), hosting a full apparel production chain. Local plans integrate industry with environmental restoration and heritage tourism.

== Culture and tourism ==
Yayao Township features in rural revitalization and heritage-tourism initiatives. The Yayao River Greenway forms a continuous cultural corridor linking architecture, eco-farms, and leisure spaces. “One River, One Heritage Belt” (一河一带) promotes heritage tours, lychee festivals, and dragon-boat exhibitions. Infrastructure improvements and ancestral-hall preservation position Yayao Township as a model “Beautiful Countryside” demonstration.
