= Jean Elizabeth Geiger Wright =

American conservationist, educator and animal activist

- Born: Jean Elizabeth Geiger; 1924; Atlanta, Georgia; United States
- Died: March 4, 2002 (aged 77–78); Cobb County, Georgia, United States
- Education: Washington Seminary (1942)
- Occupations: Conservationist, educator, animal activist
- Known for: Jean and Elwood Wright Environmental Education Center

Jean Elizabeth Geiger Wright (1924 – March 4, 2002) was an American conservationist, educator, and animal activist. After beginning with her family's own house and 19-acre (7.7 ha) farm property in Cobb County, Wright worked to restore multiple plots of land in Pickens and Union Counties. Her former property was purchased by Cobb County in 2003 for $650,000, far below market price, and today operates as the environmental education conservation, the Jean and Elwood Wright Environmental Education Center.

== Early years ==
Jean Elizabeth Geiger was born in Atlanta, Georgia in 1924 to Mr. and Mrs. Lester Henry Geiger. She graduated from Washington Seminary in 1942 and worked for a time at the First National Bank.

== Conservationism ==
In addition to restoring her own property in Cobb County, Wright worked with the Georgia Department of Natural Resources on its Weekend for Wildlife (WFW) project, which included annual fundraisers on Sea Island; the Environmental Resources Network (TERN); the Mountain Conservation Trust of Georgia (MCGTA); the Georgia Native Plant Society (GNPS); the Nature Conservancy; and the Southeast Land Preservation Trust, where she served as a director.

After the Wrights' deaths and the county took over ownership of their property, their house was converted to classroom space. The Wright Center was officially declared a wildlife sanctuary by the Atlanta Audubon Society in early 2019 and features nearly two miles of trails.

== Animal advocacy ==
Wright was a central figure in working to pass two bond referendums, in 1978 and 1992, to expand existing animal shelter facilities. She also worked with the Humane Society to bolster adoption rates, co-established the Homeless Pet Foundation, and lobbied the Georgia General Assembly to pass animal protection legislation. Wright became a member of the Cobb County Animal Control Board in 1987, and served as director of special projects for the Humane Society of Cobb County in the 1990s.

After her children grew up, Wright fostered dozens of dogs and puppies, to the extent she was known as the "Puppy Lady".

== Personal life ==
Jean Geiger married Ernest Elwood Wright on November 10, 1946; the couple had three children, daughters Kris and Kathy and son Robert ("Bob"). In the late 1940s the family purchased a house and land in Cobb County, which Wright worked for decades to restore to its natural state, seeking out native plants to install.

Wright died on March 4, 2002.

== Legacy ==
The Jean and Elwood Wright Environmental Education Center, commonly called the Wright Center, is named after Wright and her husband.

In 2020, Wright was added to the Georgia Women of Achievement Hall of Fame.
