= With This Ring (2015 film) =

2015 television film directed by Nzingha Stewart

- Film poster
- Directed by: Nzingha Stewart
- Starring: Regina Hall; Jill Scott; Eve
- Music by: Mateo Messina
- Country of origin: United States
- Original language: English

Production
- Cinematography: Anastas N. Michos
- Running time: 87 minutes
- Production company: Sony Pictures Television

Original release
- Network: Lifetime
- Release: January 24, 2015

With This Ring is an American romantic comedy drama television film that aired on Lifetime in 2015. Written and directed by Nzingha Stewart, it stars Regina Hall, Jill Scott and Eve. Stewart adapted the script from the 2006 novel The Vow by Denene Millner, Angela Burt-Murray and Mitzi Miller.

== Plot ==
Trista, a career-driven talent agent, has not gotten over her commitment-phobic ex; gossip columnist Viviane is still in love with the father of her son; and struggling actress Amaya will do anything to sabotage the marriage of her boyfriend. The three friends decide to make a vow to get married within a year after attending the wedding of their best friend.

== Cast ==
- Regina Hall as Trista Miller
- Jill Scott as Viviane Rhimes
- Eve as Amaya
- Brooklyn Sudano as Elise Johnson
- Stephen Bishop as Nate Adamson
- Jason George as Shawn
- Harold House Moore as Terrance Robb
- Deion Sanders as Keith
- Brian White as Damon
- John Lawrence Long as Cory
- Aswan Harris as Jeffery
- Kyle Carthens as William Branford Johnson
- Jason Rogel as Mikiko
- Gabrielle Union as Kitty

== Reception ==
With This Ring was one of the five most-viewed film on Lifetime that year. It was a cable ratings success particularly among women.

Stewart was nominated for two awards at the 47th NAACP Image Awards for With This Ring, Outstanding Directing in a Motion Picture (Television) and Outstanding Writing in a Motion Picture (Television).
