= Angelou Ezeilo =

American entrepreneur and activist

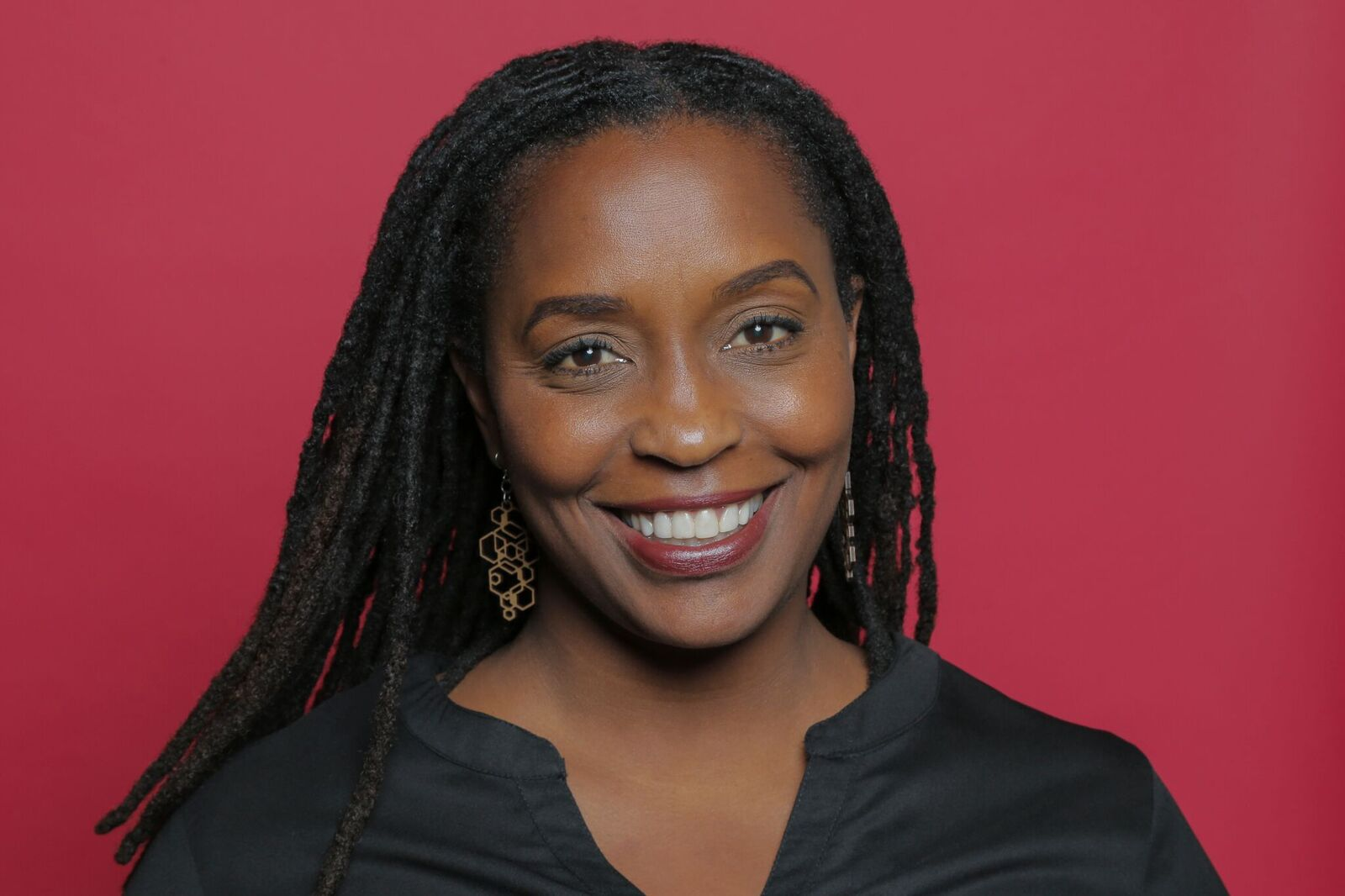
- Born: Jersey City, New Jersey
- Education: Spelman College; University of Florida College of Law
- Occupations: Entrepreneur; Activist
- Awards: Ashoka Fellowship

Angelou Ezeilo is an American social entrepreneur and environmental activist. She is the founder of Greening Youth Foundation, a nonprofit that connects underrepresented youth to the outdoors and conservation careers. She received an Ashoka Fellowship in 2016.

She is vice president of Empathy and Childhood Strategy for Ashoka Africa, working with her teams in West Africa, East Africa, Sahel, and Southern Africa. She co-wrote Engage, Connect, Protect: Empowering Diverse Youth as Environmental Leaders, released in November 2019 by New Society Publishers, with her brother, Nick Chiles.

== Early life and education ==
Ezeilo was born Angelou Chiles on December 11, 1970, in Jersey City, New Jersey to Helen Chiles, a nurse, and Walter Chiles, a pianist who performed in the musical groups Chiles & Pettiford and LTG Exchange. Her brother is journalist Nick Chiles.

In 1988, Ezeilo graduated from Mount St. Mary Academy in Watchung, New Jersey. She attended Hunter College in Manhattan, but transferred to Spelman College in Atlanta after her freshman year. Graduating from Spelman in 1992, Ezeilo went on to receive her J.D. from the University of Florida College of Law. While at the University of Florida, she met fellow law student James Ezeilo, whom she married in 1995.

== Career ==
Ezeilo began her legal career as a specialist for the New Jersey State Agriculture and Development Committee. She later was a project manager for the New Jersey and Georgia offices of the Trust for Public Land (TPL), where she supported land preservation initiatives, including projects in support of the Atlanta Beltline. Ezeilo's environmental focus led her to recognize the need for greater preservation-related education, and launched the Greening Youth Foundation in 2007. The Foundation serves young adults in the United States and West Africa to provide environmental education and conservation programming. In 2015, the Foundation received the USDA Forest Service Award for Diversity and Inclusiveness.

Ezeilo is also a diversity, equity, and inclusion consultant for corporations. She serves on the board of the National Center for Civil and Human Rights' Women in Solidarity Society, Arabia Mountain National Heritage Area, MillionMile Greenway, and the Atlanta Audubon Society.

In 2016, she received an Ashoka Fellowship for her work with the Greening Youth Foundation, and she would go on to take the role of Empathy Leader for Ashoka Africa.

== Personal life ==
Ezeilo lives in Atlanta, Georgia, and in Lagos, Nigeria, with her husband James. They have two children.
