= Me & Mama =

2020 picture book

- Author: Cozbi A. Cabrera
- Illustrator: Cozbi A. Cabrera
- Language: English
- Publisher: Simon & Schuster/Denene Miller Books
- Awards: Caldecott Honor
- ISBN: 9781534454217
- OCLC: 1455966172

Me & Mama is a 2020 picture book written and illustrated by Cozbi A. Cabrera and published by Simon & Schuster under the Denene Millner Books imprint. The book celebrates the relationship between a mother and her daughter.

Me & Mama was well-received by critics, including a starred review from Publishers Weekly, who described the book as "quietly engaging". Kirkus Reviews referred to it as "a beautifully illustrated, slice-of-life ode of adoration for doting daughters and marvelous mamas". However, they pointed out that "much of the text is uneven in rhythm with no consistent movement to usher readers from page to page". They argued that "the greatest delight is in the images that vibrantly showcase their simple, loving connection" and highlighted how the "impressively detailed scenes [...] are rendered with visible daubs of acrylic paint", which are "complemented by alternating scenes of single objects". Kharissa Kenner, writing for Shelf Awareness, highlighted how "the author celebrates natural hair with vivid illustrations portraying texture and precise depictions of hair types and styles common among BIPOC". Booklist also reviewed Me & Mama.

Me & Mama won a 2021 Caldecott Honor and a Coretta Scott King Award Honor for illustration.
