= European Greenways Association =

In May 1997, the first European Conference on Soft Traffic and Railways Paths (held at Val-Dieu Abbey, Belgium) voted to set up the European Greenways Association (EGWA). This association was created by many local, regional and national associations active in the scope of sustainable transport, willing to share their knowledge and objectives at a European level.

A greenway is defined as a stand-alone route for non-motorised traffic, developed with the following objectives: to integrate facilities & increase environmental value and quality of life. Greenways encompass the following characteristics: suitability of width, slope & surface to allow secure, appropriate use for a wide range of users including mobility impaired people. The current President is Giulio Senes, who is a professor at the Università degli Studi di Milano. EGWA is a member of the European Cyclists' Federation, and through that the World Cycling Alliance.

== Objectives of the EGWA ==
- To contribute towards the preservation of infrastructures, such as disused railway corridors, towpaths and historic routes (Roman roads, pilgrim paths, droveways,...) in the public domain to develop, along them, non-motorised itineraries.
- To encourage the use of non-motorised transport, draw up inventories of potential routes and write technical reports.
- To promote and coordinate the exchange of expertise and information among different associations and national and local bodies which are currently developing these initiatives in Europe.
- To inform and advise local and national bodies on how to develop non-motorised itineraries.
- To collaborate with European bodies to support their policies in term of sustainable development, environment, regional balance and employment.

The EGWA is active at different levels: To provide information about all aspects of the creation of a greenway from the first discussion to the delivery of the finished greenway for all the actors of the deployment. This includes technical info, political & administrative info, ... many studies have been performed by the association and are freely available online.
