= Kengbei station =

Metro station in Guangzhou, China

Kengbei 坑贝
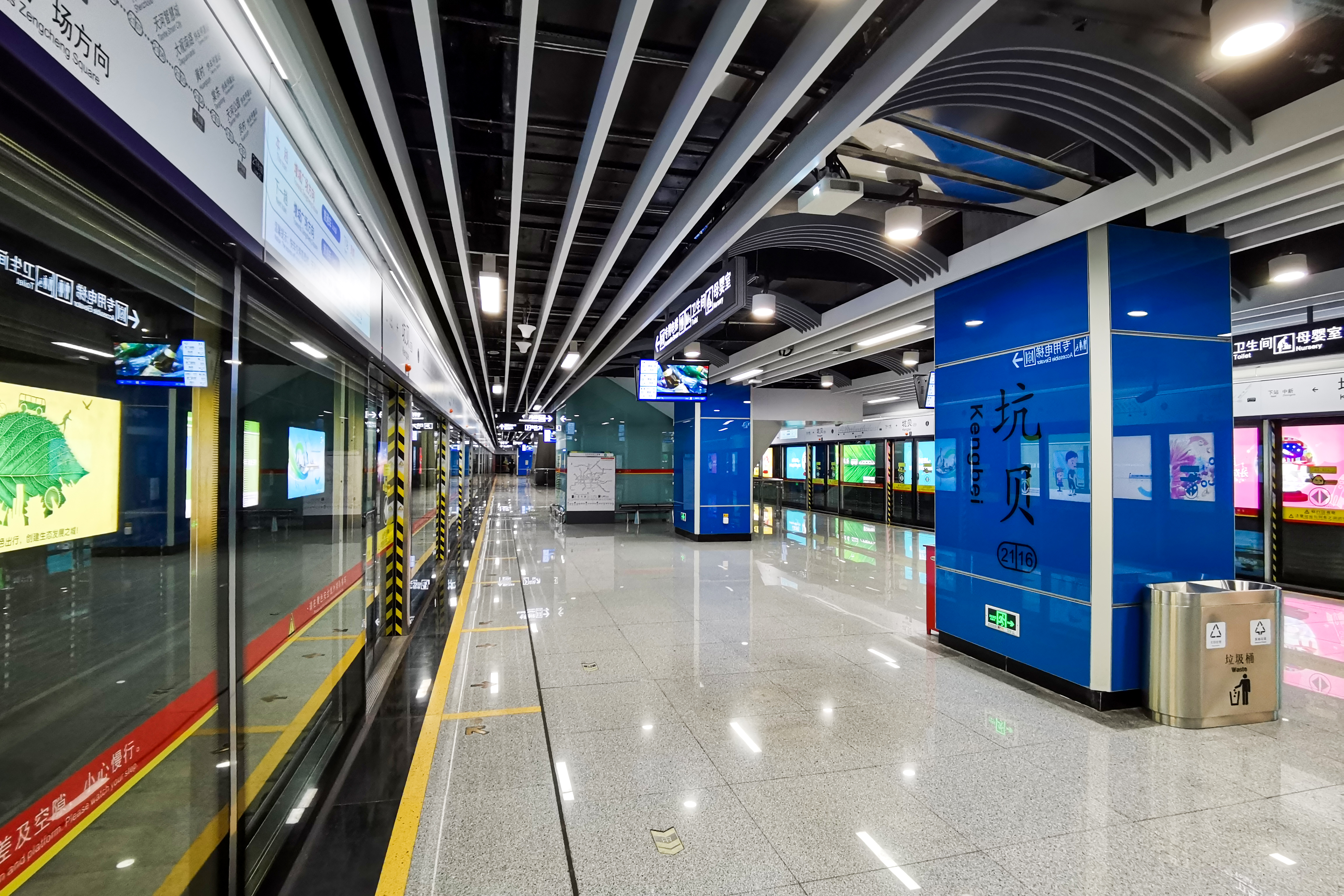
- Platform

Chinese name
- Simplified Chinese: 坑贝站
- Traditional Chinese: 坑貝站
Transcriptions

General information
- Location: Middle Zhucun Avenue (G324); Zengcheng District, Guangzhou, Guangdong; China
- Coordinates: 23°17′N 113°38′E
- Operated by: Guangzhou Metro Co. Ltd.
- Line: Line 21
- Platforms: 2 (1 island platform)
- Tracks: 2

Construction
- Structure type: Underground
- Accessible: Yes

Other information
- Station code: 2116

History
- Opened: 28 December 2018; 7 years ago

Services
Preceding station	Guangzhou Metro	Following station
Zhongxin towards Tianhe Park	Line 21	Fenggang towards Zengcheng Square
Location

Kengbei station (simplified Chinese: 坑贝站; traditional Chinese: 坑貝站) is a station of Line 21 of the Guangzhou Metro. It started operations on 28 December 2018.

== Exits ==
There are 3 exits, lettered A, B and C. Exit B is accessible. All exits are located on Fengguang East Road.

== Gallery ==
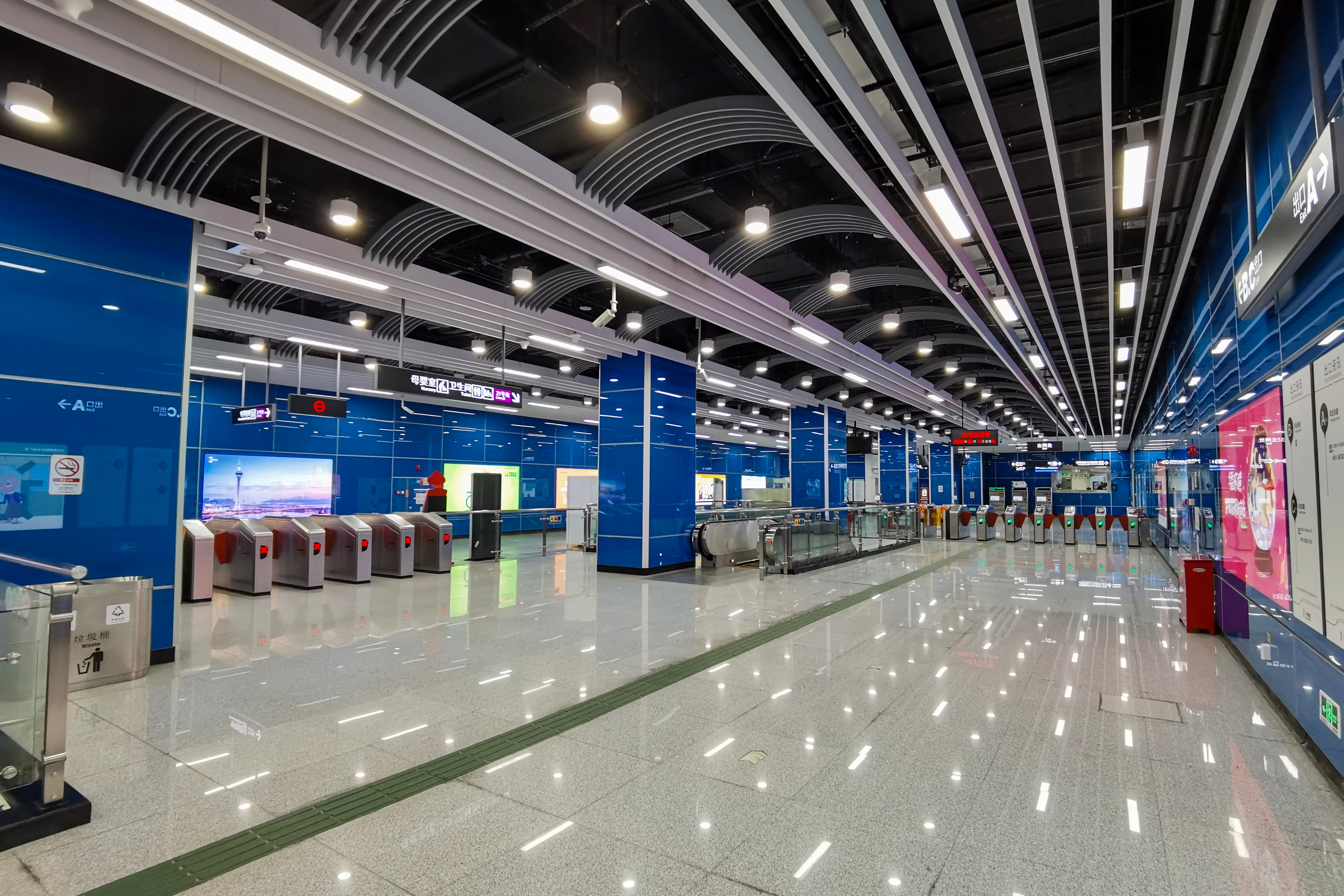
Concourse

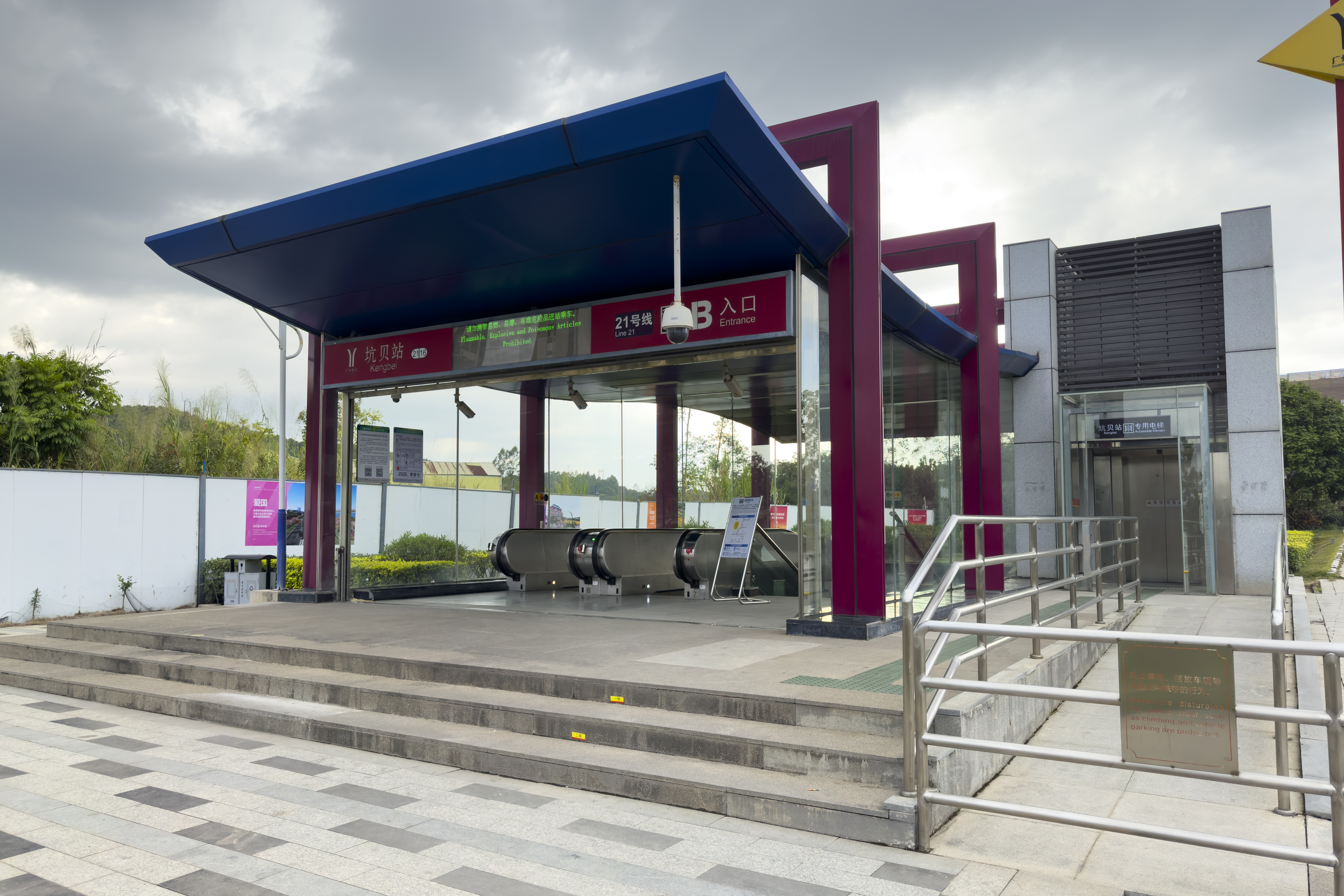
Exit B

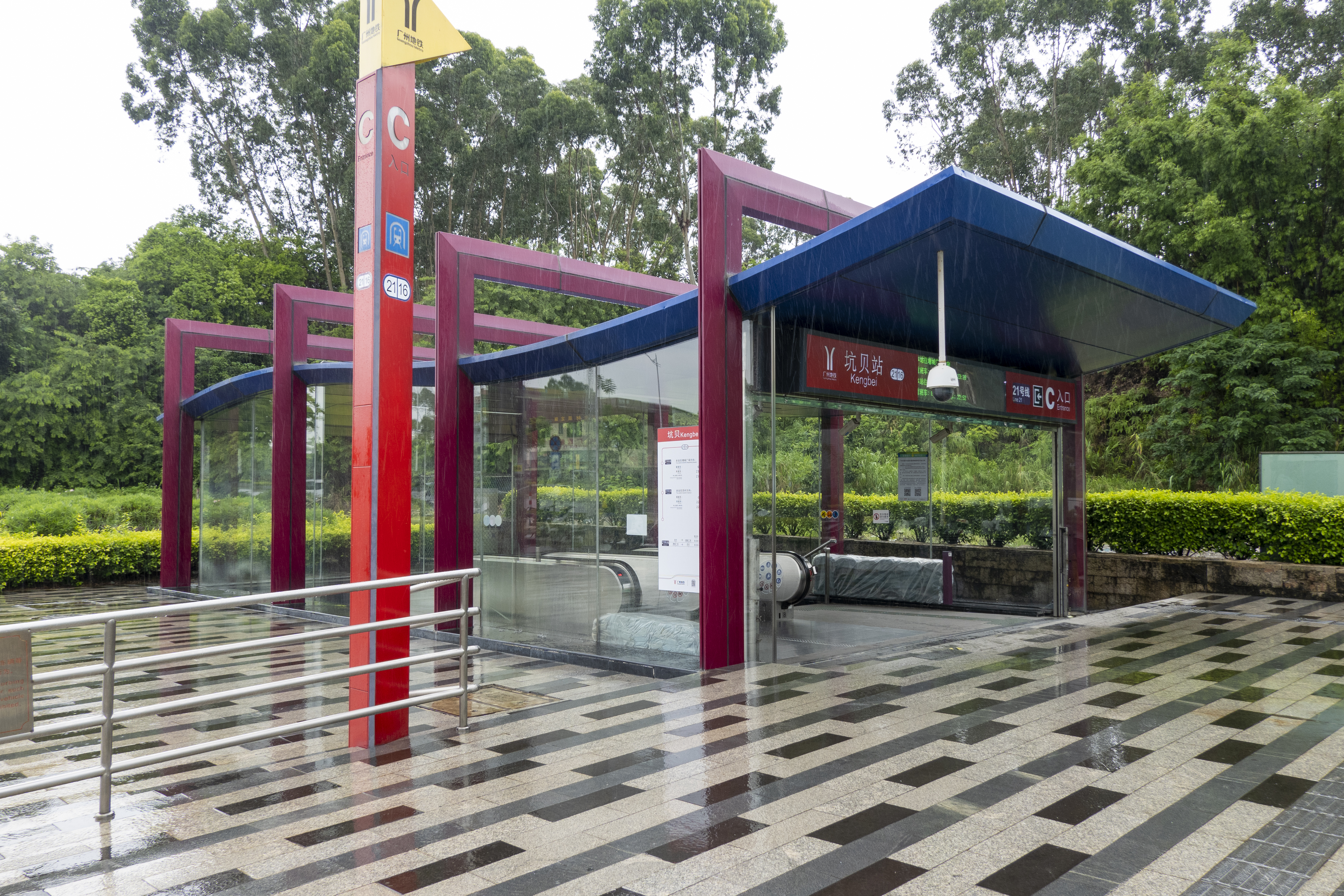
Exit C
