= Yongning Subdistrict, Guangzhou =

Yongning Subdistrict 永宁街道
- Subdistrict
- Location in Guangdong
- Coordinates: 23°10′44″N 113°35′28″E
- Country: People's Republic of China
- Province: Guangdong
- Prefecture-level city: Guangzhou
- District: Zengcheng District
- Time zone: UTC+8 (China Standard)

Yongning Subdistrict (simplified Chinese: 永宁街道; traditional Chinese: 永寧街道; pinyin: Yǒngníng Jiēdào) is a subdistrict in Zengcheng District, Guangzhou, Guangdong, China. As of 2018, it has 8 residential communities and 22 villages under its administration.

== See also ==
- List of township-level divisions of Guangdong
