= MillionMile Greenway =

The MillionMile Greenway (MMG) is an organization and system of connected greenways across metropolitan Atlanta, the state of Georgia and the eastern United States. MMG intends to help individuals and local communities begin or expand their efforts at conservation and recreation.

== Purpose ==
The MillionMile Greenway is a non-profit organization which acts as a mentor for people who want to preserve greenspace. Each section of the MillionMile Greenway aims to conserve greenspace, provide recreation for the public and connect to an existing greenspace. The MillionMile Greenway aims to achieve a balance between population growth and conservation of land and water resources for parks, trails and natural spaces.

== Affiliates ==
MillionMile Greenway affiliates are community organizations and organized citizens' groups. Current affiliates include:

Organization	State
Appalachian Trail Conservancy	
East Coast Greenway Alliance	
Coastal Georgia Greenway	Georgia
Friends of Mountains-to-Sea Trail	North Carolina
Georgia Pinhoti Trail Association	Georgia
Mountain Conservation Trust of Georgia	Georgia
Madison Greenway and Trails	Alabama
Northeast Georgia Regional Development Center	Georgia
Yahoola Creek Trails Conservancy	Georgia
