= Denene Millner =

American novelist (born 1968)

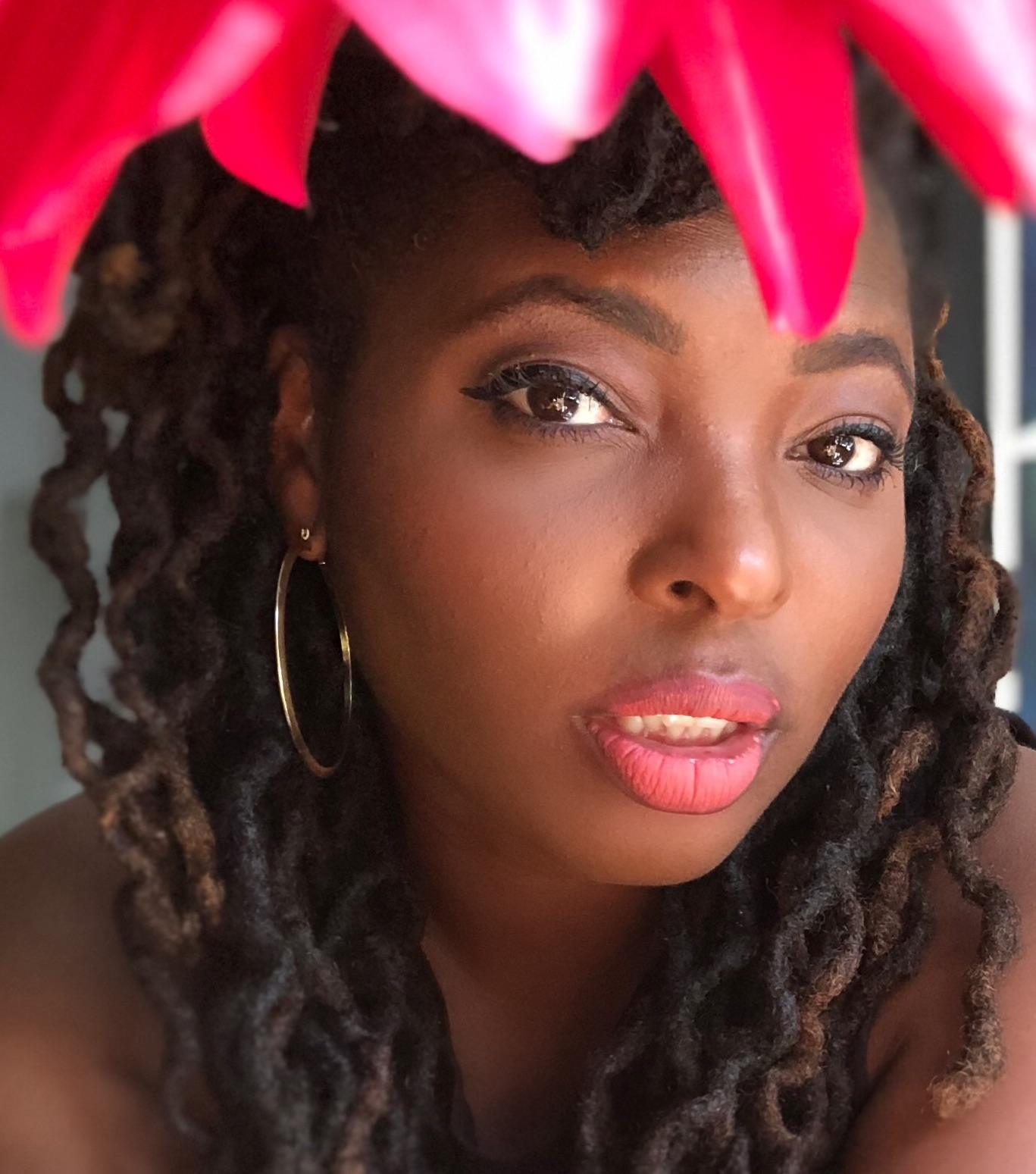
- Born: October 21, 1968 (age 57)
- Education: Hofstra University (BA)
- Occupations: Writer; editor; host

Denene Millner (born October 21, 1968) is an American author, editor, television and podcast host, and journalist. She has authored more than 30 books, including six New York Times best sellers. She is the creator and director of Denene Millner Books, an imprint of Simon & Schuster, and MyBrownBaby.com, a critically acclaimed blog that examines the intersection of parenting and race.

== Early life ==
Millner grew up in Bay Shore, New York and graduated with a B.A. in communications from Hofstra University.

== Career ==
Millner was a reporter for the Associated Press and a political and entertainment reporter for the New York Daily News. She served as Executive Editor at Honey and Articles Editor at Parenting, where she later worked as a columnist. In March 2011, Millner was chosen by Black Voices website as one of 40 Influential Black Female Writers. and in 2017 Forbes named her a top influencer in the parenting sector.

Millner has written and collaborated on over 30 books of fiction, non-fiction, and youth literature including co-authoring six New York Times best sellers: Act Like a Lady, Think Like A Man (in paperback and hardcover), Straight Talk, No Chaser (both with comedian Steve Harvey), I Am Charlie Wilson with R&B performer Charlie Wilson, Around the Way Girl with actress Taraji P. Henson, and Believing in Magic with Cookie Johnson.

Millner's other books include the young adult novel Miss You, Mina, written for Scholastic; the humor book, The Angry Black Woman's Guide To Life, and the novel The Vow, both written with Angela Burt-Murray and Mitzi Miller; and the three-book teen series Hotlanta written with Mitzi Miller. In 2015, The Vow was turned into a movie on the Lifetime network, called With This Ring, starring Jill Scott, Regina Hall, and Eve. Millner co-wrote three novels and three books of non-fiction with her former husband Nick Chiles, including Love Don't Live Here Anymore and What Brothers Think, What Sistahs Know, both Essence best sellers. In 2007, Millner wrote the novelization of the screenplay for Dreamgirls and in 2012, the novelization for Sparkle.

In 2019, Millner began hosting Speakeasy with Denene, a Georgia Public Broadcasting podcast that uses "art, culture, and entertainment to explore the beauty and humanity of blackness," and served as executive producer on the made-for-TV movie Angrily Ever After. Millner co-hosts the GPB television show A Seat at the Table, that focuses on issues affecting black women. Millner's multigenerational epic novel, One Blood, was published by St. Martin's Press in 2023.

=== Denene Millner Books ===
In 2016, Millner became an editor at Bolden Books with her own imprint, Denene Millner Books. Three years later, Millner moved the imprint to Simon & Schuster. The imprint publishes titles by African-American authors and illustrators, for readers of all ages. Millner describes her imprint as "a love letter to children of color who deserve to see their beauty and humanity in the most remarkable form of entertainment on the planet: books." In 2017, while still under Agate/Bolden, the imprint published the children's book Crown: An Ode to the Fresh Cut, which received a Newbery Honor, an Ezra Jack Keats Book Award, Caldecott Medal, two Coretta Scott King Awards, and the Kirkus Prize for Best Children's Literature. Following the move to Simon and Schuster, the imprint published a number of acclaimed books including Me & Mama by Cozbi A. Cabrera, recipient of a Caldecott Honor and Coretta Scott King Honor Book award and Just Like A Mama, nominated for an NAACP Image Award.

==== Selected Titles ====
- Crown: An Ode to the Fresh Cut by Derrick Barnes, illustrated by Gordon C. James (2017)
- Early Sunday Morning by Denene Millner, illustrated by Vanessa Brantley-Newton (2020)
- If Dominican Were a Color by Sili Recio, illustrated by Brianna McCarthy (2020)
- Just Like a Mama by Alice Faye Duncan, illustrated by Charnelle Pinkney Barlow (2020)
- Me & Mama by Cozbi A. Cabrera, illustrated by the author (2020)
- My Brown Baby: On the Joys and Challenges of Raising African American Children by Denene Millner (2020)
- My Rainy Day Rocket Ship by Markette Sheppard, illustrated by Charly Palmer (2020)
- There's a Dragon in My Closet by Dorothea Taylor, illustrated by Charly Palmer (2020)
- What Is Light? by Markette Sheppard, illustrated by Cathy Ann Johnson (2020)

== Personal life ==
Millner was formerly married to journalist Nick Chiles, with whom she has two children.

== Selected works ==
=== Fiction ===
- Love Don’t Live Here Anymore (with Nick Chiles) (2002)
- In Love and War (with Nick Chiles) (2003)
- A Love Story (with Nick Chiles) (2004)
- The Vow (with Angela Burt-Murray and Mitzi Miller) (2005)
- Dreamgirls a novel based on the screenplay by Bill Condon (2006)
- Sparkle a novel based on the screenplay by Mara Brock Akil (2012)
- One Blood (2023)

=== Non-fiction ===
- The Sistahs' Rules: Secrets for Meeting, Getting, and Keeping a Good Black Man (1997)
- What Brothers Think, What Sistahs Know: The Real Deal on Love and Relationships (with Nick Chiles) (1999)
- What Brothers Think, What Sistahs Know About Sex: The Real Deal on Passion, Loving, and Intimacy (with Nick Chiles) (2000)
- Money, Power, Respect: What Brothers Think, What Sistahs Know (with Nick Chiles) (2001)
- The Angry Black Woman’s Guide to Life (with Angela Burt-Murray and Mitzi Miller) (2004)
- Act Like a Lady, Think Like a Man: What Men Really Think About Love, Relationships, Intimacy, and Commitment (Steve Harvey with Denene Millner) (2009)
- Never Make the Same Mistake Twice: Lessons on Love and Life Learned the Hard Way (Nene Leakes with Denene Millner) (2009)
- Straight Talk, No Chaser: How to Find, Keep, and Understand a Man (Steve Harvey with Denene Millner) (2010)
- Little Satchmo (Sharon Preston-Folta with Denene Millner) (2012)
- I Am Charlie Wilson (Charlie Wilson with Denene Millner) (2015)
- Around the Way Girl: A Memoir (Taraji P. Henson with Denene Millner) (2016)
- Believing in Magic (Cookie Johnson with Denene Millner) (2016)
- My Brown Baby: On the Joys and Challenges of Raising African American Children (2017)
- Warrior Code: 11 Principles to Unleash the Badass Inside of You (Tee Marie Hanible with Denene Millner) (2019)

=== Young Adult & Children's Books ===
- Hotlanta (with Mitzi Miller) (2008)
- If Only You Knew: A Hotlanta Novel (with Mitzi Miller) (2008)
- What Goes Around: A Hotlanta Novel (with Mitzi Miller) (2009)
- Miss You, Mina (2010)
- My Brother Charlie (Holly Robinson Peete and Ryan Elizabeth Peete with Denene Millner) (2010)
- Early Sunday Morning (2017)
- Madam C.J. Walker Builds a Business (Rebel Girls Series) (2019)
- Fresh Princess (2019)
- Fresh Princess: Style Rules (2020)
