= Greenway (landscape) =

Shared-use path or linear park with vegetation

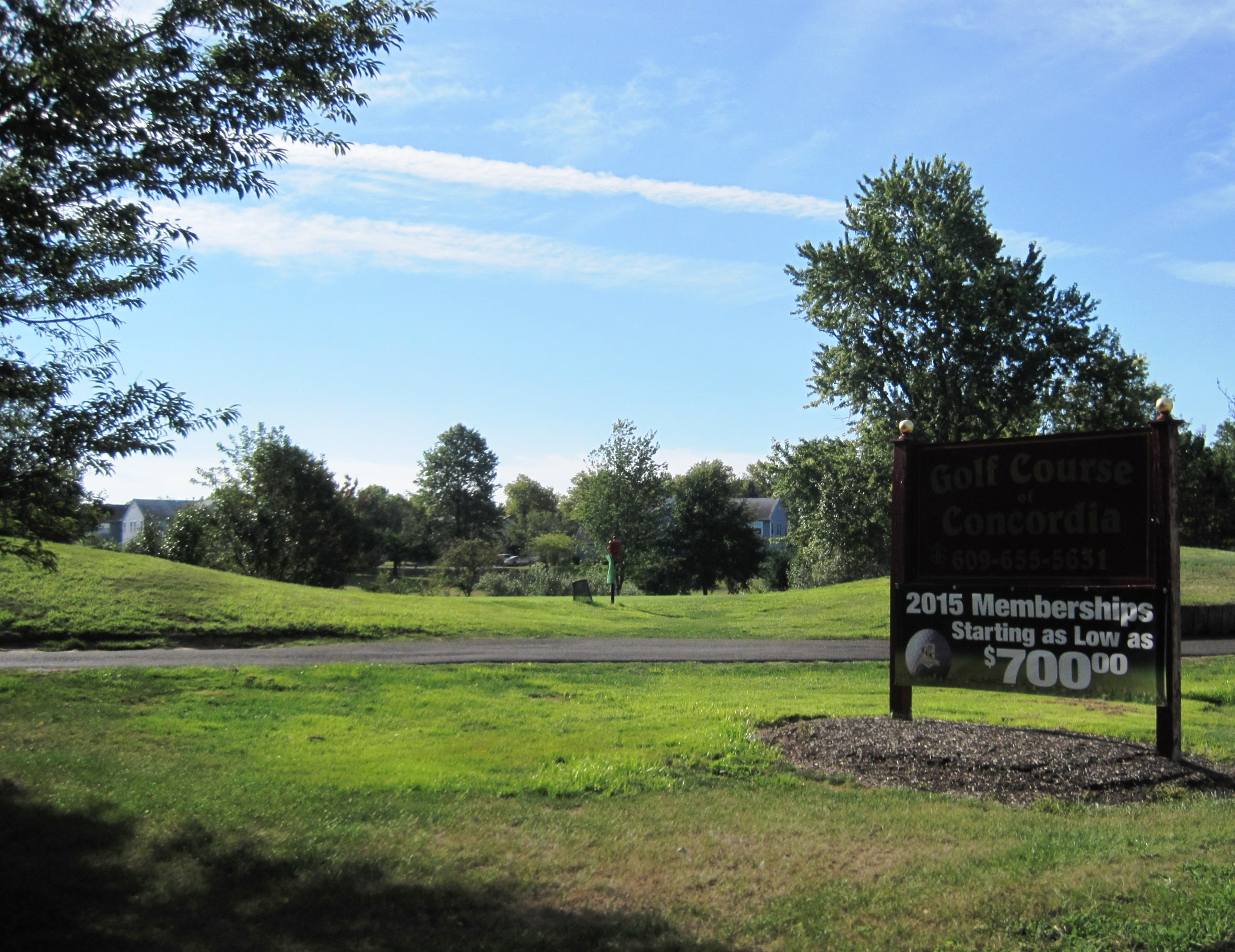
Golf course in the Concordia neighborhood, one of many age-restricted communities with greenways in Monroe Township, Middlesex County, New Jersey, U.S.

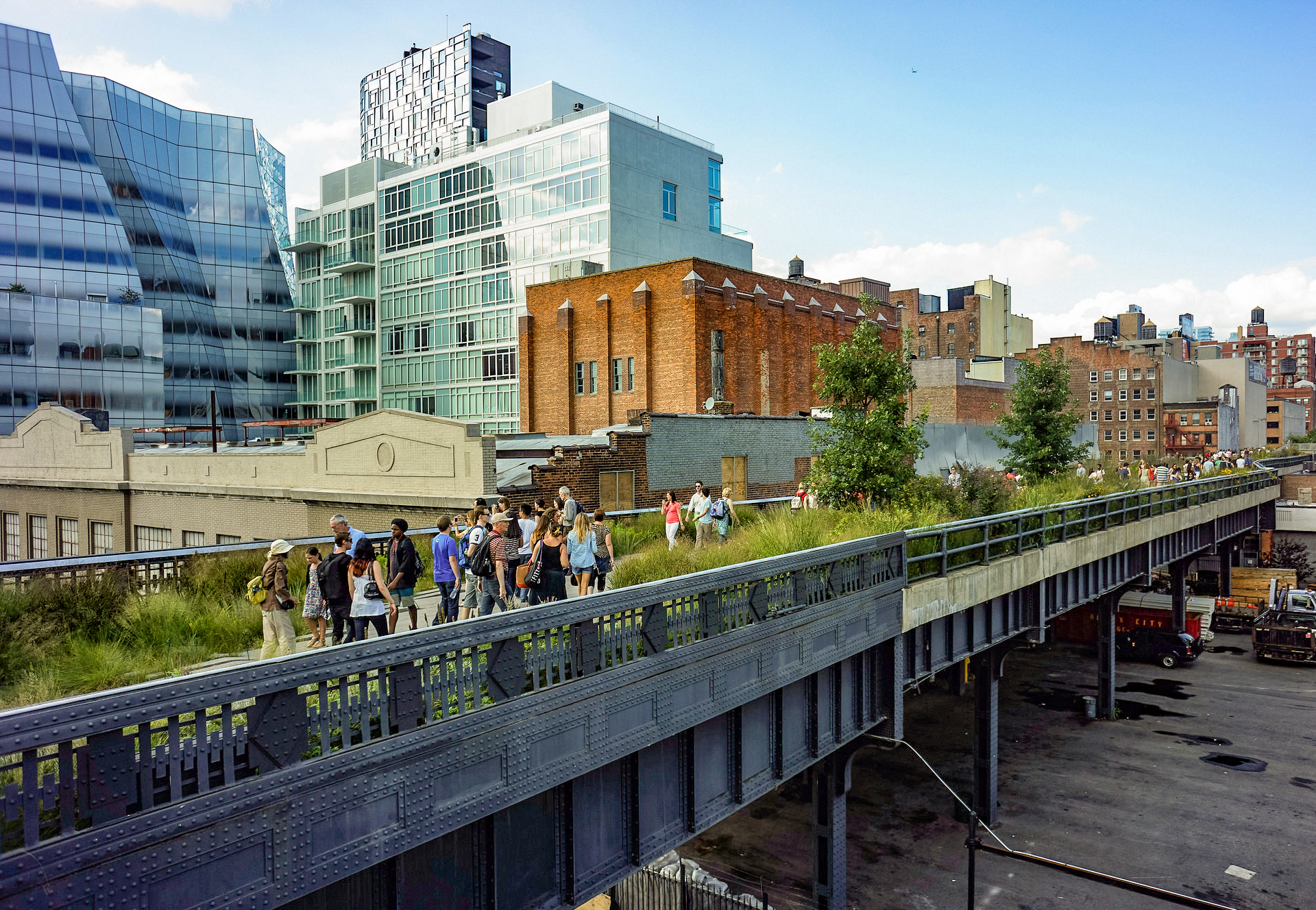
The High Line, a rail-to-trail elevated linear park, is an urban greenway in Manhattan.

A greenway is usually a shared-use path along a strip of undeveloped land, in an urban or rural area, set aside for recreational use or environmental protection. Greenways are frequently created out of disused railways, canal towpaths, utility company rights of way, or derelict industrial land. Greenways can also be linear parks, and can serve as wildlife corridors. The path's surface may be paved and often serves multiple users: walkers, runners, bicyclists, skaters and hikers. A characteristic of greenways, as defined by the European Greenways Association, is "ease of passage": that is that they have "either low or zero gradient", so that they can be used by all "types of users, including mobility impaired people".

In Southern England, the term also refers to ancient trackways or green lanes, especially those found on chalk downlands, like the Ridgeway.

== Definition ==
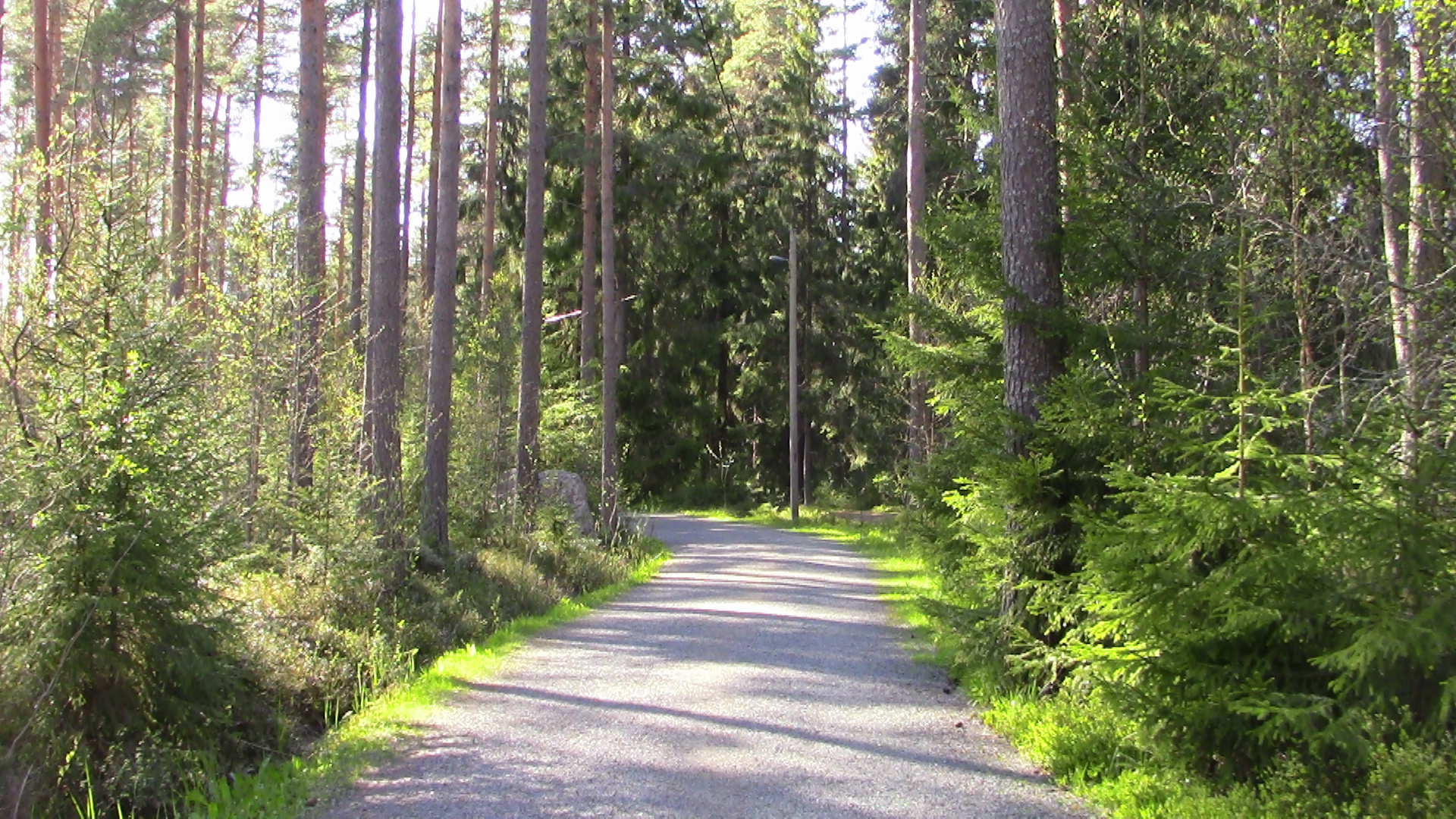
Jogging path in Pori, Finland.

Greenways are vegetated, linear, and multi-purpose. They incorporate a footpath and/or bikeway within a linear park. In urban design, they are a component of planning for bicycle commuting and walkability. The British organisation Sustrans, which is involved in creating cycleways and greenways, states that a traffic-free route "must be designed on the assumption that everyone will use it", and measures taken "to assist visually and mobility impaired users".

The American author Charles Little in his 1990 book, Greenways for America, defines a greenway as:

A linear open space established along either a natural corridor, such as a riverfront, stream valley or ridgeline, or overland along a railroad right-of-way converted to recreational use, a canal, scenic road or other route. It is a natural or landscaped course for pedestrian or bicycle passage; an open-space connector linking parks, nature reserves, cultural features, or historic sites with each other and with populated areas; locally certain strip or linear parks designated as parkway or greenbelt.

The term greenway comes from the green in green belt and the way in parkway, implying a recreational or pedestrian use rather than a typical street corridor, as well as an emphasis on introducing or maintaining vegetation, in a location where such vegetation is otherwise lacking. Some greenways include community gardens as well as typical park-style landscaping of trees and shrubs. They also tend to have a mostly contiguous pathway. Greenways resemble linear parks, but the latter are only found in urban and suburban environments.

The European Greenways Association defines it as

Communication routes reserved exclusively for non-motorized journeys, developed in an integrated manner which enhances both the environment and quality of life of the surrounding area. These routes should meet satisfactory standards of width, gradient and surface condition to ensure that they are both user-friendly and low-risk for users of all abilities.

— Lille Declaration, European Greenways Association, 12 September 2000

Though wildlife corridors are also greenways, because they have conservation as their primary purpose, they are not necessarily managed as parks for recreational use, and may not include facilities such as public trails.

== Characteristics ==
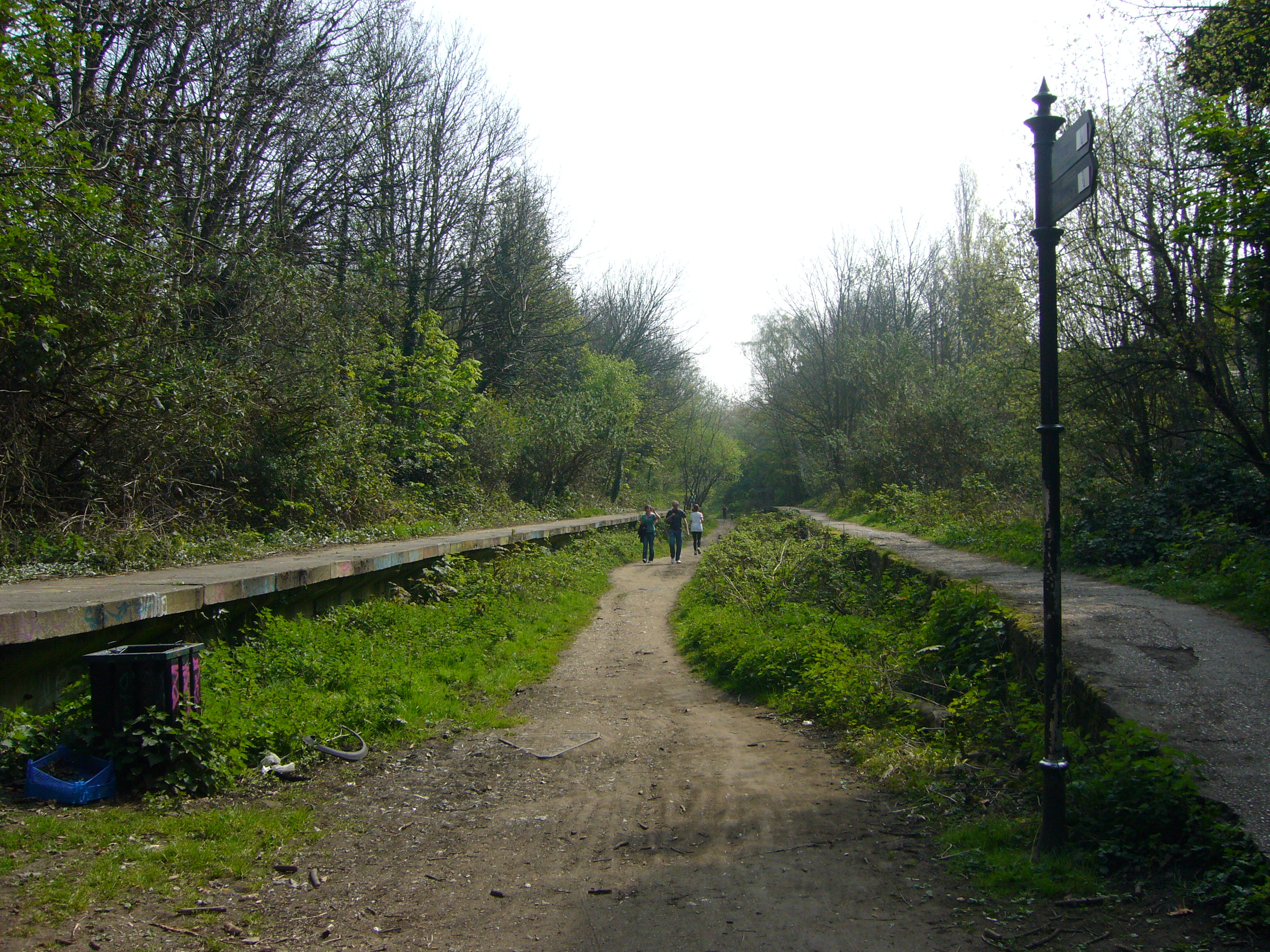
Railway Platforms on Parkland Walk in North London

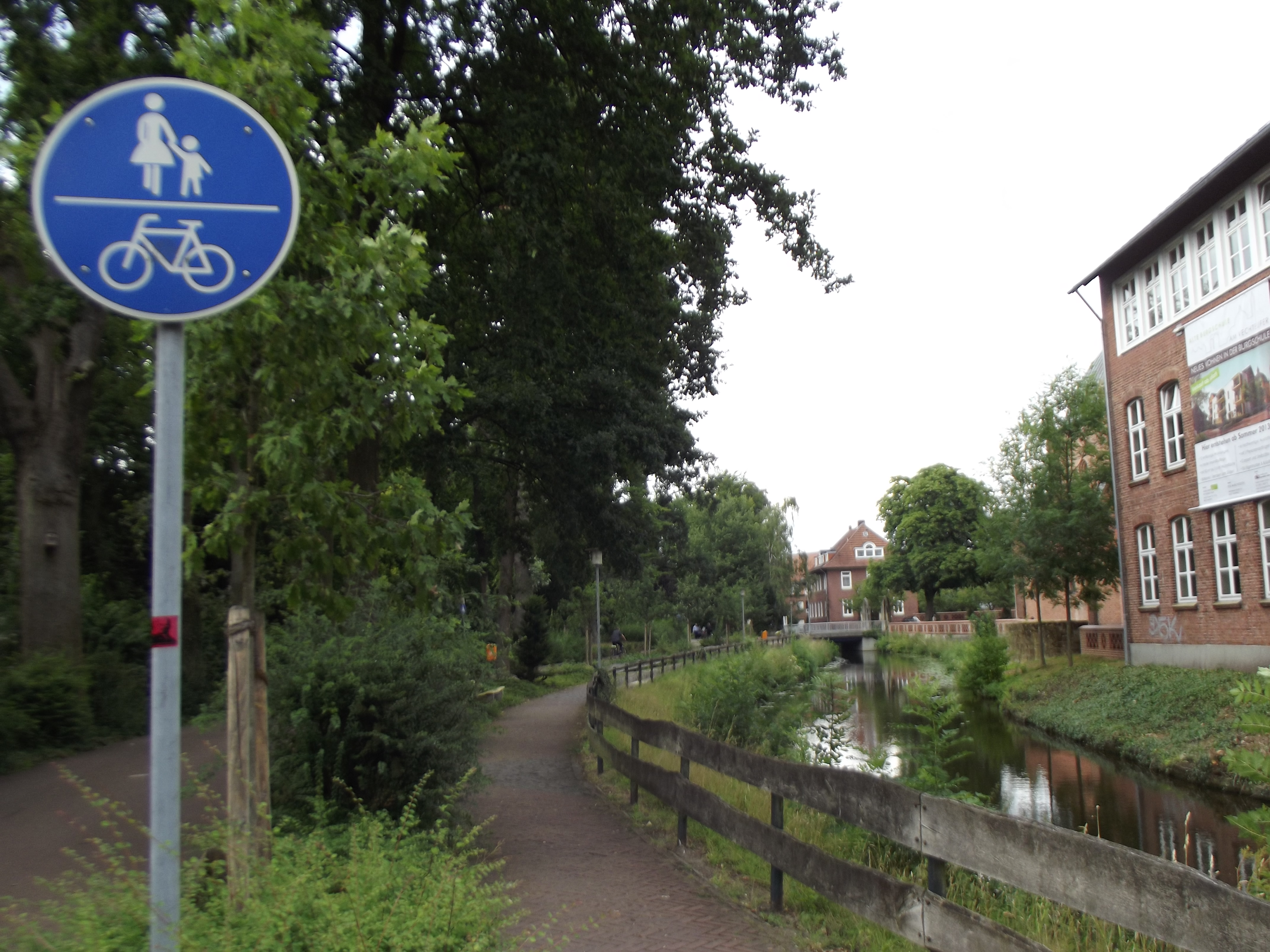
Signposted greenway, bordering on an urban canal in Nordhorn, Germany.

Charles Little in his 1990 book, Greenways for America, describes five general types of greenways:

- Urban riverside (or other water body) greenways, usually created as part of (or instead of) a redevelopment program along neglected, often run-down, city waterfronts.
- Recreational greenways, featuring paths and trails of various kinds, often relatively long distance, based on natural corridors as well as canals, abandoned rail beds, and public rights-of-way.
- Ecologically significant natural corridors, usually along rivers and streams and less often ridgelines, to provide for wildlife migration and species interchange, nature study and hiking.
- Scenic and Historic routes, usually along a road, highway or waterway, the most representative of them making an effort to provide pedestrian access along the route or at least places to alight from the car.
- Comprehensive greenway systems or networks, usually based on natural landforms such as valleys or ridges but sometimes simply an opportunistic assemblage of greenways and open spaces of various kinds to create an alternative municipal or regional green infrastructure.

Greenways are found in rural areas as well as urban. Corridors redeveloped as greenways often travel through both city and country, connecting them together. Even in rural areas, greenways provide residents access to open land managed as parks, as contrasted with land that is vegetated but inappropriate for public use, such as agricultural land. Where the historic rural road network has been enlarged and redesigned to favor high-speed automobile travel, greenways provide an alternative for people who are elderly, young, less mobile or seeking a reflective pace.

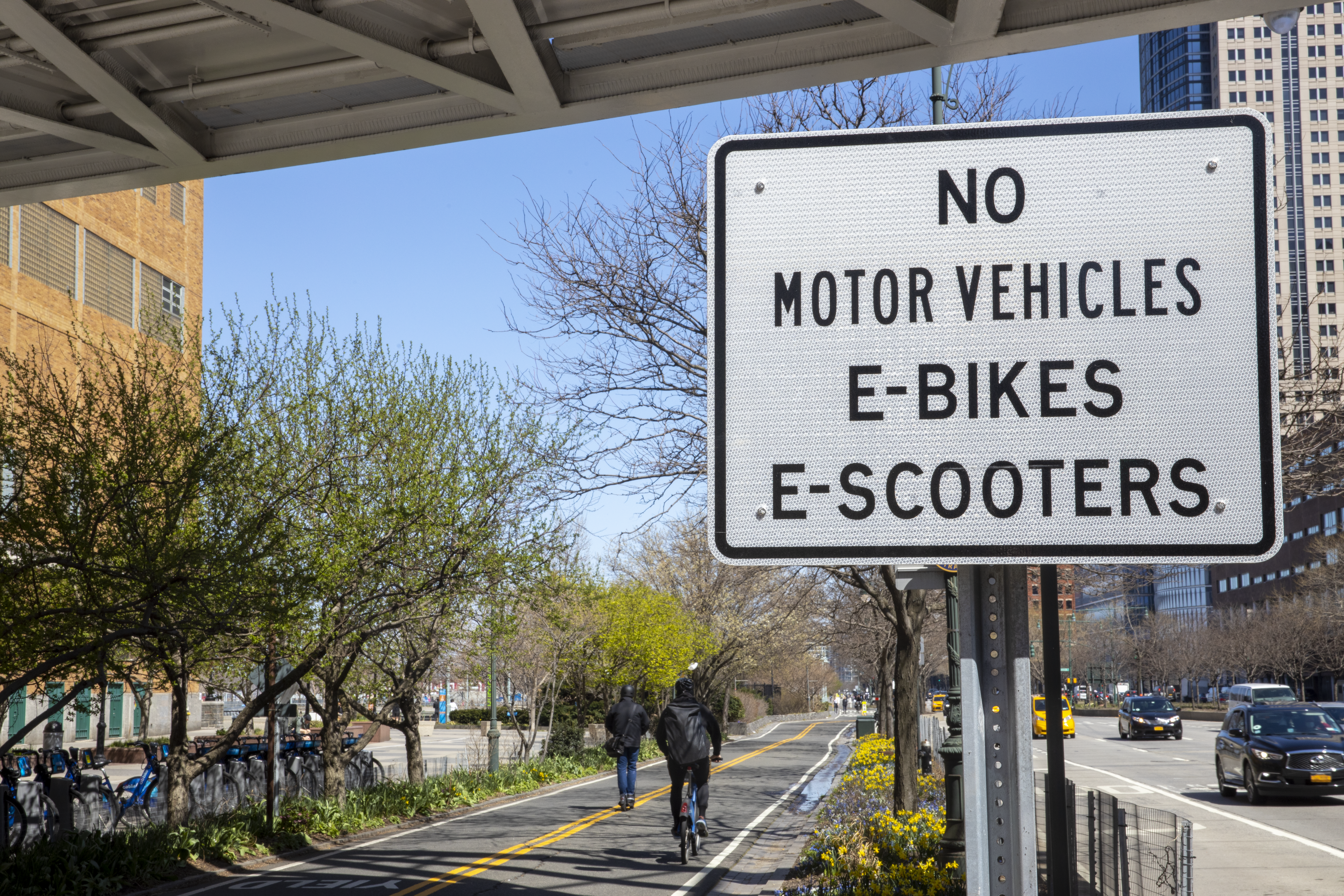
"NO MOTOR VEHICLES E-BIKES E-SCOOTERS" sign posted on the Hudson River Greenway in New York City.

Tom Turner analyzed greenways in London looking for common patterns among successful examples. He was inspired by the pattern language technique of architect Christopher Alexander. A pattern language is an organized and coherent set of "patterns", each of which describes a problem and the core of a solution that can be used in many ways within a specific field of expertise. Turner concluded there are seven types, or 'patterns', of greenway which he named:

- parkway: a landscaped thoroughfare. The term is particularly used for a roadway in a park or connecting to a park from which trucks and other heavy vehicles are excluded.
- blueway: a water trail
- paveway: an upgraded pavement or sidewalk: "Well-designed paveways, with appropriate planting and street furniture, should be formed along main pedestrian desire lines".
- glazeway: a glazed passage linking buildings. Turner argues for their greater use in cities.
- skyway, skybridge, or skywalk is an elevated type of pedway connecting two or more buildings in an urban area, or connecting elevated points within mountainous recreational zones.
- ecoway: linked green spaces or green corridor, including household gardens in a city.
- cycleway.

== Foreshoreway ==
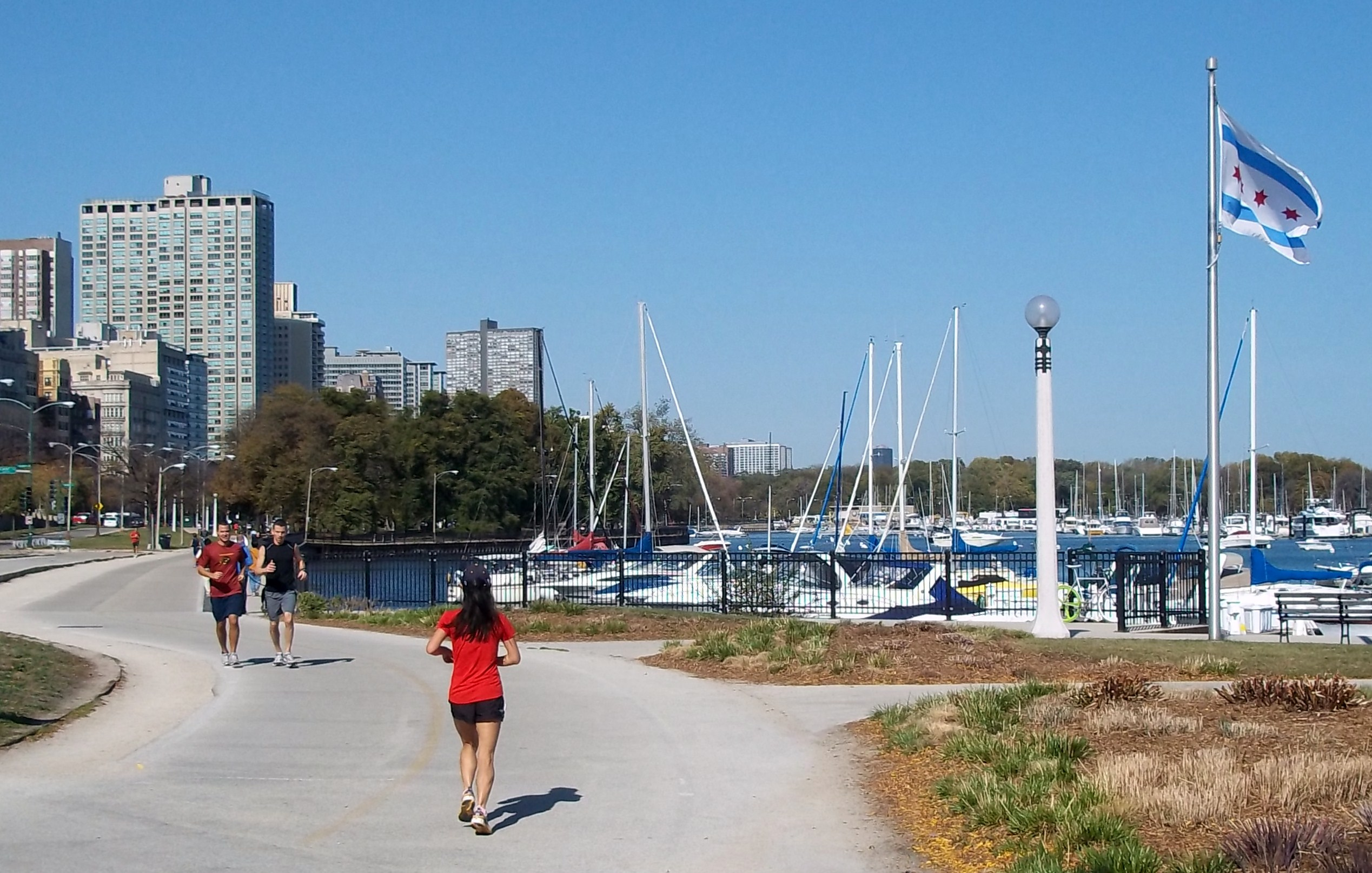
Chicago Lakefront Trail

In Australia, a foreshoreway (or oceanway) is a greenway that provides a public right-of-way along the edge of the sea, open to both walkers and cyclists. Foreshoreways resemble promenades and boardwalks.

Foreshoreways are usually concerned with the idea of sustainable transport. A foreshoreway is accessible to both pedestrians and cyclists and gives them the opportunity to move unimpeded along the seashore. Dead end paths that offer public access only to the ocean are not part of a foreshoreway.

A foreshoreway corridor often includes a number of traffic routes that provide access along an oceanfront, including:

- walking along the beach
- edge of foreshore off-road greenway
- edge of road off-road greenway
- on road bikeway
- on road private vehicles routes
- on road public transport corridor

A major example is The Gold Coast Oceanway along beaches in Gold Coast, Queensland, a shared use pedestrian and cyclist pathway on the Gold Coast, connecting the Point Danger lighthouse on the New South Wales and Queensland border to the Gold Coast Seaway. The network includes 36 kilometres (22 mi) of poor, medium and high quality pathways. Others include: The Chicago Lakefront Trail, the Dubai Marina, the East River Greenway, New Plymouth Coastal Walkway, and the Manhattan Waterfront Greenway.

Public rights of way frequently exist on the foreshore of beaches throughout the world. In legal discussions the foreshore is often referred to as the wet-sand area (see Right of way (transit)#Foreshore for a fuller discussion).

== Linear park ==
A linear park is a park in an urban or suburban setting that is substantially longer than it is wide. (Note: There is no dictionary definition for the term in the full Oxford Dictionary of English. Linear: Resembling a line; very narrow in proportion to its length, and of uniform breadth. Oxford Dictionary of English. The term linear park seems to be first used on a regular basis in the 1960s and 1970s (Google Ngram Viewer). The earliest usage in Britain is, in reference to the idea of a River Thames "linear national park", in Time on the Thames by Eric Samuel De Maré (Architectural Press, 1952) (Ngram). Google Ngram Viewer, however, indicates a few earlier examples, including the US in 1939 (Supplementary report of the Urbanism Committee to the National Resources Committee, Volume 2. United States. National Resources Committee. Research Committee on Urbanism, Clarence Addison Dykstra. U.S. Govt. 1939.) It may also have been used in 1873, but Ngram didn't provide the source(s).) Some are rail trails ("rails to trails"), that are disused railroad beds converted to recreational use, while others use strips of public land next to canals, streams, extended defensive walls, electrical lines, highways and shorelines. They are also often described as greenways. In Australia, a linear park along the coast is known as a foreshoreway.

== Examples ==
=== Australia ===
- Gold Coast Oceanway
- Cooks River to Iron Cove Greenway

=== Canada ===
- Carrall Street Greenway, currently under development in Vancouver
- Central Valley Greenway, a 24-kilometre pedestrian and cyclist route through Metro Vancouver, running from Vancouver to New Westminster.
- Chrysler Canada Greenway is a 42 km-long rail trail in Essex County, Ontario
- Grand Concourse (St. John's), 200 kilometers (120 mi) of walkways linking every major park, river, pond, and green space in the Northeast Avalon region of Newfoundland.
- Trans Canada Trail; Newfoundland T'Railway
- Vancouver Greenway Network, a list of Vancouver City Greenways
- Welland Canal Parkway Trail, St Catharines and Port Colborne, Ontario

=== China ===
- Guangdong Greenway, Guangdong province, China including much of Guangzhou city including the Guangzhou Higher Education Mega Center in Panyu District provides foot and bicycle paths along the Pearl River and other scenic areas.

=== Europe ===
- EuroVelo cycle routes and the European Greenways Association routes throughout Europe.
- Vía Verde del Pas, between El Astillero and Puente Viesgo in Spain
- RAVeL network is an autonomous network of slow ways in Belgium. It is a network of itineraries reserved for pedestrians, cyclists, horse riders and people with reduced mobility.
- Irish greenways are cycle and walking paths, often constructed on defunct rail lines.

=== New Zealand ===
- Otago Central Rail Trail

=== United Kingdom ===
- Ayot Greenway, Alban Way, and Cole Green Way Hertfordshire
- The Greenway, foot and cycle path in East London, England
- The Ridgeway, foot and cycle path in South London, England
- Parkland Walk, a reclaimed railway line in North London

=== United States ===
- Anne Springs Close Greenway, a 2,100-acre greenway and recreation complex in Fort Mill, South Carolina
- Boise River Greenbelt, a 20-mile-long (32 km) trail system in Boise, Idaho
- Brays Bayou, a bayou in Houston
- Capital Area Greenbelt, a 20-mile greenway connecting neighborhoods, parks and open spaces in Harrisburg, Pennsylvania
- Capital Area Greenway, one of the nation's oldest community greenway systems in Raleigh, North Carolina
- Cardinal Greenway, Indiana's longest span of recreational trails.
- Cherry Creek Greenway in Denver
- Chicago Lakefront Trail, an 18-mile (29 km) walking, cycling, and running trail along the coast of Lake Michigan in Chicago
- Bloomingdale Trail, a 2.7-mile (4.3 km) elevated linear park running east–west on the northwest side of Chicago
- Dequindre Cut, a greenway connecting to the International Riverfront in Detroit
- East Coast Greenway, a trail being constructed along the Atlantic coast
- The Emerald Necklace, a series of interconnected parks in Boston, Massachusetts, designed by Frederick Law Olmsted
- Grand Rounds Scenic Byway, a linked series of parks making a roughly circular path through Minneapolis
- Greater Grand Forks Greenway, large public park on the banks of the Red River and Red Lake River in Grand Forks, North Dakota, and East Grand Forks, Minnesota
- High Line, New York City
- Lafitte Greenway in New Orleans
- Leon Creek Greenway, San Antonio, Texas, linking the University of Texas at San Antonio by foot and bicycle path to Leon Valley and beyond.
- Little Sugar Creek Greenway, 20-mile long greenway in Mecklenburg County, North Carolina
- The Loop, a network of seven linear parks encircling Tucson, Arizona, with over 100 miles of paved trails
- Manhattan Waterfront Greenway, a circumferential foot and cycle path around Manhattan Island.
- Maryville Alcoa Greenway, an eight mile long foot and cycle path extending from Maryville Intermediate School in Maryville, Tennessee, to the end of Springbrook Park in Alcoa, Tennessee
- Midtown Greenway, five-and-a-half mile pedestrian and bicycle path through Minneapolis
- MillionMile Greenway, an organization and a system of connected greenways across metro Atlanta, the state of Georgia and the eastern United States
- Min Hi Line, linear park and trail that is repurposing a freight rail and agricultural-industrial corridor in Minneapolis
- Monadnock-Sunapee Greenway, 50-mile mountainous trail in southwestern New Hampshire (not a paved or shared-use path)
- Mountains to Sound Greenway, 150 million acres of land surrounding Interstate 90 from Seattle across the Cascade Mountains to Ellensburg, Washington
- Niagara River Greenway Plan, along the US Niagara Frontier
- Ohio & Erie Canalway, follows the path of the original Ohio and Erie Canal in Northeast Ohio. A portion is maintained by the United States National Park Service as a part of Cuyahoga Valley National Park.
- Ohlone Greenway, in the East Bay region of the San Francisco Bay Area
- Rahway River Parkway, along the Rahway River, Union County, New Jersey
- Rachel Carson Greenway, in Maryland
- The River Ring, a system of connected greenways encircling St. Louis, Missouri
- Rose Kennedy Greenway, a series of parks and open spaces in Boston

== See also ==
- Esplanade
- Green Bridge
- Landscape architecture
- Landscape planning
- Park system; Regional park; Urban park; Public park
- Rails with trails
- Trail
- Walking in London

== Sources ==
- Fabos, Julius Gy. and Ahern, Jack (Eds.) (1995) Greenways: The Beginning of an International Movement, Elsevier Press
- Flink, Charles A. & Searns, Robert M. (1993) Greenways A Guide to Planning, Design and Development Island Press
- Flink, Charles A., Searns, Robert M. & Olka, Kristine (2001) Trails for the Twenty-First Century Island Press. Washington, DC. ISBN 1559638192
- Hay, Keith G. (1994) "Greenways" The Conservation Fund. Arlington, VA.
- Little, Charles E. Greenways for America (1990) Johns Hopkins University Press
- Loh, Tracy Hadden et al. (2012) "Active Transportation Beyond Urban Centers: Walking and Bicycling in Small Towns and Rural America" Rails-to-Trails Conservancy. Washington, DC. (PDF retrieved 15 March 2012.)
- Natural England Greenways Handbook (PDF retrieved 15 March 2012.)
- Smith, Daniel S. & Hellmund, Paul Cawood. (1993) Ecology of Greenways: Design and Function of Linear Conservation Areas. University of Minnesota Press
- Turner, Tom (1995). "Greenways, blueways, skyways and other ways to a better London". Landscape and Urban Planning. 33 (1–3): 269–282. Bibcode:1995LUrbP..33..269T. doi:10.1016/0169-2046(94)02022-8.
