= Zhongxin station =

Metro station in Guangzhou, China

Zhongxin 中新
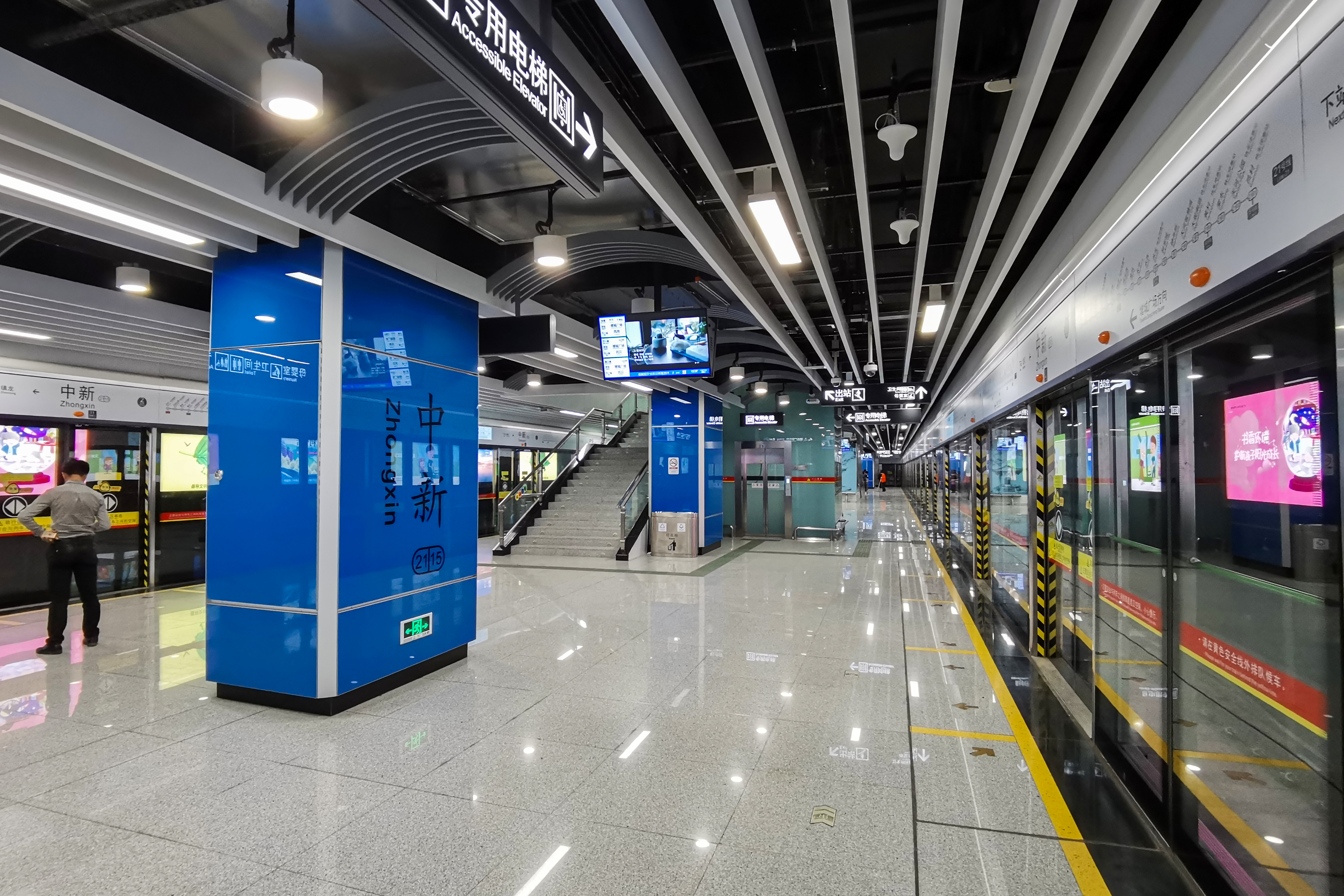
- Platform

Chinese name
- Simplified Chinese: 中新站
- Traditional Chinese: 中新站
Transcriptions

General information
- Location: Middle Zhucun Avenue (G324), Zengcheng District, Guangzhou, Guangdong; China
- Coordinates: 23.288261°N 113.607986°E
- Operated by: Guangzhou Metro Co. Ltd.
- Line: Line 21
- Platforms: 2 (1 island platform)
- Tracks: 4

Construction
- Structure type: Underground
- Accessible: Yes

Other information
- Station code: 2115

History
- Opened: 28 December 2018; 7 years ago

Services
Preceding station	Guangzhou Metro	Following station
Zhenlong towards Tianhe Park	Line 21	Kengbei towards Zengcheng Square
Location

Zhongxin station (Chinese: 中新站) is a station of Line 21 of the Guangzhou Metro. It started operations on 28 December 2018.

== Exits ==
There are 3 exits, lettered A, C and D. Exit D is accessible. All exits are located on Fengguang Road.

== Gallery ==
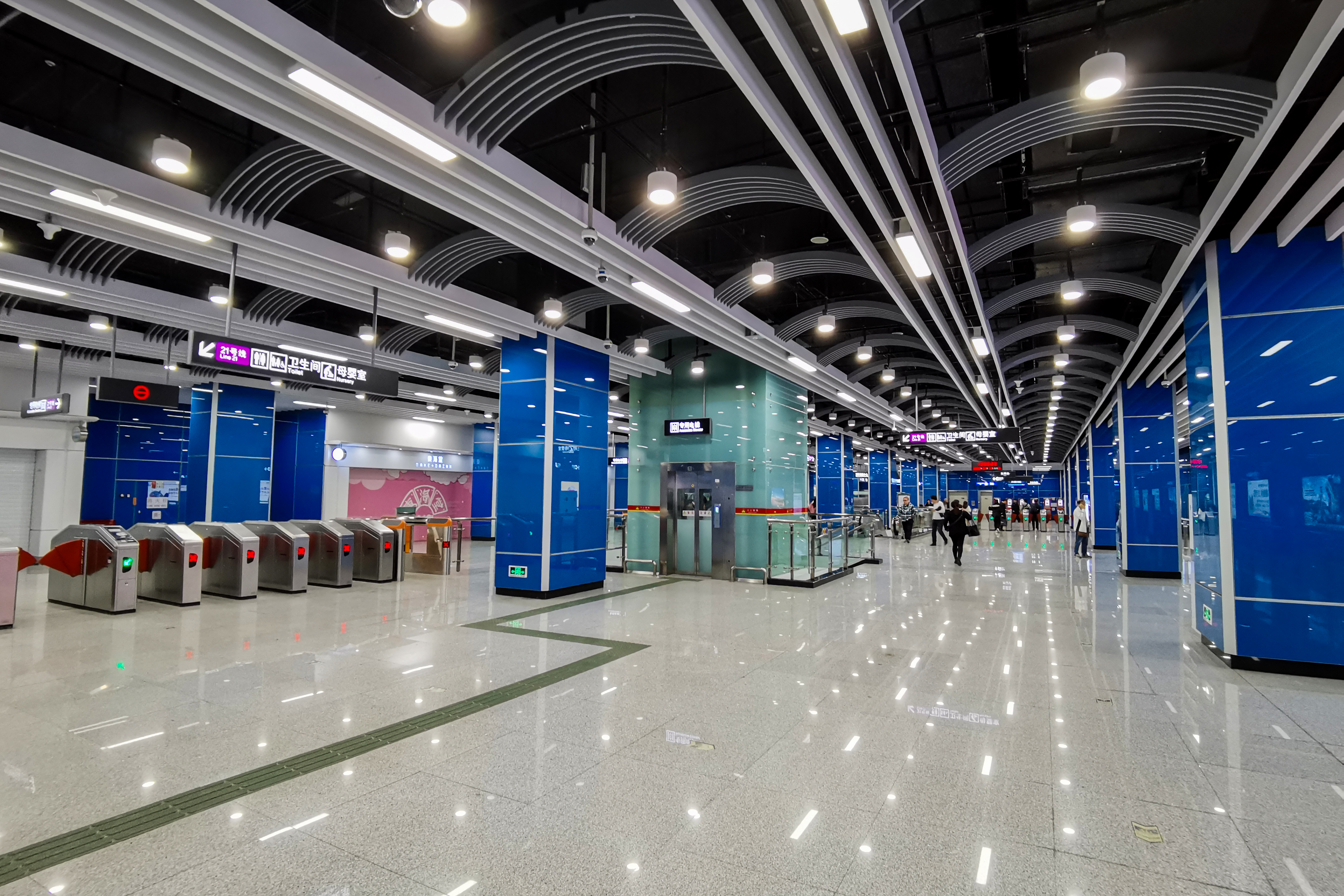
Concourse

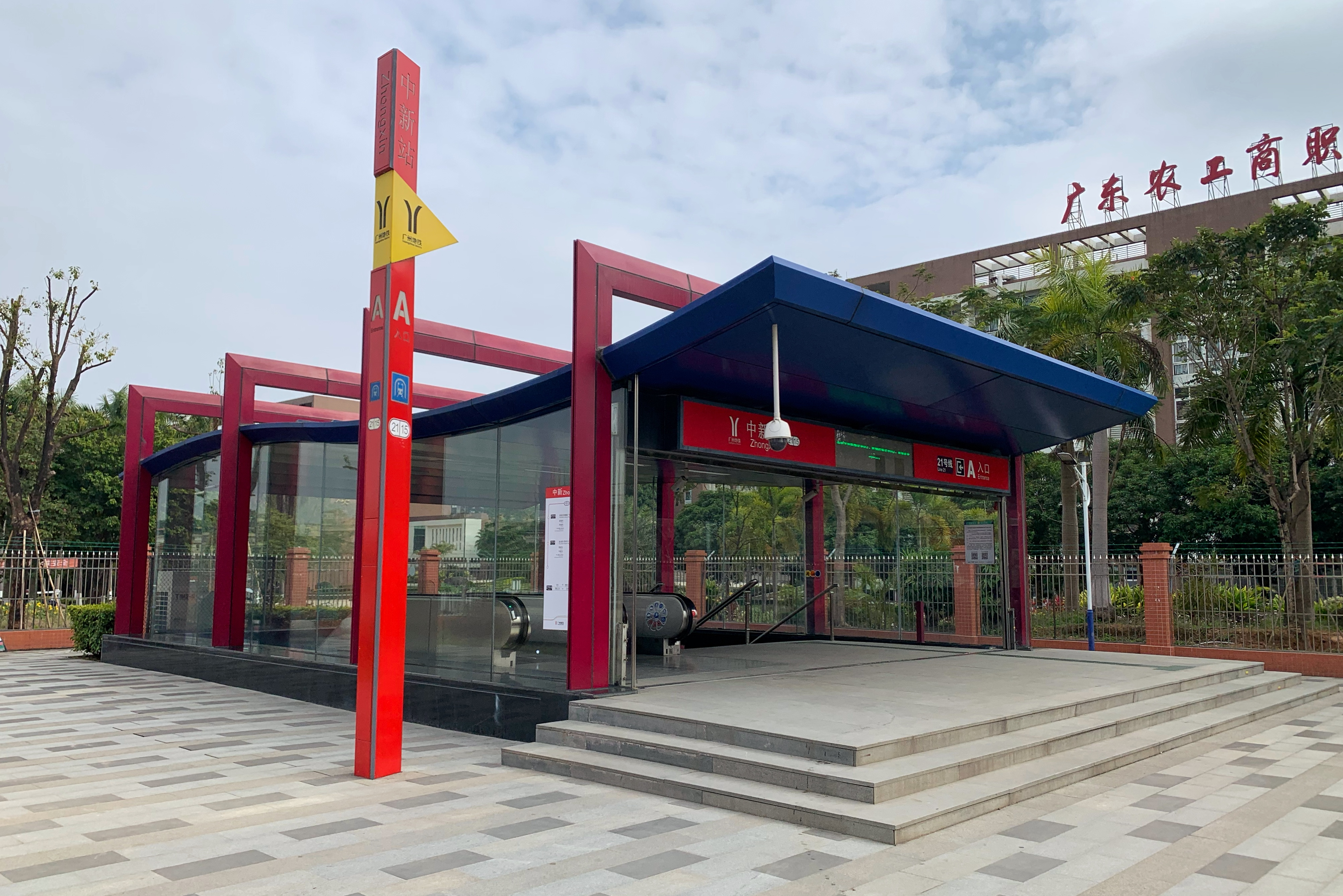
Exit A

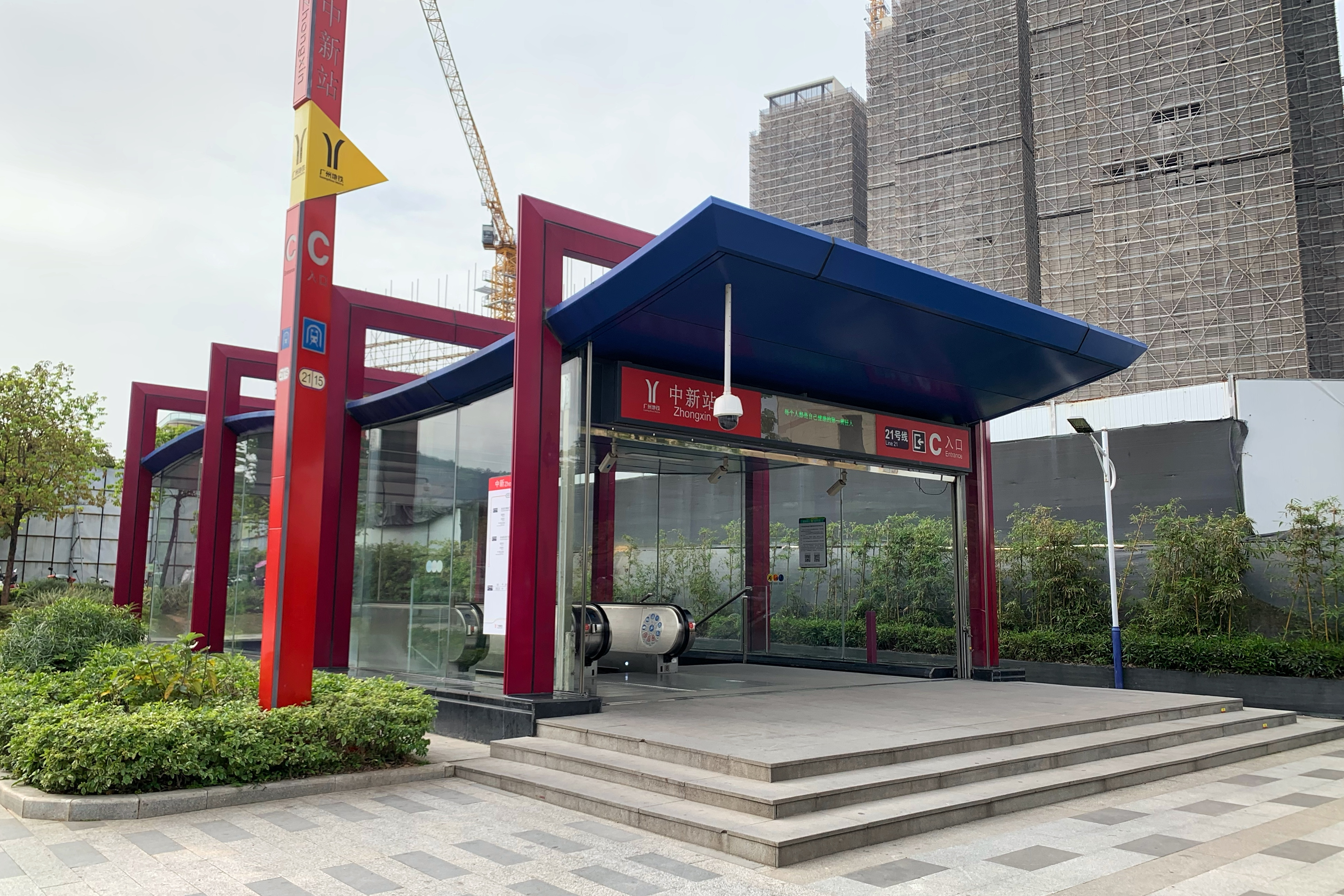
Exit C

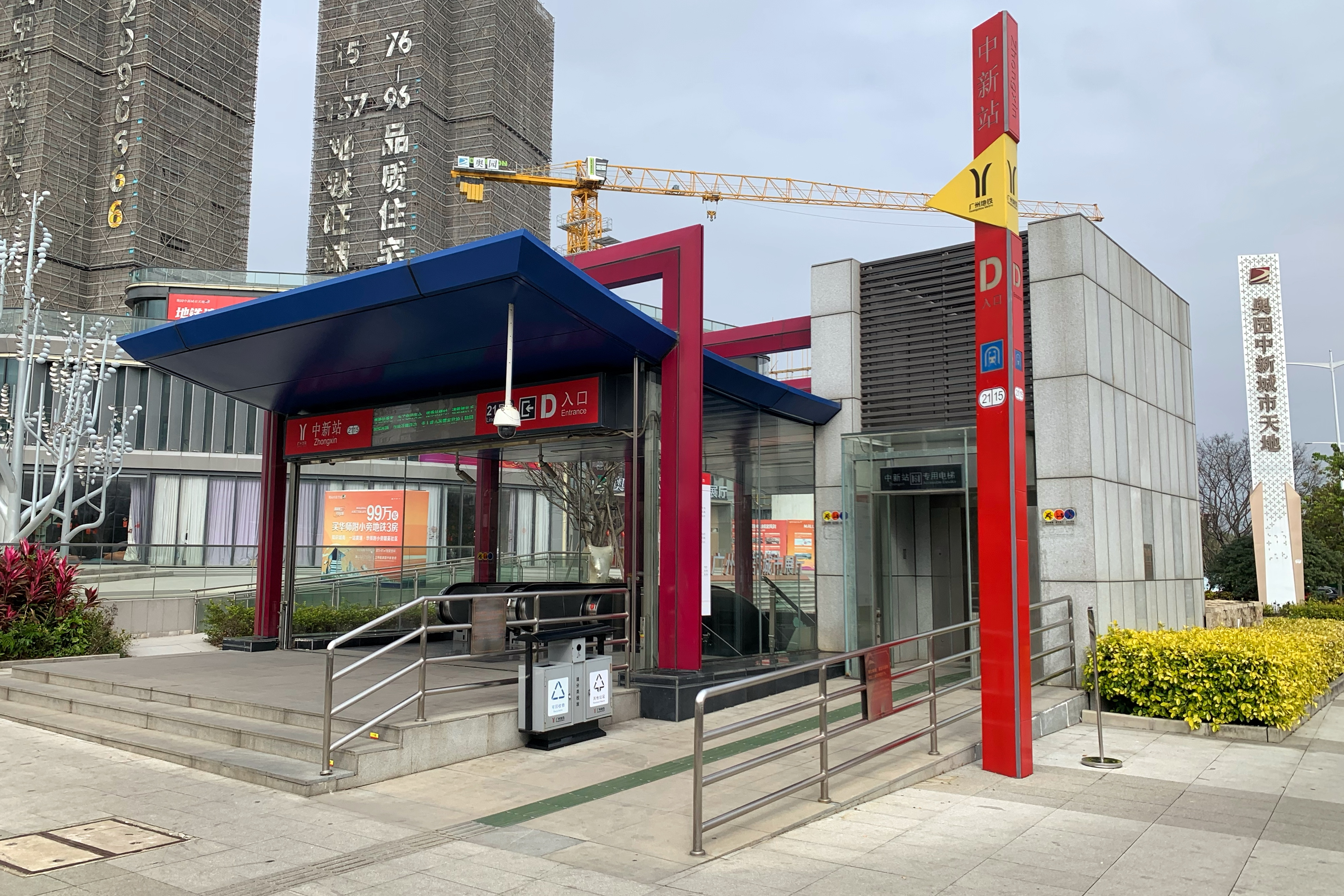
Exit D
