= Utahloy International School Zengcheng =

School in Guangzhou, China

- Traditional Chinese: 廣州增城譽德萊外籍人員子女學校
- Simplified Chinese: 广州增城誉德莱外籍人员子女学校
Transcriptions
Standard Mandarin
- Hanyu Pinyin: Guǎngzhōu Zēngchéng Yùdélái Wàijí Rényuán Zǐnǚ Xuéxiào
Yue: Cantonese
- Jyutping: gwong2 zau1 zang1 sing4 jyu6 dak1 loi4 ngoi6 zik6 jan4 jyun4 zi2 neoi5 hok6 haau6

Alternative Chinese name
- Traditional Chinese: 增城譽德萊國際學校
- Simplified Chinese: 增城誉德莱国际学校
Transcriptions
Standard Mandarin
- Hanyu Pinyin: Zēngchéng Yùdélái Guójì Xuéxiào
Yue: Cantonese
- Jyutping: zang1 sing4 jyu6 dak1 loi4 gwok3 zai3 hok6 haau6

Utahloy International School Zengcheng (UISZ or UISZC, Chinese: 广州增城誉德莱外籍人员子女学校) is an international school in Sanjiang Town (三江镇; 三江鎮; Sānjiāngzhèn; saam1 gong1 zan3), Zengcheng, Guangzhou, China. UISZ offers day school and boarding school programs for students in Kindergarten through Grade 12. The school currently serves approximately 200 students in grades K-12, with 120 in primary and 80 in secondary.

The Chinese name was originally 增城裕达隆国际学校 when the school was established on 14 July 1998. On 6 June 2012, the Chinese name became 增城誉德莱国际学校.

== Boarding ==
Boarding students reside in the Dragon House (龙之家; 龍之家; Lóng zhī Jiā; lung4 zi1 gaa1). There are four floors, each with 36 rooms and four students per room.
