= Nzingha Stewart =

American filmmaker

Nzingha Stewart is an American filmmaker. She began her career directing music videos, later moving to the television and movie industry in 2010 with the drama For Colored Girls as an executive producer. She has directed two movies for Lifetime, With This Ring and Love by the 10th Date. In 2019, Netflix released Stewart's first feature film, Tall Girl.

== Education ==
Stewart attended New York University's Gallatin School, and graduated with a degree in philosophy.

== Career ==
=== Music videos ===
Stewart began her career directing music videos, working with Macy Gray, Common, Eve, Keyshia Cole, Sunshine Anderson, Joss Stone, Jay-Z, Missy Elliott, Bilal, and 50 Cent. Clutch writer explains of Stewart's music video work: "With incredible artistic direction and originality, Nzingha provides imagery, mood, and storyline effortlessly."

=== Film and television ===
She has directed episodes of Maid, Pretty Little Liars, Grey's Anatomy, Major Crimes, How To Get Away With Murder, and Unreal.

Stewart has directed one movie for Lifetime and has a second in-production. With This Ring aired in 2015, "explor[ing] relationships between four African-American women who vow to get married within a year of attending a friend’s wedding," starring Regina Hall, Jill Scott, and Eve. Stewart earned two nominations at the 47th NAACP Image Awards for With This Ring, Outstanding Directing in a Motion Picture (Television) and Outstanding Writing in a Motion Picture (Television). The movie was also a commercial success, becoming one of the five most-viewed movies on Lifetime that year and a cable television ratings success among women; IndieWire said, "Lifetime has struck ratings gold by betting on" female directors including Stewart.

Stewart's next Lifetime movie The 10th Date is "a comedy that follows four friends who embark on an often hilarious journey to successfully get to that elusive tenth date--a holy grail in the dating world when they think a man finally feels committed." It began filming in Los Angeles in 2016, to air in 2017. Meagan Good, Kelly Rowland, Keri Hilson, Kellee Stewart, Cat Deeley, and Brandon T. Jackson will appear in the movie; Stewart writes and directs.

For BET, Stewart directed Our Icon, a documentary about Michael Jackson.

In May 2016, Hulu announced it is developing a comedy series Bitches to be written by Stewart and G. L. Lambert and produced by Ben Stiller. Adapted from the 2013 Brazilian series As Canalhas, Bitches follows a "different woman each week confiding her dirty deeds and misadventures to her hair stylist."

In 2010, Stewart served as an executive producer of For Colored Girls.

In 2019, it was announced that Stewart would direct the Netflix film Tall Girl.

In 2021, it was announced that Stewart would direct the pilot as well as four additional episodes of From Scratch, a Netflix limited series from showrunner Attica Locke. The project, executive produced by Reese Witherspoon, Zoe Saldaña and Lauren Neustadter, was adapted from the 2019 Tembi Locke memoir entitled From Scratch: A Memoir of Love, Sicily and Finding Home.

In 2021, Stewart directed two episodes of Maid.

In 2023, Stewart directed the last 5 episodes of Daisy Jones & the Six.

== Awards ==
In 2015, Stewart was nominated for a Women's Image Network Award for her film With This Ring. She was nominated for both Outstanding Film Directed by a Woman and Outstanding Film Written by a Woman. In 2016, she was nominated for an NAACP Image Award for With This Ring for both Outstanding Writing in a Motion Picture (Television) and Outstanding Directing in a Motion Picture (Television). In 2021, she was again nominated for an Image Award for an episode of Little Fires Everywhere (miniseries) for Outstanding Directing in a Drama Series. In 2020, she was also nominated for a Black Reel Awards for Little Fires Everywhere (miniseries) for Outstanding Directing, TV Movie/Limited Series.
