= Mitzi Miller =

Writer and magazine editor

- Born: United States
- Occupations: Writer, editor

Mitzi Miller is an American writer and magazine editor. She was editor-in-chief of Jet from 2011 to 2014, then of Ebony from 2014 to 2015. She also co-authored the 2006 novel The Vow, adapted by Nzingha Stewart as 2015 Lifetime movie With This Ring. In 2015, she became head of development for Rob Hardy's production company, Rainforest Entertainment. In 2014, she was named to the number 16 spot on The Root 100 list.
