= Through the Perilous Fight =

Through the Perilous Fight and similar phrases could refer to:

- "...Through the Perilous Fight... ", a phrase from the national anthem of the United States, "The Star-Spangled Banner"
- Perilous Fight: America's Intrepid War with Britain on the High Seas, 1812–1815, a 2011 book by Stephen Budiansky
- The Perilous Fight: America's World War II in Color, a 2003 American television series aired on PBS
- Through the Perilous Fight: From the Burning of Washington to the Star-Spangled Banner -- The Six Weeks That Saved the Nation, a book by Steve Vogel
- "The Perilous Night", a 2017 song by Drive-By Truckers
