= Mountain Conservation Trust of Georgia =

Nonprofit organization in Georgia, United States

- Mountain Conservation Trust of Georgia Inc
- Abbreviation: MCTGA
- Type: Nonprofit
- Tax ID no.: 58-2123670
- Legal status: 501(c)(3)
- Headquarters: Jasper, Georgia
- Website: https://mctga.org/

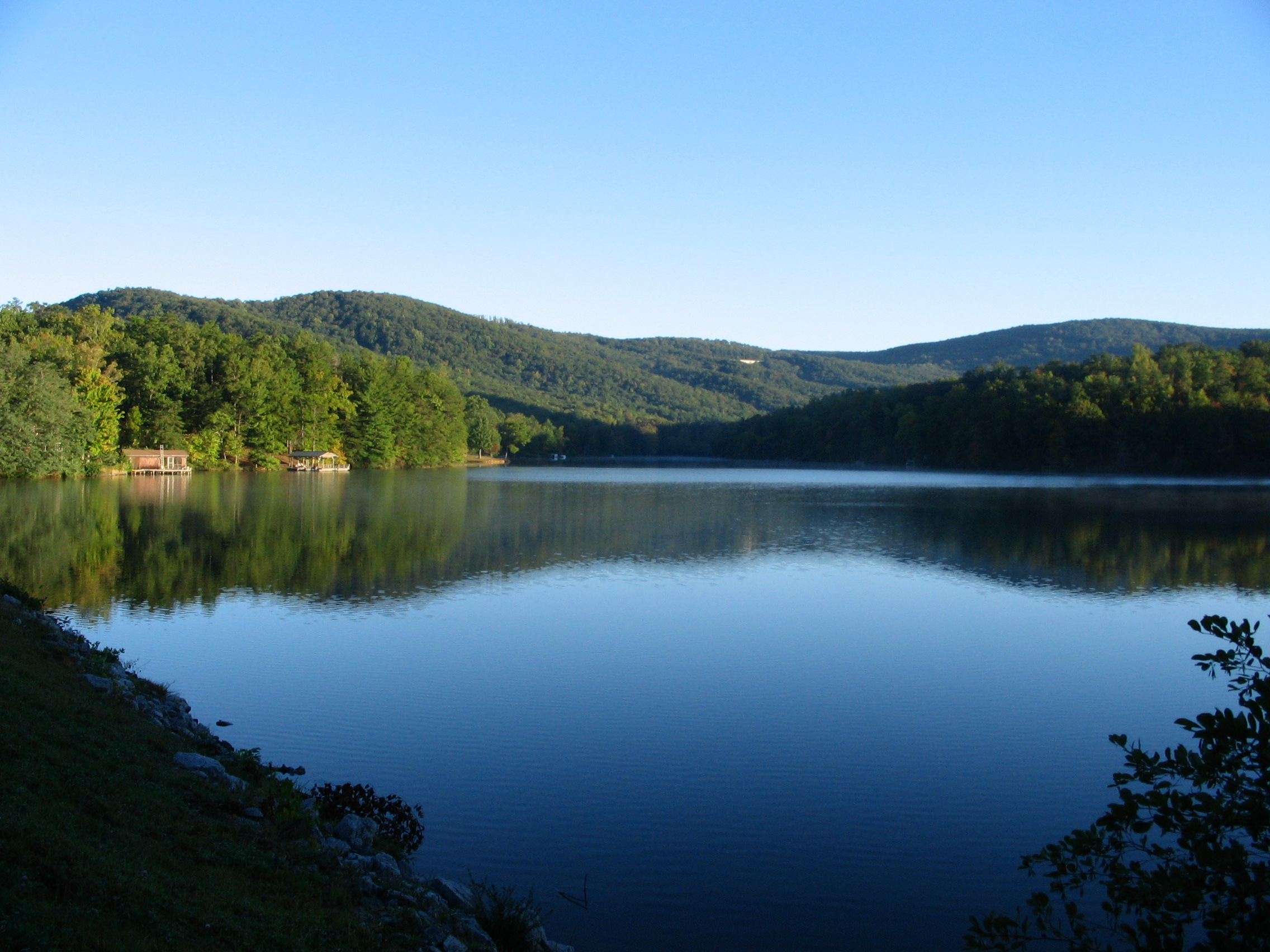
The Burnt Mountain Preserve, the largest single property protected by the MCTGA

The Mountain Conservation Trust of Georgia (MCTGA) is a 501(c)3 nonprofit.

The Mountain Conservation Trust of Georgia (MCTGA) is dedicated to the permanent conservation of the natural resources and scenic beauty of the North Georgia foothills and mountains. With a mission focused only on the North Georgia mountains and foothills region, we serve as a regional catalyst for critical conservation efforts in North Georgia.

The Etowah River watershed and Lake Allatoona are identified in the top tier of importance for protecting drinking water. Maps created by the US Forest Service show areas of the country that are experiencing high consumer water demand and are facing significant development threats. The darker blue the watershed, the higher the importance of the watershed.
