= Zengcheng, Guangzhou =

Zengcheng 增城区 Tsengshing
- District
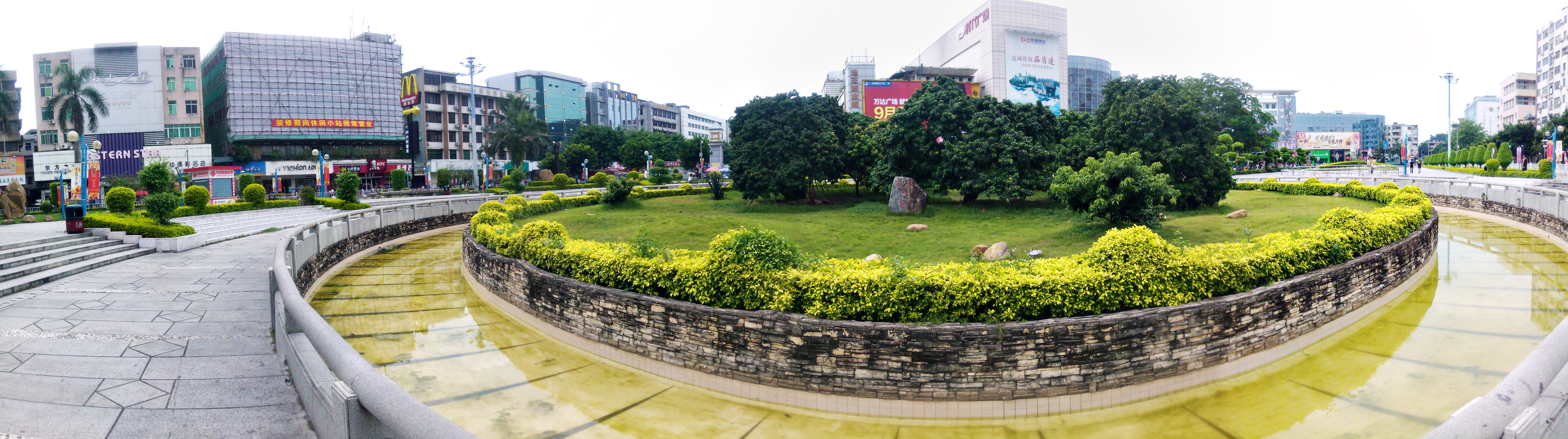
- Gualü Square in Licheng Subdistrict

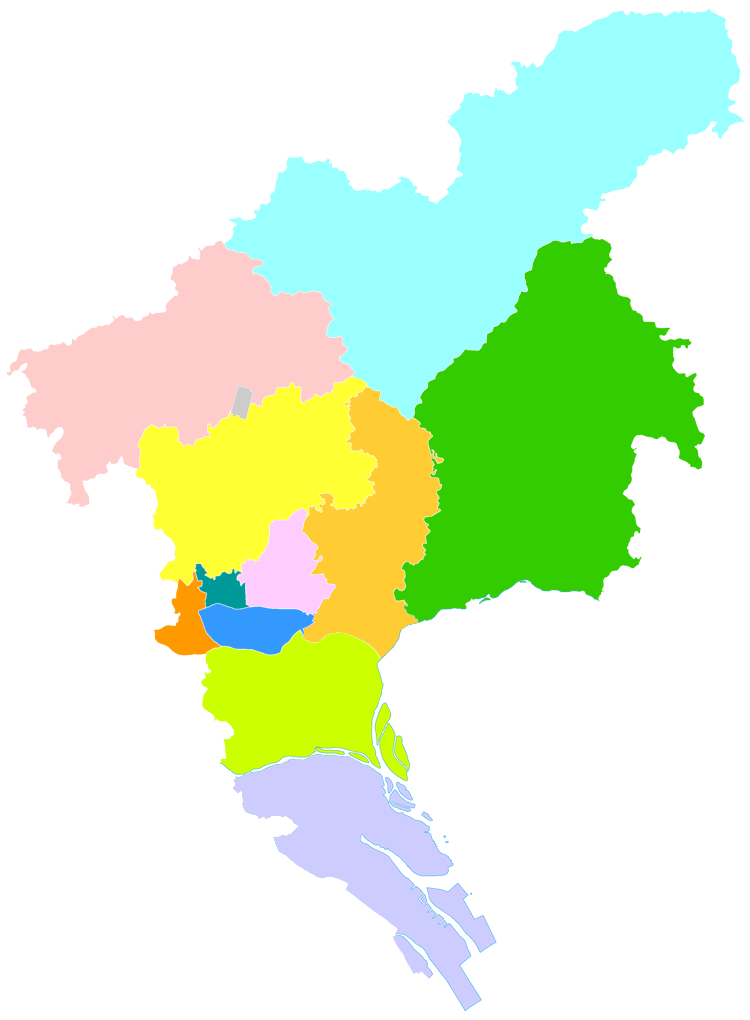
- Zengcheng in Guangzhou
- Country: People's Republic of China
- Province: Guangdong
- Sub-provincial city: Guangzhou

Area
  - Total: 1,741.4 km^{2} (672.4 sq mi)

Population (2020 census)
  - Total: 1,466,331
  - Density: 842.04/km^{2} (2,180.9/sq mi)
- Time zone: UTC+8 (China Standard)
- Postal code: 511300
- Area code: 020
- Website: http://www.zengcheng.gov.cn/

Zengcheng
- Chinese: 增城
- Guangdong Romanization: Zeng1-xing4
- Hanyu Pinyin: Zēngchéng
- Postal: Tsengshing
- Literal meaning: Expanding City
Transcriptions
Standard Mandarin
- Hanyu Pinyin: Zēngchéng
Yue: Cantonese
- Yale Romanization: Jāngsìhng
- Jyutping: Zang1 sing4
- Canton Romanization: Zeng1-xing4

Zengcheng District (alternately romanized as Tsengshing) (Note: Zengcheng was also formerly romanized as Tsang-ching.) is one of 11 urban districts of the prefecture-level city of Guangzhou, the capital of Guangdong Province, China.

== History ==
Zengcheng County was established under the Qin following their conquest of the area, formerly held by the Baiyue tribes. Under the Ming, the northern area of the county was separated to form Longmen County, administered from Huizhou. The county was promoted to city status in 1993. In 2006, a western section of Zengcheng was severed to form Guangzhou's Luogang District, which was renamed Huangpu in 2014. On 12 February of the same year, Zengcheng was annexed to Guangzhou as a district. A riot of migrant workers occurred in Zengcheng in 2011.

== Climate ==
Zengcheng's mild climate, fertile land, annual average temperature of 22.02 degrees and average yearly rainfall of 1,967 millimetres (77.4 in) make it suitable for tropical and subtropical crop growth. The district is noted for production of the lychee.

Climate data for Zengcheng, elevation 31 m (102 ft), (1991–2020 normals, extremes 1963–present)
Month	Jan	Feb	Mar	Apr	May	Jun	Jul	Aug	Sep	Oct	Nov	Dec	Year
Record high °C (°F)	27.4 (81.3)	28.7 (83.7)	33.1 (91.6)	33.7 (92.7)	35.3 (95.5)	37.0 (98.6)	38.6 (101.5)	37.4 (99.3)	37.8 (100.0)	36.1 (97.0)	33.6 (92.5)	30.6 (87.1)	38.6 (101.5)
Mean daily maximum °C (°F)	19.1 (66.4)	20.4 (68.7)	22.7 (72.9)	26.6 (79.9)	30.0 (86.0)	31.9 (89.4)	33.4 (92.1)	33.3 (91.9)	32.1 (89.8)	29.3 (84.7)	25.4 (77.7)	20.8 (69.4)	27.1 (80.7)
Daily mean °C (°F)	13.9 (57.0)	15.6 (60.1)	18.4 (65.1)	22.4 (72.3)	25.6 (78.1)	27.5 (81.5)	28.5 (83.3)	28.2 (82.8)	26.9 (80.4)	23.8 (74.8)	19.7 (67.5)	15.2 (59.4)	22.1 (71.9)
Mean daily minimum °C (°F)	10.5 (50.9)	12.4 (54.3)	15.3 (59.5)	19.4 (66.9)	22.6 (72.7)	24.6 (76.3)	25.2 (77.4)	25.1 (77.2)	23.6 (74.5)	20.1 (68.2)	16.0 (60.8)	11.6 (52.9)	18.9 (66.0)
Record low °C (°F)	−1.9 (28.6)	3.0 (37.4)	6.2 (43.2)	9.2 (48.6)	15.4 (59.7)	17.9 (64.2)	19.6 (67.3)	21.7 (71.1)	15.7 (60.3)	8.6 (47.5)	5.7 (42.3)	0.0 (32.0)	−1.9 (28.6)
Average precipitation mm (inches)	49.1 (1.93)	54.4 (2.14)	113.8 (4.48)	234.5 (9.23)	337.8 (13.30)	455.6 (17.94)	243.5 (9.59)	266.7 (10.50)	161.5 (6.36)	47.5 (1.87)	36.6 (1.44)	38.5 (1.52)	2,039.5 (80.3)
Average precipitation days (≥ 0.1 mm)	7.0	9.4	14.0	15.5	18.3	20.1	17.8	17.1	12.5	5.5	5.2	5.8	148.2
Average relative humidity (%)	73	77	81	83	83	84	82	83	81	76	73	70	79
Mean monthly sunshine hours	129.6	90.0	71.0	80.0	115.3	131.3	188.3	181.5	187.4	202.5	175.1	164.2	1,716.2
Percentage possible sunshine	38	28	19	21	28	32	46	46	51	57	53	50	39
Source: China Meteorological Administrationall-time extremesall-time November high

== Administrative divisions ==
There are currently 6 subdistricts and 7 towns.

On 28 August 2012 one new subdistrict (Yongning) and one new town (Xiancun) were established from carving out of Xintang.

Name	Chinese (S)	Hanyu Pinyin	Canton Romanization	Population (2010)	Area (km^{2})
Licheng Subdistrict	荔城街道	Lìchéng Jiēdào	lei6 séng4 gai1 dou6	191,777	132.27
Lihu Subdistrict	荔湖街道	Lìhú Jiēdào	lei6 wu4 gai1 dou6	191,777	132.27
Zengjiang Subdistrict	增江街道	Zēngjiāng Jiēdào	zeng1 gong1 gai1 dou6	78,072	86.18
Zhucun Subdistrict	朱村街道	Zhūcūn Jiēdào	ju1 qun1 gai1 dou6	43,557	93.90
Yongning Subdistrict	永宁街道	Yǒngníng Jiēdào	wing5 ning4 gai1 dou6	391,287	104.14
Ningxi Subdistrict	宁西街道	Níngxī Jiēdào	ning4 ség6 gai1 dou6	391,287	104.14
Xintang town	新塘镇	Xīntáng Zhèn	sen1 tong4 zen3	391,287	85.09
Xiancun town	仙村镇	Xiāncūn Zhèn	xin1 qun1 zen3	391,287	56.65
Zhengguo town	正果镇	Zhèngguǒ Zhèn	zéng3 guo2 zen3	40,387	236.40
Shitan town	石滩镇	Shítān Zhèn	ség6 tan1 zen3	121,674	184.00
Zhongxin town	中新镇	Zhōngxīn Zhèn	zung1 sen1 zen3	78,293	236.00
Paitan town	派潭镇	Pàitán Zhèn	pai3 tam4 zen3	58,337	289.50
Xiaolou town	小楼镇	Xiǎolóu Zhèn	xiu2 leo4 zen3	33,725	136.00

== Demography ==
Owing to the distance from Guangzhou's city center, many locals consider themselves distinct from the other Guangzhounese. They also speak separate Yue and Hakka dialects.

== Transportation ==
=== Metro ===
Zengcheng is currently serviced by two metro lines operated by Guangzhou Metro:

- Line 13 - Shacun, Baijiang, Xintang, Guanhu, Xinsha
- Line 21 - Zhongxin, Kengbei, Fenggang, Zhucun, Shantian, Zhonggang, Zengcheng Square

== Education ==
=== Colleges ===
- Guangdong University of Technology Huali College
- Guangzhou University Songtian College
- Guangdong University of Finance & Economics Huashang College
- Guangzhou Kangda Vocational Technical College

=== International schools ===
- Utahloy International School Zengcheng
- Fettes College Guangzhou

== Notable people ==
- Zhan Ruo Shui (湛若水): male philosopher of Ming dynasty
- Leung Kwok Hung (梁國雄): Hong Kong male politician
- Hélène Wong (黃喜蓮): female Chinese New Zealand writer, her publishing includes being Chinese: My Own Story
