= 46th Daytime Creative Arts Emmy Awards =

- Date: May 3, 2019
- Location: Pasadena Civic Auditorium; Pasadena, California, U.S.
- Country: United States
- Presented by: NATAS; ATAS
- Most awards: The Young and the Restless (5)

The 46th Annual Daytime Creative Arts Emmy Awards, were presented by the National Academy of Television Arts and Sciences (NATAS), honoring the best in US daytime television programming in 2018. The winners were announced in a ceremony at Pasadena Civic Auditorium in Pasadena, California on May 3, 2019, two days prior the main awards ceremony.

The nominations for both the main ceremony categories and the creative arts categories were announced on March 20, 2019. French-American chef and television personality Jacques Pépin received the Lifetime Achievement Award.

== Winners and nominees ==
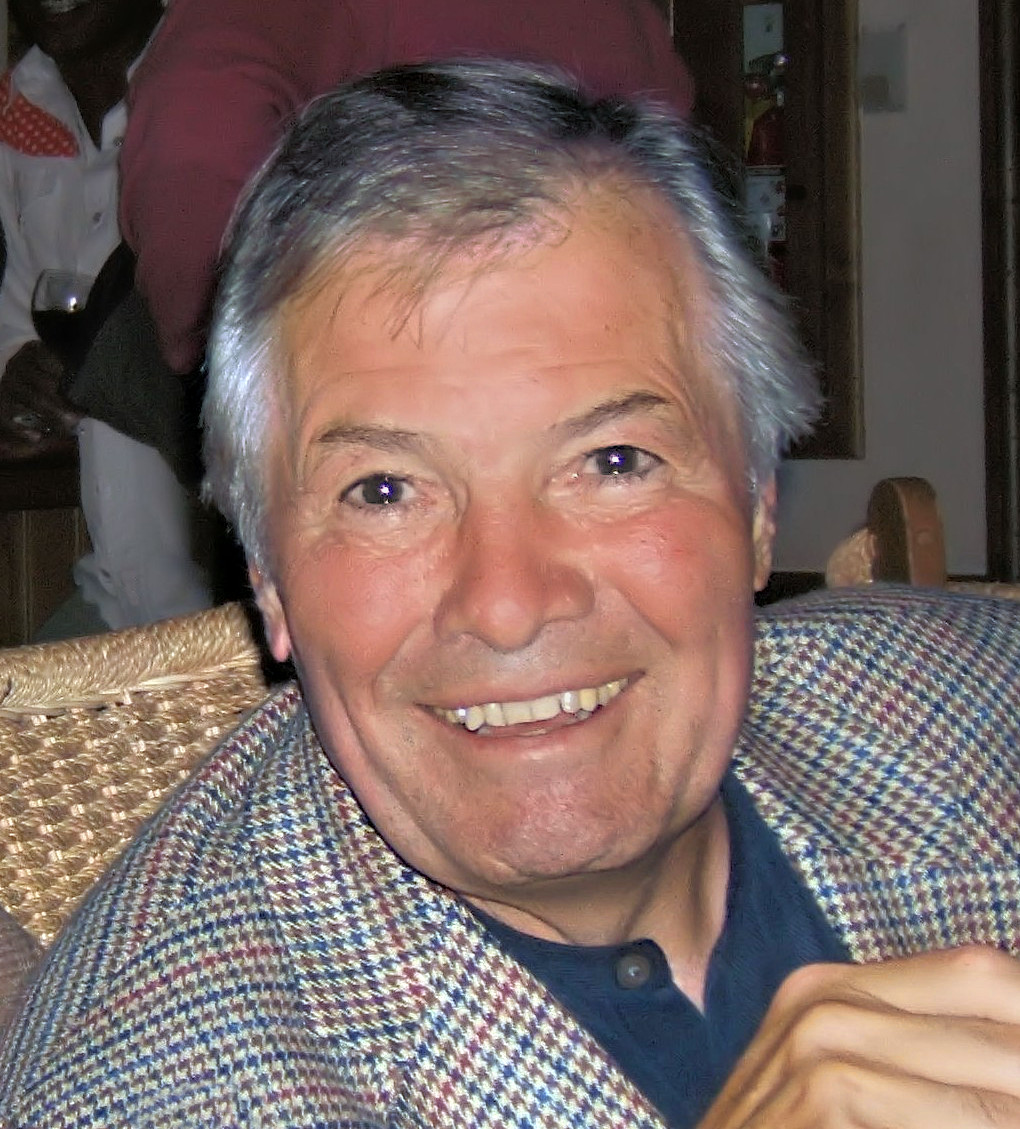
Jacques Pépin, Lifetime Achievement Award recipient

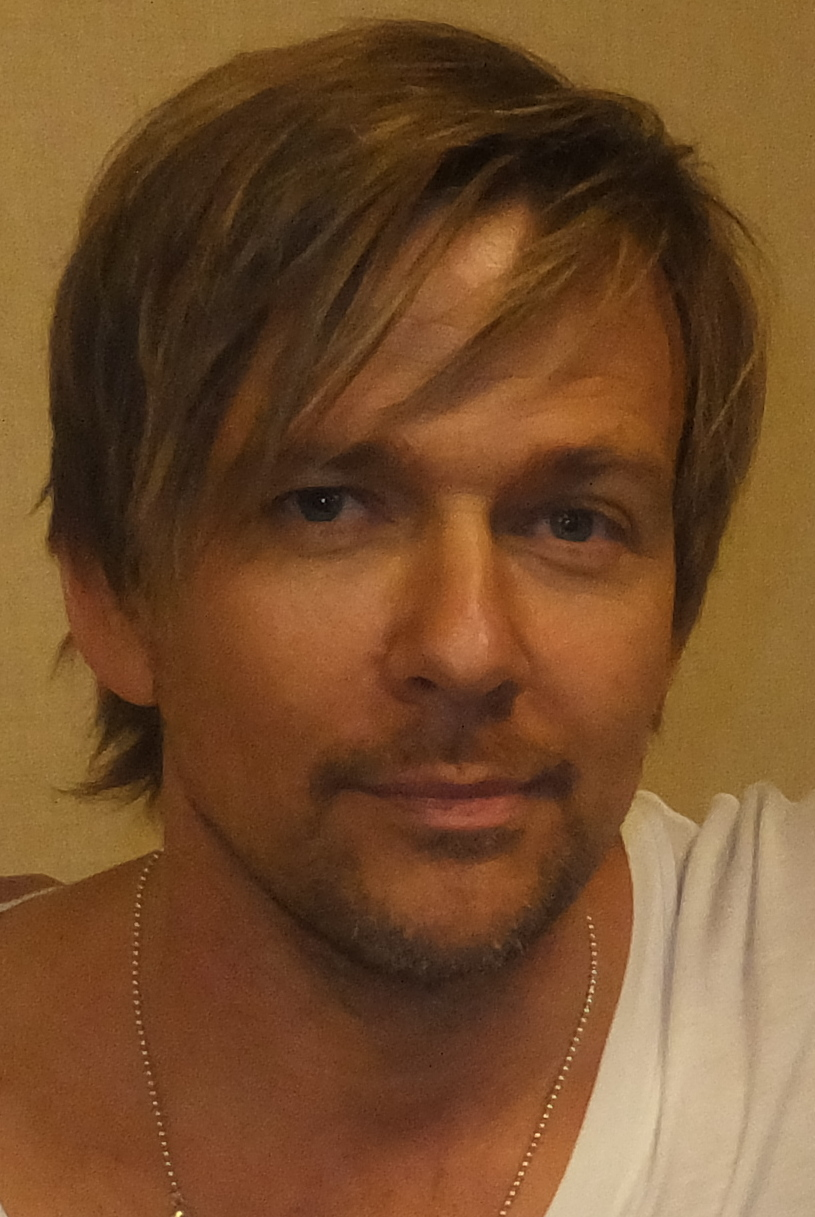
Sean Patrick Flanery, Outstanding Guest Performer in a Digital Drama Series winner

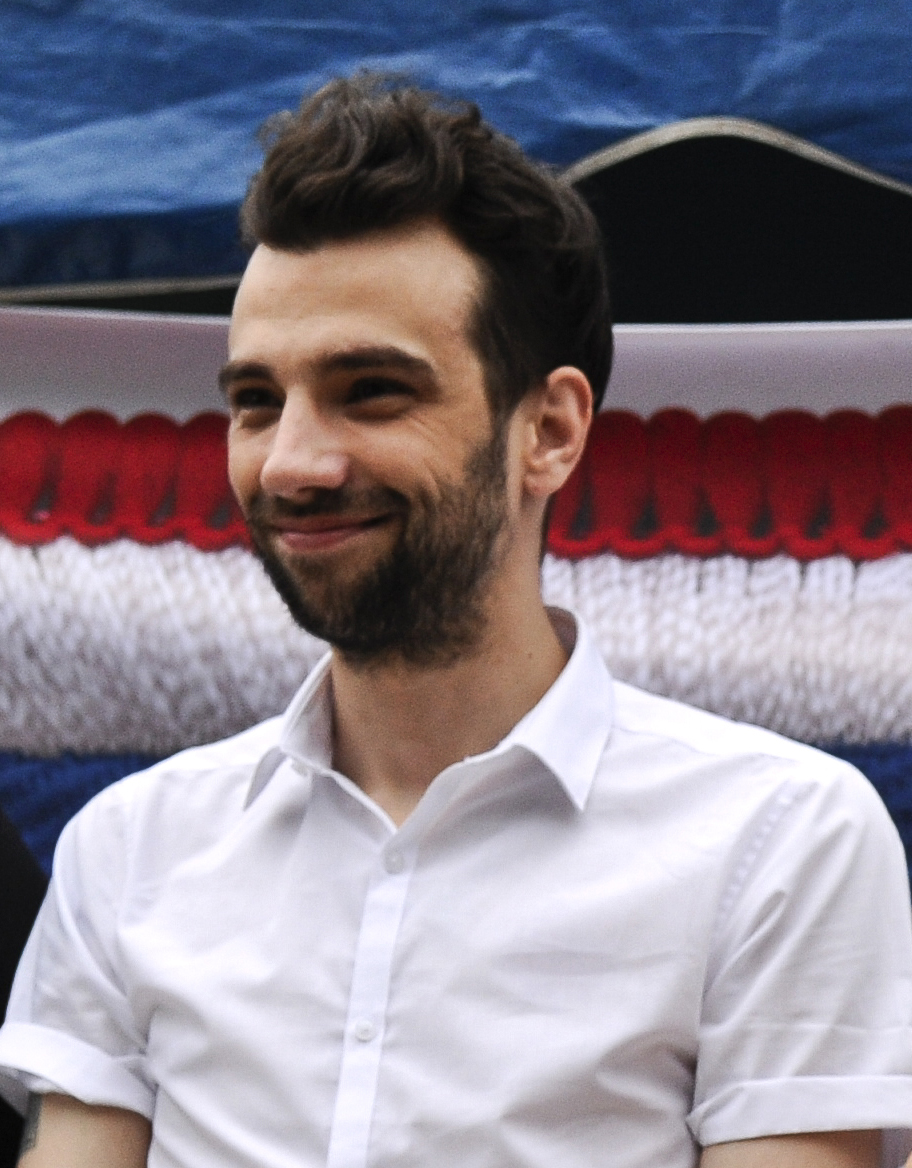
Jay Baruchel, Outstanding Performer in an Animated Program winner

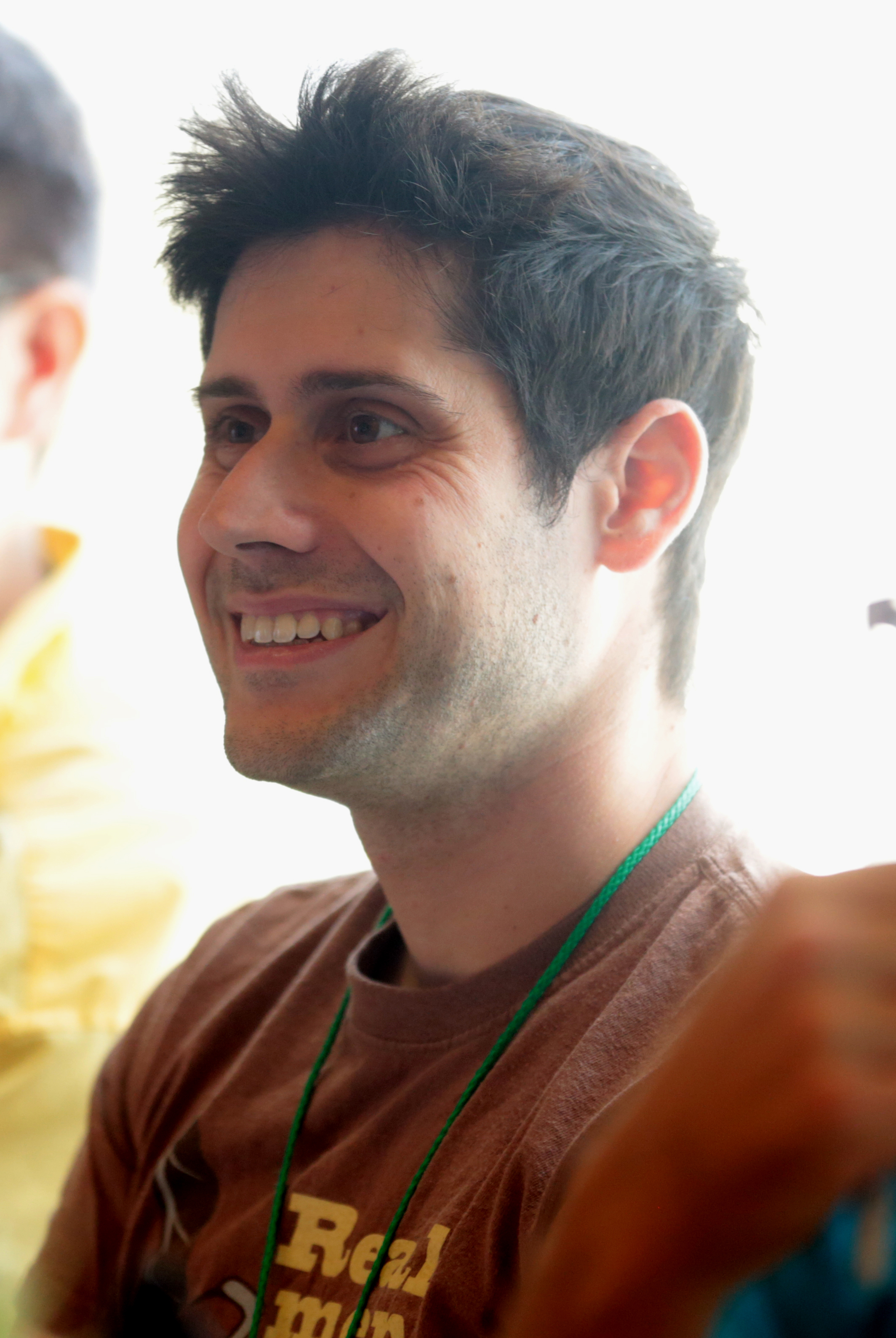
Ben Diskin, Outstanding Performer in a Preschool Animated Program winner

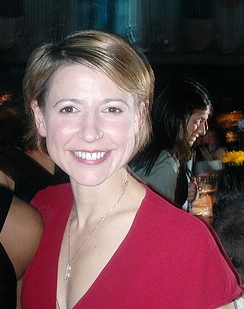
Samantha Brown, Outstanding Host for a Lifestyle, Children's or Special Class Program winner

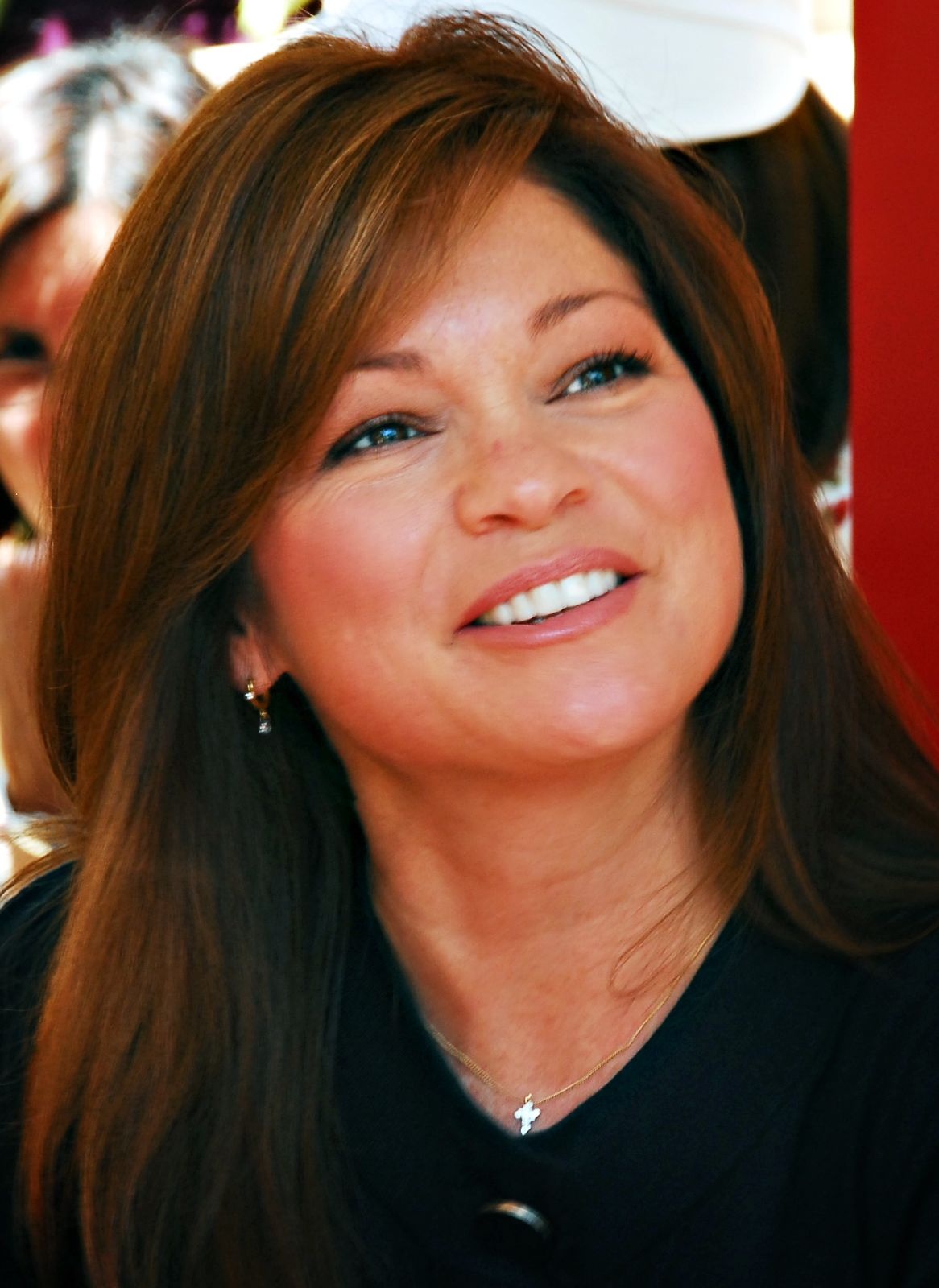
Valerie Bertinelli, Outstanding Culinary Host winner

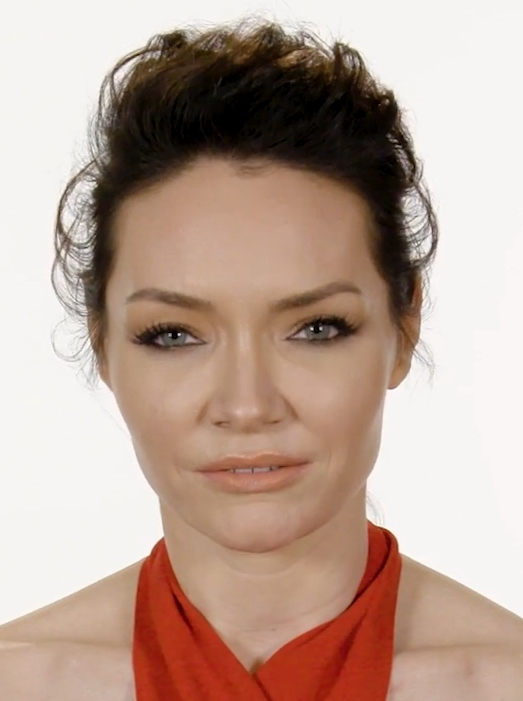
Katrina Lenk, Outstanding Musical Performance in a Daytime Program co-winner

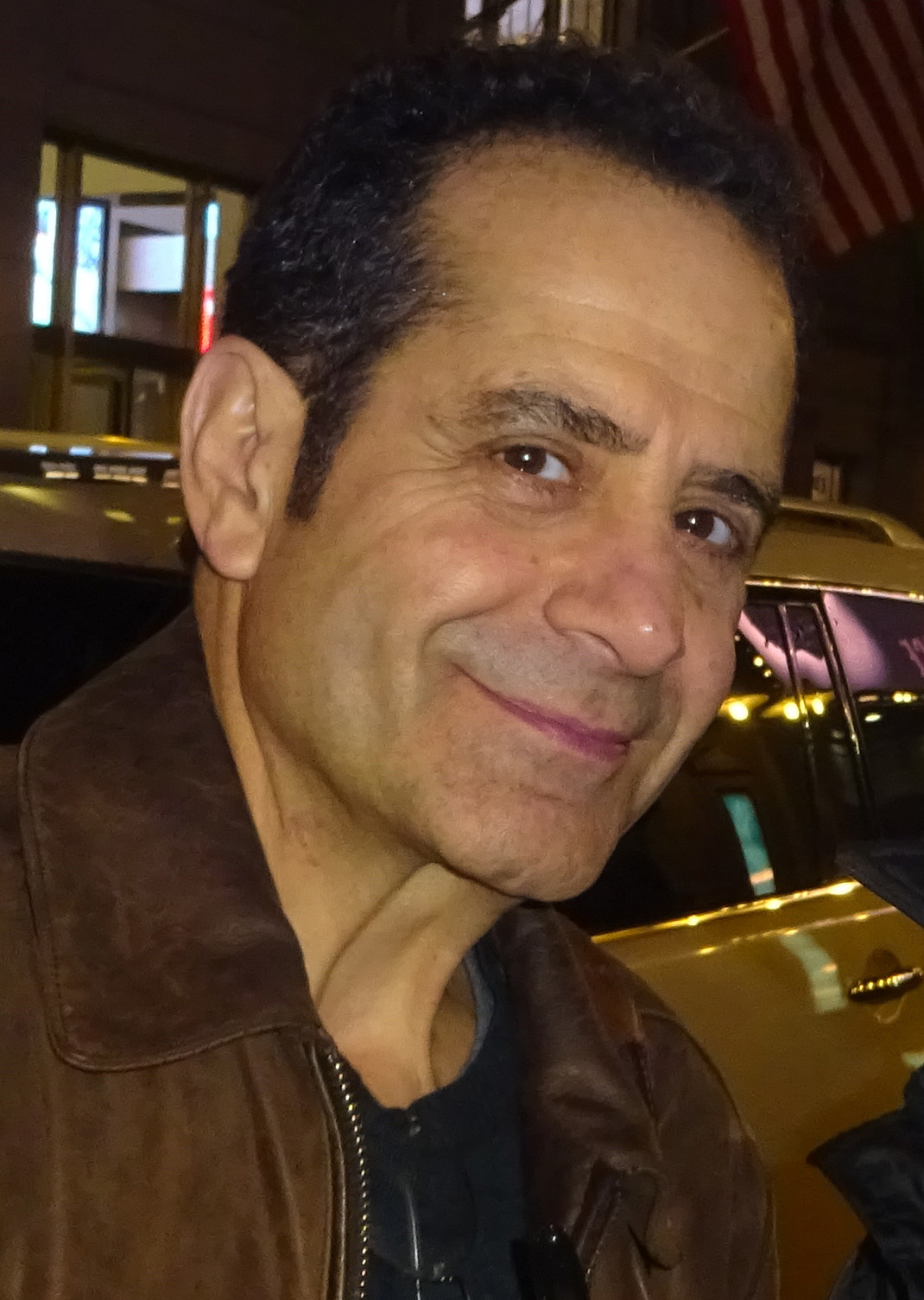
Tony Shalhoub, Outstanding Musical Performance in a Daytime Program co-winner

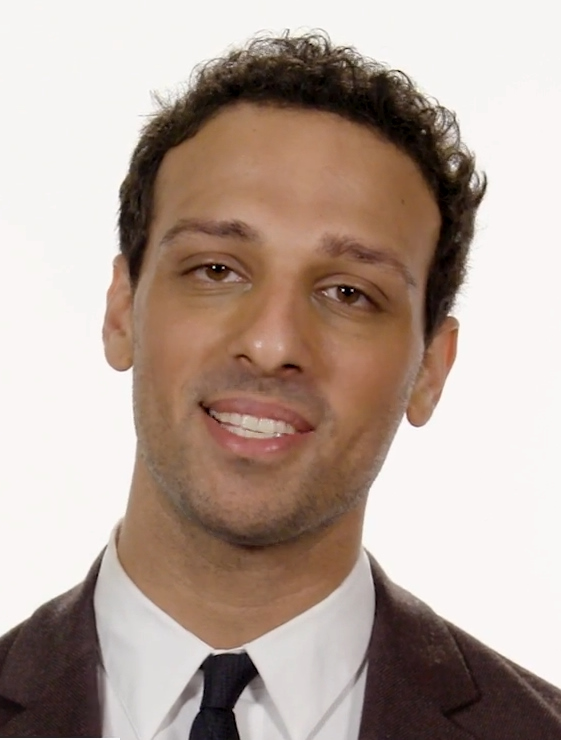
Ari'el Stachel, Outstanding Musical Performance in a Daytime Program co-winner

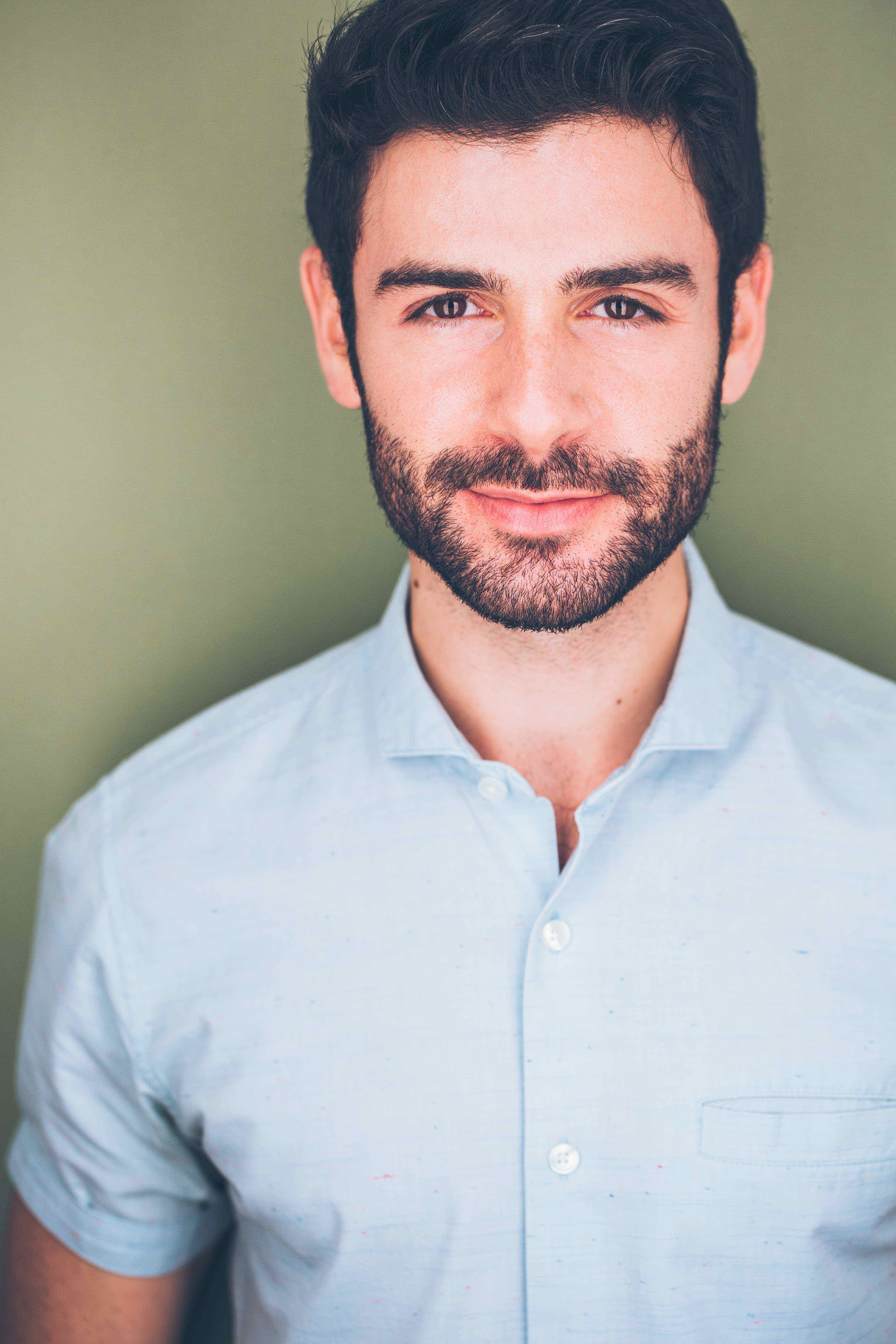
Adam Kantor, Outstanding Musical Performance in a Daytime Program co-winner

The winners are listed first, in boldface.

=== Lifetime Achievement Award ===
- **Jacques Pépin**

=== Programming ===
Outstanding Preschool Children's Series	Outstanding Children's or Family Viewing Program
**Sesame Street (HBO)**; The Big Fun Crafty Show (Universal Kids); Dino Dana (Amazon Prime Video); Miss Persona (YouTube); Snug's House (Universal Kids)	**Odd Squad (PBS)**; American Ninja Warrior Junior (Universal Kids); Chicken Soup for The Soul's Hidden Heroes (The CW); Top Chef Junior (Universal Kids); The Who Was? Show (Netflix)
Outstanding Short Format Children's Program	Outstanding Pre-School Children's Animated Program
**Nick Jr Color Song: RED (Nickelodeon)**; Canticos (Nickelodeon); Nick Jr Block Party: Quest for the Golden Cube (Nickelodeon); Sesame Street: Elmo's Food Rap Battle (YouTube); Sesame Street: A Rainbow Kind of Day (YouTube)	**Daniel Tiger's Neighborhood (PBS)**; Ask the StoryBots (Netflix); Elena of Avalor (Disney Junior); Esme & Roy (HBO); Muppet Babies (Disney Junior); Tumble Leaf (Amazon Prime Video)
Outstanding Children's Animated Program	Outstanding Special Class Animated Program
**The Loud House (Nickelodeon)**; Disney Mickey Mouse (Disney Channel); Hilda (Netflix); Rise of the Teenage Mutant Ninja Turtles (Nickelodeon); Welcome to the Wayne (Nickelodeon)	**Watership Down (Netflix)**; Crow: The Legend (Baobab Studios); DuckTales: "The Shadow War!" (Disney Channel); PAW Patrol: "Mighty Pups" (Nickelodeon); Tumble Leaf: "Halloween Special" (Amazon Prime Video)
Outstanding Educational or Informational Series	Outstanding Culinary Program
**Weird but True! (National Geographic Kids)**; Mind Field (YouTube Premium); SciGirls (PBS); The Wildlife Docs (ABC); Xploration Awesome Planet (Syndicated)	**Valerie's Home Cooking (Food Network)**; Barefoot Contessa: Cook Like a Pro (Food Network); Cook's Country (CBS); Eat. Race. Win. (Amazon Prime Video); Giada Entertains (Food Network); Lidia's Kitchen (PBS)
Outstanding Lifestyle Series	Outstanding Travel and Adventure Program
**Ask This Old House (PBS)**; George to the Rescue (NBC); Home Made Simple with Laila Ali (OWN); Naturally, Danny Seo (NBC); This Old House (PBS)	**Samantha Brown's Places to Love (PBS)**; Born To Explore with Richard Wiese (PBS); F2 Finding Football (YouTube Premium); Jack Hanna's Into the Wild (Syndicated); Ocean Treks with Jeff Corwin (Syndicated); Rock the Park (Syndicated)
Outstanding Morning Show in Spanish	Outstanding Entertainment Program in Spanish
**¡Despierta América! (Univisión)**; Nuestro Mundo (CNN en Español); Un Nuevo Día (Telemundo)	**Six Dreams (Amazon Prime Video)**; Destinos (CNN en Español); Dr. Juan (Univisión); El Gordo y la Flaca (Univisión); Suelta la Sopa (Telemundo)
Outstanding Special Class Series	Outstanding Special Class Special
**Variety Studio: Actors on Actors (PBS)**; Close Up with The Hollywood Reporter (SundanceTV); Lucky Dog with Brandon McMillan (CBS); Mysteries & Scandals (Oxygen); To Life: How Israeli Volunteers Are Changing the World (Freeform); Working in the Theatre (AmericanTheatreWing.org)	**Quiet Heroes (Logo TV)**; Light in the Water (Logo TV); A Long Road to Freedom: The Advocate Celebrates 50 Years (Here TV); 92nd Annual Macy's Thanksgiving Day Parade (NBC); Super Soul Sunday: Oprah's Book Club: Freedom After 30 Years on Death Row (OWN)
Outstanding Special Class – Short Format Daytime Program	Outstanding Interactive Media for a Daytime Program
**Treatment Box: "Opioids" (Truth)**; Blank Wall Overhaul (Bluprint); Food Interrupted (Huffington Post); Momsplaining (Ellen Digital Network); Watchtower (Vimeo)	**Crow: The Legend (Baobab Studios)**; Ask the StoryBots (Netflix); Esme & Roy (HBO); 92nd Annual Macy's Thanksgiving Day Parade (NBC); Space Explorers (Felix & Paul Studios)
Outstanding Daytime Promotional Announcement – Topical	Outstanding Daytime Promotional Announcement – Brand Image Campaign – Network/Program
**The Star Wars Show (YouTube)**; American Ninja Warrior Junior (Universal Kids); The Ellen DeGeneres Show – 60th Birthday (Syndicated); Lifetime's 24th Annual Stop Breast Cancer for Life Campaign (Lifetime); The View – Joy's 20 Year Anniversary (ABC)	**Black History Month Campaign (Nickelodeon)**; DreamWorks Spirit Riding Free: "Seasons 5 and 7" (Netflix); Nickelodeon – Pride Month (Nickelodeon); Women's History Month Campaign (Nickelodeon); The Young and the Restless – 45th Anniversary (CBS)

=== Performance and Hosting ===
Outstanding Performance by a Lead Actor in a Digital Drama Series	Outstanding Performance by a Lead Actress in a Digital Drama Series
**Kevin Spirtas as Brian Stone on After Forever (Amazon Prime Video)**; Mitchell Anderson as Jason Addams on After Forever (Amazon Prime Video); Kristos Andrews as Pete Garrett on The Bay: The Series (Amazon Prime Video); Brian J. White as Jimmy Blue on Bronx SIU (UMC / Amazon Prime Video); Wayne Wilcox as Ray on Only Children (Vimeo)	**Vanessa Baden Kelly as Journee on Giants (YouTube)**; Jade Harlow as Lianna Ramos on The Bay: The Series (Amazon Prime Video); Liana Liberato as McKenna Brady on Light as a Feather (Hulu); Shanti Lowry as Yolanda Rodriguez on Bronx SIU (UMC / Amazon Prime Video); Liz Vassey as Dr. Gillian Hunt on Riley Parra (tello Films)
Outstanding Performance by a Supporting Actor in a Digital Drama Series	Outstanding Performance by a Supporting Actress in a Digital Drama Series
**Terrence Terrell as Kwasi Asamoah on Giants (YouTube)**; Ameer Baraka as Darius on Bronx SIU (UMC / Amazon Prime Video); Brandon Beemer as Evan Blackwell on The Bay: The Series (Amazon Prime Video); Wil Lash as Scott Taylor on Anacostia (YouTube); Sean Samuels as Ade on Giants (YouTube)	**Erin Cherry as Brenda on After Forever (Amazon Prime Video)**; Crystal Lee Brown as Tamera on Giants (YouTube); Cady Huffman as Lisa on After Forever (Amazon Prime Video); Carolyn Ratteray as Caitlin Priest on Riley Parra (tello Films); Brianne Tju as Alex Portnoy on Light as a Feather (Hulu)
Outstanding Guest Performer in a Digital Drama Series	Outstanding Performer in a Children's, Family Viewing or Special Class Program
**Sean Patrick Flanery as Ty Garrett on The Bay: The Series (Amazon Prime Video)**; Anita Gillette as Frannie on After Forever (Amazon Prime Video); Lou Diamond Phillips as Martin on Conversations in L.A. (Amazon Prime Video); J. August Richards as Andrew Prescott on Giants (YouTube); Kelsey Scott as Sadiyah Siobahn on Giants (YouTube)	**Michela Luci as Dana on Dino Dana (Amazon Prime Video)**; Bill Cobbs as Mr. Hendrickson on Dino Dana (Amazon Prime Video); Bret Green as Preston Wainwright on The Inspectors (CBS); Edward Norton as Gary the Electronics Salesman on Ask the StoryBots (Netflix); Kimberly Persona as Miss Persona on Miss Persona (YouTube); Hannah VandenBygaart as Vera on ReBoot: The Guardian Code (Netflix)
Outstanding Performer in an Animated Program	Outstanding Performer in a Preschool Animated Program
**Jay Baruchel as Hiccup on Dragons: Race to the Edge (Netflix)**; Bob Bergen as Porky Pig on Wabbit: A Looney Tunes Production (Cartoon Network); Chris Diamantopoulos as Mickey Mouse on Disney Mickey Mouse (Disney Channel); Mark Hamill as Old Jir, Caz on Kulipari: Dream Walker (Netflix); Marieve Herington as Tilly Green on Big City Greens (Disney Channel); Ruth Negga as Mother on Angela's Christmas (Netflix)	**Ben Diskin as Gonzo, Rizzo on Muppet Babies (Disney Junior)**; Eric Bauza as Fozzie Bear, Bunsen Honeydew, Mr. Statler on Muppet Babies (Disney Junior); Steve Buscemi as Saloso on Elena of Avalor (Disney Junior); Devan Cohen as Daniel Tiger on Daniel Tiger's Neighborhood (PBS); Olivia Manning as Dazzle on Butterbean's Café (Nickelodeon)
Outstanding Host for a Lifestyle, Children's or Special Class Program	Outstanding Culinary Host
**Samantha Brown – Samantha Brown's Places to Love (PBS)**; Monique Coleman – Gimme Mo (Discovery); Mo Rocca – The Henry Ford's Innovation Nation (CBS); Jeff Corwin – Ocean Treks with Jeff Corwin (Syndicated); Rob Strasberg, Treger Strasberg – Welcome Home (The CW)	**Valerie Bertinelli – Valerie's Home Cooking (Food Network)**; Giada De Laurentiis – Giada Entertains (Food Network); Molly Yeh – Girl Meets Farm (Food Network); Pati Jinich – Pati's Mexican Table (PBS); Catherine Fulvio – A Taste of Ireland: Ballyknocken Cookery School (Recipe TV)
Outstanding Daytime Talent in a Spanish Language Program
**Alejandra Oraa, host – Destinos (CNN en Español)**; Guillermo Arduino, anchor – Encuentro (CNN en Español); Elizabeth Hernandez Curiel, correspondent – El Gordo y la Flaca (Univision); Raúl De Molina, co-host – El Gordo y la Flaca (Univision); Gabriela Natale, host – SuperLatina with Gaby Natale (VME TV)

=== Animation ===
Outstanding Individual Achievement in Animation
- **Crow: The Legend – Kal Athannassov, Character Designer (Baobab Studios)**
- **Rapunzel's Tangled Adventure – Alan Bodner, Production Designer (Disney Channel)**
- **Crow: The Legend – Cody Gramstad, Production Designer (Baobab Studios)**
- **Tumble Leaf – Yizhou Li, Character Animator (Amazon Prime Video)**
- **Rapunzel's Tangled Adventure – Brian Woods, Background Designer (Disney Channel)**
- **Spirit Riding Free – Kevin Wotton, Storyboard Artist (Netflix)**

=== Art Direction ===
Outstanding Art Direction/Set Decoration/Scenic Design for a Drama Series	Outstanding Art Direction/Set Decoration/Scenic Design
**The Young and the Restless – David Hoffmann, Jennifer Savala, Fred Cooper, Jennifer Haybach, Justine Mercado, Raquel Tarbet (CBS)**; Days of Our Lives – Dan Olexiewicz, Tom Early, Danielle Mullen (NBC); General Hospital – Jennifer Elliott, Andrew Evashchen (ABC)	**The Talk – Jeff Hall, Matt Tognacci, Stephen Paul Fackrell (CBS)**; Dino Dana – Amanda Vernuccio, Tyler McFarland, Kevin Morra (Amazon Prime Video); The Ellen DeGeneres Show – Karen Weber, Jennifer Moller (Syndicated); Odd Squad – Ron Stefaniuk, Amanda Vernuccio, Danielle Dobbyn (PBS); Prince of Peoria – Josee Lemonnier, Lia Burton, Kelly Berry (Netflix); Tomorrow's World Today – Jarrod Campbell, George Davison, Luca Paganico, Julian Taylor (Science Channel)

=== Casting ===
Outstanding Casting for a Drama Series	Outstanding Casting for an Animated Series or Special
**Days of Our Lives – Marnie Saitta, Bob Lambert (NBC)**; General Hospital – Mark Teschner, Lisa Booth, Regina Bunye (ABC); The Young and the Restless – Sheila Guthrie, Greg Salmon (CBS)	**Elena of Avalor – Jennifer Trujillo, David H. Wright III (Disney Junior)**; DuckTales – Aaron Drown, Julia Pleasants (Disney Channel); Esme & Roy – Sherry Dayton, Michael Walters (HBO); Muppet Babies – Jennifer Trujillo (Disney Junior); Rapunzel's Tangled Adventure – Julia Pleasants (Disney Channel); She-Ra and the Princesses of Power – Ania O'Hare, Cymbre Walk Sklar (Netflix)

=== Cinematography ===
Outstanding Cinematography
- **Tumble Leaf – Jeffrey Gardner (Amazon Prime Video)**
  - The Gymkhana Files – Luca Del Puppo, Pierre Wikberg, Devon Catucci, Matt Johnston, Bryan Moore, Will Roegge (Amazon Prime Video)
  - Jack Hanna's into the Wild – Erik Hardesty, Nick Righi (Syndicated)
  - Mech-X4 – Neil Cervin, Glen Dickson, Jesse Regimbal (Disney XD)
  - The New Legends of Monkey – DJ Stipsen (Netflix)

=== Costume Design ===
Outstanding Costume Design for a Drama Series	Outstanding Costume Design/Styling
**The Young and the Restless – Scott Burkhart, Elif Inanc, Craig Aspden, Theresa Broadnax, Juliet Huerta, Tony Lorito, Andreea Moldovan, Kay Wataguchi (CBS)**; Days of Our Lives – Richard Bloore, Jaime Harris, Jennifer Seery (NBC); General Hospital – Shawn Reeves, Juliana Bolles Morrison, Maki Chauhuri, William Hoffman, Nicole Nagy, Nichole Nelson, Christine Shahverdian, Alice Volonino (ABC); The Bold and the Beautiful – Glenda Maddox, Renee Vance Brunson, Gail Mosley, Jennifer Johns, Jeresa Featherstone, Ross Fuentes, Angelo Santos (CBS)	**The New Legends of Monkey – Liz McGregor (Netflix)**; Odd Squad – Christine Toye (PBS); Sesame Street – Brian C. Hemesath, Jennifer Caprio, Jason Weber, Rollie Krewson, Constance Peterson, Kate Rusek, Liz Hara, Lara MacLean, Michelle Hickey, Sierra Schoening, Ben Durocher, Tyler Hall, Ann Marie Holdgruen, Sarah Lafferty (HBO); The Talk – Cara Giannini, Tiffany Colicelli, Natalie Foroutan, Kristen Greven, Julie Keller-Meinhart, Natthaporn Patana (CBS); The Who Was? Show – Jeanie Cheek (Netflix)

=== Directing ===
Outstanding Directing for a Digital Drama Series	Outstanding Directing for a Children's, Preschool Children's or Family Viewing Program
**After Forever – Jennifer Pepperman (Amazon Prime Video)**; The Bay: The Series – Gregori J. Martin (Amazon Prime Video); Conversations in L.A. – Anne Marie Cummings (Amazon Prime Video); Giants – Xavier Burgin, Takara Joseph, J. August Richards, Carey Williams (YouTube); Light as a Feather – Alexis Ostrander (Hulu)	**Odd Squad: World Turned Odd – J.J. Johnson (PBS)**; Dino Dana – J.J. Johnson (Amazon Prime Video); Free Rein – Dusan Lazarevic, Declan O'Dwyer, Angelo Abela (Netflix); Mech-X4 – Jem Garrard, Zack Lipovsky, Eric Dean Seaton, Adam Stein (DisneyXD); Odd Squad – J.J. Johnson, Melanie Orr, Stefan Scaini (PBS)
Outstanding Directing for a Preschool Animated Program	Outstanding Directing for an Animated Program
**Ask the StoryBots – Jeff Gill, Evan Spiridellis, Jacob Streilein (Netflix)**; Fancy Nancy – Mircea Mantta, Jamie Mitchell (Disney Junior); Nella the Princess Knight – Gili Dolev, William Gordon, Ed Lewis (Nickelodeon); Peg + Cat – Jennifer Oxley, Brett Hall, Robert Powers, Cory Bobiak, Christopher Jammal, Susan Hart, Steven Rebollido (PBS); Tumble Leaf – Drew Hodges, Michael Granberry (Amazon Prime Video)	**Crow: The Legend – Eric Darnell (Baobab Studios)**; The Adventures of Rocky and Bullwinkle – Greg Miller, Howie Perry, Kristi Reed, Chuck Sheetz (Amazon Prime Video); Hilda – Andy Coyle, Megan Ferguson (Netflix); Tales of Arcadia: Trollhunters – Rodrigo Blaas, Elaine Bogan, Guillermo del Toro, Johane Matte, Andrew Schmidt (Netflix); Watership Down – Noam Murro, Seamus Malone, Alan Short (Netflix)
Outstanding Directing for a Single Camera Lifestyle, Culinary, Travel or Educational and Informational Program	Outstanding Directing for a Multiple Camera Lifestyle/Culinary or Educational and Informational Program
**1st Look – Brian Mait (NBC)**; Joseph Rosendo's Travelscope – Joseph Rosendo (PBS); The Pioneer Woman – Olivia Ball (Food Network); Samantha Brown's Places to Love – Sylvia Caminer (PBS); Weird but True! – Brandon Gulish (National Geographic Kids)	**Milk Street – Jan Maliszewski (PBS)**; America's Test Kitchen – Herb Sevush (PBS); Cook's Country – Herb Sevush (PBS); Home & Family – Miguel Enciso, Jonathan Jackson, Jeff Rifkin (Hallmark Channel); The Kitchen – Adriane Adler (Food Network)
Outstanding Directing for a Talk Show, Entertainment News or Morning Program	Outstanding Directing for a Game Show
**The Ellen DeGeneres Show – Liz Patrick, Ken Cooper, Huck Hackstedt (Syndicated)**; A Little Help with Carol Burnett – Sandra Restrepo Considine (Netflix); The Real – Ashley Gorman (Syndicated); The Talk – Joe Carolei, Jill Dove, Carlos Moreno, Ann Rogerson (CBS); The View – Sarah De La O, Dawn Di Cicco, Janean Elkins, John Keegan (ABC)	**Family Feud – Ken Fuchs (Syndicated)**; Jeopardy! – Clay Jacobsen, Kevin McCarthy (Syndicated); Let's Make a Deal – Lenn Goodside (CBS); The Price Is Right – Adam Sandler (CBS); Who Wants to Be a Millionaire – Ron de Moraes (Syndicated)
Outstanding Directing Special Class
**Time for Ilhan – Norah Shapiro (Fuse)**; The Gymkhana Files – Gil Marsden, Brian Scotto (Amazon Prime Video); Team United – Behind the Scenes: Superheroes – Nicolas DeGrazia (United Airlines / YouTube); Watchtower – Noel Braham (Vimeo); Working in the Theatre – Margarita Jimeno (AmericanThreatreWing.org)

=== Editing ===
Outstanding Multiple Camera Editing for a Drama Series	Outstanding Single Camera Editing
**General Hospital – Peter Fillmore, Teresa Cicala, Steven Gonzalez, Steven Kuns, Marika Kushel, Allison Reames Smith (ABC)**; Days of Our Lives – Lugh Powers, Kevin Church, Michael Fiamingo, Joseph Lumer, Jenee Muyeau (NBC); The Young and the Restless – Derek Berlatsky, Kimberly Everett, Rafael Gertel, Andrew Hachem, Sean Isom (CBS)	**Eat. Race. Win – Giacomo Ambrosini, RJ Bain, Renee Barron, Michael Brown, Carol Carimi Acutt, Devrim Wellman (Amazon Prime Video)**; 1st Look – Brian Mait (NBC); Giada On the Beach – Ryan Moore, Jeff Warren (Food Network); The Henry Ford's Innovation Nation – C. Andrew Hall (CBS); The Who Was? Show – Craig Cobb, Nathan Patrick Floody (Netflix)
Outstanding Multiple Camera Editing
**Sesame Street – Todd E. James, Memo Salazar, Ed Kulzer, Chris Reinhart, Jordan Santora (HBO)**; Disney Parks Magical Christmas Day Parade – John M. Cox, Bill DeRonde, Brad Gilson, Guy Harding, Mike Polito, Tim Schultz (ABC); Let's Make a Deal – Dustin Belanger, Marc Gaudioso, Matt Moran, Will Smith (CBS); The Price Is Right – Frankie Le Nguyen, Jennifer Fah-Vayhinger, La-Aja J. Hernandez, Nicole M. Katz, Stephanie Le Abbott, Doug Schnieder, Matthew Lannin (CBS); Top Chef Junior – Brian Giberson, Christine Khalafian, Jose Rodriguez, Jay M. Rogers, Justin Valentine (Universal Kids)

=== Hairstyling ===
Outstanding Hairstyling for a Drama Series	Outstanding Hairstyling
**The Young and the Restless – Vanessa Bragdon, Adrianna Lucio, Lauren Mendoza, Regina Rodriguez, Dorchelle Stafford, Jackie Zavala (CBS)**; Days of Our Lives – Armando Licon, Marisa Ramirez, Nicky Schillace, Georgette Sweet (NBC); The Bold and the Beautiful – Lisa Long, Danielle Dixon, Lauren Larsen, Melanie Saunders, Danielle Spencer (CBS)	**The Talk – Vickie Mynes, Lucianna Pezzolo, Angela Stevens, Nicole Walpert (CBS)**; Free Rein – Adele Firth, Amy Boyd, Jennie Horsfall (Netflix); Live with Kelly and Ryan – Diane D'Agostino (Syndicated); The Real – Roberta Gardner-Rogers, Ray Dodson, Noogie Thai Rachel Mason (Syndicated); The View – Rosa Amoedo, Derick Monroe, Dora Smagler (ABC)

=== Lighting Direction ===
Outstanding Lighting Direction for a Drama Series	Outstanding Lighting Direction
**The Young and the Restless – William Roberts, Ray Thompson (CBS)**; Days of Our Lives – Mark Levin, Ted Polmanski (NBC); General Hospital – Bob Bessoir, Melanie Mohr, Vincent Steib (ABC)	**The Inspectors – Sherri Kauk, Matthew Lipton (CBS)**; Dino Dana – George Lajtai (Amazon Prime Video); The Ellen DeGeneres Show – Tom Beck, Kevin Cauley, Brian Freidin (Syndicated); Rachael Ray – Alan Blacher, Mitchell Bogard (Syndicated); The Talk – Marisa Davis, Kelly Waldman (CBS)

=== Main Title Design ===
Outstanding Main Title and Graphic Design for a Live-Action Program	Outstanding Main Title and Graphic Design for an Animated Program
**Six Dreams – Kote Berberecho, Jordi Rins (Amazon Prime Video)**; DailyMailTV – Carla Pennington, Jeffrey Wilson, John Perry, Brian Johnson, Jake Infusino, Raj Soni, Jeremy Samples, Bijan Yeganegi, Eric Anthony, Paul Broz, Zac Grant, Gustavo Larrazabal, Susie Carter (Syndicated); Disney Parks Magical Christmas Day Parade – Ben Hall, Paul Tigwell, Clive Llewellyn, Tom Lee, Alex Briggs (ABC); Prince of Peoria – Ken Carlson, Sean Owolo, Crystal Deones, Ana Lossada, Dennis Shen, Barry Chesser (Netflix); The Who Was? Show – Scott Greenberg, Joel Kuwahara, Jason Stiff, Craig Hartin, Jason Shwartz, Billie Liao, Caitlin Lehman, Marty Walker, Betty Liao, Edward Rowan, Joshua Mullinax (Netflix)	**Hilda – Andy Coyle, Megan Ferguson, Luke Pearson, Rob Buchanan, Melissa Courville, Chloe Couture, Todd Faux, Matt Friesen, Emily Hann, Stephen Harding, Megan Harries, Michelle Labonte, David Laliberte, Diane Lepage, Ross Love, Jessie Moore, Amanda Myre, Terry O'Reilly, Shawn Pyke, Matt Said, Allen Tam, Collin Tsandilis, Kyle Vermette, Alex Wang (Netflix)**; The Adventures of Rocky and Bullwinkle – Chris Mitchell, Stéphane Coëdel, Jesse Willson, Ricky Laity, Toan Nguyen, Debora Slikta de Sousa (Amazon Prime Video); Little Big Awesome – Elliot Lim (Amazon Prime Video); Tales of Arcadia: 3Below – Rodrigo Blaas, Michael Smukavic, Alfonso Blaas, Brandon Tyra, Greg Lev, Igor Lodeiro, John Laus (Netflix); Watership Down – Jason Groves, Chris Harding, Richard Kenworthy (Netflix)

=== Makeup ===
Outstanding Makeup for a Drama Series	Outstanding Makeup
**Days of Our Lives – Nick Schillace, Elizabeth Dahl, Karen Dahl, Deidre Decker (NBC)**; General Hospital – Donna Messina, Angela Ackley, Louisa Adzhiyan, Samantha Barrows, Sasha Camacho Van Dyke, Caitlin Davison, Bobbie Roberts, Vincent Van Dyke (ABC); The Young and the Restless – Patti Denney, Robert Bolger, Kelsey Collins, Kathy Jones, Marlene Mason, Laura Schaffer (CBS); The Bold and the Beautiful – Christine Lai Johnson, Chris Escobosa, Jennifer Wittman, Vanessa Dionne, Stacey Alfano (CBS)	**The Talk – Jude Alcala, Ernesto Casillas, Michelle Daurio, Dell McDonald, Ann-Marie Oliver, Gabbi Pascua (CBS)**; Aliens Ate My Homework – Todd Masters, Jon Berezan, Caitlin Groves, Jennifer Latour, Sarah Pickersgill, Samantha Burke, Chris Devitt, Mariana Fernandez, Clarissa Jorquera, Yukiyo Okakjima, Charles Porlier, Brad Proctor, Joshua Raymond, Lori Sandnes, Jeannine Satterthwaite, James Skuse, Tomasz Sosnowski, Kyla Tremblay (Netflix); The Price Is Right – Carol Wood (CBS); The View – Rebecca Borman, Lynette Broom, Karen Dupiche (ABC); Walk the Prank – Jennifer Aspinall, Ned Niedhart (Disney Channel)

=== Music ===
Outstanding Music Direction and Composition for a Drama Series	Outstanding Music Direction and Composition
**Days of Our Lives – Paul Antonelli, Steve Reinhardt, Ken Corday, D. Brent Nelson (NBC)**; General Hospital – Paul Glass, Dave MacLeod, Kevin Bents, Kurt Biederwolf, Steven Hopkins, Matt McGuire, David Norland, Bobby Summerfield (ABC); The Young and the Restless – RC Cates, Mike Dobson, Brad Hatfield, Rick Krizman, Gary Kuo, Gaye Tolan Hatfield (CBS)	**The Tom and Jerry Show – Vivek Maddala, Steve Morell, John Van Tongeren (Cartoon Network)**; Disney Mickey Mouse – Christopher Willis (Disney Channel); Elena of Avalor – Tony Morales (Disney Junior); The Loud House – Doug Rockwell, Michelle Lewis (Nickelodeon); Watership Down – Federico Jusid, Iain Cooke (Netflix)
Outstanding Original Song	Outstanding Original Song for a Children's, Young Adult or Animated Program
**The Bold and the Beautiful – "You're the One" by Bradley P. Bell, Anthony Ferrari, Casey Kasprzyk, Matt Pavolitis (CBS)**; Days of Our Lives – "Goodbye" by Genesee Nelson (NBC); Giants – "Beat of Your Heart" by Drew Anthuny (YouTube); Giants – "More Love" by Brandon Brown, Ashly Williams, Kareem James (YouTube); 92nd Annual Macy's Thanksgiving Day Parade – "We Believe" by Wesley Whatley (NBC); The Young and the Restless – "How Could a Lie Feel So True" by RC Cates, Cait Baunoch, Sara Bibel, Mal Young (CBS)	**Peg + Cat – "Making a World With My Friend" by D.D. Jackson, Billy Aronson (PBS)**; Sofia the First – "For One and All" by John Kavanaugh, Craig Gerber (Disney Junior); Elena of Avalor – "Fallin' Like a Rock" by John Kavanaugh, Craig Gerber, Silvia Olivas, Kerri Grant (Disney Junior); Peg + Cat – "The Thrill of Invention" by J. Walter Hawkes, Billy Aronson (PBS); Peg + Cat – "You're All Number One Tonight!" by Larry Hochman, Kevin Del Aguila (PBS)
Outstanding Musical Performance in a Daytime Program
**Today Show – "Answer Me" by the Cast of The Band's Visit (Katrina Lenk, Tony Shalhoub, John Cariani, Ari'el Stachel, George Abud, Etai Benson, Adam Kantor, Andrew Polk, Bill Army, Rachel Prather, Jonathan Raviv, Sharone Sayegh, Kristen Sieh, Alok Tewari, Ossama Farouk, Sam Sadigursky, Harvey Valdes, Garo Yellin) (NBC)**; CBS This Morning Saturday – "Girl Goin' Nowhere / American Scandal" by Ashley McBryde (CBS); Live With Kelly and Ryan – "Dance of the Sugar Plum Fairy" by Lindsey Stirling (Syndicated); Pickler & Ben – "Old Friends" by Ben Rector (Syndicated); The Real – "Secrets" by Adrienne Houghton, Israel Houghton (Syndicated)

=== Technical Direction ===
Outstanding Technical Team for a Drama Series	Outstanding Technical Team
**The Bold and the Beautiful – Gary Chamberlin, Ted L Morales, John Carlson, Dean LaMont, Nico Svoboda, Roberto Bosio, Scha Jani, George Forbes (CBS)**; General Hospital – Chuck Abate, Kevin Carr, Craig Camou, Dale Carlson, Dean Cosanella, Barbara Langdon, Antonio Simone (ABC); The Young and the Restless – Tracy Lawrence, John Bromberek, Luis Godinez Jr., Kai Kim, William Looper, Roberto Bosio, Scha Jani (CBS)	**The Price Is Right – Glenn Koch, Wayne Getchell, Edward Nelson, Brent Roberts, Bob Smith, Fernando Thomas, Rick Labgold (CBS)**; American Ninja Warrior Junior – Joe Hindin, Warren Chong, Matt Furman, Steve Hollis, Tim Baker, John Armstrong, Jay Mack Arnette, Rob Cammidge, Brian Connolly, Megan Drew, Michael Ryan Fletchall, Brian Freesh, Brian Gaetke, Jeff Hamby, Austin Rock, Rodrigo Rodrigues, Bry Sanders, Maximilian Schmige, Jeremiah Smith, Danny Whiteneck, Brenda Zuniga, Alan Pineda (Universal Kids); CBS This Morning – Fountain Jones, Louis Fernandez, Mark Haffner, Al Schatz, Gary Schaub, Maximilian Avans, Joe Basile, John Curtin, Jared Hanna, Anthony Planes, Andy Robinson, Michael Schmehl, Claus Stuhlweissenburg, Lee Warden (CBS); The Ellen DeGeneres Show – Zach Greenbergm, Forrest Fraser, Donovan Gilbuena, Timothy O'Neill, David Rhea, David Weeks, Paul Wileman, Jimmy Moran (Syndicated); Jeopardy! – Lucinda Owens Margolis, Marc Hunter, L. David Irete, Ray Reynolds, Mike Tribble, Gary Taillon (Syndicated); Sesame Street – Tom Guadarrama, Frank Biondo, Mark Britt, Jerry Cancel, Shaun Harkins, Mark Renaudin, Jim Meek (HBO)

=== Sound ===
Outstanding Live and Direct to Tape Sound Mixing for a Drama Series	Outstanding Live and Direct to Tape Sound Mixing
**The Young and the Restless – Andrzej Warzocha, Dean Johnson, Ricky Alvarez, Joseph Lawrence, Thomas Luth, Mark Mooney, Nico Svoboda, Marisa Garcia, Denise Palm Stones (CBS)**; The Bold and the Beautiful – J. Aaron Lepley, Tommy Persson, Brian Connell, Jerry Martz, Daniel Lecuna, Justin Lamont, Nick Krotov, Giovanni Meza, Julian Salas (CBS); General Hospital – Christopher Baninger, Donald Smith, Paul Glass, Dave MacLeod, Thomas Byrne, Alan Zema (ABC)	**The Ellen DeGeneres Show – Terry Fountain, Liz Cabral, Phil Gebhardt, Chuck Orozco, Dirk Sciarrotta (Syndicated)**; Family Feud – Jeffrey Frickman, Dirk Sciarrotta, Lance Gardhouse, Liza Tan, Jennifer Vannoy-Rounsaville, Joey Adelman, Philip Gebhardt, John Protzko (Syndicated); Let's Make a Deal – John Protzko, Dustin Belanger, Marc Gaudioso, Cat Gray, Rory Ambron, Mike Mazzetti (CBS); The Price Is Right – Henry Muehlhausen, Robbi Sutherland, Jennifer Fah Vayhinger, La-Aja Hernandez, Nicole Katz, Matthew Lannin, Stephanie Le Abbott, Frankie Le Nguyen, Doug Schneider, Nancy Perry, Brian Rushing, Joshua Gardener (CBS); Steve – Eddie Marquez, James Slanger, Danny Cruz, Jennifer Vannoy-Rounsaville (Syndicated)
Outstanding Sound Mixing	Outstanding Sound Mixing for an Animated Program
**Sesame Street – Chris Prinzivalli, Michael Barrett, Michael Croiter, Dick Maitland (HBO)**; The Gymkhana Files – Rian Balvin, Preston Edmondson (Amazon Prime Video); The New Legends of Monkey – Richard Flynn, Ian McLoughlin, Evan McHugh (Netflix); ReBoot: The Guardian Code – Millar Montgomery, Kirby Jinnah (Netflix); Six Dreams – Laro Basterrechea (Amazon Prime Video)	**Tales of Arcadia: 3Below – Carlos Sanches, Aran Tanchum (Netflix)**; Angela's Christmas – Steven Maher (Netflix); Crow: The Legend – Scot Stafford, Pete Horner, Jamey Scott (Baobab Studios); Tales of Arcadia: Trollhunters – Carlos Sanches (Netflix); Watership Down – Dominic Gibbs, Martin Roller, Mark Taylor, Jose Vinader (Netflix)
Outstanding Sound Mixing for a Preschool Animated Program	Outstanding Sound Editing for a Live Action Program
**Beat Bugs – Sam Gain-Emery, Sam Hayward, Thom Kellar, Daniel Denholm, Sean Carey, Brent Clark, Wes Swales, Bob Mothersbaugh (Netflix)**; PAW Patrol: "Mighty Pups" – Richard Spence-Thomas (Nickelodeon); Rusty Rivets – Chris Harris, Mary Lee (Nickelodeon); The Stinky & Dirty Show – Steve Maher, Eric Lewis (Amazon Prime Video); Vampirina – Otis Van Osten, Jay Culliton, Carlos Sanches, Eric Lewis (Disney Junior)	**The Who Was? Show – Jay Fisher (Netflix)**; Dino Dana – Sean W. Karp, Charles Duchesne, Will Preventis, Noah Siegel, Blag Ahilov, Jakob Thiesen (Amazon Prime Video); The New Legends of Monkey – Luke Mynott, Wes Chew, Julian Wessels, Cihan Saral, Tom Herdman, Dylan Barfield, Melanie Graham, Damian Chan, Joshua James Smith (Netflix); Sesame Street – Michael Croiter, Chris Prinzivalli, Michael Barrett, Chris Sassano, Dick Maitland, Jorge Muelle, Paul Rudolph (HBO); Six Dreams – Laro Basterrechea (Amazon Prime Video)
Outstanding Sound Editing for an Animated Program	Outstanding Sound Editing for a Preschool Animated Program
**Lego DC Super Heroes: The Flash! – Devon Bowman, Rob McIntyre, Evan R. Dockter, Andrew Ing, Lawrence Reyes, Marc Schmidt, Ezra Walker, Mark A. Keatts, David M. Cowan, Kelly Foley Downs, Patrick Foley, Mike Garcia, Tim Kelly, George Peters, Aran Tanchum, Vincent Guisetti (Digital Release)**; Big Hero 6: The Series – Robert Poole II, Robbi Smith, David Bonilla, Rich Danhakl, J Lampinen (Disney Channel); Tales of Arcadia: Trollhunters – Matt Hall, Otis Van Osten, Jason Oliver, Vincent Guisetti (Netflix); Tales of Arcadia: 3Below – Otis Van Osten, James Miller, Jason Oliver, Vincent Guisetti (Netflix); Watership Down – Dominic Gibbs, Luke Gentry, Lilly Blazewicz, Eilam Hoffman, George Lee, Adam Horley, Andrew Walton, Arabella Winter, Glen Gathard, Jemma Riley-Tolch, Pete Burgis, Zoe Freed, Rebecca Heathcote (Netflix)	**Vampirina – Otis Van Osten, Marcos Abrom, Jason Oliver, Eric Lewis, Goeun Lee (Disney Junior)**; Beat Bugs – Sam Hayward, Jared Dwyer, Andrew Miller, Thalia Coletis, Sean Carey, Jason Fernandez, Blair Slater (Netflix); Elena of Avalor – Robert Poole II, Robbi Smith, David Bonilla, J. Lampinen, Chris Coyne, Rich Danhakl (Disney Junior); Let's Go Luna! – Mike Mancuso, Joe Tetreau, Ryan Eligh, Dante Winkler, Matt Mckenzie (PBS Kids); The Stinky & Dirty Show – Steve Maher, Simon Bird, Peter Blayney, Jake Monaco, Eric Lewis (Amazon Prime Video)

=== Writing ===
Outstanding Writing Team for a Digital Drama Series	Outstanding Writing for a Children's, Preschool Children's, Family Viewing
**After Forever – Michael Slade, Kevin Spirtas (Amazon Prime Video)**; The Bay: The Series – Gregori J. Martin (Amazon Prime Video); Conversations in L.A. – Anne Marie Cummings (Amazon Prime Video); Giants – James Bland, Vanessa Baden Kelly, Christina Martin, J. August Richards (YouTube); Light as a Feather – R. Lee Fleming Jr. (Hulu)	**Odd Squad – Tim McKeon, Mark De Angelis, Adam Peltzman, Robby Hoffman (PBS)**; Dino Dana – J.J. Johnson, Christin Simms, Nathalie Younglai (Amazon Prime Video); Odd Squad: World Turned Odd – Tim McKeon, Mark De Angelis, Adam Peltzman, Robby Hoffman (PBS); Sesame Street – Ken Scarborough, Molly Boylan, Jessica Carleton, Geri Cole, Joe Fallon, Christine Ferraro, Elizabeth Hara, Ron Holsey, Raye Lankford, Luis Santeiro, Belinda Ward (HBO); The Who Was? Show – Brian Clark, Eric Gilliland, Elliott Kalan, Mark McAdam, Brian McCann, Delaney Yeager (Netflix)
Outstanding Writing for a Preschool Animated Program	Outstanding Writing Team for an Animated Program
**Ask the StoryBots – Jeff Gill, Evan Spiridellis, Gregg Spiridellis, Jacob Streilein, Nate Theis, Eddie West (Netflix)**; Daniel Tiger's Neighborhood – Becky Friedman, Angela Santomero, Alexandra Cassel, Jennifer Hamburg, Melinda LaRose, Jill Cozza-Turner (PBS); Disney Doc McStuffins Christmas Special – Chris Nee, Randi Barnes, Kerri Grant, Michael Stern (Disney Junior); Fancy Nancy – Krista Tucker, Matt Hoverman, Laurie Israel, Andy Guerdat (Disney Junior); Peg + Cat – Billy Aronson, Kevin Del Aguila (PBS)	**The Loud House – Sammie Crowley, Karla Sakas Shropshire, Sheela Shrinivas, Kevin Sullivan, Whitney Wetta, Mike Rubiner (Nickelodeon)**; Angela's Christmas – Will Collins, Damien O'Connor (Netflix); Hilda – Stephanie Simpson, Kenny Byerly (Netflix); Tales of Arcadia: Trollhunters – Marc Guggenheim, Dan Hageman, Kevin Hageman, AC Bradley, Chad Quandt, Lila Scott, Aaron Waltke (Netflix); Wild Kratts – Chris Kratt, Martin Kratt (PBS)
Outstanding Writing Special Class
**The Ellen DeGeneres Show – Jason Gelles, Kevin A. Leman II, Lauren Pomerantz, Alison Balian, Jason Blackman, Jamie Brunton, Ellen DeGeneres, Bente Engelstoft, Rick Mitchell, Gil Rief, Troy Thomas, Michael Tiberi, Adam Yenser (Syndicated)**; The Henry Ford's Innovation Nation – Jim Lichtenstein, Stephanie Himango, John Murphy, Norma Rubio, Alie Ward (CBS); The Royal Wedding Live with Cord and Tish! – Will Ferrell, Andrew Steele, Jake Fogelnest, Jocelyn Richard (HBO); To Life: How Israeli Volunteers Are Changing the World – Erin Zimmerman (Freeform); The 2018 Rose Parade Hosted by Cord & Tish – Will Ferrell, Jake Fogelnest, Andrew Steele (Amazon Prime Video)
