= Anne Marie Cummings =

First Emmy nominee for acting, writing, and directing in a digital dramatic TV series

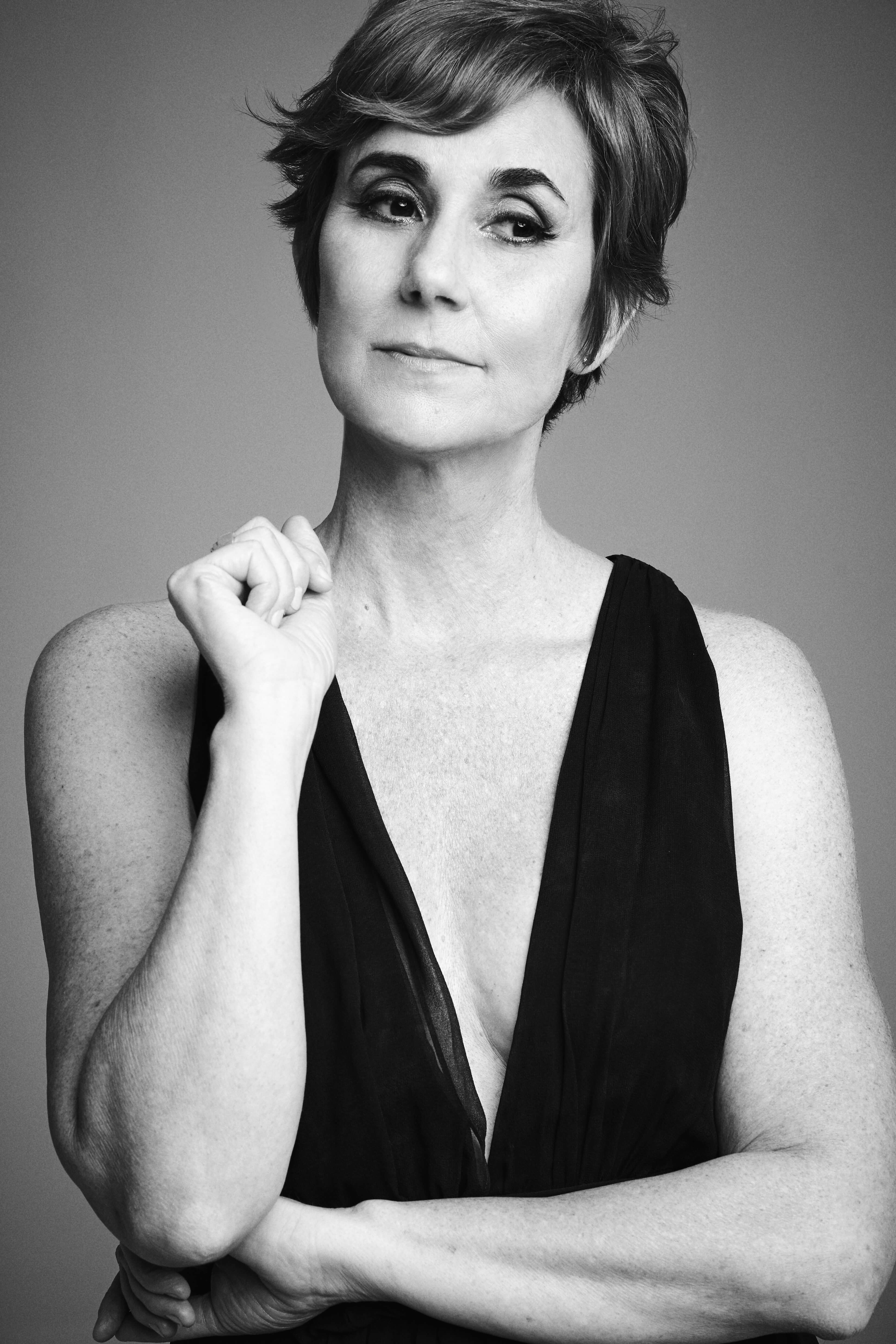
- Cummings 2020
- Born: Anne Marie Cummings; December 7, 1967 (age 58)
- Education: Carnegie Mellon University; Northwestern University; British American Drama Academy
- Occupations: Actress, writer, director, producer
- Website: Anne Marie Cummings – Official Website

Anne Marie Cummings is the first woman to receive Emmy nominations in the categories of acting, writing, and directing in a digital dramatic television series.

In 2015, Cummings moved to Los Angeles after spending 30 years in the theatre as a professional actress, playwright, director, and then artistic director of her own theatre company in Upstate New York. In its final year, Cummings moved her theatre company from a black box theatre into an independent movie theatre. It was during this time that she began to film her own plays in a simplistic, one-shot format.

Cummings recognized she was merging her experiences from the theatre onto film, so she moved to Los Angeles to continue to explore her style within the one-shot format. This quickly advanced into highly choreographed, 360 one-shot camera work for three seasons of the television series she created, wrote, and directed about an older woman and a much younger man called, "Conversations in L.A.” “Conversations in L.A.” released on Amazon Prime, iTunes, and ConversationsinLA.com from 2017-2019. In October, 2019, FandangoNOW picked up the series and released it on their platform.

== Artistic career ==
Cummings grew up in Fort Lauderdale, Florida, and began acting on stage at the age of six. After performing in multiple professional plays, by the age of 16 she attended the conservatory drama program at Carnegie Mellon University. During her summer years while at Carnegie, she continued to study acting at Northwestern University and the British American Drama Academy in Oxford, England (BADA). At BADA, she attended lectures with Simon Callow, Jeremy Irons, Peggy Ashcroft and John Gielgud. At Northwestern, she studied Anton Chekhov’s plays with the master of Chekhov - the late Earle R. Gister.

Following her dramatic education, Cummings performed in regional theatres around the United States. It began when Peter Sylvester cast her in the role of Irina in “The Three Sisters,” by Anton Chekhov, at Synchronicity Space in New York City. Subsequently, she worked at the Alley Theatre in Houston, Texas, with director Gregory Boyd (“A Flea in Her Ear,” by Georges Feydeau), and with directors and writers Anne Bogart and Tina Landau (“American Vaudeville”). She then performed the role of Constanza in “Amadeus,” by Peter Schaffer which was directed by Mark Ramont at the Capital City Playhouse in Austin, Texas. And she enjoyed taking on the character of Puck in “A Midsummer Night’s Dream,’ directed by Anne Ciccolella at the Austin Shakespeare Festival.

Anne Marie traveled to Seattle and created her first theatre company, The Immediate Theatre. She teamed with theatre and opera director, Chuck Hudson, who directed her in the role of Gregor in an avant-garde production of “The Metamorphosis,” by Franz Kafka, and as Marie in “Woyzeck,” by Georg Büchner. Cummings enjoyed experimenting in the theatre and collaborated with Benji Bittle who directed her in the role of Taylor (as a woman) from the play “K2,” by Patrick Meyers. For this production, a dance studio was turned into a mountain created by scaffolds, designed by Andrew Davidhazy, and Cummings (a method actress), trained for this role by summiting the 14,000 foot Mt. Rainier.

Anne Marie also performed with established companies in the Seattle area: AHA! Theatre, Alice B. Theatre, the Seattle Shakespeare Company, the Seattle Children’s Theatre, the Seattle Opera, and the Seattle Repertory Theatre where she worked with Tony Award-Winning director, Doug Hughes. Hughes directed Cummings in the black box and mainstage productions of “Voir Dire,” by Joe Sutton, as well as a reading of the play at the New York Theatre Workshop in Manhattan.

A year later, Mark Cuddy cast and directed Cummings as Rosaura in “Life is a Dream,” by Pedro Calderon de la Barca at the Sacramento Theatre Company which inspired Edward Payson Call to cast Anne Marie as Antigone, in the Jean Anouilh version of “Antigone” at the Cleveland Playhouse and GeVa Theatre in Upstate New York. But it was at this point that Cummings moved back to New York City and shifted her focus from acting to playwriting and directing with performance readings of her plays “Helen of Purgatory,” “Touche!,” and “Extremes.” While Cummings directed most of the readings of her plays, she also worked with theatre directors Ludovica Villar-Hauser and Lucie Tiberghien. Performance readings of her work took place all across the city at the Culture Project, the Cherry Lane, Classic Stage Company, Vineyard Theatre, and SALAAM Theatre. The performance readings of her play “India Dreaming,” were directed by Leigh Fondakowski (“The Laramie Project”) and starred Indian movie stars, Madhur Jaffrey (“Vanya on 42nd Street”) followed by Lillete Dubey (“Monsoon Wedding” and “The Best Exotic Marigold Hotel”). With further development, “India Dreaming” became “India Awaiting” and was performed Off-Broadway at the Samuel Beckett Theatre and starred Maulik Pancholy (“30 Rock” and “Weeds”), and directed by Tyler Marchant. Following the limited run of “India Awaiting,” Cummings moved to Ithaca, in Upstate New York, to focus more intensely on her writing and directing.

To make a living, Cummings worked as a columnist and journalist. As a columnist, she created the controversial piece, “Instant Message” (for Gannett publications). This column interviewed youth and was written in first person as monologues about teenagers' personal issues from eating disorders, family dysfunction, being bullied, relationships, school, learning, and so on. Also for Gannett, she wrote food reviews called, “Ithaca Eats,” and for Tompkins Weekly, she wrote breaking news stories, each featuring her own photography.

Yet during this time, Cummings continued writing plays. She wrote “Sinkhole” and had more performance readings of her play “Extremes” (a reading was held at Primary Stages in the Big Apple which starred Michael Cullen from the film “Dead Man Walking” and Jessica Blank from the award-winning play “The Exonerated”). She also made major revisions to “Helen of Purgatory” which then became the play “Purgatory Row” (with a performance reading starring Steppenwolf theatre actress, Kate Buddeke). Around this time, she created her second theatre company, The Readers’ Theatre of Ithaca, which started in a book store and moved into a black box theatre with performance readings of modern plays such as “Oleanna,” by David Mamet, “The Mercy Seat,” by Neil LaBute, and “Detroit,” by Lisa D’Amour.

However, it was when Anne Marie moved The Readers’ Theatre of Ithaca into Cinemapolis (the only independent movie theatre in Ithaca) that she began dabbling with theatre on film, as she called it. She wrote her play, “Soul Mates,” and filmed it in one shot at a diner. She then wrote and filmed a short called, “Easy Prey,” with each scene being filmed in one shot. For The Readers’ Theatre of Ithaca, Cummings began to film trailers for the modern plays she directed which continued to be performed on a small stage built into one of the movie theatres. But it was after one year at Cinemapolis that Cummings decided to expand and move to Los Angeles, CA, so that she could merge all of her experiences from the theatre as an actress, writer, director, artistic director, and producer, into her one-shot vision for television and film.

== Awards and nominations ==
- 2017 44th Daytime Emmy Awards
  - Outstanding Lead Actress in a Digital Daytime Drama Series – Anne Marie Cummings (Nominated)
- 2017 6th HollyWeb Festival
  - Outstanding Digital Drama Series – Conversations in L.A. – Anne Marie Cummings (Nominated)
- 2018 45th Daytime Emmy Awards
  - Outstanding Writing in a Digital Drama Series – Anne Marie Cummings (Nominated and Presenter at Emmy Award Ceremony)
- 2018 9th New Media Film Festival
  - Outstanding Trailer in a Digital Drama Series – Conversations in L.A. – Anne Marie Cummings (Nominated)
- 2019 46th Daytime Emmy Awards
  - Outstanding Writing in a Digital Daytime Drama Series – Anne Marie Cummings (Nominated and Presenter at Emmy Award Ceremony)
  - Outstanding Directing in a Digital Daytime Drama Series – Anne Marie Cummings (Nominated and Presenter at Emmy Award Ceremony)
- 2019 10th Indie Series Awards
  - BEST DIRECTING – ANNE MARIE CUMMINGS (WINNER)
  - Best Writing – Anne Marie Cummings (Nominated)
  - Best Lead Actress – Anne Marie Cummings (Nominated)
- 2019 40th Telly Awards
  - BEST SCRIPTED SERIES - ANNE MARIE CUMMINGS (BRONZE WINNER)

== Critical reception for Conversations in L.A. ==
After Season One, the Huffington Post wrote, “Anne Marie Cummings is a force and Hollywood has taken note. As Creator, Cummings dares to go there. As Writer, Cummings is brilliant. As Actress, Cummings draws the audience in with each raw, real and authentic performance. As Director, Cummings commands nothing but the best from the entire cast.” TV Grapevine wrote, "Anne Marie is the epitome of a strong powerful woman. Not only is she a triple threat (acting, directing and writing), but she is someone who stays humble and down to earth." USA Today wrote, "Anne Marie is living proof that it's never too late to chase the dream, whatever that may be." USA Today also wrote, "The finished product is...a study in the art of art." Emmy Magazine said of the show, "...beautifully choreographed." In an interview with AXS TV, Lou Diamond Phillips said of Anne Marie Cummings’ writing, "It reminded me a bit of Mamet. It reminded me a bit of Tarantino. There's just some great conversational musicality to it...incredibly well-structured and compelling from line to line." In the same interview, Lou Diamond Phillips said, "At this point in my career, after 40 years as a professional and 30 years in Hollywood, there are not many things where I can say, 'I've never done anything quite like that.'" Hollywood Alert wrote that Anne Marie Cummings, "...is the first woman to receive Emmy nominations for Digital Series Acting, Writing, and Directing." Carlos Sottomayor Magazine wrote the series is, "A funny and witty series." In an article by Stareable, it was written that, "Cummings’ theatre background is clear in their format." "“Anne Marie Cummings is phenomenal! If you’ve never heard about her - - now’s your chance! She is the first woman to receive Emmy nominations in the digital drama categories of Acting, Writing, and Directing, and all for the three seasons of her Amazon Prime digital drama series about an older woman who falls in love with a much younger man called CONVERSATIONS IN L.A.” – The Frank Magazine, UK

== Theatre, acting ==
Title	Playwright	Role	Director	Venue
Voire Dire	Joe Sutton	Faith, Lead	Doug Hughes	Seattle Repertory Theatre, Seattle, Washington
				New York Theatre Workshop, New York City, NY
In a Forest, Dark and Deep	Neil LaBute	Betty, Lead	Cynthia Henderson	The Readers' Theatre, Ithaca, NY
The Mercy Seat	Neil LaBute	Abby, Lead	Bryan Van Campen	The Readers' Theatre, Ithaca, NY
Antigone	Jean Anouih	Antigone, Lead	Edward Payson Call	GeVa Theatre, Rochester, NY
				Cleveland Playhouse, Cleveland, OH
Smash	Jeffrey Hatcher	Agatha, Lead	Victor Pappas	Intiman Theatre, Seattle, Washington (reading)
Life is a Dream	Pedro Calderon de La Barca	Rosaura, Lead	Mark Cuddy	Sacramento Theatre, Sacramento, CA
India Dreaming	Anne Marie Cummings	Janet, Lead	Leigh Fondakowski	Culture Project, New York City, NY
				Cherry Lane Theatre, New York City, NY
The Three Sisters	Anton Chekhov	Irina, Lead	Peter Sylvester	Synchronicity Space, New York City, NY
The Mandrake	Niccolo Machiavelli	Ligurio, Lead	Tim Ocel	Sacramento Theatre, Sacramento, CA
Amadeus	Peter Shaffer	Constanze, Lead	Mark Ramont	Capital City Playhouse, Austin, TX
Woyzeck	Georg Buchner	Marie, Lead	Chuck Hudson	Century Ballroom, Seattle, WA
The Metamorphosis	Franz Kafka	Gregor, Lead	Chuck Hudson	Century Ballroom, Seattle, WA
K2	Patrick Meyers	Taylor, Lead	Benji Bittle	Genesis Theatre, Seattle, WA
Much Ado About Nothing	William Shakespeare	Hero, Lead	Terry Moore	Seattle Shakespeare Company, Seattle, WA
Midsummer Night's Dream	William Shakespeare	Puck, Lead	Anne Ciccolella	Austin Shakespeare Company, Austin, TX
Measure for Measure	William Shakespeare	Isabella, Lead	David Wright	Seattle Shakespeare Company, Seattle, WA
The Diary of Anne Frank	Frances Goodrich and Albert Hacket	Anne, Lead	Marianne Mavrides	Hollywood Playhouse, Hollywood, FL
Calliope Jam	Christopher Baker	Calliope, Lead	Michael Wilson	Alley Theatre, Houston, TX
As You Like It	William Shakespeare	Rosalind, Lead	Bernard Hopkins	Kresge Theatre, Pittsburgh, PA
The House of Bernarda Alba	Federico Garcia Lorca	Martirio, Lead	Rina Yerushalmi	Kresge Theatre, Pittsburgh, PA
A Flea in Her Ear	Georges Feydeau	Eugenie	Gregory Boyd	Alley Theatre, Houston, TX
American Vaudeville	Anne Bogart / Tina Landau	Ensemble	Anne Bogart	Alley Theatre, Houston, TX
The Rape of Lucrece	William Shakespeare	Chastity	Allison Halstead	AHA! Theatre, Seattle, WA
A Good List	Andrew Mellen	Frances	Andrew Mellen	Alice B. Theatre, Seattle, WA

== Theatre, directing and writing ==
Title	Playwright	Director	Venue
India Dreaming	Anne Marie Cummings	Anne Marie Cummings	Southeast Asia Museum, New York City, New York (development/audience)
Sinkhole	Anne Marie Cummings	Anne Marie Cummings	The Readers' Theatre, Ithaca, New York
Wrecks	Neil LaBute	Anne Marie Cummings	The Readers' Theatre, Ithaca, New York
Photograph51	Anna Ziegler	Anne Marie Cummings	The Readers' Theatre, Ithaca, New York
Detroit	Lisa D'Amour	Anne Marie Cummings	The Readers' Theatre, Ithaca, New York
Should've	Roald Hoffmann	Anne Marie Cummings	The Readers' Theatre, Ithaca, New York
God of Carnage	Yasmina Reza	Anne Marie Cummings	The Readers' Theatre, Ithaca, New York
Collected Stories	Donald Margulies	Anne Marie Cummings	The Readers' Theatre, Ithaca, New York
Fat Pig	Neil LaBute	Anne Marie Cummings	The Readers' Theatre, Ithaca, New York
No Child	Nilaja Sun	Anne Marie Cummings	The Readers' Theatre, Ithaca, New York
Oleanna	David Mamet	Anne Marie Cummings	The Readers' Theatre, Ithaca, New York
K2	Patrick Meyers	Anne Marie Cummings	The Readers' Theatre, Ithaca, New York
A Steady Rain	Keith Huff	Anne Marie Cummings	The Readers' Theatre, Ithaca, New York
Art	Yasmina Reza	Anne Marie Cummings	The Readers' Theatre, Ithaca, New York
Frozen	Bryony Lavery	Anne Marie Cummings	The Readers' Theatre, Ithaca, New York
Uncle Vanya	Anton Chekhov (the David Mamet adaptation)	Anne Marie Cummings	The Readers' Theatre, Ithaca, New York
True West	Sam Shepard	Anne Marie Cummings	The Readers' Theatre, Ithaca, New York
Extremes	Anne Marie Cummings	Anne Marie Cummings	The Readers' Theatre, Ithaca, New York
			Primary Stages, New York City, NY (a reading)
Helen of Purgatory	Anne Marie Cummings	Anne Marie Cummings	Culture Project, New York City, NY (a reading)
Purgatory Row	Anne Marie Cummings	Anne Marie Cummings	The Readers' Theatre, Ithaca, New York
Touche!	Anne Marie Cummings	Anne Marie Cummings	Classic Stage Company, New York City, NY (a reading)

== Short films, writer and director ==
Title	Writer	Director	Screening Venue
Easy Prey	Anne Marie Cummings	Anne Marie Cummings	Cinemapolis Movie Theatre, Ithaca, New York
Soul Mates	Anne Marie Cummings	Anne Marie Cummings	Kendal at Ithaca, Ithaca, New York
