= Conversations in L.A. =

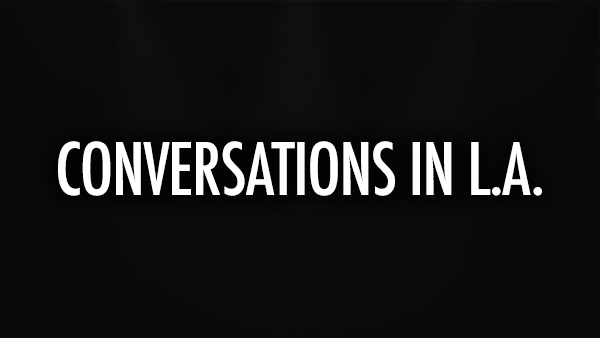
- Genre: Romantic Drama
- Written by: Anne Marie Cummings
- Story by: Anne Marie Cummings
- Directed by: Anne Marie Cummings (25); Brett Benner (3); Sebastian Heinrich (1)
- Starring: Anne Marie Cummings; Gustavo Velasquez; Eric Balfour; Brett Benner; Danny Bick; Bryan Chesters; Chris Damiano; Marquet Hill; Tami Tappan Damiano; Willie Garson; Vanita Harbour; Sterling Jones; Justin Kirk; Sally Kirkland; John Kozeluh; Mark Lewis; Rebecca Metz; Gabrielle Olivera; Lou Diamond Phillips; Amy Pietz; Jack Plotnick; Stephen Rockwell; Melanie Rockwell; Alyssa Gabrielle Rodriguez; Jack Standen; Terra Strong; Trey Teufel; Theresa Tilly; Jaymz Tuaileva; Matt Turner; Jon Patrick Walker; Mike E. Winfield
- Country of origin: United States
- Original language: English
- No. of seasons: 3
- No. of episodes: 29

Production
- Executive producers: Anne Marie Cummings (seasons 1-3); Brian Medavoy & Erwin More (season 3)
- Producers: Gustavo Velasquez (season 3); Winston A. Abalos (1 intro, season 3)
- Cinematography: Sebastian Heinrich (seasons 1 & 3); Roland Andre Miller (season 2)
- Editor: Sebastian Heinrich
- Camera setup: Single-camera
- Production company: Immediate Vision Productions

Original release
- Release: December 1, 2017 – October 16, 2019

Conversations in L.A. is a one-shot romantic drama television series about the relationship between an older woman and a much younger man that was created, written, and directed by veteran stage actress Anne Marie Cummings. It follows the conversations between Michelle and Gus as they meet and fall in love, and the conversations they have with the people they know, who oppose their relationship in the City of Angels. The decision Cummings made to have the series filmed in the one-shot style with 360-camera choreography, was to submerge viewers into the world of the characters, as well as give actors an exhilarating experience similar to that of being on stage - - building the consequential momentum of one emotional moment upon the next without having to “cut.”

All three seasons are available on Amazon Prime (United States, Canada, and UK), FandangoNOW, and ConversationsinLA.com, the series' home website. Seasons One and Two are available on iTunes (in English and Spanish).

Season One premiered on ConversationsinLA.com, with 14 episodes of differing lengths, on December 1, 2017. Season Two premiered its eight, half-hour episodes on December 16, 2018 on Amazon Prime (Season One moved to Amazon Prime during this time as well). Seasons One and Two also premiered on iTunes on December 16, 2018. Season Three premiered its eight, half-hour episodes on Amazon Prime on March 15, 2019. And FandangoNOW picked up all three seasons and premiered them on their platform in October 2019.

== Filming Style ==
All three seasons of Conversations in L.A. were produced by Anne Marie Cummings' film production company - Immediate Vision Productions. The signature of this series are its one-shot episodes that are shot with a single-camera and that are highly choreographed by writer/director Anne Marie Cummings. Seasons One and Three were filmed by Sebastian Heinrich, and Season Two was filmed by Roland Andre Miller.

== Season Three Cast ==
Season Three was cast by Christy Faison and Jami Rudofsky and includes Anne Marie Cummings ("Eat Bitter, Taste Sweet") and Gustavo Velasquez ("Insecure") with Lou Diamond Phillips (“Goliath,” “Longmire,” “La Bamba”), Justin Kirk (“Weeds” and “Angels in America”), Willie Garson (“White Collar,” “NYPD Blue,” and “Sex and the City”), Amy Pietz ("Curb Your Enthusiasm" and "Caroline in the City"), Eric Balfour ("Haven," "Skyline," and "Six Feet Under"), and Terra Strong ("The Litch").

== Full Cast ==
- Anne Marie Cummings as Michelle Macabee, a middle-aged woman having a mid-life crisis.
- Gustavo Velasquez as Gus Borrero, Michelle's young lover.
- Eric Balfour as Blaine, Michelle's commercial director.
- Danny Bick as Bernard, Michelle's commercial director's assistant.
- Brett Benner as Alex, Michelle's second best friend.
- Bryan Chesters as Derrick, Michelle's martini date.
- Chris Damiano as Wayne, a guy in Michelle's pet loss therapy group.
- Tami Tappan Damiano as Kelsey, a woman in Michelle's pet loss therapy group.
- Willie Garson as Dr. Kerr, Michelle and Gus’ second couple's therapist.
- Vanita Harbour as Nicole, Michelle's best friend.
- Marquet Hill as Dancer 2, a dancer in Michelle's commercial.
- Sterling Jones as Peter, Michelle's second best friend's pal.
- Justin Kirk as Michael Miller, Michelle's new friend.
- Sally Kirkland as Evelyn James, Michelle's second best friend's friend.
- John Kozeluh as Mark, Michelle's blind date.
- Mark Lewis as Seth Parker, Michelle's movie star friend.
- Rebecca Metz as Dr. Nowak, Michelle and Gus’ couple's therapist.
- Gabriel Olivera as Drake, a guy in Michelle's pet loss therapy group.
- Lou Diamond Phillips as Martin, Michelle's boyfriend's lifecoach teacher.
- Amy Pietz as Mrs. Shannon Pierce, Michelle and Gus’ social worker.
- Jack Plotnick as Adam, Michelle's second pet loss therapist.
- Stephen Rockwell as Steve, Michelle's brother.
- Melanie Rockwell as Chelsea, Michelle's brother's wife.
- Alyssa Gabrielle Rodriguez as Sonya, Michelle's boyfriend's sister.
- Terra Strong as Leanne, Michelle's boyfriend's sister's girlfriend.
- Trey Teufel as Joel, Michelle's second best friend's husband.
- Theresa Tilly as Marion, Michelle's first pet loss therapist.
- Jaymz Tuaileva as Dancer 1, a dancer in Michelle's commercial.
- Matt Turner as Bob, Michelle's ex co-worker.
- Jon Patrick Walker as Danny, Michelle's friend's drug pal.
- Mike E. Winfield as Jeremy, Michelle's boyfriend's drug dealer.

== Awards and nominations ==
- 2017 44th Daytime Emmy Awards
  - Outstanding Lead Actress in a Digital Daytime Drama Series – Anne Marie Cummings (Nominated)
  - Outstanding Lead Actor in a Digital Daytime Drama Series – Gustavo Velasquez (Nominated)
  - Outstanding Supporting or Guest Actress in a Digital Daytime Drama Series – Vanita Harbour (Nominated)
- 2017 6th HollyWeb Festival
  - Outstanding Digital Drama Series - Conversations in L.A. (Nominated)
- 2018 45th Daytime Emmy Awards
  - Outstanding Writing in a Digital Drama Series – Anne Marie Cummings (Nominated)
  - Outstanding Guest Performer in a Digital Drama Series – Mike E. Winfield (Nominated)
- 2018 9th New Media Film Festival
  - Outstanding Trailer in a Digital Drama Series - Conversations in L.A. (Nominated)
- 2019 46th Daytime Emmy Awards
  - Outstanding Guest Performer in a Digital Daytime Drama Series – Lou Diamond Phillips (Nominated)
  - Outstanding Writing in a Digital Daytime Drama Series – Anne Marie Cummings (Nominated)
  - Outstanding Directing in a Digital Daytime Drama Series – Anne Marie Cummings (Nominated)
- 2019 10th Indie Series Awards
  - BEST DIRECTING – ANNE MARIE CUMMINGS (WINNER)
  - BEST GUEST ACTOR – LOU DIAMOND PHILLIPS (WINNER)
  - Best Drama Series – Conversations in L.A. (Nominated)
  - Best Writing – Anne Marie Cummings (Nominated)
  - Best Cinematography – Sebastian Heinrich (Nominated)
  - Best Lead Actress – Anne Marie Cummings (Nominated)
  - Best Lead Actor – Gustavo Velasquez (Nominated)
  - Best Guest Actress – Terra Strong (Nominated)
- 2019 40th Telly Awards
  - BEST SCRIPTED SERIES - ANNE MARIE CUMMINGS (BRONZE WINNER)

== Critical reception ==
After Season One, the Huffington Post wrote, “Anne Marie Cummings is a force and Hollywood has taken note. As Creator, Cummings dares to go there. As Writer, Cummings is brilliant. As Actress, Cummings draws the audience in with each raw, real and authentic performance. As Director, Cummings commands nothing but the best from the entire cast.” USA Today wrote, “Anne Marie is living proof that it’s never too late to chase the dream, whatever that may be.” USA Today also wrote, “The finished product is…a study in the art of art.” Emmy Magazine said of the show, “…beautifully choreographed.” In an interview with AXS TV, Lou Diamond Phillips said of Anne Marie Cummings’ writing, “It reminded me a bit of Mamet. It reminded me a bit of Tarantino. There’s just some great conversational musicality to it…incredibly well-structured and compelling from line to line.” In the same interview, Lou Diamond Phillips said, "At this point in my career, after 40 years as a professional and 30 years in Hollywood, there are not many things where I can say, 'I've never done anything quite like that.'" Hollywood Alert wrote that Anne Marie Cummings, “…is the first woman to receive Emmy nominations for Digital Series Acting, Writing, and Directing.” Carlos Sottomayor Magazine wrote the series is, “A funny and witty series.” In an article by Stareable, it was written that, “Cummings’ theatre background is clear in their format.”

"Anne Marie Cummings is phenomenal! If you've never heard about her – now's your chance! She is the first woman to receive Emmy nominations in the digital drama categories of Acting, Writing, and Directing, and all for the three seasons of her Amazon Prime digital drama series about an older woman who falls in love with a much younger man called CONVERSATIONS IN L.A." – The Frank Magazine, UK
