= Angela's Christmas =

2017 English-language short film

- Film poster
- Directed by: Damien O'Connor
- Written by: Will Collins; Damien O'Connor
- Based on: Angela and the Baby Jesus by Frank McCourt
- Produced by: Ellen McCourt
- Starring: Malachy McCourt; Ruth Negga; Lucy O'Connell
- Music by: Darren Hendley
- Production companies: Brown Bag Films; 9 Story Media Group
- Distributed by: Netflix
- Release dates: December 8, 2017 (Los Angeles); November 30, 2018
- Running time: 30 minutes
- Countries: Ireland; Canada
- Language: English

Angela's Christmas is a 2017 animated short film directed by Damien O'Connor, written by Will Collins and Damien O'Connor and starring the Oscar nominees Ruth Negga in the role of Angela's mother, and Lucy O'Connell as Angela. The plot is based on the children's story from Pulitzer Prize winning Irish author Frank McCourt, and is set in Limerick, Ireland in the 1910s. The story revolves around Angela's (Lucy O'Connell) desire to make sure everyone is having a great Christmas. The film's cast and production team received three nominations at the 46th Daytime Creative Arts Emmy Awards and three at the 2018 Emile Awards.

== Plot ==
In Limerick 1914, Angela and her two older brothers Pat and Tom and younger sister Aggie, along with Mother, head to mass in a local church. During this, Angela spots Baby Jesus in the crib, and shows sympathy for him by believing he is cold. After mass, she convinces her mother to let her go back and light a candle. She agrees, but Angela instead takes Baby Jesus, and hides him from other people during her journey home.

After getting Baby Jesus into the backyard, she is spotted by Pat and he goes to tell the rest of the family, while Angela goes to her bedroom upstairs and lies down with Baby Jesus on her bed and sings him a lullaby.

After Pat's constant protests to make the family believe it is true, they go upstairs to find Angela with Baby Jesus and take both of them downstairs. Pat starts arguing with Angela as to how it happened. Mother breaks them up and tells them a story about what happened on New Year's Eve, when shortly after Angela was born, their father was arrested for taking coal out of the back off a fuel cart, despite just trying to make the house warm for the baby, and explains how saddened she was.

After the story, Angela decides to return Baby Jesus. While attempting to put him back in the crib, they are caught by the priest along with a guard who threatens to arrest them. Angela explains that she was just trying to keep Baby Jesus warm, and the guard takes them home.

While back home, Angela looks out the window and smiles before being called for dinner. In the church, Baby Jesus is shown wearing a Christmas sweater that Angela put on him.

== Cast ==
- Malachy McCourt as Narrator
- Ruth Negga as Mother
- Vivian Drew as Tom
- Anya O'Connor as Aggie
- Brendan Mullins as Pat
- Lucy O'Connell as Angela
- Brian Gleeson as Guard
- Pat Kinevane as Father Creagh / Mr. King
- Don Wycherley as Accordion Player

== Production ==
Angela's Christmas was executive produced by Frank McCourt's widow Ellen McCourt. This was Frank McCourt's only children's story, from a story his mother Angela told him and his brother Malachy McCourt, as a child. Malachy McCourt provides the narration. Dolores O'Riordan contributed to the soundtrack.

The film was produced by the Irish production studio Brown Bag Films, with distribution rights help by the Canadian company 9 Story Distribution International.

== Release ==
Angela's Christmas was released on 30 November 2018 on Netflix.

== Sequel ==
A sequel, titled Angela's Christmas Wish, was released on December 1, 2020.
