= Good Deeds =

- Theatrical release poster
- Directed by: Tyler Perry
- Written by: Tyler Perry
- Produced by: Tyler Perry; Paul Hall; Ozzie Areu
- Starring: Tyler Perry; Thandiwe Newton; Brian White; Rebecca Romijn; Jamie Kennedy; Phylicia Rashad; Gabrielle Union
- Cinematography: Alexander Gruszynski
- Edited by: Maysie Hoy
- Music by: Aaron Zigman
- Production company: Tyler Perry Studios
- Distributed by: Lionsgate
- Release date: February 24, 2012
- Running time: 111 minutes
- Country: United States
- Language: English
- Budget: $14 million
- Box office: $35.6 million

Good Deeds is a 2012 American romantic drama film written, co-produced, directed by and starring Tyler Perry with the rest of the cast consisting of Thandiwe Newton, Brian White, Rebecca Romijn, Jamie Kennedy, Phylicia Rashad, and Gabrielle Union. It tells the story of a CEO of a family-owned company who befriends a cleaning lady and falls for her.

The film was released on February 24, 2012. It received mixed reviews.

== Plot ==
Wesley Deeds is the CEO of the family-owned Deeds Corporation. Although he is incredibly wealthy, he has little in the sense of freedom and has come to adapt to a certain predictable lifestyle noted by his fiancée Natalie. One day before work, Wesley picks up his younger brother Walter, who lost his driver's license after a string of DUIs. They have lunch with their mother, the respectable Wilimena Deeds, who later meets with Natalie, Natalie's mother, and Natalie's best friend Heidi at the bridal shop. The two mothers urge Natalie to think about her future with Wesley, specifically children.

On the impoverished side of town, Lindsey Wakefield, a single mother and janitor for the Deeds Corporation, finds out from her building superintendent Milton she will be evicted by her landlady if she doesn't pay her bills soon. Lindsey rushes to pick up her check from work and ends up parking in Wesley's reserved spot, leaving her six-year-old daughter Ariel in the car. Wesley and Walter find Ariel who is too shy and scared to speak to them. Lindsay finds out from her boss that the IRS is holding most of her pay for the next six months, forcing her to take on the night shift to make up for the lost income. She returns to find her car towed and argues with Wesley and Walter. Wesley takes pity on Ariel and decides to let them have their car back. Lindsey takes Ariel to school while Wesley has a meeting with his co-worker and best friend, John, over acquiring a company Wesley's father has been competing against for years.

After work, Lindsey discovers she has been evicted. Taking her belongings, she picks up Ariel from school and works the night shift, where Ariel is forced to sleep in the broom closet as Lindsay works. While working late, Wesley catches Lindsey making a call to the IRS with a company phone which is grounds for termination. She is at first hostile to him, not realizing he is the CEO of the company, but begins to soften up and he again decides to let her off the hook. Wesley sees them parked outside the building after her shift is over, and decides to watch over them until Lindsey's "boyfriend" comes for them. Wesley then introduces himself to Ariel and reveals to Lindsay that he is in fact the CEO of the company. He takes Lindsey and Ariel out for pizza where the trio make a bond.

Meanwhile that night, Natalie and Heidi, who is also John’s wife, attend a fashion show in support of their friend Mark Freeze. When her friends bring her home, she tries to initiate sex with Wesley with the curtain’s open. Wesley is put off by this which angers a drunken Natalie who calls him out on being predictable and never spontaneous.

Wesley struggles to expand the business with Walter sabotaging the purchase of a long time rival company of Deeds Incorporated. John tries to warn him that Walter might be purposely trying to make Wesley fail so he can prove to everyone that he should be the one running the company. Wesley however, refuses to believe this.

Ariel's teacher finds out that Lindsey and Ariel are homeless and threatens to call child services. Wesley finds out as well later that night when working late again and finding Ariel in the broom closet. He brings her to his office and confronts Lindsey when she comes looking for her. He criticizes her for her treatment of her daughter and the responsibility she has put on her shoulders as a six year old. She tells him that he could never understand the choices she has had to make as a mother because he lives an incredibly privileged life.

Wesley at that point tries to make their lives easier since Lindsey has to bring Ariel with her to work at night. Lindsey also begins to bring out a more fun spirit in Wesley, and he begins to break from his predictable routines, which Natalie notices. However, since Ariel hasn’t been in school, child welfare was notified and takes Ariel to a foster home. Wesley watches in despair as Ariel is taken from her mother and offers Lindsey a rent-free corporate apartment, which allows her to regain custody of Ariel. When Wesley reveals he has always wanted to ride a motorcycle, Lindsey rents one and the pair ride across the countryside. They stop by a pond, where they kiss. Wesley admits he is engaged, and Lindsey leaves.

Deeds Incorporated takes over the rival company, but Walter ruins the celebration with his outburst. Lindsey arrives at the party to talk to Wesley, and although initially wanting to leave after seeing the wealthy crowd, Walter forces her to stay. Walter suggests to Wilimena that Wesley and Lindsey are having an affair. Wilimena hints to Lindsey that Wesley would not stay with someone poor for long. Natalie, Wesley, Walter, Wilimena, and Lindsey become trapped in an elevator after Wesley and Walter fight. Natalie and Wilimena notice Lindsey reaching for Wesley's hand, which was injured in the fight.

Wesley visits Lindsey that night, but she rejects him. Wesley and Natalie realize that, although they love each other, their marriage would not be happy because they are only together for their parents. They announce their split at their engagement party. Wesley also reveals he is quitting and traveling to see his old friends. He hires John as the new CEO of Deeds. Although initially angry, Walter accepts this and begins to make a change in his behavior and become more responsible.

Wesley tells Lindsey he is going to Nigeria and invites Lindsey and Ariel along. Lindsey again rejects him as she is afraid of rejection.

After being seen off by Wilimena, Wesley boards his plane. As the plane is taking off, he sees Lindsey and Ariel sitting across the aisle. Wesley and Lindsey kiss while Ariel looks on happily.

== Cast ==
- Tyler Perry as Wesley Deeds III, the CEO of Deeds Corporation.
- Thandiwe Newton as Lindsey Wakefield (credited as Thandie Newton), a cleaning lady that goes to work for Wesley.
- Brian J. White as Walter Deeds, the irritable younger brother of Wesley.
- Jamie Kennedy as Mark Freeze, a fashion designer.
- Phylicia Rashad as Wilimena Deeds, the mother of Wesley and Walter.
- Gabrielle Union as Natalie, the fiancée of Wesley.
- Rebecca Romijn as Heidi, a friend of Natalie.
- Eddie Cibrian as John, Wesley's co-worker and best friend and Heidi’s husband.
- Jordenn Thompson as Ariel, Lindsay's six-year-old daughter.
- Beverly Johnson as Brenda
- Andrew Masset as Mr. Brunson
- Victoria Loving as Mrs. Brunson
- Tom Thon as Milton, the building superintendent of Lindsey and Ariel's apartment.

== Production ==
Good Deeds was produced by Perry's 34th Street Films. Principal photography took place in Atlanta from April 25, 2011 to June 2011. Good Deeds was released through Lionsgate and Tyler Perry Studios on February 24, 2012.

== Release ==
=== Critical reaction ===
As of May 2025, the film has received mixed reviews. The film holds a 37% approval rating on Rotten Tomatoes, based on 35 reviews with an approval rating of 5.10 out of 10. Its consensus states, "Tyler Perry's craftmanship as a director continues to improve, but his stories are still the same ol' hoary, pretentious melodramas." Metacritic reported that the film has an average score of 43 out of 100 based on 15 reviews. Audiences polled by CinemaScore gave the film an average grade of "A" on an A+ to F scale.

=== Box office ===
The film grossed $15,583,924, ranking second on its opening weekend. As of November 2012, the film has grossed a total gross of $35,025,791.

=== Home media ===
The DVD was released on June 12, 2012.

== Lawsuit ==
In November 2012, author Terri Donald sued Perry claiming Good Deeds was based on her book, Bad Apples Can Be Good Fruit, published in 2007. Donald sought $225,000 in initial damages and: an injunction requiring the company to add a credit for her book in the opening and closing credits, and an accounting of the film's revenue. Donald reportedly sent a copy of her book to Tyler under the pseudonym, TLO Red'ness, before the film went into production.

In August 2013, U.S. District Court Judge William Pauley III dismissed the lawsuit stating that copyright law only protects expression and not ideas, and there was little similarity in the content.

== Awards and nominations ==
- BET Awards
  - Best Movie
- Golden Raspberry Awards
  - Worst Actor (Tyler Perry) - Nominated
  - Worst Director (Tyler Perry) - Nominated
- NAACP Image Award
  - Outstanding Actor in a Motion Picture (Tyler Perry) - Nominated

== See also ==
- List of black films of the 2010s
