= Shanti Lowry =

American actress and dancer

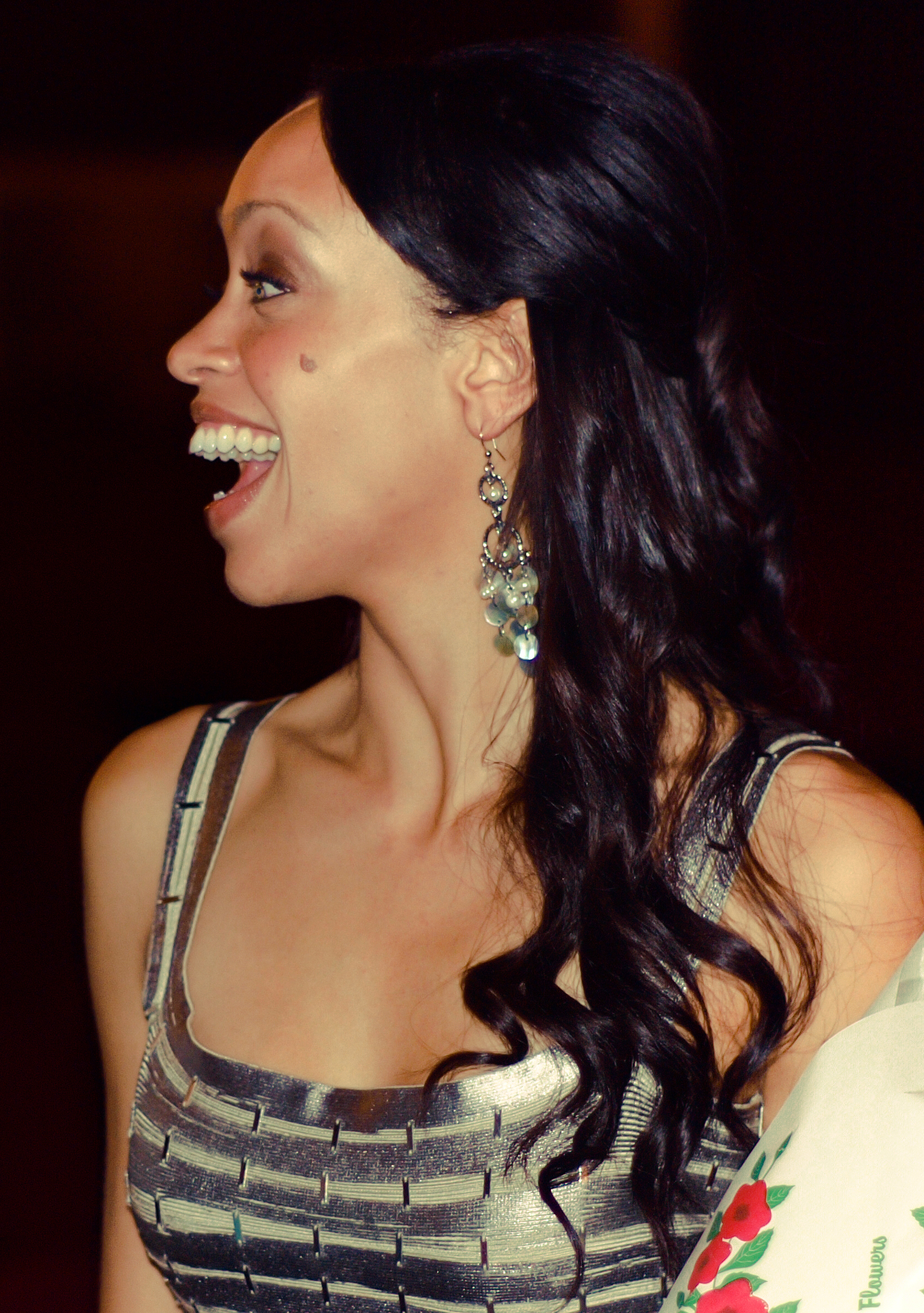
- Lowry in August 2010
- Education: Rocky Mountain School of Dance and Performing Arts
- Occupations: Actress dancer
- Years active: 2000–present
- Website: shantilowry.com

Shanti Lowry is an American actress and dancer. She is best known for her roles as the Treasure Chest Dancer in the 2003 film Charlie's Angels: Full Throttle, and the recurring role as Dionne Taylor on the television series The Game. She is sometimes credited as Shati Lowry.

== Career ==
A graduate of the Rocky Mountain School of Dance, Inc, Lowry moved to Los Angeles in 1999 in order to pursue a career in acting and dancing. Her very first role was in a dancing movie never released in the United States or United Kingdom. Many of her future roles would also incorporate the techniques she took with her from school. Due to her casting in the 2010 film, Bolden!, Lowry had a very limited role in the third season of The Game. Lowry was nominated for a 2019 and a 2020 Daytime Emmy for Outstanding Lead Actress in a Digital Daytime Drama Series for her role as Yolanda Rodriguez on Bronx SIU.

== Filmography ==
=== Film ===
Year	Title	Role	Notes
2002	A Time for Dancing	Eva	
2003	D.E.B.S.	Dominique	Short
2003	Charlie's Angels: Full Throttle	Treasure Chest Dancer	
2003	Looney Tunes: Back in Action	Dancer	
2005	Silent Scream	Chloe	
2010	Louis	Grace	
2011	The Ideal Husband	Tracy	TV movie
2012	The Coalition	Dylan Singletary	Video
2013	Weed for Christmas	Mrs. Clause	Short
2013	What Would You Do for Love	Lucky	TV movie
2014	Stand Down Soldier	Terri	
2015	Lucky Girl	Brianna Nolan	
2016	Who's Driving Doug	Elation	
2016	Psyched	Alex	Short
2018	The Selfie Queen	Akilah	Short
2019	Bolden	Polyhymnia	
2021	The Magic	Velma Abbott	
2021	Christmas for Sale	Terri McKenzie	TV movie
2021	Lover's Discretion	Ashley	Short
2023	Alter	Linda	Short
2023	Momma Said Come Home for Christmas	Cecee	
2025	#WorstChristmasever	Alicia Turner	

=== Television ===
Year	Title	Role	Notes
2000	Nikki	Dancer	Episode: "Topless"
2001	That '70s Show	Dancer	Episode: "Bye Bye Basement"
2003	NYPD Blue	Maisha Houston	Episode: "Arrested Development"
2005	Days of Our Lives	Dancer	Episode: "Episode #1.10157"
2006	Girlfriends	Dionne Marie Taylor	Episode: "The Game"
2006	Shark	Michelle	Episode: "Dial M for Monica"
2006–15	The Game	Dionne Marie Taylor	Recurring Cast: Season 1-3 & 8
2007	Tell Me You Love Me	Cosmetics Saleswoman	Episode: "Episode #1.9"
2010	Love That Girl!	Sylvia	Episode: "My Guy Friend"
2010	Make It or Break It	Lacey	Episode: "I Won't Dance, Don't Ask Me"
2012	The Closer	Ann Mason	Recurring Cast: Season 7
2012	Don't Trust the B— in Apartment 23	Valentina	Guest Cast: Season 1–2
2012–20	Family Time	Cheryl	Guest: Season 1, Recurring Cast: Season 2 & 4–8
2013	Two and a Half Men	Tara/Tanya	Episode: "I Think I Banged Lucille Ball"
2015–18	Code Black	Cheryl	Guest: Season 1, Recurring Cast: Season 3
2016	School of Rock	Miss Ipson	Episode: "(Really Really) Old Time Rock and Roll"
2016	Uncle Buck	Holly	Episode: "Brothers"
2016	Murder in the First	Daphne Parker	Episode: "Tropic of Cancer"
2017	Hand of God	Quarla	Episode: "Gathering Dust"
2017	Kingdom	-	Episode: "Platinum Level"
2018–19	Bronx SIU	Yolanda Rodriguez	Main Cast
2021	Urban Horror Series	Ashley	Episode: "Lover's Discretion"
