= Bronx SIU =

American television series

- Genre: Police procedural
- Starring: Brian J. White; Ameer Baraka; Denise Boutte; Shanti Lowry
- Original language: English
- No. of seasons: 2
- No. of episodes: 14

Original release
- Network: Urban Movie Channel

Bronx SIU is an American television series on the Urban Movie Channel that focuses on an elite task force, based out of The Bronx, that handles New York City's most demanding and difficult cases. The show premiered in 2018 and was then renewed for a second season. Bronx SIU follows the pursuits of Jimmy Blue, a homicide detective and Marine veteran who has post traumatic stress disorder. After a string of homicides, Jimmy is commissioned to head up a team of investigators tasked with solving only the most heinous crimes. In 2019, Bronx SIU received three Daytime Emmy nominations. In 2020, Bronx SIU also received three Daytime Emmy nominations.

== Cast ==
- Brian J. White as Jimmy Blue
- Shanti Lowry as Yolanda Rodriguez
