= Brian J. White =

American actor (born 1975)

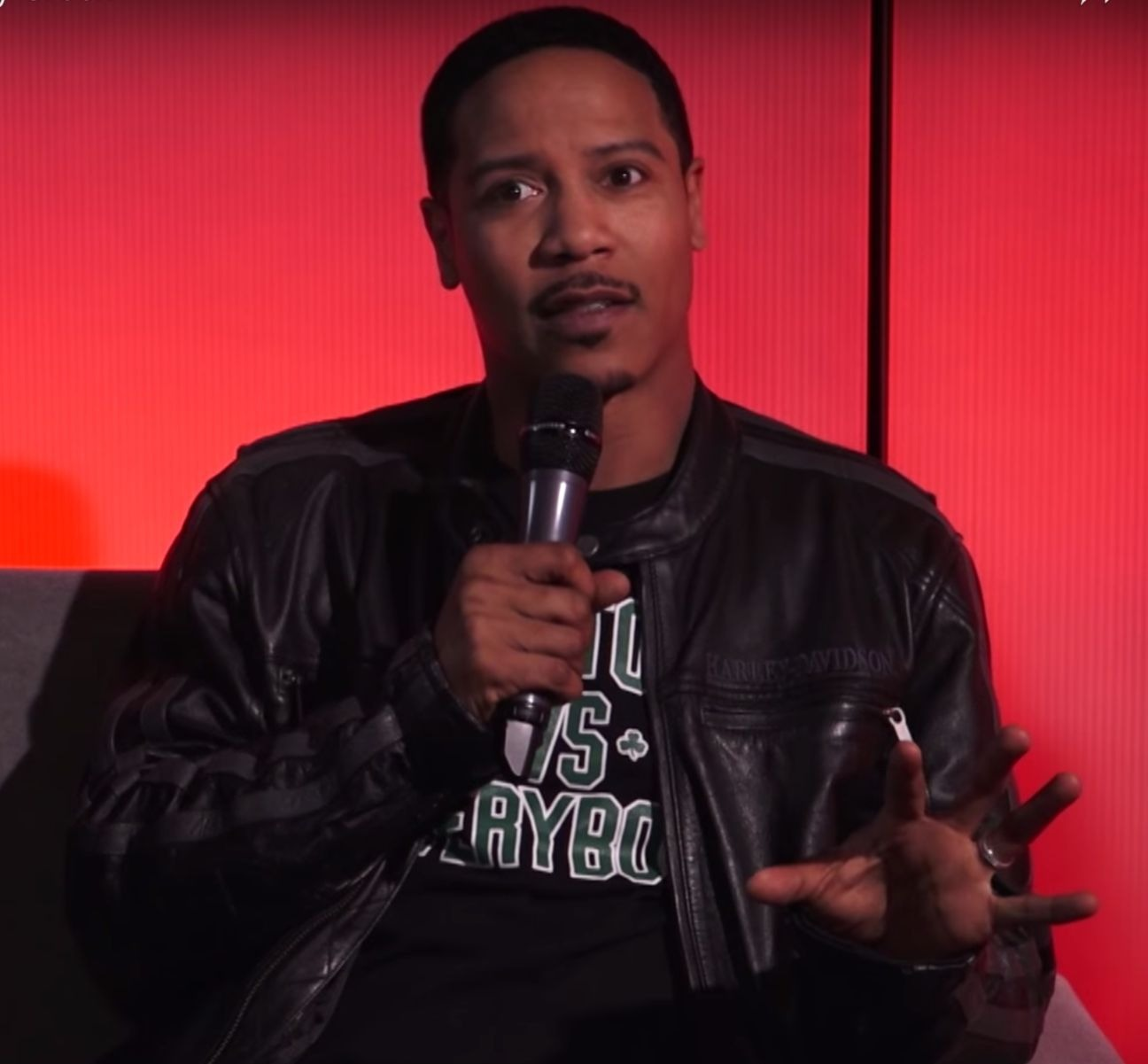
- White in 2018
- Born: Brian Joseph White; April 21, 1975 (age 51); Boston, Massachusetts, U.S.
- Occupation: Actor
- Years active: 1997–present
- Spouse: Paula Da Silva (m. 2010)
- Children: 1

Brian Joseph White (born April 21, 1975) is an American actor. He is best known for his roles in films such as The Family Stone (2005), The Game Plan (2007), 12 Rounds (2009), I Can Do Bad All by Myself (2009), Good Deeds (2012), and The Cabin in the Woods (2012). On television, White had prominent roles in Men of a Certain Age (2009–11), Beauty & the Beast (2012–13), and Ambitions (2019).

== Early life ==
White was born in Boston, Massachusetts, the son of Estela Bowser, a financial advisor, and Jo Jo White, a Hall of Fame basketball player for the Boston Celtics, sports executive, and restaurateur. He is the oldest of six children. White graduated from Newton South High School and Dartmouth College, where he was a member of the Kappa Pi Kappa fraternity.

Before becoming a professional actor, White passed his Series 7 exam and worked for some time as a stockbroker.

== Career ==
White began acting in a number of television series such as Moesha, The Parkers, Spyder Games, Second Time Around, and The Shield. He then moved into film roles, appearing in The Family Stone, Brick, Stomp the Yard, The Game Plan, and In the Name of the King: A Dungeon Siege Tale. He had a recurring role as Lieutenant Carl Davis on Moonlight. In 2009, White appeared in the films Fighting and 12 Rounds. He starred in I Can Do Bad All by Myself, and followed this with a regular role in the series Men of a Certain Age.

In 2011, White starred in The Heart Specialist and Politics of Love. He then began touring with the David E. Talbert stage play What My Husband Doesn't Know. The tour ran from May 8 to December 18. White became the co-host of the UNCF national "Empower Me" tour and starred in the music video for Monica's song "Until it's Gone". In 2012, he appeared in Good Deeds and The Cabin in the Woods. In 2015, he appeared in the television series Scandal as the love interest of Olivia Pope. In 2014, he starred in the music video from Indonesian singer Agnez Mo titled "Coke Bottle" and "As Long As I Get Paid". He had a recurring role as Captain Dallas Patterson in season 4 of NBC's Chicago Fire.

In 2016 he hosted the Miss Grand International 2016 pageant in Las Vegas, United States on October 25, 2016 where Indonesia's Ariska Putri Pertiwi won the title.

In 2018, White began starring in the two Urban Movie Channel drama series, Bronx SIU and Monogamy. In 2019 and 2020, he received Daytime Emmy Award nomination for Outstanding Lead Actor in a Digital Daytime Drama Series for Bronx SIU. In 2019, he starred opposite Robin Givens in the Oprah Winfrey Network prime time soap opera, Ambitions.

== Personal life ==
White and Paula Da Silva married in 2010. They have a daughter who was born in 2014.

== Filmography ==
=== Film ===
Year	Title	Role	Notes
1997	The Matchmaker	Jason	
1999	The Best Man	Bachelor Party and Wedding Guest	
2000	Something to Sing About	Robert	TV movie
2001	Me and Mrs. Jones	Tracy Wainwright	
2002	For Mature Audiences Only	Model	Short
2003	The Lone Ranger	Joseph Freedman	TV movie
2003	The Movie Hero	Antoine Thompson/The Sidekick	
2003	This Girl's Life	DB	
2003	Malibooty!	Jamal Webber	Video
2003	Redemption	Christian Rayne	Video
2004	Mr. 3000	T-Rex Pennebaker	
2004	Trois: The Escort	Trent Meyer	Video
2005	Brick	Brad Bramish	
2005	Dirty	Officer Sayed	
2005	The Family Stone	Patrick Thomas	
2005	Venice Underground	Thomas Bendenelli	
2006	DOA: Dead or Alive	Zack	
2007	Stomp the Yard	Sylvester	
2007	Daddy's Little Girls	Christopher	
2007	In the Name of the King	Commander Tarish	
2007	Motives 2	Donovan Cook	Video
2007	The Game Plan	Jamal Webber	
2007	Football Wives	Kyle Jameson	TV movie
2009	12 Rounds	Detective Hank Carver	
2009	Fighting	Evan Hailey	
2009	I Can Do Bad All by Myself	Randy	
2011	The Heart Specialist	Dr. Ray Howard	
2011	Politics of Love	Kyle Franklin	
2011	The Cabin in the Woods	Daniel Truman	
2012	What My Husband Doesn't Know	Paul	Video
2012	Good Deeds	Walter Deeds	
2013	Someone to Love	Darrell Brent	
2014	Getting Even	Ike Williamson	
2015	Walter	Darren	
2015	My Favorite Five	Christopher Michaels	
2015	With This Ring	Damon	TV movie
2015	Bachelors	Miles	
2015	Where Children Play	Jeremy Spencer	
2016	36 Hour Layover	Quincy	
2016	Only for One Night	William	
2017	Media	Michael Jones	TV movie
2018	Amateur	Vince	
2018	We Belong Together	Detective Daily	
2018	Never Heard	Manuel Jackson	
2019	Black Privilege	Alderman Tryone Burke	TV movie
2019	Dear Frank	Frank	
2019	A Shot for Justice	Brandon Williams	
2021	The Men in My Life	Kevin	
2023	Every Breath She Takes	Billy	TV movie
2027	The Families Stone	Patrick Thomas	Filming

=== Television ===
Year	Title	Role	Notes
2000	Felicity	Student #1	Episode: "Running Mates"
2000	Moesha	Gabe	Recurring Cast: Season 5
2001	Spyder Games	Alex Peters	Recurring Cast
2001	The Parkers	Omar	Episode: "Crazy Love"
2002	The Wonderful World of Disney	Sweet Money	Episode: "Nancy Drew"
2003	Lizzie McGuire	Pizza Guy	Episode: "The Gordo Shuffle"
2003-08	The Shield	Detective Tavon Garris	Recurring Cast: Season 2-3, Guest: Season 7
2004-05	Second Time Around	Nigel Muse	Main Cast
2006	In Justice	Scott Burrows	Episode: "Victims"
2007	Ghost Whisperer	Officer Barrett	Episode: "The Cradle Will Rock" & "Children of Ghosts"
2007-08	Moonlight	Lieutenant Carl Davis	Recurring Cast
2009	CSI: Miami	Kurt Sabin	Episode: "Head Case"
2009-11	Men of a Certain Age	Marcus	Main Cast
2011	Body of Proof	Brian Hall	Episode: "Letting Go"
2011	9ine	Michael	Recurring Cast
2011	Love Bites	Dante	Episode: "Stand and Deliver"
2012	CSI: Miami	Greg McCallister	Episode: "Terminal Velocity"
2012	Burn Notice	Agent Woods	Episode: "Unchained"
2012-13	Beauty & the Beast	Joe Bishop	Main Cast: Season 1
2013-14	Hostages	Colonel Thomas Blair	Recurring Cast
2014	Major Crimes	DDA Jeff Lee	Episode: "Letting It Go"
2014	Hawaii Five-0	Jason Hollier	Episode: "Ka Makuakaneka"
2015	Suits	Garrett Brady	Episode: "Respect"
2015	Another Period	Chauncey Alistair	Episode: "Senate"
2015	Mistresses	Blair Patterson	Recurring Cast: Season 3
2015	Chicago P.D.	Dallas Patterson	Episode: "A Dead Kid, a Notebook, and a Lot of Maybes"
2015	Scandal	Franklin Russell	Recurring Cast: Season 4, Guest: Season 5
2015	Chicago Fire	Dallas Patterson	Recurring Cast: Season 4
2016	Colony	George	Episode: "A Brave New World"
2017	APB	Reggie Walker	Episode: "Above & Beyond"
2017-18	Ray Donovan	Jay White	Recurring Cast: Season 5-6
2018	Taken	Julius Vox	Episode: "OPSEC"
2018	Young & Hungry	Eric	Episode: "Young & Bullseye"
2018-19	Bronx SIU	Jimmy Blue	Main Cast
2018-21	Monogamy	Dallas	Main Cast
2019	Ambitions	Evan Lancaster	Main Cast
2020	Stereoscope	Lewis Thomas	Main Cast
2022-24	The Black Hamptons	Jeffery Bowen	Main Cast
2023	Fosters Law	Edward Foster	Main Cast
2024	The Rookie	Mark Greer	Episode: "The Vow"
2024	Criminal Minds	Vincent Orlov	Recurring Cast: Season 17

== Awards and nominations ==
Year	Award	Category	Nominated work	Result
2019	Daytime Emmy Awards	Daytime Emmy Award for Outstanding Digital Daytime Drama Series	Bronx SIU	Nominated
2020	Daytime Emmy Awards	Daytime Emmy Award for Outstanding Digital Daytime Drama Series	Bronx SIU	Nominated
2020	Indie Series Awards	Indie Series Award for Best Lead Actor — Drama	Bronx SIU	Nominated

== Stage ==
Year	Title	Role
2010	What My Husband Doesn't Know	Paul
