= New Media Film Festival =

- Location: Los Angeles
- Country: United States
- Reward: US$45,000
- Founder: Susan Johnston
- Website: www.newmediafilmfestival.com

New Media Film Festival is an event held annually that celebrates "the interactivity of new technologies and formats for Media and Cinema with global consciousness". According to the organizers, the festival honors "Stories Worth Telling that are created by people of All Ages-All Cultures-All Media". It showcases 3D and animated shorts, web series, mobile media, apps, and music videos, awarding over $45,000 in prizes and offering distribution to non-traditional and web-based filmmakers of the digital era.

== History ==
New Media Film Festival was founded by Susan Johnston in 2009. She is known as a Media Futurist currently holding the position of President at Select Services Films, Inc., a film production company. As a kid, Susan was on the set of the Great Gatsby (1949) where she met Robert Redford while her father was handling the antique cars.

In 2009 New Media Film Festival was announced in Second Life as part of the C3 – United Nations – Millennium Project as an annual event.

== Event features ==
The event screens more than a dozen select submissions from around the world, often featuring well-known actors and industry professionals in addition to student filmmakers. The Festival also includes world premieres and discussion panels. Films submitted to the Festival are reviewed by a panel of judges including Pixar, The Caucus, Industrial Light & Magic Lorne Lanning, Spencer Halpin, and a variety of other Oscar, Grammy, and Sundance winners and nominees.

== Awards presented ==
Awards are given out in the following categories at the conclusion of the Festival:

- 3D Shorts
- 3D Features
- Animation
- Apps
- Digital Comics
- Documentary
- Drone
- Feature
- LGBT
- Machinima
- Mobile/Tablet
- Music Video
- New Media
- Pilots
- Scripts
- Shorts
- ShotOnRed
- Sniplers
- SRC
- Student
- Trailers
- Virtual Reality
- Webisode
- Web Series

Winners in each category are viewed by a distributor with a chance of online, TV or theatrical distribution in addition to monetary prizes. Each category’s winner is included in the “Best of LA” screening series, submitted to additional festivals worldwide.
