= I Can Do Bad All by Myself =

I Can Do Bad All By Myself may refer to:

- I Can Do Bad All by Myself (play), a 1999 play written by Tyler Perry
- I Can Do Bad All by Myself (film), a 2009 film written by Perry, which is not an adaptation of the play.
