= Diary of a Mad Black Woman (play) =

Popular American stage play

- Original language: English
- Written by: Tyler Perry
- Characters: Daddy Charles, Madea, Helen, Charles, Myrtle, Orlando, Willie, Brenda and Angelo
- Subject: Marriage
- Genre: Comedy-Drama
- Setting: Mansion

Premiere
- Date: January 16, 2001
- Place: New Orleans

Tyler Perry's Diary of a Mad Black Woman is a 2001 American stage play written, directed and produced by Tyler Perry. The production starred Tyler Perry as Daddy Charles & Madea and Marva King as Helen Simmons-McCarter. The live performance released on DVD and VHS was recorded live in Atlanta at the Atlanta Civic Center in May 2001.

== Synopsis ==
Helen McCarter (King) is a loving wife to her successful millionaire husband and attorney, Charles McCarter (Blake). For twenty years, they have lived in a mansion on the inner part of the city. It appears that Helen is living the perfect life, but things are not as they seem, seeing as how Helen and Charles' marriage seems to be slowly falling apart. Charles' father, an elderly mail clerk by the name of Daddy Charles (Perry), talks to Helen, realizing that she is not as happy as she seems. He knows that Helen loves Charles, exclaiming to his son later in the play, "I dunno why she loves you, but she loves you to death." Helen also confides in her friend, Brenda (Robinson), an attorney who also works at Charles' firm, and her mother, Myrtle (Mann), who also thinks that Helen's marriage is still going well. Helen also reveals that Charles has also been abusing her physically after trying to cover up a bruise she received with a story claiming to have " hit herself in the eye with a cabinet door."

As their anniversary approaches, the McCarters continue to argue more and more. Finally, on the night of the anniversary, Charles admits to Helen that he has not been happy for quite sometime, and also tells her that he wants a divorce, revealing that he has been having an affair with another woman, who is Helen's friend Brenda. After humiliating Helen, Charles leaves her, telling her she can have the house and $2,000 a month.

The next day, Madea comes to visit Helen, trying to encourage her. However, when Brenda comes over, things start to escalate. When Brenda taunts Helen about the break-up, Helen grabs a gun in an attempt to "accidentally" kill Brenda. Myrtle arrives just in time to tell her daughter about Charles' car accident and keep her from killing Brenda. As Helen snatches the wig from the horrified Brenda, Madea attempts to shoot the mistress. Following this incident, Helen and Myrtle have a heated argument about the situation, leading Myrtle to almost wash her hands of her daughter. But, upon realizing that Helen really placed the blame on Charles, Brenda, and (lamentably) God, Myrtle turns back and urges her to direct her anger at the devil and reevaluate her faith in Christ.

Meanwhile, Helen receives a package from a delivery man named Orlando (Moore). Helen scolds him for what seems as though trying to flirt with her. Madea then recognizes Orlando in a magazine as a successful and wealthy business owner. Helen apologizes to Orlando, but Orlando blocks her advance, claiming that she is only doing so because she found out that he was rich. Helen finally tells him of her troubles and the two become friends. Brenda returns once more, this time bringing the paralyzed Charles to Helen, claiming that she cannot take care of him anymore and that she is not a care giver. Brenda then leaves quickly as Helen was trying to pull her wig off again, like she did when Myrtle told her about Charles, but not before being shot by Madea, who exclaims, "I got her, girl. Let me get the hell out!" Helen talks to Charles and laughs at the fact that he is now suffering. She leaves him sitting in the living room for days without feeding and bathing him. Charles begins to apologize and begs to just be left to die, but Helen refuses and tells him that she wants him to suffer for everything that he did to her. Later, Madea, who has been captured by the police later in the play for attempted murder, and Myrtle come over to tell Helen that Madea and Daddy Charles, who was sent to a home, had been working together and delivering letters from Charles job to Helen and make her see that she is now the acting owner of the company and quickly fires someone over the phone (probably Brenda), much to Myrtle's chagrin.

Over time, Helen begins a relationship with Orlando. And soon, Charles reveals that he is no longer paralyzed. Helen signs the divorce papers and prepares to leave with Orlando. As she is about to leave, she realizes that she is still in love with Charles, returns and makes Charles promise to never hurt her again, and the two begin anew.

== Tour Dates ==
Scheduled shows
Date	City	Venue
January 16, 2001	New Orleans	Saenger Theatre
January 17, 2001	New Orleans	Saenger Theatre
January 18, 2001	New Orleans	Saenger Theatre
January 19, 2001	New Orleans	Saenger Theatre
January 20, 2001	New Orleans	Saenger Theatre
January 21, 2001	New Orleans	Saenger Theatre
January 23, 2001	Washington, D.C.	Warner Theatre
January 24, 2001	Washington, D.C.	Warner Theatre
January 25, 2001	Washington, D.C.	Warner Theatre
January 26, 2001	Washington, D.C.	Warner Theatre
January 27, 2001	Washington, D.C.	Warner Theatre
January 28, 2001	Washington, D.C.	Warner Theatre
February 1, 2001	Columbia	Township Auditorium
February 2, 2001	Columbia	Township Auditorium
February 3, 2001	Columbia	Township Auditorium
February 4, 2001	Columbia	Township Auditorium
February 8, 2001	New Orleans	Saenger Theatre
February 9, 2001	New Orleans	Saenger Theatre
February 10, 2001	New Orleans	Saenger Theatre
February 11, 2001	New Orleans	Saenger Theatre
February 15, 2001	Memphis	Orpheum Theatre
February 16, 2001	Memphis	Orpheum Theatre
February 17, 2001	Memphis	Orpheum Theatre
February 18, 2001	Memphis	Orpheum Theatre
February 20, 2001	Chicago	New Regal Theater
February 21, 2001	Chicago	New Regal Theater
February 22, 2001	Chicago	New Regal Theater
February 23, 2001	Chicago	New Regal Theater
February 24, 2001	Chicago	New Regal Theater
February 25, 2001	Chicago	New Regal Theater
February 27, 2001	Chicago	New Regal Theater
February 28, 2001	Chicago	New Regal Theater
March 1, 2001	Chicago	New Regal Theater
March 2, 2001	Chicago	New Regal Theater
March 3, 2001	Chicago	New Regal Theater
March 4, 2001	Chicago	New Regal Theater
March 12, 2001	Washington, D.C.	Warner Theatre
March 13, 2001	Washington, D.C.	Warner Theatre
March 14, 2001	Washington, D.C.	Warner Theatre
March 15, 2001	Washington, D.C.	Warner Theatre
March 16, 2001	Washington, D.C.	Warner Theatre
March 17, 2001	Washington, D.C.	Warner Theatre
March 18, 2001	Washington, D.C.	Warner Theatre
March 22, 2001	Indianapolis	Murat Theatre
March 23, 2001	Indianapolis	Murat Theatre
March 24, 2001	Indianapolis	Murat Theatre
March 25, 2001	Indianapolis	Murat Theatre
May 1, 2001	Jacksonville	Times-Union Center for the Performing Arts
May 2, 2001	Jacksonville	Times-Union Center for the Performing Arts
May 3, 2001	Jacksonville	Times-Union Center for the Performing Arts
May 4, 2001	Jacksonville	Times-Union Center for the Performing Arts
May 5, 2001	Jacksonville	Times-Union Center for the Performing Arts
May 6, 2001	Jacksonville	Times-Union Center for the Performing Arts
May 8, 2001	Atlanta	Atlanta Civic Center (DVD Recording)
May 9, 2001	Atlanta	Atlanta Civic Center (DVD Recording)
May 10, 2001	Atlanta	Atlanta Civic Center (DVD Recording)
May 11, 2001	Atlanta	Atlanta Civic Center (DVD Recording)
May 12, 2001	Atlanta	Atlanta Civic Center (DVD Recording)
May 13, 2001	Atlanta	Atlanta Civic Center (DVD Recording)
June 7, 2001	Oakland	Paramount Theatre
June 8, 2001	Oakland	Paramount Theatre
June 9, 2001	Oakland	Paramount Theatre
June 10, 2001	Oakland	Paramount Theatre
July 12, 2001	Los Angeles	Wiltern Theatre
July 13, 2001	Los Angeles	Wiltern Theatre
July 14, 2001	Los Angeles	Wiltern Theatre
July 15, 2001	Los Angeles	Wiltern Theatre
July 24, 2001	Washington, D.C.	Warner Theatre
July 25, 2001	Washington, D.C.	Warner Theatre
July 26, 2001	Washington, D.C.	Warner Theatre
July 27, 2001	Washington, D.C.	Warner Theatre
July 28, 2001	Washington, D.C.	Warner Theatre
July 29, 2001	Washington, D.C.	Warner Theatre
July 31, 2001	Chicago	New Regal Theater
August 1, 2001	Chicago	New Regal Theater
August 2, 2001	Chicago	New Regal Theater
August 3, 2001	Chicago	New Regal Theater
August 4, 2001	Chicago	New Regal Theater
August 5, 2001	Chicago	New Regal Theater
September 4, 2001	Detroit	Music Hall Center for the Performing Arts
September 5, 2001	Detroit	Music Hall Center for the Performing Arts
September 6, 2001	Detroit	Music Hall Center for the Performing Arts
September 7, 2001	Detroit	Music Hall Center for the Performing Arts
September 8, 2001	Detroit	Music Hall Center for the Performing Arts
September 9, 2001	Detroit	Music Hall Center for the Performing Arts
September 18, 2001	Philadelphia	Merriam Theater
September 19, 2001	Philadelphia	Merriam Theater
September 20, 2001	Philadelphia	Merriam Theater
September 21, 2001	Philadelphia	Merriam Theater
September 22, 2001	Philadelphia	Merriam Theater
September 23, 2001	Philadelphia	Merriam Theater
October 23, 2001	New York City	Beacon Theatre
October 24, 2001	New York City	Beacon Theatre
October 25, 2001	New York City	Beacon Theatre
October 26, 2001	New York City	Beacon Theatre
October 27, 2001	New York City	Beacon Theatre
October 28, 2001	New York City	Beacon Theatre
November 1, 2001	Augusta	Bell Auditorium
November 2, 2001	Augusta	Bell Auditorium
November 3, 2001	Augusta	Bell Auditorium
November 4, 2001	Augusta	Bell Auditorium
November 6, 2001	Dallas	Bruton Theatre
November 7, 2001	Dallas	Bruton Theatre
November 8, 2001	Dallas	Bruton Theatre
November 9, 2001	Dallas	Bruton Theatre
November 10, 2001	Dallas	Bruton Theatre
November 11, 2001	Dallas	Bruton Theatre
November 14, 2001	Cleveland	Allen Theatre
November 15, 2001	Cleveland	Allen Theatre
November 16, 2001	Cleveland	Allen Theatre
November 17, 2001	Cleveland	Allen Theatre
November 18, 2001	Cleveland	Allen Theatre
November 23, 2001	Memphis	Orpheum Theatre
November 24, 2001	Memphis	Orpheum Theatre
November 25, 2001	Memphis	Orpheum Theatre
November 27, 2001	Baltimore	Lyric Opera House
November 28, 2001	Baltimore	Lyric Opera House
November 29, 2001	Baltimore	Lyric Opera House
November 30, 2001	Baltimore	Lyric Opera House
December 1, 2001	Baltimore	Lyric Opera House
December 2, 2001	Baltimore	Lyric Opera House

== Cast ==
=== Filmed Cast ===
- Tyler Perry as Daddy Charles and Madea
- Marva King as Helen Simmons-McCarter
- Curtis Blake as Charles McCarter
- Cordell Moore as Orlando
- Tamela Mann as Myrtle Miller
- Tunja Robinson as Brenda
- Regina McCrary as Angelo
- Ty London as Willie

=== Live Tour Cast ===
- Tyler Perry as Daddy Charles and Madea
- Marva King as Helen Simmons-McCarter
  - D'Atra Hicks (2001)
  - Kitra Williams-White
- Curtis Blake as Charles McCarter
- Dexter Hamlett as Orlando
  - Samson Logan (2001)
- Regina Gibbs as Myrtle Miller
  - Tamela Mann (2001)
- Tunja Robinson as Brenda
- Regina McCrary as Angelo
- Ty London as Willie

== The Band ==
- Elvin Ross - Musical Director
- Mike Frazier - Bass
- Erick Morgan - Drums
- John Forbes - Keyboards
- Jim Gorst - Sound
- Davie Holmbo - Sound

== Musical Numbers ==
All songs written and/or produced by Tyler Perry and Elvin D. Ross.

=== Act One ===
- "Overture" - Band
- "Dear Diary I" - Helen
- "Only Believe" - Myrtle
- "A Man's Gotta Do" - Charles
- "How Bill Died" - Daddy Charles, Angelo, Willie
- "Getting Old Blues" - Willie, Angelo, and Daddy Charles
- "Dear Diary II" - Helen
- "Bearilla" - Daddy Charles, Helen
- "Cold" - Helen

=== Act Two ===
- "Rosa Stole My Man" - Madea, Helen
- "Can't Turn Around" - Myrtle
- "Dear Diary III" - Helen
- "Ain't It Funny" - Helen
- "Peace Be Still" - Madea, Myrtle, Helen
- "Dear Diary IV" - Helen
- "Father Can You Hear Me" - Helen, Charles, Myrtle, and Company

== Trivia ==
- Kitra Williams-White understudied the role of Helen, and also sang her parts on the play's soundtrack.
- The character, Myrtle, was originally introduced offscreen in the previous play, I Can Do Bad All By Myself. She calls and prays for Madea while she is sick.
- D'Atra Hicks and Tamela Mann would replace Marva King and Regina Gibbs, respectively, as Helen and Myrtle early on in the show's run.
- Samson Logan would also assume the role of Orlando later on in the show's run.
- On certain nights, the show would end with Helen leaving Charles for good.
- Madea originally wasn't in the show. She only appeared in the play "I Can Do Bad All By Myself". Tyler Perry only planned on playing Daddy Charles. But since audiences wanted to see more of the grandma character, Tyler added her into the show. First as an alternate performance, then for the main show.
- October 2002 Tyler will play Daddy Charles and Madea in "Diary of a Mad Black Woman" in Los Angeles at the Wilshire Ebell on October 2nd and 3rd..

== Controversy ==
In early 2008, playwright Donna West filed suit against Perry, contending that he stole material from her 1991 play, Fantasy of a Black Woman. Veronica Lewis, Perry's attorney, said there was no need for her client to appropriate the work of others.

On December 9, 2008, the case was tried before Judge Leonard Davis in the United States District Court for the Eastern District of Texas. The jury returned an 8–0 verdict in favor of Perry.

== Film adaptation ==
The stage play was adapted into a motion picture by Lions Gate Entertainment and BET Pictures, and opened on February 25, 2005. The film version of Diary of a Mad Black Woman stars Kimberly Elise, Steve Harris, Shemar Moore, Cicely Tyson and Tyler Perry. In the movie, Helen and Charles have been married for eighteen years, rather than twenty years as in the play.
