= Ryan Gentles =

Ryan Gentles may refer to:

- Ryan Gentles (music manager)
- Ryan Gentles (actor)
