= Madea Goes to Jail (play) =

Play written by Tyler Perry

- Original language: English
- Written by: Tyler Perry
- Characters: Madea, Ella, Sonny, Vanessa, Wanda, Katie, Toni, Jeremy, Leo, Nate, Pete, Chico
- Genre: Comedy-Drama
- Setting: Madea's House; Jailhouse

Premiere
- Date: January 3, 2005
- Place: Phoenix
- Official website

Madea Goes to Jail is a 2005 American stage play that was written, produced, and directed by Tyler Perry in 2005. It stars Tyler Perry as Mabel "Madea" Simmons and Cassi Davis as Ella Kincaid. The live performance released on DVD on June 27, 2006 was recorded live in Atlanta at the Fabulous Fox Theatre in October 2005. The DVD was released alongside Why Did I Get Married? and Madea's Family Reunion.

== Plot ==
Vanessa Andrews, an aspiring business student stressed over school, struggles to finish her latest class assignment while refusing to attend to her infant son, Sonny Jr., or help her husband and Madea's nephew, Sonny Andrews Sr., get ready for work. Sonny works at a prison to both pay for Vanessa's schooling and to support their son. Ella Kincaid, Madea's best friend and next-door neighbor, enters the house asking for Madea, who is absent. Unbeknownst to everyone, Madea has been arrested in Conyers for refusing to pay for gas and is currently in custody at the same prison where Sonny works. Ella and Vanessa then argue over the latter's ambivalence over the needs of her husband and child, and refusal to do her part as a wife and mother, given that Sonny is working hard to pay for her education among other things. Nate, Sonny's boss and friend, comes to the house to drive him to work. As he waits, Sonny tries to placate Vanessa, promising her some love and affection after he returns home. He leaves with Nate, and Ella takes a phone call and learns that Madea is in jail.

Later, at the jail, Sonny runs into his long-time friend, Wanda, who is now an Assistant District Attorney. After catching up briefly, Wanda leaves and Sonny's co-worker Leo and Madea enter and accuse each other of giving the other a hard time. Madea tells Sonny about how she got arrested and asks him to go home to fetch bail money. She then meets and butts heads with Chico, a hardened inmate who is later revealed to have three sons (one in jail, one "strung out", and one dead) and gets acquainted with Katie, who has been in jail for nine years for non-fatally stabbing her pimp ex-husband Pete after catching him molesting their daughter Toni, who has been continuously bounced from one foster home to another ever since. Toni comes to visit and is shown to have a very nasty attitude from her experiences in the foster system, and soon makes the mistake of turning it onto Madea. After a short confrontation, Toni leaves, and later, the prisoners are forced to turn in for the night. During this time, Madea and Chico are placed together and the two quickly get into a fight over the cell's bunks, which Madea wins.

The next day, Madea meets Jeremy Tucker, her probation officer & the prison chaplain, who explains the terms of her probation. Soon after that, Katie's ex-husband Pete arrives and threatens to go after Toni again as revenge for Katie stabbing him, which Madea witnesses. This inspires Madea, after making bail, to take care of Toni until Katie gets out of jail. Sometime after returning home, Madea notices a strange scent on Vanessa's clothes and bedsheets while doing the laundry. Ella then stops by, and Madea reveals that Toni has been giving her a hard time since her arrival. When Toni comes down dressed in skimpy clothes, refuses to go to school, ignores the women, and gives them attitude, Madea spanks her with a belt and forces her to go back upstairs and change. Leo and Sonny arrive, and Madea complains about Vanessa's trifling and lazy behavior. Vanessa overhears and gets smart with Madea, nearly coming to blows with her as a result, and reveals that she has a job interview the following day. Leo then leaves with Ella, while Sonny receives food from Madea and leaves with her and Toni, and Vanessa then slips off to parts unknown.

Some days later, Sonny forgets his keys and returns home to pick them up. Vanessa tries to get him to leave quickly, revealing that she is about to give their son a bath upstairs, though she assures him that she has not run the water yet. The two then get into an argument over what to do once Vanessa gets a job, with her selfishly refusing to take over Sonny's responsibilities so that he can return to school and finish his classes. After Sonny leaves, Nate emerges from hiding, revealing that he and Vanessa have been having an affair. As they start to make out in the bedroom, Nate suddenly hears water running in the bathroom, and they both run inside and discover the baby has had a horrific accident and is about to drown. They quickly call 9-1-1 and rush the child to the hospital.

Later, Madea is fuming over the baby's accident. Then, when Vanessa, Sonny, and Nate come in from the emergency room, Madea and Ella smell the same scent on Nate that was on Vanessa's clothes and bedsheets. After confirming this, Madea tries to get Sonny to realize what's going on. When he does not, Madea tells Vanessa to admit to her affair with Nate. The two viciously argue, with Sonny defending his wife. Wanda enters and informs them that she has just met with the Child Protective Agency about the baby and that he needs a blood transfusion, but reveals that Sonny is not a match and therefore, is not the child's biological father. Vanessa protests this and tries to assure Sonny that he is the father, but he, finally realizing his wife's infidelity, angrily demands the truth. Nate then admits to his affair with Vanessa and that he is likely the father, nearly causing Sonny to attack him. Nate and Vanessa try to appeal to and apologize to Sonny, but Madea orders the two to leave and chases them out of the house with a gun when Nate attempts to confront her. Madea and Ella then chase after them, and a distraught Sonny retreats to his son's room, much to Wanda's sadness.

Some days later, Sonny, Toni, and Wanda come back from church, with Sonny planning to return to work to take his mind off everything. Wanda informs him that Sonny Jr. is recovering, but then reveals that Nate is not the child's father either and went crazy against Vanessa when he found out; Vanessa was subsequently forced to take out a restraining order against him and is now in jail after being charged with child endangerment. After learning that Vanessa gave up her parental rights and that the baby will be put into foster care, Sonny expresses his desire to adopt and raise the child. The next day, at the prison, Vanessa attempts to weasel her way back into Sonny's good graces to get bail so she can keep her job, but fails and is forced to sign his divorce papers. As Sonny meets with Jeremy, Nate arrives, and after brushing off Vanessa out of anger and disgust, gives Sonny more jobs (working four back-to-back doubles). When Sonny cops an attitude with him over this, Nate retaliates by having him transferred to the F-Unit, where all the hardened convicts reside, telling him to quit if he does not like it. Jeremy intervenes and decides to help Sonny by talking to the warden, while also scheduling Toni to pay a visit to Katie. Also, Katie persuades Chico to turn her life over to God to make a brand new life for herself after her release.

The next day, Nate arrives and almost ends up in another confrontation with Sonny over a complaint filed to the warden, before Leo breaks it up. Jeremy then reveals that he filed the complaint and that he recommended Nate for the position in the F-Unit. Nate begrudgingly takes the position and finds out that Sonny has his job now, at which point he leaves. Leo becomes jealous that Sonny is now his boss and temporarily denounces their friendship until Ella sets him straight. Wanda arrives and Sonny reveals he is in love with her; while unsure of how she feels, but decides to give things a try. Madea arrives with Toni to visit Katie as Ella, Sonny, and Wanda leave. Toni properly greets her mother, leaving Katie very pleased with the change in her daughter's attitude. Madea then persuades Katie to tell Toni the truth about how she ended up incarcerated and subsequently exits. Katie prepares to tell her daughter the truth, but an upset Toni refuses to believe her and runs out of jail.

Later, at home, Sonny is depressed over his breakup with Vanessa, upset that he could not get her to change her ways. Madea says that someone like her could never change and instructs him to start paying attention to things better and to move on after he finishes grieving. Ella, Wanda, Leo, and Jeremy arrive and soon everyone sings musical numbers to try and cheer Sonny up. After this, Wanda reveals that Leo, is in fact, the father of Vanessa's baby. Upon hearing this, Leo immediately runs out of the house, and Ella, livid at the news, pursues him with a knife in hand, thus proving that he was no more of a friend to Sonny than Nate was. Sonny and Wanda then share a kiss as Madea goes upstairs to Toni's room. After overhearing Toni having a strongly suggestive conversation with a 16-year-old boy, Madea takes the phone and speaks to the boy and, after learning about how young all of his family has had children, she advises Toni not to talk to him anymore. She spends some time with Toni, giving her advice about being what she wants to be and not caring about others' opinions of her, and giving Toni her interpretations of the Bible. Toni reveals that she does not know how to pray and later asks Jeremy to teach her about prayer, at which he agrees.

The next day, Toni is confronted by her father, who aims to molest her again, but Madea and Ella arrive just in time to save her and chase him out of the house. Shortly afterwards, Wanda, Sonny, and the now-released Katie then enter, and Katie reveals that she is ready to take Toni back. Toni wants to stay with Madea, but Katie's powerful declaration of her love for her daughter changes her mind. Toni gathers her things, says goodbye to Madea, Ella, Sonny, and Wanda, with the latter two finally an official couple, before leaving with her mother.

== Tour dates ==
Scheduled shows
Date	City	Venue
January 3, 2005	Phoenix	Dodge Theatre
January 4, 2005	Phoenix	Dodge Theatre
January 6, 2005	Hollywood	Kodak Theatre
January 7, 2005	Hollywood	Kodak Theatre
January 8, 2005	Hollywood	Kodak Theatre
January 9, 2005	Hollywood	Kodak Theatre
January 11, 2005	Sacramento	Sacramento Memorial Auditorium
January 12, 2005	Sacramento	Sacramento Memorial Auditorium
January 13, 2005	Oakland	Paramount Theatre
January 14, 2005	Oakland	Paramount Theatre
January 15, 2005	Oakland	Paramount Theatre
January 16, 2005	Oakland	Paramount Theatre
January 18, 2005	Las Vegas	Cashman Theatre
January 19, 2005	Las Vegas	Cashman Theatre
January 21, 2005	Seattle	Paramount Theatre
January 22, 2005	Seattle	Paramount Theatre
January 23, 2005	Seattle	Paramount Theatre
January 25, 2005	San Diego	San Diego Sports Arena
January 26, 2005	San Diego	San Diego Sports Arena
January 27, 2005	Hollywood	Kodak Theatre
January 28, 2005	Hollywood	Kodak Theatre
January 29, 2005	Hollywood	Kodak Theatre
January 30, 2005	Hollywood	Kodak Theatre
February 2, 2005	Memphis	Orpheum Theatre
February 3, 2005	Memphis	Orpheum Theatre
February 4, 2005	Memphis	Orpheum Theatre
February 5, 2005	Memphis	Orpheum Theatre
February 6, 2005	Memphis	Orpheum Theatre
February 8, 2005	Winston-Salem	Joel Coliseum
February 9, 2005	Winston-Salem	Joel Coliseum
February 10, 2005	Columbia	Township Auditorium
February 11, 2005	Columbia	Township Auditorium
February 12, 2005	Columbia	Township Auditorium
February 13, 2005	Columbia	Township Auditorium
February 15, 2005	New Orleans	Saenger Theatre
February 16, 2005	New Orleans	Saenger Theatre
February 17, 2005	New Orleans	Saenger Theatre
February 18, 2005	New Orleans	Saenger Theatre
February 19, 2005	New Orleans	Saenger Theatre
February 20, 2005	New Orleans	Saenger Theatre
February 22, 2005	Newark	Newark Symphony Hall
February 23, 2005	Newark	Newark Symphony Hall
February 24, 2005	Newark	Newark Symphony Hall
February 25, 2005	Newark	Newark Symphony Hall
February 26, 2005	Newark	Newark Symphony Hall
February 27, 2005	Newark	Newark Symphony Hall
March 1, 2005	New York	Beacon Theatre
March 2, 2005	New York	Beacon Theatre
March 3, 2005	New York	Beacon Theatre
March 4, 2005	New York	Beacon Theatre
March 5, 2005	New York	Beacon Theatre
March 6, 2005	New York	Beacon Theatre
March 8, 2005	Chicago	Arie Crown Theater
March 9, 2005	Chicago	Arie Crown Theater
March 10, 2005	Chicago	Arie Crown Theater
March 11, 2005	Chicago	Arie Crown Theater
March 12, 2005	Chicago	Arie Crown Theater
March 13, 2005	Chicago	Arie Crown Theater
March 15, 2005	Chicago	Arie Crown Theater
March 16, 2005	Chicago	Arie Crown Theater
March 17, 2005	Chicago	Arie Crown Theater
March 18, 2005	Chicago	Arie Crown Theater
March 19, 2005	Chicago	Arie Crown Theater
March 22, 2005	Houston	Brown Theater
March 23, 2005	Houston	Brown Theater
March 24, 2005	Houston	Brown Theater
March 25, 2005	Houston	Brown Theater
March 26, 2005	Houston	Brown Theater
March 27, 2005	Houston	Brown Theater
March 29, 2005	Detroit	Fox Theatre
March 30, 2005	Detroit	Fox Theatre
March 31, 2005	Detroit	Fox Theatre
April 1, 2005	Detroit	Fox Theatre
April 2, 2005	Detroit	Fox Theatre
April 3, 2005	Detroit	Fox Theatre
April 5, 2005	Chicago	Arie Crown Theater
April 6, 2005	Chicago	Arie Crown Theater
April 7, 2005	Chicago	Arie Crown Theater
April 9, 2005	Chicago	Arie Crown Theater
April 10, 2005	Chicago	Arie Crown Theater
April 12, 2005	Greenville	Bi-Lo Center
April 13, 2005	Greenville	Bi-Lo Center
April 15, 2005	Hampton	Hampton Coliseum
April 16, 2005	Hampton	Hampton Coliseum
April 17, 2005	Hampton	Hampton Coliseum
April 26, 2005	Atlanta	Fabulous Fox Theatre
April 27, 2005	Atlanta	Fabulous Fox Theatre
April 28, 2005	Atlanta	Fabulous Fox Theatre
April 29, 2005	Atlanta	Fabulous Fox Theatre
April 30, 2005	Atlanta	Fabulous Fox Theatre
May 1, 2005	Atlanta	Fabulous Fox Theatre
May 3, 2005	New York	Beacon Theatre
May 4, 2005	New York	Beacon Theatre
May 5, 2005	New York	Beacon Theatre
May 6, 2005	New York	Beacon Theatre
May 7, 2005	New York	Beacon Theatre
May 8, 2005	New York	Beacon Theatre
May 19, 2005	Newark	Newark Symphony Hall
May 20, 2005	Newark	Newark Symphony Hall
May 21, 2005	Newark	Newark Symphony Hall
May 22, 2005	Newark	Newark Symphony Hall
May 24, 2005	Washington, D.C.	DAR Constitution Hall
May 25, 2005	Washington, D.C.	DAR Constitution Hall
May 26, 2005	Washington, D.C.	DAR Constitution Hall
May 27, 2005	Washington, D.C.	DAR Constitution Hall
May 28, 2005	Washington, D.C.	DAR Constitution Hall
May 29, 2005	Washington, D.C.	DAR Constitution Hall
June 16, 2005	Detroit	Fox Theatre
June 17, 2005	Detroit	Fox Theatre
June 18, 2005	Detroit	Fox Theatre
June 19, 2005	Detroit	Fox Theatre
June 21, 2005	Baltimore	Morgan State University
June 22, 2005	Baltimore	Morgan State University
June 23, 2005	Baltimore	Morgan State University
June 24, 2005	Baltimore	Morgan State University
June 25, 2005	Baltimore	Morgan State University
June 26, 2005	Baltimore	Morgan State University
September 27, 2005	Saginaw	Dow Event Center
September 28, 2005	Saginaw	Dow Event Center
September 30, 2005	Cincinnati	Cintas Center
October 1, 2005	Cincinnati	Cintas Center
October 2, 2005	Cincinnati	Cintas Center
October 4, 2005	Atlanta	Fabulous Fox Theatre
October 5, 2005	Atlanta	Fabulous Fox Theatre
October 6, 2005	Atlanta	Fabulous Fox Theatre
October 7, 2005	Atlanta	Fabulous Fox Theatre
October 8, 2005	Atlanta	Fabulous Fox Theatre
October 9, 2005	Atlanta	Fabulous Fox Theatre
October 11, 2005	Miami	James L. Knight Center
October 12, 2005	Miami	James L. Knight Center
October 13, 2005	Miami	James L. Knight Center
October 14, 2005	Miami	James L. Knight Center
October 15, 2005	Miami	James L. Knight Center
October 16, 2005	Miami	James L. Knight Center
October 25, 2005	Fayetteville	Crown Center of Cumberland County
October 26, 2005	Fayetteville	Crown Center of Cumberland County
October 27, 2005	Charlotte	Cricket Arena
October 28, 2005	Charlotte	Cricket Arena
October 29, 2005	Charlotte	Cricket Arena
October 30, 2005	Charlotte	Cricket Arena
November 2, 2005	Memphis	Orpheum Theatre
November 3, 2005	Memphis	Orpheum Theatre
November 4, 2005	Memphis	Orpheum Theatre
November 5, 2005	Memphis	Orpheum Theatre
November 6, 2005	Memphis	Orpheum Theatre
November 8, 2005	Grand Rapids	Van Andel Arena
November 10, 2005	Milwaukee	Milwaukee Theatre
November 11, 2005	Milwaukee	Milwaukee Theatre
November 12, 2005	Milwaukee	Milwaukee Theatre
November 13, 2005	Milwaukee	Milwaukee Theatre
November 15, 2005	Raleigh	RBC Center
November 16, 2005	Raleigh	RBC Center
November 22, 2005	Columbus	Columbus Civic Center
November 23, 2005	Columbus	Columbus Civic Center
November 24, 2005	Birmingham	BJCC Concert Hall
November 25, 2005	Birmingham	BJCC Concert Hall
November 26, 2005	Birmingham	BJCC Concert Hall
November 27, 2005	Birmingham	BJCC Concert Hall
November 29, 2005	Louisville	Louisville Gardens
November 30, 2005	Louisville	Louisville Gardens
December 2, 2005	Nashville	Nashville Municipal Auditorium
December 3, 2005	Nashville	Nashville Municipal Auditorium
December 4, 2005	Nashville	Nashville Municipal Auditorium
January 3, 2006	Portland	Rose Garden
January 5, 2006	Oakland	Paramount Theatre
January 6, 2006	Oakland	Paramount Theatre
January 7, 2006	Oakland	Paramount Theatre
January 8, 2006	Oakland	Paramount Theatre
January 10, 2006	Phoenix	Dodge Theatre
January 11, 2006	Phoenix	Dodge Theatre
January 12, 2006	Hollywood	Kodak Theatre
January 13, 2006	Hollywood	Kodak Theatre
January 14, 2006	Hollywood	Kodak Theatre
January 15, 2006	Hollywood	Kodak Theatre
January 24, 2006	Washington, D.C.	DAR Constitution Hall
January 25, 2006	Washington, D.C.	DAR Constitution Hall
January 26, 2006	Washington, D.C.	DAR Constitution Hall
January 27, 2006	Washington, D.C.	DAR Constitution Hall
January 28, 2006	Washington, D.C.	DAR Constitution Hall
January 29, 2006	Washington, D.C.	DAR Constitution Hall
February 7, 2006	Charleston	North Charleston Coliseum
February 8, 2006	Charleston	North Charleston Coliseum
February 10, 2006	Columbia	Township Auditorium
February 11, 2006	Columbia	Township Auditorium
February 12, 2006	Florence	Florence Civic Center
February 27, 2006	Peoria	Peoria Civic Center
March 2, 2006	Indianapolis	Murat Theatre
March 3, 2006	Indianapolis	Murat Theatre
March 4, 2006	Indianapolis	Murat Theatre
March 5, 2006	Indianapolis	Murat Theatre
March 9, 2006	Dallas	Music Hall at Fair Park
March 10, 2006	Dallas	Music Hall at Fair Park
March 11, 2006	Dallas	Music Hall at Fair Park
March 12, 2006	Dallas	Music Hall at Fair Park
March 31, 2006	Jackson	Mississippi Coliseum
April 1, 2006	Jackson	Mississippi Coliseum
April 2, 2006	Jackson	Mississippi Coliseum
April 7, 2006	Wallingford	Chevrolet Theatre
April 8, 2006	Wallingford	Chevrolet Theatre
April 9, 2006	Wallingford	Chevrolet Theatre
April 18, 2006	Pittsburgh	Petersen Events Center
April 19, 2006	Pittsburgh	Petersen Events Center
April 21, 2006	Worcester	DCU Center
April 22, 2006	Worcester	DCU Center
April 23, 2006	Worcester	DCU Center
April 25, 2006	Tampa	USF Sun Dome
April 27, 2006	Jacksonville	Times-Union Center for the Performing Arts
April 28, 2006	Jacksonville	Times-Union Center for the Performing Arts
April 29, 2006	Jacksonville	Times-Union Center for the Performing Arts
April 30, 2006	Jacksonville	Times-Union Center for the Performing Arts
May 2, 2006	Columbus	Nationwide Arena
May 4, 2006	Minneapolis	Orpheum Theatre
May 5, 2006	Minneapolis	Orpheum Theatre
May 6, 2006	Minneapolis	Orpheum Theatre
May 7, 2006	Minneapolis	Orpheum Theatre
May 9, 2006	New York	Beacon Theatre
May 10, 2006	New York	Beacon Theatre
May 11, 2006	New York	Beacon Theatre
May 12, 2006	New York	Beacon Theatre
May 13, 2006	New York	Beacon Theatre
May 14, 2006	New York	Beacon Theatre

== Cast ==
=== Original Cast ===
- Tyler Perry as Mabel "Madea" Simmons
- Cassi Davis as Ella Kincaid
- Christian Keyes as Sonny Andrews
- BJ Crosby as Katie
- Cheryl Pepsii Riley as Wanda Simmons-Andrews
- Ryan Gentles as Nate
- LaVan Davis as Leo
- Brian Hurst as Jeremy Tucker
- Donna Stewart as Vanessa Andrews
- Anndretta Lyle as Toni
- Crystal "Chrissy" Collins as Chico
- Ron Andrews as Pete

=== DVD Cast ===
- Tyler Perry as Mabel "Madea" Simmons
- Christian Keyes as Sonny Andrews
- Cassi Davis as Ella Kincaid
- LaVan Davis as Leo
- Cheryl Pepsii Riley as Wanda Simmons-Andrews
- Judy Peterson as Katie
- Chantell Christopher as Vanessa Andrews
- Brian Hurst as Jeremy Tucker
- Anndretta Lyle as Toni
- Ryan Gentles as Nate
- Ron Andrews as Pete
- Crystal "Crissy" Collins as Chico

== The Band ==
- Ronnie Garrett - Musical Director / Bass Guitar
- Earl Flemming - Keyboards
- Anthony Lockett - Guitar
- Marcus Williams - Drums
- Michael Burton - Saxophone / Keyboards

== Musical Numbers ==
- "How Does That Feel?" – Ella
- "Wait Till I Get Home Tonight" – Sonny
- "Down on My Luck" – Katie, Leo, and Chico
- "We Need a Word" – Wanda
- "Whaddaya Know About Jesus?" – Ella, Wanda, Leo, and Sonny
- "Jesus Loves Me" – Chico and Katie
- "Ain't No Sunshine" – Sonny and Madea
- Medley
1. "Going in Circles" – Madea
2. "Love Don't Love Nobody" – Madea
3. "Cause I Love You" (ad-lib) – Madea
4. "Clean Up Woman" – Ella
5. "Sweet Thing (Rufus song)" – Wanda
6. "Let's Get It On" – Leo
7. "Before I Let Go" – Jeremy
- "His Name Is Jesus" – Jeremy
- "I Want to Be Free" – Katie

== Film adaptation ==
A film adaptation of the same name was released on February 20, 2009.

== Past productions ==
- Cheryl Pepsii Riley starred in numerous Tyler Perry plays and the film Diary of a Mad Black Woman.
- Cassi Davis and Lavan Davis was in Daddy's Little Girls and currently is in the sitcom Tyler Perry's House of Payne
