= I Can Do Bad All by Myself (film) =

- Theatrical release poster
- Directed by: Tyler Perry
- Screenplay by: Tyler Perry
- Based on: I Can Do Bad All By Myself by Tyler Perry
- Produced by: Tyler Perry; Reuben Cannon
- Starring: Taraji P. Henson; Adam Rodriguez; Brian White; Mary J. Blige; Gladys Knight; Marvin L. Winans; Tyler Perry
- Cinematography: Alexander Gruszynski
- Edited by: Maysie Hoy
- Music by: Aaron Zigman
- Production company: Tyler Perry Studios
- Distributed by: Lionsgate
- Release date: September 11, 2009
- Running time: 113 minutes
- Country: United States
- Language: English
- Budget: $19 million
- Box office: $51.7 million

I Can Do Bad All by Myself is a 2009 American romantic musical comedy-drama film which was released on September 11, 2009. The film was directed, produced, and written by Tyler Perry, who also makes an appearance in the film as his signature character Madea. The rest of the cast consists of Taraji P. Henson, Adam Rodriguez, Brian White, Mary J. Blige, Gladys Knight, and Marvin L. Winans. Although the film and play share the same title, the film is not an adaptation of Perry's play of the same name, the two works have different storylines. Both are named for a lyric in the Changing Faces song "G.H.E.T.T.O.U.T.". The film adaptation tells the story of an alcoholic nightclub singer being ordered to confront her actions, after being prompted to take in her estranged niece and nephews. It is the fifth film in the Madea cinematic universe. I Can Do Bad All by Myself received generally mixed reviews from critics.

== Plot ==
April is a nightclub singer of Club Indigo. On one night of the nightclub shift, Madea and Joe Simmons notices Jennifer, Manny, and Byron breaking into their house, in which Jennifer accidentally drops and breaks the VCR, Joe owned. The grandmother of the children is reported to have the children to reside with her, coinciding the period of their mother being dead. Their grandmother, however, had been missing for reportedly, four days.

April gathers alcoholic beverages, while questioning the location of her boyfriend Randy, with the question irritating Tanya, the bartender of the nightclub. April arrives to her residence with Randy, who have another residence with his wife and children, in which April openly permits. The next day, Madea brings the children to April, in which April is revealed to be their estranged aunt. Sandino, a Colombian immigrant and Handyman, is sent to reside and work for April, after arriving as a targeted-guest to the church missionary work, done under Pastor Brian and Wilma.

April tells of how her sister died from drugs, after Pastor Brian had alerted the occurrence of Jennifer escaping the nearby drugstore with stolen needles. Pastor Brian also reveals of how the grandmother of the children is seemingly aging and is becoming notably weak. April orders Sandino to reside in her basement, and to have facial makeover, in a partially jokingly manner. The needles are revealed to be for Manny, who have potentially life-threatening diabetes. Randy arrives, and heckles Sandino for being unexpectedly present, and proceeds in making advancements to Jennifer, after intervening to verbally discipline Jennifer, to express proper manners, after she was arguing with April, and when she aggressively responded back to Randy.

The children visit Madea, to clean the house. It is a totally separate day, where Pastor Brian and Wilma announces to April; her mother Rose had died from a brain aneurysm on a city bus. Rose was dead for approximately one week, resulting in her cremation, which occurred before she was claimed. April receives the urn, and she attempts to hug Randy to his backside, in attempt of comfort. Randy was sleeping and he shrugs her off, since the couple were already awoken by Sandino with construction noise. Subsequently, April eventually goes to Sandino for comfort, in which, April tells of her strained relationship with her sister and mother.

Jennifer tells Madea about her finding out of her grandmother being dead and the potential impacts on her brothers. She asks about prayer, which she said is one of the topics her grandmother heavily spoke of. Madea attempts to instruct her, but subsequently also chooses to give incoherent stories in the Bible.

Later during the same night, Tanya calls out April of being a regular alcoholic, and also only allowing Randy for certain periods of time, while actually using Randy for her own advantage with money and conditional security. April is eventually in a "love-triangle," with Randy and Sandino. One day, April goes on a date with Sandino, where it is explicitly claimed that April uses Randy for transaction. Upon arriving to the residence, Sandino revealed that he had been renovating a bedroom for the children. Manny and Byron expresses their glee of the completed bedroom, but Jennifer orders her brothers to leave the bedroom, while expressing how April still does not allow them to be welcomed. One Sunday morning, Sandino knocks on the door of the bedroom, April and Randy use. Randy calls out Sandino for knocking on the door, while inviting April to attend the ongoing church service. Randy gives a death threat to Sandino, before April attempts to calmly tells Randy of her choice to attend the church service that she subsequently visits with Sandino.

It is later during the same night after the church service; in which Jennifer goes to the kitchen to get the insulin shot for Manny. Jennifer accidentally stumbles upon Randy at the table, in which Randy accuses Jennifer of consistently giving him suggestive glances to him. Randy continues to follow Jennifer to the refrigerator, and he attempts to be in conversation, before he tries to rape her at the sink counter. Sandino quickly hits Randy to his head, with a board of construction wood. Sandino also uses this opportunity to use other fighting methods, to express his vengeance to Randy for the other previous actions. April arrives to the scene and reacts in fear, as she orders Sandino to stop. Sandino comforts a sobbing Jennifer, and tries to bound her from revenging Randy, in which Randy frantically claims that Jennifer offered him sex for money, while Jennifer and Sandino are attempting to tell what they experienced. Upon being asked on who is to be believed, April expresses that she believes Randy, and encourages go in the bathtub water, in response to the effects from the fight. Jennifer sobbingly refutes the claim that Randy gave, with April frantically staring at the reaction Jennifer gave, before April enters into the upstairs bathroom. Randy refutes the occurrence while in the bathtub, before April leaves and returns with a radio; plugging it up and using this to threaten Randy with electrocution. Randy continues to repeat the refutes, in which April aligns the radio closer to the bathtub water, each time the refutes are exclaimed. April reveals the occurrence of having a similar experience under Lee, who is presumably the boyfriend of her mother, in which April was framed in front of her mother as being the one who requested the act. Sandino, alongside Byron and Manny are comforting a sobbing Jennifer, in which Byron and Manny have already been awoken. Sandino hears the arguing and enters into the scene, where he hears the repeat of the occurrence details that April gave. April mocks Sandino, who calmly attempts to forbid her from trying to kill Randy. April subsequently drops the radio into the water, with the radio short circuiting, which results in smokes and flashes, alongside it floating in the waves of the bathwater. Randy collapses onto the floor after trying to escape the tub, while the short circuiting also causes the ceiling lights to flash. April notices Randy, and leaves after being alarmed of the scene. Sandino also notices Randy, but orders him to get his belongings and diverge his presence from the house.

April is drinking inside the nightclub, and expresses guilt of not being aware of the signs, comparing it to her mother not being aware of the previous occurrence. Sandino arrives, and April continues to express her guilt. April also expresses her guilt in the electrocution, with her asking Sandino on why he let Randy be in his condition while being alone in the setting. Sandino reveals how he took the keys, and still found his way to have Randy to be removed from the residence. April realizes of how Sandino is attentive to her niece and nephews, in which she uses the claim to accuse Sandino of being a child molester. While exiting the nightclub, Sandino explicitly exclaims to April of her overall seemingly-mentally ill persona, and tells his backstory of being a child laborer and explains that the predicament of Jennifer and her brothers, triggers his trauma. Sandino bumps his shoulder onto April, and diverges his presence from her.

April tells Jennifer that she understood the facial expression given, which happened when Jennifer attempted to refute the claims. April apologizes to Jennifer for her resentment and officially welcomes her and brothers to be in her residence. During a separate day, Sandino announces to the children, on his departure from April, after their argument. Later that day, Jennifer tells the incoherent Bible stories, given by Madea, using it to encourage April to recognize Sandino as being needed. Periods later, Sandino returns, with April subtly expressing her romantic love to him. Sandino is skeptical, but eventually tells April, of how she should love herself and love others properly. The pair exchange kisses.

Periods later, April and Sandino gets married, with the subsequent block party for their reception.

== Cast ==
- Taraji P. Henson as April, an alcoholic nightclub singer of Club Indigo; Cheryl Pepsii Riley does singing overdubs for April.
- Adam Rodriguez as Sandino Ramirez, a Colombian immigrant who is a residing-handyman for April
- Brian White as Randy, April's "already"-married boyfriend, in which April uses for transaction and "occasional" security
- Mary J. Blige as Tanya, a bartender at Club Indigo
- Gladys Knight as Wilma, a member of the church establishment located near the residence of April
- Marvin L. Winans as Pastor Brian, the pastor of the church establishment near the residence of April
- Hope Olaidé Wilson as Jennifer, the niece of April who is the oldest of the three siblings and was the essential guardian of her siblings
- Freddy Siglar as Byron, the nephew of April
- Kwesi Boakye as Manny, the nephew of April
- Tyler Perry as:
  - Mabel "Madea" Simmons, a tough old lady
  - Joe Simmons, the brother of Madea
- Eric Mendenhall as Man #1
- David Paulus as Miller
- Randall Taylor as Mr. Bradley
- Tess Malis Kincaid as Ms. Sullivan
- Joseph Taylor as Announcer
- Cheryl B. Pratt as 911 Dispatcher

== Soundtrack ==
The film features 13 songs, including two new songs by Blige. Perry was not able to produce a soundtrack album for the film due to the various record companies involved.

- "Good Woman Down" (Robert F. Aries, Mary J. Blige, Sean Garrett, Freddie Jackson, Meli'sa Morgan) – Blige
- "I Can Do Bad" (Blige, Chuck Harmony, Shaffer Smith) – Blige
- "Playboy" (Michael Akinlabi, Tasha Schumann) – Candy Coated Killahz
- "Contagious" (Xavier Dphrepaulezz) – Chocolate Butterfly
- "H.D.Y." (Ronnie Garrett, Herman (Pnut) Johnson) – Club Indigo Band
- "Indigo Blues" (Garrett, Johnson) – Club Indigo Band
- "Lovers Heat" (Garrett, Johnson) – Club Indigo Band
- "Tears of Pain" (Foster) – Ruthie Foster
- "Rock Steady" (Aretha Franklin) – Cheryl Pepsii Riley
- "The Need to Be" (Jim Weatherly) – Gladys Knight
- "Just Don't Wanna Know/Over It Now" (Marvin L. Winans) – Knight and Winans
- "Oh Lord I Want You to Help Me" (Traditional, arranged by Jerome Chambers and Edward O'Neal) – Riley and Winans

== Reception ==
=== Critical response ===
I Can Do Bad All by Myself received mixed reviews from critics, becoming his most acclaimed film, until 2021's A Jazzman's Blues. Rotten Tomatoes gave it a 61% approval rating based on 44 reviews, with an average rating of 5.9/10. The site's consensus states: "Though somewhat formulaic and predictable, Perry succeeds in mixing broad humor with sincere sentimentality to palatable effect." Metacritic reported that the film has a score of 55 out of 100 based on 13 critics, indicating "mixed or average" reviews. Audiences polled by CinemaScore gave the film an average grade of "A" on an A+ to F scale.

Entertainment Weekly's Lisa Schwarzbaum gave the movie an "A−" grade, saying, "After a summer of phony, pasty rom-coms, do this: See a movie where old-fashioned notions of love, faith, strength, and the possibility of redemption are taken seriously." Ty Burr of The Boston Globe called the film "overlong but well-shaped and involving", praising Perry for finding a balanced mix of "earnest soap opera moralism with [his] comic instincts", calling it his "most confident and competent mixture of uplifting black middle-class melodrama and low-down comedy." Cliff Doerksen of the Chicago Reader said about the film: "Contrived, sentimental, tonally bipolar, and as predictable as clockwork, this latest from chitlin' circuit impresario Tyler Perry is just a fat slab of ecstatic entertainment."

Rob Humanick of Slant Magazine felt the film was a great gateway for people not familiar with the "scabrous antics and homegrown moralizing" delivered by the Madea character, saying that Perry lends his creation a more "greater level[s] of tonal consistency" than his previously contradictory Madea Goes to Jail, writing that "I Can Do Bad acknowledges Madea's flaws with loving scrutiny, and doesn't require approval of her more selfish attributes."

Randy Cordova of The Arizona Republic was critical of Perry's filmmaking for delivering lengthy musical numbers and overlooked story elements but gave praise to the performances of Henson and Wilson for showcasing his ability to "create meaty roles for women." The A.V. Club's Nathan Rabin gave the film a "B−" grade, praising Henson's performance and the "riveting musical numbers" by Knight and Blige for emitting more "feverish emotions" to the film than Perry's "characteristically ham-fisted screenplay", concluding that "His oeuvre has always been shameless and over the top, but Bad might just be the first of Perry’s films to border on operatic." Kimberley Jones of The Austin Chronicle criticized Perry for prolonging the film's conclusion but gave him credit for bringing "increasingly mature moviemaking" to his production, highlighting the Madea scenes as being "pretty damn funny" and the performances of Wilson and Henson for being "nuanced and quite moving" and having a "likable screen presence" respectively.
