= Madea =

Fictional character

- Madea serving time in prison for committing a series of crimes, as seen in Madea Goes to Jail
- First appearance: I Can Do Bad All by Myself (stage play, 1999); Diary of a Mad Black Woman (film, 2005)
- Created by: Tyler Perry
- Portrayed by: Tyler Perry

In-universe information
- Full name: Mabel Earlene Simmons
- Family: "Big Mabel" Murphy (mother); Fredrick Baker Sr. (father); Joe (brother); Fredrick (brother); Irene (sister); Willie Humphrey (brother); Heathrow (brother)
- Spouses: Johnny Simmons (deceased); 17 deceased husbands
- Children: Michelle Simmons; William Simmons; Cora Jean Simmons; Myrtle Simmons (daughter-in-law); Nikki Grady-Simmons (foster daughter)
- Relatives: See all: Helen McCarter (granddaughter); Jackie (granddaughter); Gina (granddaughter); Vianne (granddaughter); Maylee (granddaughter); Lisa (granddaughter); Tina (granddaughter); Darlene (granddaughter); Laura (granddaughter); Ellie (granddaughter); Robin (granddaughter); Charles McCarter (ex grandson-in-law); Orlando (grandson-in-law); Keisha (great-granddaughter); Shemar (great-granddaughter); Malik (great-grandson); Titi (great-granddaughter); Tim (great-grandson); Ruby (aunt); Vickie (niece); Shirley (niece); Munroe (nephew); Angela (niece); Eileen Murphy (niece); Sonny (nephew); Brian (nephew); Donna (niece); Victoria Breaux (niece); Vianne (niece); Isaac (nephew); Anthony (nephew-in-law); Mike (grandnephew); Tiffany (grandniece); BJ (grandnephew); Lisa Breaux (grandniece); Vanessa Breaux-Henderson (grandniece); George Needleman (nephew); Cindy Needleman (great-niece); Howie Needleman (great-nephew); Nima (great-grandniece); Jonathan (great-grandnephew); AJ (grandnephew); Silvia (grandniece); Jesse (grandnephew); Jason (grandnephew-in-law); Calvin (grandnephew-in-law); Harold (grandnephew-in-law); Will (grandnephew-in-law); Carol (grandniece-in-law); Lacey Murphy (grandniece); Kimberly (grandniece); Tammy (grandniece); Byron (grandnephew); H.J. (great-grandnephew); Will (great-grandnephew); C.J. (great-grandnephew); B.J. (great-grandnephew); Sarah (cousin); May (cousin); Pete (cousin); Isaac Sr. (cousin); Grover (cousin); Aunt Bam (cousin)
- Nationality: American

Mabel Earlene "Madea" Simmons, a.k.a. "Ma", is a character created and portrayed by Tyler Perry. She is presented as a tough, street-smart elderly Black American woman.

Madea is based on Perry's mother and his aunt. In Perry's own words, Madea is "exactly the PG version of my mother and my aunt, and I loved having an opportunity to pay homage to them. She would beat the hell out of you but make sure the ambulance got there in time to make sure they could set your arm back because the love was there inside all of it."

The Madea films and plays and stage plays feature several genres and themes. The character also appeared in sketches on The Tonight Show Starring Jimmy Fallon.

== Fictional biography ==
=== Early years ===
Madea was born in Greensburg, Louisiana on June 26, 1935, and raised in New Orleans, Louisiana, and it was confirmed in Boo 2! A Madea Halloween, when she went to a police station and saw her name on a wanted poster.

In the title sequence to Madea Goes to Jail, her suspended driver's license indicates her birth date as April 26, 1962.

Her age varies in different movies and plays. Madea was 68 in the first play, I Can Do Bad All by Myself, as well as Madea's Class Reunion. In A Madea Homecoming, set in 2022, it is said she is 95 years old.

She is described as being brought up in poverty, growing up in a shotgun house with her parents and siblings. Madea has stated that although her family didn't have much, they had love.

When she was in her early teens, her family moved to Atlanta, Georgia, where they lived on the west side. She attended Booker T. Washington High School and was a cheerleader. In I Can Do Bad All by Myself, it is revealed how she resided in Cleveland, Alabama, and later returned to Atlanta.

According to A Madea Christmas: The Play, Madea's mother, "Big Mabel" Murphy, was a hooker during Madea's childhood and was not at all religious. Madea grew up with little knowledge of religion, explaining why she has a tendency to misquote the Bible. Madea makes frequent reference to herself once being a hooker and a stripper.

Her maiden name is not stated, but it is presumably either Baker or Murphy, the last names of her father and mother, respectively.

It is not revealed where and when she met her first husband, Johnny. Madea and Johnny had their first child, Michelle, as young teens, possibly 15 or 16. When Madea was 18, she got pregnant with her other daughter, Cora, through a one-night stand. Sometime later, Madea and Johnny had a son, William. All of her children are said to be married and had children. Madea and Johnny raised two of their grandchildren, Maylee and Vianne, after their daughter's death from drug addiction.

=== Criminal background ===
In Madea Goes to Jail, it is explained of how Madea's criminal record began at age nine with a charge of theft. She was charged with her first felony at this age and her crimes began progressing to illegal gambling at age 18, which later evolved into check fraud, identity theft, insurance fraud (related to her nine deceased husbands), assault, attempted murder, road rage (usually when Madea is in vehicle), and vehicle theft and destruction.

In Diary of a Mad Black Woman, Madea and her granddaughter Helen McCarter were both arrested and charged with "criminal trespassing, reckless endangerment, criminal possession of a handgun, assault with a deadly weapon, [driving on a] suspended license, expired registration, reckless driving, and a broken taillight". This caused Judge Mablean Ephriam to place Madea on house arrest while Helen was placed on a bail of $5,000.00.

In Madea's Family Reunion, Madea was brought before Judge Ephriam once again after she removed her ankle monitor in order to purchase her brother Joe's medication, in effect violating her house arrest. After rigorous efforts, Brian was finally able to persuade Madea to accept Judge Ephriam's ruling to become the foster mother of Nikki Grady.

In Meet the Browns, Madea was arrested for causing a high speed chase following a routine traffic stop, resisting arrest, and assaulting a police officer while Joe fled the area claiming that Madea kidnapped him.

In Madea Goes to Jail, Madea was brought before Judge Ephriam because of the car chase in the last film. Because Brian and assistant district attorney Linda Davis brought up the fact that the arresting police officers failed to read Madea her Miranda rights, Judge Ephriam scolded the police officers that were present for that negligence. Because of this, Judge Ephriam lets Madea go on a technicality while suspending her already suspended driver's license and having her undergo anger management therapy that was overseen by Phil McGraw. Later on, she was arrested once again for using forklift to carry a woman's Pontiac Solstice and subsequently improperly dropping it in the parking lot of the Big Kmart after the woman stole Madea's parking spot. She was sentenced to 5 to 10 years in prison by Judge Greg Mathis. This is later overturned due to the illegal tampering of Linda Davis and she is part of the "Georgia Seven" that are released.

In Madea's Big Happy Family, Madea smashes her car into the fast-food restaurant Smax when manager Sabrina would not give her the ordered, even using excuses related to her Cadillac's technical problems in order to persuade the manager to give her food while waiting. Madea nearly runs over the customers, and throws products to Sabrina and employees. No police action was brought up.

In the animated film Madea's Tough Love, Madea is arrested for excessive damage to public property (which she unintentionally committed while chasing after two unruly skateboarders Netta and Dang Dang), two bench warrants, 25 unpaid parking tickets, and an unpaid speeding ticket. Judge Michaels sentences her to do community service work at the Moms Mabley Youth Center. In addition, Judge Michaels had a special ankle monitor placed on Madea to make sure she does her community service and enlists two police officers named Fred and Frank to keep an eye on her. After Madea is filmed spanking Netta, Judge Michaels reassigns Madea to fulfill the rest of her sentence on house arrest much to the annoyance of Joe. Madea was released from the sentence when the truth about mayoral candidate Betsy Holliday's secret illegal activities were exposed proving that Madea was right about her.

== Media and entertainment featuring Madea ==
Madea has appeared in several plays (which have been filmed for repeated viewing), fully produced movies, a couple of television programs (guest appearances), one book and one animated film. The character made her first appearance in the 1999 play I Can Do Bad All by Myself, later appearing in numerous other plays by Perry, then appearing in films based on those plays. Madea franchise film Joe's College Trip, which had Madea's brother, Joe in the central focus, was released on Netflix on February 13, 2026.

=== Plays (including recorded plays) ===
- I Can Do Bad All by Myself — 1999
- Diary of a Mad Black Woman — 2001
- Madea's Family Reunion — 2002
- Madea's Class Reunion — 2003
- Madea Goes to Jail — 2005
- Madea's Big Happy Family — 2010
- A Madea Christmas — 2011
- Madea Gets a Job — 2012
- Madea's Neighbors from Hell — 2013
- Madea on the Run — 2017
- Madea's Farewell Play — 2019

=== Films ===
- Diary of a Mad Black Woman — 2005
- Madea's Family Reunion — 2006
- Meet the Browns — 2008
- Madea Goes to Jail — 2009
- I Can Do Bad All by Myself — 2009
- Madea's Big Happy Family — 2011
- Madea's Witness Protection — 2012
- A Madea Christmas — 2013
- Boo! A Madea Halloween — 2016
- Boo 2! A Madea Halloween — 2017
- A Madea Family Funeral — 2019
- A Madea Homecoming — 2022
- Madea's Destination Wedding — 2025
- Joe's College Road Trip — 2026

==== Animated film ====
- Madea's Tough Love — 2015

=== Television series ===
==== House of Payne (guest appearances) ====
In the TBS comedy drama House of Payne pilot episode "Bully and the Beast", Madea was the foster mother of Nikki. She factored into the plot through a school altercation between her adopted daughter and Curtis Payne's great-nephew Malik. Curtis takes a particular disliking to Madea who is not in the least bit intimidated by Curtis at all. Rather conversely, Curtis became intimidated by Madea and had nightmares about her.

In the episode "The Wench Who Saved Christmas", Curtis tries to discourage everyone from having the Christmas spirit. He later fell asleep and dreamt that Madea was the Ghosts of Christmas past, present, and future. In this form, she tried to teach him a lesson about his killjoy behavior.

In the episode "Wife Swap", Curtis' wife Ella chastises him for taking her for granted. That night, Curtis has an extended nightmare where he is married to Madea instead of Ella.

==== Meet the Browns (mentioned) ====
On another TBS series, Meet the Browns, Mable is said to be the mother of Cora Simmons as a result of a one-night stand with the show's lead character, Mr. Leroy Brown. She is an unseen character throughout the series.

==== Love Thy Neighbour (guest appearance) ====
On January 21, 2015, Madea made a special guest appearance in the Oprah Winfrey Network comedy series, Love Thy Neighbor. The episode titled "Madea's Pressure Is Up" aired as part of the 3rd Episode of the 2nd season of Love Thy Neighbor.

==== Television late night shows ====
- The Tonight Show Starring Jimmy Fallon — 2017

=== Miscellaneous ===
In a commercial for BET+, Tyler Perry explained this streaming service to Madea and Joe at the time when they were arguing on what to watch on TV.

=== Cast and characters ===
List indicators

This section includes characters who will appear or have appeared in multiple films and/or television series in the franchise.

- An empty grey cell indicates the character was not in the film, or that the character's official presence has not yet been confirmed.
- ^{A} indicates an appearance through archival footage or audio.
- ^{C} indicates a cameo role.
- ^{P} indicates an appearance in onscreen photographs.
- ^{U} indicates an uncredited appearance.
- ^{V} indicates a voice-only role.
- ^{Y} indicates a younger version of the character.

Character	Films															Television series				
Character	Diary of a Mad Black Woman	Madea's Family Reunion	Meet the Browns	Madea Goes to Jail	I Can Do Bad All by Myself	Madea's Big Happy Family	Madea's Witness Protection	A Madea Christmas	Madea's Tough Love	Boo! A Madea Halloween	Boo 2! A Madea Halloween	A Madea Family Funeral	A Madea Homecoming	Madea's Destination Wedding	Joe's College Road Trip	House of Payne	Meet the Browns	Love Thy Neighbor	The Paynes	Assisted Living
Character	2005	2006	2008	2009		2011	2012	2013	2015	2016	2017	2019	2022	2025	2026	2007–2012, 2020–present	2009–2011	2013–2017	2018	2020–present
Mabel "Madea" Simmons	Tyler Perry	Tyler Perry	Tyler Perry^{C}	Tyler Perry	Tyler Perry	Tyler Perry	Tyler Perry	Tyler Perry	Tyler Perry	Tyler Perry	Tyler Perry	Tyler Perry	Tyler Perry	Tyler Perry	Tyler Perry	Tyler Perry		Tyler Perry^{P}	Tyler Perry^{P}	
Uncle Joe	Tyler Perry	Tyler Perry	Tyler Perry^{C}	Tyler Perry	Tyler Perry	Tyler Perry	Tyler Perry		Tyler Perry	Tyler Perry	Tyler Perry	Tyler Perry	Tyler Perry	Tyler Perry	Tyler Perry					
Brian	Tyler Perry	Tyler Perry		Tyler Perry			Tyler Perry		Tyler Perry	Tyler Perry	Tyler Perry	Tyler Perry		Tyler Perry	Tyler Perry					
Mr. Leroy Brown			David Mann	David Mann		David Mann							David Mann	David Mann	David Mann	David Mann				David Mann
Cora Simmons	Tamela Mann		Tamela Mann	Tamela Mann		Tamela Mann							Tamela Mann	Tamela Mann	Tamela Mann	Tamela Mann				Tamela Mann
Ella Payne (née Williams) Betty Ann "Aunt Bam" Murphy Sarah		Cassi Davis				Cassi Davis			Cassi Davis	Cassi Davis	Cassi Davis	Cassi Davis	Cassi Davis	Cassi Davis	Cassi Davis					
Curtis Payne Bus Driver			LaVan Davis													LaVan Davis	LaVan Davis	LaVan Davis	LaVan Davis	
Hattie Mae Love										Patrice Lovely	Patrice Lovely	Patrice Lovely					Patrice Lovely			
Myrtle Simmons	Cicely Tyson	Cicely Tyson																		
Will Brown			Lamman Rucker													Lamman Rucker	Lamman Rucker			
Michael Brown Calvin Payne			Lance Gross													Lance Gross			Lance Gross	
Nikki Grady-Simmons		Keke Palmer														Keke Palmer				
Tiffany	Tiffany Evans									Diamond White	Diamond White			Diamond White						

=== Book ===
Don't Make a Black Woman Take Off Her Earrings: Perry wrote the book in the character's persona. The book was published on April 11, 2006.

== Reception ==
In 2009, Entertainment Weekly put the character on its end-of-the-decade, "best-of" list, saying, "Whether she's going to jail or just opening up a can of whupass, Tyler Perry's Madea is the profane, gun-toting granny you never had but (maybe) wish you did."

On April 1, 2013, Orlando Jones pulled an April Fools' Day prank, informing the public via his Huffington Post account that he would be replacing Perry as Madea. Jones led the public to believe that the decision had come amid Perry's prior obligations, assisting Oprah Winfrey with her struggling OWN network. As part of the prank, Jones released a photo of himself to the public in which he was impersonating Madea. In addition, he incorporated several pretend quotes seemingly issued by Perry, both acknowledging the news and giving Jones his blessing to continue on with the character. Unaware of the prank, fans responded with outrage and criticism. As result of increasing outcries from fans, Perry informed the public on April 15, 2013, that the news was untrue. Perry was quoted as stating "That was an April Fool's joke that HE did. Not true. And not funny. When I'm done with Madea, she is done."

Perry has been accused of minstrelsy and playing into black stereotypes with the Madea character, most notably by fellow black director Spike Lee. Perry's argument with Lee dates back to a 2009 interview in which Lee referred to Perry's films as "coonery buffoonery". Lee equated the Madea movies with the old-time minstrel shows which lampooned black people as dim-witted, lazy, buffoonish, superstitious and happy-go-lucky, and further stated that if a white director made a movie depicting black people in such a manner he would be ostracized. Perry responded by stating that his films were meant as entertainment and should not be taken so seriously, saying, "I am sick of him talking about me. I am sick of him saying, 'This is a coon, this is a buffoon.' I am sick of him talking about black people going to see movies. This is what he said: 'You vote by what you see'—as if black people don't know what they want to see. I am sick of him. He talked about Whoopi, he talked about Oprah, he talked about me, he talked about Clint Eastwood. Spike needs to shut the hell up!" Perry has been criticized for stereotyping black femininity using black masculinity. Some critics believe that the characterization of Madea, in addition to other black women featured in Madea films, works to legitimize harmful and damaging stereotypes. There is growing concern around these depictions of blackness as critics believe they can have a negative impact on how black women see themselves in society and how they are perceived by others. In addition, Tyler Perry's role as Madea has received criticism due to some viewing his cross-gender acting as a misappropriation of drag culture. Critics have alleged Tyler Perry perpetuates patriarchal ideology through his characterization of Madea and her interactions with other protagonists.

== Parody and satire ==
- Tracy Jordan plays a parody of Madea and Tyler Perry in the show 30 Rock called "Aunt Fatso".
- In the American Dad! episode "Spelling Bee My Baby" (2013; S09 E14), Steve Smith deliberately misspelled his words in a spelling bee so as to express his love for Akiko (who was also competing), instead spelling random Tyler Perry/Madea films.
- The character was parodied on The Boondocks episode "Pause" (2010; S03 E07), in which a thinly disguised version of Perry named Winston Jerome (voiced by Affion Crockett) plays a similar character to Madea called Ma Duke.
- Madea was parodied in The Cleveland Show episode "A Brown Thanksgiving", with Donna being shown to have an aunt called "Auntie Momma" (voiced by Kym Whitley). However, it's later revealed that it's her Uncle Kevin (voiced by Kevin Michael Richardson) dressing up as a woman.
- In the South Park episode Funnybot (2011; S15 E02), Perry (voiced by Trey Parker) played his character Madea after being repeatedly paid by Tolkien Black after every joke, and was trapped in a metallic shell by the Americans and the Germans to be left underground at the conclusion.
- In early December 2012, Madea was parodied on a Saturday Night Live episode by the episode's host Jamie Foxx.
- Madea was parodied in the American satirical horror film Scary Movie 5 (2013), directed by Malcolm D. Lee. Madea was portrayed by actor Lewis Thompson.
- Madea and Tyler Perry are both parodied in the spoof movie Not Another Church Movie (2024), with the names MaDude and Taylor Pharry (with the H being silent).

== See also ==
- Cross-gender acting
- Mrs. Brown's Boys
- Angry black woman
