= Madea Goes to Jail =

2009 film by Tyler Perry

- Theatrical release poster
- Directed by: Tyler Perry
- Written by: Tyler Perry
- Based on: Madea Goes to Jail by Tyler Perry
- Produced by: Tyler Perry; Reuben Cannon
- Starring: Tyler Perry; Derek Luke; Keshia Knight Pulliam; Ion Overman; RonReaco Lee; Sofía Vergara; Vanessa Ferlito; Viola Davis
- Cinematography: Alexander Gruszynski
- Edited by: Maysie Hoy
- Music by: Aaron Zigman
- Production company: Tyler Perry Studios
- Distributed by: Lionsgate
- Release date: February 20, 2009
- Running time: 103 minutes
- Country: United States
- Language: English
- Budget: $17.5 million
- Box office: $90.5 million

Madea Goes to Jail is a 2009 American comedy-drama film written and directed by Tyler Perry, which was based on his 2005 play, and starring Perry, Derek Luke, Keshia Knight Pulliam, Ion Overman, RonReaco Lee, Sofía Vergara, Vanessa Ferlito, and Viola Davis.

The film tells the story of Madea going to prison for her uncontrollable anger management problems as she befriends a young incarcerated prostitute whom an assistant district attorney has known since college.

The film had its premiere in Atlanta, Georgia on February 16, 2009, and was theatrically released on February 20, 2009. Madea Goes to Jail received negative reviews from critics and grossed $90.5 million worldwide.

== Plot ==
A freeway police chase (Note: Seen in Meet the Browns.) results in Madea being pulled over and arrested. Assistant district attorney Joshua Hardaway is set to prosecute prostitute and drug addict Candace "Candy" Washington-Collins. Josh, who already knows Candace, asks his fiancée and fellow ADA Linda Davis to fill in on his behalf. Afterwards, Brian Simmons and Davis secure Madea's release when it is revealed that the officers failed to read her Miranda warning. Unable to put Madea away, Judge Ephriam places her in an anger management course.

Josh then posts Candace's bond, and they eat at a diner. Josh keeps helping Candace to the point of rescuing her from pimp Arthur, who harassed her and her prostitute friend Donna. Josh brings Candace to his apartment, further angering Linda, who threatens to leave him unless he cuts Candace out of his life. Madea's anger management course overseen by Phil McGraw does not go well.

Josh runs into his friend Ellen, a former drug addict and prostitute who has become a minister and helps other women get off the streets. Josh convinces Ellen to help Candace get a job interview. However, Mr. Brackman sexually harasses Candace who attacks him and Ellen states that he set her back. After confronting a woman who stole her parking spot at Kmart, Madea wrecks the woman's car with a forklift truck. Later that night, Madea gets arrested.

At the DA's office, Josh's best friend Chuck discovers that Linda is falsifying Candace's file to get her sent to prison, a practice she has engaged with other defendants too, including Madea. Linda blackmails him to keep his mouth shut, threatening to expose the fact that Chuck cheated on the bar exam to get his law license.

Josh later reveals to Ellen that he and Candace were close friends from childhood, but during their college years, all of Josh's friends bullied Candace because of her background. Out of embarrassment, he started pushing her away. One night, Josh took Candace to a party, where his friends gang-raped her after he left to go on a date. Since then, Josh has harbored guilt for failing to protect her. Ellen says that he should not continue holding on to the guilt.

Madea is sentenced for five to ten years by Judge Mathis. Candace does not show up to her trial and is handed a seventeen-year prison sentence according to Linda who lies to Josh that she tried to be lenient, but the case was "too severe". Having returned to her prostitution lifestyle, Candace gets arrested by an undercover police officer.

While in DeKalb County Prison, Madea gets a cellmate in T.T. who is a serial killer. Candace reunites with Donna and becomes acquainted with the other inmates including Madea, who ends up defending her from prison "boss" Big Sal's aggressive advances. The convicts attend a class taught by Ellen at the prison to have time reduced from their sentences. During a lesson about forgiveness, Madea notices that some inmates would play victim instead of taking responsibility for their crimes. She tells the class that they need to stop seeing themselves as victims and forgive those who put them onto the bad paths they have been on, as they were not the ones who ended up in jail.

Moved, Candace confronts Josh during a visit and reveals that back when she was raped, she called his name repeatedly. She subsequently allowed her anger at him and the trauma from the attack to consume her, which led to her dropping out of school and becoming an addict and prostitute. However, after everything she learned from Ellen and Madea, she decides to forgive Josh and resume a better life.

On Josh's wedding day, Chuck comes forward to Josh about Linda's scheme. Appalled, Josh tells the congregation, including their boss, the Mayor and the Governor what Linda has done and jilts her at the altar. At the prison, Josh professes his love to Candace and promises to help her restore her life.

Josh exposes Linda's crimes to the media, triggering a protest movement to set free those she wrongfully convicted. A news report states that Linda was indicted on multiple charges including fraud, tampering, and providing false legal documents and will have to turn herself in at some point. Candace, Madea, and five other women have their convictions overturned and are released. Walking out of the prison together, Josh and Candace kiss in front of the press.

== Cast ==
- Tyler Perry as:
  - Mabel "Madea" Simmons, a tough old lady.
  - Joe Simmons, Madea's brother.
  - Brian Simmons, a lawyer who is Madea's nephew and Joe's son.
- Derek Luke as Joshua Hardaway, an assistant district attorney.
- Keshia Knight Pulliam as Candace "Candy" Washington-Collins, a prostitute and former friend of Joshua.
- Ion Overman as Linda Davis, an envious assistant district attorney and Joshua's fiancée who secretly commits illegal activities like fraud, evidence tampering, and providing false legal documents involving some of the people she prosecuted.
- RonReaco Lee as Chuck, an assistant district attorney and Joshua's friend.
- Sofía Vergara as Terry "T.T.", a female serial killer that becomes Madea's cellmate.
- Vanessa Ferlito as Donna, a prostitute and Candace's friend.
- Viola Davis as Ellen Holmes, a minister who used to be a prostitute.
- Tamela Mann as Cora Simmons, Madea's daughter.
- David Mann as Mr. Brown, Cora's father.
- Bobbi Baker as Tanya, Linda's friend
- Aisha Hinds as Fran, the head assistant district attorney who is Joshua, Linda, and Chuck's boss.
- Leon Lamar as an old man at Joe's party.
- Benjamín Benítez as Arthur, a pimp that harasses Candy.
- Jackson Walker as Mr. Brackman, a man who interviews Candy for a job.
- Robin Coleman as Big Sal, a tough inmate and prison "boss" that runs afoul of Madea.
- Karan Kendrick as Watson, a prison officer at DeKalb County Prison.

=== Cameos ===
- Phil McGraw as himself, he acts as Madea's anger management counselor.
- Mablean Ephriam as herself, a judge that sentences Madea to anger management.
- Greg Mathis as himself, a judge that sentences Madea to 5 to 10 years in prison.
- Al Sharpton as himself, he talks about the actions of Linda on Keepin' It Real with Al Sharpton
- Whoopi Goldberg as herself, she appears on The View talking about Madea.
- Sherri Shepherd as herself, she appears on The View talking about Madea.
- Elisabeth Hasselbeck as herself, she appears on The View talking about Madea.
- Joy Behar as herself, she appears on The View talking about Madea.
- Tom Joyner as himself, a radio show host that talks about the actions of Linda.
- Steve Harvey as himself, he talks about the actions of Linda on The Steve Harvey Morning Show.
- Michael Baisden as himself, a radio personality who talks about the actions of Linda. He labeled Madea, Candace, and the other 5 inmates as the Georgia Seven, while also referencing the Jena Six.
- Frank Ski as himself, a radio personality who talks about the actions of Linda.

== Release ==
=== Critical reception ===
On the review aggregator website Rotten Tomatoes, 27% of 51 critics' reviews are positive. The website's consensus reads: "Divided between sincere melodrama and populist comedy, Madea Goes to Jail fails to provide enough laughs -- or screen time -- for its titular heroine." Metacritic, which uses a weighted average, assigned the film a score of 50 out of 100, based on 13 critics, indicating "mixed or average" reviews. Audiences surveyed by CinemaScore gave the film a grade "A" on scale of A to F.

Sam Adams of the Chicago Tribune gave the film 2.5/4 stars and wrote that "if the movie is a mess, it's a purposeful mess, cannily, if not artfully, pushing all the right buttons to ensure Perry will be back for another round."

According to a New York Times review, the film gives Madea herself a much more central role than some of the previous Madea movies, in some of which she is merely a commentator on events.

The Boston Globe reported that "(Madea's) character epitomizes Perry's ongoing commitment to dramatizing as many rungs on the ladder of the black experience as he can. His aim never produces a completely satisfying or consistently competent-looking movie (his heart's in the right place, if not his camerawork)."

=== Box office ===
On its opening weekend, the film opened at #1, and grossed $41,030,947 (2,032 theaters, $20,192 average), the biggest Friday to Sunday take since Twilight in November 2008. It broke Madea's Family Reunion weekend gross at $30 million as the highest weekend gross for a Tyler Perry film. It broke Saw III's record at $33 million for the highest weekend gross for Lionsgate Entertainment. "We were cautiously optimistic we could do 30-plus," Steve Rothenberg said. On its second weekend, it dropped 61 percent, but remained at #1 grossing another $16,175,926 (2,052 theaters, $7,883 average), bringing the 10-day gross to $64,525,548. The film closed on April 23, 2009 with a final domestic gross of $90,508,336.

=== Home media ===
An exclusive preview was included on the cinematic release of Tyler Perry's The Family That Preys.

Madea Goes to Jail was released on June 16, 2009 on DVD in both fullscreen and widescreen editions. According to DVDTown, the DVD included six behind-the-scenes featurettes. As of July 12, 2009, 1,125,422 DVD units have been sold, gathering revenue of $18,223,621. A Blu-ray version was released on November 23, 2010.

=== Legacy ===
The 2012 interactive children's film The Oogieloves in the Big Balloon Adventure was inspired in part by Madea Goes to Jail. In a Hollywood Reporter interview, Oogieloves producer Kenn Viselman recounted his experience watching Madea, in which moviegoers around him were yelling advice to the characters in the movie, giving him the idea to make his film interactive.
