= Madea's Tough Love =

Tyler Perry's Madea's Tough Love
- DVD cover
- Directed by: Frank Marino
- Screenplay by: Matt Fleckenstein
- Story by: Ben Chambers and Benjamin Gluck
- Based on: Characters created by Tyler Perry
- Produced by: Ozzie Areu; Ken Katsumoto; Matt Moore; Tyler Perry; Eric S. Rollman
- Starring: Tyler Perry; Cassi Davis; Rolonda Watts; Avery Kidd Waddell; Philip Anthony-Rodriguez; Georg Stanford Brown; Kevin Michael Richardson; Mari Williams; Indigo; Caitlyn Taylor Love; Maya Kay; Kate Higgins; Bootsy Collins
- Edited by: Leo Papin
- Music by: Frank Ciampi
- Production companies: Tyler Perry Studios; Bento Box Entertainment
- Distributed by: Lionsgate Home Entertainment
- Release date: January 20, 2015
- Running time: 64 minutes
- Country: United States
- Language: English
- Box office: $2.5 million

Tyler Perry's Madea's Tough Love is a 2015 American live action-animated comedy film directed by Frank Marino, written by Matt Fleckenstein produced by Tyler Perry, Matt Moore, and Ozzie Areu, and starring the voices of Perry, Cassi Davis, Rolonda Watts, Avery Kidd Waddell, Philip Anthony-Rodriguez, Georg Stanford Brown, Kevin Michael Richardson, Mari Williams, Indigo, Caitlyn Taylor Love, Maya Kay, Kate Higgins, and Bootsy Collins. The film tells the story of Madea being sentenced to community service at a youth center as she comes across a devious plot to destroy it. It was released on January 20, 2015., having an unusually more positive tone for a Madea movie. While the film is mainly animated and serves as Tyler Perry Studios' first live action-animated film, the beginning and ending scenes however are live-action like the other Madea films.

== Plot ==
In the live-action real world, Madea is watching television while eating her breakfast. After wishing she could discipline the kids in the animated show she is watching, she is transported into the cartoon after pushing a button that reads “Do Not Push” on her TV remote.

In the animated world, Madea chases a group of rude and unruly skateboarders named Netta and Dang Dang, a chase that the police soon join. Madea elicits an apology from Netta and Dang Dang, but is subsequently arrested by Officer Frank, Officer Fred, and their fellow police officers for excessive damage to public property, two bench warrants, 25 unpaid parking tickets, and an unpaid speeding ticket.

At the courthouse with her nephew Brian Simmons defending her, Madea is sentenced by Judge Michaels to community service guiding the young souls at the Moms Mabley Youth Center where a special monitor is placed on her to make sure she does her job as Officers Fred and Frank are assigned to keep an eye on Madea.

With Joe and Aunt Bam present, Madea attends the youth center's gym class and is horrified at the kids' raucous behavior. Madea locks the children in a cage, but the children protest, claiming they have to practice to win a local sporting event and its cash prize. The police are alerted to Madea's actions as she tries to catch Netta, causing Officers Frank and Fred return her home.

That evening, Madea returns to the youth center to find her purse. She encounters two of the children, Netta and Dang Dang, who are also looking for the purse. After learning the children are homeless, Madea takes them home with her. Madea makes the children breakfast in the morning, but after learning Madea is planning to call social services, Netta and Dang Dang leave.

Madea finds Netta and Dang Dang playing basketball with the other children at Moms Mabley Youth Center in Freedom Park. However, the center is condemned by Betsy Holiday, a mayoral candidate for Atlanta who is running against Mayor Thomas while working for a mysterious person who runs M.A.N. Corporation and had previously taken Holiday off the streets. Holiday details her plans to construct new buildings and make the city's neighborhoods safe for children. However, Madea distrusts Holiday's intentions. Madea takes the children to Chastain Park, which has since been repurposed into a shopping mall, and explains this is what Holiday intends to do with their youth center.

Madea breaks into Holiday's headquarters and confronts her. Madea learns Holiday also has a team entering the sporting event, the "Chastain Park Players". After getting filmed spanking Netta, Madea is taken away by Officers Frank and Fred following a call to them from Judge Michaels. Holiday takes Netta and Dang Dang in separating them from the rest of the team. Madea is told by Judge Michaels that she will fulfill the rest of her sentence under house arrest much to the dismay of Joe. Officers Fred and Frank take Madea home where they claim to each other they partially believe Madea's claim about Holiday.

After escaping her house with Joe and Aunt Bam, Madea rallies the children together after persuading the police to help her against Holiday. Netta and Dang Dang defect back to the Chastain Park Players. They ultimately defeat the Chastain Park Players in the sporting event and win the $25,000 prize, which they will use to save the youth center after it was discovered that Holiday rigged Netta's sneakers to make her lose. Madea and the children celebrate, but Holiday steals the check and speeds away with Madea and the police able to catch her as her wig comes off. Holiday is arrested for her crimes.

The youth center is saved where Madea, Joe, Brian, Officer Fred, Officer Frank, and Judge Michaels assist in the repairs and the refurbishing. Madea, Joe, and Aunt Bam are watching a friendly basketball game while Holiday is seen doing community service. She implies that she is happier now that she is not running for mayor or working for bosses anymore, but Madea teases her by throwing chips on the floor. The mysterious person running M.A.N. Corporation watches from his limousine and plans to have his revenge on Madea. However, his limousine gets caught in a traffic jam and upon seeing Madea driving over the traffic with the hydraulics in her car, the mysterious person states that his limousine needs hydraulics built into it.

Back in the live-action real world, Madea wakes up back at her kitchen table eating breakfast, and wonders if the situation was a dream when she notices that the "Do Not Push" button is absent from the TV remote.

== Cast ==
- Tyler Perry as
  - Madea Simmons, a tough old lady.
  - Joe Simmons, the brother of Madea.
  - Brian Simmons, a lawyer who is the nephew of Madea and the son of Joe. Unlike the other films, Brian only has one line in this film.
- Cassi Davis as Aunt Bam, the cousin of Madea.
- Rolonda Watts as Betsy Holiday, a mayoral candidate who wants to level Freedom Park.
- Avery Kidd Waddell as Officer Fred, a police officer assigned to oversee Madea's community service.
- Philip Anthony-Rodriguez as Officer Frank, a police officer assigned to oversee Madea's community service.
- Georg Stanford Brown as Mystery Man, an unnamed man who runs the M.A.N. Corporation who is also Holiday's benefactor.
- Kevin Michael Richardson as Judge Michaels, a judge who sentences Madea to community service at the Moms Mabley Youth Center.
- Mari Williams as Netta, a homeless girl at the Moms Mabley Youth Center.
- Indigo as Dang Dang, a homeless boy at the Moms Mabley Youth Center and Netta's younger brother.
- Caitlyn Taylor Love as:
  - Wheels, a paraplegic boy at the Moms Mabley Youth Center.
  - Chris, a boy at the Moms Mabley Youth Center.
- Maya Kay as Lacy, a girl at the Moms Mabley Youth Center.
- Kate Higgins as Yoshi, a boy at the Moms Mabley Youth Center.
- Bootsy Collins as Homeless Man
- Dan Gordon as Police Officer #1
- Jess Harnell as:
  - Betsy Holiday's campaign manager
  - Basketball Announcer
- Mela Lee as an old lady who Netta and Dang Dang harass
- Nic Robuck as Police Officer #2
- Keith Silverstein as Helicopter Pilot
- Cree Summer as:
  - Woman in Crowd (credited)
  - Female Police Officer (uncredited)

== Crew ==
- Charlie Adler - Voice Director
- Craig Hartlin - Voice Director

== Reception ==
Brian Orndorf of Blu-ray.com gave the film a five out of ten, saying "Tough Love plays to the Perry fanbase, featuring cameos by Madea's brother Joe and Aunt Bam (Cassi Davis), and keeps its street cred with a finale that includes a chase between two cars fitted with hydraulics. It's also blessedly short (64 minutes), which is exactly the type of brevity this character needs to succeed. Madea's Tough Love isn't funny, not even amusing, but it's palatable, which is a rare reaction to a Perry project. The ending promises a sequel, which isn't necessary, but if Madea must return to action, I'd rather watch her as an animated character than endure Perry in drag once again."
