= Reuben Cannon =

American producer and casting director (born 1946)

Reuben Cannon (born February 11, 1946 ) is an American film producer and casting director. Cannon was the first black casting director in Hollywood; he was the head of television casting for Warner Brothers from 1977 to 1978, and started his own casting agency in 1978 (Reuben Cannon & Associates). Through this company, he has cast nearly 100 television series, made-for-TV movies, and feature films. He won the Artios Award for Best Casting for Feature Film—Drama for The Color Purple, which was the feature film debut of Whoopi Goldberg and Oprah Winfrey (both of whom earned Oscar nominations for these roles), and an early film of Danny Glover. Cannon has also worked as a producer on most of Tyler Perry's television shows and movies.

== Filmography (selected) ==
- Madea's Big Happy Family (2011)
- Why Did I Get Married Too? (2010)
- I Can Do Bad All by Myself (2009)
- Madea Goes to Jail (2009)
- The Family That Preys (2008)
- Meet the Browns (2008)
- Why Did I Get Married? (2007)
- Daddy's Little Girls (2007)
- Madea's Family Reunion (2006)
- Diary Of A Mad Black Woman (2005)
- Woman Thou Art Loosed (2004)
- Love Don't Cost a Thing (2003)
- Dancing in September (2000)

== Awards (selected) ==
- Humanitas, Film Award, for Dancing in September (nomination), 2001
- The Chrysler Group, Behind the Lens Award, 2002
- Morehouse College, honorary doctorate, 2002
- Artios Award, Outstanding Achievement in Feature Film Casting – Drama, 1986
