= Don't Make a Black Woman Take Off Her Earrings =

2006 novel by Tyler Perry

- Author: Tyler Perry
- Language: English
- Genre: Humor
- Publisher: Riverhead Hardcover
- Publication date: April 11, 2006
- Publication place: United States
- Media type: Print (hardback & paperback)
- Pages: 272
- ISBN: 1-59448-921-1

Don't Make a Black Woman Take Off Her Earrings is a 2006 humor novel by Tyler Perry and focuses on his character of Madea. The book won the 2006 Quills Awards for Book of the Year, and spent twelve weeks on both The New York Times and USA Today bestseller lists.

== Synopsis ==
Don't Make a Black Woman Take Off Her Earrings is a collection of advice, stories, and wisdom written in the viewpoint of Madea. The topics covered in the book range from marriage, family, finance, religion, and gun care.

== Reception ==
Critical reception to Don't Make a Black Woman Take Off Her Earrings was mixed to positive. AALBC.com wrote "it's unfortunate that someone being touted as a role model would have so many negative traits, even if it's all just a joke" but that the book was "not intended to be taken at face value". Publishers Weekly called the book "a surprisingly fresh compilation of homespun advice". AudioFile positively reviewed the audiobook, saying that Tyler "makes the most of this audio form, and his own heartfelt epilogue gives a glimpse into the creative spirit who brings us Madea". Booklist wrote that "tucked into all the silliness that is part of the character is some sound advice on life".
