= Tyler Perry Studios =

American film production studio in Atlanta, Georgia

- Type: Private
- Industry: Production studio
- Genre: Film, play and television shows
- Founded: 2006; 20 years ago
- Founder: Tyler Perry
- Headquarters: Atlanta, Georgia, United States
- Area served: United States
- Key people: Tyler Perry (CEO)
- Revenue: ▲US$907 million
- Owner: Tyler Perry
- Divisions: The Tyler Perry Foundation
- Subsidiaries: 34 Street Films; Peachtree & Vine
- Website: tylerperrystudios.com

Tyler Perry Studios (TPS) is a film studio in Atlanta, Georgia, founded by actor, filmmaker, and playwright Tyler Perry in 2006.

In 2019, Perry celebrated the grand opening of his newest Atlanta studio location, having purchased 330 acres (130 ha) of the former Fort McPherson complex in 2015 to make it the new home of Tyler Perry Studios. This established Perry as the first African-American to outright own a major film production studio. Through 34th Street Films, a production arm of Tyler Perry Studios, Perry guides the work of other filmmakers.

In 2018, Perry sold his previous studio location opened in 2008 to another minority-owned film production company. The previous studio location occupied two former Delta Air Lines affiliated buildings in the Greenbriar area of southwest Atlanta, and included 200,000 square feet (19,000 m^{2}) of sets and office space.

Tyler Perry Studios is a notable resource for Atlanta's economy. The company often advertises for film and crew positions at its southwest Atlanta location.

== History ==
Perry has full ownership of his films, and Lions Gate Entertainment used to serve as his distributor for all of his films starting from Diary of a Mad Black Woman to A Madea Family Funeral. After signing his deal with Paramount Global, Perry's films are now distributed by Paramount Pictures and Netflix starting with Nobody's Fool and A Fall from Grace. His first film, Diary of a Mad Black Woman, produced on a budget of $5.5 million, became an unexpected commercial success prompting widespread discussion among industry watchers about whether middle-class African-Americans were simply not being addressed by mainstream Hollywood movies. Its final gross box office receipts were $50.6 million, although it was critically panned scoring only 16 percent approval rating on the website Rotten Tomatoes. On its opening weekend, February 24, 2006, Perry's film version of Madea's Family Reunion opened at No. 1 with $30.3 million. The film eventually grossed $65 million and, like Diary, almost all of it in the United States. The film was jump-started by an hour-long appearance by Perry and his co-stars on the daily talk show The Oprah Winfrey Show.

His next project for Lionsgate, Daddy's Little Girls, starring British actor Idris Elba and Gabrielle Union was released in the United States on February 14, 2007. It grossed over $31 million. Perry wrote, directed, produced and starred in his next film, Why Did I Get Married?, which was released on October 12, 2007. It opened as the top-grossing movie in its first weekend, earning $21.4 million at the box office. It is loosely based on the play which Perry wrote in 2004. Filming began March 5, 2007, in Whistler, British Columbia, Vancouver, then Atlanta, where Perry opened his own studio. Janet Jackson, Sharon Leal, Jill Scott, and Tasha Smith appear in the film. Perry's 2008 film, Meet the Browns, which was released on March 21, opened at No. 2 with a $20,082,809 weekend gross. The Family That Preys opened on September 12, 2008, and grossed over $35.1 million as of October. Madea Goes to Jail opened at No. 1 on February 20, 2009, grossing $41 million and becoming his largest opening to date. This was Perry's seventh film with Lionsgate.

On May 1, 2012, a four-alarm fire engulfed portions of the studio complex, causing the partial collapse of one building. Less than three months later, another fire broke out on the roof of another building on the morning of August 27, 2012. On November 20, 2019, it hosted the MSNBC and Washington Post 2020 Democratic Party presidential debate on the Oprah Winfrey sound stage. It also hosted Miss Universe 2019 on December 8.

In October 2023, TPS signed a first look deal with Netflix to develop film and television projects.

In June 2021, Tyler Perry and T. D. Jakes announced they were purchasing over 130 acres in southwest Atlanta including a proposed expansion of Tyler Perry Studios for a public accessible entertainment district with theaters, retail shops, restaurants, and a Georgia film and TV museum. Perry is expecting the entertainment district to be completed in 2028. In February 2024, Perry announced his $800 million expansion project which included additional soundstages is temporarily on hold due to his concerns that rapid advances in video-related artificial intelligence could reduce demand for traditional filmmaking. Perry wants the filmmaking industry to galvanize as one voice and lobby for legislation to regulate artificial intelligence in Hollywood.

On December 6, 2024, Tyler Perry Studios president and general manager Steve Mensch died in a small plane crash. The single-engine Vans RV-12IS plane crashed and ended up upside down on a road in Homosassa, Florida.

=== Studio locations ===
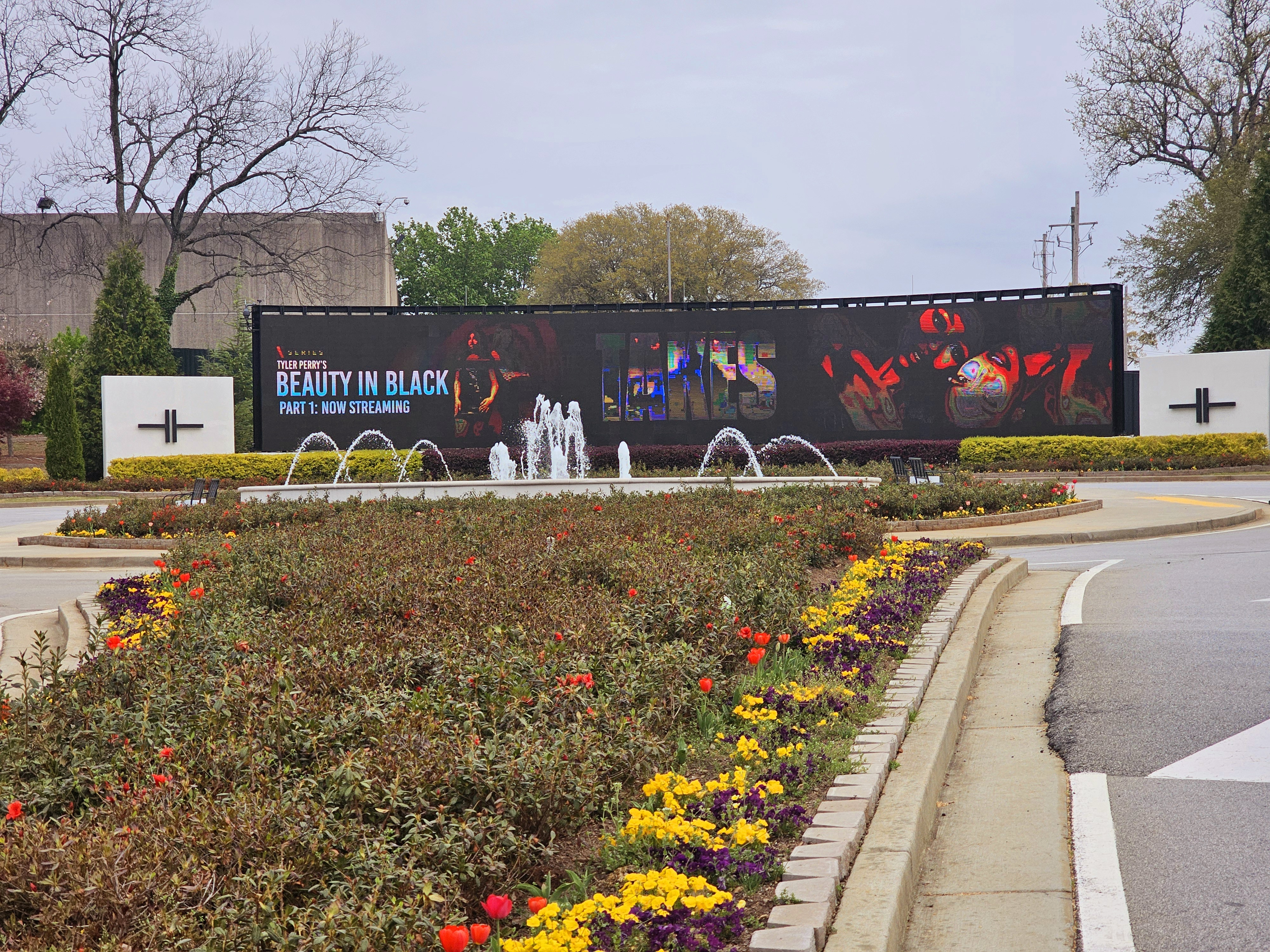
Tyler Perry Studios entrance

Before moving to its first southwest Atlanta location in 2008, the studios used the former studio space at 99 Krog Street in Inman Park on the BeltLine in central Atlanta. Perry had purchased the land from Atlanta Stage Works in 2006 for a reported $7 million. The studios were later converted into the Krog Street Market.

In 2019, Tyler Perry Studios officially moved into 330 acres (130 ha) of the former Fort McPherson complex in southwest Atlanta. The studio has 50,000 sq ft (4,600 m^{2}) of the site dedicated to standing permanent sets, including a replica of a luxury hotel lobby, a White House replica, a 16,000-square-foot (1,500 m^{2}) mansion, a mock cheap hotel, a trailer park set, and a real 1950s-style diner that was relocated from a town 100 miles (160 km) away. It has a residential neighborhood cul-de-sac with 12 homes, many of them with actual functioning interiors, furnished and decorated, not simply "facades." It also hosts 12 soundstages named after highly accomplished African-Americans in the entertainment industry.

Soundstages at Tyler Perry Studios
Number	Name	Size (square feet)
1	Oprah Winfrey soundstage	38,500 (154x252)
2	Whoopi Goldberg soundstage	20,000 (100x200)
3	Will Smith soundstage	20,000 (100x200)
4	Cicely Tyson soundstage	20,000 (100x200)
5	Diahann Carroll soundstage	20,000 (100x200)
6	Ruby Dee & Ossie Davis soundstage	10,000 (100x100)
7	John Singleton soundstage	20,000 (100x200)
8	Sidney Poitier soundstage	10,000 (100x100)
9	Harry Belafonte soundstage	20,000 (100x200)
10	Della Reese soundstage (name at left); Spike Lee soundstage (name at right)	20,000 (100x200)
11	Halle Berry soundstage	10,000 (100x100)
12	Denzel Washington soundstage	20,000 (100x200)

Sets

- Airplane
- Bank
- Baseball Fields
- Chapel
- County Jail
- Modern Courtroom
- Courtroom
- Coffee Shop
- Culdesac
- Classic Diner
- Farmhouse
- Historic District
- Lakeside Cabin
- Luxury Hotel
- Mansion
- Maxineville
- Motel
- Post Theatre
- Prison Yard
- Rustic Cabin
- Tennis Court
- Theatre
- Trailer Park
- White House
- The Dream Building
- Greenspace

== Film ==
- Diary of a Mad Black Woman (2005)
- Madea's Family Reunion (2006)
- Daddy's Little Girls (2007)
- Why Did I Get Married? (2007)
- Meet the Browns (2008)
- The Family That Preys (2008)
- Madea Goes to Jail (2009)
- I Can Do Bad All by Myself (2009)
- Why Did I Get Married Too? (2010)
- For Colored Girls (2010)
- Madea's Big Happy Family (2011)
- Good Deeds (2012)
- Madea's Witness Protection (2012)
- Temptation: Confessions of a Marriage Counselor (2013)
- A Madea Christmas (2013)
- The Single Moms Club (2014)
- Madea's Tough Love (2015)
- Boo! A Madea Halloween (2016)
- Boo 2! A Madea Halloween (2017)
- Acrimony (2018)
- Nobody's Fool (2018)
- A Madea Family Funeral (2019)
- A Fall from Grace (2020)
- A Madea Homecoming (2022)
- A Jazzman's Blues (2022)
- Mea Culpa (2024)
- Civil War (2024)
- Divorce in the Black (2024)
- The Six Triple Eight (2024)
- Duplicity (2025)
- Straw (2025)
- Madea's Destination Wedding (2025)
- Ruth & Boaz (2025)
- Finding Joy (2025)
- Joe's College Road Trip (2026)
- Scary Movie (2026)
- Strung (2026)

== Television ==
- House of Payne (2007–2012; 2020–present)
- Meet the Browns (2009–2011)
- For Better or Worse (2011–2017)
- The Haves and the Have Nots (2013–2021)
- Love Thy Neighbor (2013–2017)
- If Loving You Is Wrong (2014–2020)
- Too Close to Home (2016–2017)
- Divorce Court (2018–present)
- The Paynes (2018)
- The Oval (2019–present)
- Sistas (2019–present)
- Young Dylan (2020–2025)
- Ruthless (2020–present)
- Bruh (2020–2024)
- Assisted Living (2020–present)
- All the Queen's Men (2021–present)
- Hawkeye (2021)
- Zatima (2022–present)
- The Michael Blackson Show (2023)
- Caught Up (2023)
- Beauty in Black (2024–present)
- Family Feud (2024–present)
- Person, Place or Thing (2024–2025)
- Miss Governor (2025)
- Divorced Sistas (2025-present)
- Celebrity Family Feud (2025)

== See also ==
- Universal Studios Lot
- Walt Disney Studios (Burbank)
- Sony Pictures Studios

Preceded by Impact Arena (Thailand) Bangkok	Miss Universe venue 2019	Succeeded by The Guitar Hotel (United States) Hollywood, FL
