= David Mann (actor) =

American actor (born 1966)

David Mann Sr.
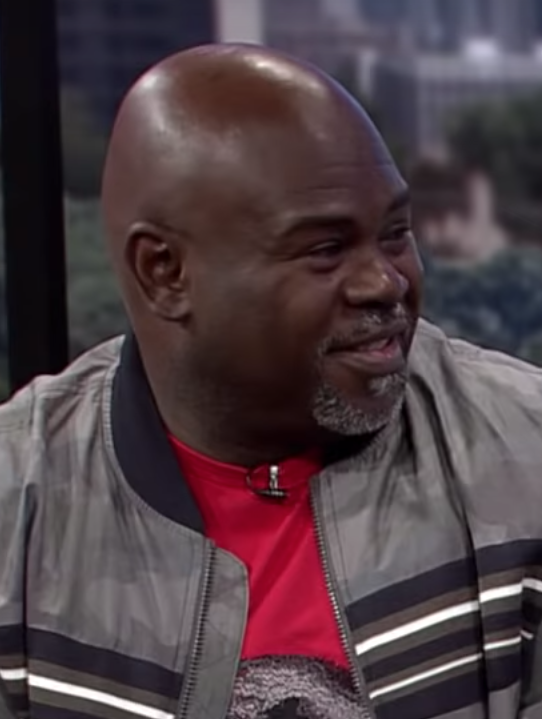
- Mann in 2018
- Born: August 7, 1966 (age 60); Fort Worth, Texas, US
- Occupations: Actor, singer
- Years active: 1992—present
- Spouse: Tamela Mann (m. 1988)
- Children: 4

David Anthony Mann Sr. (born August 7, 1966) is an American actor and gospel singer who has starred in many Tyler Perry plays, including I Can Do Bad All By Myself, Madea's Family Reunion, Madea's Class Reunion, Meet the Browns, and What's Done in the Dark. His character Mr. Brown is the father of Madea's daughter Cora (played by his real life wife, Tamela Mann). Mann also reprised his role as the character in the films Tyler Perry's Meet the Browns, Tyler Perry's Madea Goes to Jail, Madea's Big Happy Family, A Madea Homecoming and Madea's Destination Wedding.

Mann was born in Fort Worth, Texas, USA. He has been married to Tamela Mann since 1988; they were both previous members of Kirk Franklin's vocal ensemble "The Family" before working with Tyler Perry. In 2018, he and Tamela recorded a romantic soul album together called Us Against the World.

== Filmography ==
=== Film ===
Year	Title	Role	Notes
2008	Meet the Browns	Leroy Brown	
2009	Madea Goes to Jail	Leroy Brown	
2011	Madea's Big Happy Family	Leroy Brown	
2013	The Ultimate Life	Hobo Joe	
2014	First Impression	Pastor Johnson	
2018	Merry Wish-Mas	Jessie Jenkins	Also producer
2021	Soul Santa	Nicky	Also executive producer
2022	A Madea Homecoming	Leroy Brown	
2025	Madea's Destination Wedding	Leroy Brown	

=== Television ===
Year	Title	Role	Notes
2007–2008	Tyler Perry's House of Payne	Leroy Brown	Recurring role, 5 episodes
2009–2011	Meet the Browns	Leroy Brown	Series regular, 140 episodes NAACP Image Award for Outstanding Actor in a Comedy Series (2011)
2013	In the Meantime	Frankie	Television film
2015–2017	Mann & Wife	Daniel Mann	Series regular, 30 episodes, also executive producer
2015–2016	It's a Mann's World	Himself	Reality series, 20 episodes
2017	The Manns	Himself	Reality series, 10 episodes
2019–2021	The VeggieTales Show	Mr. Nezzer	Voice, 13 episodes role shared with Phil Vischer
2020–present	Tyler Perry's Assisted Living	Leroy Brown	Series regular

== Discography ==
- Mr. Brown's Good Ol' Time Church (2007)
- The Master Plan: Special Edition (with wife, Tamela Mann) (2010)
- Us Against The World: The Love Project (2018)

== Awards and nominations ==
=== Dove Awards ===
The Dove Awards are awarded annually by the Gospel Music Association. Mann has won 2 awards from 4 nominations.

Year	Nominated work	Award	Result
2011	Traditional Gospel Album of the Year	The Master Plan (as producer for Tamela Mann)	Won
2012	Grady Nutt Humor Award	Himself	Honored
2013	Traditional Gospel Album of the Year	Best Days (as producer for Tamela Mann)	Won
2017	Contemporary Gospel/Urban Album of the Year	One Way (as producer for Tamela Mann)	Nominated
2023	Contemporary Gospel Album of the Year	Overcomer Deluxe (as producer for Tamela Mann)	Nominated

=== NAACP Image Awards ===
The NAACP Image Awards are awarded annually by the National Association for the Advancement of Colored People (NAACP). Mann has won 3 awards from 3 nominations.

Year	Award	Nominated work	Result
2011	Outstanding Actor in a Comedy Series	Meet the Browns	Won
2018	Outstanding Reality Program/Reality Competition Series	The Manns	Won
2019	Outstanding Literary Work – Debut Author	Us Against the World: Our Secrets to Love, Marriage, and Family	Won

=== Stellar Awards ===
The Stellar Awards are awarded annually by SAGMA. Mann has won 1 award from 4 nominations.

Year	Award	Nominated work	Result
2008	Producer of the Year	Tamela Mann - The Live Experience (as producer for Tamela Mann)	Nominated
2017	Producer of the Year	One Way (as producer for Tamela Mann)	Won
2021	Music Video of the Year	"Touch from You" (as director for Tamela Mann)	Nominated
2025	Music Video of the Year	"Deserve to Win" (as director for Tamela Mann)	Nominated
