= Candy Coated Killahz =

Canadian musical group

- Origin: Toronto, Ontario, Canada
- Genres: Urban, Electro, Ghettotronic
- Years active: 2007–2011
- Labels: MapleMusic Recordings, Hot Steam Records (Independent)
- Members: Tasha Dash (Producer, Vocalist); Icon the Anomali (Vocalist); Danthrax (DJ, Co-producer)
- Website: candycoatedkillahz.com

Candy Coated Killahz were a Canadian musical group from Toronto, Ontario, known for their blend of hip-hop, R&B, and electronic styles, a sound that the group termed "Ghettotronic". Hailed by The Globe and Mail as one of the bands responsible for Toronto's emergence as a "music capital", original group members Tasha Dash and Icon the Anomali released their debut album It Factor in 2008 after becoming a staple in Toronto's Queen West music scene, and soon came into national visibility in 2009 with their debut single "Playboy". Following the single's success at radio and its appearance in Tyler Perry's blockbuster movie, I Can Do Bad All By Myself, CCK added DJ Danthrax, the third member, and together the group wrote and produced the second album, Neon Black (released July 2011). Singles include "Neon Black" (remixed by DJ Green Lantern, Che Vicious, and Bonjay) and "Light Up This City".

== Band and history ==
=== Band formation ===
Band members Icon the Anomali and Tasha Dash met while working at a downtown Toronto restaurant in their late teens. At the time, both were working on solo projects which were put on hold after the two began writing together. With Tasha as producer, the group's sound quickly evolved from street hip hop to a sound the group has termed "Ghettotronic" a blend of hip hop, old school dance, and electronic.

=== Band members ===
==== Tasha Schumann ====
One of the industry's few female music producers, Tasha Schumann, was the band's producer, co-writer, and front woman. A classically trained pianist, and multi-instrumentalist, she sometimes performs under the stage name "Tasha Dash". Originally from Kitchener-Waterloo, Ontario, she grew up playing in rock bands and moved to Toronto after high school because of a lack of "opportunities to do hip-hop and electronic" in her hometown. The German-Jamaican musician often cites groups such as Outkast, TLC, 2Unlimited, and No Doubt as influences for her production style.

==== Michael "Icon the Anomali" Akinlabi ====
Nigerian-born, Michael Ayodeji Akinlabi, is CCK frontman and performs under the stage name Icon the Anomali. Also a comic book creator, and video-game designer, Icon has cited Michael Jackson as a major inspiration.

== Discography ==
=== Studio recordings ===
- Neon Black (2011), MapleMusic Recordings & Hot Steam Records
- It Factor (2008), Hot Steam Records (Independent)
- Bloodsugar: The Mixtape (2007), Hot Steam Records (Independent)

=== Singles ===
- "Light Up This City" - Written by T.Schumann, M.Akinlabi, D. Hartrell, Produced by D. Hartrell & T. Schumann
- "Neon Black" - Written by T.Schumann, M. Akinlabi, D. Hartrell, Produced by T. Schumann & D. Hartrell
- "Playboy" - Written by T.Schumann & M. Akinlabi, Produced by T. Schumann
