= Joe's College Road Trip =

2026 film by Tyler Perry

- Official release poster
- Directed by: Tyler Perry
- Written by: Tyler Perry
- Produced by: Yolanda T. Cochran; Angi Bones; Tyler Perry
- Starring: Tyler Perry; Jermaine Harris; Amber Reign Smith; Millie Jackson
- Cinematography: Michael Watson
- Edited by: Storm Evans
- Music by: Dara Taylor
- Production company: Tyler Perry Studios
- Distributed by: Netflix
- Release date: February 13, 2026
- Running time: 111 minutes
- Country: United States
- Language: English

Joe's College Road Trip is a 2026 American road comedy film written, directed by and starring Tyler Perry. While part of the Madea franchise, it is the first of its films to be about her brother Joe. In the film, he accompanies his grandson B.J. on a college road trip.

The film was released on February 13, 2026, by Netflix.

== Plot ==
B.J. is graduating high school and deciding where to continue his education. His friends from his private school, both white, try to peer pressure B.J. into going to Pepperdine University, laughing off the suggestion of the latter attending the HBCU Morehouse College (despite him being accepted) because "there's no need for black colleges" at this point in history. The boys decide they're going to take a road trip to California to tour the Pepperdine campus.

His father Brian hears this and immediately goes to his aunt Madea's house for help, desperate and willing to enact on whatever she says to do. She suggests that Joe, her brother and Brian's father, will take B.J. on the college road trip. Despite Joe's extremist parenting (which he also plans to use on B.J.), Brian reluctantly agrees & convinces his son to go with it under the ruse that his grandfather is dying of diseases.

Instead of taking his grandson's electric car, they take Ruby, Joe's Buick convertible, and most of B.J.'s essentials are thrown away before they set off to California. They first stop in Tennessee on Beale Street where they meet an old friend of Joe's, Geraldine, and stop by a motel for the night atferwards.

The two leave Tennessee the next morning, with Joe teaching B.J. how to drive Ruby. After stopping by more locations and ending up in a bar fight, they make their way to a whorehouse in Texas, run by Pearl. Joe and Pearl hook up B.J. with one of her employees, Destiny. She reveals to B.J. she had been trafficked and just wants to leave Texas. He takes her with them, but Joe eventually kicks them out of the car, fed up with B.J. calling him out on his misogyny and rude behavior. B.J. and Destiny stay at a motel, where she discovers he had been to numerous historic locations in Black history.

Meanwhile, Joe discovers the gang trafficking Destiny is after her, and on Brian's orders, finds B.J. and Destiny at a library, where the latter brought the former to learn more about Black history. On their way to leave town, they are pursued by the gang, who eventually run off after a team of police arrive, with Brian leading the charge. Brian offers to take B.J. home, but the latter, realizing he should attend Morehouse after all, politely turns down the offer and takes Joe and Destiny to Las Vegas instead.

== Cast ==
- Tyler Perry as:
  - Joe Simmons, the brother of Madea, the father of Brian, and the grandfather of B.J.
  - Brian Simmons, the father of B.J., the son of Joe, and the nephew of Madea
  - Madea, a tough old lady who is the sister of Joe, the aunt of Brian, and the great-aunt of B.J.
- Jermaine Harris as B.J. Simmons, the son of Brian, the grandson of Joe, and the grandnephew of Madea
- Amber Reign Smith as Destiny
- Millie Jackson as Geraldine
- Bethany Anne Lind as Vikki
- Jeremy Gimenez as Garrett
- Wil Deusner as Stewart
- Ms. Pat as Pearl

== Production ==
Filming occurred in Las Cruces, New Mexico in January 2024, and also in Memphis, Tennessee that same month, as well as in Clarksdale, Mississippi.

== Release ==
Joe's College Road Trip was released on Netflix on February 13, 2026.

== Reception ==
On the review aggregator website Rotten Tomatoes, 42% of 12 critics' reviews are positive.
