= Diary of a Mad Black Woman =

2005 film directed by Darren Grant

- Theatrical release poster
- Directed by: Darren Grant
- Written by: Tyler Perry
- Based on: Diary of a Mad Black Woman by Tyler Perry
- Produced by: Reuben Cannon; Tyler Perry
- Starring: Kimberly Elise; Steve Harris; Shemar Moore; Cicely Tyson; Tyler Perry
- Cinematography: David Claessen
- Edited by: Terilyn A. Shropshire
- Music by: Elvin D. Ross; Tyler Perry
- Production companies: Lions Gate Films; The Tyler Perry Company; BET Pictures; Reuben Cannon Productions
- Distributed by: Lions Gate Films
- Release date: February 25, 2005
- Running time: 116 minutes
- Country: United States
- Language: English
- Budget: $5.5 million
- Box office: $50.7 million

Diary of a Mad Black Woman is a 2005 American romantic comedy drama film directed by Darren Grant and written by Tyler Perry. Inspired by the play of the same name, it marks Perry's feature film debut and is the first entry in the Madea film franchise. Starring Perry alongside Kimberly Elise, Steve Harris, Shemar Moore, and Cicely Tyson, it tells the story of a woman who is thrown out of her house by her husband on their 18th wedding anniversary and subsequently moves in with her grandmother, and is the only film written, but not directed, by Perry.

Filmed in Atlanta and Fairburn, Georgia, and released theatrically by Lionsgate Films on February 25, 2005, the film grossed $50.6 million in North America. The sequel, Madea's Family Reunion, was released on February 24, 2006.

== Plot ==
Helen Simmons-McCarter and her attorney husband Charles are successful and wealthy. However, Charles is distant and controlling, while Helen is unemployed, and deals with loneliness in attempting to progress their marriage. On the evening of their eighteenth wedding anniversary, Helen arrives to their mansion to find all her belongings in a U-Haul by truck driver Orlando, discovering Charles is divorcing her and planning to marry Brenda, his young mistress and the mother of his two sons.

Helen kicks out Orlando from his truck, and visits her grandmother Madea, in which Helen's presence angers her brother Joe. The subsequent day, Madea and Helen vandalize the mansion, where Madea uses a chainsaw to destroy the furniture in the living room; including causing the lamps to subtly short circuit and the piano to collapse as the day approaches its end. Madea's nephew Brian defends her and Helen, as Judge Mablean Ephriam places Madea, a repeat offender, under house arrest and sets a $5,000 property or cash bond for Helen.

Career criminal Jamison Milton Jackson requests Charles to defend him in his trial for shooting an undercover cop during a drug deal. He gives Charles $300,000 for both attorney's fee and to bribe the judge to rule in his favor. Helen and her mother Myrtle, visits church service on one Sunday, where Cora leads song with the choir. Brian kicks his addict wife Debrah out of their home, causing him to have a strained relationship with their daughter Tiffany, who wants to join the same church choir. Brian visits his father Joe and aunt Madea, to tell of his predicament. Madea suggests him that Tiffany joining the choir is not guaranteed to lead to drug addiction, also encouraging him to also fix his relationship with Debrah.

In divorce court, Helen allows Charles retain all the money and property, to pay Brian's attorney fees and to continue paying for her mother Myrtle Jean's stay in a nursing home in which Charles agrees to both terms. In the shooting case, despite Charles' efforts, the jury convicts Jamison. While being escorted out of the courtroom, Jamison snatches the bailiff's gun and shoots Charles in the back for failing to get him acquitted.

Orlando proposes to Helen, but before she can respond, she notices and overhears a news report on the shooting and rushes to the hospital with Brian, where they encounter Brenda upon arriving. The doctor explains Charles could permanently be paralyzed from the waist down and asks if he should be resuscitated should his health deteriorate. Brenda declines, feeling that if he survives but cannot walk, he will spend the rest of his life using a wheelchair, but Helen, still Charles's legal wife, instructs the doctor to do everything possible to ensure his survival.

Charles is discharged from the hospital and returns home with Helen. Charles begins to argue, with Helen using this to retaliate for years of neglect and abuse. She physically assaults him and discloses that Brenda had opted Charles to die, emptied his bank account and departed with their sons during his hospitalization. She additionally reveals that their housekeeper Christina also left, as Brenda left no money to pay her, and that all of Charles' close companions abandoned him. Helen continues her retaliation throughout the next time period, where she eventually suffers from guilt.

After Helen and Orlando argue about her moving back in with Charles to look after him, he departs heartbroken. Regretting his past treatment of Helen, Charles apologizes to her, and tells her that she was the only person who truly cared about him. She assists in his recovery. One Sunday in church service, Reverend Carter, Tiffany, and Cora leads song with the choir, where Charles regains his ability to walk, while Debrah enters in, celebrating her sobriety, as she reconciles with Brian, alongside embraces with Helen and Charles. Charles seeks to begin his relationship anew with Helen, but during a family dinner with Madea, she gives him her wedding ring and signed divorce papers and says they will always be friends, amicably ending their marriage. She ventures to Orlando's workplace, reaffirms that she loves him, requests that he propose again, and accepts when he does.

== Cast ==
- Kimberly Elise as Helen Simmons-McCarter, a woman who is the soon-to-be ex-wife of Charles.
- Steve Harris as Charles McCarter, a successful lawyer.
- Shemar Moore as Orlando, a moving truck driver.
- Tamara Taylor as Debrah, Brian's drug-addicted wife.
- Cicely Tyson as Myrtle Simmons, Helen's mother.
- Tyler Perry as:
  - Mabel "Madea" Simmons, a tough old lady and Helen's paternal grandmother
  - Joe Simmons, Madea's brother.
  - Brian Simmons, a lawyer who is Madea's nephew and Joe's son.
- Lisa Marcos as Brenda Marcos, Charles' mistress.
- Tiffany Evans as Tiffany, Brian's daughter.
- Avery Knight as BJ, Brian's son
- Gary Anthony Sturgis as Jamison Milton Jackson, a career criminal.
- Chandra Currelley as herself
- Judge Mablean Ephriam as herself
- Tamela Mann as Cora Simmons, a choir member at the church Helen attends who is revealed to be Madea's daughter in other works.

== Soundtrack ==
The soundtrack was released by Motown Records on April 19, 2005.

Track listing
No.	Title	Performer(s)	Length
1.	"Purify Me"	India.Arie	4:07
2.	"Sick & Tired"	Monica	4:19
3.	"Different Directions"	Angie Stone	3:39
4.	"Things I Collected"	Tamia	5:37
5.	"I Wanna Swing"	Cheryl Pepsii Riley	2:25
6.	"I Wanna Love Again"	Chandra Currelley	4:44
7.	"Fallen in Love"	Darlene McCoy	4:28
8.	"Ain't It Funny"	Heather Headley	4:03
9.	"One of Us"	Cheryl Pepsii Riley	3:31
10.	"I Wanna Be Free"	Patti LaBelle	4:56
11.	"Father, Can You Hear Me"	Tiffany Evans, Cheryl Pepsii Riley, Tamela J. Mann, Chandra Currelley, Terrell Carter, & Anya Washington	4:12
12.	"Take It to Jesus"	Tamela J. Mann	2:57

== Release ==
The film was released on DVD and VHS June 28, 2005, by Lions Gate Home Entertainment.

== Reception ==
=== Box office ===
On its opening weekend, the film arrived at number 1 on the box office rankings, with takings of $21.9 million. The film grossed an estimated $50.6 million in the United States and Canada, with an additional $19,000 internationally, for an estimated worldwide total of $50.7 million.

=== Critical response ===
On the review aggregator website Rotten Tomatoes, 15% of 112 critics' reviews are positive. The website's consensus reads: "Tyler Perry's successful play can't make the move to the screen; this mix of slapstick, melodrama and spirituality lacks a consistent tone." Metacritic, which uses a weighted average, assigned the film a score of 36 out of 100, based on 30 critics, indicating "generally unfavorable" reviews. Audience polled by CinemaScore gave the film a rare "A+" grade, on a scale from A-F.

Roger Ebert gave the film one out of four stars, arguing that the Madea character "is not remotely plausible [and] not merely wrong for the movie, but fatal to it." Ebert also wrote that Elise, Tyson and Harris offered effective performances and that "[t]here's a good movie buried beneath the bad one."

== Sequel ==
A sequel to the film, Madea's Family Reunion, was released on February 24, 2006.
