= Ryan Gentles (actor) =

American actor

- Occupations: Film, stage actor

Ryan Gentles is an American actor who has worked with Tyler Perry studios in several stage plays and movies including Madea Goes to Jail playing Nate, Sonny's boss and Vanessa's boyfriend. He also made an appearance in the movie version of "Madea's Family Reunion" as a stripper. He appeared In the stage play What's Done in the Dark and was Jennifer Hudson's love interest in her hit video "Spotlight". Gentles made his theatrical debut in E. Lynn Harris' play Not a Day Goes By in which he played Zurich, a sports agent. Gentles has also appears in stage plays by John Ruffin and TJ Hemphill and is a regular celebrity trainer and personality on the annual Tom Joyner Fantastic Voyage.
