= Meet the Browns (film) =

2008 American romance film

- Theatrical release poster
- Directed by: Tyler Perry
- Written by: Tyler Perry
- Based on: Meet the Browns by Tyler Perry
- Produced by: Tyler Perry; Reuben Cannon
- Starring: Angela Bassett; Sofia Vergara; Margaret Avery; Frankie Faison; Jenifer Lewis; Lance Gross; Rick Fox; Lamman Rucker; Tamela Mann; David Mann; Tyler Perry
- Cinematography: Sandi Sissel
- Edited by: Maysie Hoy
- Music by: Aaron Zigman
- Production company: Tyler Perry Studios
- Distributed by: Lionsgate
- Release date: March 21, 2008
- Running time: 108 minutes
- Country: United States
- Language: English
- Budget: $20 million
- Box office: $42 million

Meet the Browns is a 2008 American romantic comedy-drama film released by Lionsgate on March 21, 2008. The film was based on the play of the same name by Tyler Perry and is the third film in the Madea cinematic universe. It was written and directed by Tyler Perry with Ruben Cannon helping with the writing, and starring Angela Bassett, Sofia Vergara, Margaret Avery, Frankie Faison, Jenifer Lewis, Lance Gross, Rick Fox, Lamman Rucker, Tamela Mann, Tyler Perry, and introducing David Mann in his film debut as Leroy Brown. The film tells the story of a struggling single mother from Chicago who takes her children to Senoia, Georgia to attend her long-lost father's funeral and meets the relatives she didn't know she had. The film grossed $42 million.

== Plot ==
In Chicago, Brenda Brown-Davis is the struggling single mother of Mike Jr., Lena, and Tosha. She receives a letter saying that the father she has never met died and his funeral will be in Georgia. The plant where she works with her friend Cheryl "relocates its business to Mexico" adding to her existing financial difficulties. Then Miss Mildred, who supervises Lena in her home daycare, will not continue watching her due to the fact that Brenda has not been paying her.

Basketball scout Harry notices Mike Jr. playing well at a game and comes to their house to talk about the boy's future. Harry asks Brenda out, but she has no interest in hearing about her son going professional and walks away. She begs Miss Mildred to watch Lena and goes to see her ex with Cheryl for financial help. Mike Sr., who has never given Brenda any assistance, says no and Brenda runs after Cheryl throws a brick at him.

Brenda takes her children to Senoia, Georgia to attend the funeral and meets her estranged half-siblings, in which the Cora Simmons and Leroy Brown takes the lead roles. Cora is revealed to be the daughter of Madea Simmons. Brenda is surprised to notice Harry, who resides in the same town and is friendly with her father's family members LB, Sarah, Vera, and Will. Harry partakes in a basketball game with Mike Jr. and Will.

At dinner, Brenda learns that LB was the only one who knew about her when she shows the letter to Vera. On his deathbed, Pop confessed to LB that he was a pimp in Chicago. Brenda's mother who was LB's mother and many of Pop's friends, the children had all known, were his prostitutes, much to the shock of the rest of the Browns. The family welcomes Brenda, offering support and encouragement. After the funeral, they learn that Pop Brown left an old house to Brenda in his will. Brenda decides not to move in there, despite Harry's suggestion that she should stay.

Brenda returns to Chicago, where Mike Sr. offers money in exchange for a one-night stand. After Brenda rejects him, Mike Jr. overhears Mike Sr. insulting her and storms out. Trying to make money and help, Mike Jr. turns to Calvin, a friend who deals drugs. Harry sees them together and suspects something is wrong. He counsels Mike Jr. and goes home with him, to explain the situation to Brenda. She threatens to kick Mike Jr. out if he starts dealing drugs. Mike Jr. realizes the risks involved in drug dealing would let his family down and promises to not do it.

When Harry and Brenda leave for a date, Mike Jr. tells Calvin that he has changed his mind and returns the drugs. Rival drug dealers arrive and attack Calvin for selling on their turf. Mike Jr. is shot and wounded when he runs away at Calvin's urging.

After Mike Jr. recovers, Harry asks the Browns for help to get Pop Brown's run-down house for Brenda and her kids as they renovate the house and surprise her. Brenda overhears Vera talking to Sarah suggesting that Harry only dates Brenda to get his "perks" from helping Mike Jr.

Later during the night, Leroy prompts Cora to view the news broadcast of a high-speed chase, which involves Madea and Joe Simmons, in which Madea calls Cora on the phone, with Cora and Leroy prompting to use bail money to help Madea, before the phone conversation quickly ends. While the broadcast is occurring, it is another setting, where Brenda confronts Harry, who asserts that his recent contributions are for sincere purposes. Brenda still diverges her relationship with Harry, due to the appearances to be of relentless gambling and the alike. It is short periods later during the night, where Mr. Brown and Cora view the subsequent scene of the broadcast, where Madea is eventually arrested. Madea brutally assaults the officers, with Joe secretly avoiding and escaping the scene.

A basketball league representative visits Brenda and offers Mike Jr. a million-dollar contract; Brenda learns that Harry referred them without asking for any money. On the day Mike Jr. signs his contract, Mike Sr. arrives to be photographed with his ex and son. However, Mike Jr. announces to the press that he does not know his father, and that his mother raised him without support.

While leaving, Mike Jr. tells Brenda that Harry is a good man and more of a father figure than his actual father. Brenda goes to see Harry and they reconcile. The two eventually marry, and the Browns attend the wedding.

== Cast ==
- Angela Bassett as Brenda Brown, a struggling single mother.
- Rick Fox as Harry Belton, a basketball scout.
- David Mann as Mr. Leroy Brown, the patriarch of the Brown family in Georgia and the brother of Larry and Vera.
- Tamela Mann as Cora Simmons, the daughter of Leroy Brown.
- Margaret Avery as Sarah Brown, the wife of Larry Brown.
- Frankie Faison as Larry "L.B." Brown, the husband of Sarah, the half-brother of Brenda, and the oldest of Pop Brown's children.
- Jenifer Lewis as Vera Brown, the sister of Larry and the half-sister of Brenda who is the self-proclaimed "baby of the family".
- Lance Gross as Michael Rhodes Jr., the son of Brenda who plays basketball.
- Sofía Vergara as Cheryl Barranquilla, a friend of Brenda.
- Lamman Rucker as Will Brown, the son of Vera Brown and the nephew of Leroy Brown who is an aspiring gynecologist.
- Tyler Perry as:
  - Mabel "Madea" Simmons, a tough old lady and the mother of Cora.
  - Joe Simmons, the brother of Madea and uncle of Cora.
- Phillip Van Lear as Michael Rhodes Sr., the biological father of Michael Rhodes Jr.
- Kristopher Lofton as Calvin, a friend of Michael Rhodes Jr. who is a drug dealer.
- Mariana Tolbert as Lena Rhodes, the daughter of Brenda.
- Chloe Bailey as Tosha Brown, the daughter of Brenda.
- Brandon Richardson as Officer Thompson
- Irma P. Hall as Miss Mildred, Brenda's neighbor who runs a daycare.
- LaVan Davis as Henry, a bus driver.

== Production ==
Meet the Browns completed filming on October 26, 2007, after beginning on July 12 the same year.

== Stageplay ==
The film is based on certain plot points of its namesake, while majority of the storyline comes from the 2006 play, What's Done in the Dark.

== Television series ==
Meet the Browns aired on TBS starring David Mann and Tamela Mann. The show's plot is different from the play and movie. Mr. Brown has opened up a senior citizens' home with the help of Cora, his nephew Will and his wife Sasha. Storylines involve the various zany residents of the home. The series, however, is a spin-off of the film, the stageplay and three episodes of Tyler Perry's House of Payne where Mann guest-starred as Mr. Brown, who learns that his deceased father states in his will that he wants him to open a senior citizens' home. Brown enlists the help of the Paynes, Cora, and Will. The other characters from the play and film are neither mentioned nor seen. However, Brown's sister Vera made a guest appearance in the third season of the series.

== Critical reception ==
The film received mixed reviews from critics. Review aggregator Rotten Tomatoes gives the film a 33% approval rating based on 58 reviews. The site's critics consensus reads: "Angela Bassett's considerable charms can't compensate for Meet the Browns' incessant melodrama and scattered narrative threads." Metacritic reported the film had an average score of 45 out of 100, based on 14 reviews. Audiences polled by CinemaScore gave the film an average grade of "A" on an A+ to F scale.

== Box office ==
In its opening weekend, the film grossed an estimated $20 million in 2,006 theaters in the United States and Canada, ranking #2 at the box office behind Horton Hears a Who!. Although the film ranked second at the box office, it ranked first in average gross per theater, grossing $9,977 per theater compared to Horton's $6,336 per theater. When the film ended its run at the box office, it had grossed $41,975,388 over its $20 million budget, making the film a success.

== Soundtrack ==
The soundtrack was released by Atlantic Records on March 18, 2008.

=== Track list ===
1. People Everyday (Metamorphosis Mix) – Musiq Soulchild feat. Estelle
2. Face To Face – Coko & Case
3. Sweeter – Gerald Levert
4. Dig This – Brandy
5. I'll Take You There – Kelly Price
6. Love Again – Kelly Rowland
7. This Gift – Deborah Cox
8. Angel – Chaka Khan
9. Alright – Ledisi
10. Unify – Wynter Gordon
11. My Love – Jill Scott
12. Hallelujah – Tamela Mann

== Blu-ray / DVD release ==
Tyler Perry's Meet the Browns was sold in 1-disc and 2-disc DVD and Blu-ray on July 1, 2008. DVD sales have so far gathered $17,810,803 in revenue.
