= I Can Do Bad All by Myself (play) =

Play written by Tyler Perry

Tyler Perry's I Can Do Bad All by Myself
- Original language: English
- Written by: Tyler Perry
- Characters: Madea, Vianne, Bobby, Maylee, Anthony, Cora, Mr. Brown and Keisha
- Genre: Comedy-Drama
- Setting: Madea's Home

Premiere
- Date: September 28, 1999
- Place: Chicago

Tyler Perry's I Can Do Bad All by Myself is a 1999 American stage play written, directed, and produced by and starring Tyler Perry. The play marks the first official appearance of the well-known fictional character Madea, whom Perry portrays. Although the original production was not recorded, the live performance released on DVD and VHS was recorded in Washington, D.C., at the Lincoln Theatre in August 2002.

== Introduction ==
This show started its tour in September 1999 in Chicago and is scheduled through fall of 2000.

This comedy is just that, a story of a woman fighting to hold on to her husband, not knowing that he has moved in with her sister.

The play uses the motto, "We Fight So Hard to Hold on to the Things that God, Himself, is Trying to Tear Apart". It features Madea, a character portrayed by Tyler Perry, and followed Perry's earlier stage production I Know I've Been Changed.

When it started its tour, this show played only five select cities. It was at this time that the show streaked its claim as the one to see in 2000. It will also be touring through 2001.

== Synopsis ==
Vianne, a woman who has seen her share of pain, moves in with her 78-year-old grandmother, Madea, in order to escape her verbally abusive husband. Soon after her departure, she is hit with divorce papers.

When Madea (played by Mr. Perry) takes sick, the family comes to her rescue, including Vianne's younger sister, Maylee. However, Maylee casually strolls in and announces that she will soon marry Vianne's ex-husband.

After an explosive argument at the dinner table, Vianne realizes that she has to let this man go. Even though they are divorced, he still has her in his heart. No sooner than she lets him go, she realizes that her hurt has consumed most of her life and she needs to change.

Bobby, a hired handyman (and boarder) lives with the grandmother, and he immediately makes it known that he is interested in Vianne. Much to their reluctance, they start to spend time together and they realize that, even though she was once a rich suburban housewife and he, a lowly gardener and ex-convict; that when it's right, it's right. Although grandma Madea has a few things to say about their budding relationship, including "You Can Do Bad All By Yourself", she eventually encourages it.

Later, a shocking family secret is revealed which allows Vianne and Maylee to come to terms with their family's dark past. Only then are they able to forgive one another and move on with their lives.

== DVD Plot ==
=== Act One ===
Vianne, who is in the middle of settling a bitter divorce with her ex-husband Anthony, a successful stockbroker, has moved in with her grandmother, Mabel "Madea" Simmons. Madea is sick with complications from her diabetes. Another person Madea is helping out is Bobby, an ex-con. Bobby is Madea's handyman and usually cuts her grass. Both Madea and Vianne find him attractive, though Vianne would not like to admit it.

Vianne's niece, Keisha, is also staying with Madea. Keisha's mother, Maylee, shows up at her school wearing a blond wig and a mini-skirt, embarrassing Keisha. Maylee later pops up at the house, announcing her engagement to none other than Vianne's ex-husband, Anthony.

Keisha is resentful towards her mother for being away for so long. When Anthony calls, Maylee drops everything to assist him, leaving Keisha alone (Motherless Child).

Madea's daughter, Cora, arrives, announcing she only stays for the weekend as she lives out of town. Keisha confided in her aunt about her troubles with the kids at school, as they all bullied her except for one kid named Kelly. Madea's next-door neighbor, Mr. Brown, also drops by and brings in her mail.

While everyone is preparing for dinner, Bobby, taking a shower, runs downstairs to get soap. While Bobby and Vianne flirt with each other, Madea can tell that Vianne secretly likes him. Dinner tensions are high as Bobby and Anthony debate their religious beliefs, and Anthony insults Madea. The family then reminisces over their time in the church choir, singing old gospel favorites (Old Time Mix).

Tensions blew soon after Anthony started insulting Vianne. Maylee and Vianne then have a spat of their own. This leads a hurt Vianne to pull a knife on Anthony, alarming everybody. The entire family disperses, except Cora, who tries to calm Vianne down. Vianne, left with all the rubble of the night, tries to reflect (Lord, I'm Sorry).

=== Act Two ===
Bobby returns, flirting with Vianne, and tells her his story of how he was incarcerated. Vianne opens up about her past relationships and newfound doubts while Bobby assures her their relationship will be different (Let Me Hold You).

A school nurse calls Maylee about Keisha. Anthony tells Maylee that she must either choose between their daughter, convinced she'd hinder his lifestyle. When Keisha arrives home, Maylee orders her to put her stuff down as they will go to the clinic. Keisha is pregnant with the neighbor boy, Kelly's child. Maylee insists she has an abortion. Cora tries to get through to her, but Maylee will not have it. It is revealed that Keisha was the product of a rape that Maylee endured at 13 at the hands of a man her mother let use her for drug money. With that, Maylee forces Keisha out of the house, and Cora is left alone, praying for her family's saving (In the Name of Jesus).

Madea gets a call from Eric Jones offering Bobby a job and relays the message to Bobby and Vianne. When Maylee and Keisha return from the clinic, Madea admonishes them. It is, however, too late, as Keisha is too far gone to get an abortion.

Vianne tries to get Maylee to understand that Anthony does not love her and that he is only marrying her to retaliate against Vianne. Maylee, upset, refuses to believe her. Bobby tells everyone about his job offer in California as Head Foreman but is reluctant to accept.

Vianne and Bobby force Madea upstairs as they talk about their future. Bobby wants marriage and kids, but Vianne does not see it for her right now. As they talk, the doorbell rings, and Mr. Brown is mad at Madea for giving his dog sleeping pills. Madea and Brown get into a light insulting match, leaving Vianne and Bobby to call the vet.

The next day, while Bobby is packing his bags, he runs into Anthony. Anthony tries to turn Bobby against Vianne, again insulting her weight. Bobby tells Anthony that Vianne never loved him. Anthony threatens Bobby to move away to California and leave Vianne alone for good. If he stays here, Anthony will call his probation officer and send him back to prison, seeing as they're old friends.

Police sirens are then heard, and Madea enters, running upstairs. Madea and Maylee were out getting their nails done when the nail salon employees began talking about Madea. One employee, in particular, insulted her, comparing her to Godzilla. So, she shot up the nail salon and hightailed home. Maylee comes back, angrily relaying the details to the boys.

Bobby debates whether to stay or take the job offer in California. Vianne tells him to follow his heart. Bobby realizes he wants to stay with Vianne even though she says she's not ready for a relationship. However, Bobby still walks out the door and heads for California. Madea tells Vianne that she needs to go after her man. After a few minutes of hesitation, Vianne decides to chase Bobby down before he leaves. However, when Vianne opens the door, Bobby is revealed to be standing right there. Bobby comes inside and proposes to Vianne, and under Madea's direction, she agrees.

Vianne drives Madea off to the casino. Maylee congratulates Bobby on the proposal, though she is admittedly jealous of their relationship. Cora reconciles Maylee and Keisha (It's Gonna Be Hallelujah).

Later that day, Maylee brings Anthony his bags and tells him he will drive home alone. Once Anthony leaves, Maylee apologizes to Vianne for everything. Cora gathers the family to reflect on all of the insight they've gained despite all that has caused them pain in the past (God is the Answer).

== Cast ==
Character	1999 Original Cast	2000 Cast	2002 Film Cast
Madea	Tyler Perry	Tyler Perry	Tyler Perry
Vianne	Kisha Grandy	Kisha Grandy	Kisha Grandy
Bobby	Tyga Graham	Tyga Graham	Tyga Graham
Maylee	Tosha Moore	Terri Brown-Britton	Donna Stewart
Anthony	Carl Pertile	Carl Pertile	Carl Pertile
Mr. Brown	David Mann	David Mann	David Mann
Cora	Tamela Mann	Tamela Mann	Tamela Mann
Keisha	-		Elaine O'Neale

== 1999 Original Band ==
- Elvin Ross – Musical Director/Keyboards
- Mike Frazier – Bass
- Sheryl Harper – Drums
- John Forbes – Keyboards
- Jim Gorst – Sound
- Davie Holmbo – Sound

== 2000 Live Band ==
- Elvin Ross – Musical Director/Keyboards
- Mike Frazier – Bass
- Erick Morgan – Drums
- Jerome Harmon – Keyboards
- Jim Gorst – Sound
- Davie Holmbo – Sound

== 2002 Band Film ==
- Elvin Ross – Musical Director/Keyboards
- Mike Frazier – Bass
- Erick Morgan – Drums
- John Forbes – Keyboards
- Jim Gorst – Sound
- Davie Holmbo – Sound

== Musical Numbers ==
All songs written and/or produced by Tyler Perry and Elvin D. Ross.

=== Original 1999 Production ===
==== Act One ====
- "Overture" - Band
- "I Can Do Bad All By Myself" - Vianne & Company
- "Old Time Mix (consisting of Angels Watching Over Me / There's a Leak in This Old Building / I Know the Lord Will Make a Way)" – Anthony, Maylee, Vianne, and Company
- "Silver & Gold" or "Bye Baby" - Vianne

==== Act Two ====
- "Let Me Hold You" - Bobby
- "It's Gonna Be Hallelujah" - Cora
- "Lord, I'm Sorry" - Maylee
- "Bye Baby (Reprise)" - Madea
- "Kirk Franklin & The Family Medley" - Cora, Brown, Vianne & Company

=== Taped 2002 Performance ===
==== Act One ====
- "Overture / I Can Do Bad All By Myself" - Band & Company
- "Motherless Child" – Keisha
- "Old Time Mix (consisting of Angels Watching Over Me / There's a Leak in This Old Building / I Know the Lord Will Make a Way)" – Brown, Maylee, Vianne, Cora and Company
- "Lord, I'm Sorry" – Vianne

==== Act Two ====
- "Let Me Hold You" – Bobby
- "In the Name of Jesus" – Cora
- "It's Gonna Be Hallelujah" – Cora
- "God Is the Answer" - Company

== 1999 - 2000 Tour Dates ==
Scheduled shows
Date	City	Venue
April 2, 1999	Washingtion, DC	Warner Theatre
April 4, 1999	Detroit	Music Hall Center for the Performing Arts
April 5, 1999	Detroit	Music Hall Center for the Performing Arts
April 6, 1999	Detroit	Music Hall Center for the Performing Arts
April 7, 1999	Detroit	Music Hall Center for the Performing Arts
April 8, 1999	Detroit	Music Hall Center for the Performing Arts
April 9, 1999	Detroit	Music Hall Center for the Performing Arts
September 28, 1999	Chicago	New Regal Theatre
September 29, 1999	Chicago	New Regal Theatre
October 3, 2000	Dallas	Bruton Theatre
October 4, 2000	Dallas	Bruton Theatre
October 5, 2000	Dallas	Bruton Theatre
January 9, 2001	Miami	Gusman Center For The Performing Arts
January 10, 2001	Miami	Gusman Center For The Performing Arts
January 11, 2001	Miami	Gusman Center For The Performing Arts
January 12, 2001	Miami	Gusman Center For The Performing Arts
January 13, 2001	Miami	Gusman Center For The Performing Arts
January 14, 2001	Miami	Gusman Center For The Performing Arts

== 2002 DVD Recording ==
August 1, 2002	Washington D.C	Lincoln Theatre
August 2, 2002	Washington D.C	Lincoln Theatre
August 3, 2002	Washington D.C	Lincoln Theatre
August 4, 2002	Washington D.C	Lincoln Theatre

== Production Trivia ==
- Jamecia Bennett and Quan Howell originally had parts in the show that were cut early on in the original run.
- Terri Brown-Britton of Trin-i-tee 5:7 would assume the role of Maylee early on into the tour.
- Keisha was a new character instated in the 2002 performance. Her song, the spiritual, "Motherless Child" is a hold-over from Tyler Perry & T.D. Jakes' Woman, Thou Art Loosed!, which Elaine O'Neale also starred as Michelle.
- Carl Pertile previously worked with Tyler Perry on his first play, I Know I've Been Changed. He later originated the role of Mike in Why Did I Get Married?. A show that Donna Stewart would also star in.
- Kisha Grandy, Tamela Mann, and David Mann are original members of Kirk Franklin's group, The Family. In the shows that Kisha appeared, she would sing her rendition of the group's "Silver & Gold". While at the end, Kisha, Tamela, and David would close out the show with a medley of other memorable songs from their time with The Family.
  - On nights that Kisha didn't appear, "Bye Baby" would be sung in its place.
- In the original show, "Let Me Hold You" included a second verse, in which Bobby proposes to Vianne.
- Kelly Price was the original leading lady who was supposed to join the show, but pulled out at the last minute. She was supposed to play the role of "Aunt Lizzie", and sing a few of her own songs. Due to this sudden change, Madea's role was boosted over what was originally a short cameo, and the rest of her lines were split among the rest of the cast.
- During the 2002 performance, there are mentions of characters and events that happen in the previously taped show, Madea's Family Reunion, such as the revelation between Cora's daughters, Lisa and Tina.
- LeJeune Thompson is featured on the play's soundtrack recording subbing in for the vocal parts of Vianne and Cora. She performs the show's original "Bye Baby" in place of Kirk Franklin's Kisha Grandy-led "Silver & Gold."
- Madea was not supposed to be the star of the show. She was only supposed to be on stage for a total of 5 minutes. When Kelly Price didn't show up, Tyler Perry had to say her lines and Madea's lines. At the end of the show, Tyler came out and apologized for promoting Kelly so heavy and her not showing up. The audience gave him a standing ovation and started chanting "We don't care! We don't care!"
- After the 1999 run, Madea became more wilder in the show instead of just a sitting grandma. Often mentioning weed smoking and threatening to shoot her own granddaughter (Maylee). This was toned down for the 2002 DVD version for Tyler Perry's younger audience. But still maintaining a lot of the early material.
- When premiering in Chicago in 1999, Kelly Price originally had the lead role as a character "Lizzy" and was supposed to sing "Friend Of Mine" at the end of the first act.
- Originally, the character "Cora" was supposed to be Mr. Brown's wife and Tamela Mann only had a few lines and sung a couple of songs. After a performer left the show, Tyler Perry changed Cora from Mr. Brown's wife to Madea's daughter and extended her roll.
- The song "Lord I'm Sorry" was originally sung as the play's finale by Maylee. Vianne originally sang "Bye Baby" at the end of the first act...
- The play originally toured from 1999 through 2000 with some performances in 2001.
- The character "Keisha" was never in the touring version of the play. She was added to the tapped performance of the show after Tyler Perry realized how much kids loved watching the plays and wanted to send them a message.
- Before Kiesha was added to the play, Maylee's backstory mentioned an improvised abortion...
- This is Tyler Perry's first Madea play, his second original stage play (after "I Know I've Been Changed"), and the third show to be put on DVD (after "Diary Of A Mad Black Woman" and "Madea's Family Reunion")
- According to the 2000 program book, at the end of act one, Vianne was supposed to sing "Silver and Gold", one of the songs she was best known for singing with Kirk Franklin's Family. With "Bye Baby" being an alternate song for the understudy.
- According to the 2000 program book, "It's Gonna Be Hallelujah" sung by Tamela Mann was sung earlier in scene 4 after Maylee's backstory. On the DVD, she sings a newly added song "In The Name Of Jesus" instead.
- In the 2000 program book, "Lord I'm Sorry" was sung later in the show in Scene 5 by Maylee. On the DVD, Vianne sings it at the end of Act One. Scene 5 in the video includes Cora singing "It's Gonna Be Hallelujah"
- In the final scene of the 2000 touring version of the play, Tamela Mann (Cora) and Kisha Grandy (Vianne) sings a medley of songs from Kirk Franklin's Family, the group they originally were a part of. In the 2002 DVD version of the play, the medley was replaced with "God Is The Answer" with Tyga Graham (Bobby), Donna Stewert (Maylee), and Elaine O'Neal (Keisha) singing along.
- Additional cast members of the early touring version of the play included Kelly Price, Quan Howell, and Jamecia Bennett as other characters before being written out.
- During the 2002 performance, when Donna Stewart first appears as Maylee she is wearing the wrong outfit than what was described earlier by Elaine O'neal as her daughter, Keisha Griffin.

== Film ==
10 years later, a film adaptation titled of the same name was theatrically released on September 11, 2009. The film has a completely different storyline from the play, focusing on an alcoholic club singer (Taraji P. Henson) whose niece and nephews are taken under Madea's wing. It received positive reviews and was commercially successful.

Vianne and Anthony were loosely adapted for A Madea Family Funeral.
