= What's Done in the Dark =

Play written by Tyler Perry

- Original language: English
- Written by: Tyler Perry
- Characters: Mr. Brown, Cora, Brenda, Calvin Jr., Nurse Nancy, Nurse Trudy, Nurse Kerry, Mrs. Bowman, Dr. Bowman, Calvin Sr., Dr. Harris and Mr. & Mrs. Lovett
- Genre: Comedy-Drama
- Setting: Hospital emergency room

Premiere
- Date: September 2006
- Place: Atlanta

What's Done in the Dark (Will Come to the Light) is a 2007 American stage play written, directed and produced by Tyler Perry. The show first opened in September 2006 The play focuses one lady and another Lady. One of whom is a single mother and the other of whom is having an affair with a doctor, and an eccentric hypochondriac patient, Mr. Brown. It stars Tamela Mann as Cora and David Mann as Mr. Brown. The live performance released on DVD on February 12, 2007 was taped in Charlotte at the Ovens Auditorium in May 2007

== Plot ==
Mr. Brown faints right before he and Cora are to fly to Memphis for a televised revival and she rushes him to the emergency room, where a bunch of patients' and doctors' secrets come to light. Brenda, a new admissions clerk at the hospital, is struggling to take care of her son Calvin as a single parent; then Calvin gets shot while trying to hustle money on the streets. Kerry, the head nurse, discovers that the doctor she thought she was going to marry already has a wife and baby-on-the-way...and expects to keep seeing Kerry on the side. Mr. and Mrs. Lovett discover that one gave the other an STD. Trudy, a psychotic nurse, has a crush on Dr. Harris—who figures out that Mr. Brown was faking his illness the whole time.

== Tour Dates ==
Scheduled shows
| Date | City | Venue |
|---|---|---|
| September 12, 2006 | Detroit | Music Hall Center for the Performing Arts |
| September 13, 2006 | Detroit | Music Hall Center for the Performing Arts |
| September 14, 2006 | Detroit | Music Hall Center for the Performing Arts |
| September 15, 2006 | Detroit | Music Hall Center for the Performing Arts |
| September 16, 2006 | Detroit | Music Hall Center for the Performing Arts |
| September 17, 2006 | Detroit | Music Hall Center for the Performing Arts |
| September 21, 2006 | Atlanta | Fabulous Fox Theatre |
| September 22, 2006 | Atlanta | Fabulous Fox Theatre |
| September 23, 2006 | Atlanta | Fabulous Fox Theatre |
| September 24, 2006 | Atlanta | Fabulous Fox Theatre |
| September 26, 2006 | New York | Beacon Theatre |
| September 27, 2006 | New York | Beacon Theatre |
| September 28, 2006 | New York | Beacon Theatre |
| September 29, 2006 | New York | Beacon Theatre |
| September 30, 2006 | New York | Beacon Theatre |
| October 1, 2006 | New York | Beacon Theatre |
| October 3, 2006 | Trenton | Patriots Theater |
| October 4, 2006 | Trenton | Patriots Theater |
| October 5, 2006 | Newark | Newark Symphony Hall |
| October 6, 2006 | Newark | Newark Symphony Hall |
| October 7, 2006 | Newark | Newark Symphony Hall |
| October 8, 2006 | Newark | Newark Symphony Hall |
| October 12, 2006 | Oakland | Paramount Theatre |
| October 13, 2006 | Oakland | Paramount Theatre |
| October 14, 2006 | Oakland | Paramount Theatre |
| October 15, 2006 | Oakland | Paramount Theatre |
| October 17, 2006 | Phoenix | Dodge Theatre |
| October 25, 2006 | Philadelphia | Merriam Theater |
| October 26, 2006 | Philadelphia | Merriam Theater |
| October 27, 2006 | Philadelphia | Merriam Theater |
| October 28, 2006 | Philadelphia | Merriam Theater |
| October 29, 2006 | Philadelphia | Merriam Theater |
| November 1, 2006 | Memphis | Orpheum Theatre |
| November 2, 2006 | Memphis | Orpheum Theatre |
| November 3, 2006 | Memphis | Orpheum Theatre |
| November 4, 2006 | Memphis | Orpheum Theatre |
| November 5, 2006 | Memphis | Orpheum Theatre |
| November 10, 2006 | Chicago | Arie Crown Theater |
| November 14, 2006 | Columbus | Palace Theatre |
| November 16, 2006 | Cleveland | Allen Theatre |
| November 17, 2006 | Cleveland | Allen Theatre |
| November 18, 2006 | Cleveland | Allen Theatre |
| November 19, 2006 | Cleveland | Allen Theatre |
| November 21, 2006 | Philadelphia | Merriam Theater |
| November 22, 2006 | Philadelphia | Merriam Theater |
| November 24, 2006 | Philadelphia | Merriam Theater |
| November 25, 2006 | Philadelphia | Merriam Theater |
| November 26, 2006 | Philadelphia | Merriam Theater |
| January 9, 2007 | Fayetteville | Crown Center of Cumberland County |
| January 10, 2007 | Fayetteville | Crown Center of Cumberland County |
| January 11, 2007 | Greensboro | War Memorial Auditorium |
| January 12, 2007 | Greensboro | War Memorial Auditorium |
| January 13, 2007 | Greensboro | War Memorial Auditorium |
| January 14, 2007 | Greensboro | War Memorial Auditorium |
| January 16, 2007 | Washington, D.C. | Warner Theatre |
| January 17, 2007 | Washington, D.C. | Warner Theatre |
| January 18, 2007 | Washington, D.C. | Warner Theatre |
| January 19, 2007 | Washington, D.C. | Warner Theatre |
| January 20, 2007 | Washington, D.C. | Warner Theatre |
| January 21, 2007 | Washington, D.C. | Warner Theatre |
| January 23, 2007 | Washington, D.C. | Warner Theatre |
| January 24, 2007 | Washington, D.C. | Warner Theatre |
| January 25, 2007 | Washington, D.C. | Warner Theatre |
| January 26, 2007 | Washington, D.C. | Warner Theatre |
| January 27, 2007 | Washington, D.C. | Warner Theatre |
| January 28, 2007 | Washington, D.C. | Warner Theatre |
| January 30, 2007 | Grand Rapids | DeVos Performance Hall |
| January 31, 2007 | Grand Rapids | DeVos Performance Hall |
| February 1, 2007 | Indianapolis | Murat Centre |
| February 2, 2007 | Indianapolis | Murat Centre |
| February 3, 2007 | Indianapolis | Murat Centre |
| February 4, 2007 | Indianapolis | Murat Centre |
| February 13, 2007 | Charleston | North Charleston Performing Arts Center |
| February 14, 2007 | Charleston | North Charleston Performing Arts Center |
| February 15, 2007 | Columbia | Township Auditorium |
| February 16, 2007 | Columbia | Township Auditorium |
| February 17, 2007 | Columbia | Township Auditorium |
| February 18, 2007 | Columbia | Township Auditorium |
| February 20, 2007 | Syracuse | Landmark Theatre |
| February 21, 2007 | Syracuse | Landmark Theatre |
| February 23, 2007 | Hartford | Bushnell Center for the Performing Arts |
| February 24, 2007 | Hartford | Bushnell Center for the Performing Arts |
| February 25, 2007 | Hartford | Bushnell Center for the Performing Arts |
| February 27, 2007 | Albany | Albany Civic Center |
| March 1, 2007 | Nashville | Tennessee Performing Arts Center |
| March 2, 2007 | Nashville | Tennessee Performing Arts Center |
| March 3, 2007 | Nashville | Tennessee Performing Arts Center |
| March 4, 2007 | Nashville | Tennessee Performing Arts Center |
| March 7, 2007 | South Bend | Morris Performing Arts Center |
| March 8, 2007 | Peoria | Peoria Civic Center |
| March 9, 2007 | Milwaukee | Milwaukee Theatre |
| March 10, 2007 | Milwaukee | Milwaukee Theatre |
| March 11, 2007 | Milwaukee | Milwaukee Theatre |
| March 16, 2007 | Minneapolis | Orpheum Theatre |
| March 17, 2007 | Minneapolis | Orpheum Theatre |
| March 18, 2007 | Minneapolis | Orpheum Theatre |
| March 21, 2007 | Austin | Frank Erwin Center |
| March 22, 2007 | Dallas | Music Hall at Fair Park |
| March 23, 2007 | Dallas | Music Hall at Fair Park |
| March 24, 2007 | Dallas | Music Hall at Fair Park |
| March 25, 2007 | Dallas | Music Hall at Fair Park |
| April 10, 2007 | Tampa | USF Sun Dome |
| April 11, 2007 | Tampa | USF Sun Dome |
| April 13, 2007 | Orlando | Orange County Convention Center |
| April 14, 2007 | Orlando | Orange County Convention Center |
| April 15, 2007 | Orlando | Orange County Convention Center |
| April 17, 2007 | Miami | James L. Knight Center |
| April 18, 2007 | Miami | James L. Knight Center |
| April 19, 2007 | Miami | James L. Knight Center |
| April 20, 2007 | Miami | James L. Knight Center |
| April 21, 2007 | Miami | James L. Knight Center |
| April 22, 2007 | Miami | James L. Knight Center |
| April 24, 2007 | Richmond | Landmark Theater |
| April 25, 2007 | Richmond | Landmark Theater |
| April 26, 2007 | Richmond | Landmark Theater |
| April 27, 2007 | Richmond | Landmark Theater |
| April 28, 2007 | Hampton | Hampton Coliseum |
| April 29, 2007 | Hampton | Hampton Coliseum |
| May 1, 2007 | Florence | Florence Civic Center |
| May 2, 2007 | Florence | Florence Civic Center |
| May 3, 2007 | Charlotte | Ovens Auditorium |
| May 4, 2007 | Charlotte | Ovens Auditorium |
| May 5, 2007 | Charlotte | Ovens Auditorium |
| May 6, 2007 | Charlotte | Ovens Auditorium |
| May 8, 2007 | Mobile | Mobile Civic Center Arena |
| May 9, 2007 | Mobile | Mobile Civic Center Arena |
| May 11, 2007 | Jacksonville | Times-Union Center for the Performing Arts |
| May 12, 2007 | Jacksonville | Times-Union Center for the Performing Arts |
| May 13, 2007 | Jacksonville | Times-Union Center for the Performing Arts |
| September 4, 2007 | Aiken | USC Aiken Convocation Center |
| September 6, 2007 | Atlanta | Fabulous Fox Theatre |
| September 7, 2007 | Atlanta | Fabulous Fox Theatre |
| September 8, 2007 | Atlanta | Fabulous Fox Theatre |
| September 9, 2007 | Atlanta | Fabulous Fox Theatre |
| September 11, 2007 | Albany | Palace Theatre |
| September 12, 2007 | Albany | Palace Theatre |
| September 13, 2007 | Rochester | Auditorium Theatre |
| September 14, 2007 | Rochester | Auditorium Theatre |
| September 15, 2007 | Buffalo | Shea's Performing Arts Center |
| September 16, 2007 | Buffalo | Shea's Performing Arts Center |
| September 18, 2007 | Louisville | Kentucky Center |
| September 19, 2007 | Louisville | Kentucky Center |
| September 20, 2007 | Evansville | The Centre |
| September 21, 2007 | St. Louis | Fox Theatre |
| September 22, 2007 | St. Louis | Fox Theatre |
| September 23, 2007 | St. Louis | Fox Theatre |
| September 28, 2007 | Des Moines | Des Moines Civic Center |
| September 29, 2007 | Kansas City | Kansas City Music Hall |
| September 30, 2007 | Kansas City | Kansas City Music Hall |
| October 2, 2007 | Montgomery | Joe L. Reed Acadome |
| October 3, 2007 | Montgomery | Joe L. Reed Acadome |
| October 5, 2007 | Jackson | Thalia Mara Hall |
| October 6, 2007 | Jackson | Thalia Mara Hall |
| October 7, 2007 | Biloxi | Mississippi Coast Coliseum |
| October 12, 2007 | Detroit | Fox Theatre |
| October 13, 2007 | Detroit | Fox Theatre |
| October 14, 2007 | Detroit | Fox Theatre |
| October 16, 2007 | Dayton | Schuster Center |
| October 17, 2007 | Dayton | Schuster Center |
| October 19, 2007 | Cincinnati | Aronoff Center |
| October 20, 2007 | Cincinnati | Aronoff Center |
| October 21, 2007 | Cincinnati | Aronoff Center |
| October 23, 2007 | Raleigh | RBC Center |
| October 25, 2007 | New Orleans | New Orleans Convention Center |
| October 26, 2007 | New Orleans | New Orleans Convention Center |
| October 27, 2007 | New Orleans | New Orleans Convention Center |
| October 28, 2007 | New Orleans | New Orleans Convention Center |
| October 30, 2007 | Akron | E.J. Thomas Hall |
| October 31, 2007 | Flint | Perani Arena and Event Center |
| November 1, 2007 | Chicago | Arie Crown Theater |
| November 2, 2007 | Chicago | Arie Crown Theater |
| November 3, 2007 | Chicago | Arie Crown Theater |
| November 4, 2007 | Chicago | Arie Crown Theater |
| November 6, 2007 | Macon | Macon City Auditorium |
| November 7, 2007 | Macon | Macon City Auditorium |
| November 10, 2007 | Greenville | Bi-Lo Center |
| November 16, 2007 | Memphis | Orpheum Theatre |
| November 17, 2007 | Memphis | Orpheum Theatre |
| November 18, 2007 | Memphis | Orpheum Theatre |
| November 20, 2007 | Huntsville | Von Braun Center Concert Hall |
| November 21, 2007 | Huntsville | Von Braun Center Concert Hall |
| November 22, 2007 | Birmingham | BJCC Concert Hall |
| November 23, 2007 | Birmingham | BJCC Concert Hall |
| November 24, 2007 | Birmingham | BJCC Concert Hall |
| November 25, 2007 | Birmingham | BJCC Concert Hall |

== Cast ==
- David Mann as Mr. Brown
- Tamela Mann as Cora
- Chandra Currelley-Young as Brenda
- Ahmad Jamal McGhee as Calvin Rhodes Jr.
- Cassi Davis as Nurse Nancy Williams
  - Latrice Pace as Nurse Nancy Williams (FILMED VERSION)
- D'Atra Hicks as Nurse Trudy
- Julie Dickens as Nurse Kerry Johnson
  - Shonda Vincent as Nurse Kerry Johnson (FILMED VERSION)
- Nina Nicole as Mrs. Bowman

Chantell D. Christopher as Mrs. Bowman

- Lavan Davis as Security Guard

‘’’(FILMED VERSION)’’’

- Terrell Carter as Dr. Paul Bowman
- Dino Hanson as Calvin Rhodes Sr.
- Allen Payne as Dr. Harris
  - Christian Keyes as Dr. Harris (FILMED VERSION)
- Ryan Gentles as Nick Lovett
- Matisha Baldwin as Angela Lovett
  - Demetria Mckinney as Angela Lovett
  - Syr Law

== The Band ==
- Ronnie Garrett - Musical director / Bass Guitar
- Anthony Lockett - Guitar
- Marcus Williams - Drums
- Mike Logan - Keyboards
- Michael Burton - Saxophone / Keyboards

== Musical numbers ==
All songs written and/or produced by Tyler Perry and Elvin D. Ross.

1. "What's Done in the Dark" - Nancy
2. "You Ain't Seen Nothing Yet" - Paul
3. "Struggle No More" - Calvin Jr.
4. "Jehovah Jireh" - Brenda
5. "Church Medley" -
  1. "I Gotta Go Through" - Brenda
  2. "I Know It Was the Blood" - Nancy
  3. "I'm on the Battlefield" - Mr. Brown
  4. "Trouble in My Way" - Cora
  5. "Jesus Will Fix It" - Cora
6. "Step Aside" - Cora
7. "Remember Your Vows" - Nancy
8. "If Only You Knew" - Trudy

== Trivia ==
- Tamela Mann, David Mann, Chandra Currelley, D'Atra Hicks, Cassi Davis, Terrell Carter, Chantell D. Christopher and Demetria McKinney have starred in several Tyler Perry productions, films, and television series.
- Christian Keyes and Ryan Gentles notably starred as Sonny and Nate, respectively, in Madea Goes to Jail.
- Latrice Pace was a part of the most well-known cast of I Know I've Been Changed.
- Ahmad Jamal McGhee was a part of the cast of Madea's Class Reunion.
- On the DVD recording and the latter majority of the tour, the roles of Nurse Nancy, Dr. Harris, and Nurse Kerry were portrayed by Latrice Pace, Christian Keyes, and Shonda Vincent, respectively. Cassi Davis, Allen Payne, and Demetria McKinney all left the show in 2006 for House of Payne.
- Brenda and Calvin's storyline was later adapted as the main focus of the film version of Meet the Browns, starring Angela Bassett, and Lance Gross as Michael Rhodes Jr. Demetria Mckinney also portrayed Angela Lovett
