= I Know I've Been Changed =

1998 play by Tyler Perry

- Written by: Tyler Perry
- Characters: Joe, Mary, Fanny, Ellen, Sam, Mitch, Sister Lewis, Millie, and Lequita

Premiere
- Original run: 1998-2000
- Official website

I Know I've Been Changed was the first successful play from playwright Tyler Perry. The play focuses on issues including child abuse and rape and how they can be overcome by a strong belief in God.

Soul musician Ryan Shaw got his start performing in this play in 1998. The play received its first staging in Atlanta in 1992. The play toured from 1998 to 2000.

Grammy award winning vocalist Ann Nesby of the musical and instrumental group Sounds of Blackness played a supporting role in this play/production.

"I Know I've Been Changed" has been called one of the most successful shows of this genre, selling out repeatedly during its 1998-99 tour in major cities like D.C., New York, Chicago, Philadelphia and Miami, just to name a few. After being sold out for three weeks in Dallas, an exhausted Perry decided to add a Monday night show.

== Plot ==
This hard-hitting play used comedy and drama to tell a story of two adult survivors of child abuse who became the people that their abusive mother said they would be. It is also the story of how they overcame, by the power of God, with a shocking twist at the end. Mary, the lead character, married and had two children before she had the opportunity to become an adult herself. Emotionally and spiritually irresponsible, she sought the succor of drugs to alleviate the pressure of rearing her children. This drug abuse manifests itself in verbal, emotional and physical abuse toward her children. She is unable to see the beauty of her own children, and, while addicted to drugs, is unable to alter the destructive path she has embarked upon. Compounding an already dysfunctional family situation, the husband is abusive to his wife and children as well, molesting his older son, which results in a dramatic plot twist later in the play. Fanny, is a mother divorcing her husband after becoming a famous singer. In a bold move to pursue her dreams she had to leave her daughter Ellen, to be raised by her husband, Joe.

== 1998/1999 Cast ==
- Tyler Perry as Joe
- Sheila Stroud as Mary
  - Shirley Marie Graham (1998)
- Ann Nesby as Fanny
- LaShun Pace as Sister Lewis (Chandra Currelly Subs The Voice Of Sister Lewis In The Soundtrack)
- Jamecia Bennett as Ellen
  - Saycon Sengbloh (1998)
- Latrice Pace as Millie
  - Bernadette Grant
  - Chandra Currelly (Subs Ms.Millie In The Soundtrack)
- Ryan Shaw as Sam
  - Darnell Harris (1998)
- Carl Pertile as Mitch
- Jasmine Ross as Lequita
  - Sylvia Cannon
- Quan Howell as Reverend
- Chandra Currelly as Emma

== Shows ==
Scheduled shows
| Date | City | Venue |
|---|---|---|
| March 12, 1998 | Atlanta | The Tabernacle |
| March 13, 1998 | Atlanta | The Tabernacle |
| March 14, 1998 | Atlanta | The Tabernacle |
| March 15, 1998 | Atlanta | The Tabernacle |
| April 27, 1998 | Rochester | Rochester Auditorium Theatre |
| April 28, 1998 | Rochester | Rochester Auditorium Theatre |
| April 29, 1998 | Buffalo | Kleinhans Music Hall |
| April 30, 1998 | Pittsburgh | Benedum Center |
| May 6, 1998 | Columbus | Palace Theatre |
| May 12, 1998 | Baltimore | Lyric Performing Arts Center |
| May 13, 1998 | Baltimore | Lyric Performing Arts Center |
| May 14, 1998 | Baltimore | Lyric Performing Arts Center |
| May 15, 1998 | Baltimore | Lyric Performing Arts Center |
| May 16, 1998 | Baltimore | Lyric Performing Arts Center |
| May 17, 1998 | Baltimore | Lyric Performing Arts Center |
| June 21, 1998 | Manhattan | Beacon Theatre |
| October 2, 1998 | Chicago | Avalon Regal Theater |
| October 3, 1998 | Chicago | Avalon Regal Theater |
| October 4, 1998 | Chicago | Avalon Regal Theater |
| October 11, 1998 | Oakland | Paramount Theatre |
| November 10, 1998 | Dorchester | Strand Theatre |
| January 12, 1999 | Miami | Olympia Theater |
| January 13, 1999 | Miami | Olympia Theater |
| January 14, 1999 | Miami | Olympia Theater |
| January 15, 1999 | Miami | Olympia Theater |
| January 16, 1999 | Miami | Olympia Theater |
| January 17, 1999 | Miami | Olympia Theater |
| January 26, 1999 | Dallas | Dallas Convention Center Theater |
| January 27, 1999 | Dallas | Dallas Convention Center Theater |
| January 28, 1999 | Dallas | Dallas Convention Center Theater |
| January 29, 1999 | Dallas | Dallas Convention Center Theater |
| January 30, 1999 | Dallas | Dallas Convention Center Theater |
| January 31, 1999 | Dallas | Dallas Convention Center Theater |
| February 5, 1999 | Memphis | Orpheum Theatre |
| February 6, 1999 | Memphis | Orpheum Theatre |
| February 7, 1999 | Memphis | Orpheum Theatre |
| February 25, 1999 | Indianapolis | Old National Centre |
| March 26, 1999 | Memphis | Orpheum Theatre |
| March 27, 1999 | Memphis | Orpheum Theatre |
| March 28, 1999 | Memphis | Orpheum Theatre |
| April 22, 1999 | Kansas City | Kansas City Music Hall |
| April 23, 1999 | Kansas City | Kansas City Music Hall |
| April 24, 1999 | Kansas City | Kansas City Music Hall |
| April 25, 1999 | Kansas City | Kansas City Music Hall |
| September 28, 1999 | Detroit | Music Hall Center for the Performing Arts |
| September 29, 1999 | Detroit | Music Hall Center for the Performing Arts |
| September 30, 1999 | Detroit | Music Hall Center for the Performing Arts |
| October 1, 1999 | Detroit | Music Hall Center for the Performing Arts |
| October 2, 1999 | Detroit | Music Hall Center for the Performing Arts |
| October 3, 1999 | Detroit | Music Hall Center for the Performing Arts |
| November 18, 1999 | St. Louis | Fox Theatre |
| November 19, 1999 | St. Louis | Fox Theatre |
| November 20, 1999 | St. Louis | Fox Theatre |
| November 21, 1999 | St. Louis | Fox Theatre |

| Date | City | Venue |
|---|---|---|
| March 30, 1999 | Washington, D.C. | Warner Theatre |
| March 31, 1999 | Washington, D.C. | Warner Theatre |
| April 1, 1999 | Washington, D.C. | Warner Theatre |
| April 2, 1999 | Washington, D.C. | Warner Theatre |
| April 3, 1999 | Washington, D.C. | Warner Theatre |
| April 4, 1999 | Washington, D.C. | Warner Theatre |
| April 13, 1999 | Akron | Akron Civic Theatre |
| April 14, 1999 | Akron | Akron Civic Theatre |
| April 15, 1999 | Cincinnati | Taft Theatre |
| April 16, 1999 | Cincinnati | Taft Theatre |
| April 17, 1999 | Cincinnati | Taft Theatre |
| April 18, 1999 | Cincinnati | Taft Theatre |
| April 20, 1999 | Tulsa | Brady Theatre |
| April 21, 1999 | Tulsa | Brady Theatre |
| April 22, 1999 | Kansas City | Kansas City Convention & Entertainment Center |
| April 23, 1999 | Kansas City | Kansas City Convention & Entertainment Center |
| April 24, 1999 | Kansas City | Kansas City Convention & Entertainment Center |
| April 25, 1999 | Kansas City | Kansas City Convention & Entertainment Center |
| April 27, 1999 | New York City | Beacon Theatre |
| April 28, 1999 | New York City | Beacon Theatre |
| April 29, 1999 | New York City | Beacon Theatre |
| April 30, 1999 | New York City | Beacon Theatre |
| May 1, 1999 | New York City | Beacon Theatre |
| May 2, 1999 | New York City | Beacon Theatre |
| May 4, 1999 | New York City | Beacon Theatre |
| May 5, 1999 | New York City | Beacon Theatre |
| May 6, 1999 | New York City | Beacon Theatre |
| May 7, 1999 | New York City | Beacon Theatre |
| May 8, 1999 | New York City | Beacon Theatre |
| May 9, 1999 | New York City | Beacon Theatre |
| May 11, 1999 | Atlanta | Atlanta Civic Center |
| May 12, 1999 | Atlanta | Atlanta Civic Center |
| May 13, 1999 | Atlanta | Atlanta Civic Center |
| May 14, 1999 | Atlanta | Atlanta Civic Center |
| May 15, 1999 | Atlanta | Atlanta Civic Center |
| May 16, 1999 | Atlanta | Atlanta Civic Center |
| May 18, 1999 | Houston | Wortham Theater Center |
| May 19, 1999 | Houston | Wortham Theater Center |
| May 20, 1999 | Houston | Wortham Theater Center |
| May 21, 1999 | Houston | Wortham Theater Center |
| May 22, 1999 | Houston | Wortham Theater Center |
| May 23, 1999 | Houston | Wortham Theater Center |
| May 25, 1999 | Houston | Wortham Theater Center |
| May 26, 1999 | Houston | Wortham Theater Center |
| May 27, 1999 | Houston | Wortham Theater Center |
| May 28, 1999 | Houston | Wortham Theater Center |
| May 29, 1999 | Houston | Wortham Theater Center |
| May 30, 1999 | Houston | Wortham Theater Center |

== The Band ==
- Elvin Ross - Musical Director/Keyboards
- John Forbes - Keyboards
- Mike Frazier - Bass
- Brien Andrews - Drums

== Musical Numbers ==
All songs written and/or arranged by Tyler Perry and Elvin D. Ross.

- "Overture" - Band
- "I Know I've Been Changed" - Mary
- "Just Because God Said It" or "Don't Be Discouraged" - Sister Lewis
- "More Than Just a Sin" - Ellen
- "I Should Have Been There" - Mary
- "If I Knew What To Do" - Mitch
- "I'm Still Wearing Your Name" - Fanny
- "Gotta Move Blues" - Joe
- "Old Time Mix" - Millie, Mary, Ellen
- "She's Gonna Live" - Ellen and Johnny
- "He Will Take Away All Your Pain / I Know I've Been Changed" (Reprise) - Company

== Trivia ==
- This is the debut play of Tyler Perry.
- In this play, Tyler Perry portrays Joe, a character still being portrayed by Perry in his movies (as the brother of fan-favorite character, Madea).
- While existing as one of Perry's first plays, it is one of the very least few that is not available on DVD.
  - The show was later supposed to be taped in 2002, and then in 2003. The plans weren't followed through for unknown reasons.
- "More Than Just A Sin" would later be included as part of the filmed version of "Why Did I Get Married? in 2005.
- This arrangement of the "Old Time Mix" would later be reused in 2002's "Madea's Family Reunion.
- Chandra Currelly, Ms. Millie in the show, subs in for the voice of Sister Lewis on the play's soundtrack recording, performing the show original "Don't Be Discouraged" in place of LaShun's "Just Because God Said It."
