= Madea's Big Happy Family =

Play written by Tyler Perry

- Written by: Tyler Perry
- Characters: Madea, Aunt Bam, Shirley, Joyce, Monroe, Byron, Donnie, Kimberly, Harold, Tammy, Rose, Jason, Karen, Dr. Wallace
- Original language: English
- Subject: Family, Death
- Genre: Comedy-Drama

Premiere
- Date premiered: January 4, 2010
- Place premiered: El Paso

Madea's Big Happy Family is a 2010 American stage play created, produced, written, and directed by Tyler Perry. It stars Tyler Perry as Mabel "Madea" Simmons and Cassi Davis as Aunt Bam. The play also marks the debut appearance of Aunt Bam played by Davis. Perry began writing the show after the death of his mother Willie Maxine Perry on December 8, 2009. The main character of Shirley is based on her. The live performance released on DVD on November 23, 2010 was recorded live in Atlanta at the Cobb Energy Performing Arts Centre in July 2010. The play was performed 125 times in 126 days over the course of its 2010 tour.

== Plot ==
Shirley (Chandra Currelley-Young), accompanied by Aunt Bam (Cassi Davis), visits Dr. Frank Wallace (Omarr Dixon). Dr. Wallace tells Shirley that her cancer is active and she might have 4–6 weeks left. Later, Aunt Bam tells Shirley that she invited Madea to come over and help her when she tells her children the news. The scene later switches to the house where Joyce (Cheryl Pepsii Riley) shows up and informs Shirley that she called everybody, later Aunt Bam complains about the fact that she still doesn't have a man. Soon enough, Madea (Tyler Perry) arrives, ready to help Shirley.

When Tammy (Crissy Collins) shows up, Madea informs her that she's very angry with her and her husband Harold (Danny Clay): she gave them $275 to fix her car and it didn't start. Byron (Jeffery Lewis) and his girlfriend Rose (Chontelle Moore) arrive, and Aunt Bam tells Rose she wants her $20, which Rose borrowed about a year ago. Rose says it's petty to ask for such a small amount of money back, then reveals that she dropped $900 on eyeshadow and shoes. Madea convinces Aunt Bam to chase after Rose. Kimberly (Támar Davis) arrives demanding to know why her sisters summoned her to the house, but they don't know themselves. When Donnie (Zuri Craig) comes, he tries to kiss Aunt Bam and Madea, who warns him that she got H1N1 from his last kiss. When Madea quizzes him, he says he's 17 and in the 6th grade, to which she responds that at least he's in school and his children will know he's right down the hall from their classrooms. Harold arrives and Madea repeats what she told Tammy, and now that they're both here she tells them both that if her car isn't fixed when she's ready to leave, they'll have to run like hell. Kimberly's husband, Jason (Rico Ball) rushes in to announce that Uncle Monroe (Palmer Williams Jr.) has arrived; everyone hides their stuff because he's a crack cocaine-addicted kleptomaniac. Uncle Monroe has barely stepped inside when he thinks he smells drugs in the kitchen, which makes him hurry.

Karen (Brandi Milton) stalks in demanding to see Byron, which sparks Rose's jealousy. Karen threatens Byron that if he doesn't pay her some child support, 'the popo's gon' be knockin' at yo' do'!', backed up by Aunt Bam. Madea orders Karen to leave, they're having a family moment. Byron, Karen (and her baby), and Rose leave, Kimberly demands to know why she was called, and Jason chides her for her attitude, which angers her more and she storms out. When Harold points out how Kimberly's behavior is similar to Tammy's, Tammy tells him to shut up and he turns away in shame. Uncle Monroe calls a Man Meeting in the kitchen. He talks Harold into standing up for himself, but when Tammy comes in, he pretends the men are having a Bible study.

Madea notices Byron sagging and tells him to pull up his pants. Shirley looks upset and Donnie and Byron sing her a gospel song. Meanwhile, Donnie finds out from Aunt Bam that Kimberly is his real mother. Madea leaves the house and tries to start her car, but unfortunately for Tammy and Harold, her car wouldn't start. So she gets her gun and starts chasing after Harold and Tammy.

The next day, Shirley's cancer starts taking effect and she assures Joyce that she is all right and that she knows she's close to Heaven. Joyce thanks her for giving her the life they both wanted by Shirley giving her Jesus (You Gave Me Jesus) since Aunt Bam spills that Shirley is sick. That night, Joyce gets a new makeover for the date with Frank that Aunt Bam set up. Then Frank tells her that her mother is in the hospital. Then Shirley tells all her children that she wants them to do the right thing, although she will be gone forever. Shirley dies, and her spirit goes up to Heaven ("Heaven Waits for Me") and this makes everyone sad (as they strongly cry for her loss) and scared of what will happen in their futures without her (calling out to the Lord).

When everyone comes home from the funeral, they gather in the living room. Madea gives everyone advice on what they should do. Karen stops by to express her condolences to Byron, but soon they began to argue. Frustrated, Madea tells Karen to stop worrying about Byron and Rose, stop using her baby to make Byron's life miserable, and keep moving forward. Rose tells Byron it's time to go, but Madea snatches Byron's shirt, re-seating him. When Rose tells Madea she should let her "man" grow up and be a man, Madea uses Uncle Monroe's "Yah, trick!"-choke-move on her. She follows up by lecturing them that the elderly should be treated with respect and dignity, after all, they marched for their freedom. She finally lets them leave and moves on to Harold and Tammy: Tammy shouldn't talk to Harold so harshly, but Harold needs to toughen up. Then she talks to Joyce about how God works through people's prayers. Lastly, Madea reveals that Kimberly was raped by an uncle on her father's side at 12 years old. She then tells her that she has love and needs get past the pain and show it more. Kimberly goes upstairs with Jason and sincerely apologizes for all she's done ("You Are My Man").

Madea goes "off-script" to talk about things that are happening in "the world today." Later, Madea gathers everyone and they all join in singing old songs. Finally, upstairs, Harold asks Tammy to sit down and when she doesn't comply, he yells at her. Harold then resolves the issue between their relationship with a song ("If Only For One Night").

== Tour dates ==
Winter / Spring 2010
Date	City	Venue
January 4, 2010	El Paso	UTEP Don Haskins Center
January 5, 2010	Phoenix	Dodge Theatre
January 6, 2010	San Diego	San Diego Sports Arena
January 9, 2010	Seattle	KeyArena
January 10, 2010	Portland	Veterans Memorial Coliseum
January 12, 2010	Fresno	Selland Arena
January 13, 2010	Sacramento	ARCO Arena
January 14, 2010	Oakland	Paramount Theatre
January 15, 2010	Oakland	Paramount Theatre
January 16, 2010	Oakland	Paramount Theatre
January 19, 2010	Hollywood	Kodak Theatre
January 20, 2010	Hollywood	Kodak Theatre
January 21, 2010	Hollywood	Kodak Theatre
January 22, 2010	Hollywood	Kodak Theatre
January 23, 2010	Hollywood	Kodak Theatre
January 24, 2010	Hollywood	Kodak Theatre
January 27, 2010	New York	The Theater at Madison Square Garden
January 28, 2010	New York	The Theater at Madison Square Garden
January 29, 2010	New York	The Theater at Madison Square Garden
January 30, 2010	New York	The Theater at Madison Square Garden
January 31, 2010	New York	The Theater at Madison Square Garden
February 2, 2010	Florence	Florence Civic Center
February 3, 2010	Raleigh	RBC Center
February 4, 2010	Raleigh	RBC Center
February 5, 2010	Raleigh	RBC Center
February 6, 2010	Fayetteville	Crown Coliseum
February 7, 2010	Charlotte	Bojangles Coliseum
February 9, 2010	Macon	Macon Centreplex
February 10, 2010	Charleston	North Charleston Coliseum
February 11, 2010	Charleston	North Charleston Coliseum
February 12, 2010	Columbia	Colonial Life Arena
February 13, 2010	Columbia	Colonial Life Arena
February 14, 2010	Columbus	Columbus Civic Center
February 16, 2010	Jacksonville	Jacksonville Veterans Memorial Arena
February 17, 2010	Jacksonville	Jacksonville Veterans Memorial Arena
February 18, 2010	Chattanooga	Soldiers and Sailors Memorial Auditorium
February 19, 2010	Winston-Salem	Lawrence Joel Veterans Memorial Coliseum
February 20, 2010	Winston-Salem	Lawrence Joel Veterans Memorial Coliseum
February 21, 2010	Richmond	Richmond Coliseum
February 23, 2010	Albany	Albany Civic Center
February 24, 2010	Nashville	Nashville Municipal Auditorium
February 25, 2010	Nashville	Nashville Municipal Auditorium
February 27, 2010	Memphis	Orpheum Theatre
February 28, 2010	Memphis	Orpheum Theatre
March 2, 2010	Chicago	Arie Crown Theater
March 3, 2010	Chicago	Arie Crown Theater
March 4, 2010	Chicago	Arie Crown Theater
March 5, 2010	Chicago	Arie Crown Theater
March 6, 2010	Chicago	Arie Crown Theater
March 9, 2010	Minneapolis	Target Center
March 10, 2010	Omaha	Qwest Center
March 11, 2010	Wichita	Century II Performing Arts & Convention Center
March 12, 2010	Grand Prairie	Nokia Theatre
March 13, 2010	Grand Prairie	Nokia Theatre
March 14, 2010	Grand Prairie	Nokia Theatre
March 16, 2010	Milwaukee	U.S. Cellular Arena
March 18, 2010	Bridgeport	Arena at Harbor Yard
March 19, 2010	Hartford	Bushnell Center for the Performing Arts
March 20, 2010	Hartford	Bushnell Center for the Performing Arts
March 21, 2010	Hartford	Bushnell Center for the Performing Arts
March 24, 2010	Augusta	James Brown Arena
March 25, 2010	Greenville	Bi-Lo Center
March 26, 2010	Greenville	Bi-Lo Center
March 27, 2010	Birmingham	BJCC Arena
March 28, 2010	Mobile	Mobile Civic Center
April 6, 2010	Dayton	Ervin J. Nutter Center
April 7, 2010	Cincinnati	
April 8, 2010	Louisville	Freedom Hall
April 9, 2010	Chicago	Arie Crown Theater
April 10, 2010	Chicago	Arie Crown Theater
April 11, 2010	Chicago	Arie Crown Theater
April 13, 2010	Savannah	Savannah Civic Center
April 14, 2010	Savannah	Savannah Civic Center
April 15, 2010	Atlanta	The Fabulous Fox Theatre
April 16, 2010	Atlanta	The Fabulous Fox Theatre
April 17, 2010	Atlanta	The Fabulous Fox Theatre
April 18, 2010	Atlanta	The Fabulous Fox Theatre
April 20, 2010	Norfolk	Constant Convention Center
April 21, 2010	Norfolk	Constant Convention Center
April 23, 2010	St. Louis	Chaifetz Arena
April 24, 2010	St. Louis	Chaifetz Arena
April 25, 2010	Kansas City	Sprint Center
April 27, 2010	Buffalo	HSBC Arena
April 29, 2010	Philadelphia	Liacouras Center
April 30, 2010	Philadelphia	Liacouras Center
May 1, 2010	Philadelphia	Liacouras Center
May 2, 2010	Philadelphia	Liacouras Center
May 4, 2010	Columbus	Nationwide Arena
May 5, 2010	Toledo	Lucas County Arena
May 6, 2010	Detroit	Fox Theatre
May 7, 2010	Detroit	Fox Theatre
May 8, 2010	Detroit	Fox Theatre
May 9, 2010	Detroit	Fox Theatre

DVD Taping - Summer 2010
Date	City	Venue
July 16, 2010	Atlanta	Cobb Energy Performing Arts Center
July 17, 2010	Atlanta	Cobb Energy Performing Arts Center

Fall 2010
Date	City	Venue
September 15, 2010	New Orleans	New Orleans Arena
September 16, 2010	New Orleans	New Orleans Arena
September 17, 2010	New Orleans	New Orleans Arena
September 18, 2010	Houston	Toyota Center
September 19, 2010	Houston	Toyota Center
September 21, 2010	Roanoke	Berglund Center
September 23, 2010	Pittsburgh	Petersen Events Center
September 24, 2010	Washington, D.C.	Verizon Center
September 25, 2010	Washington, D.C.	Verizon Center
September 26, 2010	Washington, D.C.	Verizon Center
September 28, 2010	Pensacola	Pensacola Civic Center
September 29, 2010	Tallahassee	Tallahassee-Leon County Civic Center
September 30, 2010	Tampa	USF Dome
October 1, 2010	Miami	American Airlines Arena
October 2, 2010	Miami	American Airlines Arena
October 3, 2010	Miami	American Airlines Arena
October 5, 2010	Syracuse	War Memorial at Oncenter
October 6, 2010	Rochester	Blue Cross Arena
October 7, 2010	Bridgeport	Arena at Harbor Yard
October 8, 2010	Baltimore	1st Mariner Arena
October 9, 2010	Baltimore	1st Mariner Arena
October 10, 2010	Baltimore	1st Mariner Arena
October 12, 2010	Newark	Prudential Center
October 13, 2010	Newark	Prudential Center
October 14, 2010	Uniondale	Nassau Coliseum
October 15, 2010	New York	The Theater at Madison Square Garden
October 16, 2010	New York	The Theater at Madison Square Garden
October 17, 2010	New York	The Theater at Madison Square Garden

Cancellations and rescheduled shows

Date	City	Venue
October 19, 2010	Orlando	Amway Center
October 20, 2010	Augusta	James Brown Arena
October 21, 2010	Greensboro	Greensboro Coliseum Complex
October 22, 2010	Richmond	Richmond Coliseum
October 23, 2010	Richmond	Richmond Coliseum
October 24, 2010	Norfolk	Constant Convocation Center
October 26, 2010	Saginaw	Dow Event Center
October 27, 2010	Dayton	Nutter Center
October 28, 2010	Grand Rapids	Van Andel Arena
October 29, 2010	Peoria
Peoria Civic Center	October 30, 2010	Milwaukee	U.S. Cellular Arena
October 31, 2010	Indianapolis	Conseco Bridgehouse
November 2, 2010	Bossier City	CenturyTel Center
November 3, 2010	Austin	Frank Erwin Center
November 4, 2010	Baton Rouge	Baton Rouge River Center
November 6, 2010	Mobile	Mobile Civic Center
November 7, 2010	Jackson	Mississippi Coliseum
November 9, 2010	Huntsville	Von Braun Center
November 10, 2010	North Little Rock	Verizon Arena
November 11, 2010	North Little Rock	Verizon Arena
November 13, 2010	Southaven	DeSoto Civic Center
November 14, 2010	Birmingham	BJJC Arena
November 16, 2010	Moline	iWireless Center
November 17, 2010	Fort Wayne	Allen County War Memorial Coliseum
November 18, 2010	Louisville	KFC Yum! Center
November 20, 2010	Detroit	Joe Louis Arena
November 21, 2010	Cleveland	Quicken Loans Arena
November 24, 2010	Tulsa	BOK Center
November 26, 2010	Oklahoma City	Ford Center
November 27, 2010	Grand Prairie	Verizon Theatre
November 28, 2010	Grand Prairie	Verizon Theatre

== Cast ==
- Tyler Perry as Madea
- Cassi Davis as Aunt Bam
- Chandra Currelley-Young as Shirley
- Cheryl Pepsii Riley as Joyce
- Támar Davis as Kimberly
- Jeffery Lewis as Byron
- Zuri Craig as Donnie
- Crissy Collins as Tammy
- Danny Clay as Harold Jones
- Rico Ball as Jason
- Chontelle Moore as Rose
- Brandi Milton as Karen
- Quan Hodges as Dr. Wallace
  - Omarr Dixon as Dr. Wallace (FILMED VERSION)
- Palmer Williams Jr. as Monroe

== The Band ==
- Ronnie Garrett - Musical Director & Bass Guitar
- Derek Scott - Guitars
- Marcus Williams - Drums
- Justin Gilbert - Keyboards & Organ
- Natalie Ragins - Keyboards
- Michael Burton - Saxophone
- Jeff Bradshaw - Trombone
- Melvin Jones - Trumpet
- Aaron Draper - Percussion
- Lindsay Fields - Background Vocals
- Latayvia Cherry - Background Vocals
- Donny Sykes - Background Vocals

== Musical Numbers ==
All songs written and/or produced by Tyler Perry and Elvin D. Ross.

- "People Make the World Go Round" – Company
- "Nothing Left But God" – Aunt Bam
- "Even Me" – Donnie and Byron
- "What Do I Do?" – Shirley, Donnie, Joyce, Byron & Company
- "You Gave Me Jesus" – Joyce
- "You Are My Mama" – Donnie
- "Heaven Waits for Me" – Shirley & Company
- "You Are My Man" – Kimberly
- Medley
1. "Tonight Is the Night" – Aunt Bam
2. "Can't Hide Love" – Madea & Company
3. "Turn Off the Lights" – Monroe & Company
4. "(If Loving You Is Wrong) I Don't Want to Be Right" – Tammy
5. "I'm Going Down" – Joyce
6. "'Cause I Love You" – Byron & Company
- "If Only for One Night" – Harold

== Film adaptation ==
A film adaptation of the play was released on April 22, 2011.
