= Laugh to Keep from Crying =

2009 American stage play

- Original language: English
- Written by: Tyler Perry
- Characters: Carol, Belinda, Floyd, Niecy, Lisa, Tony, Anna, Peter, Jane, Donnie and Eddie
- Genre: Comedy-Drama
- Setting: Apartment complex

Premiere
- Date: October 6, 2009

Laugh to Keep from Crying is a 2009 American stage play created, produced, written and directed by Tyler Perry. The show first opened in the fall of 2009. The play is set at an inner-city building in a predominantly African-American neighborhood. It stars Cheryl Pepsii Riley as Carol, Palmer Williams Jr. as Floyd and Chandra Currelley-Young as Belinda. The live performance released on DVD on August 30, 2011 was recorded live in Atlanta at the Cobb Energy Performing Arts Centre in July 2010.

== Plot ==
The story revolves around a small group of people living in an inner-city building in a predominantly African-American neighborhood. Carol (Cheryl Pepsii Riley) is a single mother raising two teenagers: Tony (Donny Sykes), who is studious and participates in gospel choir; and Lisa (Tamar Davis), who is rebellious and refuses to attend church. She works long hours during the day, and is best friends with Belinda (Chandra Currelley-Young), their neighbor across the hall. Carol and Belinda disapprove of Niecey (D'Atra Hicks), their upstairs neighbor who is a prostitute. Peter (Wess Morgan) and Anna (Stephanie Ferrett) are a white couple who have moved into the building to save money while Peter attends law school. Anna's recently widowed mother, Jane (Rachel Richards) visits. Floyd (Palmer Williams Jr.) is the superintendent. Carol meets a police officer named Donnie (Anthony Dalton) then Niecy's pimp Eddie (Celestin Cornielle), who is bad to everybody involved.

== Tour Dates ==
Fall 2009
Date	City	Venue
October 6, 2009	Dayton	Schuster Performing Arts Center
October 7, 2009	Columbus	Veterans Memorial Auditorium
October 8, 2009	Salisbury	Wicomico Youth and Civic Center
October 9, 2009	Hampton	Hampton Coliseum
October 10, 2009	Hampton	Hampton Coliseum
October 13, 2009	Washington, D.C.	Warner Theatre
October 14, 2009	Washington, D.C.	Warner Theatre
October 15, 2009	Washington, D.C.	Warner Theatre
October 16, 2009	Washington, D.C.	Warner Theatre
October 17, 2009	Washington, D.C.	Warner Theatre
October 18, 2009	Washington, D.C.	Warner Theatre
October 20, 2009	Aiken	USC Aiken Convocation Center
October 21, 2009	Albany	Albany Civic Center
October 22, 2009	Columbus	Columbus Civic Center
October 24, 2009	Philadelphia	Liacouras Center
October 25, 2009	Philadelphia	Liacouras Center
October 27, 2009	Baltimore	Morgan State University
October 28, 2009	Baltimore	Morgan State University
October 29, 2009	Baltimore	Morgan State University
October 30, 2009	Baltimore	Morgan State University
October 31, 2009	Baltimore	Morgan State University
November 1, 2009	Baltimore	Morgan State University
November 3, 2009	Syracuse	Landmark Theatre
November 5, 2009	Richmond	Landmark Theatre
November 6, 2009	Richmond	Landmark Theatre
November 7, 2009	Pittsburgh	Petersen Events Center
November 8, 2009	Cincinnati	Aronoff Center for the Arts
November 10, 2009	South Bend	Morris Performing Arts Center
November 11, 2009	Peoria	Peoria Civic Center
November 12, 2009	Rockford	Coronado Theatre
November 13, 2009	Milwaukee	Milwaukee Theatre
November 14, 2009	Milwaukee	Milwaukee Theatre
November 15, 2009	Louisville	Louisville Palace
November 17, 2009	Grand Rapids	DeVos Performance Hall
November 18, 2009	East Lansing	Wharton Center for Performing Arts
November 19, 2009	Chicago	Arie Crown Theater
November 20, 2009	Chicago	Arie Crown Theater
November 21, 2009	Chicago	Arie Crown Theater
November 22, 2009	Chicago	Arie Crown Theater
November 24, 2009	Detroit	Music Hall Center for the Performing Arts
November 25, 2009	Detroit	Music Hall Center for the Performing Arts
November 26, 2009	Detroit	Music Hall Center for the Performing Arts
November 27, 2009	Detroit	Music Hall Center for the Performing Arts
November 28, 2009	Detroit	Music Hall Center for the Performing Arts
November 29, 2009	Detroit	Music Hall Center for the Performing Arts

DVD Taping - Summer 2010
Date	City	Venue
July 13, 2010	Atlanta	Cobb Energy Performing Arts Centre
July 14, 2010	Atlanta	Cobb Energy Performing Arts Centre

== Cast ==
- Chandra Currelley-Young as Belinda
- Cheryl Pepsii Riley as Carol
- Palmer Williams Jr. as Floyd
- D'Atra Hicks as Niecy
- Donny Sykes as Tony
- Tamar Davis as Lisa
- Stephanie Ferrett as Anna
- Chris Cauley as Peter
  - Wess Morgan (Taped Version)
- Rachel Richards as Jane
- Theo Williamson as Donnie
  - Anthony Dalton (Taped Version)
- Greg Stewart as Eddie
  - Celestin Cornielle (Taped Version)

== The Band ==
- Ronnie Garrett - Musical Director & Bass Guitar
- Derek Scott - Guitar
- Marcus Williams - Drums
- Michael Burton - Saxophone & Keyboards
- Natalie Ragins - Keyboards & Organ
- Lindsay Fields - Background Vocals
- Latayvia Cherry - Background Vocals
- Jeffrey Lewis - Background Vocals
- Zuri Craig - Background Vocals
- Crystal "Chrissy" Collins - Background Vocals

== Musical numbers ==
All songs written and/or produced by Tyler Perry and Elvin D. Ross.

1. "Wake Up Everybody" – Company
2. "We Can Work It Out" – Floyd & Niecy
3. "You Gave Me Hope" – Peter
4. "Lord, I Give It All to You" – Carol
5. "Church Medley"
  1. "I Will Trust in the Lord" – Carol
  2. "We've Come This Far By Faith" – Tony
  3. "He Will Fix It" – Belinda & Niecy
6. "I Better Get All My Rent" – Floyd
7. "Laugh to Keep from Crying" – Belinda
8. "Ooh Child" – Company
9. "I Need Thee" – Tony
10. "No More (I Wanna Be Redeemed)" – Niecy
11. "I'm Sorry, So Sorry" – Lisa
12. "Block Party Medley"
  1. "Shame" – Belinda
  2. "Square Biz" – Anna
  3. "Best of My Love" – Niecy
  4. "I'll Take You There" – Jane
  5. "Outstanding" – Peter
  6. "Ain't Nobody" – Carol
  7. "I Like" – Tony
13. "I Want You Back" – Lisa
