= Madea's Class Reunion =

2003 American stage play

- Original language: English
- Written by: Tyler Perry
- Characters: Madea, Dr. Willie Leroy Jones, Emma, Stephanie, Mr. Brown, Cora, Diana, Corey, Trina, Ann, Horace, Clarence and Victor
- Genre: Comedy-Drama
- Setting: Pandora Hotel

Premiere
- Date: January 3, 2003
- Place: Trenton

Madea's Class Reunion is a 2003 American stage play created, written, produced and directed by Tyler Perry. The live performance released on VHS and DVD on June 28, 2005 was recorded live in Detroit at the Fox Theatre on September 13, 2003. The play stars Tyler Perry as Madea and Dr. Willie Leroy Jones, David Mann as Leroy Brown and Tamela Mann as Cora.

== Plot ==
Tyler Perry's outrageous and tough granny character, Madea, is traveling to the Pandora Hotel, the venue for her 50-year class reunion. Running afoul of the law, Madea still manages to teach valuable lessons amidst the comedy and chaos, addressing the importance of forgiveness and the value of friendship. In addition to Madea, the insane bellboy/bartender, "Dr." Willie Leroy Jones (new character played by Perry), is causing ruckus in the already rowdy hotel before she even arrives. Willie is suffering from an unknown number of Mental illnesses claiming at times to be on lithium, Prozac, and Xanax and is likely criminally insane as he mentions a probation officer.

Madea, her daughter Cora, and her colorful crazy neighbor and classmate, Mr. Brown (whose wife from the previous play, Mattie, died from Alzheimer's complications and was cremated) help married couple Corey and Trina Jeffrey (Terrell Carter, Pam Taylor) come to terms with infidelity. A woman Stephanie (Cheryl "Pepsii" Riley) hurt by years of sexual and chemical torment must give up prostituting herself with her abusive husband (D'Wayne Gardner), and reconcile with her tired elderly mother Emma (Chandra Currelley-Young) who was fired by the evil manager of the Pandora, Ann (Chantell Christopher), who is having an affair with her son's father (Anselmo Gordon) who is married to Cora's friend Diana (Judy Peterson), who is too reliant on her man.

While all of this takes place, Madea enters with her usual flair and quickly cuts through all the lies and secrets and forces everyone to see their situations in a new light giving aid and advice to all. They save the Jeffreys’ marriage through the timely interruption of a would be affair with Ann by forcing the woman away and reminding the husband that he stilled loved his wife. Madea convinces Stephanie to break free of her husband and in so doing gain her independence, her self-respect, and a measure of revenge for all the years of abuse. In so doing Stephanie also reconciles with her mother healing their bond. Throughout Madea battles Ann and during a visit to the spa with Diana reveals the relationship between Ann and Diana's husband. Diana confronts Ann and is shocked to learned she has given the man a child and in response she kicks her husband out of her life and turns her life over to God.

In the finale we learn that Emma, a long time employee of the hotel, had spoken to the owner about her previous termination by Ann only to be reminded that her previous purchase of stocks in the company to keep it afloat during a financial crisis had blossomed proving her with an impressive fortune. Citing her cruel treatment of employees and her less than satisfying contact with customers Emma fires Ann much to everyone's delight. Before leaving Madea reveals that Mr. Brown is actually Cora's father much to Cora's then despair. Everyone is shown repairing their relationships as the play ends with a powerful and grateful appeal from the cast to Christ for his aid and his goodness.

== Tour dates ==
Scheduled shows
Date	City	Venue
January 3, 2003	Trenton	War Memorial Theatre
January 4, 2003	Trenton	War Memorial Theatre
January 5, 2003	Trenton	War Memorial Theatre
January 7, 2003	Philadelphia	Miller Theater
January 8, 2003	Philadelphia	Miller Theater
January 9, 2003	Philadelphia	Miller Theater
January 10, 2003	Philadelphia	Miller Theater
January 11, 2003	Philadelphia	Miller Theater
January 12, 2003	Philadelphia	Miller Theater
January 14, 2003	Memphis	Orpheum Theatre
January 15, 2003	Memphis	Orpheum Theatre
January 16, 2003	Memphis	Orpheum Theatre
January 17, 2003	Memphis	Orpheum Theatre
January 18, 2003	Memphis	Orpheum Theatre
January 19, 2003	Memphis	Orpheum Theatre
January 21, 2003	Philadelphia	Miller Theater
January 22, 2003	Philadelphia	Miller Theater
January 23, 2003	Philadelphia	Miller Theater
January 24, 2003	Philadelphia	Miller Theater
January 25, 2003	Philadelphia	Miller Theater
January 26, 2003	Philadelphia	Miller Theater
January 28, 2003	New Orleans	Saenger Theatre
January 29, 2003	New Orleans	Saenger Theatre
January 30, 2003	New Orleans	Saenger Theatre
January 31, 2003	New Orleans	Saenger Theatre
February 1, 2003	New Orleans	Saenger Theatre
February 2, 2003	New Orleans	Saenger Theatre
February 4, 2003	Chicago	New Regal Theater
February 5, 2003	Chicago	New Regal Theater
February 6, 2003	Chicago	New Regal Theater
February 7, 2003	Chicago	New Regal Theater
February 8, 2003	Chicago	New Regal Theater
February 9, 2003	Chicago	New Regal Theater
February 11, 2003	Hampton	Hampton Coliseum
February 12, 2003	Hampton	Hampton Coliseum
February 13, 2003	Columbia	Township Auditorium
February 14, 2003	Columbia	Township Auditorium
February 15, 2003	Columbia	Township Auditorium
February 16, 2003	Columbia	Township Auditorium
February 20, 2003	New Orleans	Saenger Theatre
February 21, 2003	New Orleans	Saenger Theatre
February 22, 2003	New Orleans	Saenger Theatre
February 23, 2003	New Orleans	Saenger Theatre
February 28, 2003	Charlotte	Ovens Auditorium
March 1, 2003	Charlotte	Ovens Auditorium
March 2, 2003	Charlotte	Ovens Auditorium
March 3, 2003	Charlotte	Ovens Auditorium
March 5, 2003	Atlanta	Fabulous Fox Theatre
March 6, 2003	Atlanta	Fabulous Fox Theatre
March 7, 2003	Atlanta	Fabulous Fox Theatre
March 8, 2003	Atlanta	Fabulous Fox Theatre
March 11, 2003	Chicago	New Regal Theater
March 12, 2003	Chicago	New Regal Theater
March 13, 2003	Chicago	New Regal Theater
March 14, 2003	Chicago	New Regal Theater
March 15, 2003	Chicago	New Regal Theater
March 16, 2003	Chicago	New Regal Theater
March 18, 2003	Chicago	New Regal Theater
March 19, 2003	Chicago	New Regal Theater
March 20, 2003	Chicago	New Regal Theater
March 21, 2003	Chicago	New Regal Theater
March 22, 2003	Chicago	New Regal Theater
March 23, 2003	Chicago	New Regal Theater
March 25, 2003	Dallas	Bruton Theatre
March 26, 2003	Dallas	Bruton Theatre
March 27, 2003	Dallas	Bruton Theatre
March 28, 2003	Dallas	Bruton Theatre
March 29, 2003	Dallas	Bruton Theatre
March 30, 2003	Dallas	Bruton Theatre
April 1, 2003	Washington, D.C.	Warner Theatre
April 2, 2003	Washington, D.C.	Warner Theatre
April 3, 2003	Washington, D.C.	Warner Theatre
April 4, 2003	Washington, D.C.	Warner Theatre
April 5, 2003	Washington, D.C.	Warner Theatre
April 6, 2003	Washington, D.C.	Warner Theatre
April 8, 2003	Baltimore	Morgan State University
April 9, 2003	Baltimore	Morgan State University
April 10, 2003	Baltimore	Morgan State University
April 11, 2003	Baltimore	Morgan State University
April 12, 2003	Baltimore	Morgan State University
April 13, 2003	Baltimore	Morgan State University
April 15, 2003	Washington, D.C.	Warner Theatre
April 16, 2003	Washington, D.C.	Warner Theatre
April 17, 2003	Washington, D.C.	Warner Theatre
April 18, 2003	Washington, D.C.	Warner Theatre
April 19, 2003	Washington, D.C.	Warner Theatre
April 20, 2003	Washington, D.C.	Warner Theatre
May 6, 2003	New York	Beacon Theatre
May 7, 2003	New York	Beacon Theatre
May 8, 2003	New York	Beacon Theatre
May 9, 2003	New York	Beacon Theatre
May 10, 2003	New York	Beacon Theatre
May 11, 2003	New York	Beacon Theatre
May 13, 2003	Nashville	Nashville Municipal Auditorium
May 14, 2003	Little Rock	Barton Coliseum
May 15, 2003	Memphis	Orpheum Theatre
May 16, 2003	Memphis	Orpheum Theatre
May 17, 2003	Memphis	Orpheum Theatre
May 18, 2003	Memphis	Orpheum Theatre
May 20, 2003	Washington, D.C.	Warner Theatre
May 21, 2003	Washington, D.C.	Warner Theatre
May 22, 2003	Washington, D.C.	Warner Theatre
May 23, 2003	Washington, D.C.	Warner Theatre
May 24, 2003	Washington, D.C.	Warner Theatre
May 25, 2003	Washington, D.C.	Warner Theatre
May 27, 2003	Philadelphia	Miller Theater
May 28, 2003	Philadelphia	Miller Theater
May 29, 2003	Philadelphia	Miller Theater
May 30, 2003	Philadelphia	Miller Theater
May 31, 2003	Philadelphia	Miller Theater
June 1, 2003	Philadelphia	Miller Theater
June 10, 2003	New York	Beacon Theatre
June 11, 2003	New York	Beacon Theatre
June 12, 2003	New York	Beacon Theatre
June 13, 2003	New York	Beacon Theatre
June 14, 2003	New York	Beacon Theatre
June 15, 2003	New York	Beacon Theatre
June 17, 2003	Baltimore	Murphy Fine Arts Center
June 18, 2003	Baltimore	Murphy Fine Arts Center
June 19, 2003	Baltimore	Murphy Fine Arts Center
June 20, 2003	Baltimore	Murphy Fine Arts Center
June 21, 2003	Baltimore	Murphy Fine Arts Center
June 22, 2003	Baltimore	Murphy Fine Arts Center
June 24, 2003	Winston-Salem	LJVM Coliseum
June 25, 2003	Winston-Salem	LJVM Coliseum
June 26, 2003	Richmond	Landmark Theatre
June 27, 2003	Richmond	Landmark Theatre
June 28, 2003	Richmond	Landmark Theatre
June 29, 2003	Richmond	Landmark Theatre
July 8, 2003	Dallas	Bruton Theatre
July 9, 2003	Dallas	Bruton Theatre
July 10, 2003	Dallas	Bruton Theatre
July 11, 2003	Dallas	Bruton Theatre
July 12, 2003	Dallas	Bruton Theatre
July 13, 2003	Dallas	Bruton Theatre
September 2, 2003	Los Angeles	Kodak Theatre
September 3, 2003	Los Angeles	Kodak Theatre
September 4, 2003	Los Angeles	Kodak Theatre
September 5, 2003	Los Angeles	Kodak Theatre
September 6, 2003	Los Angeles	Kodak Theatre
September 7, 2003	Los Angeles	Kodak Theatre
September 10, 2003	Detroit	Fox Theatre DVD Recording
September 11, 2003	Detroit	Fox Theatre DVD Recording
September 12, 2003	Detroit	Fox Theatre DVD Recording
September 13, 2003	Detroit	Fox Theatre DVD Recording
September 14, 2003	Detroit	Fox Theatre DVD Recording
September 17, 2003	Oakland	Paramount Theatre
September 18, 2003	Oakland	Paramount Theatre
September 19, 2003	Oakland	Paramount Theatre
September 20, 2003	Oakland	Paramount Theatre
September 21, 2003	Oakland	Paramount Theatre
September 24, 2003	Cleveland	State Theatre
September 25, 2003	Cleveland	State Theatre
September 26, 2003	Cleveland	State Theatre
September 27, 2003	Cleveland	State Theatre
September 28, 2003	Cleveland	State Theatre
September 30, 2003	Pittsburgh	Benedum Center
October 1, 2003	Pittsburgh	Benedum Center
October 2, 2003	Pittsburgh	Benedum Center
October 3, 2003	Pittsburgh	Benedum Center
October 4, 2003	Pittsburgh	Benedum Center
October 5, 2003	Columbus	Nationwide Arena
October 7, 2003	Newark	Symphony Hall
October 8, 2003	Newark	Symphony Hall
October 9, 2003	Newark	Symphony Hall
October 10, 2003	Newark	Symphony Hall
October 11, 2003	Newark	Symphony Hall
October 12, 2003	Newark	Symphony Hall
October 14, 2003	Houston	Verizon Wireless Theatre
October 15, 2003	Houston	Verizon Wireless Theatre
October 16, 2003	Houston	Verizon Wireless Theatre
October 17, 2003	Houston	Verizon Wireless Theatre
October 18, 2003	Houston	Verizon Wireless Theatre
October 19, 2003	Houston	Verizon Wireless Theatre
October 21, 2003	Tulsa	Brady Theater
October 22, 2003	Tulsa	Brady Theater
October 23, 2003	Kansas City	Midland Theatre
October 24, 2003	Kansas City	Midland Theatre
October 25, 2003	Kansas City	Midland Theatre
October 26, 2003	Kansas City	Midland Theatre
October 28, 2003	St. Louis	The Fox Theatre
October 29, 2003	St. Louis	The Fox Theatre
October 30, 2003	St. Louis	The Fox Theatre
October 31, 2003	St. Louis	The Fox Theatre
November 1, 2003	St. Louis	The Fox Theatre
November 2, 2003	St. Louis	The Fox Theatre
November 4, 2003	Miami	James L. Knight Center
November 5, 2003	Miami	James L. Knight Center
November 6, 2003	Miami	James L. Knight Center
November 7, 2003	Miami	James L. Knight Center
November 8, 2003	Miami	James L. Knight Center
November 9, 2003	Miami	James L. Knight Center
November 11, 2003	Biloxi	Mississippi Coast Coliseum
November 12, 2003	Biloxi	Mississippi Coast Coliseum
November 13, 2003	Jacksonville	Times-Union Center for the Performing Arts
November 14, 2003	Jacksonville	Times-Union Center for the Performing Arts
November 15, 2003	Jacksonville	Times-Union Center for the Performing Arts
November 16, 2003	Jacksonville	Times-Union Center for the Performing Arts
November 18, 2003	Savannah	Savannah Civic Center
November 19, 2003	Savannah	Savannah Civic Center
November 21, 2003	Hampton	Hampton Coliseum
November 22, 2003	Hampton	Hampton Coliseum
November 23, 2003	Hampton	Hampton Coliseum
November 25, 2003	Greenville	Bi-Lo Center
November 26, 2003	Greenville	Bi-Lo Center
November 27, 2003	Birmingham	Birmingham-Jefferson Convention Complex
November 28, 2003	Birmingham	Birmingham-Jefferson Convention Complex
November 29, 2003	Birmingham	Birmingham-Jefferson Convention Complex
November 30, 2003	Birmingham	Birmingham-Jefferson Convention Complex
January 5, 2004	Seattle	Paramount Theatre
January 6, 2004	Seattle	Paramount Theatre
January 7, 2004	Seattle	Paramount Theatre
January 9, 2004	Las Vegas	Aladdin Resort and Casino
January 10, 2004	Las Vegas	Aladdin Resort and Casino
January 13, 2004	Sacramento	Sacramento Community Center Theatre
January 14, 2004	Sacramento	Sacramento Community Center Theatre
January 15, 2004	Oakland	Paramount Theatre
January 16, 2004	Oakland	Paramount Theatre
January 17, 2004	Oakland	Paramount Theatre
January 18, 2004	Oakland	Paramount Theatre
January 22, 2004	Los Angeles	Kodak Theatre
January 23, 2004	Los Angeles	Kodak Theatre
January 24, 2004	Los Angeles	Kodak Theatre
January 25, 2004	Los Angeles	Kodak Theatre
February 18, 2004	Tampa	Tampa Bay Performing Arts Center
February 19, 2004	Tampa	Tampa Bay Performing Arts Center
February 20, 2004	Tallahassee	Tallahassee-Leon County Civic Center
February 21, 2004	Orlando	Orange County Convention Center
February 22, 2004	Orlando	Orange County Convention Center
February 24, 2004	Jacksonville	Times-Union Center for the Performing Arts
February 25, 2004	Jacksonville	Times-Union Center for the Performing Arts
February 26, 2004	Jacksonville	Times-Union Center for the Performing Arts
February 27, 2004	Miami	James L. Knight Center
February 28, 2004	Miami	James L. Knight Center
February 29, 2004	Miami	James L. Knight Center
March 16, 2004	Montgomery	Joe L. Reed Acadome
March 17, 2004	Montgomery	Joe L. Reed Acadome
March 18, 2004	Jackson	Mississippi Coliseum
March 19, 2004	Jackson	Mississippi Coliseum
March 20, 2004	Jackson	Mississippi Coliseum
March 21, 2004	Jackson	Mississippi Coliseum
March 22, 2004	Beaumont	Beaumont Civic Center
March 23, 2004	Beaumont	Beaumont Civic Center
March 24, 2004	San Antonio	San Antonio Municipal Auditorium
March 25, 2004	San Antonio	San Antonio Municipal Auditorium
March 26, 2004	Austin	Frank Erwin Center
March 27, 2004	Austin	Frank Erwin Center
March 30, 2004	Flint	Perani's Event Center
March 31, 2004	Flint	Perani's Event Center
April 1, 2004	Detroit	Fox Theatre
April 2, 2004	Detroit	Fox Theatre
April 3, 2004	Detroit	Fox Theatre
April 4, 2004	Detroit	Fox Theatre
April 6, 2004	South Bend	Morris Performing Arts Center
April 7, 2004	South Bend	Morris Performing Arts Center
April 8, 2004	St. Louis	Fox Theatre
April 9, 2004	St. Louis	Fox Theatre
April 10, 2004	St. Louis	Fox Theatre
April 11, 2004	St. Louis	Fox Theatre
April 19, 2004	Fayetteville	Crown Center of Cumberland County
April 20, 2004	Fayetteville	Crown Center of Cumberland County
April 21, 2004	Fayetteville	Crown Center of Cumberland County
April 23, 2004	Nashville	Nashville Municipal Auditorium
April 24, 2004	Nashville	Nashville Municipal Auditorium
April 25, 2004	Nashville	Nashville Municipal Auditorium
April 27, 2004	Louisville	Whitney Hall
April 28, 2004	Louisville	Whitney Hall
April 29, 2004	Louisville	Whitney Hall
April 30, 2004	Greensboro	Greensboro Coliseum Complex
May 1, 2004	Greensboro	Greensboro Coliseum Complex
May 2, 2004	Greensboro	Greensboro Coliseum Complex
May 4, 2004	Houston	Verizon Wireless Theatre
May 5, 2004	Houston	Verizon Wireless Theatre
May 6, 2004	Houston	Verizon Wireless Theatre
May 7, 2004	Houston	Verizon Wireless Theatre
May 8, 2004	Houston	Verizon Wireless Theatre
May 9, 2004	Houston	Verizon Wireless Theatre
May 11, 2004	Chattanooga	Soldiers and Sailors Memorial Auditorium
May 12, 2004	Chattanooga	Soldiers and Sailors Memorial Auditorium
May 13, 2004	Memphis	Orpheum Theatre
May 14, 2004	Memphis	Orpheum Theatre
May 15, 2004	Memphis	Orpheum Theatre
May 16, 2004	Memphis	Orpheum Theatre

== Original live cast ==
- Tyler Perry as Madea and Dr. Willie Leroy Jones
- Chandra Currelley-Young as Emma
- David Mann as Mr. Brown
- Tamela Mann as Cora
- Cheryl Pepsii Riley as Stephanie
- Judy Peterson as Diana Massey
- Terrell Carter as Corey Jeffrey
- Pam Taylor as Trina Jeffrey
- Kinnik Sky as Ann
- D'Wayne Gardner as Horace
- Anselmo Gordon as Clarence Massey
- Ahmad Jamal McGhee as DJ & Waiter
- Donna Stewart - Understudy

== Live film cast ==
- Tyler Perry as Madea and Dr. Willie Leroy Jones
- Chandra Currelley-Young as Emma
- David Mann as Mr. Brown
- Tamela Mann as Cora
- Cheryl Pepsii Riley as Stephanie
- Judy Peterson as Diana Massey
- Terrell Carter as Corey Jeffrey
- Pam Taylor as Trina Jeffrey
- Chantell Christopher as Ann
- D'Wayne Gardner as Horace
- Anselmo Gordon as Clarence Massey
- Ahmad Jamal McGhee as DJ & Waiter

== The original band ==
- Mike Frazier - Bass
- Erick Morgan - Drums
- John Forbes - Keyboards
- Elvin Ross - Musical Director/Keyboards
- Mike Charbonneau - Sound
- Bruce Danz - Sound

== 2003 Band ==
- Mike Frazier - Musical Director/Bass Guitar
- Erick Morgan - Drums
- Jimmy Wyatt - Keyboards
- Sean Allen - Keyboard
- Mike Charbonneau - Sound
- Bruce Danz - Sound

== Musical numbers ==
All songs written and/or produced by Tyler Perry.

- “Overture" - Band
- "To Everything There is a Season" – Cora
- "Old Time Medley" – Brown, Emma and Cora
- "What Can I Do" – Trina
- "I Need Thee" – Emma
- "Love Should Have Brought You Home" – Corey
- "Taking My Life Back" – Stephanie
- "My Man is Not Your Man" – Diana
- "You Can Make It (Through The Night)" – Diana, Cora, Emma, Stephanie, Corey, Trina and Company
