= Palmer Williams Jr. =

American actor and singer

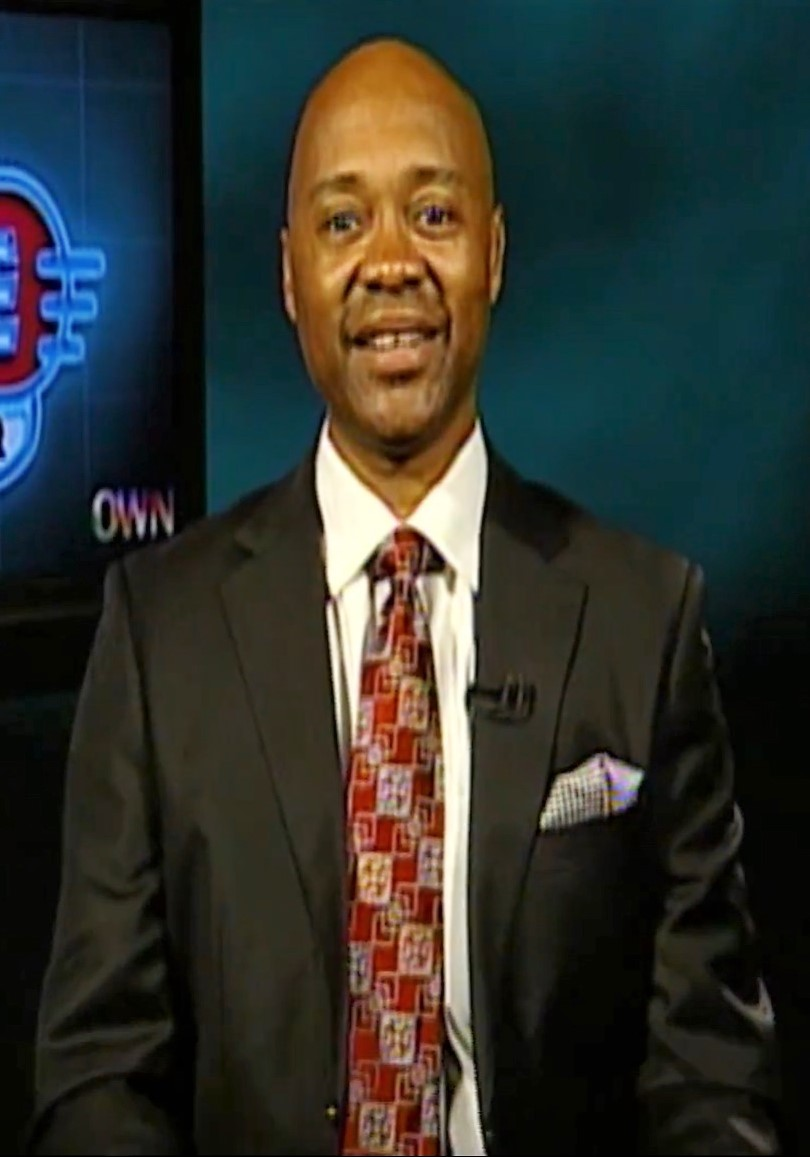
- Williams in 2014
- Occupations: Actor, singer

Palmer Williams Jr. is an American actor and singer. He is best known for his roles as Floyd Jackson on both Tyler Perry's House of Payne and the sitcom Love Thy Neighbor.

== Career ==
Williams was born to Palmer Williams Sr. and Julia Williams. His mother died of cancer in 1973. Williams began studying at Knoxville College in 1982 where he received a bachelor's of science degree in health administration in 1989. He had a music scholarship while attending the university and in his senior year was the president of the student government. Williams took part in Apollo Theater competitions that he placed first in.

He is a native of Camden, Alabama. He appears in Tyler Perry's productions including Madea's Big Happy Family, Laugh to Keep from Crying and others during his career. He also appeared with his family on Family Feud in 2014.

== Filmography ==
Film
Year	Title	Role	Notes
2008	The Marriage Counselor	Floyd Jackson	Play; Direct-to-video
2010	Madea's Big Happy Family	Monroe	Play; Direct-to-video
2011	Madea's Big Happy Family (film)	Manager	Minor role
2011	Laugh to Keep from Crying	Floyd	Play; Direct-to-video
2013	I Don't Want to Do Wrong	Reverend Wallace	Play; Direct-to-video
2013	The Haves And The Have Nots	Floyd	Play; Direct-to-video
2019	Little	Police Officer	Minor role

Television
Year	Title	Role	Notes
2009–2012, 2020–2022	Tyler Perry's House of Payne	Floyd Stanley Jackson	Recurring role; (seasons 3-7, 9); Main role (seasons 8, 10); 68 episodes
2013–2017	Love Thy Neighbor	Floyd Stanley Jackson	Main role
2021	Chicago P.D.	Security Guard 2	Episode: "End of Watch"
