= Chandra Currelley-Young =

American actress and singer

- Born: Chandra Currelley; August 30, 1961 (age 64); Jacksonville, Florida, U.S.
- Occupations: Actress, Singer
- Years active: 1986 – Present
- Known for: Tyler Perry's For Better Or Worse - Miss V Tyler Perry's Madea's Big Happy Family The Play - Shirley Tyler Perry's Diary Of A Mad Black Woman - Chandra Band Member In The S.O.S. Band
- Spouse: Larry Young
- Children: Agape Young
- Website: www.chandracurrelley.com

Chandra Currelley-Young (born August 30, 1961) is an American actress and singer. Currelley has done extensive work with director and writer Tyler Perry, and has played many roles in his various productions and several stage plays. In all of her stage appearances she is known for doing her signature "Holy Shake" where she shakes her shoulders while singing and the audience responds in ovation.

== Life and career ==
Currelley-Young was a member of the SOS Band from the late 1980s up until 1992, when she left the band to pursue a career in acting and theater. Because of her background in theater, Currelley-Young was selected by Debbie Allen to be the featured soloist in her production "Soul Possessed" which debuted at the Alliance Theater in Atlanta, Georgia.

Currelley-Young was asked to perform in the 1995 Apollo Revival of The Wiz as Evillene The Wicked Witch of The West and was then selectively chosen to act in David Petrarca's hit production, Dinah Was, the story of singer Dinah Washington. She established her acting career by appearing in Tyler Perry's Madea's Big Happy Family and many other of his productions.

== Filmography ==
Film
Year	Film	Role	Notes
1999	I Know I've Been Changed	Emma	Not Recorded
2003	Madea's Class Reunion	Emma	Direct-to-DVD release
2005	Diary of a Mad Black Woman	Herself	
2007	What's Done in the Dark	Brenda	Direct-to-DVD release
2009	Crowns	Mother Shaw	
2009	Laugh to Keep from Crying	Belinda	Direct-to-DVD release
2010	Madea's Big Happy Family	Shirley	Direct-to-DVD release
2011	Madea's Big Happy Family	Sister Laura	
2011	A Madea Christmas	Lillian Mansell	Direct-to-DVD release
2013	Madea Gets a Job	Barbra Nichols	Direct-to-DVD release
2013	The Samurai	Fran Wyman	
Television
Year	Title	Role	Notes
2011–2017	For Better or Worse	Miss V	Regular
2020–present	Bruh	Alice Watts	Regular
