= Madea's Big Happy Family (film) =

- Theatrical release poster
- Directed by: Tyler Perry
- Written by: Tyler Perry
- Based on: Madea's Big Happy Family by Tyler Perry
- Produced by: Tyler Perry; Reuben Cannon; Roger M. Bobb
- Starring: Loretta Devine; Bow Wow; David Mann; Cassi Davis; Tamela Mann; Lauren London; Isaiah Mustafa; Rodney Perry; Shannon Kane; Tyler Perry
- Cinematography: Toyomichi Kurita
- Edited by: Maysie Hoy
- Music by: Aaron Zigman
- Production company: Tyler Perry Studios
- Distributed by: Lionsgate
- Release date: April 22, 2011
- Running time: 106 minutes
- Country: United States
- Language: English
- Budget: $25 million
- Box office: $53.3 million

Madea's Big Happy Family is a 2011 American comedy-drama film based on Tyler Perry's 2010 play of the same name. It is the 11th film in the Tyler Perry film franchise and the sixth in the Madea film franchise. Tyler Perry reprised Madea and Joe, and the other cast members include Loretta Devine, Bow Wow, David Mann, Cassi Davis, Tamela Mann, Lauren London, Isaiah Mustafa, Natalie Desselle, Teyana Taylor, Rodney Perry, and Shannon Kane. It tells the story of Madea finding out that her niece is dying from cancer as she gathers her niece's children and their family members together to deal with the news while contending with the different issues between them. Madea's Big Happy Family grossed $53.3 million.

== Plot ==
While visiting Dr. Evans with Aunt Bam, Madea's niece Shirley discovers her cancer has gotten worse and she may only have a few weeks to live. She invites her children to dinner to tell them all at once. Cora Simmons and her father Leroy Brown are also at the hospital where a colonoscopy on Mr. Brown shows a growth that needs to be surgically removed. Meanwhile, Madea drives through the restaurant Snax because its young manager Sabrina delayed taking her order until after breakfast was over for the day.

Shirley's children are Byron, on probation for selling drugs and in a relationship with the selfish gold-digging Renee with a son from a previous relationship; Tammy, who has marital issues with her husband Harold and their undisciplined children; and Kimberly, filled with anger issues and mistreats her husband Calvin, her son C.J. and her family. They arrive for dinner and instantly start arguing. Byron's ex and mother of his child Sabrina then arrives. Using her son's child support money and supplies for herself, she tries to goad Byron back into illegal activities in order to get more.

Bam goes to Madea's house, seeking help for Shirley. Byron and Renee sneak into Shirley's house to sleep and Byron is arrested for back child support. Shirley goes to Kimberly to help her bail Byron out. Despite Kimberly's refusal, Calvin volunteers to help. The next day, Calvin bails out Byron with help from one of his lawyer friends. However, the arrest costs Byron his job. During the day, Madea gathers Shirley's children to go over to their mother's house for another dinner. At Harold's garage, she instills some manners into their kids.

That night, they have dinner as a family. Sabrina leaves her son with Byron and Kimberly arrives late. An argument ensues with Tammy revealing that Kimberly got pregnant at 13 and had Shirley raise the child for her. Kimberly leaves and Byron is revealed to be the child in question. Angry and heartbroken that his family kept this a secret from him, Byron leaves as well with Shirley chasing after him. An argument between Harold and Tammy concludes with him demanding that Tammy start respecting him as earlier advised by Madea and she apologizes .Calvin leaves Kimberly and takes C.J. with him.

The next day, Byron is humiliated by Sabrina on Maury and returns to the drug trade. The episode is seen by Madea and Joe as Cora reveals that her blood is not a match for Mr. Brown. By contrast, Harold and Tammy's relationship and their kids seem to be improving. With all the drama and arguing going on, Shirley is unable to tell the family about her cancer.

Over time, Shirley's condition worsens and she is rushed to the hospital, where she reveals to her children (sans Kimberly) that she has cancer, tells her family that she loves them and later dies. Kimberly arrives and is told by Calvin that Shirley has died.

Days later, a funeral service is held and Shirley is buried. At the repast, Madea intimidates Sabrina to stop hassling Byron, abusing his hard-earned money, and using their child to make his life miserable. She then confronts Byron that he should care for his son by getting a stable job, warning him if he continues down the wrong path, he will end up dead or back in prison and that once he goes down, Renee will just move on to the next man with the most money. She also tells Sabrina and Byron to settle their differences and start working together on raising their child. Madea also reveals that Kimberly was raped by her paternal uncle when she was 12, resulting in her having Byron at 13, and explaining her bitterness and anger towards her family. Kimberly has to forgive in order to find peace and to treat her husband and son better. She apologizes to Calvin, agreeing to get help to fix their marriage, and they reconcile. Taking Madea's words to heart, Byron decides to prioritize his son and breaks up with Renee.

Madea, Mr. Brown and Cora appear on Maury to find out if Mr. Brown is Cora's father. Madea insists so, but, following an argument, it turns out he is not. Madea departs in hysterics with Joe at home, watching it unfold on TV.

== Cast ==
- Tyler Perry as:
  - Mabel "Madea" Simmons, Shirley’s tough aunt and grandaunt of Shirley’s children.
  - Joe Simmons, the brother of Madea
- Loretta Devine as Shirley, the niece of Madea and Aunt Bam
- Bow Wow as Byron, an ex con, and the son of Shirley and a grandnephew of Madea and Aunt Bam, later revealed to be her grandson (as well as Madea and Aunt Bam’s great-grandnephew) and Kimberly’s son from being raped by her uncle
- Tamela Mann as Cora Brown, the daughter of Madea
- David Mann as Leroy Brown, the supposed father of Cora Simmons
- Cassi Davis as Betty Ann "Aunt Bam" Murphy, the cousin of Madea and the aunt of Shirley
- Lauren London as Renee, the gold-digging girlfriend of Byron
- Shannon Kane as Kimberly, a real estate agent, the daughter of Shirley, a grandniece of Madea and Aunt Bam, and the biological mother of Byron upon being raped by her uncle
- Isaiah Mustafa as Calvin, the husband of Kimberly
- Natalie Desselle-Reid as Tammy, the daughter of Shirley, a grandniece of Madea and Aunt Bam, and co-owner of an auto-repair garage
- Rodney Perry as Harold, the husband of Tammy and co-owner of an auto-repair garage
- Steven Wash Jr. as H.J., the elder son of Tammy and Harold, as well as a grandson of Shirley, and a great-grandnephew of Madea and Aunt Bam
- Nicholas Milton as Will, the younger son of Tammy and Harold, as well as a grandson of Shirley, and a great-grandnephew of Madea and Aunt Bam
- Benjamin 'LB' Aiken as C.J., the son of Kimberly and Calvin, as well as the grandson of Shirley, and a great-grandnephew of Madea and Aunt Bam
- Teyana Taylor as Sabrina, the nagging ex-girlfriend of Byron and manager of Snax
- Philip Anthony-Rodriguez as Dr. Evans, a doctor who oversees the medical treatments of Shirley and Mr. Brown
- Palmer Williams Jr. as Mr. Mills, the manager of Lam Co. Imports
- Ron Grant as Pastor Jackson, a pastor who oversees Shirley's funeral
- Chandra Currelley as Sister Laura; the actress also portrayed Shirley in the original stage play.
- Maury Povich as himself; he hears the different cases of Sabrina and Cora

== Release ==
=== Box office ===
Madea's Big Happy Family was released on April 22, 2011. It pulled in $25,068,677 on its opening weekend, ranking #2 at the box office behind Rio. By the end of its run, the $25 million film grossed $53,345,287 in the United States.

=== Critical reception ===
Based on 41 reviews collected by Rotten Tomatoes, the film has an approval rating of 37% with an average rating of 4.60/10. Metacritic gave the film an average rating of 45 based on 15 reviews, indicating "mixed or average reviews". Audiences polled by CinemaScore gave the film an A grade.

== Home media ==
Madea's Big Happy Family was released on DVD and Blu-ray on August 30, 2011. The DVD features four featurettes: "By-reen: The Baby Mama from Hell", "Ties That Bind", "Madea's Family Tree", and "Brown Calls Maury". The Blu-ray contains these features as well as a digital copy.

== See also ==
- List of black films of the 2010s
