= D'atra Hicks =

American actress

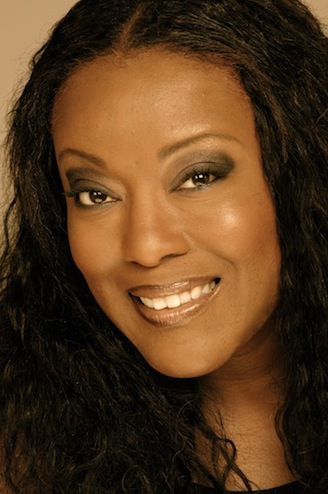
- Born: Deitra Cherelle Hicks; December 27, 1967 (age 58); Harlem, New York City, U.S.
- Education: Harry S. Truman High School
- Occupations: Actress; singer
- Family: Taral Hicks (sister)
- Musical career
- Genres: Jazz; R&B; Soul; Gospel
- Years active: 1985–present
- Labels: Capitol; Digital Jukebox
- Website: datrahicks.com

D'Atra Hicks (born Deitra Cherelle Hicks; is an American actress and singer. Hicks is best known for her role as Jackie Simmons in Tyler Perry's 2002 stage play Madea's Family Reunion. Hicks has also performed as Nurse Trudy in the 2006 stage play What's Done in the Dark and as Niecy in the 2009 play Laugh to Keep from Crying.

== Life and career ==
Born in Harlem, Hicks began performing in her grandfather's church choir as a child. In her early teens, Hicks and her older sister Miriam formed a singing group "The Hicks Sisters" and eventually cut a demo. The duo's demo caught the attention of Broadway producers of the stage play Mama I Want To Sing! were impressed by Hicks' voice. In late 1985, Hicks was offered the lead role of Doris Winter in the play, in which she portrayed from April 1986 until 1990. The play eventually became the most successful off-Broadway black musical in theatrical history.

During her time on Broadway, Hicks received a solo deal with Capitol Records. Hicks released her self-titled debut album on September 9, 1989 featuring production contributions from Narada Michael Walden and Nick Martinelli, Hicks' album debuted at number 63 and sat 10 weeks on the Top R&B Albums chart. During her time on the label, she recorded duets with Peabo Bryson, Evan Rogers and Freddie Jackson.

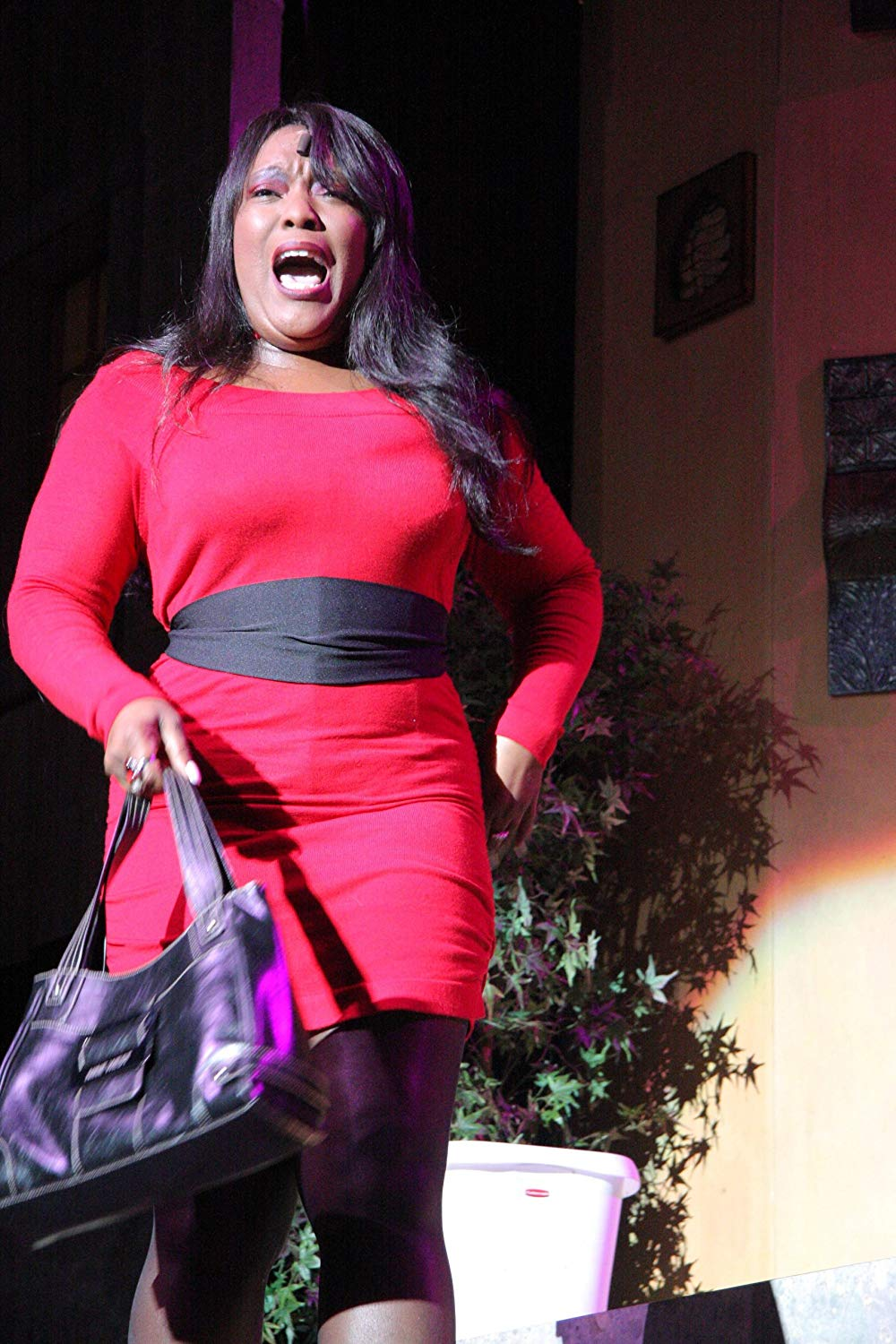
Hicks performing in Tyler Perry's stage play Laugh to Keep from Crying, 2009

Hicks later scored roles in several Tyler Perry stage plays beginning with 2002's Madea's Family Reunion and continuing in 2006's What's Done in the Dark. In 2009, she starred in Perry's Laugh to Keep from Crying as Neicey, a prostitute who is seeking to turn her life around.

In 2018, American playwright, comedian and director JD Lawrence asked Hicks to take part in a new reality show on Bravo's Your Husband is Cheating On Us, along with Ginuwine, Tondy Gallant, Lia Grant and Kristen Plati.

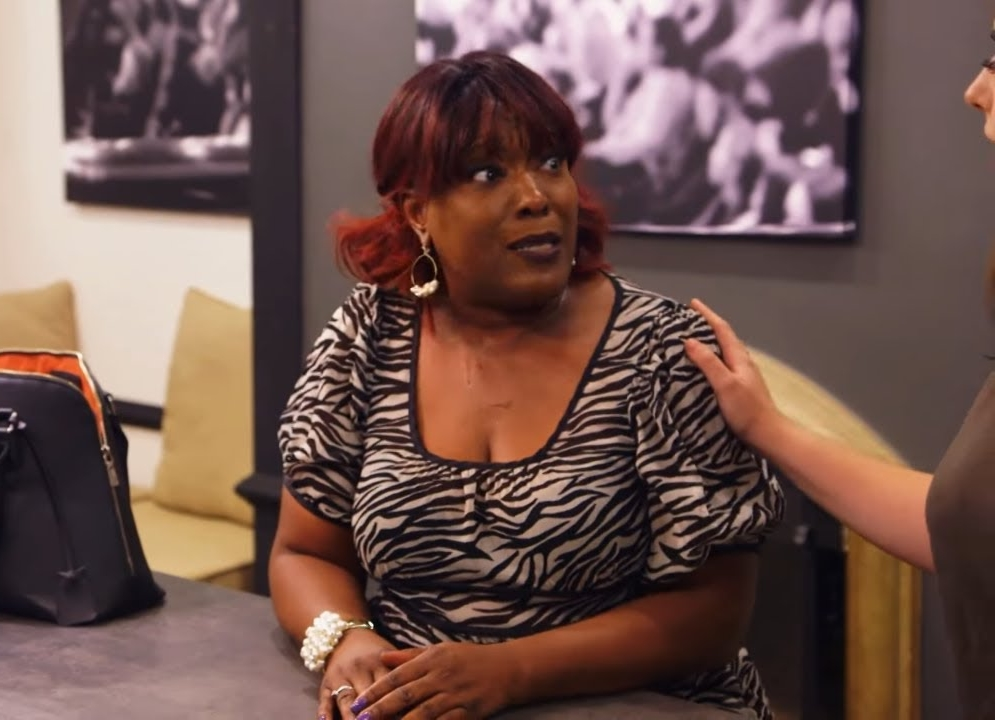
Hicks appearing on the Bravo reality television series Your Husband Is Cheating On Us, 2018

Hicks also provided vocals on Earnest Pugh's 2018 album The UnSung Hits Vol. 1 (EPM Music Group/ Entertainment One), which was produced by Cedric Thompson, Michael Bereal and Keith Williams.

== Personal life ==
Hicks is the older sister of actress and singer Taral Hicks. No sources have either confirmed or denied that Hicks has ever been married. Hicks has one child, Diamond Grant, with actor Tony Grant.

=== Divorce Court ===
Hicks took part in a known fictitious comedy sketch on daytime TV with an actor called Loren Harper where a courtroom drama episode where during the case of Harper vs. Hicks, the defendant breaks into song on the episode of Divorce Court aired September 2010. One notable episode where defendant, Deitra (D’Atra) Hicks, Actress from What's Done in the Dark and Tyler_Perry's Madea’s Family Reunion, admits to physically abusing her husband, but has taken anger management classes where she learned to express her rage through song, not violence.

Harper begins to give his testimony, claiming that his drug use and alcoholism are a direct result of the abuse suffered at the hands of Ms. Hicks, therefore she is responsible for compensating him for his therapy sessions. He is interrupted by a gospel-style “Hhhhmmmhhhmm” from Hicks’ direction, but doesn’t stop talking until Judge Lynn_Toler interjects to ask, in the most polite manner she can muster, what the hell is going on with Hicks. The minutes that follow are the finest footage in the televised justice system, complete with private investigators, infidelity, theft, face-to-face confrontation of the mistress, and Lord have mercy Jesus! There is singing. Pop open a bottle of Cooks and enjoy.

== Chart positions ==
=== Albums ===
Year	Album details	Peak chart positions		Record label
Year	Album details	US R&B	UK	Record label
1989	D'atra Hicks	63	–	Capitol Records
2007	Finally My Time	25	–	–

=== Singles ===
Title	Year	Peak chart positions	
Title	Year	US R&B	US Dance
"Sweet Talk"	1989	8	24
"You Make Me Want to Give It Up"	1989	51	—
