= Ryan Shaw =

American soul musician from Georgia (born 1980)

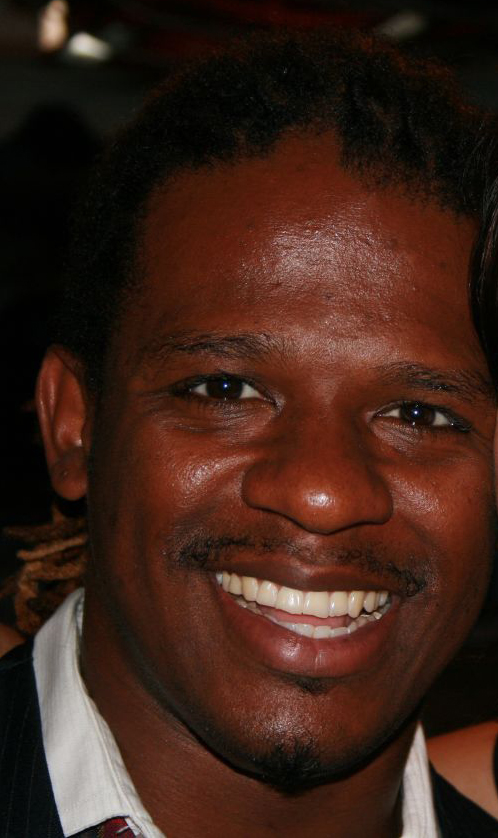
- Ryan Shaw in 2007.

Background information
- Born: Ryan Shaw; December 25, 1980 (age 45)
- Origin: Decatur, Georgia
- Genres: R&B; Soul
- Years active: 1998–present
- Labels: RED, Columbia, Razor & Tie, OneHaven, Dynotone
- Website: ryanshaw.com

Ryan Christopher Shaw (born December 25, 1980) is an American soul musician from Georgia. He is part of the soul-revival movement in music and has been nominated for a Grammy three times, in the category of Best Traditional R&B Performance.

== Biography ==
Shaw is from Decatur, Georgia. He learned to sing at the Free Church of God in Christ of Atlanta, Georgia and began singing harmony in a church choir at age five. In a 2007 interview, Shaw stated "My church was very traditional, and for a long time the only songs I learned were gospel songs."

Shaw won a spot in a gospel musical at Georgia State University, and in 1998 he dropped out of college to take part in Tyler Perry's play I Know I've Been Changed. At the end of the play's run he began doing Motown covers in New York, joining the group Fabulous Soul Shakers in 2004. He recorded a demo in 2006, won the ear of Columbia Records, and was signed to said label. The album, This is Ryan Shaw, mixes new material with covers of songs by Wilson Pickett, Bobby Womack, and Jackie Wilson. He was the opening act for the Van Halen tour 07-08.

At the end of 2009, Shaw reached some fame in the Netherlands with his single It Gets Better, which peaked at number 2 on the single top 100 charts. On May 15, 2012 Ryan Shaw released Real Love on Dynotone Records.

In 2013, Shaw made his debut on Broadway, playing Stevie Wonder in Motown: The Musical. In June 2015, Shaw advanced from the auditions to Judge Cuts Week on season 10 of America's Got Talent. However, in July 2015, he was eliminated from the competition during Judge Cuts Week 2. In 2018, Shaw played Judas in the Regent's Park Open Air Theatre/Lyric Opera of Chicago production of Jesus Christ Superstar.

== Awards and nominations ==
=== Grammy Award ===
Year	Nominee / work	Award	Result
2008	"I Am Your Man"	Best Traditional R&B Vocal Performance	Nominated
2011	"In Between"	Best Traditional R&B Vocal Performance	Nominated
2014	"Yesterday"	Best Traditional R&B Vocal Performance	Nominated

== Discography ==
- This Is Ryan Shaw (2007) #22 Billboard Heatseekers
- It Gets Better (2010)
- Real Love (2012)
- Imagining Marvin (2020)
