= Madea's Family Reunion (play) =

Play written by Tyler Perry

- Original language: English
- Written by: Tyler Perry
- Characters: Madea, Jackie, Reverend Johnny Lewis, Cora, Mr. Brown, Vickie, A.J. Mattie, Kevin, Lisa, Ronnie and Tina
- Genre: Comedy-Drama
- Setting: Madea’s Backyard

Premiere
- Date: January 4, 2002
- Place: Augusta, Georgia, U.S.

Madea's Family Reunion is a 2002 American stage musical written and produced by Tyler Perry. Described as gospel theater, the play stars Tyler Perry as his recurring character, the grandmother Madea; D'Atra Hicks as Jackie, David Mann as Mr. Brown; and Tamela Mann as Cora. The live performance released on VHS and DVD was recorded live in New Orleans at the Saenger Theatre in January 2002.

It was made into a film in 2006.

== 2002 Film Cast ==
- Tyler Perry as Madea
- D'Atra Hicks as Jackie
- Terry Phillips as Kevin
- Tamela Mann as Cora
- David Mann as Mr. Brown
- Quan Howell as Reverend Johnny Lewis
- Pebbles Johnson as Vickie
- Sonya Evans as Lisa
- Gary Jenkins as A.J.
- Zakiya Williams as Tina
- Mike Storm as Ronnie
- Regina McCrary as Mattie
- James Tittle IV as Brian
- Kim Easterling as Aquaneesha

== 2002 Live Cast ==
- Tyler Perry as Madea
- D'Atra Hicks as Jackie
- Terry Phillips as Kevin
- Tamela Mann as Cora
- David Mann as Mr. Brown
- Issac Carre as Reverend Johnny Lewis
- Pebbles Johnson as Vickie
- Sonya Evans as Lisa
- Gary Jenkins as A.J.
- Zakiya Williams as Tina
- Mike Storm as Ronnie
- Regina McCrary as Mattie
- James Tittle IV as Brian
- Kim Easterling as Aquaneesha
- Donna Stewart - Understudy

== The Band ==
- Musical Director/Keyboards - Elvin Ross
- Keyboards - John Forbes
- Drums - Erick Morgan
- Bass - Mike Frazier

== Musical Numbers ==
All songs written and/or produced by Tyler Perry and Elvin D. Ross.

- "I Miss My Old Friend" – Cora
- "Old Time Mix (consists of Jesus Will Fix It, On the Battlefield, Trouble in My Way, and Have You Tried Jesus?)" - Reverend Johnny, Mattie, Cora, and Brown
- "It Ain't Over" – A.J.
- "How Much Can One Heart Take?" – Jackie
- "Open My Heart" – Vickie
- "Marriage Can Be Love" – Reverend Johnny
- "I Can Say I'm Sorry" – Kevin and Jackie
- "A Family That Prays Together" – Company

== Tour Dates ==
Scheduled shows
Date	City	Venue
January 4, 2002	Augusta	Bell Auditorium
January 5, 2002	Augusta	Bell Auditorium
January 10, 2002	Memphis	Orpheum Theatre
January 11, 2002	Memphis	Orpheum Theatre
January 12, 2002	Memphis	Orpheum Theatre
January 13, 2002	Memphis	Orpheum Theatre
January 15, 2002	Philadelphia	Merriam Theatre
January 16, 2002	Philadelphia	Merriam Theatre
January 17, 2002	Philadelphia	Merriam Theatre
January 18, 2002	Philadelphia	Merriam Theatre
January 19, 2002	Philadelphia	Merriam Theatre
January 20, 2002	Philadelphia	Merriam Theatre
January 22, 2002	New Orleans	Saenger Theatre (DVD Recording)
January 23, 2002	New Orleans	Saenger Theatre (DVD Recording)
January 24, 2002	New Orleans	Saenger Theatre (DVD Recording)
January 25, 2002	New Orleans	Saenger Theatre (DVD Recording)
January 26, 2002	New Orleans	Saenger Theatre (DVD Recording)
January 27, 2002	New Orleans	Saenger Theatre (DVD Recording)
January 29, 2002	Philadelphia	Merriam Theatre
January 30, 2002	Philadelphia	Merriam Theatre
January 31, 2002	Philadelphia	Merriam Theatre
February 1, 2002	Philadelphia	Merriam Theatre
February 2, 2002	Philadelphia	Merriam Theatre
February 3, 2002	Philadelphia	Merriam Theatre
February 5, 2002	Philadelphia	Merriam Theatre
February 6, 2002	Philadelphia	Merriam Theatre
February 7, 2002	Philadelphia	Merriam Theatre
February 8, 2002	Philadelphia	Merriam Theatre
February 9, 2002	Philadelphia	Merriam Theatre
February 10, 2002	Philadelphia	Merriam Theatre
February 14, 2002	Columbia	Township Auditorium
February 15, 2002	Columbia	Township Auditorium
February 16, 2002	Columbia	Township Auditorium
February 17, 2002	Columbia	Township Auditorium
February 20, 2002	Chicago	New Regal Theater
February 21, 2002	Chicago	New Regal Theater
February 22, 2002	Chicago	New Regal Theater
February 23, 2002	Chicago	New Regal Theater
February 24, 2002	Chicago	New Regal Theater
February 26, 2002	New Orleans	Saenger Theatre
February 27, 2002	New Orleans	Saenger Theatre
February 28, 2002	New Orleans	Saenger Theatre
March 1, 2002	New Orleans	Saenger Theatre
March 2, 2002	New Orleans	Saenger Theatre
March 3, 2002	New Orleans	Saenger Theatre
March 5, 2002	Chicago	New Regal Theater
March 6, 2002	Chicago	New Regal Theater
March 7, 2002	Chicago	New Regal Theater
March 8, 2002	Chicago	New Regal Theater
March 9, 2002	Chicago	New Regal Theater
March 10, 2002	Chicago	New Regal Theater
March 12, 2002	Chicago	New Regal Theater
March 13, 2002	Chicago	New Regal Theater
March 14, 2002	Chicago	New Regal Theater
March 15, 2002	Chicago	New Regal Theater
March 16, 2002	Chicago	New Regal Theater
March 17, 2002	Chicago	New Regal Theater
March 27, 2002	Chicago	New Regal Theater
March 28, 2002	Chicago	New Regal Theater
March 29, 2002	Chicago	New Regal Theater
March 30, 2002	Chicago	New Regal Theater
March 31, 2002	Chicago	New Regal Theater
April 2, 2002	Washington, D.C.	Warner Theatre
April 3, 2002	Washington, D.C.	Warner Theatre
April 4, 2002	Washington, D.C.	Warner Theatre
April 5, 2002	Washington, D.C.	Warner Theatre
April 6, 2002	Washington, D.C.	Warner Theatre
April 7, 2002	Washington, D.C.	Warner Theatre
April 9, 2002	Washington, D.C.	Warner Theatre
April 10, 2002	Washington, D.C.	Warner Theatre
April 11, 2002	Washington, D.C.	Warner Theatre
April 12, 2002	Washington, D.C.	Warner Theatre
April 13, 2002	Washington, D.C.	Warner Theatre
April 14, 2002	Washington, D.C.	Warner Theatre
April 16, 2002	Atlanta	Atlanta Civic Center
April 17, 2002	Atlanta	Atlanta Civic Center
April 18, 2002	Atlanta	Atlanta Civic Center
April 19, 2002	Atlanta	Atlanta Civic Center
April 20, 2002	Atlanta	Atlanta Civic Center
April 21, 2002	Atlanta	Atlanta Civic Center
May 7, 2002	New York	Beacon Theatre
May 8, 2002	New York	Beacon Theatre
May 9, 2002	New York	Beacon Theatre
May 10, 2002	New York	Beacon Theatre
May 11, 2002	New York	Beacon Theatre
May 12, 2002	New York	Beacon Theatre
May 13, 2002	Trenton	War Memorial Auditorium
May 14, 2002	Trenton	War Memorial Auditorium
May 16, 2002	Memphis	Orpheum Theatre
May 17, 2002	Memphis	Orpheum Theatre
May 18, 2002	Memphis	Orpheum Theatre
May 19, 2002	Memphis	Orpheum Theatre
May 21, 2002	New York	Beacon Theatre
May 22, 2002	New York	Beacon Theatre
May 23, 2002	New York	Beacon Theatre
May 24, 2002	New York	Beacon Theatre
May 25, 2002	New York	Beacon Theatre
May 26, 2002	New York	Beacon Theatre
July 16, 2002	Washington, D.C.	Warner Theatre
July 17, 2002	Washington, D.C.	Warner Theatre
July 18, 2002	Washington, D.C.	Warner Theatre
July 19, 2002	Washington, D.C.	Warner Theatre
July 20, 2002	Washington, D.C.	Warner Theatre
July 21, 2002	Washington, D.C.	Warner Theatre
September 3, 2002	Philadelphia	Merriam Theater
September 4, 2002	Philadelphia	Merriam Theater
September 5, 2002	Philadelphia	Merriam Theater
September 6, 2002	Philadelphia	Merriam Theater
September 7, 2002	Philadelphia	Merriam Theater
September 8, 2002	Philadelphia	Merriam Theater
September 9, 2002	Columbus	Palace Theatre
September 10, 2002	Columbus	Palace Theatre
September 12, 2002	Columbus	Palace Theatre
September 13, 2002	Washington, D.C.	Warner Theatre
September 14, 2002	Washington, D.C.	Warner Theatre
September 15, 2002	Washington, D.C.	Warner Theatre
September 17, 2002	Detroit	Music Hall Center for the Performing Arts
September 18, 2002	Detroit	Music Hall Center for the Performing Arts
September 19, 2002	Detroit	Music Hall Center for the Performing Arts
September 20, 2002	Detroit	Music Hall Center for the Performing Arts
September 21, 2002	Detroit	Music Hall Center for the Performing Arts
September 22, 2002	Detroit	Music Hall Center for the Performing Arts
September 24, 2002	Detroit	Music Hall Center for the Performing Arts
September 25, 2002	Detroit	Music Hall Center for the Performing Arts
September 26, 2002	Detroit	Music Hall Center for the Performing Arts
September 27, 2002	Detroit	Music Hall Center for the Performing Arts
September 28, 2002	Detroit	Music Hall Center for the Performing Arts
September 29, 2002	Detroit	Music Hall Center for the Performing Arts
October 1, 2002	Detroit	Music Hall Center for the Performing Arts
October 2, 2002	Detroit	Music Hall Center for the Performing Arts
October 3, 2002	Detroit	Music Hall Center for the Performing Arts
October 4, 2002	Detroit	Music Hall Center for the Performing Arts
October 5, 2002	Detroit	Music Hall Center for the Performing Arts
October 6, 2002	Detroit	Music Hall Center for the Performing Arts
October 8, 2002	Detroit	Music Hall Center for the Performing Arts
October 9, 2002	Detroit	Music Hall Center for the Performing Arts
October 10, 2002	Detroit	Music Hall Center for the Performing Arts
October 11, 2002	Detroit	Music Hall Center for the Performing Arts
October 12, 2002	Detroit	Music Hall Center for the Performing Arts
October 13, 2002	Detroit	Music Hall Center for the Performing Arts
October 24, 2002	Indianapolis	Murat Theatre
October 25, 2002	Indianapolis	Murat Theatre
October 26, 2002	Indianapolis	Murat Theatre
October 27, 2002	Indianapolis	Murat Theatre
October 29, 2002	Baltimore	Morgan State University
October 30, 2002	Baltimore	Morgan State University
October 31, 2002	Baltimore	Morgan State University
November 1, 2002	Baltimore	Morgan State University
November 2, 2002	Baltimore	Morgan State University
November 3, 2002	Baltimore	Morgan State University
November 5, 2002	Dallas	Bruton Theatre
November 6, 2002	Dallas	Bruton Theatre
November 7, 2002	Dallas	Bruton Theatre
November 8, 2002	Dallas	Bruton Theatre
November 9, 2002	Dallas	Bruton Theatre
November 10, 2002	Dallas	Bruton Theatre
November 19, 2002	Houston	Verizon Wireless Theatre
November 20, 2002	Houston	Verizon Wireless Theatre
November 21, 2002	Houston	Verizon Wireless Theatre
November 22, 2002	Houston	Verizon Wireless Theatre
November 23, 2002	Houston	Verizon Wireless Theatre
November 24, 2002	Houston	Verizon Wireless Theatre
November 25, 2002	Houston	Verizon Wireless Theatre
November 26, 2002	Houston	Verizon Wireless Theatre
November 28, 2002	New Orleans	Saenger Theatre
November 29, 2002	New Orleans	Saenger Theatre
November 30, 2002	New Orleans	Saenger Theatre
December 1, 2002	New Orleans	Saenger Theatre

Categories
