= Arie Crown Theater =

Entertainment venue in Chicago, Illinois

- Interactive map of Arie Crown Theater
- Address: 2301 S. Jean Baptiste Point DuSable Lake Shore Drive
- Location: Chicago, Illinois
- Coordinates: 41°51′10.24″N 87°36′56.24″W
- Owner: Metropolitan Pier and Exposition Authority
- Operator: Oak View Group
- Capacity: 4,188
- Public transit: Green at Cermak–McCormick Place at McCormick Place

Construction
- Opened: 1960
- Renovated: 1971

Website
- www.ariecrown.com

The Arie Crown Theater is an entertainment venue situated on Lake Shore Drive in the Near South Side area of Chicago. Named after Lithuanian immigrant Arie Crown, who was the father of industrialist and philanthropist Henry Crown, it opened in 1960 with seating for 5,000 people, one of the largest seating capacities in Chicago. The theater is part of the McCormick Place convention facility, owned by the Metropolitan Pier and Exposition Authority.

The theatre was damaged by a fire in 1967 and was closed until 1971. After re-opening in January for Mahalia Jackson's funeral, the Arie Crown has, for more than five decades, presented classical, R&B, and rock music, along with musicals and plays.

Notable performers at the Arie Crown have included iconic stars such as Frank Sinatra, Judy Garland, Barbra Streisand, Ella Fitzgerald, Lena Horne, The Rolling Stones, Genesis, The Beach Boys, Simon & Garfunkel, Ray Charles, Aretha Franklin, Richard Pryor, Tina Turner, Liberace, Sammy Davis Jr., Whitney Houston, Liza Minnelli, James Brown, Sonny & Cher, Patti LaBelle, Anita Baker, The Temptations, Tyler Perry, Gladys Knight, Diana Ross, Mary J. Blige, David Bowie, Chicago, and Katt Williams, among others.

In more recent years, the acoustics have been improved by changing the proportions of the auditorium and staging area, and this has reduced the seating capacity to 4,188 people.
