= Music Hall Center for the Performing Arts =

Theatre in Detroit, Michigan

- Wilson Theatre, Detroit Music Hall
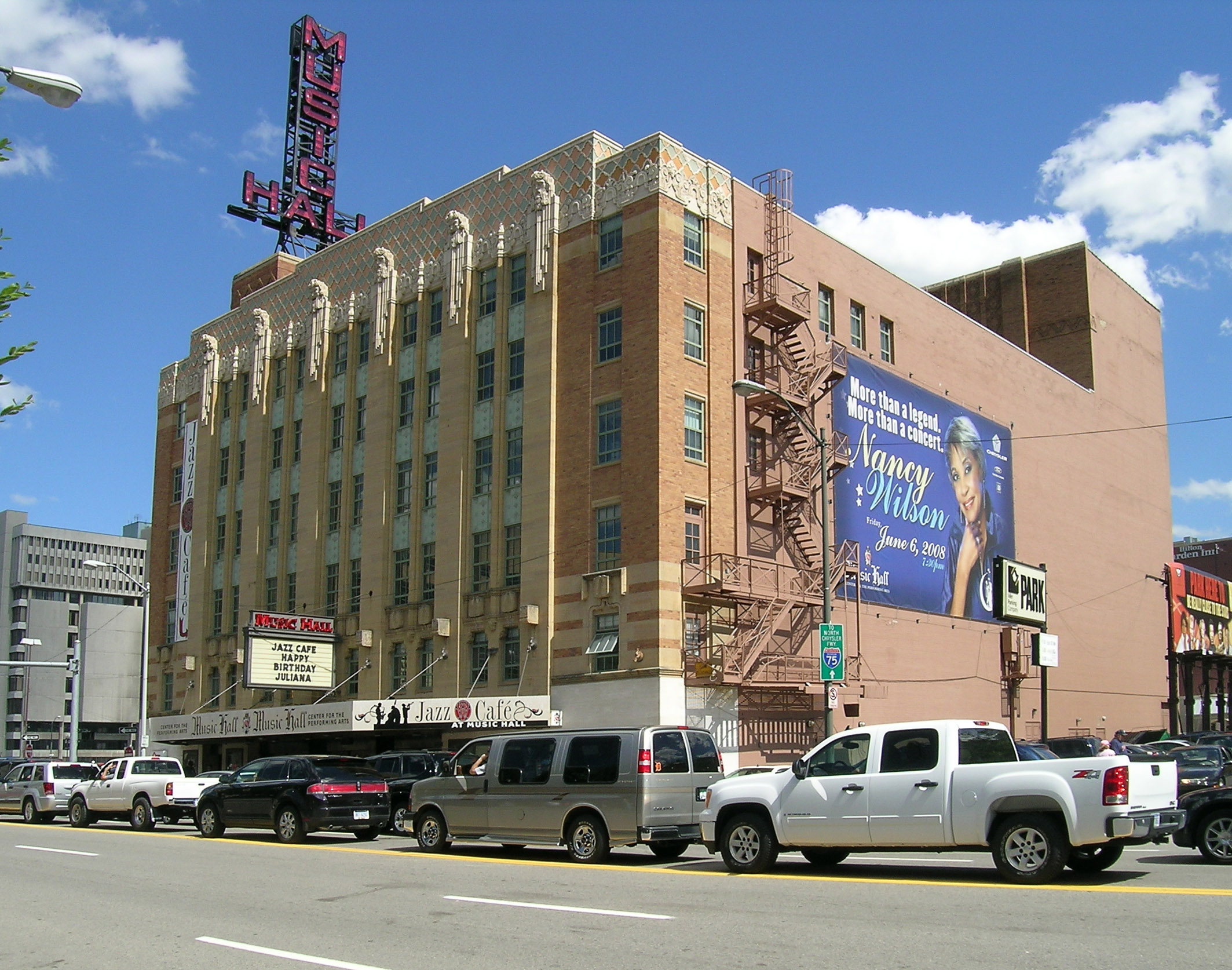
- Interactive map of Music Hall Center for the Performing Arts
- Address: 350 Madison Street; Detroit, Michigan; United States
- Capacity: 1,731
- Current use: Performing arts center

Construction
- Opened: 1928

Website
- www.musichall.org
- Wilson Theatre
- U.S. National Register of Historic Places
- Michigan State Historic Site
- Coordinates: 42°20′14″N 83°2′46″W
- Architect: William Kapp; Smith, Hinchman & Grylls
- NRHP reference No.: 77000725

Significant dates
- Added to NRHP: August 9, 1977
- Designated MSHS: August 6, 1976

The Music Hall Center for the Performing Arts is a 1,731-seat theatre located in the city's theatre district at 350 Madison Street in Downtown Detroit, Michigan. It was built in 1928 as the Wilson Theatre, designated a Michigan State Historic Site in 1976, and was listed on the National Register of Historic Places in 1977.

== History ==
John Francis Dodge and his brother Horace were original investors in Ford Motor Company who sold their interest to Henry Ford and established their own company, the Dodge Motor Company, in 1914. Both brothers died in 1920, leaving their respective widows very wealthy women.

Matilda Dodge Wilson, John's widow, married in 1925 to Alfred Wilson, was interested in stage productions and decided to use part of her fortune to build a venue in Detroit to serve as home to a repertory troupe and to host touring Broadway performers. She hired the prominent Detroit architectural firm of Smith, Hinchman & Grylls, who assigned William Kapp to design the building, and spent $1.5 million on the construction. At the time of its opening in 1928, the building was dubbed the Wilson Theatre.

== Building ==
Kapp designed the six-story Wilson Theater in an Art Deco style. The Madison Street facade is decorated with orange and tan brick with Pewabic tile and stone accents. The upper facade is divided into seven bays by stone-covered piers, which are capped with terra cotta theatrical masks. In each of the five central bays are two windows separated by a narrower pier. The end bays have only one window. The parapet boasts coral and green Pewabic tile in a quatrefoil pattern and the facade at street level has been covered with travertine with green marble at the base.

The original interior was designed in a Spanish Renaissance style and seated 1,800. The lower-level lounge featured a built-in bar among its amenities.

== Later history ==
During the Great Depression, the cash-strapped Detroit Symphony Orchestra was unable to maintain its own building, Orchestra Hall, and played in several other locations in the city. In 1946, the orchestra moved into the Wilson Theatre, renaming it Detroit Music Hall. The symphony left for the newly constructed Ford Auditorium in 1956, and the building was used for other purposes, especially a movie theater showing Cinerama films.

In 1971, Music Hall became home of the fledgling Michigan Opera Theatre. The opera company staged most of its productions here through the 1984 season.

Restoration efforts began in 1973 and continued for several years. In 1974, the venue was renamed the Music Hall Center for the Performing Arts. It is the only remaining venue in Detroit constructed to present live performances.

The theater was added to the Michigan Register of Historic Places in 1976 and the National Register of Historic Places in 1977. A State of Michigan historical marker was placed at the entrance in 1978.

== Expansion ==
In October 2023, the board of trustees announced plans for a 108,000 square feet (10,000 m^{2}) expansion on vacant land west of the original facilit which has been used for parking. The expansion would spread over seven floors and house a 1,920 seat concert hall, a music academy, recording studio, office space and a restaurant among features.
