= List of Meet the Browns episodes =

This is a list of episodes for Tyler Perry's sitcom Meet the Browns on TBS. The series premiered on January 7, 2009 and concluded on November 18, 2011. A total of 5 seasons and 140 episodes were produced, with each episode's name beginning with "meet" or "meet the".

== Series overview ==
Season	Episodes	Originally released	
Season	Episodes	First released	Last released
1	10	January 7, 2009	February 4, 2009
2	26	May 27, 2009	September 16, 2009
3	42	November 4, 2009	June 9, 2010
4	54	June 16, 2010	December 22, 2010
5	8	October 28, 2011	November 18, 2011

== Episodes ==
=== Season 1 (2009) ===
No. overall	No. in season	Title	Directed by	Written by	Original release date	Prod. code
1	1	"Meet Brown Meadows"	David A. Arnold	Story by: David A. Arnold, Teleplay by: Wendell Hanes	January 7, 2009	101
Mr. Leroy S. Brown attempts to open a retirement home for his late father's wishes, but is halted by the inspector and the head manager of the retirement home across the street. A former movie actress named Daisy LaRue stays at Brown Meadows.
2	2	"Meet London and the Competition"	David A. Arnold	Story by: David A. Arnold, Teleplay by: Wendell Hanes	January 7, 2009	102
Mr. Brown ends up in jail after a misunderstanding of a bomb at an airport. From his jail cell, Mr. Brown hires a new handyman named Jesus Hernandez and welcomes a troubled rich girl named London Sheraton.
3	3	"Meet the Dependents and the Divas"	Tyler Perry	Story by: Tyler Perry, Teleplay by: Christopher J. Moore & Calvin Brown Jr.	January 14, 2009	103
When two troubled foster kids arrive at the Brown home, Sasha and Will consider being their foster parents. Meanwhile, diva duo London Sheraton and Miss Daisy take part in a battle of wits when they appear on a local TV show. Debuts Brianne Gould as Brianna Ortiz and Gunnar Washington as Joaquin Ortiz
4	4	"Meet Your Family"	Tyler Perry	Story by: Tyler Perry, Teleplay by: Joseph Hampton & Carlos Portugal	January 14, 2009	104
Chaotic actions in the house prompt Brown to organize a surprise "family day" for the residents, but the sole family arrival is the Colonel's estranged daughter.
5	5	"Meet Your Maker"	Tyler Perry	Story by: Tyler Perry, Teleplay by: Shontell McClain	January 21, 2009	105
The gang stages a retrospective of Miss Edna's life when she becomes despondent; Brown questions Jesus' sexual orientation after overhearing about him being "in the closet".
6	6	"Meet the Babies"	Tyler Perry	Story by: Tyler Perry, Teleplay by: Calvin Brown, Jr. & Christopher J. Moore	January 21, 2009	106
When Brianna's pregnant-teen friend goes into labor, Brown must deliver the baby alone; Miss Daisy vanishes and ends up participating in a rap music video. Absent: Arielle Vandenberg
7	7	"Meet the Dangerous & the Deadline"	Tyler Perry	Story by: Tyler Perry, Teleplay by: Anita M. Cal	January 28, 2009	107
Sasha’s past comes back to haunt her when an old abusive boyfriend, Teddy, is released from prison and comes to see her. When she rejects him, he abducts her. But Teddy underestimates Cora--she's Madea’s daughter, after all. Meanwhile, London loses Brown’s winning raffle ticket for a Couples' Cruise to the Bahamas, leaving him until midnight to find it. Brown enlists everyone to help him find the ticket. Each resident woos Brown in hopes to be chosen to go on the cruise with him. Special Guest Star: Gary Sturgis as Teddy Absent: Juanita Jennings, Brianne Gould, and Gunnar Washington
8	8	"Meet the Faithless and the Faithful"	Tyler Perry	Story by: Tyler Perry, Teleplay by: Calvin Brown Jr. & Christopher J. Moore	January 28, 2009	108
Brown enters a Gospel Choir contest which he’s lost 6 straight years to the flamboyant Deacon C. Cecil Cleveland of the Greater Mount Mariah Missionary Built on a Rock Baptist Church. This year, Brown thinks he has a secret weapon: the legendary Mother Martha Lane. But the 93-year-old Mother Lane “goes home” before the competition. Yes, that “home”. Meanwhile: Cora’s childhood friend Tina, a preacher's wife, visits. She's frustrated with her marriage and decides to find her wild side. Cora tries to rein her in and help her save her marriage.
9	9	"Meet the Truth"	Tyler Perry	Story by: Tyler Perry, Teleplay by: Joseph Hampton & Carlos Portugal	February 4, 2009	109
Brianna has been acting out at school and is suspended for threatening some kids who were bullying Joaquin. Sasha, Will, and Carmen try to find out what is bothering her. Will and Carmen aren’t successful, but Sasha finally uncovers Brianna’s secret: she was sexually abused by her mother’s boyfriend. Meanwhile, 2 geeky frat boys from the house next door (they couldn't get into a real frat house) steal Pop Brown's portrait from Brown Meadows as a prank. Their faculty advisor, Russell Merriweather, makes the boys work for Brown to make up for their prank, and everyone in the house runs them ragged. Also: Russell asks Cora out, but the date backfires when Edna and London convince Cora to dress too sexily--Russell liked the real, down-to-earth Cora just fine. They agree to try again.
10	10	"Meet the Future"	Tyler Perry	Story by: Tyler Perry, Teleplay by: Christopher J. Moore & Kellie Griffin	February 4, 2009	110
Cora and Russell have gone on several more dates and she's smitten with him. London, Daisy and Edna spy on Cora and Russell whenever he comes over. Brown becomes afraid that Cora will fall in love with Russell and move away, leaving him alone. Brown interrogates Russell, scaring him away. Will and Sasha are caught off-guard when Carmen Martinez announces that a former foster family of Brianna and Joaquin’s has decided to adopt them. Sasha and Will are shocked; they have grown close to the kids. At first the kids are excited about moving to a fancy new house, having their own rooms, etc., but they realize how close they have grown to Will, Sasha, Brown, Cora, and the residents, and they don't want to leave. As the episode ends with Carmen taking them to their new family, Will tells Sasha that they will try to get them back. Note: This episode is Brianne Gould's final appearance as Brianna Ortiz.

=== Season 2 (2009) ===
No. overall	No. in season	Title	Directed by	Written by	Original release date	Prod. code
11	1	"Meet The Parents and The Plant"	Tyler Perry	Joseph Hampton & Christopher J. Moore	May 27, 2009	201
Will and Sasha try to find a way to get Brianna and Joaquin back before the Turners adopt them. Brown and the Colonel hatch a plot of their own to get the kids back, once and for all. Brown also thinks the frat boys next door are growing marijuana and leaps into action. Note: Logan Browning joins the main cast as Brianna, replacing Brianne Gould. Brown references this when he says he remembers Joaquin but asks who the "new girl" is. When Sasha tells him its Brianna, he looks at the audience and says "Somebody lyin'". Absent: Arielle Vandenberg, Katherine Callan, Antonio Jaramillo and Juanita Jennings
12	2	"Meet The Profits"	Tyler Perry	Robin M. Henry	May 27, 2009	202
Brown starts charging the residents (and Cora) for amenities around the house, and it soon gets way out of hand: pay toilet, vending machine in the kitchen, parking meters, etc. The residents plot their revenge on Brown. Meanwhile, Will feels threatened when Sasha is offered a job that pays more than he makes. Absent: Antonio Jaramillo, Katherine Callan, Logan Browning, Gunnar Washington, and Arielle Vandenberg
13	3	"Meet The Class"	Tyler Perry	Rodney Barnes	June 3, 2009	203
Cora gets a substitute-teaching job, but instead of "little angels," she's assigned some of the school's toughest students including a tough girl named Angie. Meanwhile, Brown and London compete in a "fashion showdown" for a NY designer. Absent: Antonio Jaramillo, Gunnar Washington, and Logan Browning
14	4	"Meet Mommie Dearest"	Tyler Perry	Kellie Griffin	June 3, 2009	204
Tanya Ortiz. Brianna and Joaquin's mother, returns from jail. When she finds out that Will and Sasha are planning to adopt the kids, she determines to get them back just so she can live off their welfare checks. Meanwhile, Brown is "up all night": he has accidentally taken a handful of those "little blue pills" that the Colonel has started taking to improve his romantic life. Absent: Katherine Callan, Arielle Vandenberg, Antonio Jaramillo, and Tamela Mann
15	5	"Meet the Matchmaker"	Tyler Perry	Kelly Zimmerman-Green	June 10, 2009	205
Will and Sasha are determined to fight Tanya to keep her from taking "her" kids. Meanwhile, Jesus asks Mr. Brown's help on how to be romantic to London. Absent: Katherine Callan, Juanita Jennings and Tony Vaughn
16	6	"Meet Career Day"	Tyler Perry	Anthony C. Hill	June 10, 2009	206
Will convinces Brianna to let him come to her school's Career Day, since her biological father is in prison. She agrees, but there's an emergency at the hospital. Brianna is disappointed and Brown tries to fill in, but embarrass Brianna. Meanwhile, Cora decides to dress and act like a young teenage girl after Mr.Brown embarrass her by trying to get front row seats to a circus where children get in for free, yet she's an adult but treated like a young kid. Absent: Arielle Vandenberg, Katherine Callan, Juanita Jennings, Tony Vaughn, Antonio Jaramillo, and Gunnar Washington (even though Joaquin was mentioned)
17	7	"Meet the Cousins"	Leonard R. Garner, Jr.	Carlos Portugal	June 17, 2009	207
Will has a lot of explaining to do when Sasha discovers photos on his cell phone from a bachelor party. Meanwhile, Mr. Brown searches his family tree and finds out that Miss Daisy’s ancestors owned his. Absent: Katherine Callan, Antonio Jaramillo, Tony Vaughn, Gunnar Washington, and Logan Browning
18	8	"Meet the Body"	Chip Hurd	Vanessa Middleton	June 17, 2009	208
Brown gives Edna an ultimatum: no more men. But one can't leave...he died in her room. She tries to get rid of the body before Brown finds out. Meanwhile, Brianna rejects Sasha's mothering efforts when Sasha buys her a fancy dress for the upcoming legacy ball. Absent: Arielle Vandenberg, Katherine Callan, Gunnar Washington, and Lamman Rucker
19	9	"Meet the Mexican"	Tyler Perry	Carlos Portugal	June 24, 2009	209
Jesus lies to his father Francisco who is about to visit, telling him that he is a successful lawyer who owns a house and servants. Meanwhile, London is expecting a visit from her wealthy father, and is heartbroken when he doesn't show up. Special Guest Star: Erik Estrada as Francisco Hernandez Absent: Tony Vaughn (but is mentioned by Jesus), Lamman Rucker, Denise Boutte, Katherine Callan, Gunnar Washington, and Logan Browning
20	10	"Meet the Entrepreneur"	Kim Fields	Bentley Kyle Evans	June 24, 2009	210
Will gets very cold feet about being a father to Brianna and Joaquin. He vents to Brown about his doubts, but Brianna overhears him. She and Joaquin, thinking they are not wanted, run away. Everyone convinces Brown to market the secret family barbecue sauce recipe and he gets excited about getting rich, but he loses the recipe and scrambles to recreate it. Absent: Arielle Vandenberg and Antonio Jaramillo
21	11	"Meet the Ex"	Chip Hurd	Myra J.	July 1, 2009	211
Will's gorgeous, free-spirited, socialite ex-girlfriend Lynn shows up as a donor for a charity benefit that he is chairing. Sasha is jealous of her until she realizes who she's really attracted to Sasha. Edna is considering plastic surgery, so London convinces her and the ladies to throw a "Botox Party". Absent: Antonio Jaramillo, Gunnar Washington, Logan Browning, and Tony Vaughn
22	12	"Meet the E.R."	Chip Hurd	David Wyatt	July 1, 2009	212
Brown is shot in the butt during a robbery at a convenience store, hurting his pride more than his bottom. But he milks the situation and has the residents wait on him hand and foot, until they rebel. Edna has a health scare and decides to change her sensual ways. Absent: Katherine Callan, Arielle Vandenberg, Antonio Jaramillo, Gunnar Washington, and Logan Browning
23	13	"Meet the Secret"	Tyler Perry	Carlos Portugal	July 8, 2009	213
Joaquin's Little League coach turns out to be a pedophile. When Cora tries to convince Brown to make a will, he thinks she's out to kill him. Note-This episode and a couple others had the child abuse number before the credits. Absent: Katherine Callan, Arielle Vandenberg, Antonio Jaramillo, and Logan Browning
24	14	"Meet the Intervention"	Kim Fields	Anthony C. Hill	July 8, 2009	214
Brown gets hooked on the lotto and the family and residents plan an intervention. Brianna freaks out when classmate Jamal makes an innocent pass at her. Absent: Katherine Callan and Arielle Vandenberg
25	15	"Meet the New Job"	Chip Fields	Joseph Hampton	August 12, 2009	215
Principal Hughes gives Cora a full-time teaching job and she's immediately challenged when troublesome Angie shows up to class drunk. The Colonel discovers he's lost his nest egg and tries to get a job. Absent: Katherine Callan, Arielle Vandenberg, Lamman Rucker, Logan Browning, Antonio Jaramillo, Juanita Jennings (mentioned on the phone by Colonel and Brown), and Gunnar Washington (mentioned by Sasha).
26	16	"Meet the Gold Digger"	Chip Hurd	Stacey Evans Morgan	August 12, 2009	216
Brown meets a supportive soul-mate named Shirley, but she may be after more than just his heart. Brianna gets arrested for shoplifting at the mall after being charged with stealing a pair of $1200 designer shoes. Special Guest Star: Jo Marie Payton as Shirley Absent: Arielle Vandenberg, Antonio Jaramillo, Katherine Callan, Tony Vaughn
27	17	"Meet the Cougars"	Roger M. Bobb	Carlos Portugal	August 19, 2009	217
Brianna's young beau falls for Sasha. Meanwhile, when Edna's theater date falls ill, his nephew fills in. Absent: Arielle Vandenberg, Tony Vaughn, Katherine Callan, and Gunnar Washington
28	18	"Meet the Thief"	Roger M. Bobb	Kelly Zimmerman-Green	August 19, 2009	218
A local burglary prompts the Colonel, Will, and Jesus to launch a neighborhood-watch group. Elsewhere, Brown treats a sick Cora, with nauseating results. Absent: Katherine Callan, Arielle Vandenberg, Juanita Jennings, Gunnar Washington, and Denise Boutte
29	19	"Meet the Sweet Tooth"	Mark E. Swinton	Anthony C. Hill	August 26, 2009	219
Sasha helps Cora lose weight; Brown convinces residents to sell chocolate candy bars to try to win a vacation to Mexico. Absent: Lamman Rucker, Antonio Jaramillo, Gunnar Washington, and Logan Browning
30	20	"Meet the Matrimony"	Roger M. Bobb	Steve Coulter	August 26, 2009	220
Edna returns home with news that she's engaged with a man named Charlie but later finds out he has a girlfriend as well right before they were going to get married; Will agrees to appear on a nude calendar at the hospital for charity. Absent: Antonio Jaramillo, Katherine Callan, Gunnar Washington, and Logan Browning
31	21	"Meet the Man and the Mouse"	Kim Fields	Joseph Hampton	September 2, 2009	221
Fed up with their lack of privacy, Will and Sasha decide to move out of Brown Meadows. Brown and the Colonel go to war against a mouse in the house. Absent: Arielle Vandenberg, Antonio Jaramillo, Katherine Callan, Logan Browning, and Gunnar Washington (Joaquin and Brianna were mentioned by Will, Sasha, and Mr. Brown)
32	22	"Meet the Real Dad"	Tyler Perry	Carlos Portugal	September 2, 2009	222
Brianna and Joaquin's dad Hector Ortiz gets out of prison and shows up at the house. Brianna must face who her father really is, not who she's imagined him to be all these years. The Colonel reveals to Brown that he has fallen for Edna, and with Brown's help the Colonel makes his move. Absent: Arielle Vandenberg, Antonio Jaramillo, and Katherine Callan
33	23	"Meet the Hubby"	Kim Fields	Myra J.	September 9, 2009	223
When her friend arrives, Edna asks Brown to pose as her husband. Elsewhere, London and Brianna secretly attend an E30 concert together, which causes tension between London and Sasha. Absent: Tony Vaughn, Gunnar Washington, Lamman Rucker, Katherine Callan, and Antonio Jaramillo
34	24	"Meet the H.B.I.C"	Mark E. Swinton	Myra J.	September 9, 2009	224
Cora and Sasha have a domestic power struggle when they clash over who rules the household. Elsewhere, Brown Meadows has a safety check when Brown runs an emergency-preparedness fire drill. Absent: Tony Vaughn, Lamman Rucker, Juanita Jennings, and Katherine Callan (although she was mentioned)
35	25	"Meet the Troublemaker"	Roger M. Bobb	Rodney Barnes	September 16, 2009	225
A student named Jeffrey who is being bullied brings a gun to Cora's classroom. London is saddened when she realizes her probation is almost over and she'll be leaving Brown Meadows. Note: This is London's final appearance as a main character. Absent: Antonio Jaramillo, Logan Browning, and Gunnar Washington (though they were mentioned by London and Sasha)
36	26	"Meet the Naked Truth"	Kim Fields	Kelly Zimmerman-Green	September 16, 2009	226
An overwhelmed Sasha has a night out and comes home very drunk to Brianna and Joaquin's shock. Brown and the Colonel attend an art class but ends up a disaster when the two becomes the models. Absent: Antonio Jaramillo, Juanita Jennings, and Tamela Mann (though she was mentioned by Brianna)

=== Season 3 (2009–10) ===
No. overall	No. in season	Title	Directed by	Written by	Original release date	Prod. code
37	1	"Meet the Two Left Feet"	Chip Fields	Yolie Cortez	November 4, 2009	301
Will takes secret Salsa-dancing lessons so he can take Sasha to a party, but Sasha thinks he's cheating on her. The Colonel and Edna decide to move in together, down the street from Brown Meadows. Absent: Katherine Callan, Logan Browning, and Gunnar Washington (though Joaquin and Brianna were mentioned by Sasha and Will)
38	2	"Meet the Lessons"	Chip Fields	Carlos Portugal	November 4, 2009	302
The family finds out that Brianna is taking birth-control pills. Meanwhile Cora is attracted to her school's new principal, Gordon, who was her old high-school friend, and decides to spend time with him and gets more than she bargained for in a spin class. Absent: Gunnar Washington, Katherine Callan, and Antonio Jaramillo
39	3	"Meet the Disorderly"	Kim Fields	Robin M. Henry	November 11, 2009	303
Brianna and her friend Simone sneak out to a frat party but turns into a disaster after Derek catches Brianna and Simone is beaten up and almost raped but Brianna wants to keep it a secret to save herself. Meanwhile, Brown decides to fire Jesus to save money and takes him to get a job at a local hospital but Brown steals Jesus' new position. Note: This is Jesus's final appearance as a main cast member
40	4	"Meet the Mom"	Kim Fields	Anthony C. Hill	November 11, 2009	304
When Will gets sick, his mother Vera shows up and clashes with Sasha about his care. Meanwhile, Daisy disappears and Brown, Cora, Edna, and the Colonel realize that her mental condition is deteriorating. Absent: Logan Browning and Gunnar Washington (but both were mentioned by Sasha and Vera)
41	5	"Meet the Great Guy"	Kim Fields	Kelly Zimmerman-Green	November 18, 2009	305
When Eddie, Joaquin's old baseball coach and almost-molester, dies on Will's operating table, Will is accused of having a hand in his death. Meanwhile, Reggie asks Cora out and Brown instantly dislikes him. Absent: Katherine Callan, Juanita Jennings, Tony Vaughn, and Logan Browning (but she was mentioned by Will)
42	6	"Meet the Saboteurs"	Chip Hurd	Joseph Hampton	November 18, 2009	306
Will is upset when he learns that Sasha doubts his innocence over Eddie's death. Meanwhile Cora uses reverse psychology to get Brown to like Reggie. Absent: Juanita Jennings, Tony Vaughn, Gunnar Washington, and Logan Browning
43	7	"Meet The Couch Potato"	Chip Hurd	Vanessa Middleton	November 25, 2009	307
Will deals with his suspension by spending his days sleeping and not paying attention to the kids. Meanwhile, Brown learns a few phrases of Spanish to get a raise at the hospital; then an accident victim arrives and he's unable to translate. Absebt: Juanita Jennings (but she was mentioned by Sasha and Will), Tony Vaughn, and Tamela Mann (but she was mentioned by Joaquin)
44	8	"Meet Mr. Wrong"	Chip Hurd	Carlos Portugal	December 2, 2009	308
Daisy's deteriorating memory prompts Brown to contact Daisy's long-lost cousin Lorraine. Meanwhile, Sasha helps Cora teach Reggie a lesson when he reveals his old-fashioned attitude about gender roles. Note: This is Ms. Daisy's final appearance as one of the main characters. Special Guest Star: Rue McClanahan as Lorraine Absent: Lamman Rucker (but he was mentioned by Sasha and Cora), Gunnar Washington, and Logan Browning
45	9	"Meet The Christmas Spirit"	Kim Fields	Anthony C. Hill	December 9, 2009	309
Brown and Curtis Panye (from Tyler Perry's House of Payne) battle over who gets to play Santa as they put on a Christmas play for the children at the hospital. Meanwhile, Joaquin's new friend is actually an angel. Special Guest Stars: LaVan Davis as Curtis Payne and Cassi Davis as Ella Payne Absent: Tony Vaughn and Juanita Jennings
46	10	"Meet Mom Again"	Kim Fields	Myra J.	December 16, 2009	310
Will's mother visits again and creates more problems between Will and Sasha as a result. Meanwhile, Brown helps Brianna and her friend Jamal with a school assignment that puts them in parenthood roles. Absent: Juanita Jennings, Tony Vaughn, and Gunnar Washington
47	11	"Meet the Lovers"	Kim Fields	Joseph Hampton	December 16, 2009	311
Will's mentor Troy, an attractive doctor, kisses Sasha and keeps her quiet about it by threatening Will's job. Meanwhile, Brown busts up a fake hall-pass scheme when he gets hired as the security guard at the school. Absent: Juanita Jennings, Tony Vaughn and Gunnar Washington
48	12	"Meet the Tension"	Chip Fields	Anthony C. Hill	December 23, 2009	312
Brown is determined to reunite Edna and the Colonel for purely selfish reasons. Meanwhile, Will is reinstated. Absent: Logan Browning and Gunnar Washington
49	13	"Meet the Liar"	Chip Hurd	Joseph Hampton	December 30, 2009	313
Tanya seeks Cora's help so she can be a better mother to Brianna and Joaquin; Brown has a quarantine quandary when he gets stuck in detainment at the hospital with Derek, Renee, and a pregnant woman who's in labor.
50	14	"Meet the Adoption"	Kim Fields	Dani Renee	December 30, 2009	314
Tanya wins custody of Brianna and Joaquin, but she may be in over her head. And Brown must face the music when he breaks Edna's record player.
51	15	"Meet the Wills"	Kim Fields	Myra J.	January 6, 2010	315
Will reacts badly to Sasha's mammogram results: she has a lump. He becomes more of a doctor than the husband she needs. Meanwhile, London's father cuts off her cash and credit cards; she has to learn about "being poor" and it's not pretty.
52	16	"Meet the Consequences"	Kim Fields	Joseph Hampton	January 6, 2010	316
Will finds out about Troy kissing Sasha and throws her out. Meanwhile, Joaquin finds out Brianna is sneaking out and blackmails her.
53	17	"Meet the Bully"	Roger M. Bobb	Christopher J. Moore & Calvin Brown Jr.	January 6, 2010	317
Joaquin's bully problem quickly becomes Brown's when the bully's father gets involved. Special Guest Star: Rashad Evans
54	18	"Meet Your Match"	Chip Hurd	Steve Coulter	January 6, 2010	318
Feeling guilty about chasing off Russell, Brown secretly sets Cora up on a date through an online dating website. Elsewhere, Jesus and London try to help Miss Daisy with her audition.
55	19	"Meet the Church Board"	Kim Fields	Anthony C. Hill	January 13, 2010	319
Will and Sasha try to work out their problems, but Will isn't ready. Meanwhile, Cora and Brown compete for a church-board position. Note: From this episode and on, Meet The Browns is recorded using Filmlook.
56	20	"Meet the Test"	Chip Hurd	Anthony C. Hill	January 13, 2010	320
Will and Tanya take care of the kids. Meanwhile, Brown and Derek take a defensive-driving course.
57	21	"Meet the Protest"	Roger M. Bobb	Myra J.	January 13, 2010	321
Tanya makes a move on Will. Meanwhile, Brown is called in to settle a sit-in at the school.
58	22	"Meet the Bump and Grind"	Roger M. Bobb	Vanessa Middleton	January 13, 2010	322
Will and Sasha think that Brianna is pregnant after finding a pregnancy test in the trash can and later finds out it's Brianna's friend, Simone, who's pregnant. Meanwhile, Brown throws the Colonel a bachelor party while Cora and Edna are out of town but later finds out that the entertainer that Derek hired is a stripper which Brown throws a big fit.
59	23	"Meet the Fake ID"	Kim Fields	Vanessa Middleton	January 20, 2010	323
Derek catches Brianna with a fake I.D. and Brianna lies about her age and dates an older guy that she met at the nightclub. Brown and Will become househusbands after Cora and Sasha had enough of them making them do errands, cooking, and cleaning.
60	24	"Meet the Other Man"	Kim Fields	Yolanda Lawrence	January 20, 2010	324
Sasha's mom visits with another man and Brown helps Reggie coach football.
61	25	"Meet the Double Date"	Chip Fields	Myra J.	January 20, 2010	325
Cora and Reggie set up Brown and Reggie's mother, Thelma, for a "play date". Meanwhile, Sasha shares bedroom secrets with Renee.
62	26	"Meet the Alter Ego"	Kim Fields	David A. Arnold	January 20, 2010	326
Brown hits his head and becomes Bougie. Meanwhile, Brianna's bikini pictures end up online.
63	27	"Meet the Anniversary"	Kim Fields	Myra J.	January 27, 2010	327
Vera sleeps with Sasha's father, and Reggie wants Cora to stop being friends with Gordon. Special Guest Star: Richard Roundtree as Frank
64	28	"Meet My Fair Tanya"	Kim Fields	David A. Arnold	January 27, 2010	328
Tanya gets help from Sasha and Cora on becoming a lady after meeting a new nan. Meanwhile The Colonel is depressed when he finds out he is the last living member of his platoon. Brown, the Colonel, and Edna attend the funeral but ends up in a big disaster.
65	29	"Meet the Stand-Up"	Kim Fields	Anthony C. Hill	January 27, 2010	329
Brown becomes a stand-up comedian, and uses the family's problems for jokes. The family finds out that Joaquin's IQ is higher than everyone else's.
66	30	"Meet the Counseling Session"	Kim Fields	Vanessa Middleton & Anthony C. Hill	January 27, 2010	330
After a fight, the Colonel counsels Cora and Brown. Sasha and Will decide to take a 30-day challenge that involves them cutting out physical intimacy.
67	31	"Meet the Mugger"	Kim Fields	Stacey Evans Morgan	February 3, 2010	331
Cora gets mugged and becomes overprotective and paranoid. Will finds a gray hair and begins acting young.
68	32	"Meet the Stakeout"	Kim Fields	Carlos Portugal	February 3, 2010	332
Brown's new neighbors may be thieves. Brown welcomes the police use his house for a stakeout but turns out the police are the real thieves and ties up Brown, Cora, and Derek to rob the house. Brianna comes to help Sasha at the hospital and befriends Renee.
69	33	"Meet the Cheating Liver"	Kim Fields	Joseph Hampton	February 10, 2010	333
Cora suspects Reggie is cheating on her. Thelma and Brown get involved. Renee loses a liver that is in a transplant cooler. Note: Tamela Mann(Cora) sings a song from her sophomore album: "Tamela Mann: The Master Plan." called "The Master Plan".
70	34	"Meet the Loot"	Kim Fields	David A. Arnold	February 10, 2010	334
Brown and Cora loan the Colonel a dollar which he uses to buy a lottery ticket. The ticket hits and everyone fights over splitting the winnings. When Sasha and Renee switch jobs, Sasha can't handle Renee's job, and Renee excels at Sasha's.
71	35	"Meet the Bucket List"	Chip Hurd	Vanessa Middleton	February 17, 2010	335
Brown and Colonel make a list of the things they want to do before they die including getting Jheri curl wigs and riding a motorcycle but ends up in a comedic accident.After Joaquin walks in on Will and Sasha having sex, they think they have to give him "the talk."
72	36	"Meet the Racist"	Chip Fields	Myra J.	February 17, 2010	336
An elderly black patient refuses to be operated on by Will because he's black. Meanwhile, Brown finds out that Cora never went to the prom. So he, Joaquin, Reggie, and Brianna create one in the living room.
73	37	"Meet the Stepdaughter"	Kim Fields	LaKeisha Fielding	February 24, 2010	337
The Colonel's daughter Karen wants Edna to sign a prenup. Meanwhile, Brown has diabetes so Cora tries to get him to eat healthy and Derek takes him to the hospital for an exercise class.
74	38	"Meet the Baby"	Chip Hurd	David A. Arnold	February 24, 2010	338
Vera recovers from laser eye surgery at Brown Meadows. Sasha faints while working out at home and later finds out she's pregnant and she and Will try to keep it a secret.
75	39	"Meet the Scholarship"	Chip Hurd	Joseph Hampton	June 2, 2010	339
Derek loses his scholarship and must work at the house to earn money and he takes advantage. Joaquin likes a girl at school and thugs out when Brianna tells him girls like bad boys.
76	40	"Meet the Boyfriend"	Chip Hurd	Chrystal A. Ellzy	June 2, 2010	340
Brianna falls in love for the first time with an old friend from foster care named Antonio but Will disapproves due to his appearance and catches him and Brianna kissing. Meanwhile, Cora has to teach sex education.
77	41	"Meet the Secret Admirer"	Kim Fields	Carlos Portugal	June 9, 2010	341
Gordon has feelings for Cora; Derek and his fraternity brothers invade the Browns' home.
78	42	"Meet the Job Offer"	Kim Fields	Myra J.	June 9, 2010	342
Cora gets a job offer in a new city; Joaquin records things with his new camera.

=== Season 4 (2010) ===
No. overall	No. in season	Title	Directed by	Written by	Original release date	Prod. code
79	1	"Meet the Big Wedding"	Kim Fields	Anthony C. Hill	June 16, 2010	401
The Colonel suffers a heart attack at the altar. Reggie asks a reluctant Cora to marry him. Note: Katherine Callan (Miss Daisy), Antonio Jaramillo (Jesus) and Arielle Vandenberg (London) will no longer appear in the series.
80	2	"Meet the Postponement"	Chip Hurd	Brian Egeston	June 16, 2010	402
The Colonel decides to postpone the wedding after his near-death experience. Meanwhile, Cora decides to take the job in Texas and postpones her and Reggie's engagement.
81	3	"Meet the Super Christian"	Chip Hurd	Brian Egeston	June 30, 2010	403
The Colonel takes his heart attack as a sign, becomes a super Christian, and moves in with Brown. Meanwhile, after a misunderstanding, Brown suspects Cora is pregnant.
82	4	"Meet the Farewell"	Kim Fields	Brian Egeston	June 30, 2010	404
As Cora's class plans for a farewell party, Cora hears some disturbing news from Gordon that he set up the job offer, and she stays in Atlanta. Meanwhile the Colonel is considering moving back in with Edna.
83	5	"Meet the Retraction"	Chip Fields	Myra J.	July 7, 2010	405
Cora accepts Reggie's engagement and he retracts. Cora is upset at first, but when Reggie explains his actions, they agree to a long engagement. Meanwhile, Joaquin is jealous at the prospect of a new baby.
84	6	"Meet the Birthday"	Roger M. Bobb	David A. Arnold	July 7, 2010	406
When Will forgets Sasha's birthday, Brown and Cora help him make it up to her. Meanwhile Brianna goes to Cora for advice about her new boyfriend.
85	7	"Meet the Taxpayer"	Kim Fields	Brian Egeston	July 14, 2010	407
Sasha faints and is rushed to the hospital, where she discovers that she's had a miscarriage. Meanwhile, Derek helps Brown with his taxes for the first time.
86	8	"Meet the Makeover"	Chip Hurd	Joseph Hampton & Anthony C. Hill	July 14, 2010	408
When Will discovers that Renee helps Sasha feel better, he pays Renee to spend time with her. Meanwhile Brown becomes a magician at Joaquin's sleepover after he accidentally breaks Joaquin's video game.
87	9	"Meet the Instigator"	Chip Fields	Myra J.	July 21, 2010	409
Reggie and Brown get stuck in the school storage room; Vera and Edna hang out.
88	10	"Meet the Candlelight Dinner"	Chip Fields	Carlos Portugal	July 21, 2010	410
Joaquin has a crush on Simone and goes to the extreme to impress her. Brown sabotages Reggie's romantic dinner for Cora and she gets sick.
89	11	"Meet the Breakout"	Chip Fields	David A. Arnold	July 28, 2010	411
Brown is recruited to do a TV testimonial for a body cream but it causes him to break out, literally. Special Guest Star: Bill Bellamy as Anthony
90	12	"Meet the Other Side"	Kim Fields	Joseph Hampton	July 28, 2010	412
Brown refers Derek to the hospital as his assistant but Derek holds back so Brown can keep his job. Cora is shocked to see another side of Reggie.
91	13	"Meet the House Guest"	Chip Hurd	Myra J.	August 4, 2010	413
Thelma stays at the Browns' while Reggie is out of town, and she and Cora clash. Meanwhile, Renee borrows money from Will.
92	14	"Meet the Trainer"	Kim Fields	David A. Arnold	August 4, 2010	414
Cora helps an overweight student with low self-esteem; Derek helps Brown make an exercise tape.
93	15	"Meet the Neelys"	Kim Fields	Vanessa Middleton	August 11, 2010	415
After winning a recipe contest. the Neelys come to the Brown house to host their cooking show. Brianna teaches Joaquin a lesson about being a sore winner. Special Guest Star: Pat & Gina Neely as Themselves and Kim Fields as Kim (Director)
94	16	"Meet the Bird Brains"	Chip Fields	Brian Egeston	August 11, 2010	416
Brown tries to find the neighbors' lost pet to claim the reward.
95	17	"Meet the White Lie"	Chip Fields	Brian Egeston	August 18, 2010	417
Derek becomes a role model for Joaquin; Renee is admitted to the hospital.
96	18	"Meet the Celebrity"	Chip Fields	Joseph Hampton	August 18, 2010	418
Brown, Derek, and Renee try to get a photo of a celebrity's newborn.
97	19	"Meet the California Dreamer"	Kim Fields	Myra J.	August 25, 2010	419
Cora is upset when Reggie decides to stay in California. Meanwhile Brown teaches Brianna to drive and Renee promotes a blood drive at the hospital.
98	20	"Meet the Not-So-Funny Valentine"	Kim Fields	Brian Egeston	August 25, 2010	420
The guys decide to boycott Valentine's Day, but the girls have something special planned. Meanwhile Brown thinks Renee has a crush on him.
99	21	"Meet the Forgiveness"	Kim Fields	James Hannah	September 1, 2010	421
Colonel meets the son of a man he fought with in the war. Meanwhile Brown sees Dr. Jawfy for a checkup.
100	22	"Meet the Layoff"	Kim Fields	Joseph Hampton	September 1, 2010	422
A cut in the school budget forces Gordon to have to lay off Brown or Cora. Meanwhile Sasha regifts to Renee.
101	23	"Meet the Baby Daddy"	Chip Fields	Brian Egeston	September 8, 2010	423
A man shows up claiming to be Cora's father. Meanwhile Renee promotes a blood-drive party. Special Guest Star: Reginald VelJohnson as Ernie Wilson
102	24	"Meet the Phobia"	Kim Fields	David A. Arnold	September 8, 2010	424
Will discovers that an old friend of Sasha's is making herself sick due to an irrational fear. The Colonel and Derek try to get Brown off their golf team.
103	25	"Meet the Confession"	Kim Fields	Joseph Hampton	September 15, 2010	425
Thinking she's dying, Vera confesses a secret. Simone tells Brianna she's pregnant.
104	26	"Meet the Best Friend"	Kim Fields	Vanessa Middleton	September 15, 2010	426
Will's good friend Anthony brings another woman over, angering Sasha. Cora bets Brown he can't be quiet for an entire day. Guest Star: Bill Bellamy as Anthony
105	27	"Meet the Home Alone"	Kim Fields	Chris Spencer	September 22, 2010	427
Joaquin is left home alone when a major storm traps everyone else at Colonel and Edna's house.
106	28	"Meet the Nightmare"	Kim Fields	Robin M. Henry	September 22, 2010	428
Sasha becomes jealous when Renee's friend comes to town. Brown is haunted by nightmares of kissing Edna.
107	29	"Meet the Hero"	Kim Fields	David A. Arnold	September 29, 2010	429
Brown accidentally becomes a hero. Brianna and Jamal sneak out to a costume party, taking Joaquin along.
108	30	"Meet the Campers"	Kim Fields	Joseph Hampton	September 29, 2010	430
Brianna goes to a party and lies to Simone about it. Joaquin is scared to go camping so Will and Brown have a trial run with him in the backyard. Absent: Tamela Mann as Cora
109	31	"Meet the Product Party"	Chip Hurd	Carlos Portugal	October 20, 2010	431
Cora asks Renee to do a product-demonstration at her women's social group and they are shocked when Renee reveals the products. Brianna confronts pregnant Simone when she drinks at a party.
110	32	"Meet the Crush"	Kim Fields	Joseph Hampton	October 20, 2010	432
Derek has a crush on Renee. Brown gets fired from the school, forbidden to return until he apologizes to Gordon: a loathsome prospect.
111	33	"Meet the Harassment"	Kim Fields	Carlos Portugal	October 27, 2010	433
A woman charges Sasha with sexual harassment. Joaquin's concerned teacher visits the house when he writes an essay about his family.
112	34	"Meet the Replacement"	Roger M. Bobb	Carlos Portugal	October 27, 2010	434
When Renee quits, Sasha hires a replacement who's even worse. Derek turns to Brown when he loses his girlfriend.
113	35	"Meet the Deception"	Kim Fields	Michelle Lesley Joseph	November 3, 2010	435
Will is angry when he finds out Sasha is taking birth control. Brown is harassed by an overzealous bill collector.
114	36	"Meet the Nightlife"	Chip Hurd	Dimonique Davis	November 3, 2010	436
Sasha's wallet is stolen while she, Will, and Renee are at a club; to everyone's surprise, Brianna knows who stole it.
115	37	"Meet the Big Payoff"	Kim Fields	Anthony C. Hill	November 10, 2010	437
Brianna learns an important lesson about the dangers of texting and driving when her boyfriend Antonio is killed in a car accident while texting and driving, going to a party. Brown's cousin shows up with another get-rich scheme; Cora talks Brown out of it, but the business works. Guest Star: Rodney Perry as Mr. Brown's cousin
116	38	"Meet the Wingman"	Chip Hurd	Carmelita Arroyo	November 10, 2010	438
Anthony convinces Will to be his wingman when they meet up with two women. The women show up at the house. Guest Star: Bill Bellamy as Anthony and Julissa Bermudez as Raquel
117	39	"Meet the Seoul Sister"	Kim Fields	Carlos Portugal	November 10, 2010	439
Colonel discovers his first fiancee didn't die in the war after all. A classmate of Joaquin befriends him to get close to Brianna.
118	40	"Meet the Neighbor"	Roger M. Bobb	Brian Egeston	November 10, 2010	440
Cora struggles to say no to an intrusive neighbor. Joaquin sabotages Brianna when a college recruiter comes to visit. Special Guest Star: Kym Whitley as Yvonne
11	41	"Meet the Alternative"	Chip Hurd	Myra J.	November 10, 2010	441
Darnell is uncomfortable when Cora invites him to Bible study and the church lady hits on him. Simone contemplates putting her baby up for adoption.
120	42	"Meet the Recession"	Kim Fields	Carlos Portugal	November 10, 2010	442
Edna and Cora help Thelma deal with losing her job and home. Brown and Colonel take part in a pyramid scheme.
121	43	"Meet the Old Fling"	Kim Fields	Dimonique Davis	November 17, 2010	443
Sasha's mom Kate visits, bringing a man half her age. Meanwhile, Darnell takes over Cora's detention period and it becomes a party. Special Guest Star: Beverly Johnson as Kate
122	44	"Meet the Unwelcome Back"	Kim Fields	Anthony C. Hill	November 17, 2010	444
When Reggie returns unannounced, he is surprised to find that Cora isn't "that into him" anymore. Meanwhile Sasha's ex comes to the hospital as a patient. Special Guest Star: Finesse Mitchell as Tory
123	45	"Meet the Defendant"	Chip Fields	Carlos Portugal	November 24, 2010	445
Cora takes the Colonel to court when her car's breakdown causes her to have achy feet. Joaquin's birthday party is nearly ruined when Sasha, Will, and Brianna interfere. Special Guest Star: Judge Greg Mathis as himself
124	46	"Meet the Attraction"	Kim Fields	Brian Egeston	November 24, 2010	446
Brianna becomes jealous when Jamal finds Simone's life more interesting than hers for his short film. Cora and Brown have to take Reggie's CPR class.
125	47	"Meet the New Reggie"	Kim Fields	Myra J.	December 1, 2010	447
Brown and Derek help Reggie improve himself to win Cora. Meanwhile Renee's ex comes in for a checkup and receives shocking news. Special Guest Star: Khalil Kain as Michael
126	48	"Meet the Sugar Momma"	Kim Fields	Chrystal A. Ellzy	December 1, 2010	448
Renee passes out condoms at the school's health fair, putting her and Cora at odds. Derek meets a rich girl, Claudia, who wants to run his life. Special Guest Star: Christina Milian as Claudia
127	49	"Meet the Country Cousin"	Chip Fields	Anthony C. Hill	December 8, 2010	449
Sasha's country relative (Denise Boutte) comes to help while she's away and the family has to get used to her ways. Brianna makes-over a homely girl, who becomes a prima donna.
128	50	"Meet the Non-Frequent Flyer"	Kim Fields	Joseph Hampton	December 8, 2010	450
Brown takes his first plane flight with Cora and everything goes wrong. Derek is mistaken for a famous person and he uses it to his advantage.
129	51	"Meet the Football Coach"	Kim Fields	Joseph Hampton	December 15, 2010	451
Simone introduces her mom--who wants Simone to marry Josh, her child's father--to Sasha. The football team win their first game when Cora takes over as coach. Special Guest Star: Kellita Smith as Alma Taylor
130	52	"Meet the Shopaholic"	Kim Fields	Steve Coulter	December 15, 2010	452
Cora gets addicted to online shopping. Meanwhile, Brown finds an artifact in his backyard, which leads him to digging for treasure.
131	53	"Meet the Patience"	Kim Fields	Brian Egeston	December 22, 2010	453
Cora's patience is tested when a lonely old lady continues to show up at her door looking for a companion. Brianna gets her first job at a fast-food restaurant. Absent: Tony Vaughn as Colonel, Juanita Jennings as Edna and Terri J. Vaughn as Renee
132	54	"Meet the Dealmaker"	Kim Fields	Myra J.	December 22, 2010	454
A friend of Reggie's tries to illegally recruit his players. An essay Joaquin wrote for Brianna wins a prize. Absent: Tony Vaughn as Colonel, Juanita Jennings as Edna and Terri J. Vaughn as Renee

=== Season 5 (2011) ===
No. overall	No. in season	Title	Directed by	Written by	Original release date	Prod. code
133	1	"Meet the Real Wedding"	Kim Fields	Anthony C. Hill	October 28, 2011	501
Colonel and Edna finally get ready for their wedding, and they seek help from the Brown family. Elsewhere, Renee does a good deed for Sasha, but she expects something in return. Absent: Logan Browning as Brianna and Gunnar Washington as Joaquin
134	2	"Meet the Knock-Off"	Kim Fields	Brian Egeston	October 28, 2011	502
Cora buys an expensive purse, but claims that it is an inexpensive copy. Yvonne sells candy, raising suspicion in Mr. Brown. Guest Star: Kym Whitley as Yvonne Absent: Lamman Rucker as Will, Denise Boutte as Sasha, Logan Browning as Brianna, Terri J. Vaughn as Renee and Gunnar Washington as Joaquin Note: This was Maurice G. Smith's last appearance as Reggie
135	3	"Meet the Reunion"	Kim Fields	Carlos Portugal & Myra J.	November 4, 2011	503
Mr. Brown clashes with his former singing-groupmate (Eddie Levert) as they prepare for their class reunion. Renee babysits Joaquin and seeks his input when she gambles. Special Guest Star: Eddie Levert as Teddy Trevel Absent: Denise Boutte as Sasha, Tony Vaughn as Colonel, Juanita Jennings as Edna and Logan Browning as Brianna
136	4	"Meet the Whodunit"	Kim Fields	Anthony C. Hill	November 4, 2011	504
Mr. Brown tries to figure out who ate his rice and gravy; Renee faces possible termination after being investigated by a member of the Nurses Auditing Board.
137	5	"Meet the Telethon"	Roger M. Bobb	Anthony C. Hill	November 11, 2011	505
Sasha host a telethon to raise 100,000 and Mr. Brown knocks out the star. Absent: Juanita Jennings as Edna
138	6	"Meet the Hustle"	Kim Fields	David A. Arnold	November 11, 2011	506
Mr. Brown and Colonel tries to get even with the gangsters that ripped them off. Renee sells wigs at the hospital. Absent: Logan Browning as Brianna and Gunnar Washington as Joaquin
139	7	"Meet the Switch"	Kim Fields	Joseph Hampton	November 18, 2011	507
Will and Joaquin magically switch bodies after Joaquin wished to be an adult. Mr. Brown tries to get in contact with the electric company regarding his electric bill. Note: This was Terri J. Vaughn's final appearance as Renee. Absent: Tony Vaughn as Colonel and Juanita Jennings as Edna
140	8	"Meet the Family Portrait"	Kim Fields	Tanya Hoffler-Moore	November 18, 2011	508
Mr. Brown decides to have a family portrait. However, a series of conflict prevents it from happening.
