= Matt and John Yuan =

American twin actors, writers, artists (b. 1973)

- Born: December 14, 1973 (age 51)
- Occupation(s): Actor, writer, comic book artists
- Years active: 2004–present

Matthew "Matt" and John Yuan, also known collectively as The Yuan Twins, (born December 14, 1973) are American twin actors, writers and comic book artists. They wrote the micro-budget zombie film, Death Valley: The Revenge of Bloody Bill for The Asylum in 2004 for producer David Michael Latt. As of 2022, they are the deputy publishers of First Comics.

== Biography ==
They made their acting debut in 2009, in Jody Hill's Observe and Report as Ronny Barnhardt's (Seth Rogen) security guard underlings. Both are fans of Dungeons & Dragons and have filmed a series of zombie survival videos for MTV Iggy. They are also currently the unofficial spokesmen for BOOM! Studios and have guest blogged for Wired magazine's Underwire website.

In September 2012, the Yuan Brothers began writing, drawing, and publishing comic books, starting with a self-published titled Declan and Chang: Sweet F.A. According to the commentary in issue number two and an interview for the website Fanboycomics.net, the characters and story are based upon a MechWarrior RPG campaign that they have, as of 2013, been running with their friends for the past fifteen years. As of 2015, they have created the comic book series Serving Supes, Inspector Oh, and Love Town for First Comics.

On February 27, 2022, they were named Deputy Publishers for First Comics.

== Filmography ==
=== Film ===
Film roles
Year	Title	Matt	John	Notes
2004	Death Valley: The Revenge of Bloody Bill	Zombie		Also writers
2009	Observe and Report	Matt Yuen	John Yuen	
2013	Jewaholic			Short film
2015	Larry Gaye: Renegade Male Flight Attendant	Johann Kaminsky	Stuart Nevins	
2016	Bad Roomies	Justin	Jason	
2016	The Greasy Strangler	Vendor		
2018	Seven Stages to Achieve Eternal Bliss	Cultist		

=== Television ===
Television roles
Year	Title	Matt	John	Notes
2010	It's Always Sunny in Philadelphia	—	Pizza Delivery Guy	Episode: "Mac and Charlie: White Trash"
2011	CSI: Crime Scene Investigation	Heavy Set Lookiloo	Heavy Set Lookiloo Twin	Episode: "Man Up"
2011	Rules of Engagement	Ronald	Donald	Episode: "Double Down"
2012	Dating Rules From My Future Self	Frank Dixon	Otto Dixon	3 episodes
2012	House of Lies	Baker #1	Baker #2	Episode: "Our Descent Into Los Angeles"
2012	The Smart One	Reporter	—	TV Pilot
2012	Jimmy Kimmel Live!	—	Chinese Guillermo	1 episode
2013	Raising Hope	Hubert	Nick	Episode: "Lord of the Ring"
2013	Arrested Development	Dean Fleer	Doug Fleer	3 episodes
2013	The Real Potheads of North Hollywood	Yoga Students		TV Pilot
2014	The Millers	Shy Nerd #1	Shy Nerd #2	Episode: "Con-Troversy"
2015-2016	Crazy Ex-Girlfriend	David	Ben	2 episodes
2016	Con Man	Con Attendee #1	Con Attendee #2	Episode: "Pin Cushion"
2017	Minimum Wage	—	Jordan	TV Pilot
2018	To Tell the Truth	Himself		1 episode
2019	WTF Baron Davis	Quan's Brother	Quan	Episode: "Kenny's Side Hustle"
2020	Agents of S.H.I.E.L.D.	Ronnie Chang	Tommy Chang	Episode: "The Totally Excellent Adventures of Mack and The D"
2022	Little America	Dave	Dave's Brother	Episode: "The 9th Caller"
