= The Perfection =

2018 film by Richard Shepard

- Official poster
- Directed by: Richard Shepard
- Written by: Richard Shepard; Eric Charmelo; Nicole Snyder
- Produced by: Bill Block; Stacey Reiss; Richard Shepard
- Starring: Allison Williams; Logan Browning; Steven Weber; Alaina Huffman
- Cinematography: Vanja Černjul
- Edited by: David Dean
- Music by: Paul Haslinger
- Production companies: Miramax; Capstone Film Group
- Distributed by: Netflix
- Release dates: September 20, 2018 (Fantastic Fest); May 24, 2019 (United States)
- Running time: 90 minutes
- Country: United States
- Language: English

The Perfection is a 2018 American psychological horror thriller film co-written and directed by Richard Shepard. The film stars Allison Williams, Logan Browning, Steven Weber, and Alaina Huffman.

The Perfection had its world premiere at Fantastic Fest on September 20, 2018, and was released by Netflix on May 24, 2019. The film received mixed reviews from critics.

== Plot ==
Charlotte Willmore is a talented young cellist who left Bachoff, a prestigious music school in Boston, to care for her terminally ill mother. Following her mother's death, Charlotte reaches out to Anton, the head of Bachoff, who invites her to Shanghai in hopes of selecting a new student. Charlotte befriends Elizabeth “Lizzie” Wells, Anton's star pupil and her replacement. After a night of clubbing, they return to Lizzie's hotel room and have sex.

The next morning, Charlotte offers the hungover Lizzie some ibuprofen, which she takes with alcohol, and the two go on a trip through rural China. Boarding a bus after a street food meal, Lizzie feels sick and takes more of Charlotte's ibuprofen. Lizzie later throws up maggots and panics, frightening the other passengers until the driver kicks her and Charlotte from the bus. Increasingly ill and paranoid, Lizzie hallucinates bugs bursting out of her skin. Charlotte offers her a meat cleaver, and Lizzie hacks off her own right hand. It is revealed that Charlotte drugged Lizzie with her late mother's medication, which induces nausea and hallucinations as well as stealing the meat cleaver and manipulating Lizzie into amputating herself.

Three weeks later, Anton and his wife, Paloma, give their new student from China, Zhang Li, a tour of Bachoff and the "Chapel," an acoustically perfect room where the academy's best students perform. That night, Lizzie arrives unexpectedly, her right hand missing. She explains her recollection of events to Anton and Paloma, and that she was discovered unconscious on the side of the road with a makeshift tourniquet keeping her alive. Lizzie is adamant that Charlotte orchestrated the incident out of jealousy. Anton, initially sympathetic, turns cold and expels Lizzie from the academy.

Lizzie confronts Charlotte in her home, subdues her with a taser, and drags her back to Bachoff. When Charlotte awakens, she is confronted by Anton and reveals why she orchestrated Lizzie's dismemberment. Charlotte figured out Bachoff's elite students are indoctrinated and forced to "pay the price" by Anton's sex cult. In flashbacks, Charlotte had also experienced years of rape and torture at the hands of Anton for failing to achieve musical "Perfection." She planned Lizzie's amputation to save her from Bachoff.

Anton brings Charlotte to the Chapel and forces her to perform, saying a small mistake will result in Zhang receiving the same treatment. Unsettled, Charlotte eventually makes a mistake. Everyone leaves except Anton's associates, Theis and Geoffrey, who prepare to rape her. Lizzie threatens to rape Charlotte with her hand stump as revenge, but Theis and Geoffrey suddenly collapse and die. Lizzie and Charlotte kiss and it is revealed the two conspired together, poisoning the men's drinks. Charlotte's plot to render Lizzie expendable to the academy resulted in Lizzie coming to her senses about Anton's brainwashing, and together they plotted revenge.

The two drug and kill Paloma, then confront Anton, armed with kitchen knives. Anton manages to mutilate Charlotte's left arm before Lizzie knocks him unconscious. Some unspecified time later, Anton, his mouth and eyes sewn shut and limbs amputated, is forced to listen as Charlotte and Lizzie perform for him in the Chapel playing as one, each compensating for the other's missing hand.

== Cast ==
- Allison Williams as Charlotte Willmore
  - Molly Grace as young Charlotte Willmore
- Logan Browning as Elizabeth "Lizzie" Wells
  - Milah Thompson as young Elizabeth "Lizzie" Wells
- Steven Weber as Anton, the head of Bachoff Academy who is secretly running an abusive sex cult.
- Alaina Huffman as Paloma, Anton's wife
- Mark Kandborg as Theis
- Graeme Duffy as Geoffrey
- Eileen Tian as Zhang Li

== Production ==
In September 2017, it was announced Miramax would produce and finance the film, with Richard Shepard, directing from a screenplay by himself, Nicole Snyder and Eric Charmelo, with Bill Block producing. In October 2017, Allison Williams joined the cast of the film, with Stacey Reiss serving as a producer on the film. In December 2017, Logan Browning joined the cast of the film.

== Release ==
The film had its world premiere at Fantastic Fest on September 20, 2018. Shortly after, Netflix acquired distribution rights to the film. It was released on May 24, 2019.

== Reception ==
On the review aggregator website Rotten Tomatoes, the film holds an approval rating of 70% based on 98 reviews, with an average of 6.6/10. The website's critical consensus reads: "Led by a pair of compelling performances, The Perfection is a smart, gripping thriller that barbs its wild twists with cutting wit." On Metacritic, it has a weighted average score of 60 out of 100, based on 15 critics, indicating "mixed or average reviews".

Dennis Harvey of Variety wrote that the film's story "is easier to admire than actually like, given somewhat repellent content grounded in character psychology that does not bear close scrutiny after these terse 90 minutes are over", but added: "the icily well-crafted gamesmanship Shepard and company have devised certainly makes that time pass quickly, if uncomfortably." Katie Rife of The A.V. Club gave the film a grade of B−, writing that it "takes deep, fetishistic satisfaction in pushing the envelope, then pushing it some more, building in seductive fits and shocking starts to an orgiastic frenzy of cinematic excess." Frank Scheck of The Hollywood Reporter called it "a stylishly made, nail-biting effort that proves consistently engrossing."

Barry Hertz of The Globe and Mail was more critical, giving the film a score of 1.5/4 and writing: "most everyone who watches The Perfection will instead be staring at the screen slack-jawed, dumbfounded at the gory silliness they endured." The New Yorker's Richard Brody called it "a trite jumble that confronts its ripped-from-the-news theme as an impersonal check box."

== Soundtrack ==
The soundtrack for the film features multiple classical arrangements of Bach, Mozart, and Handel, among others. It also features several non-classical tracks:

- "At Least I Still Have You" by Rose Liu (Jason Zachary Parris, Lestley Renaldo Pierce, Rose Liu)
- "Ready or Not" by Gizzle (Morgan Dorr, Timothy Healy, Glenda Proby)
- "Let's Make This a Moment to Remember" by Chromatics (Johnny Jewel)
- "It's On" by Deuce Mobb (Jonathan Pakfar)
- "Petals" by Chromatics (Courtney Love, Eric Erlandson, Billy Corgan)
