= Roger M. Bobb =

American television producer and director

Roger Marcellus Bobb is an American producer and television director. He is the president and CEO of Bobbcat Films, a film and television production company based in Atlanta, Georgia formed in 2011. Prior to creating Bobbcat films, Bobb was the executive vice president of Tyler Perry Studios.

Bobb has won seven NAACP Image Awards and has produced 11 Tyler Perry films grossing over half a billion dollars. He has produced over 600 television sitcom episodes in his career such as House of Payne, Meet the Browns, The Rickey Smiley Show, Last Call and Mann & Wife.

Bobb also produced and directed the television movies Cooking Up Christmas, Holiday Heist, Friend Request, Raising Izzie, In the Meantime, Girlfriends Getaway and Girlfriends Getaway 2. He is a former DGA Trainee.

He has appeared on the reality TV show "Real Housewives of Atlanta".

== Early life ==
Bobb was born in Balham, London, England of Guyanese parents, and raised in Brooklyn, New York.

He attended Brooklyn Technical High School, Brooklyn College and the School of Visual Arts.

== Awards and recognition ==
Bobb been nominated for nine and has won seven NAACP Image awards: five for producing the sitcom Tyler Perry's House of Payne, one for producing the film For Colored Girls and one for producing the series It's a Mann's World. He is the recipient of the Caribbean American Movers and Shakers Awards, for his work in the film industry.

== Filmography ==
- Cop Land (1997)
- Preaching to the Choir (2005)
- State Property 2 (2005)
- Diary of a Mad Black Woman (2005)
- Madea's Family Reunion (2006)
- Tyler Perry's House of Payne (TV series) (2006; TV) (directed)
- Daddy's Little Girls (2007)
- Why Did I Get Married? (2007)
- Meet the Browns (2008)
- The Family That Preys (2008)
- Madea Goes to Jail (2009)
- I Can Do Bad All By Myself (2009)
- Why Did I Get Married Too? (2010)
- For Colored Girls Who Have Considered Suicide When the Rainbow Is Enuf (2010)
- Madea's Big Happy Family (2011)
- Raising Izzie (2012)
- Let the Church Say Amen (2012)
- Girlfriends Getaway (2014) (directed)
- Girlfriends Getaway 2 (2015) (directed)
- Bad Dad Rehab (2016)
- Life-Size 2 (2018)
- Holiday Heist (2019) (directed)
- Same Time Next Christmas (2019)
- Friend Request (2020) (directed)
- Steppin' Back to Love (2020) (directed)
- The Thing About Harry (2020)
- Open (2020)
- Alieu the Dreamer (2020)
- Cooking Up Christmas (2020) (directed)
- A Chestnut Family Christmas (2021) (directed)
- A Christmas Stray (2021) (directed)
- Sense and Sensibility (2024) (directed)

== Television ==
- New York Undercover
- NYPD Blue
- Tyler Perry's House of Payne (directed 2 episodes)
- Meet the Browns (directed 4 episodes)
- The Battle (directed 5 episodes)
- The Rickey Smiley Show (directed 27 episodes)
- It's a Mann's World
- Mann & Wife (directed 27 episodes)
- Rickey Smiley For Real
- Last Call
- Reasonable Doubt
