= Why Did I Get Married? (play) =

2003 American stage play by Tyler Perry

Why Did I Get Married? (He Proposed To Me)
- Original language: English
- Written by: Tyler Perry
- Characters: Poppy, Diane, Terry, Sheila, Mike, Trina and Troy
- Subject: Marriage, Infidelity
- Genre: Comedy-Drama
- Setting: Cabin Retreat

Premiere
- Date: October 2, 2003
- Place: Atlanta, Georgia, U.S.

Why Did I Get Married? (He Proposed to Me) is a 2003 American stage play created, written, produced and directed by Tyler Perry. It originally starred Kelly Price as Sheila and LaVan Davis as Poppy. The live performance, featuring Cheryl Pepsii Riley as Shelia, released on DVD on June 27, 2006, was recorded live in Atlanta at The Ferst Center for the Arts at Georgia Institute of Technology in December 2005. It was released on DVD alongside Madea Goes to Jail and Madea's Family Reunion.

== Plot ==
=== Act I ===
The scenes unfold with Poppy (LaVan Davis) speaking to his late wife about the state of the cabin in which we find him, and after a premature cessation of cleaning due to his "being tired" he sits and looks through an old photo album. He speaks to his wife again recalling her skills with the children and her ability to discern issues in relationships and keep them strong. Just as he hopes that she is watching over them Diana (Donna Stewart) and Terry (Greg Stewart) arrive.

After greeting Poppy they begin to help him clean, while sharing news of themselves and their marriage including her making partner at her firm. Poppy goes to collect more cleaning supplies at which point Terry tries to draw Diana to a bedroom to make love but she refuses for now wanting to spend some time with Poppy and to greet Sheila (Cheryl Pepsii Riley) when she arrives. After assuring him that she will be more than willing later he convinces her to provide him with an incentive, namely shaking it for him, during which Poppy returns. He teases them both about it revealing his strong belief that a woman's behind has caused wars and rumors of wars claiming it says so in the Bible making them both laugh. They tell him of Sheila's weight gain, some eighty pounds, and discuss other family issues until Mike (Cordell Moore) enters.

Diana had previously voiced her objections to both Mike's presence and existence feeling he is an unsuitable husband for her friend and a very unlikeable man. Mike does nothing to dissuade her of this opinions as when questioned about Sheila's whereabouts answers disgustedly that she is outside bringing in the bags by herself. This shocks Poppy and Terry and infuriates Diana but before she can confront Mike about it Sheila enters with the bags. She greets everyone warmly and they greet her in return, though Poppy reveals some concern about her weight and size he does not speak on the matter, though Mike does in very rude and cruel terms embarrassing Sheila and further enraging Diana as well as prompting shock from Poppy and Terry.

Sensing his wife's displeasure Terry takes Mike to a bedroom to talk with Poppy joining them to attempt to make Mike see the error of his ways. Mike expresses his disgust both with Sheila and the marriage retreat itself despite the fact that it has become a yearly tradition. He further reveals that Trina (Demetria McKinney), Sheila's best friend, an attractive single woman, is also coming and seems unusually interested in her presence. Poppy and Terry grow suspicious but while attempting to talk to Mike about it poppy accidentally informs Mike that terry had cheated on Diana three years previous. Mike, delighted, mocks Terry then demands details. Terry explains that he was in the wrong and how very much he regrets the act but Mike dismisses this. Poppy warns both of them that women always know but Mike again dismisses this. Poppy leaves and Terry entreats Mike to treat Sheila better but Mike startles him by declaring he desires a divorce from Sheila.

Terry makes an impassioned please for Mike to see that he is wrong but Mike remains dubious as we return to focus on the women as they return to the stage. They chat about the state of their marriages, sex and life in general while Poppy occasionally chimes in until Trina arrives. Sheila attempts to get Diana to be nice but she refuses reacting with a harsh coldness to the single woman who after flirting with poppy prompting his return to his own room goes to speak to Mike and Terry.

Diana begins to chase her but recalling a promise not to cause drama or trouble sits back down and idly mentions Terry's infidelity. Disbelieving Sheila scoffs, only to learn from Diana that it is indeed true who proceeds to tell her the details of the incident and the long path of recovery the couple had to travel to rekindle their marriage and love. Diana attempts to encourage Sheila to do the same but Sheila, already depressed and in doubt because Mike has already been caught cheating and refuses to sleep with her because, she feels, that he is disgusted by her weight gain.

After expressing her depression and worry Sheila begins to doubt her ability to fix her marriage but Diana encourages her try but failing that to find her own peace in herself and not let things crush her. As they embrace Troy (Anthony Grant), another single friend arrives. he has along history of an attraction Sheila but has never acted upon it because of Mike, and has also become something of the third wheel of the group as he is known to bring less than satisfactory girlfriends to the retreat. This year however he has come alone except for his guitar which he calls Justine and with which he teases Sheila about being jealous. Embarrassed she tries to defend herself but Troy and Diana continue to tease as Mike, Terry and Trina rejoin the group.

Diana, noting Trina sitting rather close to Mike, forcefully yanks her away while guiding Sheila to take her place much to the annoyance of Trina and Mike who manages not to show. Troy distracts them by pointing his guitar and everyone cries out happily wanting him to play something. Poppy teases them with the guitar for a long moment then begins to play at which point Troy and Trina begin to sing "I Am Glad To Be In That Number" joined by Poppy, Diana, Sheila, Mike and Terry. Excited by the singing, of which Sheila was the focus she attempts to draw Mike into a private conversation but he reveals annoyance breaking her passion for the singing. She gets him alone and tries to convince him to go to counseling. Mike refuses and cruelly insults forcing her to look at herself in a mirror and when she says she is his wife he replies that she is his problem. Hurt and desperate she begins to plead with him offering to do anything to save their marriage. He responds with "Go to Hell." and walks out leaving Sheila crushed and despondent.

Poppy and Troy are in Troy's room as he unpacks and Poppy catches up. Poppy blatantly asks when Troy will settle down and get married. Troy says when he finds the right woman. Poppy and Troy continue to talk about marriage and finding the right woman and Poppy encourages him to continue searching as well as teasing him about his past relationships.

Sheila comes out of the bedroom trying to speak to Mike only to find Diana in the hall watching Mike and Trina sitting very close together on the couch talking privately. Diana is displeased but Sheila tries to convince her it is platonic as Trina and Mike talk about things she knows nothing about. Diana, trying not to hurt her friend, reluctantly agrees to join the two. Trina praises Mike to Sheila who attempts to sit beside Mike but he shifts his body not allowing her near him forcing her away much to Diana's displeasure.

Terry calls the men to set the table for dinner leaving the women alone. Sheila tries to convince to Trina to try with Troy, but she expresses disdain and her plan to marry the right rich man as she believes troy is weak and lacking the wealth she requires. Diana mocks her then confronts her prompting Trina to respond. The men rush in to break things up and Sheila tries to speak to Diana about her behavior as behind her Trina storms out followed closely by Mike. Diana points this out to the shocked Sheila

Later that day Mike and Trina return in very happy moods and when questioned by Sheila about their location Mike begins to fumble words though Trina assures her they were at the lake looking at the boats. Diana continues to express her disdain for both of them. Sheila asks if Mike is hungry, as they had sat around waiting for Mike and Trina to return rather than eating, drawing yet another insult from Mike. Poppy calls him out on it but Mike ignores him so Poppy, in response to Trina's question, tells them that they had been discussed marriage allowing Terry to distract Diana with the state of their marriage. Trina expressed her disgust with Diana and Terry as she believes marriage is fake. Yet again Diana speaks her mind leading to Trina to confront her about her behavior, claiming that she knows that Diana talks about her behind her back to Sheila, embarrassing Sheila.

Diana, showing no concern for Trina or her supposed feelings attacks her in return calling her out about her affair with Mike which everyone else reacts in shock but Diana refuses to be silenced. The men back off as Diana launches in Trina who weakly objects to the accusation. Sheila, ever the true friend tries to defend her only to be yet again insulted by Mike. Sheila calls for silence and says she wishes to leave. Trina gets into Diana's face and when threatened runs to the hall while Mike prepares to pay Poppy for the weekend and Sheila miserably staggers about waiting to leave.

Troy notices a fallen empty condom wrapper and seeing it Sheila calls him out on it. Poppy flees to his room while Sheila points out the state of the wrapper after Mike had tried to claim it was for him and Sheila as he wanted no more kids. Mike covers why trying to push her out the door to which Trina agrees trying to entice Sheila out of the cabin but Diana interrupts calling her out on her cowardice. She also confronts Mike who starts to express violent intent toward Diana but Terry moves between them forcing Mike to back down. Sheila asks Trina about the affair and she coldly replies that it did happen. Shocked to tears Sheila watched in horror as Mike walks past her to put his arms possessively around Trina who surveys the room proudly. Sheila retreats to Diana and Terry who help her sit, while troy moves to comfort her only for Mike to approach forcing him to move aside.

Mike pulls out a set of keys explaining he has rented Sheila an apartment across town. He shocks everyone by saying that he has paid the rent for six months but after that she will be on her own, he has changed the locks to the house and instructed the gate guard not to let her in. Her children are at her mother's implying he is refusing to take them as well. He allows her to keep her vehicle, and seeming to think this wills often the blow gives her a pat on the shoulder which she flinches away from. During this Diana had found some Vaseline and had been preparing to fight but is stopped by Terry as he does not want there to be violence in addition to all of this as Sheila needs her friend now more than vengeance. Reluctantly she agrees then threatens Mike because as a lawyer she will be taking the case and she plans on destroying Mike in court.

Mike attempts to assuage this clear point by offering to take Sheila to her mother's but makes it clear he will not listen to her crying or endure her tears. Trina coldly agrees that he will explain. Sheila feigns agreement moving toward Mike by stumbling past the coffee table which contains a loaded pistol. Diana, having forgotten about it in all of this tries to get terry to agree to take Sheila home instead as Sheila retrieves the pistol and points it at Mike forcing him to flee and the others to attempt to calm her. Trina flees without Mike who runs after her and is seemingly shot in the rear immediately clutching himself there as he frantically exits the cabin while Diana calls for Terry to help Sheila but he is too busy keeping Diana from getting shot by the despondent Sheila.

Sheila empties the clip at Mike at which point Troy takes the gun from her and Sheila breaks down into violent sobs. Terry and troy go to check on Mike and Trina as Diana gets Sheila, still sobbing inconsolably, to sit. Sheila cries out to Mike, then to God tears still running down her face.

=== Act II ===
A year later Diana and Terry are once again helping Poppy clean the cabin and discussing the changes in their circle of friends. Diana tells them of the divorce in which she had had Mike cornered and was about to take everything when Sheila had decided she did not want to and had given up on the case walking away. Mike and Trina, now married, walk in to the shock of the three. Terry offers to leaves but Diana refuses. Poppy informs Mike that he has been praying for him, clearly to Mike's discomfort. Mike tries to mend fences with Diana admitting she all but destroyed him in court but she will have none of it pointing out that she would have finished the job except for Sheila's apparent mercy which Trina dubs as weakness yet again infuriating Diana.

Diana insults Trina again increasing the tension. Trina begins to flirt with Terry but at Diana's warning Terry grabs Mike and the two flee the room. Trina tries, in her own caustic egotistical way, to make friends with Diana. Diana denies her attempts informing her that her faith in Christ will allow her to overcome anything Trina can come up with but also informs her that if Trina does anything else to threaten Diana's peace she will "come up missing."

Mike is casually showing his regret for divorcing Sheila to Terry, as Trina cannot cook, will not clean up the house and seems only to shop and otherwise spend his money apparently having maxed out several of his credit cards. When Terry calls him out on this Mike begins to jokingly insult Sheila again implying that she has likely put on even more weight and even pretends to be proud of the fact that he hurt her so badly. Terry is disgusted by this and threatens to end their friendship. Mike reveals in response that he does not have the time he had anymore, not even able to see his kids, as since the divorce his business has nearly collapsed and Mike is so busy trying to make more to replace what Trina rapidly spends he has no time for anything else. Terry points out how this is wrong and Mike gets annoyed and leaves the room. Terry tries to get him to see the right path but Mike refuses to listen as the women call for them all to come to dinner.

At table it is made clear that Trina did nothing to help and Mike pointedly shows her a plate and fork reminding her that they are needed to eat before Poppy begins a powerful musical prayer for the meal which Trina interrupts much to Poppy's annoyance. Dinner is a rather uncomfortable affair as Trina tries, yet again in her caustic manner, to be social but is soundly defeated by Diana in each attempt. Poppy calls for an end to it and Troy comes in and warmly greets everyone. Trina tries to flirt with him but Troy repels her firmly informing everyone he is in love. Mike, aggravated by Trina's behavior, threatens her making her return to her seat.

Troy implies he brought someone for the couples retreat though he is concerned about Trina and Mike's presence. Before the woman he came with comes in he rushes off to the restroom, but not before ensuring that he and Mike are 'cool.' Once Troy is gone Diana reminds Poppy and Terry about the poor choices Troy has made in the past and implies her intent to fight. Terry reminds her of Troy and Poppy's talk the year before but she is unconvinced and seemingly for good reason as Janice (Beverly Faulks), a very powerfully built lady, enters.

Janice is in denim overalls and a plaid flannel shirt and forcefully barges her way into the meal, silencing the spiteful Trina by shoving a bite of chicken into her mouth, having already thrown Mike from his chair at the table. Janice reveals she met Troy when his vehicle broke down and she brought him out to the cabin, her truck driving route being along the way. Trina disgustedly calls her a lesbian much to Diana's chagrin and Janice's anger. Janice playfully threatens her as Troy returns greeting her warmly. Janice takes her food and after smacking Trina on the butt feigning interest in her, she heads for the door taunting Trina before leaving.

Poppy expresses interest in the unusual Janice prompting first Diana to approach Troy about her then Mike who uses it as an opportunity to attack Sheila yet again about her size. While in the midst of a rather biting insult the door opens revealing a much changed Sheila. Her hair is much longer now and she is in a form fitting dress revealing a shapely figure much to everyone's shock. Diana is in utter but delighted shock as is Terry and Poppy. Troy then reveals that he and Sheila are together and the two passionately kiss as the scene shifts.

Mike is sitting alone when Trina returns after more shopping. Mike confronts her about it but she brushes him off until he calls her Sheila. He then says her name and goes into another comparison of the two as Sheila would never spend all that money irritating Trina. Mike pleads with her to stop spending all this money but she refuses so he then declares that the 'bank' is closed. She reacts by hinting that she has some lingerie in the bags she now plans to return but when Mike hint's she can keep that she responds that because of the 'bank' being closed everything else is now closed too.

Sheila, having entered from the kitchen to hear everything, waits until Trina leaves then mocks Mike for his mistake. Mike attempts to get close but she repels him with ease and little concern. She states that she feels sorry for him being in this state and points out that he had something good in her and gave it up. She also reveals that it had been she who had carefully kept the books balanced and thus Made Mike's business so very profitable. Surprised he asked if she had done that for him but she replies that she had done it for them as a good wife should. Clearly troubled Mike tries to make amends but again Sheila repels him.

Dismayed Mike scurries off as Terry and Diana come in from a walk and about to go make love when Sheila reveals her presence prompting Diana to go talk to her. Terry tries to convince her otherwise but Diana refuses saying she will be up later then heads down to speak to Sheila while Terry goes to pout and wait.

Diana wants to learn how Sheila has undergone this change not only of the physical but also the mental and physical. Sheila reveals that she has become a Christian, having done so just before walking out of the trial. Prior to that Troy had offered Sheila a job and needing an income as Mike had proven to be a lackluster father she needed it for her children so she had taken the position.

Troy worked closely with Sheila at his restaurant teaching her the business patiently and as time went on he challenged her to go with him to the gym and she agreed and now that she was doing it for herself and not others Sheila quickly dropped her weight delighting in the results. She then reveals that she and Troy are married again pleasantly surprising Diana. She reports that Troy is a good man, a good stepfather having gained her children's love and respect, and with God makes her happier than she ever has been before.

Troy returns from a run to find Trina alone working out. Uncomfortable Troy tries to leave as Trina begins to aggressively flirt with and seduce him. He informs her he is having none it and pushes her away in full view of Sheila and Diana thus Troy proves his faithfulness without knowing. Sheila then expresses her intent to harm Trina who backs off while Troy and Diana go to the kitchen to start cooking. Sheila walks over to Trina who feigns innocence but Sheila is clearly not buying it.

Sheila reminds Trina of how very good of a friend she had been having protecting Trina from violence, the streets, and even the law at separate times. Trina, unable to deny any of it begins to look uncomfortable, and tries to blow it off when Sheila forgives her. Sheila then threatens to kill her should Trina ever approach Troy again. Terry and Mike return reporting that the boat ride cannot happen because of heavy rain.

Diana asks that they follow tradition and tell their 'why did i get married' stories and despite Mike's objections Terry begins. Terry and Diana share a sweet reminiscence about their reason prompting Poppy to tease he married Terry's mother for the benefits. Troy reveals he married Sheila because she was able to overcome her pain for him and she because he was everything Mike was not. Mike passes.

The couples separate and Troy checks with Sheila that she is not too upset by Mike's presence as Diana is not the only one who despises Sheila's ex. He then reminds Sheila how very much he loves her. The two make love that night and the next morning everyone prepares to leave. Mike expresses his disappointment with Trina banishing her to the car. Mike seems interested in helping with his kids by offering the first payment of any kind which Sheila refuses.

Sheila confronts Mike about his actions refusing Mike's attempts to restart their relationship. She sends him a way angry and as Mike passes Troy, her new husband reminds Mike that he has this and then Troy and Sheila kiss. Poppy expresses his approval of the couple.

Poppy gathers Troy, Sheila, Diana, and Terry to talk to them as Mike and Trina leave without even saying goodbye. Poppy wishes them well and hopes for happiness in their lives and reminds them that God is the answer to everything. They leave followed by Poppy and the play ends.

== Tour dates ==
Scheduled shows
Date	City	Venue
October 2, 2003	Atlanta	Atlanta Civic Center
October 3, 2003	Atlanta	Atlanta Civic Center
October 4, 2003	Atlanta	Atlanta Civic Center
October 5, 2003	Atlanta	Atlanta Civic Center
October 7, 2003	Detroit	Music Hall Center for the Performing Arts
October 8, 2003	Detroit	Music Hall Center for the Performing Arts
October 9, 2003	Detroit	Music Hall Center for the Performing Arts
October 10, 2003	Detroit	Music Hall Center for the Performing Arts
October 11, 2003	Detroit	Music Hall Center for the Performing Arts
October 12, 2003	Detroit	Music Hall Center for the Performing Arts
October 21, 2003	Philadelphia	Merriam Theater
October 22, 2003	Philadelphia	Merriam Theater
October 23, 2003	Philadelphia	Merriam Theater
October 24, 2003	Philadelphia	Merriam Theater
October 25, 2003	Philadelphia	Merriam Theater
October 26, 2003	Philadelphia	Merriam Theater
November 7, 2003	Richmond	Landmark Theater
November 8, 2003	Richmond	Landmark Theater
November 9, 2003	Richmond	Landmark Theater
November 11, 2003	Dallas	Bruton Theatre
November 12, 2003	Dallas	Bruton Theatre
November 13, 2003	Dallas	Bruton Theatre
November 14, 2003	Dallas	Bruton Theatre
November 15, 2003	Dallas	Bruton Theatre
November 16, 2003	Dallas	Bruton Theatre
November 18, 2003	Houston	Verizon Wireless Theater
November 19, 2003	Houston	Verizon Wireless Theater
November 20, 2003	Houston	Verizon Wireless Theater
November 21, 2003	Houston	Verizon Wireless Theater
November 22, 2003	Houston	Verizon Wireless Theater
November 23, 2003	Houston	Verizon Wireless Theater
January 6, 2004	Philadelphia	Merriam Theater
January 7, 2004	Philadelphia	Merriam Theater
January 8, 2004	Philadelphia	Merriam Theater
January 9, 2004	Philadelphia	Merriam Theater
January 10, 2004	Philadelphia	Merriam Theater
January 11, 2004	Philadelphia	Merriam Theater
January 13, 2004	Columbus	Palace Theatre
January 14, 2004	Columbus	Palace Theatre
January 15, 2004	Cleveland	State Theatre
January 16, 2004	Cleveland	State Theatre
January 17, 2004	Cleveland	State Theatre
January 18, 2004	Cleveland	State Theatre
January 20, 2004	Detroit	Music Hall Center for the Performing Arts
January 21, 2004	Detroit	Music Hall Center for the Performing Arts
January 22, 2004	Detroit	Music Hall Center for the Performing Arts
January 23, 2004	Detroit	Music Hall Center for the Performing Arts
January 24, 2004	Detroit	Music Hall Center for the Performing Arts
January 25, 2004	Detroit	Music Hall Center for the Performing Arts
February 3, 2004	Chicago	Arie Crown Theater
February 4, 2004	Chicago	Arie Crown Theater
February 5, 2004	Chicago	Arie Crown Theater
February 6, 2004	Chicago	Arie Crown Theater
February 7, 2004	Chicago	Arie Crown Theater
February 9, 2004	Chicago	Arie Crown Theater
February 10, 2004	Chicago	Arie Crown Theater
February 12, 2004	Columbia	Township Auditorium
February 13, 2004	Columbia	Township Auditorium
February 14, 2004	Columbia	Township Auditorium
February 15, 2004	Columbia	Township Auditorium
February 17, 2004	New York City	Beacon Theatre
February 18, 2004	New York City	Beacon Theatre
February 19, 2004	New York City	Beacon Theatre
February 20, 2004	New York City	Beacon Theatre
February 21, 2004	New York City	Beacon Theatre
February 22, 2004	New York City	Beacon Theatre
February 24, 2004	Newark	Newark Symphony Hall
February 25, 2004	Newark	Newark Symphony Hall
February 26, 2004	Newark	Newark Symphony Hall
February 27, 2004	Newark	Newark Symphony Hall
February 28, 2004	Newark	Newark Symphony Hall
February 29, 2004	Newark	Newark Symphony Hall
March 2, 2004	Tulsa	Brady Theater
March 3, 2004	Tulsa	Brady Theater
March 4, 2004	St. Louis	Fox Theatre
March 5, 2004	St. Louis	Fox Theatre
March 6, 2004	St. Louis	Fox Theatre
March 7, 2004	St. Louis	Fox Theatre
March 16, 2004	Baltimore	Murphy Fine Arts Center
March 17, 2004	Baltimore	Murphy Fine Arts Center
March 18, 2004	Baltimore	Murphy Fine Arts Center
March 19, 2004	Baltimore	Murphy Fine Arts Center
March 20, 2004	Baltimore	Murphy Fine Arts Center
March 21, 2004	Baltimore	Murphy Fine Arts Center
March 30, 2004	New Orleans	Saenger Theatre
March 31, 2004	New Orleans	Saenger Theatre
April 1, 2004	New Orleans	Saenger Theatre
April 2, 2004	New Orleans	Saenger Theatre
April 3, 2004	New Orleans	Saenger Theatre
April 4, 2004	New Orleans	Saenger Theatre
April 6, 2004	Washington, D.C.	Warner Theatre
April 7, 2004	Washington, D.C.	Warner Theatre
April 8, 2004	Washington, D.C.	Warner Theatre
April 9, 2004	Washington, D.C.	Warner Theatre
April 10, 2004	Washington, D.C.	Warner Theatre
April 11, 2004	Washington, D.C.	Warner Theatre
April 13, 2004	Washington, D.C.	Warner Theatre
April 14, 2004	Washington, D.C.	Warner Theatre
April 15, 2004	Washington, D.C.	Warner Theatre
April 16, 2004	Washington, D.C.	Warner Theatre
April 17, 2004	Washington, D.C.	Warner Theatre
April 18, 2004	Washington, D.C.	Warner Theatre
April 21, 2004	Los Angeles	Kodak Theatre
April 22, 2004	Los Angeles	Kodak Theatre
April 23, 2004	Los Angeles	Kodak Theatre
April 24, 2004	Los Angeles	Kodak Theatre
April 25, 2004	Los Angeles	Kodak Theatre
April 27, 2004	Sacramento	Memorial Auditorium
April 28, 2004	Sacramento	Memorial Auditorium
April 29, 2004	Oakland	Paramount Theatre
April 30, 2004	Oakland	Paramount Theatre
May 1, 2004	Oakland	Paramount Theatre
May 2, 2004	Oakland	Paramount Theatre
May 5, 2004	New York City	Beacon Theatre
May 6, 2004	New York City	Beacon Theatre
May 7, 2004	New York City	Beacon Theatre
May 8, 2004	New York City	Beacon Theatre
May 9, 2004	New York City	Beacon Theatre
September 14, 2004	Tampa	Tampa Bay Performing Arts Center
September 15, 2004	Tampa	Tampa Bay Performing Arts Center
September 16, 2004	Tampa	Tampa Bay Performing Arts Center
October 9, 2004	Austin	Frank Erwin Center
October 10, 2004	Austin	Frank Erwin Center
October 19, 2004	Greenville	Bi-Lo Center
October 20, 2004	Greenville	Bi-Lo Center
October 22, 2004	Nashville	Nashville Municipal Auditorium
October 23, 2004	Nashville	Nashville Municipal Auditorium
October 24, 2004	Nashville	Nashville Municipal Auditorium
October 26, 2004	Louisville	Louisville Palace
October 27, 2004	Louisville	Louisville Palace
October 29, 2004	Jackson	Mississippi Coliseum
October 30, 2004	Jackson	Mississippi Coliseum
October 31, 2004	Little Rock	Barton Coliseum
November 2, 2004	Newark	Patriots Theater
November 3, 2004	Newark	Patriots Theater
November 4, 2004	Newark	Patriots Theater
November 5, 2004	Newark	Patriots Theater
November 6, 2004	Hampton	Hampton Coliseum
November 7, 2004	Hampton	Hampton Coliseum
November 9, 2004	Jacksonville	Times-Union Center for the Performing Arts
November 10, 2004	Jacksonville	Times-Union Center for the Performing Arts
November 11, 2004	Jacksonville	Times-Union Center for the Performing Arts
November 12, 2004	Orlando	Orange County Convention Center
November 13, 2004	Orlando	Orange County Convention Center
November 14, 2004	Orlando	Orange County Convention Center
November 15, 2004	Tampa	St. Pete Times Forum
November 16, 2004	Tampa	St. Pete Times Forum
November 18, 2004	Miami	James L. Knight Center
November 19, 2004	Miami	James L. Knight Center
November 20, 2004	Miami	James L. Knight Center
November 21, 2004	Miami	James L. Knight Center
December 15, 2005	Atlanta	Ferst Center for the Arts
December 16, 2005	Atlanta	Ferst Center for the Arts
December 17, 2005	Atlanta	Ferst Center for the Arts
December 18, 2005	Atlanta	Ferst Center for the Arts

== Cast ==
=== 2003 Original Cast ===
- Sheila - Kelly Price
- Poppy - LaVan Davis
- Diane - Donna Stewart
- Mike - Carl Pertile
- Troy - Chico DeBarge
- Terry - Curtis Von
- Trina - Chrystale Wilson
- Janice - Beverly Faulks

=== 2005 DVD Cast ===
- Sheila - Cheryl Pepsii Riley
- Poppy - LaVan Davis
- Diane - Donna Stewart
- Mike - Cordelle Moore
- Terry - Greg Stewart
- Troy - Anthony "Tony" Grant
- Trina - Demetria McKinney
- Janice - Beverly Faulks

== Musicians ==
- Ronnie Garrett - Musical Director / Bass Guitar
- Earl Flemming - Keyboards
- Anthony Lockett - Guitar
- Marcus Williams - Drums
- Michael Burton - Saxophone / Keyboards
- Crystal "Chrissy" Collins - Background Vocals
- Beverly Faulks - Background Vocals

== Musical Numbers ==
=== 2003 Production ===
- "Why Did I Get Married" - Sheila (Promo CD)
- "We Learned" – Diane
- "So Insane" – Terry
- "You Should Have Told Me" - Sheila (Promo CD)
- "Glad to Be on That Number" – Company
- "Healing For My Soul" - Sheila (Promo CD)
- "Friend of Mine" – Sheila
- "A Prayer" – Poppy
- "Priceless (Interlude)" - Sheila (Promo CD)
- "He Proposed" – Sheila
- "You For Me" – Troy
- "How Does It Feel (Married Your Girl)" - Sheila (Promo CD)
- "He Is God" – Poppy and Company

=== 2005 Taped Performance ===
All songs written and/or produced by Tyler Perry.

- "We Learned" – Diane
- "So Insane" – Terry
- "Glad to Be on That Number" – Company
- "More Than Just A Sin" – Sheila
- "A Prayer" – Poppy
- "Keep Your Head Up" – Sheila
- "You For Me" – Troy
- "He Is God" – Poppy and Company

== Trivia ==
- After an incident during tour in 2003, Chico DeBarge left the show and Cordelle Moore assumed the role. Johnny Gill would also play the role on tour.
- Sonya Evans and Chantell D. Christopher both portrayed the role of Trina on tour.
- D'Wayne Gardner, who played Horace from Madea's Class Reunion, also portrayed the role of Mike on tour.
- Original 2005 performance song, "Keep Your Head Up", would later be recorded by Chaka Khan as the opening credits song for "Madea's Family Reunion."
- "You For Me" would also be performed by Johnny Gill in "Madea's Family Reunion."

== Film adaptation ==
The stage play was adapted into a motion picture by Lionsgate Home Entertainment which opened in theaters on October 12, 2007.
