= Larry Gaye: Renegade Male Flight Attendant =

2015 American comedy film about a renegade male flight attendant

- Theatrical release poster
- Directed by: Sam Friedlander
- Written by: Mike Sikowitz
- Produced by: Michael Roiff; Ted Kroeber; Mark Feuerstein; Sam Friedlander
- Starring: Mark Feuerstein; Danny Pudi; Jayma Mays; Patrick Warburton; Rebecca Romijn
- Cinematography: Elisha Christian
- Edited by: Sam Restivo
- Music by: Michael Cohen
- Production companies: Night and Day Pictures
- Distributed by: Orion Pictures; Metro-Goldwyn-Mayer Pictures
- Release date: June 5, 2015 (United States)
- Running time: 99 minutes
- Country: United States
- Language: English
- Box office: $71,021 (worldwide)

Larry Gaye: Renegade Male Flight Attendant is a 2015 American comedy film. It stars Mark Feuerstein, Danny Pudi, Jayma Mays, Patrick Warburton and Rebecca Romijn, and was directed by Sam Friedlander and written by Mike Sikowitz. The film concerns a flight attendant who discovers that the airline company he is working for is trying to slash costs by having human flight attendants replaced with robots. It was Friedlander's feature film debut as director.

The film was given a limited release in selected theaters, and was also made public on video on demand on June 5, 2015. Larry Gaye: Renegade Male Flight Attendant was developed by Night and Day Pictures and obtained by Metro-Goldwyn-Mayer and Orion Pictures for distribution.

== Plot summary ==
During a board meeting at Federated Airlines headquarters in Atlanta, Emily McCoy introduces "Sally the Flightpal," a humanoid robot, as a solution to eliminating human flight attendants and by extension, eliminate their rising salaries and benefits. McCoy then tells the board members that Sally was made by Techtronics Industries. McCoy adds that for a fraction of the costs of a human flight attendant, Federated Airlines could have every one of its planes fully staffed by Flightpals within one year.

When the CEO of Federated Airlines, Stanley Warner casts his doubts over whether Sally is better than their own flight attendants, the president and founder of Techtronics Industries, Bob Techtronics walks in. Techtronics comes up with the solution of allowing Sally to compete against Federated Airlines' single best flight attendant in a challenge of skills. At an assembly meeting for the Fraternal Association of Federated Airlines Flight Attendants (or FAFAFA), the union's president announces Larry Gaye has been selected by the research committee as the one to go up against Sally in a performance test.

At the Federated Airlines Testing Center in hangar 26, Sally competes against Larry Gaye in a race around queue lines. They also compete to see who can serve the better cup of coffee as well as singled-handedly carry a tray of drinks while walking across a mechanical balance board. Sally later defeats Larry in hurdles over luggage and in a boxing match. For the final event, Sally and Larry must offer passengers a choice of dinner between barbecue chicken and pasta primavera. But as a customer service problem, the airplane is out of pasta and a more disgusting, non-edible entrée as an alternative. Larry eventually gives up when he couldn't think of any other possibly disgusting alternative. Therefore, Sally is declared the winner of the competition by a score of 61 points to zero.

Larry and his friend and co-worker Nathan Vignes soon deduces that Sally was able to virtually know his every move due to Isabella, a woman who seduced him and shared his secrets with. On Larry and Nathan's next assignment for Federated Airlines, Flight 37 to Buenos Aires, they spot Sally now in full flight attendant uniform helping passengers put their luggage in the overhead aircraft bin.

While assisting Captain Bryce and Captain Felder in the cockpit after the airplane's fuel line is blown, Larry learns that the signals are crossed with the Flightpal, thus he is unable to stay in contact with ground control's radio.

Larry then attacks what he initially presumes to be Sally from behind with a service trolley. Nathan immediately informs Larry that he mistakenly attacked someone else only for Sally to enter the scene from behind. After Sally asks Larry if she could help him, Larry response by lifting the bottom of her blouse to reveal a red button in the place of her navel. Larry presses the button to open up her access panel. It is there, where Larry presses down a switch on the side of the motherboard to shut the Flightpal off.

== Cast ==
- Mark Feuerstein as Larry Gaye
- Danny Pudi as Nathan Vignes
- Jayma Mays as April Farnekowski
- Patrick Warburton as Captain Bryce
- Rebecca Romijn as Sally the Flightpal
- Stanley Tucci as Publishing Executive
- Henry Winkler as Stanley Warner
- Marcia Gay Harden as President of the FAFAFA
- Molly Shannon as Emily McCoy
- Taye Diggs as Rasta Cab Driver
- Ian Gomez as Captain Felder
- Griffin Gluck as Donnie
- Bob Gunton as Flight School Instructor
- Jessica Lowndes as Suzanne
- Leslie Coutterand as Isabella
- Adam Shapiro as Bob Techtronics
- Rosanna Arquette as TV Anchorwoman
- Jason Alexander as Larry's Dad
- Richard Riehle as Bartender
- Anthony Ruivivar as Flight School Administrator
- Michael B. Silver as Charles Geddes
- Guy Wilson as Rhodes Scholar
- Tonya Kay as Helsinki
- Christopher Fitzgerald as Curtis
- John Yuan as Stuart Nevins
- Jere Burns as Herb Thompkins
- Eric Stoltz as Russ Peterson

== Production ==
The project was first announced in November 2012, with Mike Sikowitz penning the screenplay. Mark Feuerstein and Stanley Tucci were the first to join the cast. Feurstein loved Sikowitz's script so much that he shepherded the project to the point of pre-production. Director Sam Friedlander added that his collaboration with Feurstein and Sikowitz was a real homegrown effort. He added how exciting and empowering it was to put something together outside of the traditional model. That according to Friedlander, gave them a lot of creative breathing room.

On March 8, 2013, it was announced that Jessica Lowndes, Jayma Mays and Rebecca Romijn were included to the cast. Stella Angelova was Rebecca Romijn's stunt double.

Filming commenced in 2013 in Los Angeles, California.

Mark Feuerstein told Danielle Solzman of the website Hidden Remote that his character, Larry Gaye, is the guy that's going to save all the other flight attendants from a robot flight attendant, played by Rebecca Romijn, who threatens to replace all of them.

In an interview with Rama Screen, Feuerstein when asked about going from playing a doctor on the TV series Royal Pains to playing a flight attendant "It’s very different to be on the set of a comedy where you’re looking to turn things as ridiculous as possible as opposed to a medical drama, where we’re trying to be as realistic and accurate as possible. But it was so fun to be on a set where on my first day of shooting, instead of trying to figure out how to perform an accurate rendition of a tracheotomy, I’m wearing a strap-on in a bathing suit because I have an erection from Rebecca Romijn who plays a robot flight attendant.”

== Release and reception ==
The film received a limited theatrical release in the United Arab Emirates and Russia, earning a worldwide box office gross of $71,021. It was made available on video on demand on June 5, 2015.

The film received mostly negative reviews. Jason Best of What's on TV wrote, "Larry Gaye: Renegade Male Flight Attendant is striving to recapture the deadpan silliness of classic 1980 spoof Airplane! Unsurprisingly, the jokes don’t fly nearly as fast here..." but added that the film occasionally had genuinely funny moments. Jeffrey Anderson of Common Sense Media criticized the film for being a "lowbrow comedy filled with sex scenes, innuendo, and crude jokes (including far too many based on the title character's last name)" and gave it one out of five stars.
