= Meet the Browns (TV series) =

American sitcom (2009–2011)

- Genre: Sitcom
- Created by: Tyler Perry
- Based on: Meet the Browns by Tyler Perry
- Directed by: Tyler Perry; Kim Fields; Alfonso Ribeiro; Chip Fields; Mark Swinton; Roger M. Bobb
- Starring: David Mann; Tamela Mann; Lamman Rucker; Denise Boutte; Tony Vaughn; Juanita Jennings; Gunnar Washington; Logan Browning; Terri J. Vaughn; K Callan; Antonio Jaramillo; Arielle Vandenberg; Brianne Gould; Jeannette Sousa; Robert Ri'chard
- Country of origin: United States
- Original language: English
- No. of seasons: 5
- No. of episodes: 140 (list of episodes)

Production
- Executive producers: Tyler Perry; Roger M. Bobb
- Production locations: Decatur, Georgia (setting); Atlanta, Georgia (taping location)
- Camera setup: Multi-camera
- Running time: 22 minutes
- Production companies: Tyler Perry Studios; Georgia Media

Original release
- Network: TBS
- Release: January 7, 2009 – November 18, 2011

Related
- House of Payne; Assisted Living

Meet the Browns is an American sitcom created and produced by Tyler Perry. The initial story revolves around Mr. Brown running a nursing home in Decatur, Georgia with his daughter Cora Simmons. However, as the show progresses, this idea is gradually phased out and it becomes a typical family sitcom about a multigenerational clan living under one roof. The show premiered on Wednesday, January 7, 2009, and finished its run on November 18, 2011 on TBS.

It is an adaptation of Perry’s play and film of the same name. The show stars David Mann and Tamela Mann, who starred in the stage play and motion picture. It is also a spin-off of Tyler Perry's House of Payne.

== Production history ==
As season 2 began, Brianne Gould, who played Brianna, was removed from the series for undisclosed reasons. She was replaced by Logan Browning.

In the series, Eddie Walker, one of Will's former friends, who was close to molesting Joaquin, became the first on-screen character to die. He suffered stab wounds, and the surgery done to try to save his life was performed by Will himself. After Eddie's death, Mr. Brown would make jokes to his nephew Will about killing him. Also, in season 6, Brianna's friend Antonio is killed in a car crash involving texting while driving, making him the second on-screen character to die.

David Mann is the only cast member who appears in every episode.

Mabel "Madea" Simmons, a recurring character in many of Tyler Perry's works, is mentioned many times by Mr. Brown, including when he says Madea needs her throat checked for an Adam's apple, looking like a dude/man, and being to big with sausage fingers. Throughout the show's seven seasons, she never makes an on-camera appearance.

Other unseen characters include Brown's brother and sister-in-law, L.B. and Sarah. Both appeared in the stage play and film adaptation of Meet the Browns, but they've never graced the series, although L.B. was mentioned once in the backdoor pilot episode which aired as an episode of House of Payne. Joe, Madea's brother is mentioned in the camping episode when Will ask Mr.Brown what's he going to burn, some grass. Mr.Brown mockingly says to Will the only people that burns grass is your mama and Uncle Joe.

In November 2011, TBS suddenly announced that the series finale would be airing since the show had been canceled. Following its announcement, the last two episodes aired, ending the series after 140 episodes.

In February 2020, it was announced that David Mann and Tamela Mann would be reprising their roles in a sequel series titled Tyler Perry's Assisted Living which premiered on September 2, 2020, on BET. Assisted Living takes place years after the events of Meet the Browns. Brown and Cora act as investors for another retirement home, owned by a family that belongs to Brown’s church. It's unknown about what happened to, Will, Sasha, Brianna, Joaquin, the Colonel, Edna, Renee, and Derek.

== Episodes ==
| Season | Episodes | Originally released | |
| Season | Episodes | First released | Last released |
|---|---|---|---|
| 1 | 10 | January 7, 2009 | February 4, 2009 |
| 2 | 26 | May 27, 2009 | September 16, 2009 |
| 3 | 42 | November 4, 2009 | June 9, 2010 |
| 4 | 54 | June 16, 2010 | December 22, 2010 |
| 5 | 8 | October 28, 2011 | November 18, 2011 |

== Cast and characters ==
=== Main characters ===
The show revolves around the misadventures of the multi-generational Brown family of suburban Atlanta, Georgia. All main cast members are credited only for the episodes in which they appear.

- David Mann as Leroy S. Brown. The show's main protagonist, Mr. Brown is a church deacon who's very proud of being saved. He has one brother, Larry "L.B." Brown, who is never mentioned in the series but appears in the film, and one sister, Vera. He was married years ago, but his wife died; in the original Tyler Perry plays, they had a daughter, but the character was never mentioned in the films and only shown in the play "Madea's Family Reunion". In "Madea's Class Reunion" he learns that he has a daughter, Cora Simmons, the result of a prom-night escapade with Mabel "Madea" Simmons. Over-bright in his funky dress sense, Brown isn't mentally brilliant and has the wise-guy role, making fun of characters like Edna and Reggie, but he is a nice, caring, giving man. He works part-time as a hospital janitor and also as a school enforcement officer who once beat up a teacher whom he thought had done something wrong. He is adequate at karate and enjoys busting out his "Kangaroo" move, His catchphrases include "Stop being nasty!", "What the what?" and "The Devil is a lie!" Running gags involve Brown calling Edna different kinds of animals like a horse, dog, bats, reptiles. He also calls her a zombie and a vampire or other monsters, and/or calling her a dude or a man and mentioning her by having a mustache or beard. He also makes fun of Cora's fiancé Reggie's weight and personality, and otherwise being open about his dislike for this future son-in-law. In one episode Brown begins to deal with his diabetes. Although he has used many variations of what the middle initial "S" of his name stands for like style, sweet, etc, one episode reveals that his middle name is Sacajawea (which he pronounces sah-kuh-JAW-wee-uh). In the Madea's Big Happy Family movie, Brown discovers that he is not Cora's father through a paternity test on Maury. The reveal is not brought up in the last season of the show following the movie, but it is brought up again years later in Tyler Perry's Assisted Living, in which Mr. Brown mentions the "Maury" show events and assumes that the Grandpa Vinny character is the father when he claims that he had an affair with Madea during the time of Cora's conception.
- Tamela Mann as Cora Jean Simmons-Brown, Brown's daughter with Madea. She is a teacher and a praying woman who is very active in her church, but when angered, she shows aspects of her mother, Madea. A childless widow, she later becomes engaged to Reggie Brooks, the football coach at her school who lives with his mother, Thelma (In the play and movie, Cora had two adult daughters). "Meet the Candlelight Dinner" reveals that she is allergic to laxatives; the episode "Meet the Attraction" reveals that she's afraid of mannequins and test dummies. In Seasons 3 and 4, she dates Reggie and Gordon and eventually chooses Reggie over Gordon. Her age is never flat-out revealed in the series; she comes closest to blurting it out in "Meet the Big Wedding" ("Mr. Brown, I am" [covers mouth] "years old!"). But she's probably around in her 40s. In the TV series' continuity, Cora has known for many years that Mr. Brown is her father, and he often references raising and being there for her; in the Madea's Big Happy Family movie, Madea claims that Mr. Brown has given her $18 in child support: $1-per-year from her birth to age 18. In the episode "Meet the Baby Daddy", a man claimed to be Cora's father, but it was revealed that Mr. Brown was Cora's father after all. But then it was discovered that Cora was not Brown's daughter after appearing on Maury in Madea's Big Happy Family.
- Lamman Rucker as William "Will" Brown, MD. Will is Brown's nephew, a doctor who loves his uncle so much that he provides free medical services to the retirement-home residents. He and his wife Sasha have become adoptive parents to Brianna and Joaquin Ortiz. Will never met his father; Vera, his alcoholic mother, met his father while she was drunk. A running gag starting in the middle of season 3 is Mr.Brown hilariously mentioning to Will about killing his patient Eddie Walker, Joaquin's former baseball coach and almost molester.
- Denise Boutte as Sasha Brown (née Bohem-Brown), RN. Will's wife is a nurse who decides to work for Brown, helping to look after the retirement-home residents. Sasha and Will start their family by adopting Brianna and Joaquin Ortiz. In an episode in season 3, Sasha becomes pregnant, then miscarries in season 4. She is also very good at giving advice.
- Tony Vaughn as Colonel Cleophus Jackson. The Colonel is a former military man who still lives as if he's in the military. His motto is "Shoot now, ask questions later." He's a very disciplined, very formal, very official man, but underneath that hard exterior is a soft heart. His wife died several years ago, and he's estranged from their only child, daughter Karen, after she put him in a retirement home but forgives her and talks to her again. He takes up with Edna Barnes. In Season 3 they move out of Brown Meadows to a house down the street and propose to her. In the beginning of season 4, he and Edna almost got married in a big wedding event but unfortunately the Colonel got a heart attack just as Edna appears in chapel room. He finally weds Edna in a quickie wedding in Season 5.
- Juanita Jennings as Edna Wright Barnes Grey Foster Jackson. 65/68 year-old childless widow Edna has always wanted to be a singer but has never pursued this dream. Most of her close friends and relatives have passed. She's extremely in touch with her sexuality; she can relate everything to sex, and she acts like the "60s" is the new 40. In Season 3, she and her fiancé, the Colonel, move down the street from Brown Meadows after the Colonel proposed to her. A running gag involves Brown comparing Edna to various animals, monsters, and a man and/or a dude with facial or chest hairs. She finally weds the Colonel in Season 5. In the series pilot, she had a crush on Brown, telling him to come to bed with her and showing him her full body naked.
- Brianne Gould (Season 1)/Logan Browning (Season 2–5) as Brianna Janae Ortiz-Brown, a foster child who comes from a broken home and an unsafe foster environment. At age 15/16, she knows the foster care system too well. She's very bright but has anger problems that stem from her tragic childhood. The only relationship she nurtures is with her brother Joaquin, feeling like they are alone together in the world. She sometimes gives Sasha and Will a hard time about sneaking into parties or concerts, taking birth control pills to have sex, stealing expensive shoes but learns her lessons yet still love each other as a mother and daughter.
- Gunnar Washington as Joaquin Ortiz-Brown, Brianna's 8/9-year-old brother. The siblings are veterans of the foster-care system, so Joaquin in particular is very anxious to find a good home and feel settled. He and Brianna have their moments of discord, but mainly they look after each other. Overall, he just wants to be loved.
- Terri J. Vaughn as Renee LaToya Smith. A nurse at the hospital where Will, Sasha, Brown, and Derek work. She is a close friend and confidante to Sasha, despite the two constantly butting heads at work. She considers herself as half-ghetto. Renee was a recurring character in Season 3 who became a regular in Season 4. She claims to have four kids and seven baby daddies. She also treats the hospital patients unfairly in a comedic gag.
- K Callan as Daisy LaRue. Daisy is a former B-movie actress and "legend in her own mind" who really misses her career. She has made a lot of money but she's frugal. Whenever someone tries to talk to her about money or anything else she doesn't want to discuss, she "goes into character" to avoid the conversation. She often acts like she believes she is in Manhattan or Los Angeles, etc., rather than Brown Meadows in suburban Atlanta. She never married because she could never find anyone like her high-school crush, but she has dated widely. In season 3, she moved to Palm Beach, Florida with her cousin Lorraine (the late Rue McClanahan) after she realized that she had Alzheimer's disease, but she made a trip back to attend Edna and Colonel's Season 5 wedding.
- Antonio Jaramillo as Jesus Hernandez, a Mexican handyman who worked at Brown Meadows to save up for law school. He first appears in the second episode of season 1 when Mr.Brown interviews with him but had a hard time understanding his name thinking Jesus sneezed and thinking he called Mr.Brown a sissy but was saying si si which means yes yes in Spanish. In the middle of Season 3, Brown fired him to save money. When he comes back in Season 5 for Edna and Colonel's wedding, he claims that he has become a lawyer and is doing well. He has a love/hate relationship with London.
- Arielle Vandenberg as London Sheraton, a very privileged celebrity who is famous for absolutely no reason. She has no clue about hard work, but after racking up several DUI, she must do community service at Brown Meadows. She appears dim but at times she shows almost startling intelligence. In Season 2, her dad forces her to move after her probation, but she occasionally visits Brown Meadows, like for Edna and Colonel's Season 5 wedding. She is similar to the character London Tipton from the Disney Channel show The Suite Life of Zack & Cody; both Londons are portrayed as dumb, both are heiresses, and both depend on their unseen-but-mentioned fathers; both characters are loose parodies of real-life Hilton Worldwide heiress Paris Hilton).
- Jeannette Sousa as Carmen Martinez; she is Brianna and Joaquin's social worker and Sasha's good friend, and appears primarily in season 1 but is never seen or mentioned again starting in season 2.
- Maestro Harrell as Antonio, Brianna's boyfriend from the foster home, introduced in season 4 when Brianna introduces him to Will and Sasha but Will didn't like his appearance and attitude at first especially when he catches him and Brianna kissing in the backyard at night . In season 6, he dies from organ failure after being injured in a car wreck texting while driving to a party in the episode "Meet The Big Payoff". He was able to make it to the hospital for treatment believing his injuries to be minor, but things quickly took a turn for the worse. Antonio mentions that his mom is in prison and haven't seen his dad since he was 5. In "Meet The Big Payoff" it's possible that he lived with foster parents after the tragic news of his death at the hospital.

=== Recurring characters ===
- Robert Ri'chard as Derek Porter (seasons 3–7), an African-Dominican American frat student who lives next door to Brown Meadows and often helps out there, in between masterminding or participating in Brown's antics. First appears in season 3 till season 7.
- Jenifer Lewis as Vera Brown, Mr. Brown's younger sister, Will's mother, and Sasha's mother in law. She appears to be an alcoholic through her life since she had Will. She doesn't really know who Will's father is and had a love interest with Sasha's father in one episode.
- Tasha Smith as Tanya Ortiz, Joaquin and Brianna's biological mother. She is the recurring antagonist. She got out of jail and tried to get Brianna and Joaquin back just to get checks.
- Lisa Arrindell Anderson as Karen Jackson, The Colonel's daughter, estranged from her father after putting him in a nursing home after her mother's death. They still get along afterwards. She also appears in the Colonel's and Edna's wedding episode.
- Ciara Wilson as Simone Taylor, Brianna's best friend. She appears to be dimwitted and dizzy as well. She got pregnant around season 4 after Will and Sasha found out that the pregnancy test was hers, not Brianna.
- Courtney Gray as Jamal, Brianna's male best friend. In one episode, he innocently touches Brianna's hand which makes her overreact and kicks him out of the house. Another episode is that we find out he and his mom are homeless and living in a van which he breaks into people's homes including the Brown resident only to steal food.
- Bernard Jones as Milo, a student at Cora's school. He later appeared in Tyler Perry's House of Payne as a college student and friend of Malik.
- Leland L. Jones as Gordon Bob, Cora's ex-love-interest from college and the principal at her school. One episode in season 4, he sets up by sending Cora to Dallas for the teaching job.
- Maurice G. Smith as Reggie Brooks, Cora's on-and-off boyfriend, the school's football coach. Mr.Brown has a strong dislike to Reggie due to his personality and the fact that he still lives with his mom, even though Cora still lives with her dad, Mr.Brown. Reggie is being called names by Mr.Brown like fatty, puffy, or other fat jokes/names.
- Laura Hayes as Mrs. Thelma Brooks, Reggie's mother. Mr. Brown also insults her like Edna but she always thinking he's hitting on her.
- Bill Bellamy as Anthony, Renee's on-and-off boyfriend and Will's best friend, who works as a nurse.
- Njema Williams as Benny, a local bum who is usually hustling with (or against) Brown.

== Home releases ==
Lionsgate Home Entertainment has released all five seasons on DVD in Region 1. But these are arranged differently than the TV broadcast in which the DVD releases make up seven seasons with twenty episodes each.

| DVD title | Ep # | Release date |
|---|---|---|
| Tyler Perry's Meet the Browns – Season 1 | 1–20 | August 30, 2011 |
| Tyler Perry's Meet the Browns – Season 2 | 21–40 | October 4, 2011 |
| Tyler Perry's Meet the Browns – Season 3 | 41–60 | November 22, 2011 |
| Tyler Perry's Meet the Browns – Season 4 | 61–80 | January 24, 2012 |
| Tyler Perry's Meet the Browns – Season 5 | 81–100 | April 17, 2012 |
| Tyler Perry's Meet the Browns – Season 6 | 101–120 | June 26, 2012 |
| Tyler Perry's Meet the Browns – Season 7 | 121–140 | October 23, 2012 |

== Ratings ==
When the series premiered on January 7, 2009, it received a viewership of 4,027,000 based on Nielsen ratings. Meet the Browns was TBS's #1 sitcom in March 2010, with 2.3 million viewers and 1.2 million adults 18-49. In October 2010, the show continued to be TBS's #1 and #2 sitcom telecasts, with an audience of 1.2 to 1.4 million adults 18–49.

== Syndication ==
Meet the Browns began airing in off-network syndication in September 2010 on stations covering more than 70% of the U.S., with major station groups carrying the program including Fox Television Stations, Tribune Broadcasting, Weigel Broadcasting, CBS Television Stations, Capitol Broadcasting Company, Cox Media Group, Meredith Corporation, Granite Broadcasting, Belo Broadcasting. and CW Plus, Reruns are primarily aired on affiliates of MyNetworkTV and The CW (the latter network's CW Plus service also carries the program as part of its national schedule). BET began airing reruns of the series in October 2016.
