= Service to Man =

American drama film

- Film poster
- Directed by: Aaron Greer; Seth Panitch
- Written by: Seth Panitch
- Starring: Morgan Auld; Christopher Livingston; Lamman Rucker; Keith David
- Music by: Tom Wolfe
- Release date: October 16, 2016 (Tallgrass)
- Country: United States
- Language: English

Service to Man is a 2016 American drama film directed by Aaron Greer and Seth Panitch and starring Morgan Auld, Christopher Livingston, Lamman Rucker, and Keith David.

== Cast ==
- Keith David
- Morgan Auld as Eli
- Christopher Livingston as Michael
- Sydney Morton
- Nathan James
- Tim Ross
- Michael Pantozzi
- George Thagard
- Willie Williams
- Eric Marable Jr.
- Chris Bellinger
- Jay Jurden
- Lamman Rucker

== Production ==
The film was shot in Tuscaloosa, Alabama. Filming wrapped in June 2015.

== Release ==
The film was screened at the Wichita Scottish Rite Center as part of the Tallgrass Film Festival on October 16, 2016.

== Reception ==
Barbara Shulgasser-Parker of Common Sense Media awarded the film three stars out of five.
