= Denise Boutte =

American actress and model

- Born: Maurice, Louisiana, U.S.
- Occupation: Actress
- Years active: 2004–present

Denise Boutte is an American actress. She made her film debut starring in the 2004 horror feature Death Valley: The Revenge of Bloody Bill and in 2007 appeared in the comedy-drama Why Did I Get Married?. On television, Boutte was a regular cast member on the TBS sitcom Meet the Browns (2009–2011).

== Life and career ==
Boutte was born in Maurice, Louisiana and graduated from the Louisiana State University. She later moved to Dallas, Texas and began modeling career appearing in commercials for brands including Frito-Lay, Pampers, Fossil and Mary Kay Cosmetics. The same time she made her feature film debut starring in the zombie-horror film Death Valley: The Revenge of Bloody Bill produced by The Asylum. She later starred in the horror film Way of the Vampire (2005) also produced by The Asylum, and the drama film Restraining Order (2006) starring Robin Givens. She made her stage debut starring as Rachel Robinson in the 2005 Fremont Theater's production of National Pastime. She appeared in episodes of the television series Noah's Arc, Cuts, Everybody Hates Chris and Girlfriends, before playing a recurring role of Danielle Calder on the NBC daytime soap opera, Days of Our Lives during the summer of 2007.

In 2007, Boutte starred in the comedy-drama film Why Did I Get Married? by Tyler Perry. She later starred in his sitcom Meet the Browns as Sasha Brown from 2009 to 2011.In 2010 she had a major role in the 2010 drama film N-Secure alongside Essence Atkins, Lamman Rucker, Tempest Bledsoe, Nephew Tommy, and more. Since then, Boutte starred in a number of television films, mostly for Lifetime, LMN, TV One and Hallmark Channel, such as Between Sisters (2013), Where's the Love? (2014), For the Love of Ruth (2015), A Rich Christmas (2021), The Missing (2022), Game of Deceit (2023) and A Mother's Intuition (2023). In 2017 she starred alongside Penny Johnson Jerald and Brian J. White in the TV One pilot Media and had recurring role during the second season of horror series Stan Against Evil. She appeared in the romantic comedy film The Bounce Back (2016), the thriller film Secrets (2017), the drama film The Choir Director (2018) and the romantic comedy Couples' Night (2018). She played the leading roles in the 2018 drama film Her Only Choice and the 2021 romantic comedy-drama film Never and Again.

On television, Boutte starred in the Urban Movie Channel police drama series, Bronx SIU from 2018 to 2019. She had the recurring role as Raven Sinclair in the BET+ crime drama series The Family Business from 2021 to 2022 and starred in the second season of the horror-anthology series Terror Lake Drive in 2022. Also in 2022, Boutte temporarily replaced Leigh-Ann Rose in the role of Imani Benedict in the CBS daytime soap opera, The Young And The Restless.

== Filmography ==
=== Film ===
Year	Title	Role	Notes
2004	Death Valley: The Revenge of Bloody Bill	Mandy	
2004	A Killer Within	Hitchhiker	
2005	Way of the Vampire	Arianna	
2005	Black Leather Soles	Charlotte	Short
2006	Restraining Order	Aunt Dee	
2006	Behind the Smile	Lady at Piano	
2006	Only in Your Dreams	Andrea	Short
2006	Pieces of Eight	Brianna Douglas	
2006	Nola	Nola	
2007	Splitting Hairs	News Reporter	Short
2007	Sister's Keeper	Diane	
2007	Why Did I Get Married?	Trina	
2008	Extreme Movie	New Tabitha	
2008	15 Minutes of Fame	Candy	
2010	N-Secure	Tina Simpson	
2012	To Love and to Cherish	Aliyah	Television film
2012	What She Wants for Christmas	Marilyn	
2013	Between Sisters	Morgan	Television film
2013	Dear Secret Santa	Gayle	Television film
2014	For Love or Money	Tina	
2014	Where's the Love?	Ryan	Television film
2015	Touched	Tracey	
2015	For the Love of Ruth	Ruth	
2015	Charlotte	Catherine	Short
2016	Second Sight	Tamara	Television film
2016	The Bounce Back	Julie	
2017	Media	Danielle Jones	Television film
2017	Secrets	Victoria Campbell	
2018	The Choir Director	Simone Wilcox	
2018	Couples' Night	Sherry	
2018	Her Only Choice	Tasha	
2020	Kombucha Cure	Gabriela	
2021	Never and Again	Jasmine Washington	
2021	Before I'm Dead	Diane	
2021	#Unknown	DA Helen Friar	
2021	A Rich Christmas	Lauryn Smith	
2021	Christmas with My Ex	Alicia	
2022	The Missing	Raina Sidner	Television film
2023	Napa Ever After	Cassandra	Television film

=== Television ===
Year	Title	Role	Notes
2004–05	Days of Our Lives	Hostess, Wedding Planner	2 episodes
2006	Noah's Arc	Clerk of Court	Episode: "Got 'til It's Gone"
2006	Cuts	Lisa	Episode: "Black Don't Crack"
2006	Everybody Hates Chris	Mrs. Johnson	Episode: "Everybody Hates Valentine's Day"
2006	Boston Legal	Reporter #6	Episode: "BL: Los Angeles"
2006	Happy Hour	Kit	Episode: "Boo! This Party Sucks"
2006	Girlfriends	Waitress	Episode: "Just Joan"
2007	Notes from the Underbelly	Sharice	Episode: "Pilot"
2007	Days of Our Lives	Danielle Calder	Regular cast
2009–11	Meet the Browns	Sasha Brown	Main cast
2012	Key & Peele	Wife	Episode: "Episode #2.3"
2013–22	Young Justice	Rocket, Lynn Stewart-Pierce, Captain Celestia, Faora, Highfather Avia (voice)	Guest: season 2, recurring cast: seasons 3–4
2017	Stan Against Evil	Lara Bouchard	Recurring cast: Season 2
2018–19	Bronx SIU	Jasmine	Main cast
2021–22	The Family Business	Raven Sinclair	Recurring cast: Season 3-4
2022	Terror Lake Drive	Deputy Mayor	Recurring cast: Season 2
2022	The Young and the Restless	Imani Benedict	Regular cast
2025	The Family Business: New Orleans	Raven Sinclair	
