= Lamman Rucker =

American actor (b. 1971)

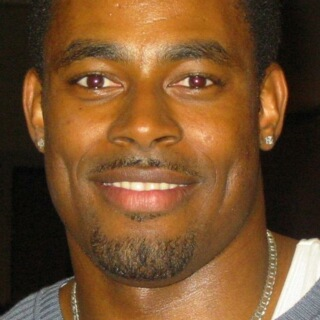
- Rucker in 2009
- Born: October 6, 1971 (age 54); Pittsburgh, Pennsylvania, U.S.
- Occupation: Actor
- Years active: 1998–present
- Height: 6 ft 3 in (191 cm)
- Spouse: Kelly Davis Rucker

Lamman Rucker (born October 6, 1971) is an American actor. Rucker began his career on the daytime soap operas As the World Turns and All My Children, before roles in The Temptations and Tyler Perry's Why Did I Get Married? and Why Did I Get Married Too?. He played Will Brown in the 2008 film Meet the Browns and its television adaptation. In 2016, he began starring as Jacob Greenleaf in the Oprah Winfrey Network drama series, Greenleaf. As of 2022, he stars in the BET+ drama series The Black Hamptons.

== Early life ==
Rucker was born in Pittsburgh, Pennsylvania, the son of Malaya (née Ray) and Eric Rucker. He has partial ancestry from Barbados. Rucker spent his formative years in the greater Washington, DC, Maryland area. He developed an interest in acting after he was placed in several child pageants. His first acting role was a portrayal of Martin Luther King in the 4th grade. He joined the drama club in 7th grade and attended high school at the Duke Ellington School of the Arts in Washington, D.C. Rucker then studied at Carnegie-Mellon University and Duquesne University.

== Career ==
Rucker has appeared in a number of short films and television movies. His first major acting role came in 2002 when he assumed the role of attorney T. Marshall Travers on the CBS daytime soap opera As the World Turns opposite Tamara Tunie. He left the series the following year and portrayed Garret Williams on ABC soap opera All My Children in 2005. During this time, he also had recurring roles on the UPN sitcoms All of Us and Half & Half.

Rucker is best known for his co-starring roles in the Tyler Perry films Why Did I Get Married? (2007) and Why Did I Get Married Too? (2010). He played Will Brown in Perry's 2008 film Meet The Browns, and later had a starring role on the television series of the same name, reprising his role as Will from 2009 to 2011. In 2012, Rucker was cast as the male lead opposite Anne Heche in the NBC comedy series Save Me, but left after the pilot episode. He later starred opposite Mena Suvari in the short-lived WE tv drama series, South of Hell.

In 2015, Rucker was cast as one of the leads in the Oprah Winfrey Network drama series, Greenleaf. For five seasons, he played Jacob Greenleaf, the only son of Bishop James Greenleaf (Keith David) and his wife, First Lady Daisy Mae Greenleaf (Lynn Whitfield).

On August 29, 2019, he shared personal life experiences that he credits for his success with the Hampton University football team.

== Filmography ==
=== Film ===
Year	Title	Role	
2002	Brown Sugar	Guy on Couch at Hot97	
2003	Making Revolution	Michael Suliman	
2005	Redirect	Bobby	Short
2006	Let's Talk	Maurice	Short
2007	The Commission	Judge Harold Couch	Short
2007	I'm Through with White Girls	Drake Moore	
2007	Why Did I Get Married?	Sheriff Troy	
2008	Meet the Browns	Will Brown	
2008	Ball Don't Lie	Trey	
2009	Jump the Broom: A Musical	Shamar	Short
2009	Words Unspoken	Vaughn	
2009	The Greatest Song	Trent Major	Also producer
2010	Why Did I Get Married Too?	Sheriff Troy	
2010	N-Secure	Isaac Roberts	
2011	The Bachelor Party	Lance	Video
2012	Sugar Mommas	Jason	TV movie
2012	The Undershepherd	Roland	
2014	Black Coffee	Hill	
2014	Where's the Love?	Sebastian	TV movie
2014	First Impression	Vernon Richardson	Also producer
2015	The Man in 3B	Darryl Graham	
2015	Love Won't Let Me Wait	Roger	
2016	Service to Man	Dr. Johnson	
2016	Plenty	William Foster	TV movie
2018	Sinners Wanted	Elder Roberts	
2018	No More Mr Nice Guy	Bruce Wright	
2018	Falling in Love Again	Lamont	
2018	First Impression	Vernon Richardson	TV movie and also producer
2020	The Sin Choice	-	
2020	Cooking Up Christmas	Donovon Jackson	Also co-executive producer
2021	Bad Dad Rehab: The Next Session	Mr. Arnold	TV movie
2022	Voices	Dr. Nero	Short
2023	Under His Influence	Ernest	

=== Television ===
Year	Title	Role	Notes
1998	The Young and the Restless	Flight Agent #3	Episode: "Episode #1.6295"
1998	The Temptations	Jimmy Ruffin	Episode: "Episode #1.1 & #1.2"
2002-03	As the World Turns	T. Marshall Travers	Regular Cast
2004	All of Us	Rick Harris	Recurring cast: season 2
2005	Law & Order	Reggie Uggams	Episode: "The Sixth Man"
2005	All My Children	Garret Williams	Regular Cast
2005-06	Half & Half	Chase	Recurring cast: season 4
2007	House of Payne	William "Will" Brown	Episode: "Weeping May Endure for a Night"
2009-11	Meet the Browns	William "Will" Brown	Main cast
2011	Single Ladies	Teddy	Episode: "Confidence Games"
2013	Save Me	Dr. John Wilkins	TV series
2015	South of Hell	Elijah Bledsoe	Main cast
2016-20	Greenleaf	Pastor Jacob Greenleaf	Main cast
2020	Terror Lake Drive	Gerrod	Main cast: season 1
2022	The Black Hamptons	Anthony Johnson	Main cast
2022	Queen Sugar	Vince	Recurring cast: season 7

== Award nominations ==
Year	Award	Category	Work	Result
2010	NAACP Image Awards	NAACP Image Award for Outstanding Supporting Actor in a Comedy Series	"Meet the Browns"	Nominated
2011	NAACP Image Awards	NAACP Image Award for Outstanding Supporting Actor in a Comedy Series	"Meet the Browns"	Nominated
