= Why Did I Get Married? =

- Theatrical release poster
- Directed by: Tyler Perry
- Written by: Tyler Perry
- Based on: Why Did I Get Married? by Tyler Perry
- Produced by: Tyler Perry; Reuben Cannon
- Starring: Tyler Perry; Janet Jackson; Jill Scott; Malik Yoba; Richard T. Jones; Michael Jai White; Lamman Rucker; Sharon Leal; Tasha Smith; Denise Boutte; Lamman Rucker
- Cinematography: Toyomichi Kurita
- Edited by: Maysie Hoy
- Music by: Aaron Zigman
- Production companies: Tyler Perry Studios; Reuben Cannon Productions
- Distributed by: Lionsgate
- Release date: October 12, 2007
- Running time: 113 minutes
- Country: United States
- Language: English
- Budget: $15 million
- Box office: $55.9 million

Why Did I Get Married? is a 2007 American comedy-drama film adaptation written, produced, directed, and starring Tyler Perry. The film also stars Janet Jackson, Jill Scott, Malik Yoba, Sharon Leal, Tasha Smith, Michael Jai White, Richard T. Jones, Denise Boutte, and Keesha Sharp. The film was released in the United States by Lionsgate on October 12, 2007. Inspired by Perry's play of the same name, the film explores the difficulties of maintaining a solid relationship in the modern times through the lives of four married couples and college friends that experience upheaval on a week-long retreat.

The film received mixed reviews and was moderately successful with audiences. The success of the film launched a franchise, including a sequel, Why Did I Get Married Too? in 2010, and a television spinoff which premiered in 2011.

== Plot ==
Four couples, who are also best friends since college, converge in a house in the mountains for a week-long retreat.

- The first couple, attorney Dianne and pediatrician Terry, argue a lot because Dianne refuses to stop working. She takes calls on her phone instead of talking with Terry.
- The second couple consists of hair salon owner Angela and former pro football player Marcus. Angela constantly argues with Marcus and anyone who interrupts them.
- The third couple is housewife Sheila and entrepreneur Mike. Sheila has to get off the plane taking them there because of her weight and the requirement to purchase two seats while Mike continues flirting on the flight with her single friend, Trina.
- The fourth couple consists of psychologist Patricia and architect Gavin.

After everyone finds out what happened to Sheila, the other wives berate Mike for letting her drive alone. However, he shows disregard for her and disparages her weight.

Providence leads Sheila to Sheriff Troy Jackson's office. Due to the weather, the roads are closed for the night and she has to spend the night in the office. That night, Angela catches Mike going to Trina's bedroom. Sheila arrives at the retreat house the following morning with Troy in tow. She introduces Troy to the others, revealing that she invited him to breakfast. During breakfast, the couples argue, as usual.

During an argument at dinner, Angela exposes Mike and Trina's affair. In turn, Mike reveals the other couples' hidden secrets: Marcus contracted VD after cheating on Angela, Dianne had her tubes tied after her daughter was born without Terry's knowledge, Terry got a DNA test on his and Diane’s daughter because he was unsure he was the father, and Gavin criticized Patricia for not protecting their young son in a fatal car accident a year prior. Angela admits giving Marcus the STD from her own cheating. Enraged, he tries choking her while the others pull him away. Mike says that he wants a divorce, and Sheila smashes a bottle over his head, knocking him out.

Sheila checks into a hotel to recover from her divorce and discovers that Mike drained her bank account. She is distraught when Troy visits her. He takes her up to a mountain where she cries and mourns the loss of her love.

The other couples head back home. Eventually, Patricia breaks down and confesses to Gavin that she was only trying to be perfect. They agree to face the situation and reconcile. Angela and Marcus are still fighting, especially when Marcus' ex-girlfriend and baby mama, Keisha, shows up at the salon, and disrespects Angela. This happens again when the couple arrives at her house for the kids. Marcus eventually stands up to both women and frightens Angela into realizing she is wrecking their life with her constant arguing by disappearing for days. On Terry's birthday at their home, Dianne accuses him of wanting her to be a housewife, while he calls her out for neglecting him and their daughter. He moves out, feeling that Dianne constantly prioritizes her career over them. Patricia meets up with Dianne and Angela, moping over their husbands, and gives them counseling about the need to get back on track: making a list of the good and bad things their husbands have done.

In the mountains, Sheila settles into her new life with a new job at the general store owned by Troy's father. Angela cooks dinner for Marcus after finishing with her list. Although he suspects she is trying to poison him at first, they reunite and set new conditions. Dianne begs Terry to come back home after crying over her list. They reconcile as well.

The couples later converge at a gala celebration for an award received by Patricia. She, Dianne, and Angela are elated when Sheila arrives, re-introduces Troy as her new husband, and says that she lost weight with his help. Although Mike is still with Trina, he tries to weasel his way back into Sheila's good graces, but she turns him down. Patricia encloses a confession of her love for Gavin and a message of loving, respecting, and trusting God in her acceptance speech.

== Cast ==
- Tyler Perry as Dr. Terry Brock, a pediatrician
- Sharon Leal as Dianne Brock, an attorney
- Malik Yoba as Gavin Agnew, an architect
- Janet Jackson as Dr. Patricia Agnew, a psychologist
- Michael Jai White as Marcus Williams, a former professional football player
- Tasha Smith as Angela Williams, a hair salon owner
- Richard T. Jones as Mike, an entrepreneur
- Jill Scott as Sheila Jackson, a housewife
- Lamman Rucker as Troy Jackson, the local sheriff
- Denise Boutte as Trina
- Keesha Sharp as Pam
- Kaira Whitehead as Keisha

== Production and development ==
The film was shot in the state of Georgia and the province of British Columbia in Canada. In Georgia, scenes were shot in Decatur at Agnes Scott College along with parts spent in Atlanta. In Canada, scenes were shot in the city of Vancouver, Pemberton and Whistler.

Perry decided to take out many of the church and message scenes because he wanted the film to be "on a whole 'nother spiritual level--there's a whole 'nother connection to it." He said his writing has improved since the play.

Perry invited experienced and neophyte African-American actors to a reading of an early script in order to field reactions, including Danny! and Tracee Ellis Ross.

== Reception ==
=== Critical response ===
Review aggregation website Rotten Tomatoes gives the film a score of 49% based on 41 reviews. The website's critics consensus reads: "Despite some poignant observations on modern marriages, Why Did I Get Married? is too preachy and melodramatic." On Metacritic, the film had an average score of 54/100 based on reviews from 12 critics. CinemaScore polls reported that the average grade moviegoers gave the film was an "A+" on an A+ to F scale.

Paul Grenada said that while "there are times where the script seems stiff,...[the film] teaches without hammering, and you leave the movie feeling good about what you saw." Giving the movie a B−, Entertainment Weekly said that Perry is of the "spell-everything-in-capital-letters and act-it-out-loudly schools," but added that "one performance glistens--Jill Scott's as the sad, heavyset Sheila, who locates the faith that's the source of love." Time magazine gave the film a B and called it the "usual artless mix of broad comedy, teary confessions and spiritual uplift."

=== Box office ===
In its opening weekend, the film grossed $21.4 million in 3,105 theaters in the United States and Canada, ranking #1 at the box office. In its second weekend, the film slipped to #2 in the box office charts, with a gross of $12.1 million, bringing the 10-day total to over $38 million. In total, the film domestically grossed $55,862,886.

== Soundtrack ==
The soundtrack was released by Atlantic Records on October 2, 2007. Neither Janet Jackson nor Jill Scott are featured on the soundtrack. The soundtrack debuted at number 51 on Billboard 200, number seven on R&B/Hip-Hop Albums and number six on Soundtracks with 58,000 copies sold in first week.

1. Keith Sweat feat. Keyshia Cole – "Love U Better"
2. Babyface – "Sorry for the Stupid Things"
3. Anita Baker – "You Belong to Me"
4. Kelly Price – "Why"
5. Gerald Levert feat. Jaheim – "DJ Don't Remix"
6. Musiq Soulchild – "Betterman"
7. Tyrese Gibson – "One"
8. Hope – "Who Am I To Say"
9. Beyoncé – "Flaws and All"
10. Laura Izibor – "Mmm..."
11. Amel Larrieux – "No One Else"
12. Tamika Scott – "Why Did I Get Married"
13. Michael Bublé – "L-O-V-E"
14. Jennifer Holliday – "Givin' Up"

== Home media ==
The film was released on DVD on February 12, 2008 and on Blu-ray on November 23, 2010.

== Awards and nominations ==
- NAACP Image Awards
  - Outstanding Motion Picture (Nominated)
  - Outstanding Actress in a Motion Picture: Jill Scott (Nominated)
  - Outstanding Supporting Actor in a Motion Picture: Tyler Perry (Nominated)
  - Outstanding Supporting Actress in a Motion Picture: Janet Jackson (Winner)

== Sequels and TV series ==
A sequel, titled Why Did I Get Married Too? starring Perry and the original cast, was released on April 2, 2010.

Subsequently, Perry created a comedy-drama television series based upon the two films titled Tyler Perry's For Better or Worse. The series, which stars White and Smith as Marcus and Angela, premiered on TBS on November 25, 2011.

In June 2021, Perry entertained the idea of revisiting the franchise with a film called Why Did I Get Married Again; the sequel was confirmed in a slate announcement made by Netflix in January 2026. The film officially released on Netflix on September 9, 2026.
