= Logan Browning =

American actress (born 1989)

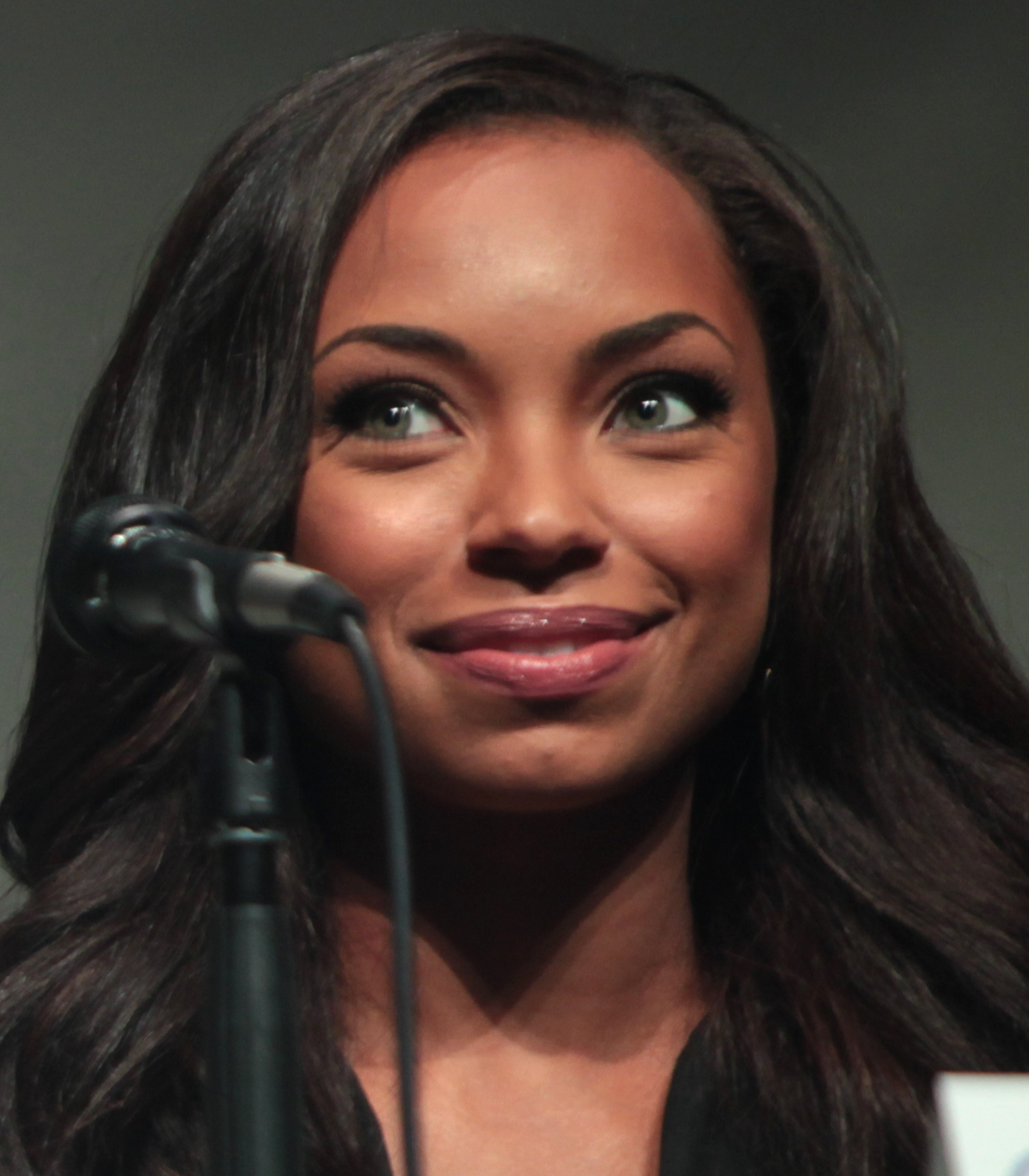
- Browning at WonderCon 2015
- Born: Logan Laurice Browning; June 9, 1989 (age 37); Atlanta, Georgia, U.S.
- Occupation: Actress
- Years active: 2004–present

Logan Laurice Browning (born June 9, 1989) is an American actress. She first gained larger notability for starring as Samantha White in the 2017 Netflix satirical-drama series Dear White People. She is also known for playing Sasha in the 2007 film Bratz: The Movie, Brianna Brown in Meet the Browns, Jelena Howard on the VH1 series Hit the Floor, and Zora in the PlayStation Network series Powers.

== Early life ==
Browning was born in Atlanta, Georgia. Her biological mother is white and her biological father is black. Her adoptive father is mixed race and her adoptive mother is black. Growing up, she did a lot of activities, from dancing for a local ballet company to cheerleading in junior high. She attended Vanderbilt University in Nashville, Tennessee.

== Career ==
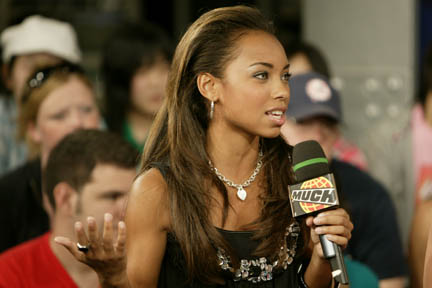
Logan Browning while promoting the 2007 film Bratz: The Movie

In 2003, Browning studied acting from a young age by taking classes at Barbizon Modeling and Acting School in Atlanta. She made her acting debut in the teen series Summerland as the character Carrie, and played Vanessa in the Nickelodeon series Ned's Declassified School Survival Guide in 2005–06. She also appeared as the main love interest in Dijon Talton's video for the song "Wild Out".

In 2007, Browning starred as one of the main characters, Sasha, in the live-action theatrical feature Bratz: The Movie, based on the popular fashion doll line.

Browning joined the cast of Meet the Browns during the second season, replacing Brianne Gould as the character Brianna Ortiz. She makes a brief appearance in Prima J's "Rockstar" music video, as well as B5's music video "U Got Me". Browning had a recurring role on the Disney XD series Pair of Kings.

She appeared in two episodes of The Secret Circle, a TV series based on the novels of the same name by L.J. Smith. In April 2012, Browning was cast as Jelena Howard in VH1's Hit the Floor. Before "Hit the Floor", Browning was not a professional dancer. She was cast for her acting ability and trained for 8 months before the series filming.

Browning starred alongside her Hit the Floor co-star, Katherine Bailess, in the YouTube comedic series Shit Southern Women Say. In July 2016, it was announced that Browning would star in the role of Samantha White in the Netflix satirical-drama series Dear White People. In 2017, Browning was cast in the role of Lizzie in Netflix horror film The Perfection. The film was released on May 24, 2019.

In 2026, Browning starred as FBI agent Sarah Greer in I Will Find You, opposite Chi McBride and Sam Worthington. “I Will Find You” is a television miniseries made for streaming service Netflix, apartes from the 2023 novel of the same name by Harlan Coben.

== Filmography ==
Film
Year	Title	Role	Notes
2007	Bratz: The Movie	Sasha	
2013	Breaking at the Edge	Sara	
2015	Brotherly Love	Trina	
2019	The Perfection	Elizabeth "Lizzie" Wells	

Television
Year	Title	Role	Notes
2004–2005	Summerland	Carrie	4 episodes
2005–2006	Ned's Declassified School Survival Guide	Vanessa	5 episodes
2009–2011	Meet the Browns	Brianna Brown	Main role (Seasons 2–5); 106 episodes
2010–2013	Pair of Kings	Rebecca Dawson	6 episodes
2011	The Secret Circle	Sally Matthews	Episodes: "Bound" and "Loner"
2013–2018	Hit the Floor	Jelena Howard	Main role (Seasons 1–4); 33 episodes
2014	Tyler Perry's For Better or Worse	Shawn	2 episodes
2015	Powers	Zora	10 episodes
2016	Survivor's Remorse	Trina	Guest star
2017–2021	Dear White People	Samantha White	Main cast
2018	RuPaul's Drag Race	Herself, Guest Judge	Season 10 Episode 4: "The Last Ball on Earth"
2021	Young Justice: Phantoms	Onyx (voice)	4 episodes
2022	The Proud Family: Louder and Prouder	College Penny Proud (voice)	Episode: "When You Wish Upon a Roker"
2025	Harlem (TV series)	Portia	5 episodes
TBA	Criminal	Jenny	
2026	I Will Find You	Agent Sarah Greer	Main cast (8 episodes)
