= Death Valley: The Revenge of Bloody Bill =

- Directed by: Byron Werner
- Screenplay by: Matthew Yuan; John Yuan
- Produced by: Rick Walker; David Michael Latt; David Romano; Sherri Strain; Chanda Fuller
- Cinematography: Byron Werner
- Edited by: David Michael Latt; Leigh Slawner
- Music by: Ralph Rieckermann
- Distributed by: The Asylum
- Release date: October 26, 2004
- Running time: 88 minutes
- Country: United States
- Language: English

Death Valley: The Revenge of Bloody Bill is a 2004 zombie-western slasher film released by The Asylum. Unlike many of the later efforts by The Asylum, this movie is not a mockbuster. The film follows a group of people trying to survive while stranded in Sunset Valley, a desert ghost town inhabited by the murderous spirit of Confederate war criminal, William T. Anderson and his horde of zombies.

== Plot ==
Cocaine dealer, Darrell, leads a cop on a chase through the desert. She follows him until he throws his brick of cocaine out the window which bursts open on her windshield. Darrel's car breaks down though and he is forced to walk. He comes across “Sunset Valley-population 99”, a ghost town that suddenly materializes out of nowhere. He stops in the saloon and is attacked by a zombie bartender. Running outside, he finds the town populated with zombies that chase him until he runs into Bloody Bill, who rips out his throat.

A debate team consisting of Gwen, Mandy, Sondra, Buck, Jerry and their coach Avery embark on a trip to tournament in Phoenix when they are carjacked by Earl, Darrell's “business” partner. He is searching for Darrell and holds everyone in the van at gunpoint until they arrive at Sunset Valley—the population sign now at 100. They search the empty buildings when an undead Darrell appears and warns Earl that Bloody Bill is coming before he fully zombifies and attacks Jerry before being shot by Earl. Bill and his zombies descend on the town and Sondra runs off on her own, encountering a young girl zombie. She follows the girl into a house where several zombies are eating human body parts. She tries escaping but is attacked and eaten; the population sign reads 101.

The others take refuge in a house and Jerry tells them the legend of Bloody Bill Anderson: a Confederate war criminal on the run from the Union who was brutally executed by the people of Sunset Valley for his crimes, though not before Bill could make a deal with the Devil grating him supernatural powers. They hear Sondra's cry's outside and upon investigating, find her mutilated body. Buck panics and runs off on his own and Avery fights Earl, wrestling a gun from him when the zombies attack, forcing them to fight together. Mandy, Gwen and Jerry are separated and go off on their own. Buck runs in circles, with every direction he takes leading back to Sunset Valley. He encounters Sandra and other zombies with Bill, who walks up and crushes his skull in his bare hands and the population sign increases to 102.

Mandy, Gwen, and Jerry take refuge in another house where they find a picture of Mary Anderson (who bears a striking resemblance to Gwen), with a note to Bill on the back. Jerry explains Mary was Bill's younger sister who was hanged by the people of Sunset Valley due to her family ties to Bill and he retaliated by attacking the town. Jerry starts showing delusions and succumbing to his zombie bite. Earl and Avery burst join them and the group resolves to get Jerry to a hospital but Gwen worries about Buck. When Avery opens the door, Bloody Bill stabs him with his rapier and his zombies flood into the house. The remaining four run upstairs and barricade themselves in a room with furniture when Jerry fully zombifies and attacks Earl. Gwen shoots Jerry and Earl, realizing he will zombify, offers to stay behind while the girls escape. He loads up on the last of his cocaine as the zombies break through the barricade. He shoots many of them before encountering Bill. He begins choking Earl, who has a single grenade with him and pulls the pin, dropping it at their feet. It goes off as Gwen and Mandy run away and the population sign inexplicably shows 106, despite only 3 more lives being taken (Avery, Jerry and Earl).

Mandy and Gwen are confronted seemingly by Earl, dressed in Bill's clothes. He pulls out Bill's rapier and stabs Mandy as Earl's removed face falls off Bill's face. Bill chases Gwen who runs but finds herself always returning to the town. The zombies chase her to the church, where Bill keeps a shrine to Mary. It's then that Gwen gets the idea to impersonate Mary, and is able to grab Bill's rapier while hugging him. She uses the sword to decapitate Bill, killing all his zombies in the process. As she is leaving, the town population sign has once again, inexplicably increased, now at 107.

== Cast ==
- Chelsea Jean as Gwen / Mary Anderson
- Jeremy Bouvet as Bloody Bill Anderson
- Denise Boutte as Mandy
- Matt Marraccini as Jerry
- Kandis Erickson as Sondra
- Gregory Bastien as Earl
- Scott Carson as Avery
- Steven Glinn as Buck
- Dean N. Arevalo as Darrell

== Production ==
The Film had an estimated budget of $750,000 This was the first in house movie produced by the Asylum.

== Reception ==
The film received very mixed retrospective reviews.
