= 44th GMA Dove Awards =

2013 US music awards ceremony

- Date: October 15, 2013
- Location: Nashville
- Hosted by: Amy Grant & Kirk Franklin
- Website: http://www.doveawards.com

Television/radio coverage
- Network: UP (October 21, 2013)

The 44th Annual GMA Dove Awards presentation ceremony was held on Tuesday, October 15, 2013, at the Allen Arena. It returned to Nashville, Tennessee after being away for two years. The ceremony recognized the accomplishments of musicians and other figures within the Christian music industry since the previous ceremony in April 2012. The ceremony was produced by the Gospel Music Association and was hosted by singers Kirk Franklin and Amy Grant. The awards show was broadcast on the UP television network on October 21, 2013.

== Performers ==
Artist(s)	Song(s)
TobyMac and Diverse City; Britt Nicole	"Eye on It"
Jason Crabb; Jay DeMarcus	"Love is Stronger"
Trip Lee; KB; Andy Mineo	"One Sixteen"
Tasha Cobbs	"Break Every Chain"
Daily and Vincent; Ernie Haase & Signature Sound; The Isaacs; Bill Gaither and The Gaither Vocal Band	Tribute to Bill Gaither "He Touched Me" "Alpha And Omega"
The Passion Band; Kristian Stanfill; Brian and Jenn Johnson	"One Thing Remains"
Rhett Walker Band	"When Mercy Found Me"
Bart Millard; Amy Grant	"If I Could See (What the Angels See)"
Colton Dixon	"Never Gone"
Big Daddy Weave	"Redeemed"
Capital Kings	"I Feel So Alive"
Tamela Mann	"Take Me to the King"
For King & Country	"Fix My Eyes"
Michael W. Smith; Newsboys	Tribute to Billy Graham "Just as I Am" "We Believe"
NEEDTOBREATHE	"Difference Maker" "Keep Your Eyes Open"

== Presenters and introducers ==
- Brandon Heath / Mandisa
- Montell Jordan / Jaci Velasquez / David Mann
- Julie Bulloch / Rusty Bulloch / Britt Nicole
- Dr. Louie Giglio
- Rick Warren / Joyce Meyer
- Francesca Battistelli
- Jamie Grace / Chris August
- Amy Grant
- LeCrae / Bart Millard
- Blanca Callahan from Group 1 Crew / Isaac Carree from Men of Standard
- Kari Jobe / Candace Cameron Bure
- Michael W. Smith
- Jason Crabb / Jon Foreman of Switchfoot

== Winners ==
Song of the Year

- "10,000 Reasons (Bless the Lord)"
  - (performer) Matt Redman; (writers) Matt Redman & Jonas Myrin; (publishers) ThankYou Music, Sixsteps Music, WorshipTogether.com, Said and Done Music, and Shout! Publishing

Songwriter of the Year

- Matt Redman

Contemporary Christian Performance of the Year

- "10,000 Reasons (Bless the Lord)"
  - Matt Redman for EMI Records; Nathan Nockels

Southern Gospel Performance of the Year

- "What the Blood is For"
  - Jason Crabb for Gaither Music Group; Wayne Haun

Gospel Performance of the Year

- "Break Every Chain"
  - Tasha Cobbs for EMI Records; VaShawn Mitchell

Artist of the Year

- TobyMac

New Artist of the Year

- For King & Country

Producer of the Year

- Ed Cash

Rap/Hip Hop Recorded Song of the Year

- "Tell The World"
  - (performers) Lecrae ft. Mali Music; (writers) Lecrae Moore, Kortney Pollard, Torrance “Street Symphony” Esmond, Charles Dunlap, Lincoln Morris

Rock Recorded Song of the Year

- "Sick of It"
  - (performer) Skillet; (writers) John L. Cooper, Scott Stevens

Rock/Contemporary Recorded Song of the Year

- "Keep Your Eyes Open"
  - (performer) NEEDTOBREATHE; (writers) Bear Rinehart, Bo Rinehart

Pop/Contemporary Recorded Song of the Year

- "10,000 Reasons (Bless the Lord)"
  - (performer) Matt Redman; (writers) Matt Redman, Jonas Myrin

Inspirational Recorded Song of the Year

- "Satisfied"
  - Jason Crabb, Tony Wood, Ronnie Freeman

Southern Gospel Recorded Song of the Year

- "What The Blood Is For"
  - Jason Crabb, Ronnie Freeman, Tony Wood

Bluegrass Recorded Song of the Year

- "He Washed My Soul"
  - (performer) The Little Roy & Lizzy Show; (writers) Wayne Haun, Jamie Helms, Ruby Moody, Ron Haun

Country Recorded Song of the Year

- "From My Rags To His Riches"
  - (performers) Devin McGlamery with Dailey & Vincent; (writers) Ernie Haase, Wayne Haun, Joel Lindsey

Contemporary Gospel/Urban Recorded Song of the Year

- "Break Every Chain"
  - (performer) Tasha Cobbs; (writer) William Reagan

Traditional Gospel Recorded Song of the Year

- "Take Me to the King"
  - (performer) Tamela Mann; (writer) Kirk Franklin

Worship Song of the Year

- "10,000 Reasons (Bless the Lord)"
  - (performer) Matt Redman; (writers) Matt Redman & Jonas Myrin; (publishers) ThankYou Music, Sixsteps Music, WorshipTogether.com, Said and Done Music, and Shout! Publishing

Rap/Hip Hop Album of the Year

- Gravity
  - (performer) Lecrae; (producers) Heat Academy, Joseph Prielozny, J.R., The Watchmen, Dru Castro, Uforo Ebong, Tyshane, DJ Official, Rudy Currence

Rock Album of the Year

- Release the Panic
  - (performer) RED; (producer) Howard Benson

Rock/Contemporary Album of the Year

- A Messenger
  - (performer) Colton Dixon; (producers) Adam Watts, Andy Dodd, Gannin Arnold, David Garcia

Pop/Contemporary Album of the Year

- Eye on It
  - (performer) TobyMac; (producers) David Garcia, Toby McKeehan, Christopher Stevens, Jamie Moore, Telemitry

Inspirational Album of the Year

- Love is Stronger
  - (performer) Jason Crabb; (producers) Jay DeMarcus, Ed Cash, Wayne Haun

Southern Gospel Album of the Year (TIED)

- Pure and Simple
  - (performer) Gaither Vocal Band; (producers) Bill Gaither, Ben Isaacs, Michael English, David Phelps
- Canton Junction
  - Michael Sykes, Aaron Crabb

Bluegrass Album of the Year

- The Gospel Side of Dailey & Vincent
  - Darrin Vincent, Jamie Dailey

Country Album of the Year

- Eyes Wide Open
  - (performer) Jeff & Sheri Easter; (producers) Jeff & Sheri Easter, Greg Cole, Madison Easter

Contemporary Gospel/Urban Album of the Year

- Grace
  - (performer) Tasha Cobbs; (producers) VaShawn Mitchell; Vaughan Phoenix

Traditional Gospel Album of the Year

- Best Days
  - (performer) Tamela Mann; (producers) Myron Butler, David Mann, Tamela Mann

Instrumental Album of the Year

- Glory
  - (performer) Michael W. Smith; (producers) David Hamilton, Michael W. Smith

Children's Music Album of the Year

- Look Up
  - Gateway Next; Josh Alltop

Spanish Language Album of the Year

- Global Project Espanol
  - Hillsong; Andrew Crawford, Steve McPherson, Toni Romero

Special Event Album of the Year

- Passion: Let The Future Begin
  - Chris Tomlin, Kristian Stanfill, Matt Redman, Brett Younker, Kari Jobe, Crowder, Christy Nockels

Christmas Album of the Year

- JOY
  - Steven Curtis Chapman; (producers) Brent Milligan, Steven Curtis Chapman

Praise and Worship Album of the Year

- Burning Lights
  - (performer) Chris Tomlin; (producers) Jason Ingram, Ed Cash, Dan Muckala

Musical of the Year

- Christ The Redeemer
  - Joel Lindsey, Jeff Bumgardner, Daniel Simpson; Daniel Semsen

Youth/Children's Musical of the Year

- Blast Off!
  - Celeste Clydesdale, David T. Clydesdale

Choral Collection of the Year

- A Merry Clydesdale Christmas
  - David T. Clydesdale

Recorded Music Packaging

- Eye on It
  - Jan Cook; Eddy Boer, Sarah Sung; Wendy Palau; Lee Steffen; Boerhaus

Short Form Music Video of the Year

- "Eye on It"
  - TobyMac ft. Britt Nicole; Eric Welch

Long Form Music Video of the Year

- Hillsong UNITED: Live in Miami
  - Andrew Crawford, Joel Houston, Had Gillies

Inspirational Film of the Year

- Courageous
  - Alex Kendrick; Stephen Kendrick

== Special awards ==
- "Uplift Someone" 2013 Award – Mandisa for the video and song "Overcomer"
- Bill Gaither tribute
- The Bible miniseries tribute
- Billy Graham tribute
