= Mann & Wife =

American sitcom (2015–2017)

- Genre: Sitcom
- Created by: David Mann; Tamela Mann; Roger M. Bobb
- Starring: David Mann; Tamela Mann; Vivica A. Fox; Tony Rock; Jo Marie Payton; Tiny Lister; John Marshall Jones
- Country of origin: United States
- Original language: English
- No. of seasons: 3
- No. of episodes: 30

Production
- Executive producers: Angi Bones; Tamela J. Mann; Ri-Karlo Handy
- Production location: Long Beach, California
- Running time: 22 minutes
- Production company: Bobbcat Films

Original release
- Network: Bounce TV
- Release: April 7, 2015 – May 23, 2017

Mann & Wife is an American sitcom that premiered on the digital television network Bounce TV on April 7, 2015.

The series stars real-life married couple David Mann and Tamela Mann as newlywed couple Daniel and Toni Mann, who blend their family together after getting married. Both police officer Daniel and teacher Toni have children from previous relationships; Daniel has two boys and Toni has two girls. Toni and her girls move into Daniel's house in Atlanta with Daniel, his sons, and his mother Lorraine (Jo Marie Payton). The blended family must navigate their new lives together.

Bounce TV announced the series on May 5, 2014 and the series premiered on April 7, 2015, with the first season consisting of 10 episodes. On June 16, 2015, Bounce TV renewed the series for a second season. On April 13, 2016, the show was renewed for a third season.

== Cast and characters ==
- David Mann as Daniel Mann, a police officer, Terri and Tasha's stepfather, DJ and Darren's father
- Tamela Mann as Antonia "Toni" Mann, a teacher, DJ and Darren's stepmother, Terri and Tasha's mother
- Jo Marie Payton as Lorraine Mann, Daniel's mother who lives with the family; a retired schoolteacher
- Tony Rock as Michael Hobbs, Daniel's new partner
- Tiny Lister as Daniel's former lieutenant and boss
- John Marshall Jones as Daniel's new lieutenant and boss
- Steven Walsh, Jr. as Daniel "D.J." Leviticus Mann, Jr., Daniel's older son
- Lauryn Kennedy Hardy as Terri, Toni's older daughter
- Amir O'Neil as Darren Mann, Daniel's younger son
- Jadah Marie as Tasha, Toni's younger daughter

=== Recurring ===
- Vivica A. Fox as Michelle Mann, DJ and Darren's biological mother, Daniel's ex-wife
- J. Anthony Brown as Lionel Mann, Daniel's brother and Toni's brother-in-law
- Rolonda Watts as Shawna, choir director
- Maverick White as Moenah, school teacher

== Development and production ==
Bounce TV announced the series in May 2014 with the series set to premiere in the winter of 2015. Production began in November 2014.

Bounce TV and Bobbcat Films were in a legal battle over the Mann's in November 2014. When co-creator Roger M. Bobb pitched the series in February 2014, Bobbcat also announced a reality series featuring the couple to air on BET. Since, Bobbcat has found a way to honor both series and the series premiered as scheduled on April 7, 2015.

== Episodes ==
Season	Episodes	Originally released	
Season	Episodes	First released	Last released
1	10	April 7, 2015	June 9, 2015
2	10	April 5, 2016	June 7, 2016
3	10	March 28, 2017	May 23, 2017

=== Season 1 (2015) ===
No. overall	No. in season	Title	Directed by	Written by	Original release date
1	1	"Pilot"	Roger M. Bobb	David Mann, Tamela Mann, Roger M. Bobb & Dani Renee	April 7, 2015
In the series pilot, Daniel and Toni return from their honeymoon and have to come back to reality when trying to navigate their blended families living together. DJ is stunned when Toni is his substitute teacher. Meanwhile, Daniel meets his new partner when he returns to the station.
2	2	"Mann's New Baby"	Roger M. Bobb	Ebony Rice & Indigo Ruffin	April 14, 2015
After the family falls sick, DJ's class assignment to care for an automated doll is left in the hands of Daniel. Lorraine substitutes for Toni's class and almost costs Toni her job.
3	3	"Mann-datory Counseling"	Roger M. Bobb	P.J. Paul, Jr.	April 21, 2015
After a series of unfortunate events occur from chasing a suspect, Daniel and Michael are forced to attend communication therapy. The kids fight for equal rights of their household chores.
4	4	"The Ex-Mann"	Roger M. Bobb	Ari Madison	April 28, 2015
Daniel's ex-wife, Michelle, comes to visit and the family is anxious for her arrival. Michael's girlfriend has Daniel worried that she is more than just a pretty face.
5	5	"The Mann Brothers"	Roger M. Bobb	Walt Underwood	May 5, 2015
When Daniel's brother, Lionel, makes a surprise visit, sibling rivalry takes over the Mann household. Toni tries to improve the school dress code, but upsets DJ in the process.
6	6	"Mann's New Church"	Roger M. Bobb	Dani Renee	May 12, 2015
Toni wants to join a new church, which frustrates Lorraine, and starts a tug of war with the family. DJ has tryouts at school, but Daniel is way too aggressive with his enthusiasm.
7	7	"Mann's Payback"	Roger M. Bobb	Chrystal A. Ellzy	May 19, 2015
When the family learns that a criminal Daniel put away years ago has been released, everyone is concerned with his safety. Toni tries to bond with DJ through video gaming and learns a valuable lesson.
8	8	"Mann's Bodyguard"	Roger M. Bobb	Ebony Rice & Indigo Ruffin	May 26, 2015
Daniel is hired as a bodyguard for a celebrity singer, who drives the family crazy. Terri becomes friends with the mean girls at school but soon learns the value of real friendship.
9	9	"Mann's to Make Her Dance"	Roger M. Bobb	Walt Underwood	June 2, 2015
Toni's mom, Carol, visits and clashes with Lorraine. Daniel is working on a case that may prevent him from going to Terri's father-daughter dance.
10	10	"Undercover Mann"	Roger M. Bobb	P.J. Paul, Jr.	June 9, 2015
Daniel and Michael go undercover to catch an art thief. Michelle visits and is excited to help DJ with a school assignment, but has a hard time convincing DJ she's up for the job.

=== Season 2 (2016) ===
No. overall	No. in season	Title	Directed by	Written by	Original release date
11	1	"Mann Up"	Roger M. Bobb	David Mann, Tamela Mann, Roger M. Bobb & Dani Renee	April 5, 2016
Toni's cousin comes to visit after another break up and gets set straight by Lorraine. DJ and Trey try to prove their masculinity by participating in a police ride along. Daniel and Michael fight for the Lieutenant's job.
12	2	"Miracle Mann"	Roger M. Bobb	Ebony Rice & Indigo Ruffin	April 12, 2016
Tasha thinks she has healing powers when her goldfish dies and comes back to life the next morning. She doesn't know Daniel replaced the fish after it died in his care. Michael has a relative come to visit and he tries to keep everyone from knowing.
13	3	"State of Mann"	Roger M. Bobb	P.J. Paul, Jr.	April 19, 2016
Michael falls in love. Terri's plans to attend college get derailed.
14	4	"Give That Man a Stake"	Roger M. Bobb	Ari Madison	April 26, 2016
Lorraine loses a pearl necklace when the choir members come over for practice. After missing several date nights, Daniel is forced to take Toni on a date, which is actually a stakeout.
15	5	"One Mann's Junk"	Roger M. Bobb	Walt Underwood	May 3, 2016
Lorraine becomes extra nice when she thinks that Daniel and Toni are putting her in a retirement home. Daniel and Michael give the Lieutenant some tips before his big date.
16	6	"Sick Mann"	Roger M. Bobb	Dani Renee	May 10, 2016
Toni takes things too far, when she helps Terri get ready for the school talent show. Daniel milks an injury to get pampered by the family.
17	7	"Funny Mann"	Roger M. Bobb	Chrystal A. Ellzy	May 17, 2016
Daniel and Michael go undercover in a comedy club to catch a criminal. Toni runs for the school board and goes against a mean rival (CoCoa Brown).
18	8	"Don't Kiss and Yell Mann"	Unknown	Unknown	May 24, 2016
Daniel's female sexual harassment training instructor (Elise Neal) makes a pass at him. Terri believes DJ's new girlfriend is bad news.
19	9	"Secret Lover Mann"	Unknown	Unknown	May 31, 2016
When Lorraine discovers racy notes, new perfume, and sneaky behavior, she thinks Toni is cheating on Daniel. Daniel goes to war with his next-door neighbor.
20	10	"Who's That Mann"	Unknown	Unknown	June 7, 2016
Daniel digs up clues about his real father in the season 2 finale. DJ tries to pass his driver's test with help from Daniel's former wife (Vivica A. Fox).

=== Season 3 (2017) ===
No. overall	No. in season	Title	Directed by	Written by	Original release date
21	1	"Take Me to the Mann"	Roger M. Bobb	Unknown	March 28, 2017
22	2	"Pressured By the Mann"	Roger M. Bobb	Unknown	March 28, 2017
23	3	"Ramblin' Mann"	Roger M. Bobb	Unknown	April 4, 2017
24	4	"Mann in Charge"	Roger M. Bobb	Unknown	April 11, 2017
25	5	"Come On, Mann!"	Roger M. Bobb	Unknown	April 18, 2017
26	6	"Mann Shark"	Roger M. Bobb	Unknown	April 25, 2017
27	7	"Dead Mann Walking"	Roger M. Bobb	Unknown	May 2, 2017
28	8	"Dope Mann"	Roger M. Bobb	Unknown	May 9, 2017
29	9	"A Woman's Mann"	Roger M. Bobb	Unknown	May 16, 2017
30	10	"Mann, Shut Yo Mouth"	Roger M. Bobb	Unknown	May 23, 2017

== Reception ==
=== Ratings ===
The premiere on April 7, 2015, was the most watched original programming for Bounce TV. The premiere episode garnered 0.46 million viewers, with 0.14 million in adults 18–49, and over .8 million viewers over its premiere time slots. The second episode grew to 1.3 million viewers over its time slots premieres.
