= Not Suitable for Work =

American comedy series

- Genre: Comedy
- Created by: Mindy Kaling
- Showrunner: Charlie Grandy
- Starring: Ella Hunt; Avantika Vandanapu; Will Angus; Jack Martin; Nicholas Duvernay; Jay Ellis
- Music by: Gabriel Mann
- Country of origin: United States
- Original language: English
- No. of seasons: 1
- No. of episodes: 9

Production
- Executive producers: Mindy Kaling; Charlie Grandy; Howard Klein; Greg Mottola
- Cinematography: Adrian Peng Correia; Shannon Madden
- Editors: Mat Greenleaf; Elizabeth Merrick
- Running time: 31–46 minutes
- Production companies: Kaling International; 3 Arts Entertainment; Charlie Grandy Productions, Inc.; Warner Bros. Television

Original release
- Network: Hulu
- Release: June 2 – June 23, 2026

Not Suitable for Work is an American comedy television series created by Mindy Kaling. The series stars Ella Hunt, Avantika Vandanapu, Will Angus, Jack Martin and Nicholas Duvernay. It premiered on Hulu on June 2, 2026.

Not Suitable for Work received generally mixed reviews from critics. In August 2026, the series was canceled after one season.

== Premise ==
Not Suitable for Work follows five work-obsessed twenty-somethings as they pursue professional success while seeking personal happiness in Manhattan's Murray Hill neighborhood in New York.

== Cast and characters ==
=== Main ===
- Ella Hunt as AJ Pascarelli, a first year analyst at Fisher Stassen
- Avantika Vandanapu as Abhinaya "Abby" Chilukuri, AJ's best friend and roommate who is an aspiring celebrity stylist
- Will Angus as Davis Beau Bradley Barrett IV, AJ's co-worker and next-door neighbor
- Jack Martin as Josh Teitelbaum, Davis's roommate and best friend
- Nicholas Duvernay as Kel Washington, Davis's other roommate and best friend
- Jay Ellis as Bill Gibson, a managing director at Fisher Stassen

=== Recurring ===
- Victor Garber as Wes Dryden, a famous investigative reporter and the host of his own show The Wes Dryden Show
- Judy Gold as Paula, Josh's boss and Wes Dryden's producer
- Harry Richardson as Austin Blanchett, a famous actor and Vanessa's client
- Constance Wu as Vanessa Hsu, Abby's boss and a famous celebrity stylist
- May Hong as Jocelyn, AJ and Davis's co-worker
- John Lutz as Warren
- Bhavesh Patel as Dileep, a vice president at Fisher Stassen
- Emilia Suárez as Elena, Josh's co-worker
- Ego Nwodim as Kate Woodson, the Assistant Head of School at an all-girls private school in Manhattan, who gets Kel a substitute teaching job
- Greg Germann as David Teitelbaum, Josh's father
- Michael Benjamin Washington as Antoine; landlord to AJ, Abby, and the boys

In addition, Alice Jokela, Hampton Persaud, and Alyssa Marvin co-star as Beth, Sarah and Marina respectively, 3 of Kel's students who push him to be a better teacher.

=== Notable guest stars ===
- Hannah Berner as herself
- Paige DeSorbo as herself
- Jack McBrayer as himself
- Ashanti as herself

== Episodes ==
No.	Title	Directed by	Written by	Original release date	Prod. code
1	"Welcome to Murray Hill"	Greg Mottola	Mindy Kaling	June 2, 2026	T88.11101
Davis, Josh, and Kel are three best friends who share an apartment together in Murray Hill: Davis is a financial analyst at prestigious investment bank Fisher Stassen, Josh is an aspiring journalist whose father is the CEO of a large media company, and Kel is a Columbia med school student whose true passion lies in acting. Their across-the-hall neighbors are Abby, an assistant to a celebrity stylist, and her former college roommate AJ, a Boston transplant recently hired as a first-year analyst at Fisher Stassen. When AJ moves into the building, she realizes that Josh is an old college hookup who ghosted her after a one-night stand; however, Josh no longer recognizes her. On AJ's first day in New York, she gets into an argument with a man who cuts in front of her while in line for coffee; Josh is initially turned down as a production assistant for his father's media company but gets the job after mentioning his last name in conversation with his idol, investigative journalist Wes Dryden; and Kel auditions for a play and later drops out of med school. When everyone in the building is escorted out after AJ's flat iron catches on fire, Josh learns that Abby is committing rental fraud by still listing her lease in her ex-boyfriend's name. On her first day at work, AJ becomes formally acquainted with Davis, who is immediately smitten with her, and learns that the man she yelled at the day earlier is her boss. Abby is forced to style a client on her own after her boss Vanessa gets hit by a car and hits it off with the client, famous actor Austin Blanchett. After Josh takes his knowledge of Abby's fraud to their landlord, the girls receive an eviction notice on their door.
2	"Evil Nepo Son of the King"	Lila Neugebauer	Mindy Kaling & Charlie Grandy	June 2, 2026	T88.11102
Abby and AJ confront their landlord Antoine, who refuses to let them stay in the apartment. Kel lands a job as an English substitute teacher at an all-girls' private school through his ex-girlfriend Kate. Despite being unprepared due to his unfamiliarity in the subject, Abby helps him prepare so that he can gain the respect of his new students. Vanessa sends Abby to the Cherry Lane Theatre, where Austin is performing a play. Austin asks Abby out on a date, but she turns him down due to strict rules against dating a client. Despite this, she later asks him a favor by getting him to tweet about a dance performance Antoine is hosting, which allows her and AJ to stay. She and Austin decide to stay friends. Josh, still reeling over getting dumped by his girlfriend Vivian, clashes with his co-worker Elena, who was initially supposed to be the new PA over him. He learns that his colleagues are on a group text that does not involve him and that they are having work drinks the next day. There, he is able to charm his colleagues and wins over Elena by doing some of her more menial tasks at the office. AJ, Davis, and senior analysts Dileep and Jocelyn are assigned to make a pitch deck for a lucrative client Fisher Stassen intends to sign; AJ accidentally messes up to models and is forced to print out new decks with Davis only hours before the client arrives. That night, Josh and AJ run into each other in the building's elevator, where she tells him how they know each other. Josh is finally added to the group text and starts putting away Vivian's things.
3	"The Philadelphia Thirst Monster"	Greg Mottola	Charlie Grandy	June 2, 2026	T88.11103
Josh and Kel agree to keep AJ and Josh's history from Davis, who is interested in her. AJ and Davis's team witness a blowup fight between Bill and his girlfriend Catherine at work. AJ impulsively invites Bill to a dinner she had planned to thank Davis for his help, resulting in Abby and Kel being invited as well. Meanwhile, Josh runs into Vivian and her new boyfriend while picking up wine for AJ, Kel starts working with an AI company, while Abby fails to retrieve expensive shoes from Harry. To impress AJ at the dinner, Davis consumes seafood despite a severe allergy. Davis tells the group that Josh had nicknamed AJ the "Philadelphia Thirst Monster" after their hookup for her eagerness; an indignant AJ reveals she was the girl and it was her first time. Josh arrives with the wine and the group dissects the hookup. Davis collapses from his allergy and the boys bring him to the hospital. Austin agrees to make it up to Abby and Vanessa. Privately, Josh admits to AJ that he was also a virgin. Bill arrives at the building but decides against attending.
4	"The Jawline of Your Dreams"	Erica Oyama	Sarah Tapscott	June 9, 2026	T88.11104
Fisher Stassen is handling the acquisition of independent shapewear brand The Cinchery to Spanx, but the founder, Chrys Lee, has a grudge against Bill. AJ convinces Chrys to a meeting and Bill to apologize to Chrys for insulting her business idea years ago, all against the advice of Davis, who had been hoping to act as her mentor. The team wears girdles to the meeting and the deal goes through. Kel's likeness is used in advertising for a plastic surgeon, resulting in his parents learning of his decision to leave medical school. He bonds with Abby, who is increasingly frustrated with Vanessa's demands, over pursuing their creative dreams. Kel is inspired to stand up for a student whose art hobby is causing conflict in her friend group. Wes tasks Josh and Elena with dispelling false rumors about his death. Josh convinces Wes to lean in to the rumors on air. Later that night, Elena tells Josh afterwards that Paula is the real brains of the show; Abby agrees to Austin's request to style him for an upcoming award show; Bill and AJ kiss in his office.
5	"Fisher Trashen"	Erica Oyama	Marina Cockenberg	June 9, 2026	T88.11105
Abby, who is struggling to tell Vanessa about styling Austin, connects him with Kel, who is seeking an agent. Austin agrees to help if Kel convinces Abby to date him. Kel ultimately declines his assistance. Davis is posted on Fisher Trashen, an Instagram account that airs company dirt, for a fling with an analyst named Madison gone awry. AJ, thrown by Bill's normal treatment of her at work, volunteers to speak with Madison. However, Madison explains that the relationship was more serious than Davis initially claimed. AJ gives Davis dating advice. In an attempt to endear himself to his boss Paula, Josh has his father pull some strings to get her an endocrinologist appointment in the city, only to learn that Paula lies about it to get a day off. Josh goes on a date with Elena and they sleep together. Outside the apartment, Bill asserts to AJ that the kiss was not a mistake, kisses her again, and escorts her to his car.
6	"Handsome Mug Guy"	Gillian Robespierre	Beth Appel	June 16, 2026	T88.11106
Abby agrees to style Austin for an anti-drug PSA, but has difficulty sourcing clothes because she left Vanessa. Kel, fed up with Davis and Josh, temporarily moves in with Abby and AJ and the boys struggle without him. Abby disapproves of AJ's secret relationship with Bill and Kel is caught in the middle. Davis, Josh and Kel reconcile, as do Abby and AJ; Kel reaches out to his ex-girlfriend Kate. AJ presses for a proper date with Bill. He takes her on the Staten Island Ferry and explains that it reminded him of his early days in New York, before his current success. Meanwhile, Elena is promoted and breaks up with Josh for his self-centeredness. Josh, having previously encountered Bill leaving the apartment, recognizes his face on one of Davis' mugs.
7	"Does Jon Hamm Cry?"	Gillian Robespierre	Matthew Warburton	June 16, 2026	T88.11107
Josh tells Kel about AJ's relationship and the two resolve to inform Davis over a steakhouse dinner, a tradition for dealing with difficult news they call "Steak and Tears". Josh learns his father is leaving his mother and, realizing his father is a terrible person, tearfully announces it at the Steak and Tears instead. Kel is turned away for an audition for a Jeremy O. Harris play for not having representation; inspired by catching his students playing hooky, he asks Davis to act as his agent. Harris is impressed by the stunt and lets Kel audition; he later gives him a small part. The shirt Abby styled Austin in is sold out, and she convinces the designer, Rafe, to sign him as a brand ambassador. AJ's visiting mother Amy brings a cake to the office for AJ's birthday, and AJ scolds her for the embarrassment. Davis comforts Amy, who lets slip that AJ likes someone at work. Josh stands up to his father at the office. AJ makes up with her mother, and Bill gives her the day off to celebrate. Davis is devastated to learn from his roommates that AJ is seeing Bill. Austin drops Abby as his stylist.
8	"Denver is For Lovers"	Lila Neugebauer	Kate Lindenburg	June 23, 2026	T88.11108
With Christmas approaching, Abby hopes to nab Jack McBrayer as a client. Josh's father cuts him off, forcing him to budget. AJ asks Josh about Davis' frosty treatment of her and learns that he knows of her affair of Bill. As punishment for leaving his classes early for rehearsals, Kate forces Kel to chaperone the winter formal. He recruits Abby to help Beth, a snobby student who is upset about her dress; in the hubbub, Abby leaves an expensive jacket on the subway and blames Kel for the fitting's failure. Meanwhile, Davis, AJ and Josh attend the Fisher Stassen holiday party. Davis, who is not over AJ, tells her he did not think she was the type to sleep with her boss. AJ gifts Bill a class ring, but he reacts awkwardly. Josh overhears Bill saying he is taking his girlfriend to Aspen for Christmas, but when Josh mentions this to AJ, she realizes Bill is seeing someone else. When she confronts him, he explains he got back together with Catherine and does not see a future with AJ.
9	"A Birthday Party for the Whole World"	Sara Bareilles	Charlie Grandy	June 23, 2026	T88.11109
Davis plans to spend New Year's Eve partying. Kate abruptly fires Kel. Abby, who has begun working retail to pay off the jacket, tells AJ that Davis has feelings for her. Josh teasingly comforts AJ about her breakup, and the two agree to spend New Year's together. He apologizes to his dad in order to get Wes a spot on a live show, and helps make the appearance a success. When Bill returns to work, Davis learns about Aspen and Bill's treatment of AJ. He gets into a fight with Bill and is fired. Kel is disappointed to learn his parents did not attend his play, but is pleased that his students did. Abby accepts Vanessa's offer to resume working with her. She attends Kel's cast party, but is secretly disappointed to watch him make a move on a castmate. Davis drops by the apartment and admits he defended AJ to Bill because he likes her. Josh watches them kiss.

== Production ==
=== Development ===
On April 4, 2024, a project name Murray Hill created by Mindy Kaling landed on Hulu after a bidding war with multiple buyers and a script-to-series commitment. On February 18, 2025, Hulu ordered Murray Hill, renamed Not Suitable for Work, to series. Kaling also expected to executive produce alongside Charlie Grandy and Howard Klein. Grandy also serves as the showrunner. Production companies involving with producing the series are Kaling International, 3 Arts Entertainment, and Warner Bros. Television. On August 24, 2026, Hulu canceled the series after one season.

=== Casting ===
On August 28, 2025, Ella Hunt, Avantika, Will Angus, Jack Martin, and Nicholas Duvernay were cast in lead roles. On September 24, 2025, Jay Ellis joined cast as a series regular. On November 5, 2025, Ego Nwodim, Constance Wu, Victor Garber, Greg Germann, Judy Gold, Harry Richardson, Laura Bell Bundy, Stella Everett, May Hong, Bhavesh Patel, Emilia Suárez, and Michael Benjamin Washington were cast in recurring capacities.

== Release ==
Not Suitable for Work premiered on Hulu on June 2, 2026, with the first three episodes released simultaneously and the remaining episodes released weekly until the series finale on June 23, 2026. Internationally, the series was released on Disney+.

== Reception ==
=== Viewership ===
Not Suitable for Work ranked No. 4 on Hulu's "Top 15 Today" list—a daily updated list of the platform's most-watched titles—following its premiere on June 2. The series subsequently reached No. 1 the following day and remained on the list from its premiere through July 9. TVision, which uses its Power Score to evaluate CTV programming through viewership and engagement across over 1,000 apps, calculated that it was the eighth most-streamed series in the U.S. through June 2026. Internationally, streaming analytics firm FlixPatrol, which monitors daily updated VOD charts and streaming ratings across the globe, reported that Not Suitable for Work ranked as the second most-watched series on Disney+ globally following its premiere. The series also placed No. 1 on Disney+ in Australia, New Zealand, and Belgium, while reaching the Top 10 in several other countries.

Not Suitable for Work averaged approximately 800,000 viewers across its first five episodes after eleven days. Luminate, which measures streaming performance in the United States using viewership data, audience engagement metrics, and content reach across multiple platforms, announced that it generated 653.5 million minutes of watch time and 2.2 million views during its first twelve weeks of release.

=== Critical response ===
On the review aggregator website Rotten Tomatoes, the series holds an approval rating of 54%, based on 24 reviews, with an average of rated reviews of 6/10. The website's critics consensus reads, "Not Suitable for Work feels like a sitcom from another era dressed up for a new generation, for better and worse." Metacritic, which uses a weighted average, assigned a score of 53 out of 100 based on 13 critics, indicating "mixed or average" reviews.
