= Tyler Perry's Assisted Living =

American television sitcom

- Genre: Sitcom
- Created by: Tyler Perry
- Written by: Tyler Perry
- Directed by: Tyler Perry
- Starring: J. Anthony Brown; Na'im Lynn; Courtney Nichole; Tayler Buck; Alex Henderson; David Mann; Tamela Mann
- Country of origin: United States
- Original language: English
- No. of seasons: 7
- No. of episodes: 143

Production
- Executive producers: Tyler Perry; Michelle Sneed
- Production location: Atlanta, Georgia
- Running time: 22 minutes
- Production company: Tyler Perry Studios

Original release
- Network: BET
- Release: September 2, 2020 – present

Related
- Meet the Browns

Tyler Perry's Assisted Living is an American television sitcom created and produced by Tyler Perry that premiered on BET on September 2, 2020. David Mann and Tamela Mann reprised their roles from Meet the Browns.

== Plot ==
After losing his job, Jeremy and his family decide to move back to Georgia to help his grandfather, who ends up buying a run-down home for the elderly and becomes way in over his head. Mr. Brown and Cora show up at the right time to be investors and run the retirement home with Vinny.

== Cast ==
=== Main ===
- David Mann as Mr. Leroy Brown
- Tamela Mann as Cora Simmons
- J. Anthony Brown as Vinny Washington
- Na'im Lynn as Jeremy Washington
- Courtney Nichole as Leah Washington
- Tayler Buck as Sandra Washington
- Alex Henderson as Phillip Washington
- Damien Leake as Reginald June (seasons 2–present)
- Chet Anekwe as Efe Omowafe (seasons 2–present)
- Alretha Thomas as Anastasia Devereaux (seasons 2–present)

=== Recurring ===
- Nicholas Duvernay as Lindor
- Rob Bouton as Todd the Inspector (seasons 1–2)

== Episodes ==
=== Series overview ===
Season	Episodes		Originally released	
Season	Episodes		First released	Last released
1	25		September 2, 2020	January 13, 2021
2	22		May 25, 2021	January 18, 2022
3	22		March 23, 2022	December 28, 2022
4	22		March 22, 2023	October 4, 2023
5	22	16	August 13, 2024	December 17, 2024
5	22	6	March 25, 2025	April 16, 2025
6	22	10	April 30, 2025	July 2, 2025
6	22	12	February 4, 2026	April 1, 2026
7	8		September 8, 2026	TBA

=== Season 1 (2020–21) ===
No. overall	No. in season	Title	Directed by	Written by	Original release date	Prod. code	U.S. viewers (millions)
1	1	"The Pilot 101"	Tyler Perry	Tyler Perry	September 2, 2020	101	1.08
2	2	"A Talk with Pa"	Tyler Perry	Tyler Perry	September 2, 2020	102	1.05
3	3	"Captain Crunch"	Tyler Perry	Tyler Perry	September 9, 2020	103	0.80
4	4	"Assaulted"	Tyler Perry	Tyler Perry	September 9, 2020	104	0.76
5	5	"For the Family"	Tyler Perry	Tyler Perry	September 16, 2020	105	0.86
6	6	"The Cleanup"	Tyler Perry	Tyler Perry	September 16, 2020	106	0.86
7	7	"The Weeping Willow"	Tyler Perry	Tyler Perry	September 23, 2020	107	0.86
8	8	"Swimming with Fishes"	Tyler Perry	Tyler Perry	September 23, 2020	108	0.81
9	9	"The Monster"	Tyler Perry	Tyler Perry	September 30, 2020	109	0.77
10	10	"Dark Chocolate"	Tyler Perry	Tyler Perry	September 30, 2020	110	0.76
11	11	"A Lamb to Slaughter"	Tyler Perry	Tyler Perry	October 7, 2020	111	0.74
12	12	"Hard Decisions"	Tyler Perry	Tyler Perry	October 14, 2020	112	0.80
13	13	"Mary Jane"	Tyler Perry	Tyler Perry	October 21, 2020	113	0.90
14	14	"A Huge Debt"	Tyler Perry	Tyler Perry	October 28, 2020	114	0.88
15	15	"Defiance"	Tyler Perry	Tyler Perry	November 4, 2020	115	0.88
16	16	"Rebel with a Cause"	Tyler Perry	Tyler Perry	November 11, 2020	116	0.67
17	17	"The Talk"	Tyler Perry	Tyler Perry	November 18, 2020	117	0.72
18	18	"Add More Color"	Tyler Perry	Tyler Perry	November 25, 2020	118	0.72
19	19	"The Brown Bomber"	Tyler Perry	Tyler Perry	December 2, 2020	119	0.92
20	20	"Open for Business"	Tyler Perry	Tyler Perry	December 9, 2020	120	0.94
21	21	"Being a Good Citizen"	Mark E. Swinton	Tyrell Crawford & Tyler Perry	December 16, 2020	121	0.96
22	22	"To Trust or Not to Trust"	Mark E. Swinton	Tyrell Crawford & Tyler Perry	December 23, 2020	122	0.97
23	23	"A Fight for Honor"	Derrick Doose	Tyler Perry	December 30, 2020	123	0.79
24	24	"A Dangerous Situation"	Derrick Doose	Tyler Perry	January 6, 2021	124	0.67
25	25	"The Dirty Denial"	Mark E. Swinton	Tyler Perry	January 13, 2021	125	0.60

=== Season 2 (2021–22) ===
No. overall	No. in season	Title	Directed by	Written by	Original release date	Prod. code	U.S. viewers (millions)
Part 1
26	1	"Bail Buns"	Mark E. Swinton	Crystal Garrett	May 25, 2021	201	0.66
27	2	"Best Laid Plans"	Mark E. Swinton	Adrian Dukes	June 1, 2021	202	0.57
28	3	"If the Cape Fits"	Mark E. Swinton	Branyon Davis	June 8, 2021	203	0.60
29	4	"The Triangle"	Mark E. Swinton	Branyon Davis	June 15, 2021	204	0.57
30	5	"Bait and Snitch"	Mark E. Swinton	Crystal Garrett	June 22, 2021	205	0.58
31	6	"Mega"	Mark E. Swinton	Adrian Dukes	June 29, 2021	206	0.47
32	7	"Driving Miss Crazy"	Mark E. Swinton	Branyon Davis	July 6, 2021	207	0.52
33	8	"Funny Bidness"	Mark E. Swinton	Crystal Garrett	July 13, 2021	208	0.56
Part 2
34	9	"Who Are You to Judge"	Mark E. Swinton	Adrian Dukes	October 12, 2021	209	0.64
35	10	"Yolo"	Derrick Doose	Branyon Davis	October 19, 2021	210	0.50
36	11	"Mr. Big Stuffed"	Mark E. Swinton	Branyon Davis	October 26, 2021	211	0.51
37	12	"Field Day"	Mark E. Swinton	Tyrell Crawford	November 2, 2021	212	0.47
38	13	"Christmas Staycation"	Mark E. Swinton	Tony Rhone III	November 9, 2021	213	0.55
39	14	"Only the Lonely"	Mark E. Swinton	Crystal Garrett	November 16, 2021	214	0.52
40	15	"Ark Tank"	Derrick Doose	Crystal Garrett	November 23, 2021	215	0.58
41	16	"Little Miss Sunshine"	Mark E. Swinton	Adrian Dukes	November 30, 2021	216	0.73
42	17	"What the Wellness"	Mark E. Swinton	Tyrell Crawford	December 7, 2021	217	0.57
43	18	"Pleasant Days Got Talent"	Mark E. Swinton	Adrian Dukes	December 14, 2021	218	0.61
44	19	"Stuck in a Ditch"	Derrick Doose	Crystal Garrett	December 21, 2021	219	0.56
45	20	"Jumping the Broom"	Derrick Doose	Branyon Davis	January 4, 2022	220	0.45
46	21	"Unpleasant Days"	Derrick Doose	Adrian Dukes	January 11, 2022	221	0.54
47	22	"Forgive and Forget"	Mark E. Swinton	Mark E. Swinton	January 18, 2022	222	0.62

=== Season 3 (2022) ===
No. overall	No. in season	Title	Directed by	Written by	Original release date	Prod. code	U.S. viewers (millions)
Part 1
48	1	"Forgive and Forgive"	Mark E. Swinton	Mark E. Swinton	March 23, 2022	301	0.70
49	2	"Judge Knot"	Mark E. Swinton	Branyon Davis	March 30, 2022	302	0.52
50	3	"Pastor Disaster"	Mark E. Swinton	Crystal Garrett	April 6, 2022	303	0.55
51	4	"Mr. Fix It"	Mark E. Swinton	Branyon Davis	April 13, 2022	304	0.52
52	5	"Testing 1, 2, 3"	Mark E. Swinton	Branyon Davis	April 20, 2022	305	0.45
53	6	"Efe the Great"	Mark E. Swinton	Crystal Garrett	April 27, 2022	306	0.43
54	7	"I Would Dye for You"	Mark E. Swinton	Adrian Dukes	May 4, 2022	307	0.50
55	8	"Ear Hustle and Flow"	Derrick Doose	Adrian Dukes	May 11, 2022	308	0.31
56	9	"Wobble Wobble"	Mark E. Swinton	Branyon Davis	May 18, 2022	309	0.51
57	10	"Clean Up Your Act"	Derrick Doose	Crystal Garrett	May 25, 2022	310	0.42
Part 2
58	11	"Don't Chi Away"	Mark E. Swinton	Crystal Garrett	October 12, 2022	311	0.68
59	12	"Ex to Next"	Mark E. Swinton	Branyon Davis	October 19, 2022	312	0.59
60	13	"Training Day"	Derrick Doose	Adrian Dukes	October 26, 2022	313	0.64
61	14	"Bye Bye Mr. Brown"	Mark E. Swinton	Tyrell Crawford	November 2, 2022	314	0.60
62	15	"Don't Get Ugly"	Derrick Doose	Crystal Garrett	November 9, 2022	315	0.62
63	16	"Head in the Clouds"	Derrick Doose	Adrian Dukes	November 16, 2022	316	0.52
64	17	"Twin It to Win It"	Derrick Doose	Branyon Davis	November 23, 2022	317	0.60
65	18	"She Got Baby Fever"	Derrick Doose	Crystal Garrett	November 30, 2022	318	0.57
66	19	"Fight the Power"	Mark E. Swinton	Adrian Dukes	December 7, 2022	319	0.64
67	20	"Blessin or a Lesson"	Mark E. Swinton	Tyrell Crawford	December 14, 2022	320	0.70
68	21	"Crazy in Love"	Mark E. Swinton	Branyon Davis	December 21, 2022	321	0.66
69	22	"A Day Away"	Mark E. Swinton	Mark E. Swinton	December 28, 2022	322	0.61

=== Season 4 (2023) ===
No. overall	No. in season	Title	Directed by	Written by	Original release date	Prod. code	U.S. viewers (millions)
Part 1
70	1	"I Believe"	Mark E. Swinton	Mark E. Swinton	March 22, 2023	401	0.57
71	2	"Houston, We Have a Karen"	Derrick Doose	Branyon Davis	March 29, 2023	402	0.56
72	3	"Yee to the Haw"	Mark E. Swinton	Branyon Davis	April 5, 2023	403	0.50
73	4	"Fight Night"	Derrick Doose	Branyon Davis	April 12, 2023	404	0.51
74	5	"Cupid Don't Lie"	Mark E. Swinton	Branyon Davis	April 19, 2023	405	0.46
75	6	"Dang, Leave Me Alone"	Mark E. Swinton	Tyrell Crawford	April 26, 2023	406	0.50
76	7	"Making a Pitstop"	Derrick Doose	Crystal Garrett	May 3, 2023	407	0.51
77	8	"Atrocious Hypnosis"	Mark E. Swinton	Tyrell Crawford	May 10, 2023	408	0.46
78	9	"Rich Ditch"	Mark E. Swinton	Crystal Garrett	May 17, 2023	409	0.43
79	10	"Finally, Father's Day"	Derrick Doose	Tyrell Crawford	May 24, 2023	410	0.58
Part 2
80	11	"Once Was Lost"	Mark E. Swinton	Crystal Garrett	September 13, 2023	411	0.46
81	12	"We Got Your Back"	Derrick Doose	Tyrell Crawford	September 13, 2023	412	0.43
82	13	"Drop Out Like It's Hot"	Mark E. Swinton	Branyon Davis	September 13, 2023	413	0.45
83	14	"Lights, Camera, Act Son"	Mark E. Swinton	Branyon Davis	September 20, 2023	414	0.48
84	15	"French Miss"	Mark E. Swinton	Crystal Garrett	September 20, 2023	415	0.52
85	16	"Golden Oldie"	Mark E. Swinton	Crystal Garrett	September 20, 2023	416	0.46
86	17	"Big Thanks Little Thanks"	Derrick Doose	Branyon Davis	September 27, 2023	417	0.38
87	18	"Super Senior"	Derrick Doose	Branyon Davis	September 27, 2023	418	0.40
88	19	"By Any Means Necessary"	Derrick Doose	Tyrell Crawford	September 27, 2023	419	0.34
89	20	"Love Grows Here"	Derrick Doose	Courtney Nichole	October 4, 2023	420	0.43
90	21	"Let the Church Say Amen"	Derrick Doose	Tracye Graves	October 4, 2023	421	0.46
91	22	"The White Flag"	Mark E. Swinton	Mark E. Swinton	October 4, 2023	422	0.42

=== Season 5 (2024–25) ===
No. overall	No. in season	Title	Directed by	Written by	Original release date	Prod. code	U.S. viewers (millions)
Part 1
92	1	"Tough Love"	Mark E. Swinton	Mark E. Swinton	August 13, 2024	501	N/A
93	2	"Ay-Bay-Bay"	Derrick Doose	Branyon Davis	August 20, 2024	502	N/A
94	3	"One Drop"	Derrick Doose	Crystal Garrett	August 27, 2024	503	N/A
95	4	"A Brown Baptism"	Mark E. Swinton	Tyrell Crawford	September 3, 2024	504	N/A
96	5	"To the Left"	Mark E. Swinton	Branyon Davis	September 10, 2024	505	N/A
97	6	"Dying for Love"	Derrick Doose	Crystal Garrett	September 17, 2024	506	N/A
98	7	"Drippin' Jesus"	Mark E. Swinton	Tyrell Crawford	September 24, 2024	507	N/A
99	8	"Forget Me Knot"	David Mann	Branyon Davis	October 1, 2024	508	N/A
100	9	"Roll Model"	Derrick Doose	Branyon Davis	October 8, 2024	509	N/A
101	10	"Red Handed"	Derrick Doose	Tyrell Crawford	October 22, 2024	510	N/A
102	11	"Cancel Culture"	Derrick Doose	Branyon Davis	November 19, 2024	511	N/A
103	12	"The Spark"	Justin Bones	Branyon Davis	November 26, 2024	512	N/A
103	13	"Where's My Refund?"	Derrick Doose	Crystal Garrett	December 3, 2024	513	N/A
104	14	"Baby Steps"	Derrick Doose	Courtney Nichole	December 10, 2024	514	N/A
105	15	"Remember the Times"	Derrick Doose	Tracye Graves	December 17, 2024	515	N/A
106	16	"Ghost Writer"	Mark E. Swinton	Tyrell Crawford	December 17, 2024	516	N/A
Part 2
107	17	"Total Knockout"	Mark E. Swinton	Crystal Garrett	March 25, 2025	517	N/A
108	18	"Failure 2 Launch"	Mark E. Swinton	Branyon Davis	April 1, 2025	518	N/A
109	19	"Who's Bad"	Mark E. Swinton	Tyrell Crawford	April 8, 2025	519	N/A
110	20	"24 Hours"	Derrick Doose	Tyrell Crawford	April 9, 2025	520	N/A
111	21	"Bye Bye Bye"	Mark E. Swinton	Branyon Davis	April 15, 2025	521	N/A
112	22	"Breaking Bad"	Mark E. Swinton	Mark E. Swinton	April 16, 2025	522	N/A

=== Season 6 (2025–26) ===
No. overall	No. in season	Title	Directed by	Written by	Original release date	Prod. code	U.S. viewers (millions)
Part 1
113	1	"The Last Days"	Mark E. Swinton	Mark E. Swinton	April 30, 2025	601	N/A
114	2	"Wobblewham"	Mark E. Swinton	Mark E. Swinton	May 7, 2025	602	N/A
115	3	"Spare The Rod"	Mark E. Swinton	Mark E. Swinton	May 14, 2025	603	N/A
116	4	"Dyna Woman"	Mark E. Swinton	Mark E. Swinton	May 21, 2025	604	N/A
117	5	"Parental Woes"	Mark E. Swinton	Mark E. Swinton	May 28, 2025	605	N/A
118	6	"Parental Progress"	Mark E. Swinton	Mark E. Swinton	June 4, 2025	606	N/A
119	7	"Writing the Next Chapter"	Justin Bones	Mark E. Swinton	June 11, 2025	607	N/A
120	8	"It Takes a Village"	Mark E. Swinton	Mark E. Swinton	June 18, 2025	608	N/A
121	9	"Diamond in the Rough"	Mark E. Swinton	Mark E. Swinton	June 25, 2025	609	N/A
122	10	"Speed Demons"	Justin Bones	Mark E. Swinton	July 2, 2025	610	N/A
Part 2
123	11	"Twenty-One"	Mark E. Swinton	Mark E. Swinton	February 4, 2026	611	N/A
124	12	"The Power Of Prayer"	Mark E. Swinton	Mark E. Swinton	February 11, 2026	612	N/A
125	13	"Figuring It Out"	Mark E. Swinton	Mark E. Swinton	February 18, 2026	613	N/A
126	14	"Mighty in Battle"	David Mann	Mark E. Swinton	February 25, 2026	614	N/A
127	15	"Heaven Sent"	David Mann	Mark E. Swinton	March 4, 2026	615	N/A
128	16	"The Secret Ingredients"	Mark E. Swinton	Mark E. Swinton	March 11, 2026	616	N/A
129	17	"The Cocoon"	Mark E. Swinton	Mark E. Swinton	March 18, 2026	617	N/A
130	18	"Voltran"	David Mann	Mark E. Swinton	March 18, 2026	618	N/A
131	19	"A Split Tree Grows"	Mark E. Swinton	Mark E. Swinton	March 25, 2026	619	N/A
132	20	"A Rolling Stone"	Mark E. Swinton	Mark E. Swinton	March 25, 2026	620	N/A
133	21	"Right Is Right"	Mark E. Swinton	Mark E. Swinton	April 1, 2026	621	N/A
134	22	"Snowmageddon"	Mark E. Swinton	Mark E. Swinton	April 1, 2026	622	N/A

=== Season 7 (2026) ===
No. overall	No. in season	Title	Directed by	Written by	Original release date	Prod. code	U.S. viewers (millions)
Part 1
135	1	"Bedside Man"	Mark E. Swinton	Mark E. Swinton	September 8, 2026	701	N/A
136	2	"Killa"	Mark E. Swinton	Mark E. Swinton	September 15, 2026	702	N/A
137	3	"The Home Remedy"	Mark E. Swinton	Mark E. Swinton	September 22, 2026	703	N/A
138	4	"As Good as Good Can Be"	Mark E. Swinton	Mark E. Swinton	September 29, 2026	704	N/A
139	5	"The Protector"	Mark E. Swinton	Mark E. Swinton	October 6, 2026	705	N/A
140	6	"Do the Right Thing"	Mark E. Swinton	Mark E. Swinton	October 13, 2026	706	N/A
141	7	"The Status Quo"	TBA	TBA	October 20, 2026	707	TBD
142	8	"A Long Day's Journey"	TBA	TBA	October 27, 2026	708	TBD
143	9	"Not Afraid"	TBA	TBA	November 3, 2026	709	TBD
144	10	"Out Of Time"	TBA	TBA	November 10, 2026	710	TBD

== Production ==
On May 3, 2021, BET announced that the second season would premiere on May 25, 2021. On the same day, ahead of the second season premiere, the series was renewed for a third season, which premiered on March 23, 2022. On March 20, 2023, it was announced that the fourth season would premiere on March 22, 2023. On April 16, 2024, the series was renewed for a fifth season that premiered on August 13, 2024. Season six premiered on May 6, 2025. In January 2025, it was reported that show was renewed for a seventh season, which premiered on September 8, 2026.
