= Nicholas Duvernay =

American actor

- Duvernay in 2026
- Occupation: Actor
- Years active: 2016-present
- Television: The White Lotus

Nicholas Duvernay (born 10 June 1999) is an American film and television actor. His television credits include portraying Zion in season three of The White Lotus (2025). His film credits include The Love Hypothesis (2026) and Reminders of Him (2026).

== Career ==
Growing up in Georgia, Duvernay initially wanted to be a football player but after a succession of injuries and having started acting at the age of 13 years-old, he moved from Atlanta to Los Angeles at the age of 19 years-old in order to pursue an acting career. He initially worked a number of menial jobs to pay his way in the industry.

Duvanwy appeared in the film Purple Hearts (2022) and had a recurring role as Drew in television series Bel-Air. He appeared as Zion in the third season of anthology series The White Lotus.

In 2025, he was cast in the Hulu comedy series Not Suitable for Work, created by Mindy Kaling and Charlie Grandy. The series premiered in 2026 and follows a group of young professionals navigating their careers and personal lives in New York City.

Duvaney’s film credits include the film adaptation of The Love Hypothesis (2026) and Reminders of Him (2026).

== Filmography ==
Film
Year	Title	Role	Notes
2016	Bad Girl	Male Student Two	Uncredited
2021	My Dead Dad	Stench	
2022	Purple Hearts	Armando	
2023	Perfect Addiction	Brent	
2026	Reminders of Him	Roman	
2026	The Love Hypothesis	Jeremy Langley	
2027	Shiver †		Post-production

Television
Year	Title	Role	Notes
2017	Gritz	Dante Reid	3 episodes
2020–2024	Tyler Perry's Assisted Living	Lindor	Recurring role
2022	The Rookie	Tyler Stent	Episode: "Heart Beat"
2022	All American: Homecoming	Emmitt Page	Episode: "Under Pressure"
2022	S.W.A.T.	Jaylon	Episode: "Donor"
2022	Magnum P.I.	Adam Akamu	Episode: "Remember Me Tomorrow"
2022–2023	The Winchesters	Anton	2 episodes
2023–2024	Bel-Air	Drew	Recurring role
2025	The White Lotus	Zion Lindsey	Recurring role (season 3)
2026	Not Suitable for Work	Kel Washington	Lead role
