= Take Me to the King =

Single by Tamela Mann

from the album Best Days
- Released: June 12, 2012
- Genre: Contemporary gospel
- Length: 5:03
- Label: Tillymann Music Group
- Songwriter: Kirk Franklin
- Producers: Kirk Franklin and Shaun Martin

Tamela Mann singles chronology
"Step Aside" (2010)	"Take Me to the King" (2012)	"I Can Only Imagine" (2012)

"Take Me to the King" is a song recorded by American recording artist Tamela Mann. "Take Me to the King" was released on June 12, 2012, as the lead single from Mann's third studio album, Best Days. At the 55th Grammy Awards, the song received a Grammy nomination for Best Gospel/Contemporary Christian Music Performance. Also a huge commercial success, "Take Me to the King" topped the US Billboard Gospel Songs chart for 19 consecutive weeks. Mann performed the song on the 44th GMA Dove Awards in October 2013. In 2023, "Take Me to the King" was certified two-times Platinum by the RIAA for sales exceeding 2,000,000 copies, making it the highest-certified gospel song in the US.

== Charts ==
=== Weekly charts ===
Chart (2012)	Peak position
US Bubbling Under Hot 100 (Billboard)	4
US Hot R&B/Hip-Hop Songs (Billboard)	44
US Adult R&B Songs (Billboard)	9
US Gospel Songs (Billboard)	1
US Heatseekers Songs (Billboard)	12

=== Year-end charts ===
Chart (2012)	Peak position
US Gospel Songs (Billboard)	11
US Gospel Digital Songs (Billboard)	6
Chart (2013)	Peak position
US Adult R&B Songs (Billboard)	28
US Gospel Songs (Billboard)	3
US Gospel Digital Songs (Billboard)	1
Chart (2014)	Peak position
US Gospel Digital Songs (Billboard)	2
US Gospel Streaming Songs (Billboard)	1
Chart (2015)	Peak position
US Gospel Digital Songs (Billboard)	2
Chart (2016)	Peak position
US Gospel Digital Songs (Billboard)	5
US Gospel Streaming Songs (Billboard)	1
Chart (2017)	Peak position
US Gospel Digital Songs (Billboard)	7
US Gospel Streaming Songs (Billboard)	1
Chart (2018)	Peak position
US Gospel Digital Songs (Billboard)	9
US Gospel Streaming Songs (Billboard)	1
Chart (2019)	Peak position
US Gospel Digital Songs (Billboard)	11
US Gospel Streaming Songs (Billboard)	2
Chart (2020)	Peak position
US Gospel Digital Songs (Billboard)	11
US Gospel Streaming Songs (Billboard)	6
Chart (2021)	Peak position
US Gospel Streaming Songs (Billboard)	22

=== Decade-end charts ===
Chart (2010–2019)	Position
US Hot Gospel Songs (Billboard)	4

== Certifications ==
Region	Certification	Certified units/sales
United States (RIAA)	2× Platinum	2,000,000^{‡}
^{‡} Sales+streaming figures based on certification alone.
