= Jack Martin (American actor) =

American actor and comedian

- Born: August 3, 1998 (age 28); Washington, D.C., U.S.
- Occupations: Actor, comedian
- Years active: 2020–present
- Known for: La Brea, Pizza Movie, Not Suitable for Work

John Martin (born August 3, 1998), known professionally as Jack Martin, is an American actor and comedian. He is best known for La Brea (2021–2024) and Pizza Movie (2026).

== Early life and education ==
Martin was born in Columbia, Maryland, and raised in McLean, Virginia where he attended Potomac School. He studied political science at Georgetown University, hoping to pursue a career in politics, but changed his mind after the first semester. He graduated a year early in December 2019. While at college, Martin attended summer courses in screen acting at the University of Southern California School of Cinematic Arts and New York University Tisch School of the Arts.

== Career ==
Martin began his career creating comedic content on social media platforms, gaining a following on TikTok prior to transitioning into television acting.

In 2021, Martin was cast as Josh Harris in the NBC science fiction drama La Brea, appearing as a series regular throughout the show's run. The series achieved a wide audience across broadcast and streaming platforms.

Following La Brea, Martin joined the cast of the Hulu comedy film Pizza Movie, produced by BriTANicK. He appeared in the Hulu series Not Suitable for Work, created by Mindy Kaling.

Martin has appeared in additional television and digital projects including The Rookie and All Rise.

== Personal life ==
Martin has been in a relationship with actress Lili Reinhart since 2023. He lives in Los Angeles, California. Martin was diagnosed with obsessive–compulsive disorder, a chronic neuropsychiatric condition, "late in high school," which he remained in treatment for as of July 2026.

== Filmography ==
=== Film ===
Year	Title	Role	Notes
2025	Senior Prank	Charlie	
2026	Pizza Movie	Blake	
2026	Happy Hours	Young Andrew	

=== Television ===
Year	Title	Role	Notes
2020	All Rise	Chase Tracker	Guest role
2021–2024	La Brea	Josh Harris	Main role
2025	The Rookie	Tulsa Braden	Guest role
2026	Not Suitable for Work	Josh Teitelbaum	Main Role
