= Pizza Movie =

2026 American comedy film

- Release poster
- Directed by: Brian McElhaney; Nick Kocher
- Written by: Brian McElhaney; Nick Kocher
- Produced by: Jeremy Garelick; Will Phelps; Billy Rosenberg; Jason Zaro; Molle DeBartolo; Max A. Butler; Matt Whelan
- Starring: Gaten Matarazzo; Sean Giambrone; Lulu Wilson; Jack Martin; Peyton Elizabeth Lee; Marcus Scribner; Caleb Hearon; Sarah Sherman; Justin Cooley; Daniel Radcliffe
- Cinematography: Bella Gonzales
- Edited by: Matt McBrayer
- Music by: Leo Birenberg; Zach Robinson
- Production companies: American High; All Things Comedy; LD Entertainment
- Distributed by: Hulu
- Release dates: March 13, 2026 (SXSW); April 3, 2026 (United States)
- Running time: 97 minutes
- Country: United States
- Language: English

Pizza Movie is a 2026 American absurdist stoner comedy film written and directed by Brian McElhaney and Nick Kocher. It stars Gaten Matarazzo, Sean Giambrone, Lulu Wilson, Jack Martin, Peyton Elizabeth Lee, Marcus Scribner, Caleb Hearon, Sarah Sherman, Justin Cooley, and Daniel Radcliffe.

The story follows college roommates Jack and Montgomery as they undergo surreal hallucinations after taking a fictional drug called M.I.N.T.S. Their journey to obtain pizza, the only way to counteract its effects, leads them into encounters with bullies, former friends, and overbearing resident advisors.

Pizza Movie was released on Hulu and Disney+ on April 3, 2026, to positive reviews from critics.

== Plot ==
College roommates Jack and Montgomery face a difficult semester. Montgomery struggles to connect with his crush, Ashley, while Jack becomes socially ostracized after a football tradition goes wrong. Both are frequently targeted by bullies including their former friend Lizzy.

One evening, Jack and Montgomery discover a tin of experimental drugs called M.I.N.T.S. (Mind Igniting Neural Tuning Stimulants), advertised as providing a relaxing high. They quickly discover that the effects are hallucinatory and often violent, and that the only way to counteract them is by consuming food. Having ordered pizza earlier, they navigate the dorm to retrieve it from the delivery robot Snackatron 3000, while avoiding the school's RA group led by the authoritarian Blake.

Under the drug's influence, Jack and Montgomery experience surreal visions, including an encounter with a figure named Juan who demands they amuse a baby. In a subsequent trial, they must traverse a hallway without swearing or their heads will explode. Montgomery uses this opportunity to speak meaningfully with Ashley. They encounter Lizzy, also affected by the drugs, who joins their quest.

The next phase forces them to relive past experiences in interactive flashbacks, culminating in a party hosted by disgruntled football players. At the party, Montgomery learns that Ashley is part of an unconventional folk punk band. During this phase, Jack and Lizzy swap bodies, leading to Jack experiencing popularity and Lizzy gaining insight into Jack's social torment and recognizing that Logan manipulates her for financial benefit. Montgomery also briefly inhabits his pet butterfly, Lysander, uncovering Blake's plan to confiscate rulebreakers' phones - including his and Jack's - and transfer them to Gralk Hall, a remote, undesirable dorm. Returning to their own bodies, the group flees as Blake disperses the party.

The trio encounters Sidney, an inept resident assistant (RA), who mistakes them for RAs. They discover that the next phase of the drug prohibits them from lying, and inadvertently inform Sidney of the truth. The trio narrowly escapes and reaches the pizza, though Lizzy departs when Logan implores her to join him on his party bus, promising that they have pizza there. Montgomery inadvertently reveals his plans to transfer to a new roommate, leading to capture by Blake before they can eat.

Blake corners Jack, intending to use his distinctive face to unlock all confiscated phones for transfer to Gralk Hall. Upon discovering that Logan lied about having pizza and being implored by him to pay for the bus, Lizzy returns to rescue Jack and Montgomery. With assistance from Ashley's band, they distract the RA and reclaim Jack. Blake attempts to destroy the pizza, but Snackatron 3000 saves it by leaping out a window.

The trio, believing they have merged into a single entity named Juan, confront the RA collectively. Blake threatens Jack with Gralk Hall, but Jack disables the phones, and Lysander causes Blake to fall down an elevator shaft which fixes the broken elevator.

The final phase manifests their worst nightmares, including chainsaw-wielding figures intent on harming them. The trio escapes by leaping out a window and reaches Snackatron 3000 for their pizza. They confront Blake, forcing him to consume the remaining M.I.N.T.S., revealing the hallucinatory nature of their reality as a "low-budget indie film." Eating the pizza ends the drug's effects, restoring normalcy.

In the aftermath, Montgomery declines Ashley, while Lizzy severs ties with Logan. Montgomery and Lizzy are implied to begin a romantic relationship, and the three friends return to their dorm, resuming tabletop gaming together, now united against their previous tormentors.

== Cast ==
- Gaten Matarazzo as Jack
  - Adam Herschman as an hallucinatory Older Jack
- Sean Giambrone as Montgomery
- Lulu Wilson as Lizzy
- Jack Martin as Blake
- Peyton Elizabeth Lee as Ashley
- Marcus Scribner as Logan
- Caleb Hearon as Sidney Putt
- Sarah Sherman as Frankie
- Justin Cooley as Byron
- Peter Gerety as Grandpa
- Bobby Moynihan as the voice of the Snackatron 3000
- Daniel Radcliffe as the voice of Lysander Featherhelm, Lord Of The Syracuse Meadows
- Miguel-Andres Garcia as Juan
- Brian McElhaney and Nick Kocher as themselves

== Production ==
In June 2025, it was announced that Hulu had acquired the distribution rights to a new comedy film, written and directed by Brian McElhaney and Nick Kocher with Gaten Matarazzo and Sean Giambrone in the lead roles. Principal photography began later that month, with Lulu Wilson, Jack Martin, Peyton Elizabeth Lee, Marcus Scribner, Caleb Hearon, and Sarah Sherman joining the cast. In July, Justin Cooley rounded out the cast. Filming took place in and around Syracuse, New York.

== Release ==
Pizza Movie premiered at the SXSW on March 13, 2026, and was released on Hulu on April 3. Internationally, the film was made available to stream on Disney+.

== Reception ==
=== Viewership ===
Pizza Movie ranked No. 1 on Hulu's "Top 15 Today" list—a daily updated list of the platform's most-watched titles—following its premiere on April 3. The film remained on Hulu's "Top 15 Today" list from its premiere on April 3 through April 16, before returning in April 19 and April 21.

=== Critical response ===
On the review aggregator website Rotten Tomatoes, 79% of 43 critics' reviews are positive, with an average rating of 6.4/10. The website's critics consensus reads: "Frenetic and frequently hilarious, Pizza Movie overloads itself with psychedelic toppings while remaining a tasty slice of gonzo comedy." Metacritic, which uses a weighted average, assigned the film a score of 64 out of 100, based on 9 critics, indicating "generally favorable" reviews.

Prior to the film's release, a screenshot of two separate YouTube trailers for the movie was edited with the added caption of "IM GOOD BRO 😂😂🤦." The image subsequently became an internet meme. McElhaney said that the duo were "still trying to fully comprehend it," and that the meme "might have helped awareness, so we'll see..." Later, Kocher stated that "it's trending toward a HUGE blessing though. I've seen EVERY meme, and I've found a lot to be really funny."
