= One Way (Tamela Mann album) =

Studio album by Tamela Mann
- Released: September 9, 2016
- Genre: Contemporary gospel
- Length: 52:37
- Label: Tillymann Music Group RED Distribution

Tamela Mann chronology
| Best Days (2012) | One Way (2016) |

Singles from One Way
- 1. "God Provides" Released: 2016; 2. "Change Me" Released: 2017

One Way is the fourth studio album by American recording artist Tamela Mann, released on Mann's own independent record label Tillymann Music Group on September 16, 2016. One Way debuted at number 45 on the US Billboard 200 and topped the Top Gospel Albums chart, becoming Mann's second leader on the latter, where it led for 20 weeks. The album was supported by two successful singles, "God Provides" and "Change Me", which peaked at #1 and #2 respectively on the Billboard Hot Gospel Songs chart.

== Track listing ==
Credits adapted from AllMusic.

| No. | Title | Writer(s) | Length |
|---|---|---|---|
| 1. | "One Way" | Eric Dawkins | 03:08 |
| 2. | "Through It All" | Daniel Bryant, Y'anna Crawley, Matthew Herman, Darius Paulk | 04:34 |
| 3. | "Jesus Again" | Travis Greene | 04:57 |
| 4. | "God Provides" | Kirk Franklin | 03:59 |
| 5. | "We Exalt Your Name" | Kari Jobe | 04:56 |
| 6. | "Potter" | Travis Greene | 04:17 |
| 7. | "That's What He Did" | Eric Dawkins | 03:39 |
| 8. | "For My Good" | Myron Butler, Bruce Robinson | 04:56 |
| 9. | "Change Me" | Thomas Clay | 06:05 |
| 10. | "Greater" | Myron Butler, Darrell Freeman, Tamela Mann | 04:38 |
| 11. | "Press" | Angel Higgs | 04:17 |
| 12. | "Say Oh" | Jaramye Daniels | 03:11 |

== Personnel ==
Credits adapted from AllMusic.

- Faith Anderson – Vocals (Background)
- Lloyd Barry – Horn Arrangements
- Michael Beral – Keyboards
- Michael Bethany – Vocals (Background)
- La'Tonja Blair – Vocals (Background)
- Erech Brookins – Bass
- Anthony "AJ" Brown Jr. – Bass
- Daniel Bryant – Composer, Drums, Keyboards, Programming
- Myron Butler – Producer, Composer, Engineer, Keyboards, Producer, String Programming, Vocal Arrangement, Vocal Producer, Vocals (Background)
- Joi Campbell – Vocals (Background)
- Manny Carter – Drums
- Chadney Christle – Vocal Producer
- Thomas Clay – Composer
- Monica Coates – Production Coordination
- Steven J. Collins – Keyboards, Talk Box
- Deonis "Pumah" Cook – Vocals (Background)
- Jaramye Daniels – Composer
- Eric Dawkins – Arranger, Composer, Engineer, Producer, Vocal Arrangement, Vocals (Background)
- Cleon Edwards – Drums
- Damon Farmer – Bass
- Jerrid Fletcher – Production Assistant
- Kirk Franklin – Composer, Producer
- Darrell Freeman – Bass, Composer
- Chris Godbey – Engineer, Mixing
- Richard "Rico" Gonzales – Engineer, String Programming
- Travis Green – Composer
- Matthew Herman – Composer
- Angel Higgs – Composer
- John Jaszcz – Mixing
- Kari Jobe – Composer
- KC Knight – Producer
- Braylon Lacy – Bass
- Phillip Lassiter – Horn Arrangements
- Mark Lettieri – Guitar, Lead
- King Logan – Engineer, Producer
- Tamela Mann – Composer, Executive Producer, Primary Artist, Producer, Vocals, Vocals (Background)
- Tia Mann – Featured Artist, Vocals, Vocals (Background)
- David Mann, Jr. – A&R, Executive Producer
- David Mann, Sr. – A&R, Executive Producer, Producer
- Shaun Martin – Bass, Keyboards, Producer, Programming
- Caleb McCampbell – Keyboards
- Melodie Davis – Vocals (Background)
- Rodney Middleton – Drums
- Frank Moka – Cajon
- Nicole Neely – Strings
- Todd Parsnow – Guitar
- Darius Paulk – Composer
- Daniel Pena – Drums
- Chris Peyton – Guitar
- Herb Powers – Mastering
- Matt Ramsey – Bass
- Derrick "Swol" Ray – Bass
- Bruce Robinson – Composer, Lead
- Cederias Robinson – Organ
- Michael Robinson – Keyboards, Organ
- Calvin Rogers – Drums
- Leo Saenz – Arranger
- Dominick Sanchez – Lead
- Robert Seawright – Drums
- Solomon Smalls – Keyboards
- Max Stark – Programming, String Arrangements, Strings
- Lakea Stokes – Vocals (Background)
- Jeff Taylor – String Programming
- Keith Taylor – Bass
- Timbaland – Featured Artist, Producer
- Brandon Tolliver – Drums
- Taylor Walton – Vocals (Background)
- Rick Watford – Lead
- Kermit Wells – Hammond B3, Keyboards, Organ
- Caltomeesh West – Vocals (Background)
- Chelsea West – Vocals (Background)
- Patrick Wright – Keyboards
- Y'anna Crawley – Composer
- Dariyan Yancey-Mackey – Vocals (Background)

== Charts ==
=== Weekly charts ===
| Chart (2016) | Peak position |
|---|---|
| US Billboard 200 | 45 |
| US Top Gospel Albums (Billboard) | 1 |
| US Independent Albums (Billboard) | 7 |

=== Year-end charts ===
| Chart (2017) | Peak position |
|---|---|
| US Top Gospel Albums (Billboard) | 1 |

=== Decade-end charts ===
| Chart (2010–2021) | Peak position |
|---|---|
| US Top Gospel Albums (Billboard) | 8 |
