= Tamela Mann =

American gospel singer and actress

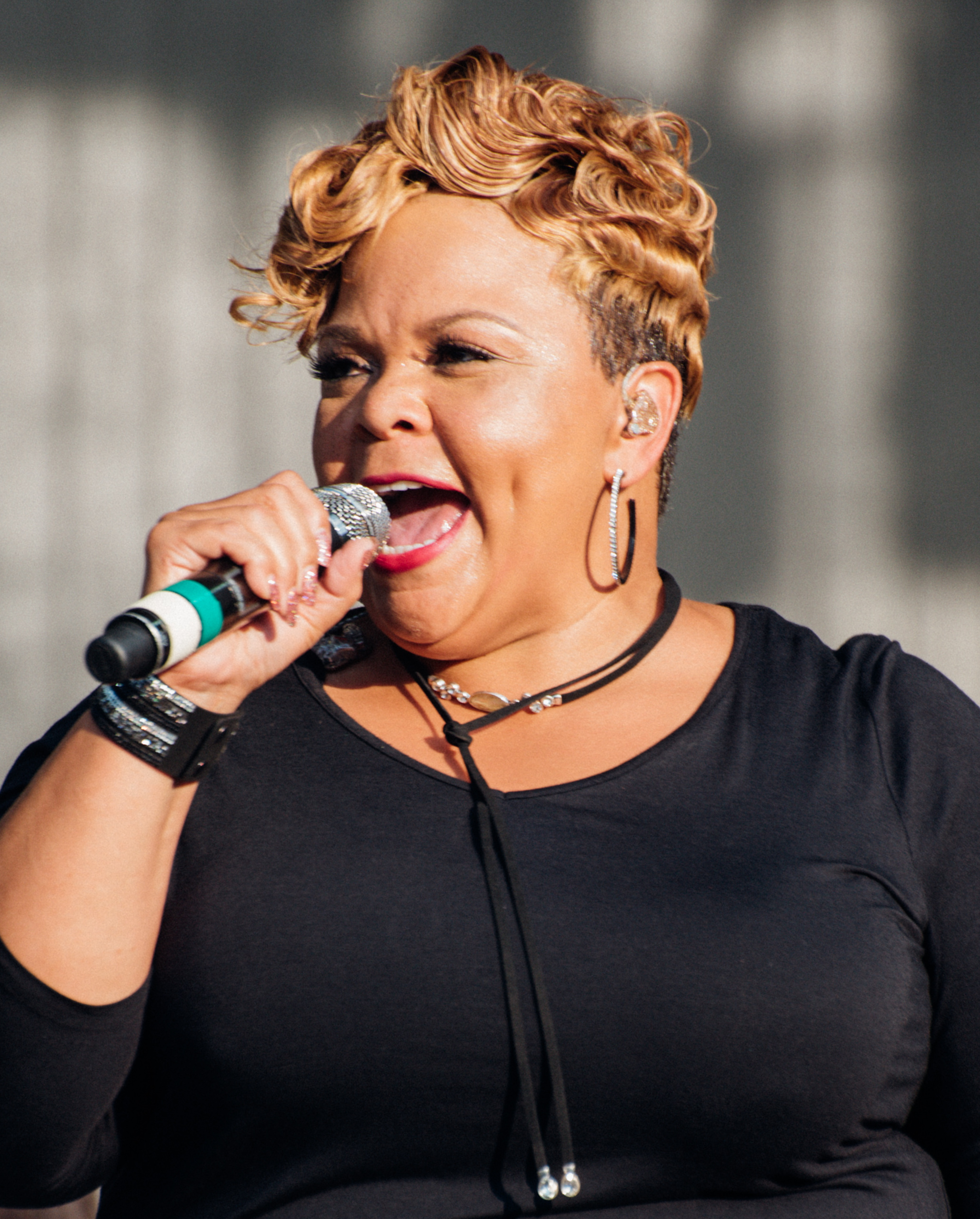
- Mann in 2017
- Born: Tamela Jean Johnson; June 9, 1966 (age 60); Fort Worth, Texas, U.S.
- Occupations: Singer, actress
- Spouse: David Mann Sr. (m. 1988)
- Children: 4
- Musical career
- Genres: Urban contemporary gospel; Gospel; Contemporary R&B
- Instrument: Vocals
- Years active: 1992–present
- Label: Tilly Mann Music Group
- Website: www.tillymannmusic.com

Tamela Jean Mann (née Johnson; born June 9, 1966) is an American gospel singer and actress. She began her career as a singer with the gospel group Kirk Franklin and the Family. Mann was a primary vocalist on several tracks while with Franklin's group, including "Now Behold the Lamb", and "Lean on Me", the latter of which also included Mary J. Blige, Crystal Lewis, R Kelly and Bono. She began her solo career by releasing the albums Gotta Keep Movin (2005), and The Master Plan (2009).

Her third studio album, Best Days reached No. 1 on the Billboard Gospel albums chart, and was certified Gold by the RIAA. The lead single "Take Me to the King" was a commercial success, and earned her a nomination for the Grammy Award for Best Gospel/Contemporary Christian Music Performance. Her fourth studio album One Way (2016), also reached No. 1 on the Billboard Gospel Albums chart; and spawned the single "God Provides", which won her the Grammy Award for Best Gospel Performance/Song in 2017.

Mann also is known as a stage and film actress. She has worked in multiple Tyler Perry productions playing the role of Cora Simmons. She appeared in Diary of a Mad Black Woman (both the stage play and the motion picture, and recorded some songs on the soundtrack including participating in the song "Father (Can You Hear Me)", Meet the Browns (2008), Madea Goes to Jail (2009), Madea's Big Happy Family (2011), A Madea Homecoming (2022) and Madea's Destination Wedding (2025). On television, she starred in the TBS sitcom Meet the Browns from 2009 to 2011, and in 2020 began starring in the BET sitcom Tyler Perry's Assisted Living. She also starred in and produced the Bounce TV sitcom Mann & Wife (2015–17).

Along with her Grammy Award, Mann has earned many other accolades and honors, including multiple NAACP Image Awards, a Billboard Music Award, an American Music Award, and a BET Award. In 2022, she was inducted into the Black Music & Entertainment Walk of Fame. In 2023, she broke the record for the most No. 1 singles on the Billboard Gospel Airplay chart, with ten of her songs topping the chart; including "Take Me to the King", which spent 25 weeks on the top.

== Early life and career ==
Mann was born in Fort Worth, Texas, the youngest of 14 children. She and her siblings grew up in a very spiritual home grounded in the Church of God in Christ (COGIC). They were reared by their mother, "Mother Eppe," who believed in and exercised solid biblical principles.

By the age of 12, Mann was singing in the church's adult choir and was often selected to sing solos. Although she was bashful, she blossomed in the local church and high school choirs.

=== Kirk Franklin and the Family ===
Mann's musical career began when she joined Kirk Franklin and the Family. She has also enjoyed collaborating and performing with artists such as Yolanda Adams, Mary J. Blige, Al Green, Celine Dion, Bono, R. Kelly, and Fred Hammond. "Local legends" that have collaborated with Mann include" Demarcus Williams, Myron Williams, Kermit Wells, Excell Amos, Myron Butler and a host of others. She went on to join the gospel musical cast of David E. Talbert as he directed the stage play He Say... She Say... But What Does God Say?.

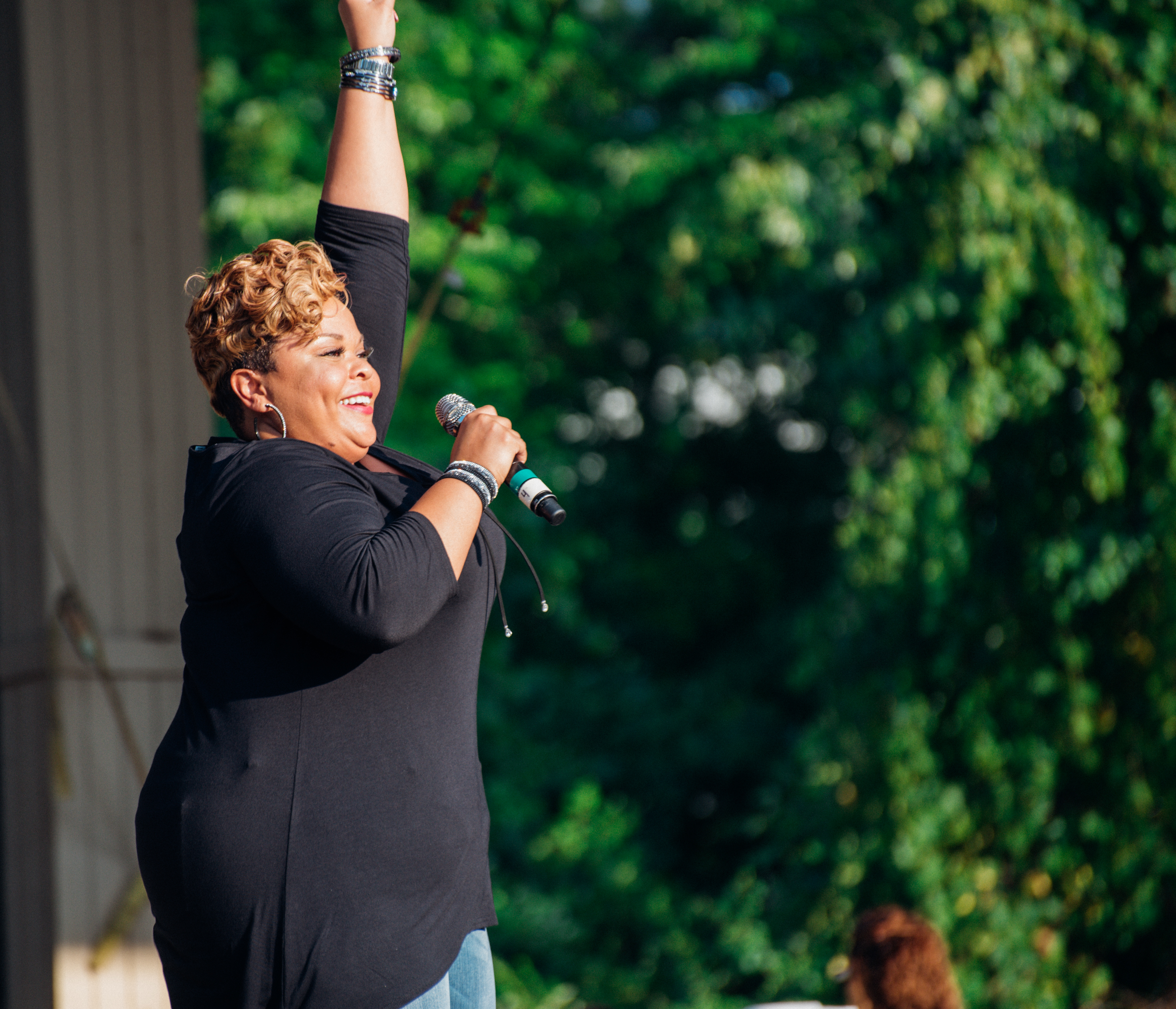
Tamela Mann in 2017

=== Solo musical career ===
In 2005, Mann and her husband David created their own label, Tillymann Music Group, through which they have released several projects. In 2005 her solo album, Gotta Keep Movin', was released. The lead single "Speak Lord" peaked at number 4 on the US Gospel chart. In 2007 she released her first live album, The Live Experience. Mann's songs "Father Can You Hear Me" and "Take It To Jesus" can be heard in the movie and on the soundtrack album of 2005 comedy-drama film Diary of a Mad Black Woman.

In 2009 her second studio album, The Master Plan, was released, adding a contemporary R&B sound. It peaked at number 2 on the Billboard Gospel Album Chart, and at number 97 on the Billboard 200.

Mann's third studio album, Best Days, was released on August 14, 2012. It debuted at number 1 on the Billboard Top Gospel Albums chart, and number 14 on the Billboard 200. The album was certified Gold by the RIAA and the lead single "Take Me to the King" was certified platinum and had major commercial success, as well as received a nomination for the Grammy Award for Best Gospel/Contemporary Christian Music Performance. In 2019, Billboard announced that Best Days was named the Gospel Album of the Decade.

Mann won the Stellar Award for "Best Female Gospel Artist of the Year" in 2014 and Best Gospel Artist at the 2014 BET Awards. In 2017, she won Grammy Award for Best Gospel Performance/Song for "God Provides".

In 2018, Mann released a duet album with her husband entitled, Us Against the World: The Love Project.

On August 7, 2020, Mann released the single "Touch from You" from her upcoming album. The single spent five weeks on the top and was her seventh number 1 on Billboard's Gospel Airplay chart. Her sixth studio album called Overcomer was released in 2021; it received positive reviews from critics.

=== Clothing ===
Aside from her musical and acting pursuits, Mann launched a new line of clothing, the Tamela Mann Collection, in 2019. The brand offers a variety of athleisure and workout wear for the curvy woman.

== Acting career ==
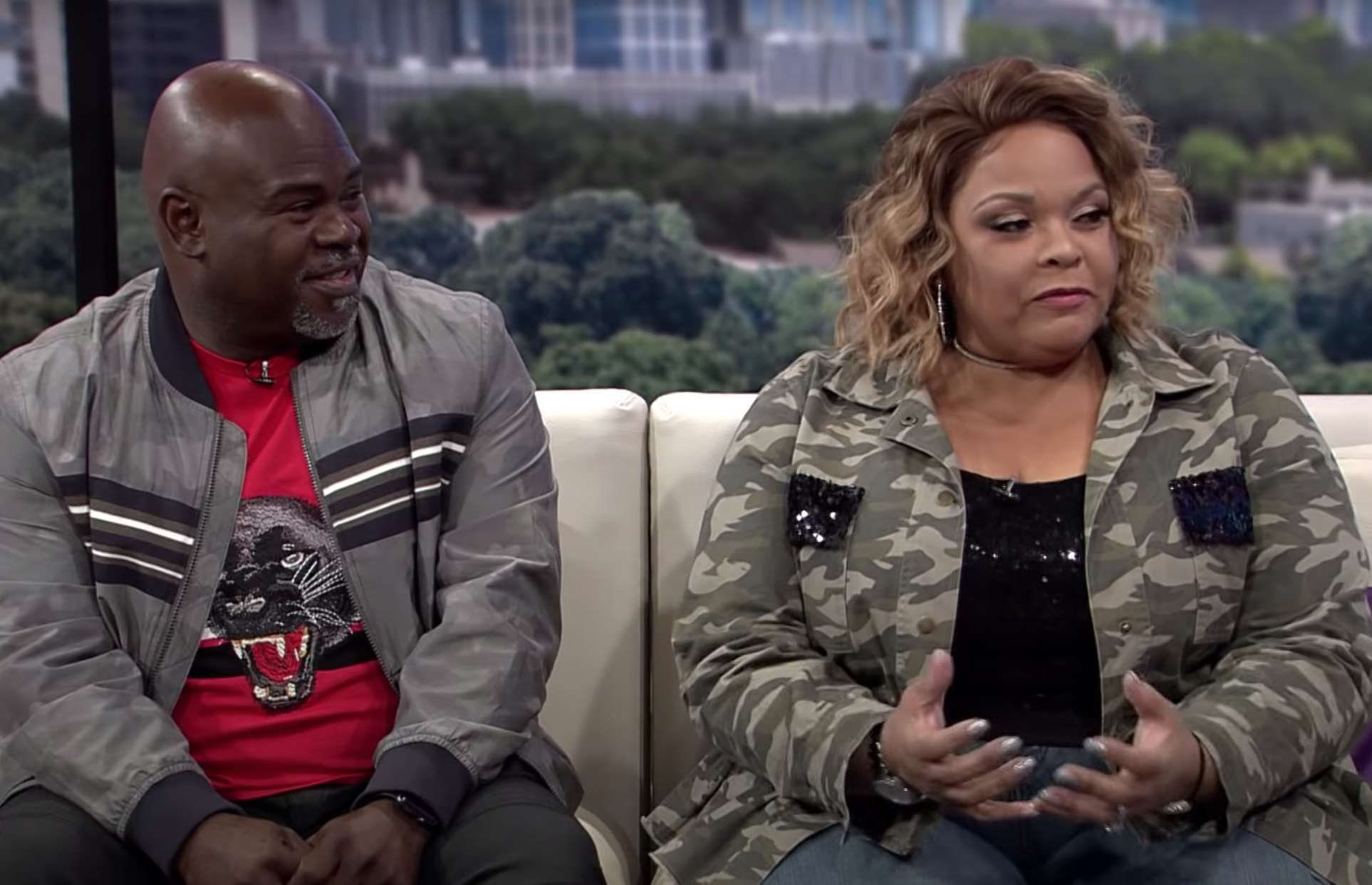
Tamela and David Mann in 2018

Mann began acting in 1999 when she was discovered by Tyler Perry. She debuted in the stage play I Can Do Bad All By Myself in 2000. The following year, she appeared in the comedy film Kingdom Come. She went on to act in Perrys plays Meet the Browns, Madea's Family Reunion, Madea's Class Reunion, Diary of a Mad Black Woman and What's Done in the Dark. She has appeared on television shows including The Tonight Show with Jay Leno, BET Soundstage, the 1999 Grammy Awards, the Dove Awards, and the United States of America World Olympics.

In 2005, Mann appeared in the romantic comedy drama film Diary of a Mad Black Woman which was inspired by the play of the same name. She reprised her role in the 2008 film Meet The Browns, having more screen time. The following year, she began starring on TBS sitcom Meet the Browns, the series ran to 2011 and 140 episodes was produced. She also appeared in Madea Goes to Jail (2009), Madea's Big Happy Family (2011).

In 2012, Mann appeared in the musical film Sparkle, a remake of the 1976 film of the same name, alongside Whitney Houston and American Idol winner and R&B singer Jordin Sparks, making her film debut. She co-starred opposite Lisa Arrindell Anderson in the 2014 drama film First Impression and starred and produced 2018 Christmas film Merry Wish-Mas with her husband. In 2021, she starred in another holiday film, Soul Santa.

From 2015 to 2017, Mann starred in the Bounce TV comedy series, Mann & Wife. The series was canceled after three seasons. In 2020, she returned to her role as Cora Simmons in the BET sitcom Tyler Perry's Assisted Living. In 2022, she appeared in A Madea Homecoming on Netflix. She later was cast in The Color Purple, a film adaptation for the screen from the 2005 stage musical of the same name.

== Personal life ==
Tamela is married to actor David Mann, known for his role as Deacon Leroy Brown in some of Tyler Perry's plays. In the Madea TV shows and movies, she plays Mr. Brown's daughter, Cora. The two have always worked together professionally.

David and Tamela renewed their 25th wedding vows in the spring of 2013. They raised five children together: David's daughters, Porcia, Tiffany and Tamela's niece Sonya, and their two children together, David Jr and Tia. They also have 8 grandchildren.

In January 2015, a reality show about their family, It's A Mann's World, premiered on BET. David and Tamela are devout Christians, and in this program are able to show how they have a fun-loving, balanced family, centered in godly principles and coping with real-life obstacles. In 2019, Tamela joined the WW International family as a weightloss ambassador. On July 23, 2019, Tamela had double knee surgery just a couple of months after starting her weight loss journey. She recovered quickly and went on to lose 100 pounds of weight by January 1, 2020.

== Filmography ==
=== Film ===
Year	Title	Role	Notes
2001	Kingdom Come	Lady	
2005	Diary of a Mad Black Woman	Cora Simmons	
2008	Meet the Browns	Cora Simmons	
2009	Madea Goes to Jail	Cora Simmons	
2011	Madea's Big Happy Family	Cora Simmons	
2012	Sparkle	Sarah Waters	
2014	First Impression	Sister Renee	
2018	Merry Wish-Mas	Kennie	Also producer
2021	Soul Santa	Liz	Also executive producer
2022	A Madea Homecoming	Cora Simmons	
2023	The Color Purple	First Lady	
2025	Madea's Destination Wedding	Cora Simmons	

=== Television ===
Year	Title	Role	Notes
1996	New York Undercover	as part of the church choir with Kirk Franklin and the Family	Episodes: "A Time of Faith" Part 1 & 2
2007–2008	Tyler Perry's House of Payne	Cora Simmons	Recurring role, 4 episodes
2009–2011	Meet the Browns	Cora Simmons	Series regular, 140 episodes
2013	In the Meantime	Minnie	Television film
2015–2017	Mann & Wife	Toni Mann	Series regular, 30 episodes, also executive producer
2015–2016	It's a Mann's World	Herself	Reality series, 20 episodes
2017	The Manns	Herself	Reality series, 10 episodes
2020–present	Tyler Perry's Assisted Living	Cora Simmons	Series regular

== Stage ==
- Madea's Farewell (2019) as Cora Simmons
- What's Done in the Dark (2007) as Cora Simmons
- Meet the Browns (2004) as Cora Simmons
- Madea's Class Reunion (2003) as Cora Simmons
- Madea's Family Reunion (2002) as Cora Simmons
- Diary of a Mad Black Woman (2001) as Myrtle Simmons
- I Can Do Bad All By Myself (2000) as Cora Simmons

== Discography ==
=== Studio albums ===
List of albums, with selected chart positions, sales figures and certifications
Title	Album details	Peak chart positions			Sales	Certifications
Title	Album details	US	US Gospel	US Indie	Sales	Certifications
Gotta Keep Movin'	Released: July 19, 2005; Formats: CD, digital download	—	3	26	US: 103,000 (Note: United States sales figure for Gotta Keep Movin', as of July, 2013.)	
The Master Plan	Released: November 3, 2009; Formats: CD, digital download	97	2	10	US: 155,000 (Note: United States sales figure for The Master Plan, as of November, 2013.)	
Best Days	Released: August 14, 2012; Formats: CD, digital download	14	1	3	US: 481,941 (Note: United States sales figure for Best Days, as of September, 2014.)	RIAA: Gold
One Way	Released: September 9, 2016; Formats: CD, digital download	45	1	7	US: 200,000	
Us Against the World: The Love Project (as David & Tamela Mann)	Released November 9, 2018; Formats: CD, Digital download	—	3	38		
Overcomer	Released August 6, 2021; Formats: CD, Digital download	—	3	—		
Live, Breathe, Fight	Released October 11, 2024; Formats: CD, Digital download	—	18	—		
"—" denotes items which were not released in that country or failed to chart.

=== Live albums ===
List of albums, with selected chart positions, sales figures and certifications
Title	Album details	Peak chart positions			Sales
Title	Album details	US	US Gospel	US Indie	Sales
The Live Experience	Released: May 8, 2007; Formats: DVD/CD	—	29	—	
"—" denotes items which were not released in that country or failed to chart.

- Soundtracks
  - Diary of a Mad Black Woman
  - Meet The Browns

=== Singles ===
==== As a lead artist ====
List of singles, as a lead artist, with selected chart positions, showing year released and album name
Title	Year	Peak chart positions				Certifications	Album
Title	Year	US Bub.	US Gospel	US Adult R&B	US R&B /HH	Certifications	Album
"Speak Lord"	2006	—	4	—	—		Gotta Keep Movin'
"The Master Plan"	2010	—	13	—	100		The Master Plan
"Joy Of The Lord"	2010	—	14	—	96		The Master Plan
"Step Aside"	2010	—	30	—	—		The Master Plan
"Take Me to the King"	2012	4	1	9	44	RIAA: 2× Platinum	Best Days
"I Can Only Imagine"	2014	—	2	29	—		Best Days (Deluxe Edition)
"This Place"	2015	—	3	—	—		Best Days (Deluxe Edition)
"God Provides"	2016	—	2	—	—		One Way
"Change Me"	2017	—	1	—	—		One Way
"Through It All" (featuring Timbaland)	2018	—	5	—	—		One Way
"Potter"	2019	—	8	—	—		One Way
"Good Love"	2019	—	14	18	—		Us Against the World: The Love Project
"Ups & Downs"	2019	—	22	21	—		Us Against the World: The Love Project
"Touch from You"	2020	—	4	—	—		Overcomer
"Help Me" (featuring The Fellas)	2021	—	9	—	—		Overcomer
"He Did It for Me"	2022	—	13	—	—		Overcomer
"Finished"	2022	—	19	—	—		Overcomer
"Working for Me"	2024	—	12	—	—		Live, Breathe, Fight
"Deserve to Win"	2024	—	7	—	—		Live, Breathe, Fight
"Hello God" (featuring Wyclef Jean and Kirk Franklin)	2026	—	25	—	—		Non-album single
"—" denotes items which were not released in that country or failed to chart.

==== As a featured artist ====
List of singles, as a featured artist, with selected chart positions, showing year released and album name
Title	Year	Peak chart positions	Album
Title	Year	US Gospel	Album
"My World Needs You" (Kirk Franklin featuring Sarah Reeves, Tasha Cobbs & Tamela Mann)	2017	4	Losing My Religion
"—" denotes items which were not released in that country or failed to chart.

=== Soundtrack and promotional singles ===
List of soundtrack and promotional singles, with selected chart positions, showing year released and album name
Title	Year	Peak chart positions	Album
Title	Year	US Gospel	Album
"Father Can You Hear Me" (with Tiffany Evans, Terrell Carter and Cheryl Pepsii Riley)	2005	21	Diary of a Mad Black Woman
"—" denotes items which were not released in that country or failed to chart.

=== Other charted songs ===
List of other charted songs, with selected chart positions, showing year released and album name
Title	Year	Peak chart positions	Album
Title	Year	US Gospel Digital Sales	Album
"Now Behold the Lamb"	2013	13	Best Days (Deluxe Version)
"You're the Lifter" (Ricky Dillard featuring Tamela Mann)	2020	4	Choirmaster
"—" denotes items which were not released in that country or failed to chart.

== Awards and nominations ==
=== American Music Awards ===
The American Music Awards are awarded annually. Mann has received 1 award.

Year	Award	Nominated work	Result
2022	Favorite Gospel Artist	Herself	Won

=== BET Awards ===
The BET Awards are awarded annually by the Black Entertainment Television network. Mann has received 1 award from 9 nominations.

Year	Award	Nominated work	Result
2010	Best Gospel Artist	Herself	Nominated
2013	Best Gospel Artist	Herself	Nominated
2014	Best Gospel Artist	Herself	Won
2016	Best Gospel Artist	Herself	Nominated
2017	Dr. Bobby Jones Best Gospel/Inspirational Award	"God Provides"	Nominated
2017	Dr. Bobby Jones Best Gospel/Inspirational Award	"My World Needs You" (with Kirk Franklin, Sarah Reeves, and Tasha Cobbs)	Nominated
2021	Dr. Bobby Jones Best Gospel/Inspirational Award	"Touch From You"	Nominated
2023	Dr. Bobby Jones Best Gospel/Inspirational Award	"Finished (Live)"	Nominated
2025	Dr. Bobby Jones Best Gospel/Inspirational Award	"Deserve to Win"	Nominated

=== Dove Awards ===
The Dove Awards are awarded annually by the Gospel Music Association. Mann has won 6 awards from 17 nominations.

Year	Nominated work	Award	Result
2011	Traditional Gospel Album of the Year	The Master Plan	Won
2011	Traditional Gospel Recorded Song of the Year	"The Master Plan"	Nominated
2013	Traditional Gospel Album of the Year	Best Days	Won
2013	Traditional Gospel Recorded Song of the Year	"Take Me To the King"	Won
2013	Gospel Performance of the Year	"Take Me To the King"	Nominated
2013	Song of the Year	"Take Me To the King"	Nominated
2013	Artist of the Year	Herself	Nominated
2014	Gospel Performance of the Year	"I Can Only Imagine"	Won
2015	Gospel Artist of the Year	Herself	Nominated
2015	Traditional Recorded Song of the Year	"This Place"	Nominated
2017	Traditional Gospel Recorded Song of the Year	"Change Me"	Won
2017	Gospel Artist of the Year	Herself	Nominated
2017	Contemporary Gospel/Urban Album of the Year	One Way	Nominated
2016	Contemporary Gospel/Urban Recorded Song of the Year	"One Way"	Nominated
2021	Contemporary Gospel Recorded Song of the Year	"Touch from You"	Nominated
2022	Traditional Gospel Recorded Song of the Year	"Help Me" (with The Fellas)	Nominated
2023	Traditional Gospel Recorded Song of the Year	"Finished (Live)"	Nominated
2023	Contemporary Gospel Album of the Year	Overcomer Deluxe	Nominated
2025	Contemporary Gospel Album of the Year	Live Breathe Fight	Won
2025	Contemporary Gospel Recorded Song of the Year	"Deserve To Win"	Nominated

=== Grammy Awards ===
The Grammy Awards are awarded annually by the National Academy of Recording Arts and Sciences. Mann has won 1 awards from 3 nominations.

Year	Award	Nominated work	Result
2013	Best Gospel/Contemporary Christian Music Performance	"Take Me to the King"	Nominated
2017	Best Gospel Performance/Song	"God Provides"	Won
2026	Best Gospel Album	Live Breath Fight	Nominated

=== NAACP Image Awards ===
The NAACP Image Awards are awarded annually by the National Association for the Advancement of Colored People (NAACP). Mann has won 9 awards from 14 nominations.

Year	Award	Nominated work	Result
2011	Outstanding Gospel Album (Traditional or Contemporary)	The Master Plan	Nominated
2013	Outstanding Gospel Album (Traditional or Contemporary)	Best Days	Nominated
2013	Outstanding Female Artist	Herself	Nominated
2014	Outstanding Gospel Album (Traditional or Contemporary)	Best Days Deluxe Edition	Won
2017	Outstanding Gospel Album (Traditional or Contemporary)	One Way	Won
2017	Outstanding Song, Traditional	"God Provides"	Nominated
2018	Outstanding Reality Program/Reality Competition Series	The Manns	Won
2019	Outstanding Literary Work – Debut Author	Us Against the World: Our Secrets to Love, Marriage, and Family	Won
2021	Outstanding Gospel/Christian Song	"Touch From You"	Won
2022	Outstanding Gospel/Christian Song	"Help Me" (with The Fellas)	Won
2022	Outstanding Gospel/Christian Album	Overcomer	Won
2024	Outstanding Short-Form Series - Reality/Nonfiction	Mama Mann's Kitchen	Nominated
2025	Outstanding Gospel/Christian Album	Live Breathe Fight	Won
2025	Outstanding Gospel/Christian Song	"Working For Me"	Won

=== Stellar Awards ===
The Stellar Awards are awarded annually by SAGMA. Mann has received 15 awards and 1 honorary award.

Year	Award	Nominated work	Result
2006	New Artist of the Year	Gotta Keep Movin'	Nominated
2008	Contemporary Female Artist of the Year	Tamela Mann - The Live Experience	Nominated
2008	Female Vocalist of the Year	Tamela Mann - The Live Experience	Nominated
2008	Producer of the Year	Tamela Mann - The Live Experience	Nominated
2011	Female Vocalist of the Year	The Master Plan	Nominated
2011	Contemporary Female Vocalist of the Year	The Master Plan	Nominated
2014	Albertina Walker Female Vocalist of the Year	Best Days	Won
2014	Artist of the Year	Best Days	Won
2014	CD of the Year	Best Days	Won
2014	Praise and Worship CD of the Year	Best Days	Won
2014	Traditional CD of the Year	Best Days	Won
2014	Traditional Female Vocalist of the Year	Best Days	Won
2014	Urban/Inspiration Single or Performance of the Year	"Take Me To The King"	Won
2015	Special Event CD of the Year	Best Days Deluxe Edition	Won
2017	Albertina Walker Female Vocalist of the Year	One Way	Won
2017	Artist of the Year	One Way	Won
2017	Producer of the Year	One Way	Won
2017	Traditional CD of the Year	One Way	Won
2017	Traditional Female Vocalist of the Year	One Way	Won
2017	CD of the Year	One Way	Nominated
2017	Urban/Inspiration Single or Performance of the Year	"God Provides"	Nominated
2018	James Cleveland Lifetime Achievement award	Herself	Honored
2018	Albertina Walker Female Vocalist of the Year	Overcomer	Won
2018	Contemporary Female Artist of the Year	Overcomer	Won
2018	Album of the Year	Overcomer	Nominated
2018	Artist of the Year	Overcomer	Nominated
2018	Contemporary Album of the Year	Overcomer	Nominated
2018	Song of the Year	"Help Me"	Nominated
2024	Albertina Walker Female Vocalist of the Year	Overcome Deluxe	Nominated
2024	Album of the Year	Overcome Deluxe	Nominated
2024	Contemporary Album of the Year	Overcome Deluxe	Nominated
2024	Contemporary Female Artist of the Year	Overcome Deluxe	Nominated
2025	Album of the Year	Live Breathe Fight	Nominated
2025	Artist of the Year	Live Breathe Fight	Nominated
2025	Contemporary Album of the Year	Live Breathe Fight	Nominated
