= Glory (Michael W. Smith album) =

Studio album by Michael W. Smith
- Released: November 22, 2011
- Studio: AIR (London, UK)
- Genre: Instrumental, CCM
- Length: 52:15
- Label: Reunion
- Producer: Michael W. Smith: David Hamilton

Michael W. Smith chronology
Wonder (2010)	Glory (2011)	Decades of Worship (2012)

Professional ratings
Review scores
Source	Rating
Jesus Freak Hideout	4/5 stars

Glory is an instrumental album by Christian recording artist Michael W. Smith. Released in November 2011, the album is Smith's second instrumental album following Freedom in 2000. The album was recorded with a 65-piece orchestra at AIR Studios Lyndhurst Hall in London and Wildwood Recording Studio in Nashville. The music was arranged by Smith's longtime friend David Hamilton, and produced by Smith himself.

== Track listing ==
No.	Title	Length
1.	"Glory Overture"	5:31
2.	"Patriot"	2:54
3.	"Heroes"	5:51
4.	"Forever"	4:02
5.	"Blessing"	3:38
6.	"Whitaker's Wonder"	3:06
7.	"Joy Follows Suffering"	3:07
8.	"Glory Battle"	4:22
9.	"Atonement"	3:50
10.	"Redemption"	5:35
11.	"The Romance"	3:28
12.	"The Tribute"/ "Agnus Dei"	6:51

== Personnel ==
- Michael W. Smith – composer, grand piano, additional programming
- David Hamilton – programming, orchestral arrangements and conductor
- Mark Baldwin – guitars
- Mark Hammond – percussion programming
- Jeff Bailey – trumpet, piccolo trumpet
- Sophie Harris – cello
- Gabrielle Lester – concertmaster, violin
- Paul Spong – contractor
- The London Symphonica – orchestra

== Production ==
- Produced by Michael W. Smith and David Hamilton
- Executive Producers – Michael W. Smith, Chaz Corzine and Greg Ham.
- Orchestra recorded by Geoff Foster at AIR Studios (Lyndhurst Hall, London, England), assisted by Chris Barrett.
- Piano recorded by Brendan Harkin at Wildwood Recording (Nashville, TN), assisted by Taemin Daniel Choi.
- Editing by David Hamilton at Studiowave (Brentwood, TN).
- Mixed by Rob Burrell at emotionmix studios.
- Mastered by Hank Williams at MasterMix (Nashville, TN).
- Ken Johnson – production manager
- Ric Domenico – music preparation
- David Shipps – music preparation
- Tim Parker – art direction, design
- Russ Harrington – photography
- Robin Geary – hair stylist, makeup

== Reception ==
Dawno's Music and Book Reviews on New Release Tuesday described Glory as "worth repeated listens" and that the album is "contemplative, majestic, somber, romantic, joyful, and playful." Lindsay Williams from watchgmctv.com wrote that Glory was "as sentimental as it is patriotic and boasts a collection of instrumental soundscapes that honor family, God and country."

== Chart performance ==
Chart (2011)	Peak position
US Billboard 200	121
US Christian Albums (Billboard)	7
