= Best Days (Tamela Mann album) =

Studio album by Tamela Mann
- Released: August 14, 2012
- Genre: Contemporary gospel
- Length: 58:02
- Label: Tillymann Music Group RED Distribution

Tamela Mann chronology
The Master Plan (2009)	Best Days (2012)	One Way (2016)

Singles from Best Days
- 1. "Take Me to the King" Released: June 12, 2012

Best Days is the third studio album by American recording artist Tamela Mann, released on Mann's own independent record label Tillymann Music Group on August 14, 2012. Best Days debuted at number fourteen on the US Billboard 200 and topped the Top Gospel Albums chart, becoming Mann's highest charting album to date.

== Chart performance ==
Best Days debuted at number fourteen on the US Billboard 200 with first week sales of 16,670 units. It also peaked at number one on the Top Gospel Albums chart, and number ten on the year-end chart. The following week the album sold 11,169 units 9,637 in its third, 10,286 in its fourth and 8,538 in its fifth week, bringing total sales to 56,300 units in just over a month. The album spent 484 weeks on the chart. As of August 20, 2014, Best Days has sold 475,085 units in the US.

The album's lead single "Take Me to the King", written by Kirk Franklin was also commercially successful. It topped the Billboard Gospel Songs chart and reached the top ten of the Billboard Heatseeker Songs chart. It also appeared on the Billboard R&B/Hip-Hop Songs chart peaking at number forty-four. In 2014, "Take Me to the King" was certified Gold by the RIAA for sales exceeding 500,000 copies. and two-times Platinum for sales exceeding 2,000,000 copies in 2023, making it one of the highest-certified gospel songs in the US.

== Track listing ==
No.	Title	Writer(s)	Length
1.	"Best Days"	Myron Butler, Darrell Freeman	04:17
2.	"I'll Hold On"	Jerome Armstrong, Terrence Battle, Michael Bethany, King Logan, Reggie Miller, Michael White	04:28
3.	"Guest Of Honor"	Rick Robinson	04:20
4.	"Take Me To The King"	Kirk Franklin	04:48
5.	"All To Thee"	Oscar Williams	05:23
6.	"Lord We Are Waiting"	Jamar Jones, Johnnie Murray	05:06
7.	"This Place"	Darrell Blair	05:17
8.	"Stretch"	Jonathan Dunn	04:08
9.	"Here I Am"	Jason Cox, Anthony Evans, Kari Jobe	04:06
10.	"Back In The Day Praise"	Terrell Carter	03:35
11.	"Rain"	Myron Butler, Tamela Mann	03:53
12.	"Hymns: The Blood Medley"	Myron Butler, Tamela Mann	08:53

== Charts ==
=== Weekly charts ===
Chart (2012–13)	Peak position
US Billboard 200	14
US Top Gospel Albums (Billboard)	1
US Independent Albums (Billboard)	3
US Indie Store Album Sales (Billboard)	14

=== Year-end charts ===
Chart (2012)	Peak position
US Top Gospel Albums (Billboard)	10
US Independent Albums (Billboard)	27
Chart (2013)	Peak position
US Billboard 200	119
US Top Gospel Albums (Billboard)	1
US Independent Albums (Billboard)	9
Chart (2014)	Peak position
US Top Gospel Albums (Billboard)	3
US Independent Albums (Billboard)	15
Chart (2015)	Peak position
US Top Gospel Albums (Billboard)	8
Chart (2017)	Peak position
US Top Gospel Albums (Billboard)	10
Chart (2018)	Peak position
US Top Gospel Albums (Billboard)	15
Chart (2019)	Peak position
US Top Gospel Albums (Billboard)	15
Chart (2020)	Peak position
US Top Gospel Albums (Billboard)	14
Chart (2021)	Peak position
US Top Gospel Albums (Billboard)	20

=== Decade-end charts ===
Chart (2010–2019)	Peak position
US Top Gospel Albums (Billboard)	1
