= Bhavesh Patel (actor) =

American actor and writer (born 1980)

- Born: 1980 (age 45–46); Chicago, Illinois, U.S.
- Education: New York University (MFA)
- Occupations: Actor, writer
- Years active: 2003–present

Bhavesh Patel (born 1980) is an American actor and writer best known for his role as Roland Maule in the 2017 revival of Present Laughter.

== Early life and career ==
Patel was born in Chicago youngest of four children, in 1980 in a Gujarati-American family. Patel's family later moved to Du Quoin, Illinois. His first acting experience was in high school in a production of Arsenic and Old Lace. In 2007, he graduated with a Master of Fine Arts degree from Tisch School of the Arts at New York University.

He is a member of theatre group The Grundleshotz, which also includes Sebastian Arcelus. Together with fellow Grundleshotz members and Ken Davenport, Patel wrote the book for Gettin' the Band Back Together.

In 2011, Patel appeared in the Broadway premiere of War Horse. In 2013, he had a recurring role as conniving attorney Anthony Wright Edelman on the fifth season of The Good Wife. In the same year he appeared in a Season 3 episode of Blue Bloods, 'Ends and Means', as "Jared Mehra". In 2014, he appeared Off-Broadway with Romola Garai in Indian Ink.

In 2017, he starred as Roland Maule in Present Laughter opposite Kevin Kline. In 2017, he played Theseus in A Midsummer Night's Dream at Shakespeare in the Park.
