= J. Anthony Brown =

American comedian and tailor (born 1952)

- Born: James Anthony Brown; November 16, 1945 (age 80); Columbia, South Carolina, U.S.

James Anthony Brown (born November 16, 1945) is an American comedian, actor and radio personality. He received the Peabody Award and the NAACP Image Award.

== Biography ==
=== Early life ===
Brown started his career in Atlanta, Georgia, after relocating there from his home in South Carolina. Having attended Denmark Technical College, an HBCU in Denmark, South Carolina, Brown was a tailor by trade and aspired to be a clothing designer before putting together a comedy routine after entering a local 'gong show' contest in a local nightclub, Mr. V's Figure Eight in Atlanta, Georgia. Invited back to host on a regular basis, Brown became a fixture, performing there for the next two years.

=== Professional career ===
He left Atlanta for Los Angeles, California, in 1989 to pursue work in television, quickly finding a job as a staff writer for the nationally syndicated, late-night talk show, The Arsenio Hall Show. After five years, Brown found other writing assignments for such sitcoms as The Parent 'Hood and Me and the Boys.

He has performed on Vibe, Def Comedy Jam, It's Showtime at the Apollo, An Evening at the Improv and The Oprah Winfrey Show, and had recurring roles on Moesha, Living Single and The Parent 'Hood, as well as guest spots on The Parkers and Sparks. His motion picture work includes roles in Def Jam's How to Be a Player, Pay the Price, Drumline and Mr. 3000. He has also warmed up audiences at the tapings of Martin, Sister, Sister, Roc and Hangin' with Mr. Cooper.

From 1996 until November 25, 2016, Brown appeared on the Tom Joyner Morning Show, a nationwide radio show broadcast from Dallas,

Brown was awarded an NAACP Image Award and Peabody Award in 1993 for his contribution to reconstruction after the 1992 LA uprising.

Brown is working as executive producer for an upcoming reality competition TV show.

On April 23, 2022, Brown announced he is retiring from The Steve Harvey Morning Show.

In February 2020, it was announced that Brown had been cast in Tyler Perry's Assisted Living which aired on BET on September 2, 2020.

=== Personal life ===
Brown was initiated into Phi Beta Sigma fraternity, Eta Beta Sigma alumni chapter in Nashville. He is the owner of the J. Anthony Brown Collection, The J. Spot Clothing Store, and The J. Anthony Brown Comedy Store in Los Angeles, California.

Both of Brown's parents died from diabetes.
