= Internet personality =

Person who has become famous through their use of the Internet

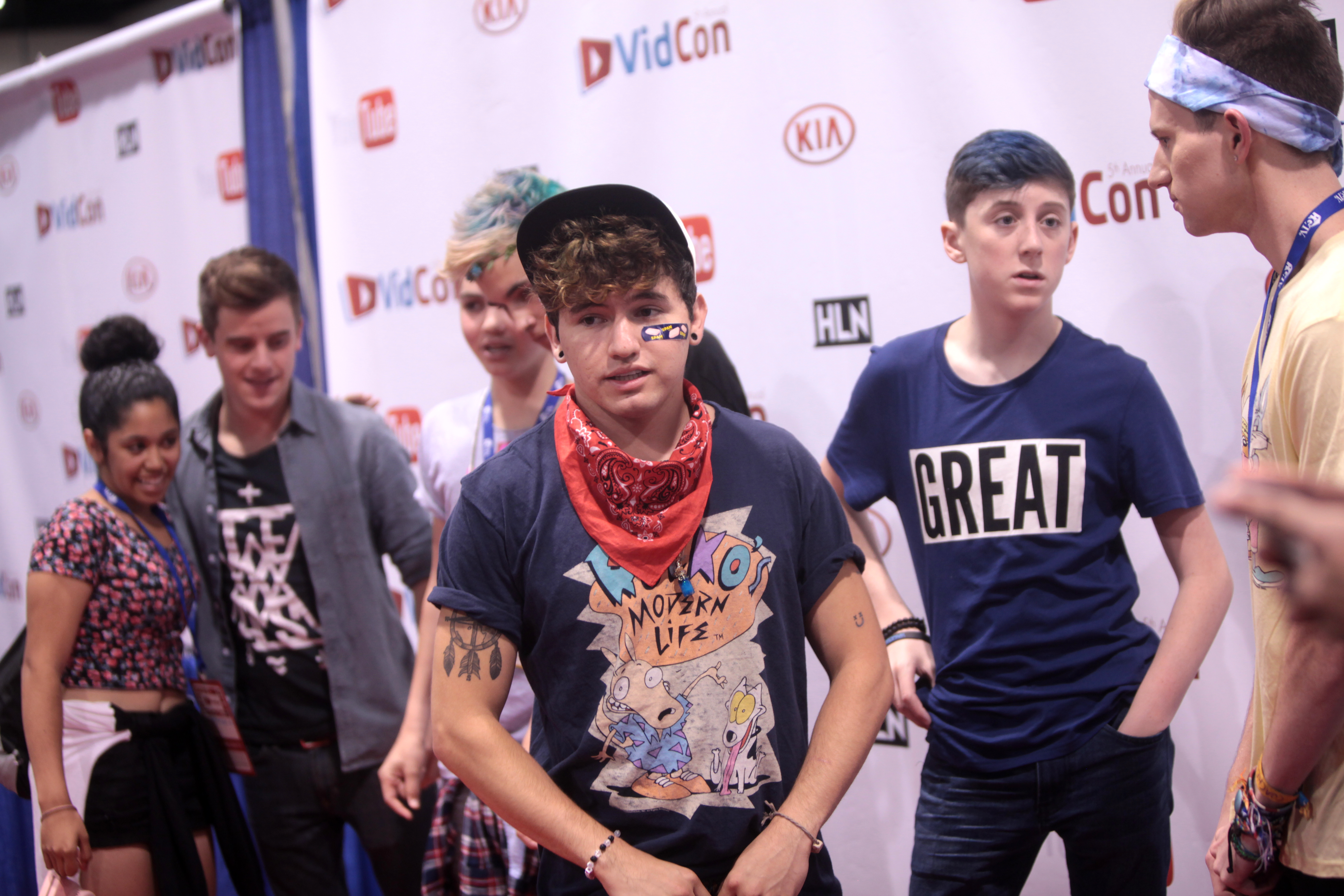
Internet personalities Connor Franta, Trevi Moran, Kian Lawley, JC Caylen and Ricky Dillon at VidCon, a convention for YouTubers, in 2014

An internet personality, also referred to as an internet celebrity, is an individual who has acquired or developed their fame and notability on the Internet. The growing popularity of social media provides a means for people to reach a large, global audience, and internet personalities are commonly present on large online platforms such as Facebook, Instagram, TikTok, and YouTube, which primarily rely on user-generated content. Some internet personalities are known as social media influencers, or simply influencers, due to their social influence online.

Certain internet personalities may function as lifestyle gurus promoting a particular lifestyle or attitude. In this capacity they act as key amplifiers of trends across various genres including fashion, cooking, technology, travel, video games, movies, esports, politics, music, sports, and entertainment. As part of influencer marketing, companies and organizations may enlist internet personalities to advertise their products to their fan base and followers on their respective platforms.

== History ==
In 1991, the Internet and the World Wide Web became widely available, leading to the creation of numerous websites dedicated to shared interests. These forums allowed users to seek advice and help from experienced individuals in their field, increasing the availability of information beyond mainstream print media and corporate websites. Dedicated social media platforms emerged from these developments, providing users with the ability to create profiles and connect with others. SixDegrees.com pioneered this concept in 1997. Additionally, websites supporting blogging emerged around the same time, allowing users to publish long-form articles and stories. Since then forums, social media and blogging have transformed into integral components of communication, social interaction, business and journalism. Popular social media platforms in 2019 included Facebook, Instagram, YouTube, Reddit, Twitch, Snapchat, TikTok, Twitter, Discord, Viber, WeChat, and WhatsApp.

== Types ==
Depending on their rise to fame, internet personalities may reach their audiences in different ways. Some people write journals or blogs, some make YouTube or TikTok videos, others post frequently on Instagram or Twitter (X). The Internet has made fame accessible to and attainable for the general public. In some cases, people might rise to fame through a single viral event or viral video, and become an Internet meme. For example, Zach Anner, a comedian from Austin, Texas, gained worldwide attention after submitting a video to Oprah Winfrey's "Search for the Next TV Star" competition. Viral videos from internet personalities could entail a funny event happening in the moment, a popular new dance, or even a post on Twitter.

=== Influencers ===
An influencer is someone who has the ability to alter the attitudes, behaviour, or decisions of others through authority, knowledge, position, or the nature of their relationship with the audience. Such ability is either inherent to their personality or is constructed by others for benefit. This benefit can be either social, personal, and or economical. The term 'influencer' is used in fields such as media, business, politics, religion, and communication, referring to people such as social media influencers, podcasters, public speakers, religious influencers, writers, and newsletter writers who have dedicated followings in various areas.

One writer defines influencers as "a range of third parties who exercise influence over the organization and its potential customers." Another defines an influencer as a "third party who significantly shapes the customer's purchasing decision but may never be accountable for it." According to another writer, influencers are "well-connected, create an impact, have active minds, and are trendsetters". Just because a person has many followers does not necessarily mean they have much influence over those people.

In contemporary usage, the term frequently refers to a social media influencer or online influencer, a person who builds a grassroots online presence through engaging content such as photos, videos, and updates. This is done by using direct audience interaction to establish authenticity, expertise, and appeal, and by standing apart from traditional celebrities by growing their platform through social media rather than pre-existing fame. The modern referent of the term is commonly a paid role in which a business entity pays for the social media influence-for-hire activity to promote its products and services, known as influencer marketing. A 1% increase in spending on influencer marketing can lead to a 0.5% increase in audience engagement. As such, an influencer effectively acts as a modern salesperson or a marketer. Types of influencers include fashion influencer, travel influencer, and virtual influencer, and they involve content creators and streamers.

Some influencers are associated primarily with specific social media apps such as TikTok, Instagram, or Pinterest; many influencers are also considered internet celebrities. As of 2023, Instagram is the social media platform businesses spend the most advertising money towards marketing with influencers. However, influencers can have an impact on any social media network.

=== Usenet personalities ===
A Usenet personality was a particular kind of internet personality who gained a certain level of notoriety from posting on the Usenet discussion forum. Since its inception, Usenet newsgroups have attracted a wide variety of users. Some posters achieved a certain amount of fame and celebrity within Usenet circles because of their unusual or humorous writings.

=== YouTubers and vloggers ===
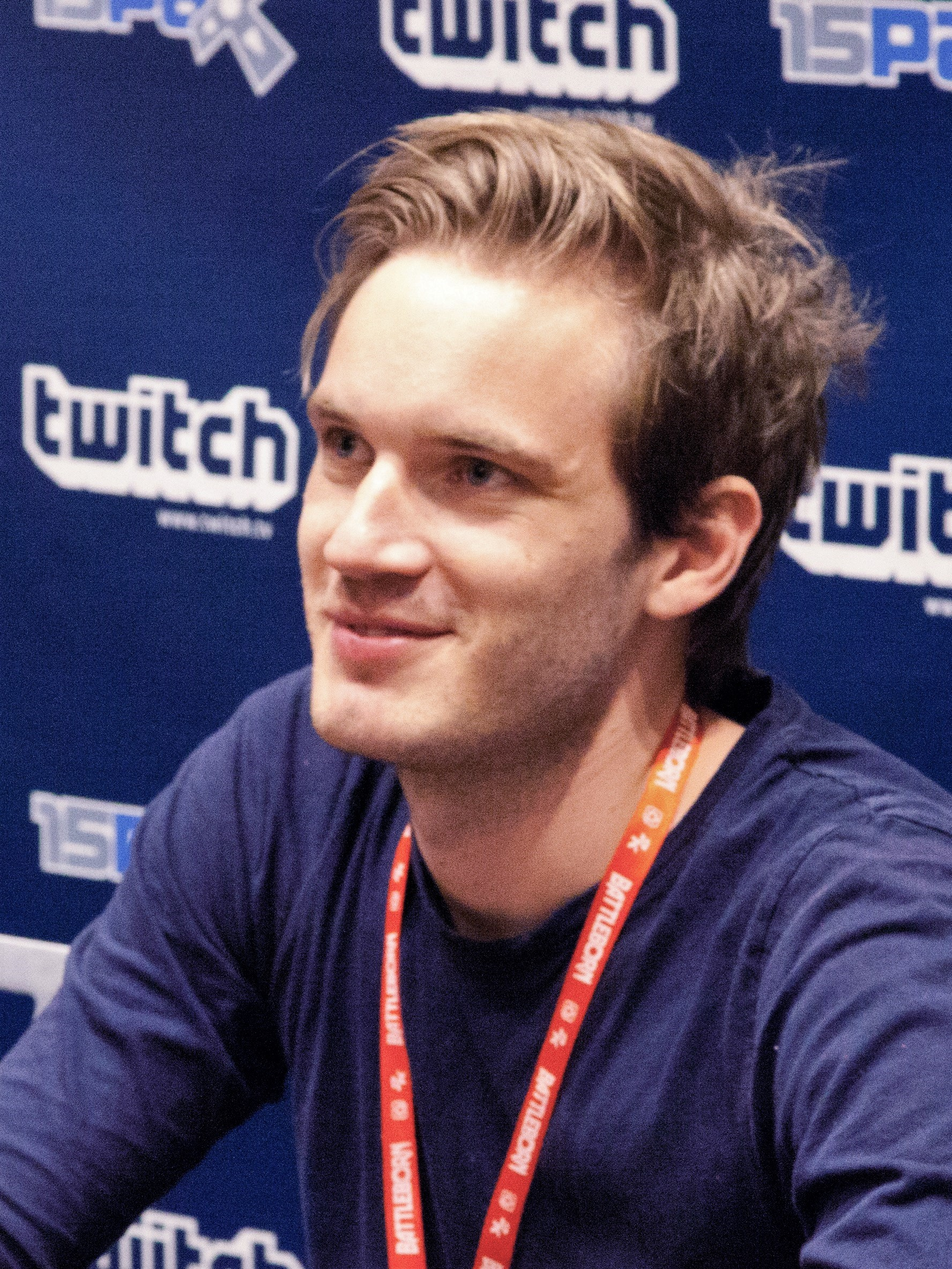
PewDiePie is an internet personality and the fourth most subscribed individual YouTuber. Overall, he has the ninth-most subscribed YouTube channel.

YouTube has risen as one of the biggest platforms for launching internet personalities. YouTube creators (known as YouTubers), regardless of the genres or types of videos they make, have created an industry that can generate revenue from video views and online popularity. For example, Swedish internet personality PewDiePie uploads gaming and comedy videos on YouTube. As of October 2024, he has around 110 million subscribers and is the fourth most-subscribed non-corporation YouTuber.

Every minute, 300 hours of videos are uploaded to YouTube, and 5 billion videos are watched every day. In August 2014, Variety wrote that YouTubers are more popular than mainstream celebrities among U.S. teens. Advertisers, in an effort to reach teenagers and millennials who do not watch regular television and movies, have started contacting YouTubers and other internet personalities.

YouTube's AdSense program enables creators to earn money from advertisements. AdSense has certain requirements—a YouTuber must have more than 1,000 subscribers, live in an eligible country, and have more than 4,000 hours of watch time within a year to be eligible.

=== Lifecasters ===
Lifecasting is streaming continuous live video of a person's daily life. This often is in the form of first-person video from a wearable camera but can also be from cameras directed at the person or ubiquitous cameras where the person lives.

The first person to do lifecasting was Steve Mann whose experiments with wearable computing and streaming video in the early 1980s led to Mann continuously transmitted his everyday life 24 hours a day, seven days a week starting in 1994. Jennifer Ringley's JenniCam (1996–2004) attracted mass media attention, as noted by Cnet: "JenniCam, beginning in 1996, was the first really successful 'lifecasting' attempt." In early 2007, Justin Kan founded Justin.tv, a platform for live video streaming online. By the fall of 2007, Justin.tv had expanded to nearly 700 channels, generating 1,650 hours of daily programming.

=== Micro-celebrities ===
A micro-celebrity, also known as a micro-influencer, is a person famous within a niche group of users on a social media platform. Micro-celebrities often present themselves as public figures. The concept of the micro-celebrity was originally developed by Theresa Senft in her 2008 book, Camgirls: Celebrity and Community in the Age of Social Networks. According to Senft, the concept of the micro-celebrity "is best understood as a new style of online performance that involves people 'amping up' their popularity over the Web using technologies like video, blogs and social networking sites". A micro-celebrity is also known as "a form of identity linked almost exclusively to the internet, characterizing a process by which people express, create and share their identities online". However, micro-celebrities differ from more traditional forms of celebrities associated with Hollywood stars because a micro-celebrity's popularity is often directly linked to their audience, and the audience comes to expect a certain degree of authenticity and transparency.

The Internet allows the masses to wrest control of fame from traditional media, creating micro-celebrities with the click of a mouse.

— David Weinberger of the Harvard Berkman Center for Internet and Society

A micro-celebrity within the furry fandom is called a popufur. Similarly, a micro-celebrity within the brony fandom is called horse famous.

=== Viral video star ===
A viral video star is a person (or people) who became well known primarily through their being in a video that went viral. Viral videos are videos that become popular through a viral process of Internet sharing, primarily through video sharing websites such as YouTube as well as social media and email. For a video to be shareable or spreadable, it must focus on the social logics and cultural practices that have enabled and popularized these new platforms. Examples of viral video stars are the CPDRC Dancing Inmates (best known for their Thriller video) and Star Wars Kid.

=== Wanghong ===
Wanghong (Chinese: 网红; pinyin: wǎnghóng; lit. 'Internet fame') is the Chinese version of Internet stardom. The wanghong economy is a Chinese digital economy based on influencer marketing in social media. Some wanghong celebrities generate profits via retail or e-commerce, through attracting the attention of their followers. Internet celebrities have become a popular phenomenon in China. For example, Sister Furong (Fúróng Jiějiě, 芙蓉姐姐) received worldwide notoriety and fame for her self-promotion efforts through online posts. According to CBN Data, a commercial data company affiliated with Alibaba Group, the Chinese internet personality economy was estimated to be worth CN¥58 billion (US$8.4 billion) in 2016, more than China's total cinema box office revenue in 2015.

There are two main business models in the wanghong economy: social media advertising, and online retail. In the online retailing business model, e-commerce-based wanghong use social media platforms to sell self-branded products to potential buyers among followers via Chinese customer-to-customer (C2C) websites, such as Taobao. Internet celebrities may promote their products by modeling for their shops by posting pictures or videos of themselves wearing the clothes or accessories they sell, or giving makeup or fashion tips.

Zhang Dayi (张大奕)—one of China's best-known wanghong according to BBC News, with 4.9 million followers on Sina Weibo—has an online shop on Taobao, reportedly earning CN¥300 million (US$46 million) per year. This is comparable to the US$21 million made by Fan Bingbing (范冰冰), a top Chinese actress. Li Ziqi (李子柒), a celebrity food blogger with more than 16 million followers on Weibo, has inspired many bloggers to post similar content on traditional Chinese cooking and crafts.

Censorship in China has created an independent social media ecosystem that has become successful in its own way. For every Western social media platform, there is a comparable Chinese version; Chinese social media platforms, however, generate revenue differently. The greatest difference between Chinese internet celebrities and their Western counterparts is that the profits generated by Chinese celebrities can be immense. Unlike YouTube, which takes 45% of advertising revenue, Sina Weibo, one of the largest Chinese social media platforms, is not involved in advertising, which allows internet celebrities to be more independent. The monthly income of Chinese influencers can exceed CN¥10 million (US$1.5 million).

=== Net idols ===
In Japan, a specific type of internet personality is known as a net idol (ネットアイドル, Netto aidoru), a sub-category of the idol industry in Japan. Net idols first emerged in the 1990s through personal websites and blogs when internet became more accessible, with some selling personal merchandise such as photo books through their websites. Around March 2007, dance covers (known as odottemita (踊ってみた; lit. "I tried dancing")) became popular in video-sharing websites such as Niconico, which in turn led people into performing choreographed dances from anime series and idol groups. Notable creators of dance covers, known as odorite (踊り手), who later debuted as idols include Kozue Aikawa from Danceroid, Beckii Cruel, and Keekihime.

=== VTubers ===
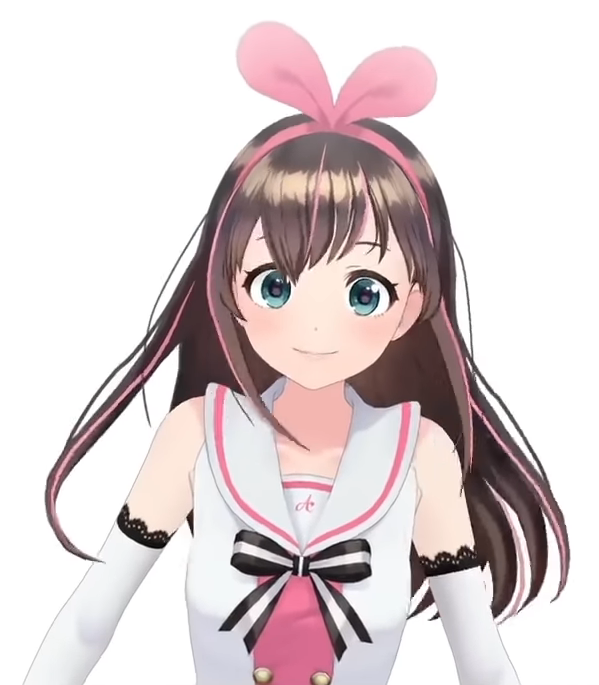
Kizuna AI, the first VTuber

VTubers or virtual YouTubers are entertainers that use digital 3D model avatars that are computer generated. VTubers originated from Japan, beginning in the early 2010s, and have risen in popularity in the 2020s. The first virtual YouTuber was Ami Yamato, who debuted on May 18, 2011; the first VTuber who had used the phrase "virtual Youtuber" is Kizuna AI, who began entertaining in 2016. The appeal of VTubers is similar to a real person, except the entertainer may choose to remain anonymous through their VTuber persona. The 2D anime virtual avatars appealed to many Japanese fans and popularity began to spread internationally. In October 2021, there has been reported to be 16,000 VTubers around the world.

VTubers function in a similar fashion to YouTubers and streamers, with some VTubers being music artists. These VTubers that were music artists or broadcast their musical talent would be dubbed "VSinger" (virtual singer). Agencies such as Hololive and Nijisanji, scout and hire these VTubers to aid in marketing and build popularity. Their trademark character being the VTuber avatar or a 2D anime form of that character on the album covers, allowing recognition of the avatar and for the agency.

== Income ==
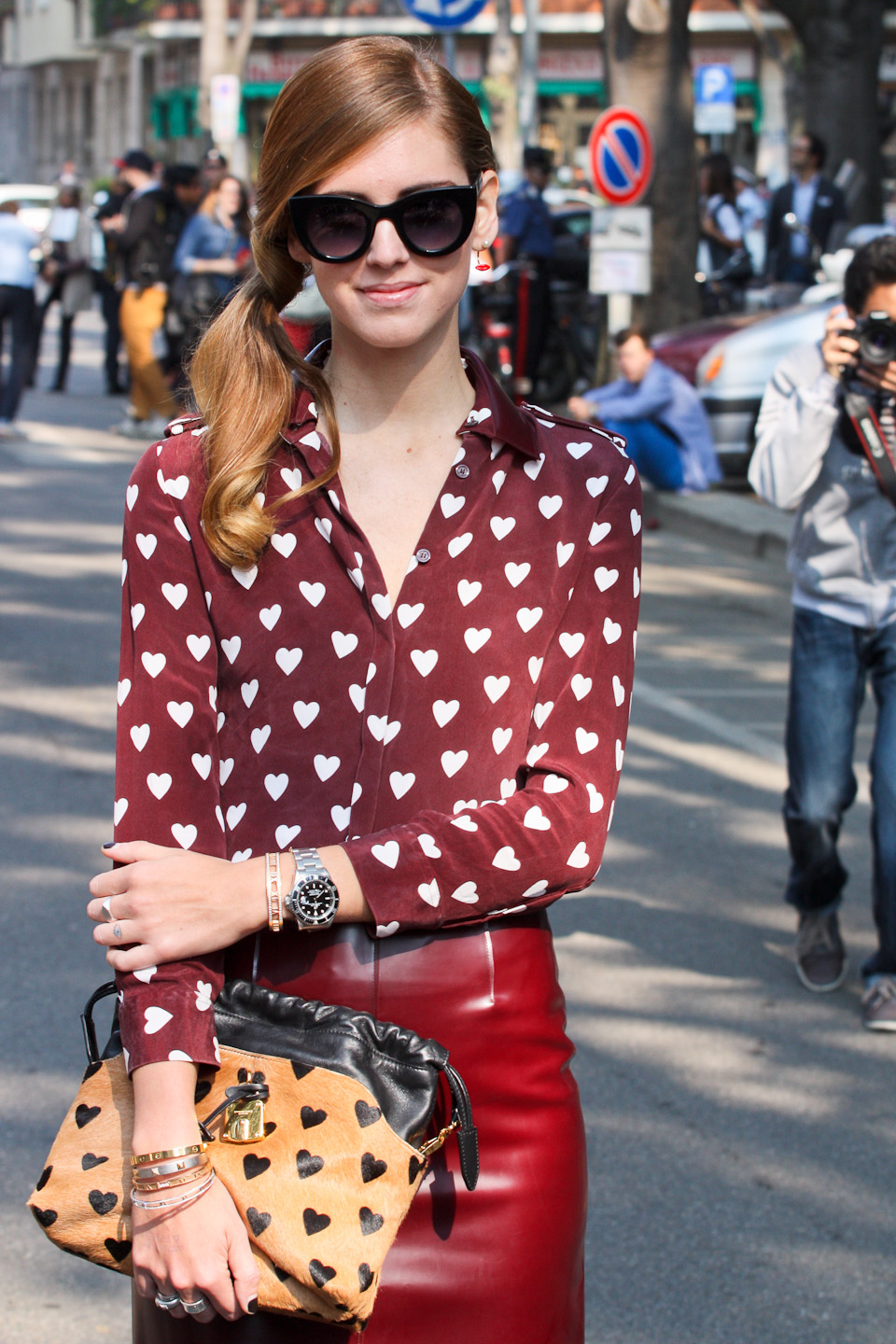
Chiara Ferragni is a fashion influencer and blogger known for her sponsored fashion posts.

Influencers can make money in various ways, but most of them earn money from endorsements or sponsorships. Social media influencers can use their fame to promote products or experiences to their followers, as a method of providing credibility to products.

Influencers can also expand their source of revenue by creating their own products or merchandise to sell. In recent years, influencers have also begun monetizing their audiences through educational platforms such as RJPL Academy and Graphy, which allows creators to sell online courses and host live masterclasses for their followers. By doing this, and by using their platform to promote their products to an established audience, influencers can earn money by developing their own reputable brands. Bloggers can feature sponsored posts in social media to make profits. For instance, fashion blogger Chiara Ferragni started as an online blogger, and then gained millions of followers on Instagram. She later created her brand, the Chiara Ferragni Collection. Like many other Instagram celebrities, Ferragni started by charging money per post for promoting brands. She earns revenue from promotional Instagram posts and the sale of her own products. In 2020, a report by venture-capital firm SignalFire stated that the economy spawned by internet creators was the "fastest-growing type of small business".

Additionally, marginalized communities are able to pursue influencing as a profession if they live in countries where it is harder to get a job or achieve higher education because of their backgrounds.

== Cancel culture ==
Cancel culture is a form of ostracism where an individual is no longer watched and excluded from social or professional circles because of certain past or present actions or allegations. The act may occur on social media platforms or in person. Cancel culture is a common term among internet celebrities where they may lose their source of income, fans, or reputation because of their controversial actions. For example, Beauty Guru YouTuber Jeffree Star has faced many allegations of misconduct in his career, which include cyberbullying and vocally expressing racist remarks. On July 10, 2020, the makeup brand Morphe cut ties and ceased all makeup collaborations with Jeffree Star because his problematic past had resurfaced. The year before that, Kuwaiti celebrity Sondos Alqattan was "cancelled" for criticising Filipinos. As a result of this, some brands cut ties with her.

== Interacting with fans ==
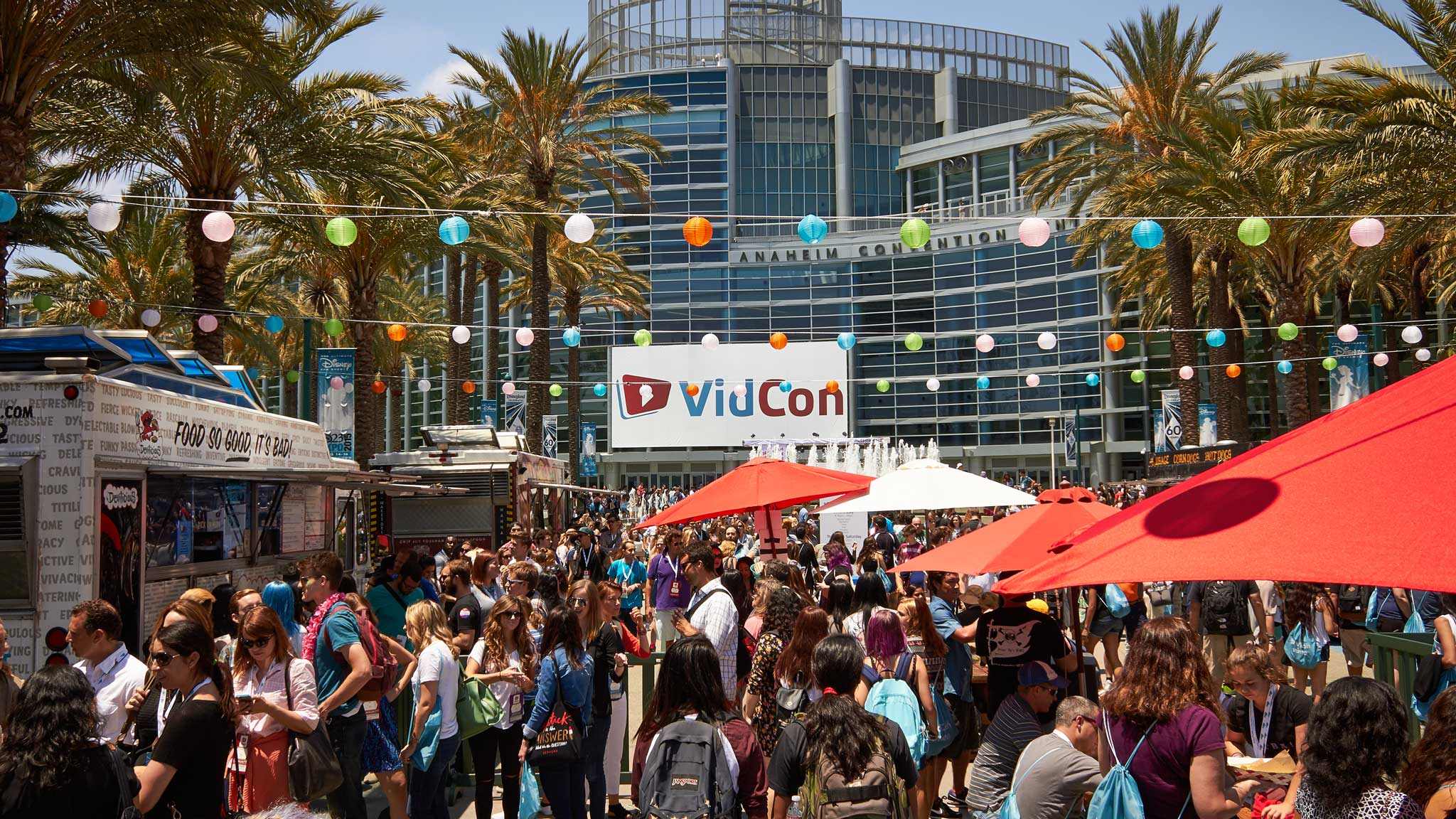
VidCon 2017

Meetups are often a way internet celebrities interact with fans in real life. Occasionally, an internet personality might organize a meetup and invite fans to meet them at a certain place and time without proper organization. This can attract crowds of fans, causing disorderly or even unsafe situations. For example, Tanacon was an organization produced in collaboration with talent manager Michael Weist involving a group of internet celebrities who were set to meet paying fans, but did not follow through. Because of the disorganized setup, the meetup resulted in chaos.

Alternatively, events can be organized at a venue with security personnel. VidCon is an annual organized video conference designed for people interested in online videos. It invites internet content creators to participate in events for paying fans, such as performances, panels, and meet-and-greets.

== Effect on fans ==
Internet celebrities can draw in a devoted crowd of fans whether their reach is small or wide. A scholarly article published from Thammasat University in Thailand explains that the younger generation is becoming more attracted to the path of fame compared to the typical intellectual development and financial security route.

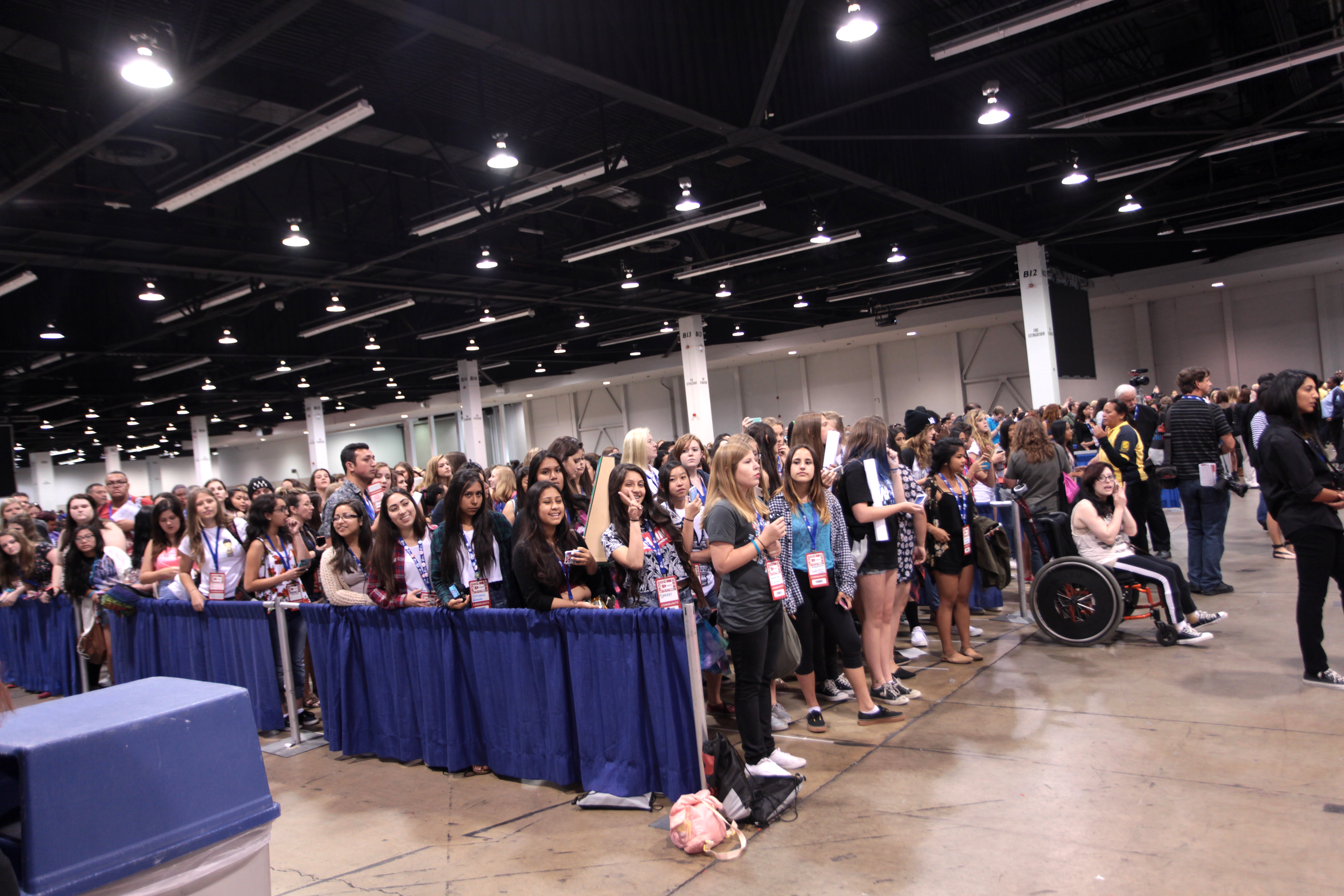
Fans at the 2014 VidCon event where hundreds of individuals wait to see their favorite internet personality YouTubers

Those who closely follow the lives of internet celebrities are more likely to develop psychological difficulties such as anxiety, depression, and dissociation. Although many internet celebrities appreciate the support and loyalty of their viewers and fans, the dedication to their lives can sometimes be intense. Fans may develop extreme behaviors or attitudes towards their favorite celebrities that can be identified as obsessive or may sometimes result to criminal behavior. The younger crowd are also being impacted through seeing their internet celebrities on different social media platforms. The Journal of Behavioral Addictions published by Akademiai Kiado evaluates a study that was done on Hungarian adolescents demonstrate these effects. The research found that the desire for fame on the internet was negatively associated with self-acceptance and potentially result to materialism and the desire for social recognition.

Internet celebrities are also able to influence fans through creating parasocial relationships with their audiences. For example, Kim Kardashian frequently creates the appearance of authenticity through harnessing the emotions of her audience. In Lueck's (2012) study they find that 60% of her Facebook advertising contains an "embedded emotional/transformational story".

== See also ==
- Celebrity culture
- Internet activism
- Internet Hall of Fame
- Kid influencer
- List of Internet phenomena
- Online streamer
- Role model
- Social media marketing
- Usenet celebrity
- Virtual influencer
