= Heard Well =

American music label

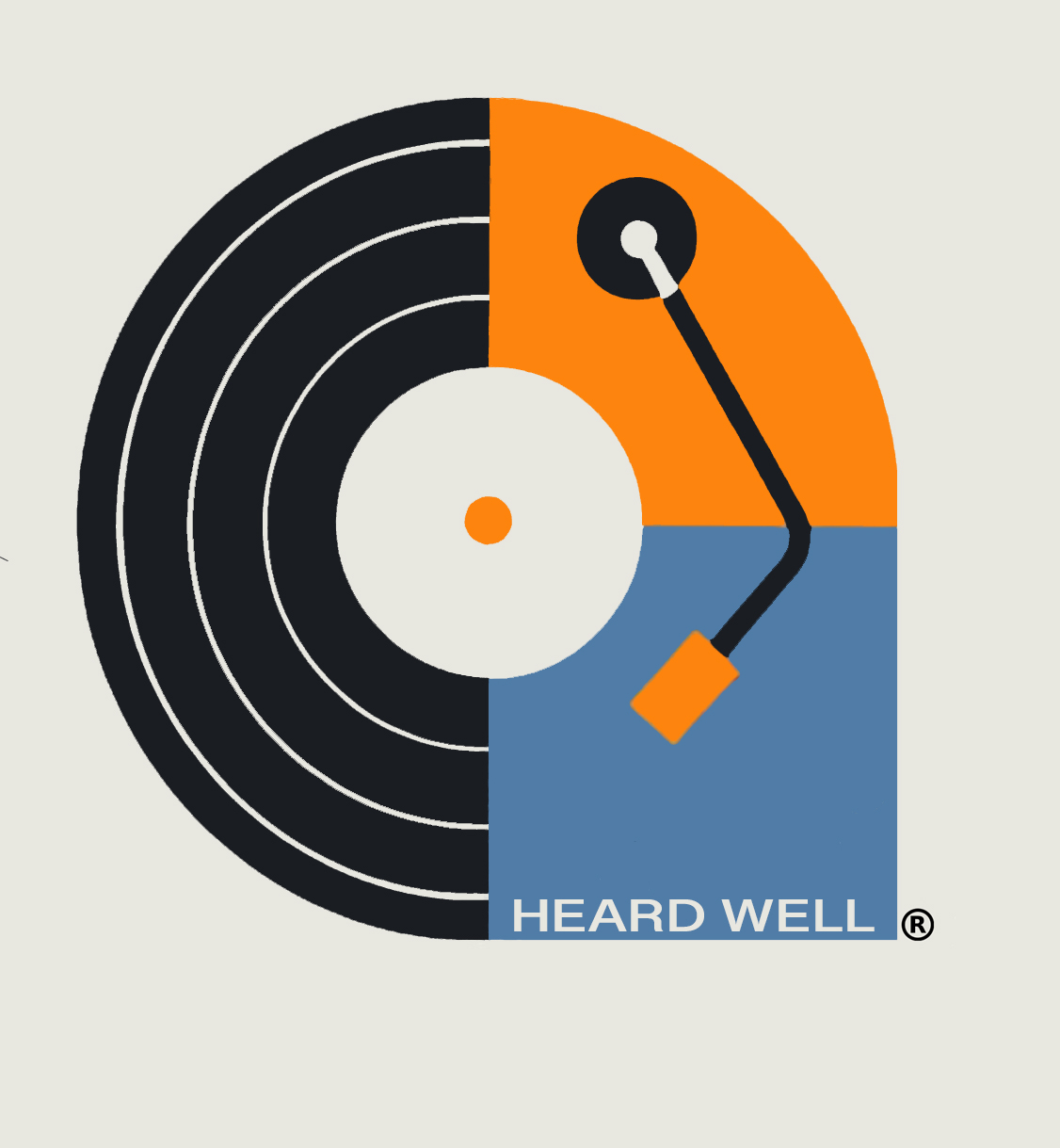
- Founded: 2015
- Founder: Jeremy Wineberg; Andrew Graham; Connor Franta
- Distributor: The Orchard (company)
- Genre: Various
- Country of origin: United States
- Location: Los Angeles, California
- Official website: www.heardwell.com

Heard Well is an American music label founded in 2015 by Jeremy Wineberg, Andrew Graham and Connor Franta. The label focuses exclusively on producing compilation albums featuring undiscovered artists as curated by digital influencers and celebrities.

== Overview ==
Heard Well works with social influencers and celebrities to curate compilation albums of their favorite music. After licensing the music, the label, in tandem with the influencer, brings it to market in both digital and physical form. The label is the first music company powered by social tastemakers and their communities.

== History ==
In November 2014, music industry veteran and Opus Label founder Jeremy Wineberg approached Connor Franta's then-talent manager and later CAA agent, Andrew Graham. to release music compilations featuring social media creators. Andrew Graham's client Connor Franta was the first YouTube creator to release a compilation album titled Crown, through Jeremy Wineberg's company Opus Label, a music licensing and distribution company that partnered with brands and content creators, including Fred Segal, Perez Hilton, Juicy Couture, and Sony Music Publishing, distributing music collections to a broad digital audience. Crown went on to become one of the top 20 best-selling pop albums of 2014 on iTunes. Subsequently, Franta released a second compilation album several months later.

By July 2015, Jeremy Wineberg approached Graham and Franta to formalize the project by founding Heard Well as a music label. One month later, Franta produced and released the label's first album, Common Culture, Vol. 3. In 2015, Heard Well created the soundtrack for Gayby Baby, an Australian documentary about marriage equality. That same year, Heard Well produced an album by Anthony Quintal (a.k.a. Lohanthony) entitled "Landscapes". In June 2016, Heard Well signed author, activist and podcast host Tyler Oakley to create a 13-track compilation album called Pride Jams, which celebrated LGBT Pride month. As of August 2016, each album released by Heard Well charted in the Billboard Top 200, and sold thousands of copies.

In April 2017, Heard Well launched Heard Well Radio with online radio company TuneIn. By May 2017, Heard Well had signed twelve of YouTube's most subscribed to personalities, with an average following of 3.8 million people. Signees include Oakley, JC Caylen, Amanda Steele, Tom Cassell and others.

== Creators ==
- Tom Cassell
- JC Caylen
- Gabby Douglas
- Tyler Oakley
- Anthony Quintal
- Amanda Steele
- Tanner Braungardt
- Andrea Russett
- The Dolan Twins
- Annie LeBlanc
- LUKA
- Camille Kostek
