= Bobby J =

American singer-songwriter

BOBBYSWORLD
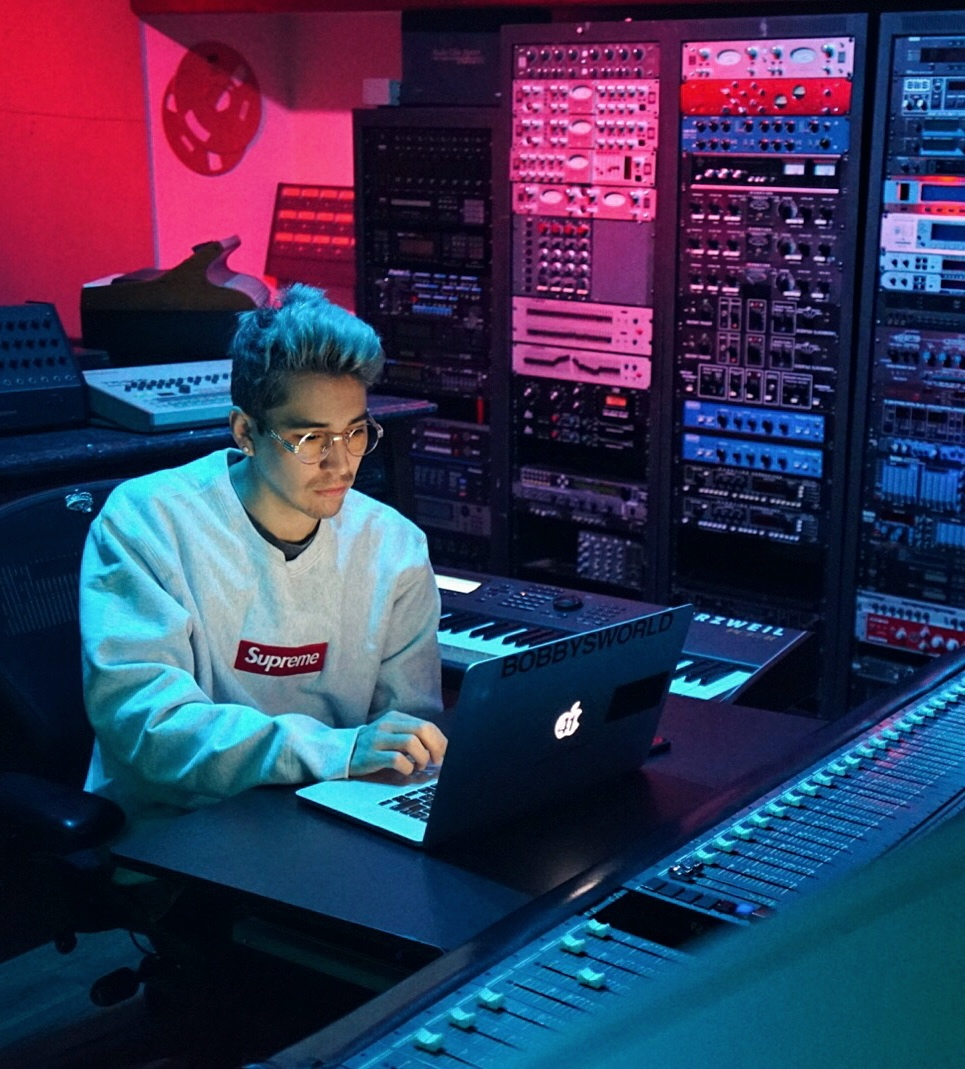

Background information
- Also known as: BOBBYSWORLD
- Born: Bobby J: San Diego; California
- Genres: Mexiton; Latin; Latin Trap; Latin Pop; Hip Hop; Pop; Rap
- Occupations: Recording Artist; Record Producer; Songwriter; Vocal Producer; Video Producer; Entrepreneur; Record Label Executive
- Instruments: Vocals; Guitar; Drums; Percussion; Keys
- Years active: 2005 - Present
- Labels: Mexiversal Music Group

Bobby J, also known professionally as BOBBYSWORLD, is an American singer, songwriter, producer, record executive, entrepreneur, and CEO of the record label Mexiversal Music Group (MMG), distributed by global music distribution company INgrooves (a subsidiary of Universal Music Group). He describes his music as "Mexitón". Mexiton (mexi·tone, mex·ee·tone), also known as Mexitón (Spanish), is a Mexican-American & Latin genre derived from Mexican, Urban, Cumbia, and Reggaeton influences. Vocals include rapping and singing, typically in Spanglish.

== Early life ==
Bobby J was born in San Diego city, California, and was raised a Catholic-Christian. He began singing and performing music at various churches throughout the week. Bobby J became a professional DJ at the age of 12, performing for school dances, corporate events, and private clients such as Walmart, Supercuts, Horn Blower Cruises MDR, and Jr. Seau of the San Diego Chargers. He is a Helix Charter High School alumni and was a section leader of Helix's drum line, symphony, orchestra, and marching bands. Bobby J played football and golf alongside Heisman Trophy winners Reggie Bush and Alex Smith.

== Career ==
In 2012, Bobby J began writing and producing records out of San Diego's recording studio Night Sky Sound alongside CEO, keyboardist/composer, and record producer Stephen Donato.

In 2013, Bobby J quickly gained wider recognition as a songwriter and producer with multiple successful releases for artists Trevor Moran and Snoop Dogg. The song "Someone" written for artist and YouTuber Trevor Moran topped the charts in the United States and peaked at #1 on the US Billboard Trending 140. The future release of Moran's debut EP in 2014 (with songs Slay and XIAT written and produced by Bobby J) charted at number 1 on US Heat and number 17 on the US Indie Charts.

Between the years of 2013 and 2015, Bobby J wrote and produced many records for both indie and popular artists. He also worked on several records as a ghost producer.

In August 2015, Bobby J began working on an album with YouTube sensation Ricky Dillon. On the album (titled "GOLD " ) was the song "Problematic" written and produced by Bobby J featuring Snoop Dogg. The Album hit the iTunes charts in Canada at number 15, the iTunes charts in the US at number 21 and the iTunes charts in Australia at number 45. GOLD also charted on Billboard Independent Albums at number 10. The album GOLD also includes a special acoustic version of the song "Ordinary" showcasing the works of both producers Charlie Puth and Bobby J.

Bobby J is known to have worked on records featuring both Artists and YouTubers such as Snoop Dogg, Ne-Yo, Lil Wayne, Sean Paul, Flo Rida, 2 Chainz, Charlie Puth, Black Jeezus, Inanna Sarkis, Ricky Dillon, Kyle Massey, Maxso, Meg MayBaby DeAngelis, and Trevor Moran, Ona, Danielle Cohn, RuPaul's Drag Race Stars Shangela Laquifa Wadley, Alyssa Edwards, Laganja Estranja, and alongside mixing engineer Christopher “Tito JustMusic” Trujillo, who engineered on the Grammy Nominated Ariana Grande album “Dangerous Woman”. Tito is known for working with acts such as Busta Rhymes, Fifth Harmony, Stitches and Dj Khaled.

In 2018, Bobby J created SZWORLDTOUR, a management, development and branding company. He has also been spotted through various social media sources in studios working with artists like Kyle Massey, Hana Giraldo, Rich The Kid, OG Maco, Zay Hilfiger, Kristen Hancher, Hailee Lautenbach, Joey Graceffa, Ona, and Elijah Daniel.

In January 2019, the BOBBYSWORLD name and brand emerged. Various records by independent recording artists have surfaced with "Prod by BOBBYSWORLD" attached. Releases feature his new tag/deliverable "En el mundo del Bobby". In February, Bobby J launched independent record label "Mexiversal Music Group" (MMG) which is distributed through Ingrooves / Universal Music Group. MMG has quickly gained attention from the promotion of Mexitón music. Newly signed artists and producers also appear to be catering to various genres such as Latin, trap, hip-hop, pop, and country. On March 29, the first MMG artist "El Lobito" released his first Mexitón single titled "Mamí Mamí" produced by and featuring BOBBYSWORLD.
