= Landscape (disambiguation) =

Landscape refers to the visible features of an area of land (usually rural), or a pictorial representation of an area of countryside.

Landscape may also refer to:

== Arts and entertainment ==
- Landscape painting, an artwork depicting natural scenery
- Landscape photography
- Landscape (play), by Harold Pinter
- Landscape (film), a 2000 Slovak film directed by Martin Šulík
- Landscape (band), an English jazz-funk-synthpop band active in the 1970s and 80s
- Landscapes (band), a British melodic hardcore band formed in 2009
- Landscapes (Anthony Quintal album), a 2015 compilation album
- Landscape (Art Pepper album)
- Landscape (Kenny Barron album)
- Landscape (Landscape album)
- Landscape, by 2014 album by Peter Leitch
- Landscapes (Elroy Fritsch album)
- Landscape: Memory, a novel by Matthew Stadler
- The Landscape, a 2000 Indian animated short film by Ravi Jadhav about urbanization in India, winner of the National Film Award for Best Non-Feature Animation Film

== Other uses ==
- Landscape format, where the longer axis of printed material is horizontal (as opposed to "portrait")
- Landscape Arch, a natural rock arch in Arches National Park, Utah, United States
- The Landscape Channel, a British TV channel
- Landscape (horse), a British Thoroughbred racehorse
- Landscape (magazine), a magazine on human geography founded by J.B. Jackson
- Landscape, the journal of the Landscape Institute, a British professional body
- Landscape (software), a proprietary web service for centralized management of Ubuntu
- String theory landscape, the exponential number of compactifications in string theory

== See also ==
- Lvndscape, Dutch house music DJ
