= American outlaw =

An American outlaw is an outlaw from the United States.

American outlaw or American Outlaws may also refer to:

- The American Outlaws, the U.S. Soccer supporters' group
- American Outlaws (2001 film), an American Western
- American Outlaws (2023 film), an American mystery crime drama
- Outlaws Motorcycle Club, the American Outlaws Association, a biker club
