= Note to Self (disambiguation) =

Note to Self is an American technology podcast.

Note to Self may also refer to:

- Note to Self (book), a 2017 memoir by Connor Franta
- Note to Self, a 2008 album by a cappella group Voices in Your Head
- "Note to Self:", a 2004 song by Owen from the album I Do Perceive
- "Note to Self", a 2005 single by From First to Last from the album Dear Diary, My Teen Angst Has a Bodycount
- "Note to Self", a 2014 song by J. Cole from the album 2014 Forest Hills Drive
