= Wanghong economy =

Chinese social media economy based on influencer marketing

The wanghong economy refers to the Chinese digital economy based on influencer marketing through social media platforms. Wanghong (Chinese: 网红; pinyin: wǎnghóng; lit. 'internet fame') is the Chinese term for internet celebrity. Chinese wanghong celebrities attract the attention of internet users, which can translate into profit through e-commerce and online advertising.

According to CBN Data, a commercial data company affiliated with Alibaba, the Chinese internet celebrity economy was estimated to be worth ¥58 billion RMB (US$8.4 billion) in 2016, which is more than China's total movie box office revenue in 2015.

== Business model ==
=== Online retail ===
Wanghong celebrities use social media platforms to sell their self-branded products to their followers via Chinese customer-to-customer (C2C) websites such as Taobao. These celebrities promote their products by posting pictures or videos of themselves wearing their merchandise or giving makeup or fashion tips. Chinese e-commerce internet celebrities serve as key opinion leaders (KOLs) (known in English as "influencers") in online retail. As influencers, wanghong can shape their followers' fashion and lifestyle choices. To emulate their favorite wanghong, followers become loyal consumers.

In this business model, consumers are essential in driving the products and helping brands thrive. Through social media, consumers can impact the success or failure of online stores, products, and brands. These types of consumers are considered prosumers or "professional customers." New forms of consumption disentangle themselves little by little from rigid social stratification and end up being governed by fashion trends and experts who provide good taste and chic outfits.

Zhang Dayi (张大奕) is one of China's best-known wanghong according to BBC News, with 4.9 million followers on Sina Weibo as of 2016. Zhang has an online shop on Taobao, through which she reportedly earned ¥300 million RMB (US$46 million) per year, compared to US$21 million made by Fan Bingbing (范冰冰), a top Chinese actress.

In 2015, Alibaba's Singles' Day sales reached a record of $14.3 billion, with most revenue coming from its online retail platform, Taobao; five of Taobao's top 10 best-performing shops belonged to wanghong.

=== Social media advertising ===
The foundation of social media advertising is content, which is central to the wanghong economy. Wanghong use free original information to attract netizens' attention and influence their habits. These internet celebrities have broken the monopoly of traditional media. They have thousands of followers and can influence purchasing behavior.

Products in the wanghong economy are usually advertised in two ways:

- Paying internet celebrities to advertise products: When internet celebrities have enough followers, some companies may contact them for advertising. For example, in 2016, inserting an advertising video in Papi Jiang's (papi 酱) internet video program cost 22 million yuan. Some manufacturers will set up new brands designed around internet celebrities. The manufacturers supply the product and rely on the influencer to market the products to their fans. For instance, Zhang Dayi (张大奕), a famous fashion internet celebrity on Sina Weibo, reports her brand's annual sales are over 1 million pounds.
- Styling official company accounts as influencer account: For example, Bowu (博物) Magazine has 6.2 million followers, Gugong Taobao (故宫淘宝) has 670,000 followers, and Haier (a consumer electronics company) has 580,000 followers. These company accounts will post advertisements, but also focus on attracting new followers. They will communicate with their followers and create topics to encourage discussion. An aforementioned example is Bowu Magazine, which is a nature and science magazine. To imitate an internet celebrity, the magazine identified as different species for netizens from a first-person perspective, attracting the attention of users. This method was a success, and the number of followers of Bowu Magazine increased dramatically from 800,000 in January 2015 to 6.2 million in March 2017. At the same time, the circulation grew from tens of thousands to 220,000 in 2015.

Different wanghong celebrities have different styles, as do their fans or followers. This makes it is easy to differentiate the needs and characteristics of different groups. Then companies can choose target audiences for their product. To satisfy the needs of targeted customers, internet celebrities can enhance the accuracy of advertisements. This differs from traditional celebrities because followers may feel that influencers are closer and more accessible, so more followers can be converted into buyers.

=== Live advertising ===
'Live+E-mall+Wanghong' is a new advertising model in the wanghong economy. This advertising model can create a platform for followers to communicate with Wanghong. Ads can be integrated into the program's content so it is less obvious to viewers. For example, in 2016, Baicaowei (百草味), a snack company, increased sales fivefold during the 618 shopping festival compared with the previous year after working with a famous wanghong called Shenman (沈曼) who is from YY, one of the largest livestreaming platforms in China.

== Digital marketing ==
Digital marketing is used in many aspects of the creation and development of a wanghong.

Companies use internet celebrities to attract attention or to create content. Internet celebrities have talents and skills involving beauty, fashion, food, life, humor, education, and music. They develop a fan base who follow that wanghong's words and actions. Since the commercial value of internet celebrity has been recognized, the commercial production of new Internet celebrities has also appeared. There are professional internet celebrity "packaging" companies to manage potential and current wanghong. These professional internet celebrity companies can transform celebrities' fans into consumers.

Today, internet celebrities are often viewed as personal brands, which can be produced and developed by effective marketing.

=== Digital marketing strategy ===
A digital marketing strategy involving a wanghong can be divided into the following steps. In the creation phase, the company locates an internet celebrity, considering the characteristics of potential candidates and their target audience. The next step is to increase awareness and influence. Internet celebrities should accumulate a large number of fans in this step. The ultimate goal of the wanghong economy is to transfer Internet celebrity awareness into revenue. Therefore, the more loyal fans an internet celebrity has, the higher the income they may generate. After the internet celebrities have been created and have amassed fans, the marketing strategy focuses on protecting their public image, avoiding the celebrity's losing fans.

=== Digital marketing methods ===
The media of digital marketing can be mainly divided into Social Networks, video websites, search engines, news portals and e-commerce websites. For social network websites like Facebook, Twitter, Instagram and Weibo, an internet celebrity can cooperate with the site to push their content to their target audience. As for search engines like Google, Bing and Baidu, internet celebrities can place ads to appear in related searches or rank higher in search results. Video websites like YouTube and electronic business platforms like Taobao are also important ways to market internet celebrities. The advertising revenue from video websites and sales from an online shop are the primary ways Internet celebrities make money. They can spend money to promote their videos or stores on a website's homepage to attract more viewers.

Moreover, Internet celebrities are also a type of self-media, as they are a widely seen communication channel. These celebrities can spread messages not only to their fans, but their fans can also carry their messages on to others. If an internet celebrity company manages multiple wanghong, the different wanghong can recommend each other's content to their fans.

== Global context ==
=== Digital ===
A report from the China Internet Network Information Center showed that in 2015, Chinese people spent 3.75 hours online daily. By June 2014, there were 632 million Internet users in the country and a penetration rate of 46.9%.

The rapid uptake of smart devices in China is critical because it created a foundation for developing the digital consumer market. There were 80 million smartphones in circulation in China in 2010, which skyrocketed to 580 million units in 2013 and is expected to increase further to over 1 billion units by 2016. There are 650 million mobile internet users, 350 million smartphone subscribers and 290 million active WeChat users.

The internet can create markets for products and service offerings that did not exist. A report from the McKinsey Global Institute says that E-commerce can change the retail sector, leading to greater consumption for these services. These digital consumers can have more sophisticated consumption habits than Chinese consumers in the past. To be successful, enterprises can attempt to understand their customers and offer a unique experience, which may require getting insights about them.

=== Youth consumption ===
According to a 2015 study of internet users The Post-90s people of China depend on smartphones, appreciate a diversity of tastes, rely highly on social media, and are keen online shoppers. They pursue youthful fashion, are self-centered, are rational consumers, desire novelty, thirst for knowledge, try to outdo others, and are impatient. They have strong consumption desires. They prefer new advertising methods over traditional marketing.

Wanghong were perceived to be more authentic and less distant compared to conventional celebrities by the post-90s generation. Overwhelmed by the variety of products available, wanghong act as opinion leaders in their unique fields. Through videos on makeup and fashion and by giving tips and advice, wanghong play a role in the purchasing process and act more like an authority on such products.

== Chinese consumer culture ==
=== Demographics and consumption ===
Increasing demand for consumption in China is caused by two major factors. One is an increase in population and the other is growth of the economy and higher disposable income. Average GDP per capita rose at over 9.8% annually for 30 consecutive years, enabling China to become the second largest economy in the world in 2010. As China's living standards rose with economic growth, Chinese consumers' shopping habits have changed, and more consumers are able and willing to spend more on goods and services.

Wanghong online shops have low prices and fashion styles that appeal to Chinese consumer psychology and mass consumption. With the potential of more than 1.3 billion consumers, China's domestic market presents buying power.

=== Culture ===
==== Collectivism ====
There are some characteristics of Chinese culture that influence consumption and could explain attitudes towards internet celebrities. Collectivism is a feature of Chinese society. People in collectivist societies will adhere more easily to group standards than people in individualistic societies. The second feature is that of a polychronic culture. People in a polychronic culture enjoy social harmony and generally emphasize relationships more than tasks. According to research, "online social interaction is important in a collectivistic culture such as China." Culture may be the strongest determinant factor of differences in customer online social networking and online shopping behavior across cultures. People holding these cultural values generally rely more on word-of-mouth from friends and family. They are more likely to communicate and share information on social media. They also tend to look for experts to get advice for important decision-making and emotional support. These characteristics contribute to the development of opinion leaders who have a significant number of followers (like internet celebrities) and who may influence a brand.

==== Symbolic value ====
Symbolic consumption has become a significant trend driven by young consumers. Products are viewed as possessing meaning beyond their tangible presence. Consumers view products as symbols and imbue them with attributes beyond their immediate physical nature. Therefore, consumers buy products not only for functional benefits but also for a specific meaning and additional potential pleasure. Through the consumption process, consumers find individual self-identities. This consuming behavior also becomes a symbolic activity.

If the consumer has options, they will choose to consume things with particular symbolic meanings. For example, using recycled envelopes may symbolize care for the environment, attending classical concerts may convey fine taste, supporting LGBT rights may signify open-mindedness, and so on.

On social media, wanghong create tags of "fashion/chic/individuality/entertainment/beautiful" as a personal identification system, coding them in various literal text, audio, or video ways. Netizens decode those symbolic activities by consuming according to their preference. Therefore, consumers not only purchase goods but also get psychological pleasure. For instance, some consumers get visual pleasure. They are attracted by the physical appearance of a wanghong, or get auditory pleasure listening to a wanghong sing.

== Future and concern ==
According to venture capitalist Mary Meeker's 2016 internet trends report, change in internet trends is speeding up and millennials' consumer consciousness is rising. Content is the most valuable way a wanghong has to increase followers and traffic, which differs from traditional celebrities. While a wanghong's primary value to companies is their content, the value of a conventional celebrity is their name recognition. This means that traditional celebrities can speak for a product without producing content, but wanghong cannot. To attract followers' attention, some wanghong use what is considered by some to be vulgar, wealth-obsessed, or sexually violent content. Some see this as negatively influencing the morality of society and young people's attitudes towards consumption. At the end of 2016, the Chinese Ministry of Culture released the "Measures for the Administration of Online Performance Operating Activities" to regulate market order and promote what the Ministry sees as healthy and orderly development of the online performance industry. Wanghong need more sustained motivation for the output of content. If they keep innovating their content and coming out with new ideas, they will retain their value and continue attracting followers.

According to McKinsey's report about Chinese consumer trends published in 2016, even though China's economic growth is slowing down and consumer confidence is trending down, the Chinese consumer market is still expanding. China is in the process of transforming into a consumer society. Consumers are shifting "from products to services and from mass to premium segments", and more and more of them are starting to "seek a more balanced lifestyle where experiences take priority." Wanghong are also transforming from the role of salesmen to that of a substitute user, providing their direct, authentic experience of products to their followers.
