= Shovel Buddies =

- Digital release poster
- Directed by: Simon Atkinson; Adam Townley
- Written by: Jason Mark Hellerman
- Produced by: Don Dunn; Benjamin Forkner; Matt Kaplan; Ali Itri; Shauna Phelan; Brian Robbins; Dean Schnider
- Starring: Alex Neustaedter; Kian Lawley; Bella Thorne; Anton Starkman
- Cinematography: Jason McCormick
- Edited by: Jonnie Scarlett; Brendan Walsh
- Music by: Germaine Franco
- Production companies: 20th Century Fox; Awesomeness Films; Film 360; Entertainment 360
- Distributed by: Awesomeness Films; 20th Century Fox
- Release dates: March 14, 2016 (SXSW); October 11, 2016 (United States)
- Running time: 85 minutes
- Country: United States
- Language: English

Shovel Buddies is a 2016 American drama film written by Jason Mark Hellerman, directed by Simon Atkinson and Adam Townley. It stars Alex Neustaedter, Kian Lawley, Bella Thorne and Anton Starkman. The film had its world premiere at South by Southwest on March 14, 2016. The film was released through video on demand on October 11, 2016, by Awesomeness Films and 20th Century Fox.

== Plot ==
Jimmy and his brother Lump, and Dan mourn their recently deceased best friend Sammy from leukemia. At Sammy's funeral, however, Dan becomes jealous of Jimmy, blaming him for his death and Sammy's family wants his body to be cremated. The three receive a video of Sammy's will and testament from his phone, saying that he wants to be buried with his favorite football jersey. They notify Sammy's parents of their son's final will, but the parents do not believe that Sammy made the video willingly.

Not giving up on fulfilling their best friend's will, Sammy's sister Kate sneaks out of her house to team up with the three and they head to the funeral home where Sammy's body is due to be cremated. They wear his jersey and retrieve Sammy's body. The funeral home's owner discovers the body was stolen and subsequently alerts the police. The four then burglarize a hardware store to acquire digging tools and head up to the hills to bury him, but because the soil is tough, the tools break, so they decide to bury Sammy at the school's stadium construction site. The four stop at a liquor shop to buy some food to eat, and a police officer comes their way and suspects them as the ones responsible for the events in the funeral home and the hardware store, though they manage to escape.

While on the road, Dan confronts Jimmy about Sammy, and their car is crashed when Jimmy swerves it to avoid the intersection when the traffic light turns red. Dan walks out carrying Sammy, and Lump's arm is injured. Kate confronts Jimmy for ignoring her after her brother's death. Jimmy convinces her that Sammy left everything that he wanted to him, and goes to find Dan to retrieve Sammy. However, Dan changes his mind, saying that he doesn't want to bury him at the stadium. After persuading Dan, he lets Jimmy carry Sammy and continues walking alone.

Jimmy is then interrogated by Sammy's father, eventually allowing Jimmy to follow his son's wishes. Jimmy steals the ambulance treating Kate and Lump. They catch Dan and head to the stadium construction site. The four say their last words to Sammy before they finally bury Sammy in peace. They rest solemnly until sunrise and Jimmy asks them "How do you guys want to get home?"

== Cast ==
- Alex Neustaedter as Jimmy Gibbons
- Kian Lawley as Dan
- Bella Thorne as Kate Harlow
- Anton Starkman as Tom "Lump" Gibbons
- James C. Burns as Ted Harlow
- Jenny Cooper as Susan Harlow
- Jeff Bosley as Stubby
- Phillip Labes as Sammy Harlow
- Roberta Bassin as Mrs. Kravitz
- Senta Burke as Officer
- Thomas F. Evans as Hardware Store Owner

== Production ==
On March 24, 2015, it was announced AwesomenessTV had acquired the script of the film which was on the 2013 blacklist. On June 1, 2015, it was announced Bella Thorne had joined the cast alongside Kian Lawley, Alex Neustaedter, Anton Starkman, James C. Burns and Philip Labes.

== Filming ==
Principal photography began on June 1, 2015 and ended on June 22, 2015.

== Release ==
The film premiered at South by Southwest on March 14, 2016. The film had its digital release on October 11, 2016.
