= Gold (Ricky Dillon album) =

Album by Ricky Dillon

Studio album by Ricky Dillon
- Released: 15 January 2016
- Recorded: 2014–2015
- Genre: Pop; pop rock; R&B
- Length: 32:28
- Label: EGR Music Group

Ricky Dillon chronology
RPD - EP (2015)	Gold (2016)

Singles from Gold
- 1. "Steal the Show" Released: 28 December 2015; 2. "Problematic" Released: 15 January 2016

Gold (stylized as G O L D) is the only studio album by American YouTube personality Ricky Dillon, released on January 15, 2016. The album features the singles, "Steal the Show" featuring American singer and YouTube personality Trevi Moran and "Problematic" featuring American rapper Snoop Dogg.

== Background ==
On December 1, 2015, Dillion announced the album through his YouTube channel, announcing the title of the album and the release date of January 15, 2016. Dillion also announced the track listing of the album by having other YouTube personalities unveil the tracks.

== Singles ==
On December 28, 2015, "Steal the Show" featuring Trevi Moran was released through digital download and a music video featuring Dillion and Moran was released the same day. The music video for second single "Problematic" was released the same day as the album. Its video features a plethora of flexible dancers and a staccato guest verse courtesy of Snoop Dogg.

== Critical reception ==
Gold was panned by critics and audiences, receiving overwhelmingly negative reviews.

== Track listing ==
No.	Title	Length
1.	"Home Sweet Home"	2:41
2.	"Don't Wanna Fall in Love"	2:48
3.	"Problematic" (featuring Snoop Dogg)	3:20
4.	"Fight and Battle"	3:43
5.	"Lottery"	3:05
6.	"Steal the Show" (featuring Trevi Moran)	3:03
7.	"Gold"	4:07
8.	"Got Your Back" (featuring Shelby Waddell)	3:00
9.	"Ordinary" (acoustic version)	3:37
10.	"Never Ending Runs" (Cesar Remix)	3:11

== Charts ==
Chart (2016)	Peak position
US Independent Albums (Billboard)	10
