= A Work in Progress (book) =

2015 memoir by Connor Franta

- Original cover art
- Author: Connor Franta
- Language: English
- Published: April 2015 (Keywords Press)
- Publication place: United States
- Media type: Print; Digital; Audiobook
- Pages: 210
- ISBN: 9781476791616

A Work in Progress is a memoir written by YouTuber and entrepreneur Connor Franta. It was published in April 2015 by Atria/Keywords Press. It centers around Franta's life, his childhood, his current life and his future aspirations. Franta went on a promotional tour for the book in the United States, United Kingdom as well as promotion during the Amplify Live Australian Tour in 2015. In May 2016, a hardcover version was made available through a public release. A second hardcover book featuring a different cover, was also released in 2016. The book was succeeded by Franta's 2017 memoir, Note to Self.

== Reception ==
The book appeared at #8 on the New York Times, Publishers Weekly, and The Times best seller lists. The book is the winner of the 2015 "Goodreads Choice Awards Best Memoir & Autobiography".

== See also ==
- YouTube
