= Sam Strike =

English actor (born 1994)

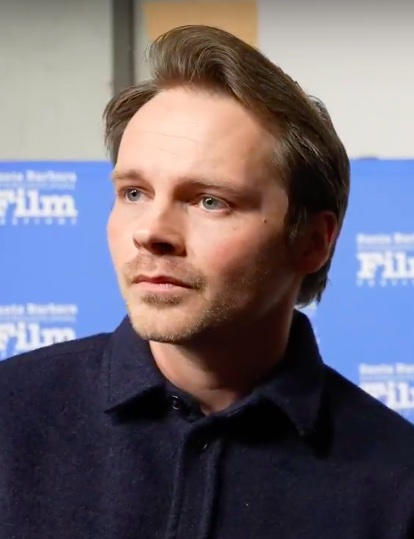
- Strike at the 2023 Santa Barbara International Film Festival
- Born: 18 January 1994 (age 32); Southend-on-Sea, Essex, England
- Occupation: Actor
- Years active: 2013–present

Sam Strike (born 18 January 1994) is an English actor. He made his acting debut in the 2013 revival of the CBBC series M.I. High, before gaining popular success playing Johnny Carter in the BBC soap opera EastEnders (2013–2014). During his stint on the latter, his character was involved in a coming out storyline, which earned him critical praise for his performance. Following his departure from EastEnders, he appeared in guest-starring roles on several television shows.

In 2017, Strike starred as the title character in the horror film Leatherface. He followed this with main roles in the film Monster Party (2018) and the television series Nightflyers (2018) and When the Streetlights Go On (2020). His subsequent film credits include American Outlaws and The Boys in the Boat (both 2023). Strike also had recurring roles in the second season of the television series Outer Range (2024) and the television series Star City (2026).

== Early life ==
Strike was born on 18 January 1994 in Southend-on-Sea, Essex, England, where he grew up with his sister. He attended the local Thorpe Hall School, and later studied acting at the South East Essex College for two years. An avid singer and guitar player, he initially wanted to be a musician growing up and performed in bands. Strike became interested in acting in secondary school, where he had his first drama lesson. He explained that he "had a natural aptitude for it" and was encouraged by his teacher to pursue this path. He then began attending adult drama classes and signed with an agent. He auditioned unsuccessfully for three years before securing his part in M.I. High. As a student, he appeared in the school productions of Oliver! as a flower seller, and Jesus Christ Superstar as Judas. He also portrayed the protagonist of the 2010 student film Stitches. At 16, he won a modelling competition organised by local newspaper The Echo.

== Career ==
=== Early roles and EastEnders (2013–2014) ===
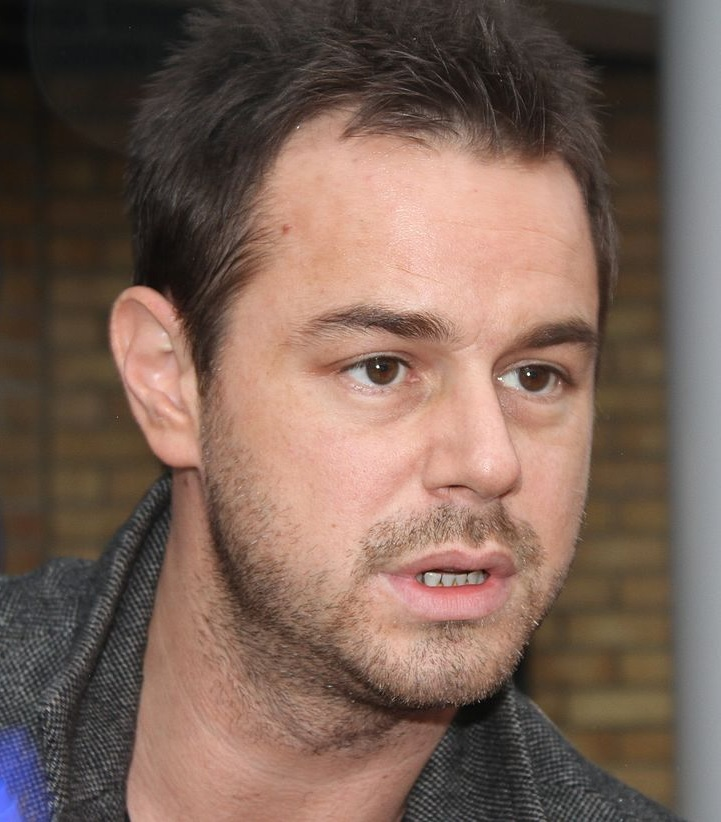
Danny Dyer (pictured) portrayed Strike's on-screen father in EastEnders. Both received praise for their performances in Strike character's coming out storyline.

Strike made his professional acting debut in 2013, playing Dan Morgan in the revival of the CBBC series M.I. High, which spanned two seasons. The same year, he was cast in the role of Johnny Carter in the BBC soap opera EastEnders. His character was introduced as part of the Carter family, and he made his first appearance on 26 December 2013. Strike's portrayal of Johnny was met with a positive reception. He received particular praise for his performance in the episode that saw his character come out to his father Mick (Danny Dyer). Paul Flynn of The Guardian wrote that both actors "delivered an exceptional, impulsive, physical reading of the ties that bond father and son, no matter what," and Attitude magazine recognised the storyline with the Media Recognition Award. Reflecting on the coming-out scene, Strike said that he was "really nervous the night it aired, because you want it to look convincing but then you want to do justice by the people that have been there and done it." He added that "it was a real proving ground for me, because it was the first time I actually had to do any proper drama acting." Discussing its impact, Strike revealed that both he and Dyer had received letters from viewers saying they had helped people come out. In 2014, he made a guest appearance in episode two of the comedy series Give Out Girls as a 15-year-old model named Luke.

On 14 November 2014, Strike announced his departure from EastEnders. Regarding his decision to leave the show, he said: "I knew from the start that I was never going to be there for 10 years. It was just a case of seeing how things went, where the character was going and how relevant he was going to be in time to come." Strike believed that "Johnny peaked quite early" due to the high-profile coming-out storyline, and he was no longer needed on the show at the time of his leaving. The character officially left the series on 23 December 2014, although Strike returned in the role for one more special appearance via Skype in an episode broadcast on Christmas Day 2014. Upon his departure, the show's executive producer, Dominic Treadwell-Collins, said that the "door is wide open" for Strike to return and that he did not plan to recast the character, hoping Strike would come back. However, when it was decided to reintroduce the character in 2016, Strike admitted that he "wasn't ready to return any time in the near future", and the role was recast.

=== Career expansion (2015–present) ===
Shortly after leaving EastEnders, Strike was cast in a starring role in the crime drama film Bonded by Blood 2, which was released in 2017. He guest-starred as David Hamilton in a two-part episode of the television series Silent Witness and as Clyde Barrow in an episode of the television series Timeless, both in 2016. In the 2017 prequel to the film The Texas Chain Saw Massacre titled Leatherface, directed by Julien Maury and Alexandre Bustillo, he played the lead role of Jackson / Leatherface. Reviewing the film for Variety, Dennis Harvey described the cast's performances as "solid", adding that "the younger actors throw themselves into the task with aplomb." On television, Strike portrayed real-life serial killer Montie Rissell in an episode of Mindhunter, also in 2017.

In 2018, Strike had main roles in the horror thriller film Monster Party, and in the Syfy series Nightflyers. Frank Scheck of The Hollywood Reporter called the former "gleefully gory and darkly funny", and singled out Strike and Virginia Gardner's performances writing that they "prove adept with the challenging physical demands placed on them." The following year, Strike appeared as Misha in the episode "1:23:45" of the HBO miniseries Chernobyl, and was cast in the lead role of Roland Deschain in the Amazon Studios adaptation of Stephen King's book series The Dark Tower. The latter was ultimately cancelled, producing only an unaired pilot.

Strike starred as Casper Tatum in the 2020 Quibi coming-of-age murder mystery series When the Streetlights Go On. The critics praised the show's "strong writing, an impressive cast, and most importantly, an intriguing mystery". Strike also appeared in a 2020 episode of the television series FBI: Most Wanted playing Ronnie Lee Bishop, and in a 2022 episode of the Netflix series The Sandman as Todd. He portrayed Ryan Dougherty in the 2023 true crime drama American Outlaws, which earned him and his co-stars an award for Best Ensemble Cast at the Boston Film Festival. In George Clooney's 2023 film adaptation of Daniel James Brown's book The Boys in the Boat, he played American rower Roger Morris. The film received mixed reviews from critics. In 2024, Strike had a recurring role of Deputy Jess Chinlund in season two of the Amazon Studios series Outer Range. In 2026, he was cast in the Apple TV series Star City as Soviet cosmonaut Pavel Fetisov. He is next set to star in Frankie Shaw's upcoming dark comedy film 4 Kids Walk Into a Bank, an adaptation of Matthew Rosenberg and Tyler Boss' graphic novel of the same name.

== Personal life ==
Strike's role in EastEnders led to questions about his sexuality early in his career, which he addressed in 2014, saying: "I'm not gay, just to set the record straight." He supported the charity event Sport Relief 2014 by competing in a swimming battle with his castmate Jamie Borthwick, which was broadcast live as part of the BBC programme The Sport Relief Games Show. Strike and other EastEnders actors also posed for a 2015 calendar in aid of the BBC charity Children in Need. Following his departure from the series, he has maintained a close friendship with his co-stars Danny Dyer, Kellie Bright and Maddy Hill who portrayed his father, mother and sister, respectively.

== Filmography ==
Key
†	Denotes films that have not yet been released

=== Film ===
Year	Title	Role	Ref.
2017	Bonded by Blood 2	Dean Boshell	
2017	Leatherface	Jedidiah Sawyer / Jackson / Leatherface	
2018	Monster Party	Casper	
2019	The Wisdom Tooth	Dash Greene	
2023	American Outlaws	Ryan Dougherty	
2023	The Boys in the Boat	Roger Morris	
2025	Westhampton	Jay	
TBA	4 Kids Walk Into a Bank †	Matches	
TBA	Turnbuckle †	Critter	

=== Television ===
Year	Title	Role	Notes	Ref.
2013–2014	M.I. High	Daniel "Dan" Morgan / Billy	Main role; series 6–7	
2013–2014	EastEnders	Johnny Carter	Series regular	
2014	Give Out Girls	Luke	Episode: "The Hot Boy"	
2015	The Dog Ate My Homework	Himself / Panellist	Series 2, episode 7	
2016	Silent Witness	David Hamilton	Episodes: "After the Fall: Part 1/Part 2"	
2016	Timeless	Clyde Barrow	Episode: "Last Ride of Bonnie & Clyde"	
2017	Mindhunter	Montie Rissell	Series 1, episode 4	
2018	Nightflyers	Thale	Main role	
2019	Chernobyl	Misha	Episode: "1:23:45"	
2020	FBI: Most Wanted	Ronnie Lee Bishop	Episode: "Predators"	
2020	When the Streetlights Go On	Casper Tatum	Main role	
2022	The Sandman	Todd	Episode: "A Hope in Hell"	
2024	Outer Range	Deputy Jess Chinlund	Recurring role; 5 episodes	
2026	Star City	Pavel Fetisov	Recurring role; 4 episodes	

=== Web ===
Year	Title	Role	Notes	Ref.
2014	On Set with... Sam Strike	Himself	Web miniseries; 1 episode	

== Awards and nominations ==
Ceremony	Year	Category	Work	Result	Ref.
TV Choice Awards	2014	Best Soap Newcomer	EastEnders	Nominated	
Inside Soap Awards	2014	Best Newcomer	EastEnders	Nominated	
Boston Film Festival	2023	Best Ensemble Cast	American Outlaws	Won	
