= Monster Party (film) =

2018 horror film

- Poster
- Directed by: Chris von Hoffmann
- Written by: Chris von Hoffmann
- Produced by: Brian Kavanaugh-Jones; Fred Berger; Eric B. Fleischman; Jesse Berger
- Starring: Sam Strike; Erin Moriarty; Kian Lawley; Robin Tunney; Virginia Gardner; Brandon Micheal Hall; Bill Engvall; Julian McMahon; Lance Reddick
- Cinematography: Tobias Deml
- Edited by: Gehrig Burnett Jr; Joe Rosenbloom
- Music by: Felix Erskine; Nao Sato
- Production company: RLJ Entertainment
- Distributed by: AMC Networks
- Release date: November 2, 2018
- Running time: 89 minutes

Monster Party is a 2018 horror thriller film written and directed by Chris von Hoffmann. The film stars Sam Strike, Erin Moriarty, Kian Lawley, Robin Tunney, Virginia Gardner, Brandon Micheal Hall, Bill Engvall, Julian McMahon, and Lance Reddick.

== Plot ==
Casper, Iris and her boyfriend Dodge, are three friends who perform highly coordinated burglaries in Malibu. After pulling off a successful burglary in broad daylight, Iris tells the other two that she has info on another possible job at a ritzy mansion near the coast. Due to the undoubtedly high security for the house, they decide against it.

Later, Casper discovers that his father, Flash, has been kidnapped by Emory, a local loan shark whom Casper's father is indebted to. Casper goes to Emory's strip club and attempts to negotiate his father's release, but Emory declines. He tells Casper that if he does not get him what Casper's father owes him, he will kill him. Knowing that his father will die if he tries to notify the police, Casper decides to go in on Iris's mansion job.

Under the guise of caterers, the three meet with the mansion's owners, the Dawson family; father Patrick, mother Roxanne, son Elliot, and daughter Alexis. The family gives off suspicious vibes, especially Roxanne, who is eager to assure that this night is perfect. Casper scouts the home and locates a safe and forms a plan with Iris and Dodge that involves short-circuiting the safe while attempting to crack it. As night approaches, the Dawson's guests arrive. These guests consist of musician Ollie, "blood brothers" Cameron and Jeremy, group leader Milo and his date Becca. During dinner, each person begins introducing and labelling themselves as "addicts" who are gathering to celebrate being "sober". While this is occurring, Casper is attempting to unlock the safe with Dodge on guard, and Iris in the kitchen monitoring the guests. Dodge is surprised by Elliot, who becomes increasingly hostile towards Dodge and insults Iris. When Dodge attempts to push Elliot away, Elliot pulls out a meat cleaver and severs Dodge's hand before savagely butchering him to death.

The house's security system then deactivates, alerting the guests who stumble upon a bloodied and tired Elliot. Iris rushes in and sees Dodge's corpse and screams, with the guests attempting to attack her and Casper. During the struggle, Iris kicks Ollie down the stairs, killing him, and the guests are held back by Milo's command to behave themselves. Iris breaks free and discovers that Becca committed suicide before rushing into a closet downstairs, while Casper hides in a bedroom and arms himself with a revolver he found. Attempting to deescalate the situation, Milo tells Casper that the group he leads consists of recovering serial killers who try to subdue their urge to kill through his leadership. He does not wish to kill Casper and Iris, and offers to buy them off with the intention really being to drug the two and have them arrested, thereby keeping suspicion away from the group.

Downstairs, Alexis secretly tells Iris that she intends to help them escape, but they are found by Cameron and Jeremy, who attack them. Casper holds the rest of the group at gunpoint and forces them downstairs, where they witness Jeremy attempting to strangle Iris, with Elliot disarming Casper. Enraged, Milo beats Jeremy to death, but is shot by Patrick, who intends to kill Iris and Casper, much to the dismay of Roxanne. Alexis manages to hide Iris and Casper in a secret room, which contains photos of the group's members and a sealed off chamber. Seeing his daughter's betrayal over the security cameras, Patrick uses the home's intercom system to play a music box tune which awakens Mickey, the Dawson's "dog," who is in the sealed chamber. Mikey bursts out of his chamber and attacks Iris and Casper. He kills Iris by biting off her face, but he himself is finally killed by a katana-wielding Casper.

Patrick resets the security system, opening the shutters. Seeing their chance to escape, Alexis and Casper flee the room, but are confronted by Patrick. He attempts to kill Casper, but is disemboweled. The two flee outside and are again confronted by Cameron, wielding a chainsaw. Casper severs Cameron's foot and the chainsaw falls on Cameron, eviscerating and killing him. The two are then knocked out by Elliot, who ties them to chairs suspended over the Dawson's pool. Elliot orders Casper and Alexis to cut ropes that will drop the other person's chair into the pool. Alexis cuts Casper's rope, but she is knocked into the pool by Elliot. Watching them, Elliot is surprised by Roxanne, who stabs him and rescues Casper and Alexis. A still-alive Elliot emerges from the pool, but is finally killed by Alexis.

Not wanting to cause anymore harm, Roxanne gives Casper $100,000 and one of their sports cars, who takes off while Roxanne and Alexis clean up their house. Casper drives straight to Emory's club and slaughters the security guarding it. Casper confronts Emory and slices the top of his head off, killing him, all in view of his father. Casper looks at his shocked father and drops the katana.

== Cast ==
- Sam Strike as Casper
- Erin Moriarty as Alexis Dawson
- Kian Lawley as Elliot Dawson
- Julian McMahon as Patrick Dawson
- Lance Reddick as Milo
- Virginia Gardner as Iris
- Brandon Micheal Hall as Dodge
- Robin Tunney as Roxanne Dawson
- Chester Rushing as Cameron
- Jamie Ward as Jeremy
- Diego Boneta as Ollie
- Sofia Castro as Becca
- Bill Engvall as Flash
- Mickey Gooch Jr as Emory
- Howard Charles as Luther
- Logan Huffman as Mickey
- Michael Reilly Burke as Mr. Clapton
- Christine Kent as Mrs. Clapton
- Johanna Haneda as Older Lady
- Sara Hailey Balint as Patriotic Dancer
- Eden Levine as Strip Club Employee
- Victoria De Mare as Dancer 1
- Georgina Leahy as Dancer 2

== Release ==
Monster Party was released in theatres on November 2, 2018. The film was released on Blu-ray on December 18, 2018, by RLJ Entertainment.

== Reception ==
Review aggregator Rotten Tomatoes gives the film a rating of 76%, based on 21 reviews, with an average rating of 6.3/10. Review aggregator Metacritic gives the film a score of 58 out of 100, based on 4 critics, indicating "mixed or average reviews".

Frank Scheck, of The Hollywood Reporter, wrote in his review: "If you believe what goes on in movies, thieves really have to become more discerning about their potential targets." Noel Murray, of the Los Angeles Times, wrote in his review: "The darkly comic, blood-soaked thriller 'Monster Party' is a throwback to the post-Tarantino ’90s, when violent characters were treated like cartoons and any picture with fewer than a dozen corpses was practically for children. The movie is pretty lightweight — disemboweling aside — but has a fair amount of punch, and it could appeal to connoisseurs of self-conscious pulp." Randy Cordova, of The Arizona Republic, wrote in his review: "'Monster Party' is a twisted, grisly little shocker that isn’t afraid to grab you by the guts — or to show you a man’s guts cascading to the floor. It’s that kind of movie. It’s also pretty effective and rather fun, if you have the stomach for this sort of thing."

== See also ==
- 2018 in film
