= The Chosen (2015 film) =

- Theatrical release poster
- Directed by: Ben Jehoshua
- Screenplay by: Barry Jay Stitch; Andrew Scheppmann; Ben Jehoshua
- Produced by: Joe Dain; Miles Fineburg; Jim Klock
- Starring: Kian Lawley; Elizabeth Keener; Angela Chitwood; Chris Gann; Dayna Devon
- Cinematography: David Desio
- Edited by: Toby Devine
- Music by: Evan Monheit
- Production company: Terror Films
- Distributed by: Terror Films; Supergravity Pictures
- Release date: July 24, 2015
- Running time: 88 minutes
- Country: United States
- Language: English

See The Chosen (disambiguation) for other than the 2015 movie

The Chosen is a 2015 American horror film starring YouTube personality Kian Lawley and Elizabeth Keener. The screenplay was written by Barry Jay Stitch, Andrew Scheppmann, and Ben Jehoshua, who also directed. The film was produced by Joe Dain, Miles Fineburg, and Jim Klock. It was released on July 24, 2015.

The Chosen is Lawley's first feature film starring role.

== Plot ==
When a child-stealing demon attaches itself to a little girl, her family is thrust into a battle against time in order to save the girl and send the demon back to hell.

Cameron helps his mother with the care of his Grandma, Grandpa and niece after his sister is kicked out of the house. Her drug addiction was a contributing factor in the death of Angie's (Cameron's niece) twin brother, Jamie.

Against his mother's wishes Cameron takes his niece to see her recovering mother. The three have a nice afternoon until fighting starts next door apartment. After hearing things smash and screams coming from next door, Cameron bursts in. He 'saves' a man from being killed by his ex-wife but the baby, who had been crying through the violence, has disappeared. The lady hates Cameron for interrupting what she calls a ritual. It isn't until Angie falls 'ill' when Cameron returns she reveals that she was trying to save her son from being taken.

She explains that Lilith, the first wife of Adam and child snatching demon, was after her child. That he was chosen and the only way to save him was to sacrifice six family members in six days.

Cameron discovers that Angie is 'chosen' and embarks on a hard journey to discover which family members he should sacrifice.

== Cast ==
- Kian Lawley as Cameron
- Elizabeth Keener as Eliza
- Angelica Chitwood as Caitlin
- Chris Gann as Uncle Joey
- Dayna Devon as Aunt Judy
- Wiley B. Oscar as Officer Kevin
- Mykayla Sohn as Angie
- Casey James Knight as Brian
- Emily Killian as Megan
- Barbara Goodson as Godmother

== Release ==
The film was released on Vimeo on demand, iTunes, Netflix, and Google Play.

== Reception ==
Matt Boiselle of Dread Central rated it 2/5 stars and wrote that Lawley was "not that bad" but "needs a little bit more of a structurally sound vehicle to showcase his potential". A review from Culture Crypt criticized the film's plot, writing that it was "so bafflingly daft that suspending disbelief for a single second is impossible".
