= Connor Franta =

American YouTuber (born 1992)

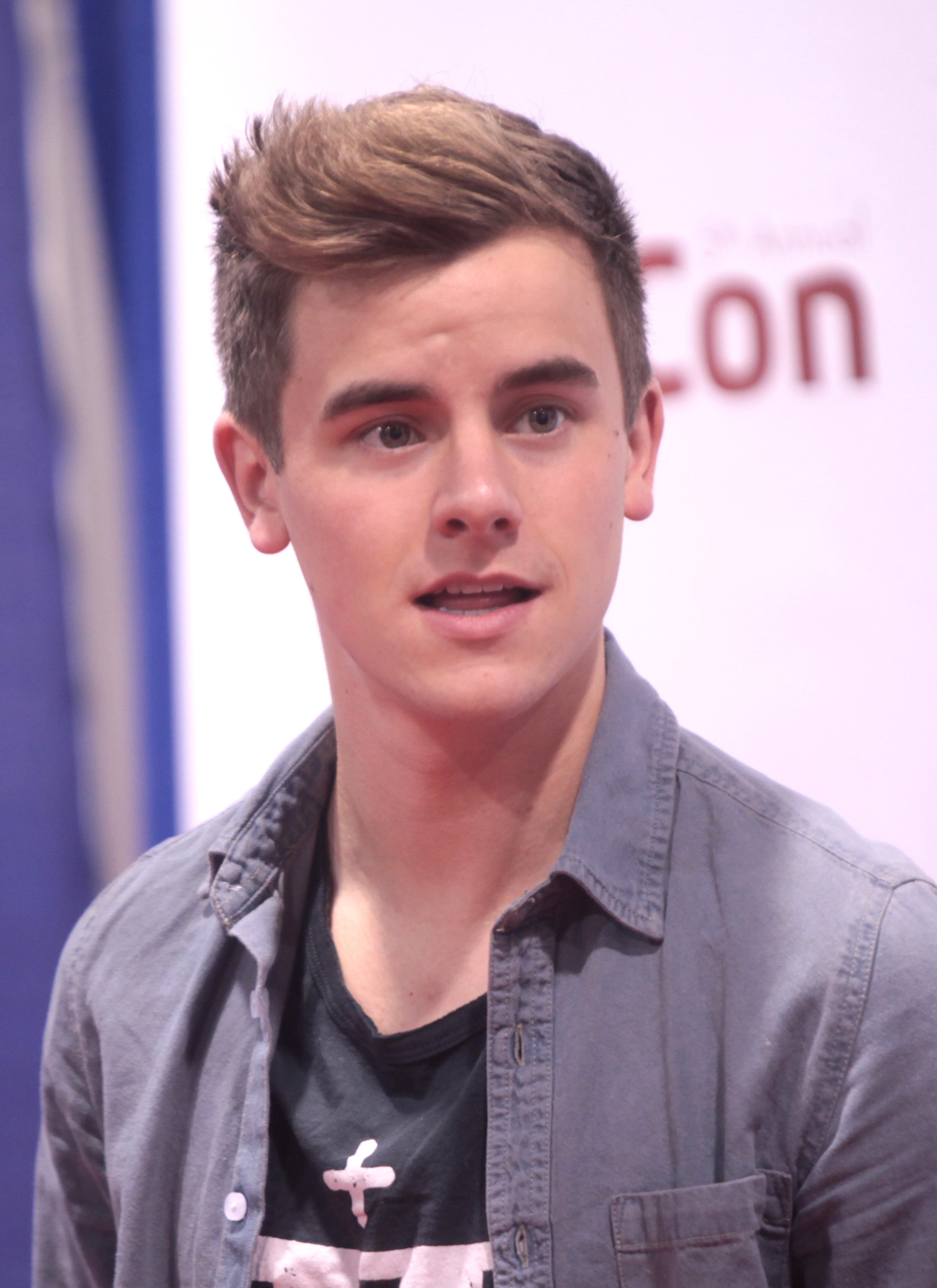
- Franta in 2014
- Born: Connor Joel Franta; September 12, 1992 (age 34); Wisconsin, U.S.
- Occupations: Vlogger; writer; entrepreneur; photographer

YouTube information
- Channel: ConnorFranta
- Years active: 2010–present
- Subscribers: 4.74 million
- Views: 421 million
- Last updated: April 8, 2026

Connor Joel Franta (born September 12, 1992) is an American YouTuber, author, artist, and entrepreneur.

At its peak in January 2017, his eponymous main channel on YouTube had over 5.67 million subscribers. Franta was a member of the YouTube group Our Second Life (stylized Our2ndLife and abbreviated as O2L) from 2012 to 2014.

Franta has also become involved in various entrepreneurial enterprises, including a clothing line, music curation, and a coffee and lifestyle brand. He has published several books: A Work in Progress (2015), Note to Self (2017), and House Fires (2021). In July 2015, Franta co-founded the record label Heard Well.

== Early life and education ==
Connor Joel Franta was born in Wisconsin, the third of four children born to Peter and Cheryl Franta, a physician and homemaker, respectively. He was raised Catholic in La Crescent, Minnesota.

Franta attended elementary school at St. Peter's Catholic School in Hokah, Minnesota, through 8th grade. As a child, he was overweight, leading his mother to sign him up for a YMCA swimming team. He ran cross country while attending La Crescent High School, where he graduated in 2011. He studied business at the College of Saint Benedict and Saint John's University in Collegeville, Minnesota. In his second year, he added an arts minor, with an emphasis on films. He subsequently dropped out of college and moved to Los Angeles in 2013 to pursue his YouTube career.

== Career ==
=== YouTube ===
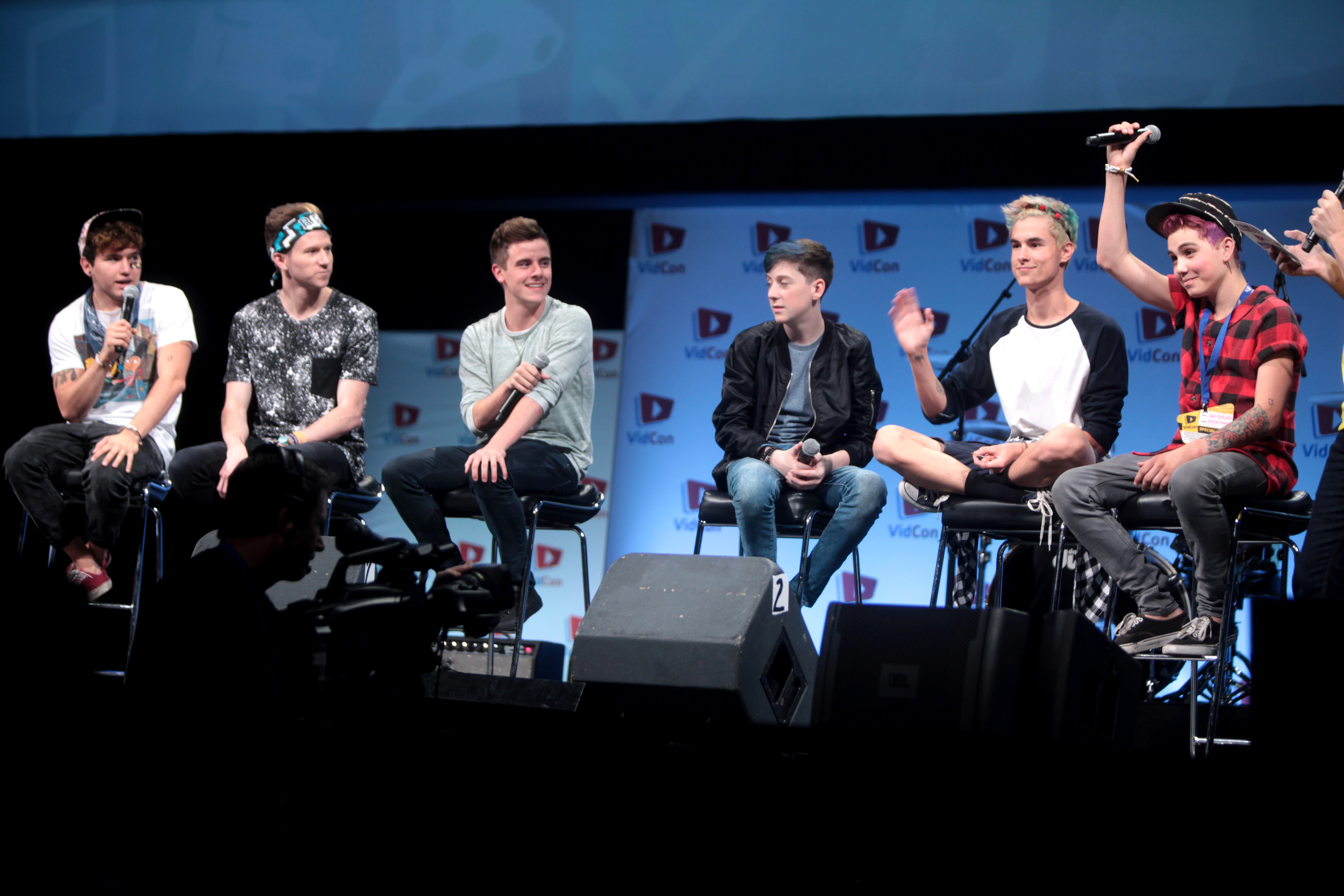
Franta (third from left) with other members of Our2ndLife at VidCon 2014

Inspired by other YouTube vloggers such as Mitchell Davis, Franta uploaded his first video to YouTube in August 2010. As of September 2022, he has more than 400 million views on his channel and over 4.9 million subscribers.

In 2012, he joined a collaboration channel known as "Our2ndLife" (or O2L for short) along with 5 other YouTube personalities (Kian Lawley, Trevi Moran, JC Caylen, Ricky Dillon, and Sam Pottorff), which helped him gain popularity. He announced his departure from the group in July 2014 due to personal issues.

He has made cameo appearances in the 2014 and 2015 YouTube Rewind videos, a tribute by YouTube to the year's most popular videos on the website. In January 2016, Franta won the "Favorite YouTube Star" award at the 42nd People's Choice Awards. In October, Franta appeared at the We Day conference in Toronto, Canada.

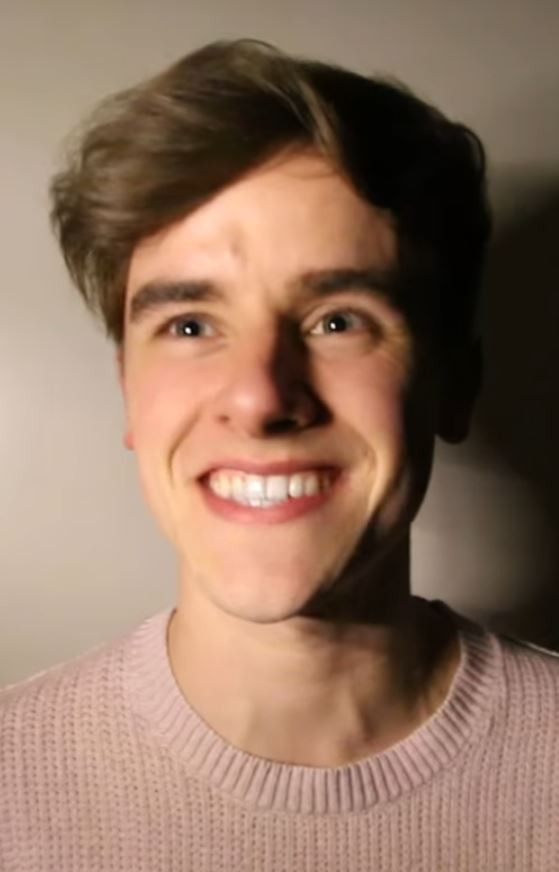
Franta appearing in a Vlogbrothers video in 2016

=== Other projects ===
==== The Thirst Project ====
Franta celebrated his 22nd birthday in 2014 by launching a fundraising campaign for The Thirst Project to build water wells for people in Swaziland. He set a goal of raising $120,000 within a month by offering fans incentives such as T-shirts, posters, an acknowledgement in one of his videos, and a Skype call with him. Within 48 hours, fans raised over US$75,000 and met the original $120,000 goal in 10 days. By the end of the month, the campaign raised over $230,000. He later visited Swaziland to see the wells the donations helped build. Franta received the Governor's Award for his work at the Thirst Project's 6th Annual Thirst Gala on June 30, 2015.

Franta launched a second campaign for his 23rd birthday with the goal of raising $180,000 in 30 days. When the campaign closed in October 2015, he had raised more than $191,000, which contributed to the building of 16 water wells in Swaziland.

==== Entrepreneurship ====
On November 11, 2014, Franta released a compilation album, Crown, Vol. 1, of songs from his choice of up-and-coming musicians. The album charted on the Billboard 200. A second compilation was released under Franta's Common Culture brand on March 3, 2015, followed by a third compilation on July 24, 2015, a fourth on December 25, 2015, and a fifth on April 28, 2016.

In July 2015, it was announced that Franta had started a record label, Heard Well, in partnership with his manager Andrew Graham and Jeremy Wineberg of music distribution and licensing company Opus Label (through which Franta's first two compilations were released). Variety described Heard Well as "a music label focused on producing compilation albums featuring undiscovered artists as curated by digital 'influencers.'" Amanda Steele, Anthony Quintal (Lohanthony), and Jc Caylen are the first digital stars signed to put together compilations.

In February 2015, Franta released his own line of coffee, called Common Culture Coffee. The coffee was produced in collaboration with LA Coffee Club and $1 from each bag of coffee sold was donated to The Thirst Project.

In June 2015, Franta released a small limited edition line of clothing, made in collaboration with Junk Food Clothing. In January 2016, Franta launched his new website for Common Culture.

==== Writing ====
Franta spent over a year writing his memoir, A Work in Progress, which talks about moments from his life since birth and personal stories. It was released on April 21, 2015. Accompanying the release of the book, Franta had a book tour in the United States with appearances in Minnesota, Houston, Orlando, New York City, New Jersey, and Los Angeles, London, Birmingham, Manchester, Liverpool and Leeds in the United Kingdom, and Sydney, Melbourne, Brisbane and Perth in Australia. The book spent 16 weeks on The New York Times Best Seller list and sold over 200,000 copies.

In January 2017, Franta announced he would be releasing his second book, Note to Self, on April 18, 2017. The book features essays, stories, poetry, and photography by Franta about issues including clinical depression, social anxiety, breakups, and self-love. Franta said "If my first book, A Work in Progress, was a reflection of my external life so far, then this follow-up is a reflection of my internal life."

In June 2021, Franta announced his third memoir, House Fires, was set to be released on September 21, 2021.

==== Photography ====
Franta's photography has been published in V, L'Officiel, and Paper. He has photographed many celebrities including Jonathan Van Ness, Billie Eilish, Doja Cat, Olivia Rodrigo, Hailee Steinfeld, Maude Apatow, Chloe x Halle, Conan Gray, Tinashe, and HAIM.

== Personal life ==
On December 8, 2014, Franta publicly came out as gay in a YouTube video, stating he has accepted who he is and is "happy with that person". He also spoke on the help he got from others on the internet, and wanted to give people struggling with their sexuality similar advice. His six-minute video, titled "Coming Out", has garnered over 12 million views and more than 970,000 likes, making it the second-most-watched video on Franta's channel as of 2025.

In a 2024 appearance on the podcast Obsessed with Brooke Averick, Franta discussed meeting Chappell Roan before her rise to fame. During the conversation, he seemingly confirmed that he had been in a romantic relationship with singer and fellow YouTuber Troye Sivan in 2014. In August 2025, Franta acknowledged in a YouTube video that the two had been in a two-year relationship from 2014 to 2016.

Franta currently resides in West Hollywood, California.

== Bibliography ==
- A Work in Progress (2015)
- Note to Self (2017)
- House Fires (2021)

== Awards and nominations ==
Year	Award	Category	Result	Ref.
2014	Teen Choice Awards	Web Star: Male	Nominated	
2015	Teen Choice Awards	Entertainer of the Year	Nominated	
2015	Teen Choice Awards	Choice YouTuber	Nominated	
2015	Streamy Awards	Audience Choice Entertainer of the Year	Nominated	
2016	People's Choice Awards	Favorite YouTube Star	Won	
