= American Outlaws (2023 film) =

- Theatrical release poster
- Directed by: Sean McEwen
- Written by: Sean McEwen
- Based on: "The Whole True Story of the Dougherty Gang" by Kathy Dobie
- Produced by: Sean McEwen; Cassidy Lunnen; Alexandre Dauman; John Papsidera
- Starring: India Eisley; Emory Cohen; Sam Strike; Cory Hardrict; Treat Williams
- Cinematography: Justin Henning
- Edited by: Jason Dopko; Andrew Dickler
- Music by: Michael Lira
- Production companies: Narrator Entertainment; Big Cat Productions; Charlie Baby Productions
- Distributed by: Vertical Entertainment
- Release dates: February 17, 2023 (SBIFF); September 15, 2023 (United States)
- Running time: 99 minutes
- Country: United States
- Language: English
- Budget: $2.1 million

American Outlaws is a 2023 American mystery crime drama film written and directed by Sean McEwen and starring India Eisley, Emory Cohen and Sam Strike. This was Treat Williams' final film appearance before his death. It is based on the GQ article "The Whole True Story of the Dougherty Gang" by Kathy Dobie, about criminal siblings Dylan, Lee-Grace and Ryan Dougherty.

== Plot ==
Three siblings, facing the possibility of prison, take matters into their own hands with a cross-country crime spree of epic proportions.

== Cast ==
- Emory Cohen as Dylan Dougherty
- India Eisley as Lee-Grace Dougherty
- Sam Strike as Ryan Dougherty
- Tess Harper as Loretta Hillhouse
- Cory Hardrict as Agent Morely
- Treat Williams as Agent Jameison R. Donovan
- Lance E. Nichols as Willy Spencer
- Michael Myles Hayes as Chase Little

== Production ==
In October 2018, it was announced that Cohen, Eisley, Strike, Harper, Hardrict and Williams were cast in the film, then titled The Dougherty Gang. In December that same year, it was announced that Nichols was cast in the film and filming occurred in Plain Dealing, Louisiana.

== Release ==
The film premiered at the Santa Barbara International Film Festival on February 17, 2023.

== Reception ==
Alan Ng of Film Threat rated the film an 8.5 out of 10.

Donald Liebenson of RogerEbert.com praised the performances of Williams and Hardrict, writing that they "etch an entertaining mentor-mentee dynamic."

== Awards ==
The film won five awards at the Boston Film Festival, including:

- Best Film
- Best Screenplay
- Best Director
- Best Actress: India Eisley
- Best Ensemble Cast: India Eisley, Sam Strike, Emory Cohen, Cory Hardrict, Treat Williams, Tess Harper

Williams was also recognized with a posthumous Lifetime Achievement Award, accepted by his son Gil.

== See also ==
- List of hood films
