= Lohanthony =

American YouTuber

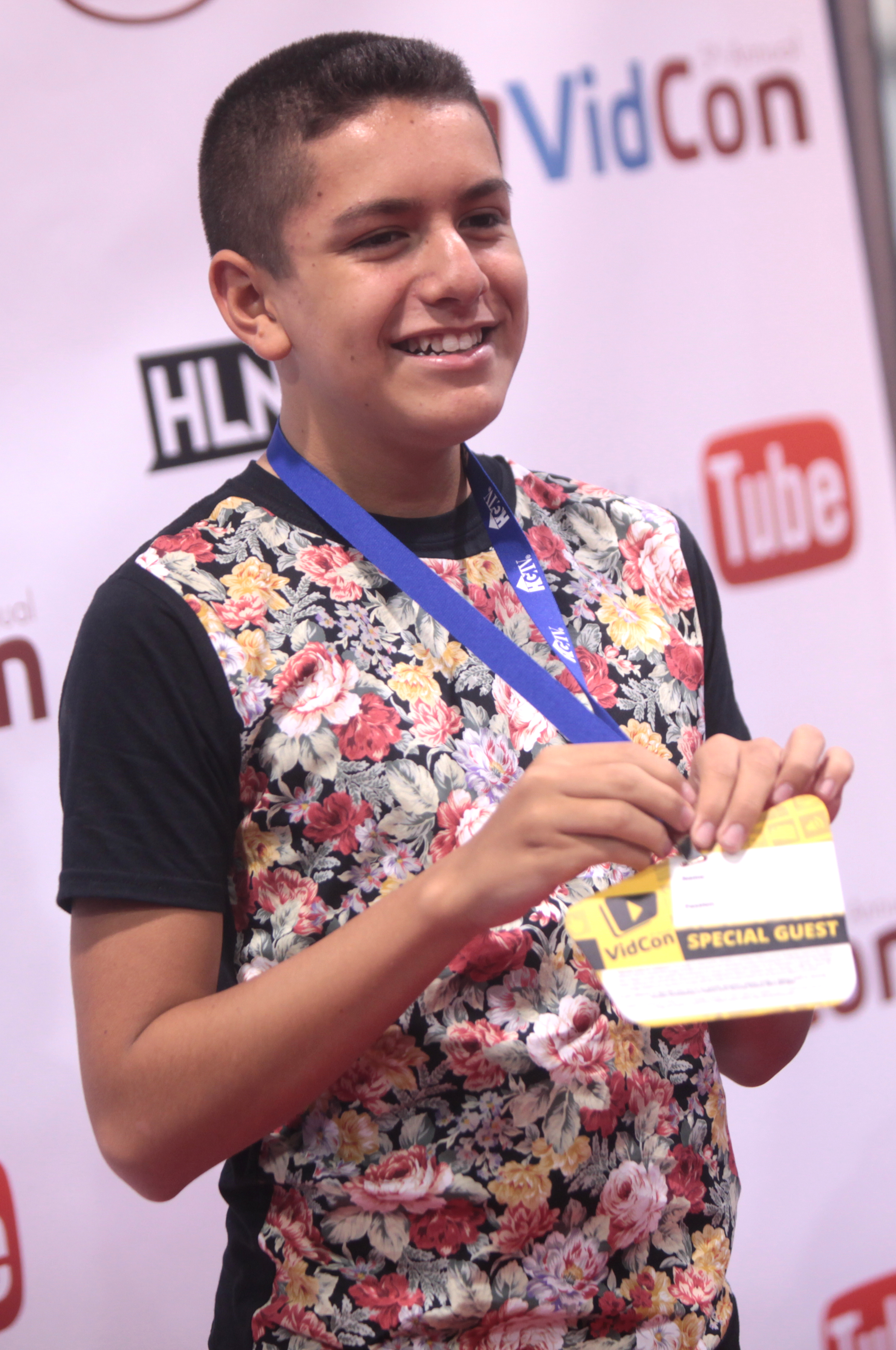
- Quintal at VidCon in 2014
- Born: Anthony Michael Quintal; May 24, 1999 (age 27); Melrose, Massachusetts, U.S.
- Occupations: YouTuber; social media star

YouTube information
- Channel: Lohanthony
- Years active: 2012–2020
- Genres: Vlog; comedy
- Subscribers: 1.18 million
- Views: 96.7 thousand
- Last updated: June 16, 2026

Anthony Michael Quintal (born May 24, 1999), better known as Lohanthony, is an American former YouTuber and social media star. He started making YouTube videos at age 10 and found success after his video "Calling All the Basic Bitches" went viral in 2012. By 2015, he reached one and a half million subscribers on YouTube, where he became popular for his sassy demeanor and for being openly queer.

Outside of YouTube, he had a number of other ventures. He starred in the 2016 film Miss Stevens as Sam and hosted the MTV series Teen Wolf After, After Show (2014) and the AwesomenessTV web series Lohanthony & Rickey's Guide to Dating (2016). His compilation album on Heard Well, Landscapes: A Music Compilation by Lohanthony, debuted in the top five of the Billboard Dance/Electronic Albums chart. He was nominated for two Teen Choice Awards over the course of his career.

== Life and career ==
Anthony Michael Quintal was born on May 24, 1999, in Melrose, Massachusetts. Quintal started making YouTube videos at age 10 using his parents' computer, which he originally edited with iMovie and later with Final Cut Pro. His username, Lohanthony, is a portmanteau of the last name of actress Lindsay Lohan and his first name. His videos were filmed on his laptop camera from his bedroom floor, where he addressed topics like pop culture, his life, and his liberal politics from a "sassy, swear-y, proudly gay" perspective. His video "Calling All the Basic Bitches", which showed him swinging his leg around and repeating the phrase, "Calling all the basic bitches," went viral in 2012 and popularized the terms "basic" and "basic bitch" while garnering almost three million views by 2015. The video was recreated in 2015 by model Kate Moss and designer Marc Jacobs. Quintal also posted a video in which he came out as gay.

Quintal was nominated for two awards — Choice Web Star: Comedy and Choice Web Collaboration — at the 2014 Teen Choice Awards. Also in 2014, Quintal co-hosted the Teen Wolf After, After Show, an MTV companion series to their teen drama television series Teen Wolf, with Morgan Evans. By 2014, he had one million subscribers on YouTube, and had one and a half million subscribers by the following year. He signed to WME in February 2015 and was featured in Delta Air Lines' meme-themed safety video in May 2015. He released Landscapes: A Music Compilation by Lohanthony, a compilation album of other artists' music, in September 2015 on the Heard Well label. The album debuted at number three on Billboard's Dance/Electronic Albums after selling over one thousand copies in its first week. In 2016, he starred in the AwesomenessTV web series Lohanthony & Rickey's Guide to Dating, where he and fellow social media star Rickey Thompson looked for boyfriends. That same year, he also starred in the comedy-drama film Miss Stevens as Sam, an insecure teenager. He was also popular on the video-sharing service Vine before its shutdown in 2016, and was nominated as Best Viner for Tiger Beat's 19 Under 19 program that year.

In 2020, Quintal removed most of his past videos and posted a 41-minute-long video titled "Jesus Delivers – Surviving Sexuality" in which he renounced his earlier videos and homosexuality, stating that he had been "trying to find God's love" by pursuing homosexual relationships, which he described as "sexual immorality". He compared them to his being addicted to alcohol, marijuana, and attention at the time, and said that he would be opting for a life of "Christian celibacy" instead. The video received largely negative reactions from fans and fellow YouTube stars such as Tyler Oakley, who speculated that he had been a victim of conversion therapy. He denied attending conversion therapy in a subsequent video titled "Conversion Therapy and God's Truth", stating that he was "abandoning consuming lusts, both homosexual and heterosexual alike".

== Public image ==
Quintal has called Shane Dawson an inspiration for his YouTube channel, and named RuPaul and Beyoncé as role models of his outside of YouTube. Rich Juzwiak of New York called Quintal "the littlest big diva" and "a savant of camp" in 2014. Insider's Kat Tenbarge wrote that Quintal was "a role model for gay children and teens around the world" as a teenager. In late 2015, he became vegan.
