= Kian Lawley =

American YouTuber and actor (born 1995)

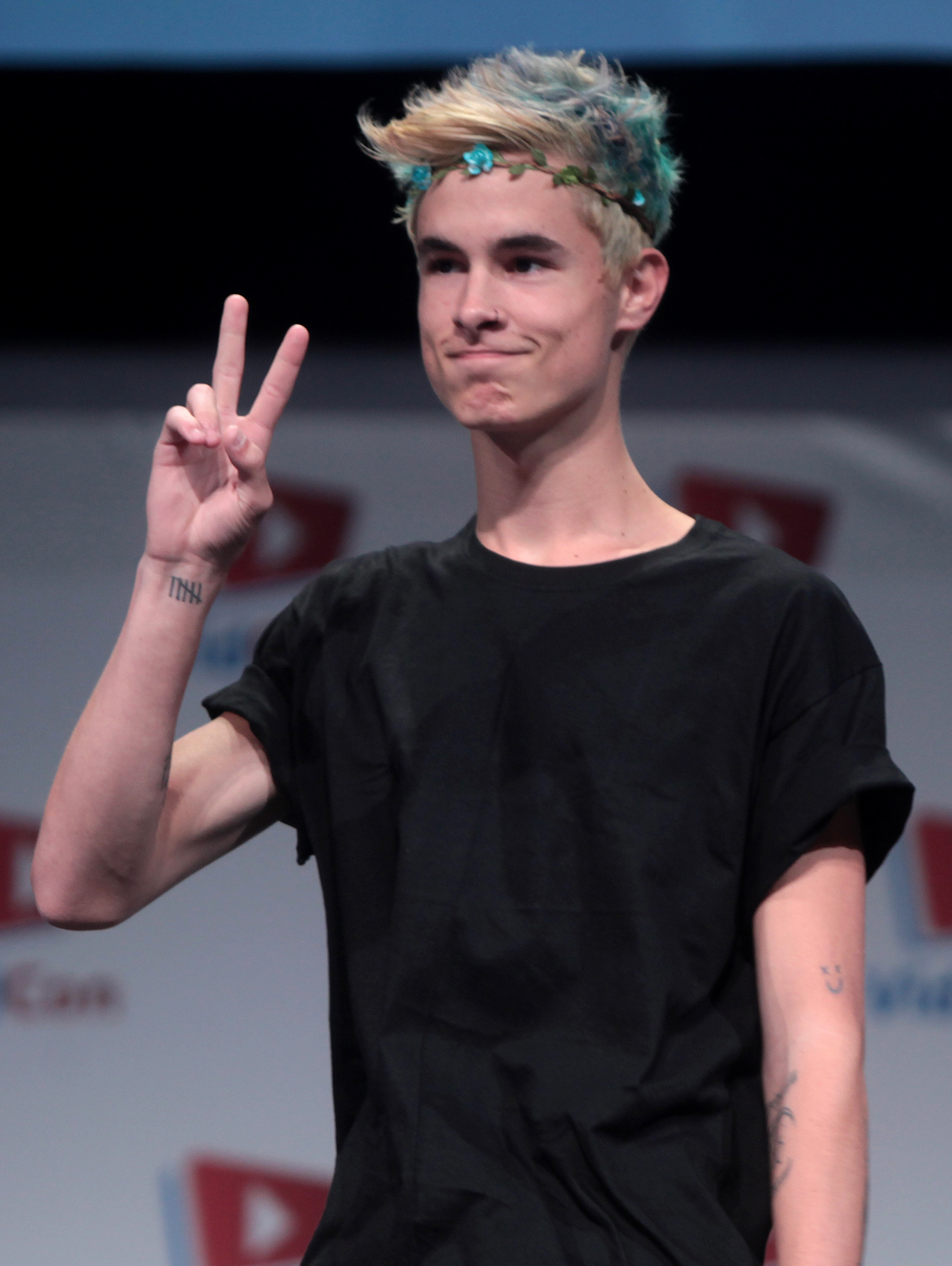
- Lawley in 2014
- Born: Kian Robert Lawley; September 2, 1995 (age 31); Sioux City, Iowa, U.S.
- Occupations: YouTube personality, actor, streamer
- Partner: Ayla Woodruff (2019–present)
- Children: 2

YouTube information
- Channels: superkian13; KianLawleyVODS; KianAndJc
- Years active: 2010–present
- Subscribers: 3.22 million (superkian13); 101 thousand (KianLawleyVODS); 3.82 million (KianAndJc)
- Views: 70.5 million (superkian13); 11.6 million (KianLawleyVODS); 847 million (KianAndJc)
- Last updated: June 2023

Kian Robert Lawley (born September 2, 1995) is an American YouTuber, influencer and actor. Lawley launched his YouTube channel, superkian13, in 2010. He has also been a part of collaborative YouTube channels, including Our2ndLife. Lawley shares the YouTube channel "KianAndJc" with fellow YouTuber JC Caylen.

Lawley's first role in a feature film was in the 2015 film The Chosen. Lawley went on to feature in the films Shovel Buddies (2016), Boo! A Madea Halloween (2016), Boo 2! A Madea Halloween (2017), Before I Fall (2017) for which he won a Teen Choice Award, and Monster Party (2018). In 2017, Lawley worked with Caylen on their show H8TERS and starred in the Daytime Emmy Award winning first season of "Zac & Mia". In 2018, footage of Lawley resurfaced in which he used racial slurs, leading to his role in The Hate U Give being recast, and to him being dropped by his talent agency, CAA.

== Early life ==
Kian Lawley was born on September 2, 1995, in Sioux City, Iowa. He has Polish, Irish and German heritage. At a young age, his family moved to San Clemente, California.

== Career ==
=== 2010–2015: Early YouTube career ===
Lawley launched his first channel in 2010, under the name Superkian13. Lawley also had a collaborative channel with Sam Pottorff in 2011, named KianSam13. In 2012, Lawley started a collaborative channel Our2ndLife (commonly known as O2L) along with JC Caylen, Ricky Dillon, Trevi Moran, Connor Franta, and Sam Pottorff. The channel grew to over 2.8 million subscribers, and in 2014 the group headlined a 19-city tour, but they later separated, in December 2014. Lawley and Caylen launched their collaborative channel KianAndJc in January 2015. At the 2015 Teen Choice Awards, Lawley won the award for Choice YouTuber.

=== 2015–2018: Acting career ===
Lawley's first starring role was in the 2015 film The Chosen in which he played a 19 year old who must contend with a demon to save his niece. In 2016, he co-starred with Bella Thorne in the comedy Shovel Buddies. In March 2016, the film was selected and premiered at SXSW Festival. In an interview about the film Lawley said "I don't plan to ditch to YouTube, I plan to do both [acting and YouTube]". Lawley also played "Bean Boy" in the 2016 Tyler Perry comedy Boo! A Madea Halloween.

In 2017, Lawley and JC Caylen starred in and executive produced their show H8TERS, a comedy about internet celebrities, haters and millennial culture. That year, Lawley appeared alongside Zoey Deutch, Halston Sage, and Logan Miller in the film Before I Fall, for which he won the award for Choice Movie Actor: Drama at the 2017 Teen Choice Awards. In 2017 he also starred in the series Zac & Mia, a show that follows the lives of two ordinary teenagers undergoing cancer treatment. The show was nominated for six Daytime Emmy Awards and won two: Outstanding Lead Actress in a Digital Daytime Drama Series and Outstanding Writing in a Digital Drama Series. In 2017, AwesomenessTV renewed Zac & Mia for a second season. In 2018, Lawley received a nomination for the Best Actor In A Digital Drama Daytime Emmy Award for his performance in Zac & Mia.

On February 5, 2018, it was announced that Lawley had been fired from The Hate U Give due to a resurfaced video showing Lawley using racially offensive slurs. His scenes as Chris, the main character's boyfriend, were reshot with Riverdale star KJ Apa. Lawley released an apology on Twitter, stating, "I am deeply sorry to those that were effected [sic] by my choice of language. I respect Fox's decision to recast this role for The Hate U Give as it is an important story, and it would not be appropriate for me to be involved considering the actions of my past. I understand the impact and I have grown a lot and learned since then." He was subsequently dropped by his talent agency CAA.

=== 2019–present: The Reality House ===
Lawley and Caylen have taken a shift on their channel with more significant productions. In July 2019, they premiered their new Big Brother-style series The Reality House which features a group of YouTubers in a house competing to win $25,000. The series did extremely well, gaining over 25 million views collectively across all ten episodes and a second season began filming in November 2019. The second season premiered in January 2020 and included more elaborate challenges and an increased prize of $50,000. The second season was also a success online, with the first two seasons gaining nearly a million views per episode. A fourth season is pending.

== Personal life ==
Lawley began dating influencer and YouTuber Ayla Woodruff in 2019. On October 11, 2023, she gave birth to their first child, a son, named Coast Corey Woodruff-Lawley. On July 15, 2026, she gave birth to their second child, a son, named Oaklen Brian Woodruff-Lawley.

== Filmography ==
=== Film ===
Year	Title	Role
2015	The Chosen	Cameron
2016	Shovel Buddies	Dan
2016	Boo! A Madea Halloween	Bean Boy
2017	Before I Fall	Rob Cockran
2018	Monster Party	Elliot Dawson

=== Television ===
Year	Title	Role	Notes	Refs
2017	H8TERS	Himself / Frank	10 episodes	
2017	Apologies in Advance	Himself	Season 1 Finale	
2017	Guilty Party	Jake	8 episodes	
2017–2019	Zac & Mia	Zac Meier	Web series; main role	
2020–present	Perfect Commando	Vantaa "Van" Hamilton	Main role	

== Awards and nominations ==
Year	Nominated	Award	Result	Refs
2014	Teen Choice Awards	Choice Web Star: Comedy (as part of Our 2nd Life)	Won	
2015	Teen Choice Awards	Choice YouTuber	Won	
2016	Teen Choice Awards	Choice YouTuber	Nominated	
2016	Streamy Awards	Entertainer of the Year	Nominated	
2017	Teen Choice Awards	Choice Drama Movie Actor	Won	
2018	Daytime Emmys	Best Actor In A Digital Drama	Nominated	
2020	Shorty Awards	Best YouTube Ensemble (shared with Jc Caylen)	Won	
