= Zhang Dayi =

Chinese fashion entrepreneur

Zhang Dayi (张大奕) (born 25 October 1988) is a fashion entrepreneur/ designer who is a very successful internet celebrity on Sina Weibo and other sites in China. Her business is called Wuhuanxide Yichu (in English The Wardrobe I Like)

== Description ==
Zhang Dayi was born on 25 October 1988 and she was a fashion student in China who has risen to be an internet celebrity. She was a fashion model in 2009 and in May 2014 she established her own on-line shop, 吾歡喜的衣櫥 (Wuhuanxide Yichu), or "The Wardrobe I Like", in partnership with Feng Win. Feng Win had experience of establishing internet companies. The two chose Taobao as their prime site.

In Dec 2017, she established her second online shop, 口红卖掉了呢 (KouHongMaiDiaoLeNe), or "The lipsticks have been sold out!", which sells cosmetics products made by her company. The lipsticks sold out in only two hours of landing, with the sales volume of 20,000.

She chats on her site and she has seven million followers on the Chinese equivalent of Twitter which is called Sina Weibo. In one video she will wear ten or so outfits and then chat live during the one hour webcast. A single video may be viewed nine million times showing outfits that are designed for her to wear. It is estimated that she has thousands of pictures taken of her and then a few are chosen each day to reflect her image. Her factory soon employed 100 people.

The largest shopping channel in China reported 5000 sales within seconds of a post featuring her in new clothing. She was reported to be in the top ten internet celebrities in 2016.

Her annual income is reported as 300m yuan (£35m; $46m) in 2016. This was higher than the top Chinese actresses reported income.

== Positions ==
Zhang has remarked about hurdles that female entrepreneurs faces, stating for instance that "When a man accomplished something, all controversies disappear and every word of his turns into a rule of success. But when a woman succeeds in business, the rumors surrounding her only get worse."
