= Ricky Dillon =

American YouTuber

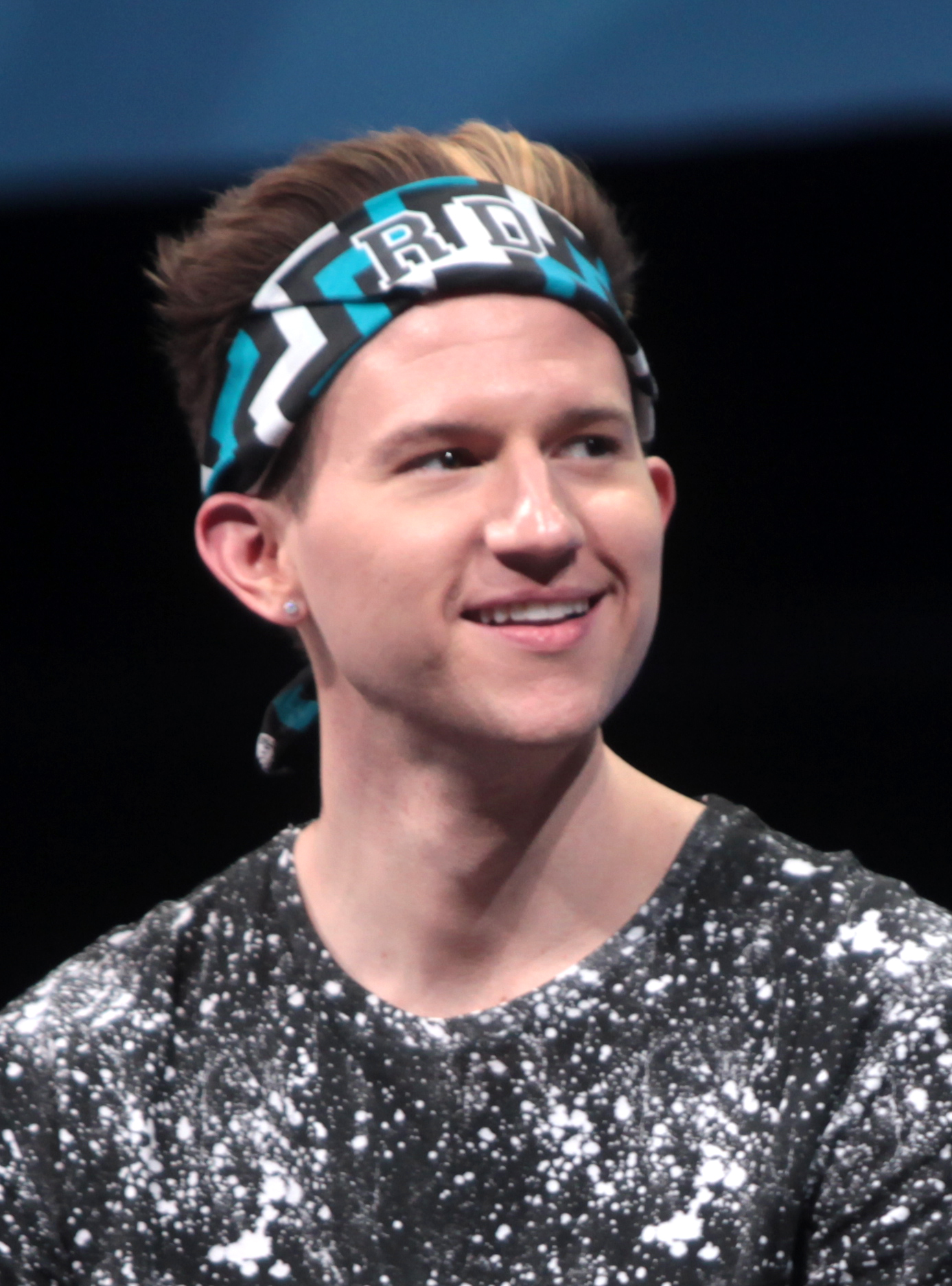
- Dillon at VidCon 2014
- Born: Richard Porter Dillon Jr. 4 April 1992 (age 34); Greenville, North Carolina, U.S.
- Occupations: YouTuber; comedian; singer

YouTube information
- Channels: rickydillon; rickydillonextra
- Years active: 2009–present
- Genres: Pop; pop rock; R&B
- Subscribers: 2.92 million
- Views: 383 million
- Last updated: August 8, 2025

Richard Porter Dillon Jr. (born 4 April 1992), nicknamed as Ricky Dillon, is an American YouTube personality and singer. Over his ten years on YouTube, Dillon has amassed over 2.9 million subscribers on his channel, as well as more than 383 million views on his videos.

== Early life and education ==
Dillon was born in North Carolina. His family moved to Tuscumbia, Alabama when he was one year old. He has two older sisters, named Tara and Lexi. Dillon attended high school at Hoover High School where he also marched in the band. Dillon then attended college at Auburn University to study film but dropped out after three years.

== Career ==
Dillon began his career on YouTube, uploading his first public video to his channel, PICKLEandBANANA, in 2009. Dillon also gained exposure due to the YouTube supergroup Our2ndLife where he, Connor Franta, JC Caylen, Kian Lawley, Trevi Moran and Sam Pottorff went on an international tour and amassed a total 2.7 million subscribers before the group broke up in December 2014. He is also partnered with Fullscreen and has participated in their InTour festival.

Dillon uploads original songs and covers, as well as music videos on his channel. He also starred in a scripted Sour Patch Kids series, titled Breaking Out.

In 2014, Dillon released his debut single, titled "Ordinary". Dillon's debut EP, titled RPD, was released on January 26, 2015. In July 2015, Dillon released his sophomore single titled "Beat". In an interview with People magazine at VidCon 2015, Dillon hinted towards a new personal song called "Gold", told to be featured as one of the tracks on his second EP.

Dillon has mentioned in multiple interviews that Demi Lovato is a major influence to his musical career. He has covered several of her songs on his YouTube channel some of which were released to iTunes.

On December 1, 2015, Dillon announced the release of his debut album Gold, which was released on January 15, 2016. The 10-track set (produced by Bobby J) is preceded by the lead single "Steal the Show" (featuring Trevi Moran) released on December 28. Snoop Dogg and fellow YouTube personalities Trevi Moran and Shelby Wadell are featured on the album. The music video for the second single "Problematic" (featuring Snoop Dogg) was released on January 15.

== Personal life ==
Dillon, who has previously dated both men and women, posted a video in September 2016 entitled "My Sexuality", in which he said that, "If I were to label myself, I would be the closest to asexual." In a February 2019 video named "My Coming Out Video Was a Lie", Dillon distanced himself from earlier comments on his asexuality, remarking on the 2016 video that "I no longer 100% relate to that video, I don't have a label for myself for the time being, I am figuring myself out, and I don't label myself as asexual". In February 2020, Dillon posted a video in which he came out as gay (titled "I'm Gay").

== Discography ==
=== Studio albums ===
List of studio albums, with selected chart positions
Title	Album details	Peak chart positions
Title	Album details	US Indie
Gold	Released: January 15, 2016; Label: EGR Music Group; Format: Digital download	10

=== Extended plays ===
List of extended plays, with selected chart positions
Title	Album details	Peak chart positions		
Title	Album details	US	US Digital	US Indie
RPD	Released: January 26, 2015; Label: Independent; Format: Digital download	70	20	11

=== Singles ===
List of singles, with selected chart positions
Title	Year	Peak chart positions	Album
Title	Year	US Pop Digital	Album
"Ordinary"	2014	29	Non-album singles
"Nobody"	2014	47	Non-album singles
"Ignite"	2015	—	RPD
"Beat"	2015	48	Non-album single
"Steal the Show" (featuring Trevor Moran)	2015	—	Gold
"Problematic" (featuring Snoop Dogg)	2015	—	Gold
"—" denotes a title that did not chart, or was not released in that territory.

== Filmography ==
=== Television ===
Television	Year	Role	Notes
The Soup Investigates	2013	Himself	Episode #1.4
AwesomenessTV	2013	Various	Himself
Teen Wolf	2014	—N/a	Episode "More Bad than Good"

=== Films ===
Film	Year	Role	Notes
#O2LFOREVER	2015	Himself	Documentary

== Bibliography ==
- Follow Me: A Memoir in Challenges (2016)
