= JC Caylen =

American YouTuber (born 1992)

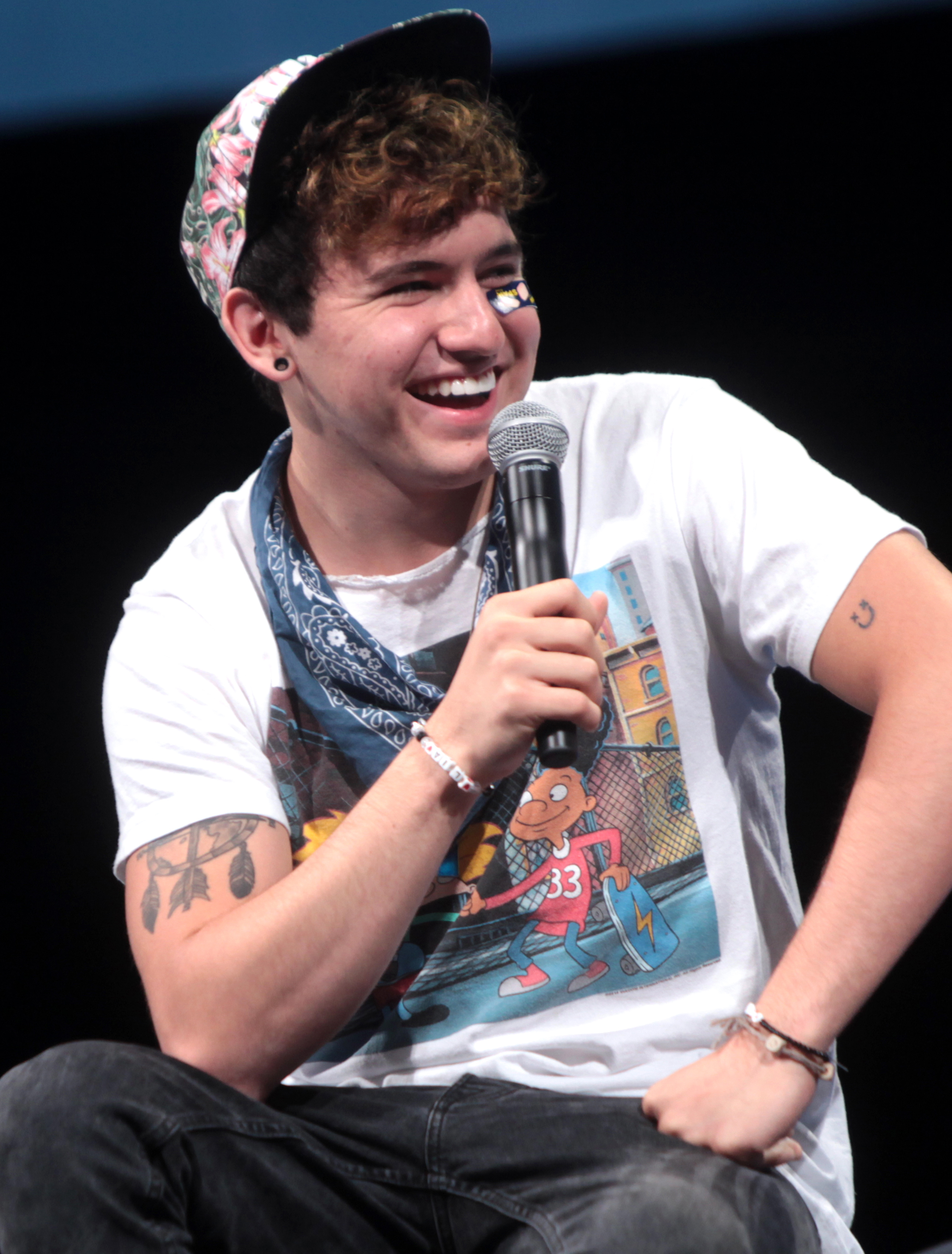
- Caylen at VidCon 2014
- Born: Justin Caylen Castillo; September 11, 1992 (age 34); Houston, Texas, U.S.
- Occupations: YouTuber; comedian; actor; streamer
- Spouse: Chelsey Amaro (m. 2025)
- Children: 1

YouTube information
- Channels: Jc Caylen; KianAndJc
- Years active: 2010–present
- Genres: Vlogs; comedy; challenges; music
- Subscribers: 2.67 million (Jc Caylen); 3.72 million (KianAndJc)
- Views: 184 million (Jc Caylen); 881 million (KianAndJc)
- Last updated: June 19, 2026

JC Caylen (born Justin Caylen Castillo; September 11, 1992) is an American YouTube personality and actor from Houston, Texas.

== Early life and education ==
Jc Caylen was born in Houston, Texas. He and his family moved to San Antonio, Texas, where he grew up. He has three siblings; Jaylyn, Ava Grace and Joe Felix. His parents divorced when he was very young. Caylen attended high school at Sandra Day O'Connor High School in Helotes, Texas. He briefly attended The University of Texas at San Antonio before dropping out to focus on his YouTube career.

== Career ==
Caylen began his career on YouTube, uploading his first public video to his channel, Life with Jc, in 2010. Caylen also gained exposure due to the YouTube supergroup Our2ndLife where he, Connor Franta, Ricky Dillon, Kian Lawley, Trevi Moran and Sam Pottorff went on an international tour and amassed a total 2.7 million subscribers before the group broke up in December 2014.

In 2015, Caylen's compilation album Neptones hit number one on the Top Dance/rap Albums chart, according to Billboard Magazine, the album was from Heard Well, a record label started by YouTube user Connor Franta, CAA new Agent Andrew Graham and entrepreneur Jeremy Wineberg.

In addition to his YouTube career, Caylen also has appeared as an actor in several films and television series. In an interview with AOL, Caylen stated about his YouTube presence affecting his acting career, saying "I'd say that it's impacted my career so much because people see my personality on YouTube and they want to work with me more.. It's almost like a video resume because I have my own personality on YouTube and since I don't play a character, they can see who I am and what I'm about. I feel like they know me on a personal level and know what I will be like to work with." Caylen played Mikey in the 2016 Tyler Perry comedy Boo! A Madea Halloween, and its 2017 sequel, Boo 2! A Madea Halloween.

== Filmography ==
=== Television ===
Year	Series	Role	Notes
2014	Teen Wolf	Unnamed background character	Episode: "More Bad Than Good"
2016	Making Moves	Himself	Episode: "The Name Part 2"
2016	The YouTube Killer	Himself	Short film
2016	Fight of the Living Dead: Experiment 88	Himself	Reality web series, survived
2017	T@gged	Sean	23 episodes
2017	H8ters	Himself / Zweeb / Gui Spice	10 episodes
2017	Apologies In Advance with Andrea Russett	Himself	Episode: "JC Caylen"
2018	Escape the Night	Himself as The Hippie	Reality web series,2 episodes
2019	Tell Me a Story		Season 2

=== Films ===
Year	Film	Role	Notes
2015	#O2LFOREVER	Himself	Documentary
2016	Sickhouse	Himself	
2016	Boo! A Madea Halloween	Mikey	
2017	Party Boat	Officer Hicks	Crackle film
2017	Boo 2! A Madea Halloween	Mikey	

== See also ==
- Internet celebrity
- List of YouTubers
- Social impact of YouTube
