= Note to Self (book) =

2017 memoir by Connor Franta

- Author: Connor Franta
- Language: English
- Genre: Memoir, Poetry, LGBT
- Published: April 18, 2017
- Publisher: Atria/Keywords Press, an imprint of Simon & Schuster
- Publication place: United States
- ISBN: 9781501158018

Note to Self is a memoir released by American YouTuber, entrepreneur, and author Connor Franta. It was released on April 18, 2017 by Atria/Keywords Press, an imprint of Simon & Schuster. It follows his 2015 memoir, A Work in Progress, and is succeeded by the 2021 memoir House Fires.

The book was written as a cathartic outlet, while Franta undertook therapy for clinically-diagnosed depression in 2015. The sections are composed of short personal essays, stories, poetry, photography, letters to his past and future selves, and diary-style entries which focus on his experiences of depression, loss in love, coming out of the closet and social anxiety.

A Rockville tour event for the book included an adaption into an interactive three-room sensory art exhibition, alongside a question and answer session with Franta.

== Critical reception and reviews ==
Common Sense Media gave Note to Self a rating of four out of five stars, stating, in part, "Mature teens and young adults will [find] a lot to reflect on, as they’re figuring out how to be true to themselves... and how they have and will change during an important, formative time in their lives. ...Readers will be encouraged to make connections to their own experiences and feelings and to make connections with others in turn." Moreover, it is also rated as a 14+ book by the Common Sense Media, in part, "Sexual content is mild and infrequent, with a couple of kisses mentioned and some talk about "hookup" culture as negative. A couple of times he mentions having thought [sic] about suicide".

It ranked as the twelfth bestselling hardcover nonfiction book in the New York Times for late April 2017.

The book was listed as number 9 in the Top Ten Biographies in Australia's The Sunday Age in July 2017.
