= Landscapes (Anthony Quintal album) =

Compilation album by various artists
- Released: September 8, 2015
- Genres: alternative; electronic; pop

Landscapes is an American compilation album curated by Anthony Quintal, made available for preorder on August 21, 2015, and finally released on September 8, 2015 for digital purchase, and on September 11, 2015 for physical purchase. It features songs from twelve of his favorite emerging alternative, electronic, and pop musicians from around the world, and even debuted at number three on the Top Dance/Electronic Albums chart.

According to Quintal, “Music has always been a deep part of [his] identity, and something [his] viewers have been asking for more access to.” He also stated that it's “a great way for [him] to share the music [he] love[s] with [his] fans, give more access into [his] personal tastes, and help promote musicians [he] love[s].” The official website suggests that the album “is the first compilation in the Lohanthony music series,” implying that there are more to come. The website also suggests that “th[is] album represents an escape. [T]he world has opened [Quintal's] eyes to what this beautiful planet has to offer; landscapes. For [Quintal], that's exactly what he experiences when he listens to new music. With this compilation, he hopes to spread awareness of these hidden, but electric tracks and artists that ooze fabulousness. Every track [featured on] Landscapes is guaranteed to do nothing but take you to places you've never been before.”
