= Trevi Moran =

American musician and YouTuber

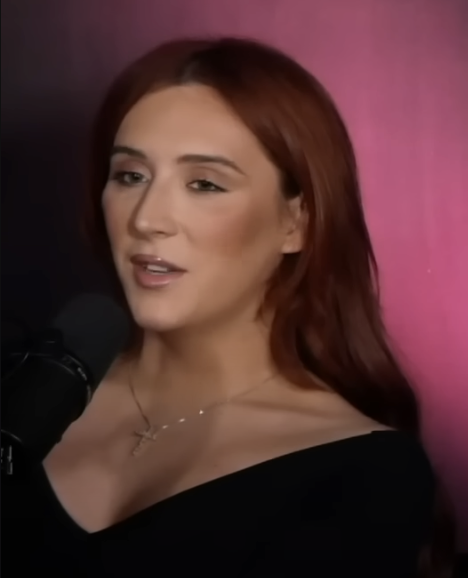
- Moran on a podcast in 2024
- Born: September 30, 1998 (age 28); Poway, California, U.S.
- Occupations: Singer; YouTuber
- Musical career
- Genres: Pop; EDM

YouTube information
- Channel: Trevi Moran
- Years active: 2009–present
- Subscribers: 1.37 million
- Views: 128.4 million
- Last updated: March 29, 2026

Trevi Michaela Moran (born September 30, 1998) is an American singer and YouTube personality. She rose to fame after participating in The X Factor in 2012 at the age of 13. As of April 2020, Moran's YouTube channel surpassed 1.4 million subscribers.

== Early life ==
Moran was born in Poway, California, on September 30, 1998. She has an older brother. Moran joined YouTube in 2008 at age 10, where she began uploading videos of herself dancing to popular songs at the Apple Store, titled "Apple Store Dances". In August 2012, Moran joined the YouTuber group Our2ndLife along with Connor Franta, JC Caylen, Kian Lawley, Ricky Dillon, and Sam Pottorff, which hit three million subscribers before disbanding in December 2014.

== Career ==
In 2012, Moran became widely known when auditioning for The X Factor with the LMFAO song "Sexy and I Know It" (2011) at age 13. Moran received four votes from the judges, but was later eliminated during the "Boot Camp" stage. She was then chosen to be part of the live auditions held in San Francisco. In early September 2013, Moran released her debut major-label single entitled "Someone". In early December 2013, Moran released another single, entitled "The Dark Side" with much success and entered the Billboard Dance/Electronic Digital Songs chart at number 25. In June 2014, Moran released a single titled "Echo" and later another three singles titled "XIAT", "Now or Never", and "Slay" from her EP titled XIAT. On December 9, Moran released her debut EP XIAT charting at number one on Billboard's Top Heatseekers chart.

== Personal life ==
On October 9, 2015, Moran publicly came out as gay in a YouTube video. On June 6, 2020, Moran came out as transgender; she had begun the process of medically transitioning two months prior.

== Discography ==
=== Extended plays ===
List of extended plays, with selected chart positions
Title	Album details	Peak chart positions	
Title	Album details	US Heat	US Indie
XIAT	Released: December 9, 2014; Label: Gotham Alpha; Format: Digital download	1	17
Alive	Released: January 22, 2016; Label: Gotham Alpha; Format: Digital download	1	10
Freedom	Released: July 3, 2020; Label: Self-released; Format: Digital download	—	—
"—" denotes a title that did not chart, or was not released in that territory.

=== Singles ===
==== As lead artist ====
List of singles as lead artist, with selected chart positions
Title	Year	Peak chart positions		Album
Title	Year	US Dance/ Elec.	US Dance/ Elec. Digital	Album
"Bust the Floor"	2011	—	—	Non-album singles
"Someone"	2013	38	26	Non-album singles
"The Dark Side"	2013	24	18	Non-album singles
"Echo"	2014	—	—	XIAT
"XIAT"	2014	—	—	XIAT
"I Wanna Fly"	2015	—	—	Alive
"Let's Roll"	2015	—	—	Alive
"Got Me Feelin' Like"	2016	—	—	Alive
"Get Me Through the Night"	2016	—	—	—N/a
"Sinner"	2017	—	—	—N/a
"Bad Bitch"	2018	—	—	—N/a
"On My Own"	2019	—	—	—N/a
"Now You Got Me"	2019	—	—	—N/a
"Crisis"	2020	—	—	
"Cheers"	2020	—	—	
"Faces "	2021	—	—	
"Dose"	2022	—	—	
"Too hot to be this hungover"	2022	—	—	
"Confession"	2023	—	—	
"Echo (Trevi's version)"	2023	—	—	
"Digital Emphathy"	2025	--	--	
"—" denotes a title that did not chart, or was not released in that territory.

==== As featured artist ====
List of singles as featured artist
Title	Year	Album
"Steal the Show" (Ricky Dillon featuring Moran)	2015	Gold

== Filmography ==
=== Television ===
Year	Film	Role	Notes
2012	The X-Factor	Herself	Season 2 contestant
2014	Astronauts@	Herself	2 episodes
2016	Shane & Friends	Herself	Season 1, episode 31
2016	Zall Good	Herself	Season 2, episode 5
2017	Apologies in Advance with Andrea Russett	Herself	Season 1, episode 1
2017	Hey Qween!	Herself	Season 5, episode 9

=== Film ===
Year	Film	Role	Notes
2014	Jack & Jack the Movie	Uncredited role	Documentary
2015	#O2LFOREVER	Herself	Documentary

== Awards and nominations ==
Year	Award	Category	Recipient	Result
2014	Teen Choice Awards	Choice Web Star: Comedy	Herself	Won
2015	Macy's iHeartRadio Rising Star	—N/a	Herself	Nominated (Note: Moran failed to win the award, ranking second after Christina Grimmie.)
