= List of awards and nominations received by Tyler Perry =

Tyler Perry
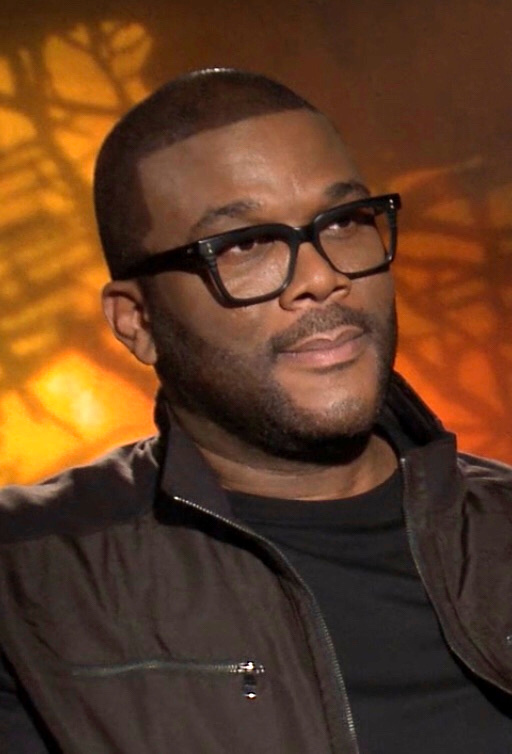
- Perry being interviewed for Boo! A Madea Halloween in 2016
- Born: Emmitt Perry Jr.
- Occupation: Actor
- Years active: 1992–present

This is a list of awards and nominations received by American actor, filmmaker, writer, and songwriter Tyler Perry.

== Major associations ==
=== Academy Awards ===
Year	Nominated work	Category	Result	Ref.
2021	Tyler Perry	Jean Hersholt Humanitarian Award	Honored	

=== Primetime Emmy Awards ===
Year	Nominated work	Category	Result	Ref.
2020	Tyler Perry and The Perry Foundation	Governors Award	Honored	

=== Actor Awards ===
Year	Nominated work	Category	Result	Ref.
2022	Don't Look Up	Outstanding Performance by a Cast in a Motion Picture	Nominated	

== Miscellaneous awards ==
=== African-American Film Critics Association ===
Year	Nominated work	Category	Result	Ref.
2014	Gone Girl	Best Supporting Actor	Won	

=== Alliance of Women Film Journalists ===
Year	Nominated work	Category	Result	Ref.
2009	Precious	Best Picture	Nominated	

=== BET Awards ===
Year	Nominated work	Category	Result	Ref.
2012	Good Deeds	Best Movie	Nominated	
2019	—N/a	Ultimate Icon Award	Won	

=== BET Comedy Awards ===
Year	Nominated work	Category	Result	Ref.
2005	Diary of a Mad Black Woman	Outstanding Actor in a Theatrical Film	Won	
2005	Diary of a Mad Black Woman	Outstanding Writing for Theatrical Film	Won	

=== Black Movie Awards ===
Year	Nominated work	Category	Result	Ref.
2005	Diary of a Mad Black Woman	Outstanding Motion Picture	Nominated	
2006	Madea's Family Reunion	Outstanding Achievement in Screenwriting	Nominated	
2006	Madea's Family Reunion	Outstanding Motion Picture	Nominated	

=== Black Reel Awards ===
Year	Nominated work	Category	Result	Ref.
2006	Diary of a Mad Black Woman	Best Breakthrough Performance	Nominated	
2006	Diary of a Mad Black Woman	Outstanding Screenplay, Adapted or Original	Nominated	
2007	Madea's Family Reunion	Outstanding Screenplay, Adapted or Original	Nominated	
2008	Meet the Browns	Outstanding Screenplay, Adapted or Original	Nominated	
2008	The Family That Preys	Outstanding Screenplay, Adapted or Original	Nominated	

=== Boston Society of Film Critics ===
Year	Nominated work	Category	Result	Ref.
2009	Star Trek	Best Cast	Won	

=== Central Ohio Film Critics Association ===
Year	Nominated work	Category	Result	Ref.
2015	Gone Girl	Best Ensemble	Nominated	

=== Georgia Film Critics Association ===
Year	Nominated work	Category	Result	Ref.
2015	Gone Girl	Best Ensemble	Nominated	

=== Gold Derby Awards ===
Year	Nominated work	Category	Result	Ref.
2015	Gone Girl	Ensemble Cast	Nominated	

=== Golden Raspberry Awards ===
Year	Nominated work	Category	Result	Ref.
2013	Madea's Witness Protection	Worst Director	Nominated	
2013	Good Deeds	Worst Director	Nominated	
2013	Good Deeds	Worst Actor	Nominated	
2013	Alex Cross	Worst Actor	Nominated	
2013	Madea's Witness Protection	Worst Actress	Nominated	
2013	Madea's Witness Protection	Worst Prequel, Remake, Rip-off or Sequel	Nominated	
2013	Madea's Witness Protection	Worst Screen Couple	Nominated	
2013	Madea's Witness Protection	Worst Screen Ensemble	Nominated	
2014	A Madea Christmas	Worst Picture	Nominated	
2014	A Madea Christmas	Worst Director	Nominated	
2014	Temptation: Confessions of a Marriage Counselor	Worst Director	Nominated	
2014	A Madea Christmas	Worst Actress	Won	
2014	A Madea Christmas	Worst Screenplay	Nominated	
2014	A Madea Christmas	Worst Screen Combo	Nominated	
2017	Boo! A Madea Halloween	Worst Director	Nominated	
2017	Boo! A Madea Halloween	Worst Actress	Nominated	
2017	Boo! A Madea Halloween	Worst Screen Combo	Nominated	
2018	Boo 2! A Madea Halloween	Worst Actress	Won	
2018	Boo 2! A Madea Halloween	Worst Combo	Nominated	
2019	Vice	Razzie Redeemer Award	Nominated	
2020	A Madea Family Funeral	Worst Picture	Nominated	
2020	A Madea Family Funeral	Worst Actress	Nominated	
2020	A Madea Family Funeral	Worst Supporting Actor (Note: Perry was nominated twice for Worst Supporting Actor in A Madea Family Funeral, one each for his roles as Joe and Uncle Heathrow, respectively.)*	Nominated	
2020	A Madea Family Funeral	Worst Supporting Actor*	Nominated	
2020	A Madea Family Funeral	Worst Screenplay	Nominated	
2020	A Madea Family Funeral	Worst Screen Combo	Nominated	
2020	A Madea Family Funeral	Worst Prequel, Remake, Rip-off or Sequel	Nominated	

=== MTV Movie & TV Awards ===
Year	Nominated work	Category	Result	Ref.
2005	Diary of a Mad Black Woman	Male Breakthrough Performance	Nominated	
2006	Madea's Family Reunion	Best Comedic Performance	Nominated	

=== NAACP Image Awards ===
Year	Nominated work	Category	Result	Ref.
2007	Madea's Family Reunion	Outstanding Directing in a Motion Picture or Television Movie	Nominated	
2007	Madea's Family Reunion	Outstanding Writing in a Motion Picture or Television Movie	Nominated	
2008	Why Did I Get Married?	Outstanding Supporting Actor in a Motion Picture	Nominated	
2009	The Family That Preys	Outstanding Directing in a Motion Picture or Television Movie	Nominated	
2011	For Colored Girls	Outstanding Motion Picture	Won	
2011	For Colored Girls	Outstanding Directing for a Motion Picture/Television Movie	Won	
2025	The Six Triple Eight	Outstanding Motion Picture	Won	
2026	Straw (film)	Outstanding Television Movie, Mini-Series or Special	Won	

=== Nickelodeon Kids' Choice Awards ===
Year	Nominated work	Category	Result	Ref.
2010	Madea Goes To Jail	Favorite Movie Actor	Nominated	

=== Stinkers Bad Movie Awards ===
Year	Nominated work	Category	Result	Ref.
2005	Diary of a Mad Black Woman	Worst Supporting Actor	Won	
