= Diamond White =

American singer and actress (born 1999)

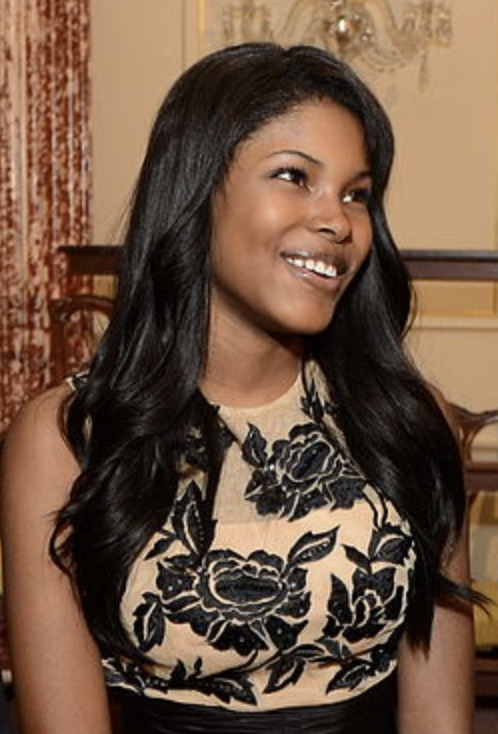
- White in June 2013
- Born: January 1, 1999 (age 27)
- Occupations: Singer; actress
- Years active: 2007–present
- Musical career
- Genres: Pop; R&B
- Instrument: Vocals

Diamond White (born January 1, 1999) is an American singer and actress. In 2012, she was a contestant on the second season of the U.S. version of The X Factor, where she became the ninth contestant eliminated in the competition. She voices Frankie Greene on the Discovery Family series Transformers: Rescue Bots, Fuli on the Disney Junior series The Lion Guard and had a cameo appearance on The Haunted Hathaways and has recurring roles on Sofia the First and Phineas and Ferb. She also provided the voice of Babs Byuteman on the 2019 Netflix series, Pinky Malinky. From November 2020 to July 2024, she played the contract role of Paris Buckingham on the CBS soap opera The Bold and the Beautiful. In 2021, she began voicing Lunella Lafayette/Moon Girl in the Disney Channel animated series Moon Girl and Devil Dinosaur, which premiered in early 2023.

== Life and career ==
=== 2007–2012: Early career and The X Factor ===
In 2007, White starred in a Chicago-based production of The Color Purple that toured nationally. In 2010, at the age of 11, White played young Nala in Disney's The Lion King musical. She auditioned for The X Factor in San Francisco, California with "It's a Man's Man's Man's World" by James Brown. At the Bootcamp Part 1, White sang "I Have Nothing" by Whitney Houston, from the film The Bodyguard. At Part 2, she was against Dinah Jane and they sang "Stronger". In the judges' home round, White sang Avril Lavigne's "I'm With You". Her mentor, Britney Spears, chose her to compete in the live shows. White performed "Hey, Soul Sister" during the first live show on October 31, 2012. On November 1, 2012, during the first live results show, White, along with Arin Ray, were put into a sing-off, with one of the contestants remaining in the competition and the other going home. White performed "Sorry Seems to Be the Hardest Word". Spears selected Ray to remain in the competition, sending White home. However, on the November 7, 2012 episode, White was reinstated into the competition as a wildcard, creating a Top 13. On the second live show that aired that same night, she again performed "I Have Nothing", receiving positive reactions from the judges and advancing into the Top 12. On November 14, 2012, she performed "Halo" and advanced into the Top 10. On November 21, 2012, she performed "Because You Loved Me" which earned her a spot in the Top 8. On November 28, 2012, she performed Whitney Houston's "I Wanna Dance with Somebody (Who Loves Me)" and was put into the Bottom Two along with Vino Alan, where she performed "I Was Here". The judges saved White, sending Alan home and advancing her to the Top 6. White performed James Brown's "It's a Man's Man's Man's World" and "Diamonds" during the December 5, 2012 episode and was put into the Bottom Two for the second time along with Fifth Harmony, where White performed "I Hope You Dance". The judges saved Fifth Harmony and sent White home for a second time.

=== 2013–present: Acting ===
In March 2013, White had a small role on The Big Bang Theory. She also performed a song with Toby Gad ("Peace") for world refugee day. In July 2013, White was featured in an episode of the Nickelodeon television series The Haunted Hathaways, thereafter becoming a recurring character on the show. She also voices the recurring character Ruby on the Disney Junior show Sofia the First. In May 2015, White was featured in a YouTube mashup of "Shut Up and Dance" by Walk the Moon and "Want to Want Me" by Jason Derulo with artist Sam Tsui. In June 2015, White announced during one of her videos that she was finishing her debut album and she was releasing the first single off of it soon. In September 2015, the first single "Born Rich" was released off the Pressure EP; White also released another song in October called "Lie On The Night". The EP was released in December 2015. In November 2015, White voiced Fuli the Cheetah in the television pilot film The Lion Guard: Return of the Roar and later on its TV show The Lion Guard which premiered in January 2016. In late-2016, White guest-starred as Sage on the third and final season of the Disney Channel television series Girl Meets World. In October 2016, White starred as Tiffany Simmons in Tyler Perry's horror comedy Boo! A Madea Halloween and, in October 2017, reprised her role in the sequel Boo 2! A Madea Halloween. White also portrayed the role of Piper in the 2018 film Rock Steady Row. White was also cast as a recurring guest star in the final season of Empire, a Fox series. She also played Babs Byuteman in the animated series Pinky Malinky in 2019. In 2020, she joined the cast of the CBS soap opera The Bold and the Beautiful as Paris Buckingham, sister of established character, Zoe Buckingham (Kiara Barnes); she made her debut on November 2, 2020. White also voiced the title character in Moon Girl and Devil Dinosaur and reprises her role in Spidey and His Amazing Friends.

== Filmography ==
=== Film ===
Year	Title	Role	Notes
2011	Phineas and Ferb the Movie: Across the 2nd Dimension	Additional voices	
2015	The Lion Guard: Return of the Roar	Fuli (voice)	
2016	Boo! A Madea Halloween	Tiffany Simmons	
2017	The Lion Guard: The Rise of Scar	Fuli (voice)	
2017	The Emoji Movie	Additional voices	
2017	Boo 2! A Madea Halloween	Tiffany Simmons	
2017	F the Prom	Rayna	
2018	Rock Steady Row	Piper	
2025	Madea's Destination Wedding	Tiffany Simmons	

=== Television ===
Year	Title	Role	Notes
2010–2014, 2025	Phineas and Ferb	Holly (voice)	Recurring role
2011–2016	Transformers: Rescue Bots	Francine Greene, additional voices	Main cast
2012	The X Factor	Herself	Season 2
2013	The Big Bang Theory	Girl #2	Episode: "The Contractual Obligation Implementation"
2013–2015	The Haunted Hathaways	Sophie	Recurring role
2013–2018	Sofia the First	Ruby (voice)	Recurring role
2016	Girl Meets World	Sage	Episode: "Girl Meets Triangle"
2016	Black-ish	Kiersten	Episode: "Old Digger"
2016–2019	The Lion Guard	Fuli (voice)	Main role
2016	Sing It!	Maisy	Recurring role
2017	Fresh Off the Boat	Jackie	Recurring
2018	Code Black	Caitlyn Quick	Episode: "The Same As Air"
2018–2019	Dear White People	Penelope Conners-Fairbanks	Recurring role
2019	Pinky Malinky	Babs Byuteman, additional voices	Main cast
2019–2020	Empire	Lala	Recurring role
2020–2024	The Bold and the Beautiful	Paris Buckingham	Series regular
2023–2025	Moon Girl and Devil Dinosaur	Lunella Lafayette / Moon Girl, Devil Girl (voice)	Lead role Won – Annie Award for Outstanding Achievement for Voice Acting in an Animated Television/Broadcast Production
2024	LEGO Marvel Avengers: Mission Demolition	Lunella Lafayette / Moon Girl (voice)	Disney+ television special
2024–2025	Barbie Mysteries	Barbie "Brooklyn" Roberts (voice)	Main cast
2024	Spidey and His Amazing Friends	Lunella Lafayette / Moon Girl (voice)	Episode: "Moon Girl and the Dino Dilemma"
2024	Your Friendly Neighborhood Spider-Man	Additional voices	
2026	Sofia the First: Royal Magic	Ruby (voice)	Recurring role

=== Video games ===
Year	Title	Role	Notes
2026	Marvel Rivals	Lunella Lafayette / Moon Girl	

=== Web series ===
Year	Title	Role	Notes
2023	How NOT to Draw	Lunella Lafayette / Moon Girl (voice)	Episode: "How NOT to Draw Moon Girl"
2024	Theme Song Takeover	Lunella Lafayette / Moon Girl (voice)	Episode: "Devil Theme Song Takeover"
2024	Moon Girl's Lab	Lunella Lafayette / Moon Girl (voice)	Short series

== Discography ==
=== Albums ===
List of studio albums, with selected details, chart positions
Title	Album details	
Title	Album details	US
Tomorrow	Release: October 23, 2020; Label: Independent; Formats: Digital download	–
Summerland	Release: August 13, 2021; Label: Diamond White; Formats: Digital download, vinyl	–

=== Singles ===
==== As lead artist ====
List of singles as lead artist, with year released and album name showing
Title	Single details	
Title	Single details	US
"Empty Cup"	Release: October 5, 2017; Label: Arthouse Records; Formats: Digital download	–
"Cleopatron (Drunk on Me)"	Release: November 15, 2017; Label: Arthouse Records; Formats: Digital download	–
"Ringtone" (featuring Oliva O'Brien)	Release: July 20, 2018; Label: Arthouse Records; Formats: Digital download, streaming	–
"Love Songs 4"	Release: August 9, 2019; Label: Independent; Formats: Digital download, streaming	–
"Pretty Brown Skin"	Release: January 1, 2020; Label: Independent; Formats: Digital download, streaming	–
"(F*ck) What I Need"	Release: March 27, 2020; Label: Independent; Formats: Digital download, streaming	–
"Love Song 4" (acoustic)	Release: February 26, 2021; Label: Diamond White; Formats: Digital download, streaming	–
"Digitally Yours"	Release: June 18, 2021; Label: Diamond White; Formats: Digital download, streaming	–
"Oh No!"	Release: July 16, 2021; Label: Diamond White; Formats: Digital download, streaming	–
"Cover My Eyes Remix" (feat. OKAYKRISS)	Release: January 28, 2022; Label: Diamond White; Formats: Digital download, streaming	–
"Moon Girl Magic" (theme from Moon Girl and Devil Dinosaur)	Release: November 14, 2022; Label: Walt Disney Records; Formats: Digital download, streaming	–
