= Tyler Perry's A Madea Christmas =

Tyler Perry's A Madea Christmas may refer to:

- A Madea Christmas (musical play), a 2011 stage play
- A Madea Christmas (film), a 2013 film
