= Brock O'Hurn =

American actor

- Born: August 19, 1991 (age 35); Sacramento, California, U.S.
- Occupations: Actor, model, fitness trainer, producer
- Years active: 2016-present
- Organizations: O'Hurn Media Inc.; Outlaw Logic Pictures
- Height: 6 ft 7 in (2.01 m)
- Website: brockohurn.com

Signature
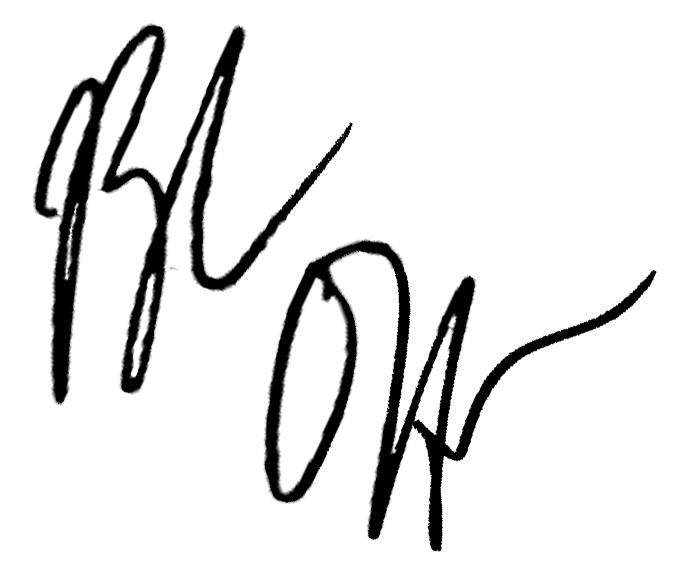

Brock O'Hurn (born August 19, 1991), is an American model, actor, fitness trainer, and producer. He gained recognition through his Instagram account for popularizing the man bun. He has also founded two companies, O'Hurn Media Inc. and Outlaw Logic Pictures (2021).

== Early life ==
O'Hurn was born in Sacramento, California, the second oldest of cleaning company owner Paige (née Hillenbrand) and Adam Hurn, who separated when he was nine years old. He has four siblings, sisters Aspyn and Carly, and brothers Dagan and Drake. He is of English, Irish, French and German descent. Brock added the O' because he says his family's original name in Ireland was O'Hearn and he wanted to get back to its roots. O'Hurn attended nine different schools in Orange County, Palm Springs, and San Bernardino, California, causing his education to suffer. O'Hurn discovered bodybuilding during his sophomore year in high school after being dissatisfied with his body, weighing at 135 pounds (61 kg) at the time.

At the age of 12, he knew he wanted to become an actor. O'Hurn starred in his first play as "Jack" from 'Jack and the Beanstalk'.

O'Hurn swept floors and bagged bread at a bakery. After graduation, O'Hurn briefly worked with his uncle's company that installed heating and cooling systems before getting a job in Mission Viejo, Orange County for Abercrombie & Fitch and subsequently working as a salesman for True Religion, which taught him the value of customer service and helped him overcome his natural shyness. In a 2015 interview with Buzzfeed, he said: "Don't get me wrong. I like Abercrombie. There's nothing wrong with them. They're awesome. It's just... That wasn't my dream, you know. That's not my goal. That's not what I was passionate about."

He used to manage a moving company with his brother, when he was 18.

O'Hurn started training clients online in 2015, charging $100 to $150 for a month's worth of programs, which is what he was living on when he moved to Los Angeles.

== Career ==
O'Hurn gained international fame through his Instagram account where he was recognized for his height, physique and for popularizing the man bun. He admitted that he was confused by the sudden fame saying, "I was like, 'Is this a joke? Do I just have to keep lifting people? This is my life?'" His mother's boyfriend, David "Dave" Harris, is his manager and also the Vice President of his company O'Hurn Media Inc. since January 2016.

In 2015, he worked for LG Electronics to model for their LG Tone Active Headphones. O'Hurn worked with Tyler Perry in his 2016 film Boo! A Madea Halloween, making his acting debut as frat boy Horse. He reprised the role in the sequel Boo 2! A Madea Halloween (2017). He also stars in Perry's television series Too Close to Home.

In 2020, he worked as the cover model for the books and audiobooks "Blood of Zeus" and "Heart of Fire", the "Blood of Zeus" book series by Meredith Wild and Angel Payne. The third book and audiobook "Fate of Storms" was released in 2021, where he also worked as a cover model.

He played the role of "Chris" in the 2021 horror movie 'The Resort', where he also loved working as a producer.

In June 2021, he founded Outlaw Logic Pictures, a production and media company based out of Los Angeles, CA.

== Philanthropy ==
O'Hurn supports the Black Lives Matter movement. In an interview with the "Muscle and Health" magazine he said 'at least one thousand of us gathered to ride [motorcycles] for change'. He also supports the Dave Thomas Foundation for Adoption and local charities.

In 2019, he supported the "Million Dollar Vegan" charity that was going to donate $1,000,000, if they could collect enough signatures to make the pope become a vegan. He partnered with the LAFD for another charity.

== Personal life ==
Since he started with fitness at the age of 15, he has been working out every day, sometimes twice a day. He has been living in Hollywood for at least eight years, as of 2021, when the first place he moved into was a room from a friend on Hollywood Boulevard. He also enjoys reading and riding his Harley Davidson.

== Film ==
Year	Title	Role	Notes	Refs.
2016	Boo! A Madea Halloween	Horse		
2017	Boo 2! A Madea Halloween	Horse		
2018	Rayden Valkyrie	Ragnar Stormbringer		
2018	Superhero Therapy	Thor	Short film	
2019	Body Swap	Zeus	Short film	
2019	My Name is Josy	Bartender Jupiter Rourke	Short film	
2020	Wild Western Showdown	Cowboy	Short film	
2021	The Resort	Chris		
2022	Desperate Riders	Thatch		
2022	Zodiac	Zeus	Post Production	
2024	Players	Brady Stratton		
2024	The Trainer			

== Television ==
Year	Title	Role	Notes	Refs.
2016–2017	Too Close to Home	Brody Allen	16 Episodes	
2019, 2022	Euphoria	Super Hot Warrior Man	2 episodes: "Made You Look" and "Out of Touch"	
2020	The Real Bros of Simi Valley	Keto	3 episodes	
2022	The Righteous Gemstones	Torsten	6 episodes	
2022-2023	Young Rock	Hulk Hogan	3 episodes	
2023	History of the World, Part II	White Jesus	Episode: VIII	

== Music video ==
Year	Title	Artist(s)	Refs.
2015	"Keep Swinging"	Blitz Kids	
