= Patrice Lovely =

American actress (born 1968)

- Born: January 4, 1968 (age 58)
- Occupation: Actress
- Years active: 1997–present

Patrice Lovely (born January 4, 1968) is an American actress. She is best known for her role as Hattie Mae Love in the sitcom Love Thy Neighbor and the comedy films Boo! A Madea Halloween, Boo 2! A Madea Halloween, and A Madea Family Funeral, the latter of which was released on March 1, 2019.

== Career ==
Lovely started acting in 1997. In 2004, she joined the UniverSoul Circus as a ringmaster alongside Shuckey Duckey as Ms. Mabelle. In 2009, she played "Auntie" at the UniverSoul circus. She returned to the Big Top in 2010 as Grandma Maggie with Daniel "Lucky" Malatsi playing her grandson. In 2011, Lovely debuted on the stage for A Madea's Christmas, then she has been in other shows such as fan favorite I Don't Want to Do Wrong. In 2013, she joined the cast of the new sitcom Love Thy Neighbor. Lovely has recorded two gospel albums, Glory Road and Seven Days.

== Filmography ==
Film
Year	Title	Role	Notes
2011	A Madea Christmas	Miss Hattie Mae Love	Direct to video
2012	Madea Gets a Job	Hattie Mae Love	Direct to video
2012	I Don't Want to Do Wrong!	Hattie Mae Love	Direct to video
2012	The Haves and the Have Nots	Hattie Mae Love	Direct to video
2013	Je'Caryous Johnson's Marriage Material	Beulah May	Direct to video
2014	Hell Hath No Fury Like a Woman Scorned	Hattie Mae Love	Direct to video
2016	Boo! A Madea Halloween	Hattie Mae Love	Film
2017	Boo 2! A Madea Halloween	Hattie Mae Love	Film
2019	A Madea Family Funeral	Hattie Mae Love	Film

Television
Year	Title	Role	Notes
2013–2017	Love Thy Neighbor	Hattie Mae Love	OWN: Oprah Winfrey Network
2022-	Ma's House	Ma	Tubi
