= A Madea Christmas =

A Madea Christmas may refer to:

- A Madea Christmas (musical play)
- A Madea Christmas (film)
