= Cheryl Pepsii Riley =

American actress and singer

- Born: Cheryl Bridget Riley; October 18, 1961 (age 64); Brooklyn, New York, U.S.
- Occupations: Singer–songwriter; actress
- Years active: 1982–present
- Spouses: David Jones (m. 1985; div. 2000) Mike Grace (m. 2003; div. 2011)
- Children: 1
- Musical career
- Genres: R&B; soul; dance-pop; gospel
- Instruments: Drums, tambourine and the piano.
- Labels: Reprise; Columbia

Cheryl Bridget "Pepsii" Riley (born October 18, 1961) is an American singer and actress. Riley is best known for her music during the late 1980s through the early 1990s; most notably, 1988's R&B ballad "Thanks for My Child". Riley also starred in Tyler Perry's stage plays including; Madea's Class Reunion (2003) and Why Did I Get Married? (2006).

== Life and career ==
=== Early life and career ===
Born Cheryl Bridget Riley in Brooklyn, New York, Riley was the first of two children born to James Madison Riley and Lucia Viola Riley. Riley attended Clara Barton High School. After high school, Riley worked as a nurse for disabled children before beginning her singing career. Riley began her music career as a lead singer in the band Stargaze, who released the single "You Can't Have It" in 1982.

In November 1988, Riley topped the US R&B chart and hit the Top 40 on the pop chart at number 32 with the ballad, "Thanks for My Child," a song written by Full Force. The song peaked at number 75 in the UK Singles Chart in January 1989. The genesis of "Thanks for My Child" began with Full Force member Bowlegged Lou's experience with the complications of his wife's first pregnancy. The title-track single to her debut LP Me, Myself and I made it to number 18 on the R&B charts in early 1989. Another single, "Every Little Thing About You", peaked at number 55 on the R&B charts later that year.

Her second LP, Chapters, was issued and yielded the singles "How Can You Hurt The One You Love" and a cover of Aretha Franklin's 1968 hit "Ain't No Way". Her third album All That! was released by Reprise, and featured the singles "Gimme" and "Guess I'm In Love".

=== Later career ===
After a hiatus from the entertainment industry, Riley re-emerged in the late 1990s by appearing on the songs "I Love It" and "Look Around" on The Beatnuts album A Musical Massacre. Riley also starred in a number of gospel plays for best-selling playwright Tyler Perry, including Madea's Class Reunion, Madea Goes to Jail, Why Did I Get Married?, Laugh to Keep from Crying, Madea's Big Happy Family and, A Madea Christmas. Riley also appeared in the film versions of Diary of a Mad Black Woman and Madea's Big Happy Family. She is also starred in Tyler Perry's Madea Gets a Job (2012) and Hell Hath No Fury Like a Woman Scorned (2014). She currently has a recurring role in Tyler Perry's House of Payne.

Following her appearance on a number of tracks on the Diary of a Mad Black Woman soundtrack in 2005, the following year Riley released Let Me Be Me, her first album in fourteen years. In 2015 she released a new solo album entitled Still Believe.

=== Personal life ===
Riley married twice and has one child. In 1985, she married fellow Stargaze bandmate David Jones, but they divorced in 2000 after 15 years of marriage. In 2003, Riley married Chicago native Mike Grace, and together raised his son John Grace. In a recent interview with Lenny Green, Riley mentioned that she and Grace had divorced in 2011.

== Discography ==
=== Albums ===
- 1988: Me, Myself And I (#128 Billboard 200, No. 9 R&B/Hip-Hop Albums)
- 1991: Chapters (#62 R&B/Hip-Hop Albums)
- 1993: All That!
- 2006: Let Me Be Me
- 2015: Still Believe

=== Singles ===
- "Thanks for My Child" (1988)
- "My Myself And I" (1988)
- "Every Little Thing About You" (1988)
- "How Can You Hurt The One You Love" (1991)
- "Ain't No Way" (1991)
- "Gimme" (1993)
- "Guess I'm in Love" (1993)
- "Good Lovin'" (1995)
- "Let Me Love You Boy" (Snatch featuring Cheryl Pepsii Riley) (2000)
- "He's a Hurricane" (James Day & U-Nam feat. Cheryl Pepsii Riley) (2018)
