= DK4L =

YouTube vlogger duo

- Born: De'arra Taylor; Kenneth “Ken” Walker

YouTube information
- Channels: De'arra & Ken 4 Life; Vlogs By DK4L
- Years active: 2015–2021
- Genre: Vlog
- Subscribers: 6.07 million (De'arra & Ken 4 Life) 2.86 million (Vlogs By DK4L)
- Views: 765.5 million (De'arra & Ken 4 Life); 287.21 million (Vlogs By DK4L)
- Last updated: June 20, 2020

De'arra Taylor and Kenneth “Ken" Walker, collectively known as DK4L, are former YouTube vloggers based out of Atlanta, Georgia.

== Career ==
Taylor and Walker met in 2014 at a fast food restaurant in Atlanta, shortly after Taylor graduated from high school while Walker was working at a hardware store. The couple gained a fan-base from posting pictures together on Instagram.

In December 2014, the couple created a YouTube channel called De'arra & Ken 4 Life DK4L posting light hearted vlogging content In October 2015, they created the YouTube channel Vlogs by DK4L to document elements of their day-to-day life and travels.

Taylor and Walker appeared in the 2017 feature film, Tyler Perry's Boo 2! A Madea Halloween.

The pair were featured in Season 2 of Fight of the Living Dead, which premiered on October 31, 2017.

By 2019, their YouTube Main channel had reached 5.8 million subscribers and the Vlog Channel had reached 2.5 Million subscribers. After 5 years of dating, in August 2019, the couple got engaged while on vacation in Santorini, Greece.

In August 2021 the couple announced their separation via video. They indicated that they would no longer be uploading content on their shared channels.
