= Cassi Davis =

American actress (born 1964)

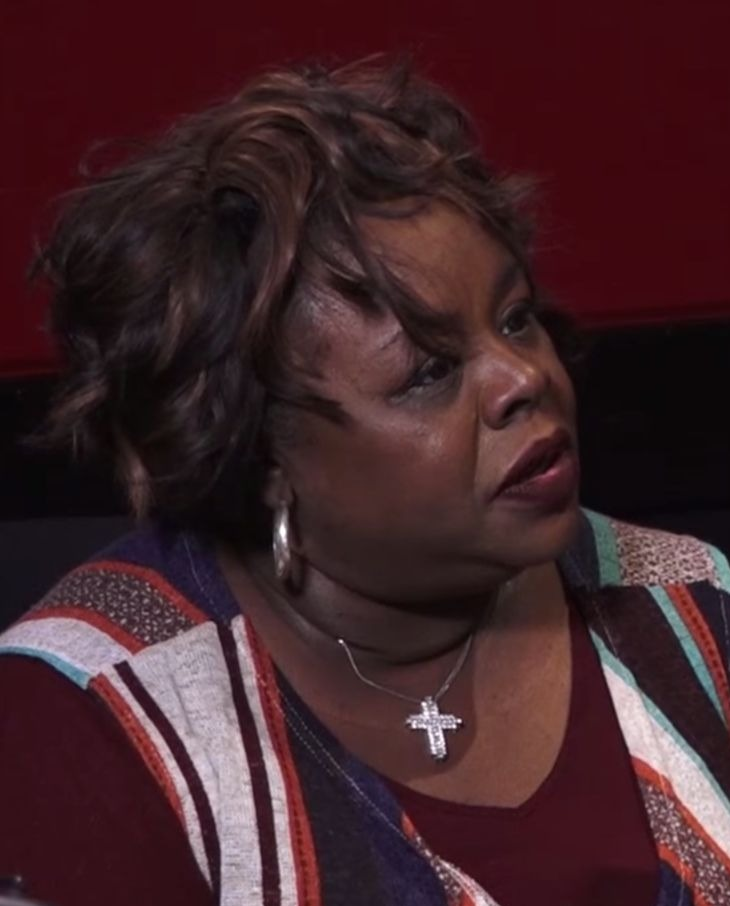
- Davis in 2018
- Born: July 31, 1964 (age 62); Holly Springs, Mississippi, U.S.
- Occupation: Actress
- Years active: 1988–present
- Spouse: Kerry Patton (m. 2017)

Cassi Davis-Patton (born July 31, 1964) is an American actress best known for her role as Ella Payne on Tyler Perry's House of Payne and its spin-off series The Paynes. She is also known as Aunt Bam in the Madea franchise since 2010. She has starred in several other productions under the direction of Tyler Perry.

== Life and career ==
Born in Holly Springs, Mississippi, Davis attended Spelman College in Atlanta and majored in music. She left the college one credit short of graduation, because she was not allowed to perform religious music during her senior recital. Davis returned to Spelman in 2008 to complete her degree, graduating in November of that year. She has credited her devout, born-again Christian faith as the main reason behind her professional success.

Davis' acting career began in 1988 with a supporting role in the Spike Lee comedy film School Daze. Her early television credits include appearances on Living Single, Married... with Children, Kenan & Kel, and The PJ's. She established her acting career by appearing in Tyler Perry productions such as Madea's Family Reunion, Madea Goes to Jail, Daddy's Little Girls, Madea's Big Happy Family, Boo! A Madea Halloween and A Madea Family Funeral.

Davis is best known for her role as Ella Payne in the TBS sitcom Tyler Perry's House of Payne from 2007 to 2012. She received two NAACP Image Award for Outstanding Actress in a Comedy Series for her performance. In 2018, she starred in House of Payne spinoff The Paynes that aired on Oprah Winfrey Network. In 2020, a revival series of House of Payne was ordered on BET.

== Personal life ==
Davis married her longtime boyfriend Kerry Patton on January 11, 2017; prior to their marriage, the two had been dating since 2007. In an interview, Cassi denied having a stroke, but revealed instead that she was diagnosed with Bell's palsy in March 2020.

== Filmography ==
=== Films and plays ===
Year	Film	Role	Notes
1988	School Daze!	Paula	
1994	Silent Bomb	Kate	
2004	He Say... She Say... But What Does GOD Say?	Sister Tiny	
2005	Love on Layaway	Willanetta	
2006	Madea's Family Reunion	Aunt Sarah	
2006	Madea Goes To Jail	Ella Kincaid	
2007	Daddy's Little Girls	Aunt Rita	
2010	Madea's Big Happy Family	Aunt Bam	
2011	Madea's Big Happy Family	Aunt Bam	
2011	A Madea Christmas	Aunt Bam	
2011	Aunt Bam's Place	Aunt Bam	
2014	Madea's Neighbors from Hell	Aunt Bam	
2014	Act of Faith	Brady's wife	
2015	Madea on the Run	Aunt Bam	
2015	Madea's Tough Love	Aunt Bam	voice
2016	Boo! A Madea Halloween	Aunt Bam	
2017	Boo 2! A Madea Halloween	Aunt Bam	
2017	Hamlet & Hutch	Jenice	
2019	Madea's Farewell Play Tour	Aunt Bam	
2019	A Madea Family Funeral	Aunt Bam	
2022	A Madea Homecoming	Aunt Bam	
2025	Madea's Destination Wedding	Aunt Bam	

=== Television ===
Year	Film	Role	Episodes
1993	Living Single	Francine	Episode: "In The Black It's Beautiful"
1994	Chicago Hope	Nurse #1	Episode: "Food Chains"
1996	Moesha		
1996	Married... with Children	Patty	Episode: "Crimes Against Obesity"
1999	Kenan & Kel	Kitty	Episode: "He Got Job"
1999–2001	The PJs	HUD woman (Voice)	Recurring Role; 27 episodes
2000	The Parkers	Big Woman	
2001	Boycott	Cook	Television movie
2007–2012, 2020–present	Tyler Perry's House of Payne	Ella Payne	Lead role; 254 episodes NAACP Image Award for Outstanding Actress in a Comedy Series (2010, 2013); Nominated — NAACP Image Award for Outstanding Actress in a Comedy Series (2009, 2011)
2009	Meet the Browns	Ella Payne	Episode: "Meet the Christmas Spirit"
2015	Love Thy Neighbor	Ella Payne	Episode: "Ella and Curtis"
2018	The Paynes	Ella Payne	Lead role, 38 episodes

== Awards and nominations ==
Year	Award	Category	Work	Result
2020	Golden Raspberry Awards	Worst Supporting Actress	A Madea Family Funeral	Nominated
