= Andre Hall (actor) =

American actor and model (born 1982)

- Born: September 3, 1982 (age 43); Indiana
- Occupation: Actor
- Years active: 2000–present

Andre Hall (born September 3, 1982) is an American actor and model. He is best known for his role as Keri Lewis in the Toni Braxton Bio-pic and as Danny Harris in the Tyler Perry sitcom Love Thy Neighbor.

== Early years ==
Hall was born and raised in Indianapolis, Indiana, and moved to Los Angeles, California in 2008 to pursue his career dreams. He was a model for many campaign advertisements including UGGS Australia, Nike and Bose. To initiate his acting journey, he made appearances in several short films from 2011 to 2012. Additionally, he showcased his talent on stage, taking part in Shakespearean productions of Othello and A Midsummer Night's Dream.

== Career ==
In 2013, Hall was announced as one of the cast members of Tyler Perry's new sitcom, Love Thy Neighbor. In 2015 Hall was cast in Toni Braxton: Unbreak My Heart and to be released in 2016 on Lifetime.

== Filmography ==
Film
Year	Title	Role	Notes
2011	Time of Possession	Jerry	Short film
2012	Far	David	Short film
2013	Enemy Empire	Tut	
2016	Toni Braxton: Unbreak My Heart	Keri Lewis	Television Film
2016	Boo! A Madea Halloween	Quinton	Film
2017	Boo 2! A Madea Halloween	Quinton	Film

Television
Year	Title	Role	Notes
2013–2017	Tyler Perry's Love Thy Neighbor	Danny Harris	Series regular; 118 episodes
