= Hell Hath No Fury Like a Woman Scorned =

2014 American stage play

- Original language: English
- Written by: Tyler Perry
- Characters: Anita, Mama Hattie, Victor, Mona, Jasmine, Reverend Walker and Randy
- Genre: Comedy-Drama

Premiere
- Date: January 15, 2014
- Place: New Orleans

Hell Hath No Fury Like a Woman Scorned is a 2014 American stage play written, produced, and directed by Tyler Perry. It stars Cheryl Pepsii Riley as Anita and Patrice Lovely as Mama Hattie. The live performance released on DVD on November 25, 2014 was recorded live in Atlanta at the Cobb Energy Performing Arts Centre in September 2013. The DVD was released alongside A Madea Christmas.

== Plot ==
Anita, a single woman, meets a man online thanks to encouragement from a friend. At first he treats her like a queen, they get married, and things change. Anita then turns into a woman that she never knew she could or would become.

== Shows ==
Scheduled Shows
Date	City	Venue
September 18, 2013	Atlanta	Cobb Energy Performing Arts Centre
September 19, 2013	Atlanta	Cobb Energy Performing Arts Centre
September 20, 2013	Atlanta	Cobb Energy Performing Arts Centre
January 15, 2014	Baton Rouge	River Center
January 16, 2014	Baton Rouge	River Center
January 17, 2014	Houston	Hobby Center
January 18, 2014	Houston	Hobby Center
January 19, 2014	Houston	Hobby Center
January 21, 2014	Lake Charles	Lake Charles Civic Center
January 26, 2014	Wichita	Century II Convention Hall
February 1, 2014	Durham	Durham Performing Arts Center
February 2, 2014	Durham	Durham Performing Arts Center
February 4, 2014	Chattanooga	Memorial Auditorium
February 6, 2014	Charlotte	Ovens Auditorium
February 7, 2014	Greensboro	War Memorial Auditorium
February 8, 2014	Greensboro	War Memorial Auditorium
February 9, 2014	Charlotte	Ovens Auditorium
February 14, 2014	Columbia	Township Auditorium
February 15, 2014	Columbia	Township Auditorium
February 18, 2014	Washington, D.C.	Warner Theatre
February 19, 2014	Washington, D.C.	Warner Theatre
February 20, 2014	Washington, D.C.	Warner Theatre
February 21, 2014	Washington, D.C.	Warner Theatre
February 22, 2014	Washington, D.C.	Warner Theatre
February 23, 2014	Washington, D.C.	Warner Theatre
February 25, 2014	Huntsville	Von Braun Center
February 26, 2014	Columbus	The RiverCenter
February 27, 2014	Fayetteville	Crown Center Theatre
February 28, 2014	Fayetteville	Crown Center Theatre
March 1, 2014	Fayetteville	Crown Center Theatre
March 6, 2014	Memphis	Orpheum Theatre
March 7, 2014	Memphis	Orpheum Theatre
March 8, 2014	Memphis	Orpheum Theatre
March 9, 2014	Memphis	Orpheum Theatre
March 11, 2014	Peoria	Peoria Civic Center
March 12, 2014	Rockford	Coronado Performing Arts Center
March 13, 2014	South Bend	Morris Performing Arts Center
March 14, 2014	Louisville	Louisville Palace
March 15, 2014	Columbus	Palace Theatre
March 16, 2014	Dayton	Schuster Center
March 18, 2014	Pittsburgh	Benedum Center
March 19, 2014	Salisbury	Wicomico Civic Center
March 20, 2014	Baltimore	Lyric Opera House
March 21, 2014	Baltimore	Lyric Opera House
March 22, 2014	Baltimore	Lyric Opera House
March 23, 2014	Baltimore	Lyric Opera House
March 25, 2014	Indianapolis	Murat Theatre
March 26, 2014	Indianapolis	Murat Theatre
March 27, 2014	Cleveland	Palace Theatre
March 28, 2014	Cleveland	Palace Theatre
March 29, 2014	Detroit	Fox Theatre
March 30, 2014	Detroit	Fox Theatre
April 1, 2014	Grand Rapids	DeVos Performance Hall
April 2, 2014	East Lansing	Wharton Center
April 3, 2014	Chicago	Arie Crown Theater
April 4, 2014	Chicago	Arie Crown Theater
April 5, 2014	Chicago	Arie Crown Theater
April 6, 2014	Milwaukee	Milwaukee Theatre
April 8, 2014	Albany	Palace Theatre
April 9, 2014	Rochester	Auditorium Theatre
April 10, 2014	Buffalo	Shea's Performing Arts Center
April 11, 2014	Syracuse	Landmark Theatre
April 12, 2014	Hartford	Bushnell Theatre
April 13, 2014	Hartford	Bushnell Theatre
April 22, 2014	Montgomery	Montgomery Performing Arts Centre
April 23, 2014	Montgomery	Montgomery Performing Arts Centre
April 24, 2014	Mobile	Saenger Theatre
April 25, 2014	Mobile	Saenger Theatre
April 26, 2014	Birmingham	BJCC Concert Hall
April 27, 2014	Birmingham	BJCC Concert Hall
April 30, 2014	Miami	James L. Knight Center
May 1, 2014	Miami	James L. Knight Center
May 2, 2014	Orlando	Bob Carr Performing Arts Centre
May 3, 2014	Jacksonville	Times-Union Center for the Performing Arts
May 4, 2014	Jacksonville	Times-Union Center for the Performing Arts
May 6, 2014	Tallahassee	Tallahassee-Leon County Civic Center
May 7, 2014	Macon	Macon Centreplex
May 8, 2014	Florence	Florence Civic Center
May 10, 2014	Norfolk	Chrysler Hall
May 11, 2014	Norfolk	Chrysler Hall
September 10, 2014	San Jose	City National Civic
September 11, 2014	Oakland	Paramount Theatre
September 12, 2014	Oakland	Paramount Theatre
September 13, 2014	Oakland	Paramount Theatre
September 14, 2014	Oakland	Paramount Theatre
September 17, 2014	Bakersfield	Rabobank Theater and Convention Center
September 18, 2014	Riverside	Fox Performing Arts Center
September 19, 2014	San Diego	San Diego Civic Theatre
September 20, 2014	Los Angeles	The Wiltern
September 21, 2014	Los Angeles	The Wiltern
September 30, 2014	Philadelphia	Merriam Theater
October 1, 2014	Philadelphia	Merriam Theater
October 2, 2014	Philadelphia	Merriam Theater
October 3, 2014	Philadelphia	Merriam Theater
October 4, 2014	Philadelphia	Merriam Theater
October 5, 2014	Philadelphia	Merriam Theater
October 7, 2014	Newark	New Jersey Performing Arts Center
October 8, 2014	Newark	New Jersey Performing Arts Center
October 9, 2014	New York	Beacon Theatre
October 10, 2014	New York	Beacon Theatre
October 11, 2014	New York	Beacon Theatre
October 12, 2014	New York	Beacon Theatre

== Cast ==
- Cheryl Pepsii Riley as Anita
- Patrice Lovely as Mama Hattie
- Monica Blaire as Jasmine
- Muhammad Ayers as Randy
- Zebulon Ellis as Reverend Walker
- Candice Pye as Mona
- Ray Lavender as Victor
- Olrick Johnson as Detective Larry

== The Band ==
- Ronnie Garrett - Musical Director / Bass Guitar
- Jelani Jackson - Bass
- Derek Scott - Guitar
- Marcus Williams - Drums
- Michael Burton - Saxophone
- Natalie Ragins - Keyboards / Organs
- Vance Taylor - Keyboards
- Aaron Draper - Percussion
- Wilburt Williams - Trombone
- Melvin Jones - Trumpet
- Sheryl Boyd - Background Vocals
- Lindsay Fields - Background Vocals
- Greg Kirkland - Background Vocals

== Musical Numbers ==
All songs written and/or produced by Tyler Perry and Elvin D. Ross.

- "To God Be The Glory" - Anita
- "I'm Glad I Found You" - Mona and Victor
- "Get Up Get Out" - Jasmine
- "Just Let Go" - Randy
- "Hell Hath No Fury Like A Woman Scorned" - Mama Hattie
- "God Cares For You" - Reverend Walker
- "Enough Is Enough" - Anita
