= Madea Gets a Job =

2012 American stage play

- Original language: English
- Written by: Tyler Perry
- Characters: Madea, Hattie, Carson, Sam, Malik, Rebecca, Sue Ellen, Mrs. Watson, Dalia, Barbara, Carla and Allen
- Genre: Comedy-Drama
- Setting: Easy Rest Retirement Home

Premiere
- Date: March 15, 2012
- Place: Memphis

Madea Gets a Job is a 2012 American stage play created, written, produced, and directed by Tyler Perry. It stars Tyler Perry as Madea "Mabel" Simmons and Patrice Lovely as Hattie. The live performance released on DVD on February 5, 2013 was recorded live in Atlanta at the Cobb Energy Performing Arts Centre in June 2012.

== Plot ==
Hard times (and the judge) caught up with Madea and she is forced to come out of retirement to go to work. This creates a problem since Madea is still on probation and therefore is not a star candidate for employment. Madea is forced to do community service work and chooses to acquire a job at a nursing home which would change her employers life forever. The comically outspoken Madea gives counseling and advice to nursing home residents, staff, and family which positively improves their outlook and personal relationships.

== Tour Dates ==
Scheduled Shows
Date	City	Venue
March 15, 2012	Memphis	Orpheum Theatre
March 17, 2012	Memphis	Orpheum Theatre
March 18, 2012	Memphis	Orpheum Theatre
March 22, 2012	Chicago	Arie Crown Theater
March 23, 2012	Chicago	Arie Crown Theater
March 24, 2012	Chicago	Arie Crown Theater
March 25, 2012	Chicago	Arie Crown Theater
March 29, 2012	Charleston	North Charleston Coliseum
March 30, 2012	Birmingham	BJCC Concert Hall
March 31, 2012	Birmingham	BJCC Concert Hall
April 1, 2012	Birmingham	BJCC Concert Hall
April 5, 2012	Roanoke	Roanoke Civic Center
April 6, 2012	Washington, D.C.	Verizon Center
April 7, 2012	Washington, D.C.	Verizon Center
April 8, 2012	Richmond	Richmond Coliseum
April 12, 2012	Atlanta	Fabulous Fox Theatre
April 13, 2012	Atlanta	Fabulous Fox Theatre
April 14, 2012	Atlanta	Fabulous Fox Theatre
April 15, 2012	Atlanta	Fabulous Fox Theatre
April 19, 2012	San Diego	San Diego Sports Arena
April 20, 2012	Los Angeles	Nokia Theatre L.A. Live
April 21, 2012	Los Angeles	Nokia Theatre L.A. Live
April 22, 2012	Los Angeles	Nokia Theatre L.A. Live
April 26, 2012	Detroit	Fox Theatre
April 27, 2012	Detroit	Fox Theatre
April 28, 2012	Detroit	Fox Theatre
April 29, 2012	Detroit	Fox Theatre
May 3, 2012	Baltimore	1st Mariner Arena
May 4, 2012	Baltimore	1st Mariner Arena
May 5, 2012	Hartford	XL Center
May 6, 2012	Bridgeport	Webster Bank Arena
May 10, 2012	Grand Prairie	Verizon Theatre at Grand Prairie
May 11, 2012	Grand Prairie	Verizon Theatre at Grand Prairie
May 12, 2012	Grand Prairie	Verizon Theatre at Grand Prairie
May 13, 2012	Grand Prairie	Verizon Theatre at Grand Prairie
May 17, 2012	Buffalo	First Niagara Center
May 18, 2012	Philadelphia	Liacouras Center
May 19, 2012	Philadelphia	Liacouras Center
May 20, 2012	Philadelphia	Liacouras Center
May 24, 2012	Chicago	Arie Crown Theater
May 25, 2012	Chicago	Arie Crown Theater
May 26, 2012	Chicago	Arie Crown Theater
May 27, 2012	Chicago	Arie Crown Theater
June 6, 2012	Atlanta	Cobb Energy Performing Arts Centre
June 7, 2012	Atlanta	Cobb Energy Performing Arts Centre

Cancellations and rescheduled shows

Date	City	Venue
September 20, 2012	Columbus	Columbus Civic Center
September 21, 2012	Albany	Albany Civic Center
September 22, 2012	Greensboro	Greensboro Coliseum Complex
September 23, 2012	Macon	Macon Civic CentroPlex
September 27, 2012	New Orleans	New Orleans Arena
September 28, 2012	Mobile	Mobile Civic Center
September 29, 2012	Mobile	Mobile Civic Center
September 30, 2012	Little Rock	Verizon Arena
October 11, 2012	Greenville	Bi-Lo Center
October 12, 2012	Columbia	Colonial Life Arena
October 13, 2012	Columbia	Colonial Life Arena
October 14, 2012	Fayetteville	Crown Center
October 20, 2012	Raleigh	PNC Arena
October 21, 2012	Augusta	James Brown Arena
October 25, 2012	Seattle	Key Arena
October 26, 2012	Las Vegas	Aladdin Theatre for the Performing Arts
October 27, 2012	Oakland	Oakland Coliseum
October 28, 2012	Oakland	Oakland Coliseum
November 1, 2012	Charlotte	Time Warner Arena
November 3, 2012	Jacksonville	Veteran's Memorial Arena
November 4, 2012	Savannah	Savannah Civic Center
November 8, 2012	Orlando	Amway Arena
November 9, 2012	Miami	American Airlines Arena
November 10, 2012	Miami	American Airlines Arena
November 11, 2012	Tampa	Sundome
November 15, 2012	Cleveland	Wolstein Arena
November 16, 2012	New York	Madison Square Garden
November 17, 2012	New York	Madison Square Garden
November 18, 2012	Milwaukee	U.S. Cellular Arena

== Cast ==
- Tyler Perry as Madea
- Patrice Lovely as Hattie
- Cheryl "Pepsii" Riley as Carla Montgomery
- Chandra Currelley-Young as Barbara
- Melonie Daniels-Walker as Mrs. Watson
- Tony Grant as Allen
- Tamar Davis as Dalia
- Tony Hightower as Malik
- Maurice Lauchner as Carson
- Jeffery Lewis as Sam
- Stephanie Ferrett as Sue Ellen
- Alexis Jones as Rebecca

== The Band ==
- Ronnie Garrett - Musical Director/Bass Guitar
- Derek Scott - Guitar
- Marcus Williams - Drums
- Michael Burton - Saxophone
- Justin Gilbert - Keyboards
- Darius Fentress - Percussion
- Natalie Ragins - Keyboards
- Melvin Jones - Trumpet
- Saunders Sermons - Trombone
- Greg Kirkland - Background Vocals
- Zuri Craig - Background Vocals
- Latayvia Cherry - Background Vocals

== Musical numbers ==
All songs written and/or produced by Tyler Perry and Elvin D. Ross.

- "Grandma's Hands" – Entire Cast
- "Unbelievable" – Malik and Dalia
- "All I Want Is Love" – Carla
- "They Just Left Me" – Barbara and Carson
- "Where Did The Time Go" – Hattie
- "Run to Me" – Allen
- "Please Don't Pass Me By" – Entire Cast

=== Post-Show Concert ===
- "Before I Let Go" - Tony Grant
- "Cry Together" - Tony Hightower
- 'He Loves Me" - Tamar Davis
- "Dr. Feelgood" - Cheryl Pepsii Riley
- "Something He Can Feel" - Patrice Lovely
- "Me, Myself and I" - Alexis Jones
- "Can You Stand the Rain" - Tyler Perry
- "What Have You Done for Me Lately" - Melonie Daniels-Walker
- "How Can I Ease the Pain" - Stephanie Ferrett
- "Reasons" - Jeffery Lewis
- "Let It Be" - Maurice Lauchner and Chandra Currelley-Young
