= Dean Gardens =

Prominent house in USA

Coordinates: 34°00′22″N 84°12′39″W

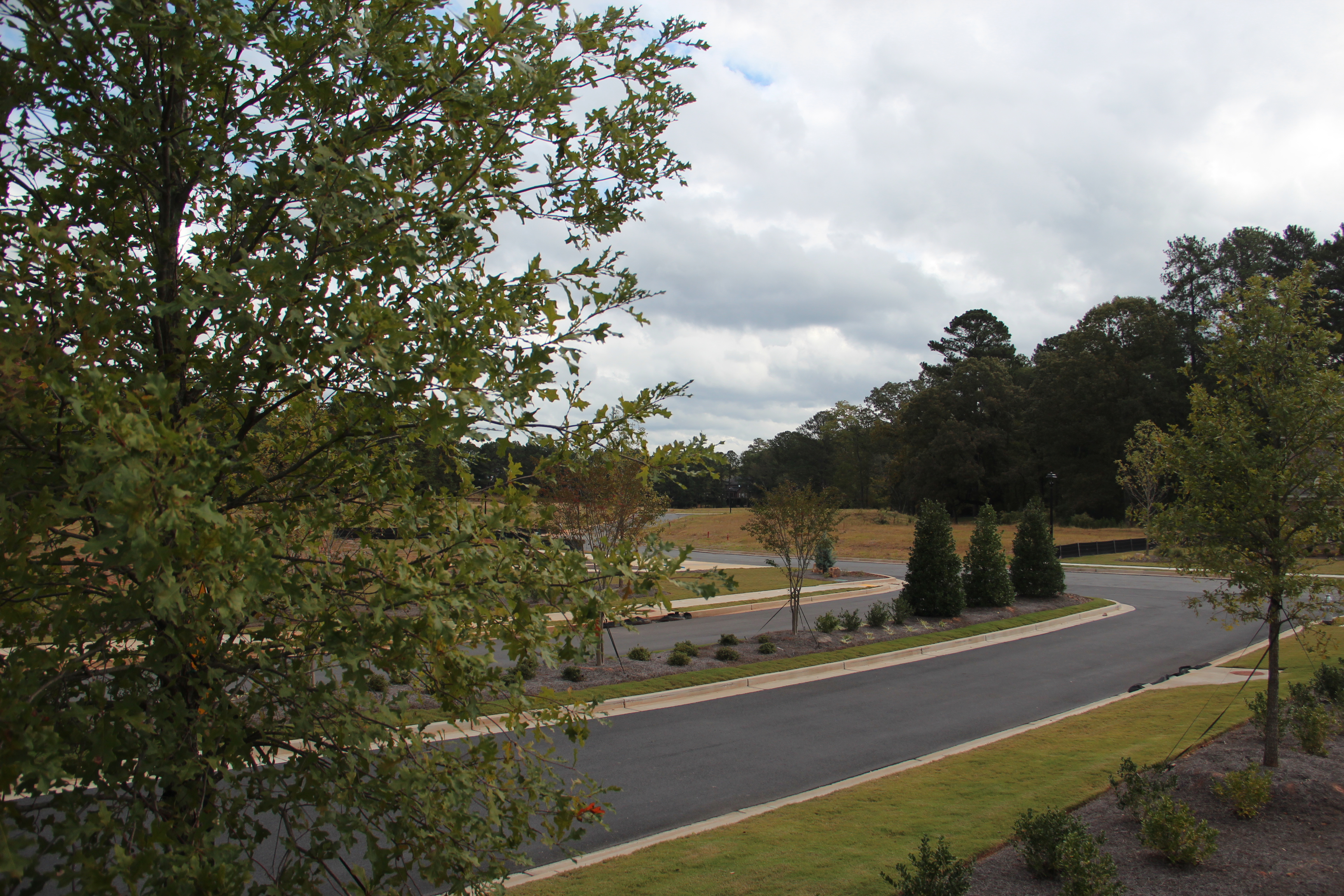
Lennar subdivision construction halted at the former location of Dean Gardens, 2017

Dean Gardens was one of the largest homes in metropolitan Atlanta, Georgia. At the time of its completion in 1992, the 32,000 square foot, 15 bedroom house was the largest in Atlanta. The former owner, Larry Dean, who made his fortune in software, spent $30 million on its construction, plus $1.5 million a year on its upkeep.

The 58-acre property then became a boondoggle of failed construction efforts, wasted resources and a chain of owners.

== History ==
The house was first put up for sale in 1994, two years after its completion. Since that time, it attracted media notoriety for having gone unsold for 17 years. Reasons why it never sold include its so-called, "Liberace-meets-Napoleon design," which include pink themes, a Moroccan theater, 24-karat-gold sinks, a Hawaiian-art gallery, a 1950s-style dance hall, French Empire-style furniture, 13 fireplaces and a 24-seat dining room with a wall-sized aquarium called, the "Predator Tank."

Dean Gardens was sold in 2010 to Tyler Perry, the Atlanta-based entertainment mogul, for $7.6 million, down from its original asking price of $40 million. Perry demolished the home to build a more energy-efficient and sustainable residence. However he failed to build anything and sold the land for $9.2 million to Lennar. Lennar planned on building 70 homes, but due to land erosion and restrictions about building too close to the river, much of the land was unbuildable. Because it was not enough homes to turn a profit, Lennar canceled construction in February 2017, but not before streets and other landscape features had been built at a cost of nearly $13 million. In 2017, the property was for sale by Lennar, with 61 empty lots and 3 completed homes. The property was later developed in 2018 and 2019 into the Bayard gated subdivision with 64 total single family homes.
