= The Resort (film) =

2021 horror film by Taylor Chien

- Theatrical release poster
- Directed by: Taylor Chien
- Written by: Taylor Chien
- Produced by: Will Meldman; Sam Mobley; Justin Chien; Taylor Chien; Quavious Marshall
- Starring: Bianca Haase; Brock O'Hurn; Michael Vlamis; Michelle Randolph
- Cinematography: Adriaan Kirchner
- Edited by: Joe Homokay
- Music by: John "Fingazz" Stary
- Production companies: Double Down Pictures; Moonbase
- Distributed by: Vertical Entertainment
- Release date: April 30, 2021
- Running time: 75 minutes
- Country: United States
- Language: English
- Box office: $191,996

The Resort is a 2021 American horror film written and directed by Taylor Chien. It stars Bianca Haase, Brock O'Hurn, Michael Vlamis, and Michelle Randolph. The movie was shot in 2019, and hip-hop artist Quavo helped produce it after being encouraged by main producer Will Meldman.

The film focuses on four friends who head to Hawaii to investigate reports of a haunting at an abandoned resort in hopes of finding the infamous "Half-Faced Girl."

== Plot ==
Lex, a writer who studies horror fiction, and her three friends travel to a Hawaiian island to investigate reports of a haunting at an abandoned hotel resort. The group starts joking and playing in a scenic waterfall, but it quickly turns into a night of horror when they can't find the way they came, their flashlights are dying, and the Half-Face Girl from the ghost stories about the resort begins coming after them.

Bree is the first death, when a security car locks everyone but her out of it, the engine starts on its own and drives her off the resort balcony. After Chris confirms Bree's state, the three exit and escape the Half-Face Girl. Sam is then possessed, causing concern from the rest of the group. He tries to strangle Chris, only for Lex to stab him in the neck with scissors. Due to his new nature, he doesn't quite die, and the Half-Face Girl rips off Sam's face. The Half-Face Girl then stalks after Lex and Chris, who attempt to exit in an elevator. Chris sacrifices himself so Lex can get up the elevator as the Half-Face Girl tries to climb up and reach her.

Upon exiting, Lex finds Bree, who is badly injured and blinded from the crash. Seemingly possessed, Bree sings happy birthday to Lex before igniting a flame beneath herself. Lex narrates this from a hospital bed to a skeptical detective, unsure how to take all she says, especially since the photos she took aren't on her phone anymore. Lex claims that it's also hard to watch all your friends die to something so unbelievable. When the detective gets up to make a call to his station, under the guise of scouring the island to help find whoever caused the deaths of her friends, Lex starts fooling with her camera. After taking a picture of the detective, she notices that he has similar veins to those of the possessed, and lowers her phone. The place around her crumbles, revealing she's still back at the resort. She never left.

== Cast ==
- Bianca Haase as Lex
- Brock O'Hurn as Chris
- Michael Vlamis as Sam
- Michelle Randolph as Bree
- Dave Sheridan as Detective
- Dante Jimenez as Mike
- Romualdo Castillo as Henry
- Andy Bumatai as Helicopter Pilot
- Rebecca Jarvis as Jessica
- Avery Pascual as Sarah
- Casey Dacanay as Mrs. Kendall
- Joaquin Veizaga as Preston
- Danika Massey as Paranormal P.I. Host
- Brandon B. Graham as The Haunting of Kilahuna Narrator

== Release ==
The film received a limited release in the United States on April 30, 2021, by Vertical Entertainment.

== Reception ==
On the review aggregator website Rotten Tomatoes, 37% of 19 critics' reviews are positive, with an average rating of 3.70/10.

Robert Kojder of Flickering Myth gave the film a rating of 1 over 5 and he wrote: This is a cheaply made ghost story that barely features anything haunting, leisurely taking its time for anything to happen. Jenny Nulf of The Austin Chronicle gave the film a negative review and a rating of 1 over 5 and wrote: The direction for the actors is aimless, scattered, and hollow. They mouth inaudible things to each other while another character is talking, distract when they are supposed to be in the background, and lack any sort of chemistry.

Martin Unsworth of Starburst gave the film a 3 out of 5 rating and he said: There's still enough to recommend as when things kick off, there's one particularly good gore effect, and the uninhabited location adds an eerie atmosphere, but those wanting something a little more intense will be left lacking. Leslie Felperin of The Guardian also gave the film a 1 over 5 rating and she wrote: This inane horror movie is so ludicrously cliche-ridden one starts to wonder if it's not some kind of sophisticated meta-joke being played on us.

Dallas King of Outtake Magazine also gave the film a negative review, a 2 out of 5 rating and wrote: The Resort offers a fright-filled mini-break, but ultimately fails to deliver a truly memorable time. Do not expect a glowing review on TripAdvisor! John Serba of Decider also gave the film a negative review and wrote: Save for a couple instances of ooey-gooey practical makeup FX, the film fails on every level.
