= Rock Steady Row =

- Directed by: Trevor Stevens
- Written by: Bomani J. Story
- Produced by: Jade Allen; Madeleine Krikava; Gia Rigoli; Cody Zwieg
- Starring: Diamond White; Logan Huffman; Larry Miller
- Cinematography: Nico Aguilar
- Edited by: Jordan Allen
- Music by: Joshua R. Mosley
- Production companies: Gunpowder & Sky; King Bandit Films
- Release date: January 2018 (Slamdance)
- Running time: 77 minutes
- Country: United States
- Language: English

Rock Steady Row is a 2018 American drama film directed by Trevor Stevens and featuring Diamond White, Logan Huffman and Larry Miller. It is Stevens' feature directorial debut.

== Cast ==
- Isaac Alisma
- Jordan Allen
- Marcus Blake
- Heston Horwin
- Diamond White
- Logan Huffman
- Allie Marie Evans
- Larry Miller
- Peter Gilroy

== Release ==
The film premiered at the Slamdance Film Festival in January 2018.

== Reception ==
The film has an 88% rating on Rotten Tomatoes. Theo Schear of Film Threat gave the film a 3 out of 10.

Tom Kiesecoms of Screen Anarchy gave the film a positive review and wrote that the film "is a fast-paced blast of creativity that thrills as it exposes the oppression that is endemic to the college system as a whole and challenges the objectification that fraternities can foster."

Justin Lowe of The Hollywood Reporter also gave the film a positive review and wrote, "...Trevor Stevens’ stylish first feature should strike a chord with youthful audiences and genre enthusiasts alike."

== Accolades ==
The film won the Narrative Feature Grand Jury Prize and the Audience Award for Best Narrative Feature at the Slamdance Film Festival.
