= Boo! A Madea Halloween =

2016 film by Tyler Perry

- Theatrical release poster
- Directed by: Tyler Perry
- Written by: Tyler Perry
- Produced by: Tyler Perry; Ozzie Areu; Will Areu
- Starring: Tyler Perry; Cassi Davis; Patrice Lovely; Yousef Erakat; Lexy Panterra; Andre Hall; Liza Koshy; Diamond White; Brock O'Hurn; Bella Thorne
- Cinematography: Richard Vialet
- Edited by: Larry Sexton
- Music by: Elvin Ross
- Production company: Tyler Perry Studios
- Distributed by: Lionsgate
- Release date: October 21, 2016
- Running time: 103 minutes
- Country: United States
- Language: English
- Budget: $20 million
- Box office: $74.8 million

Boo! A Madea Halloween is a 2016 American comedy horror film directed, written, starring and co-produced by Tyler Perry. The idea for the film originated from a fictitious Madea Halloween movie that was mentioned in Chris Rock's 2014 film Top Five. It is the eighth film in the Madea series and the second to not be adapted from a stage play (the first being Madea's Witness Protection) as it tells the story of Madea being enlisted by her nephew Brian to watch over his daughter Tiffany as she deals with different horrors and a frat party around the corner. The film stars Perry, Cassi Davis, Patrice Lovely, Yousef Erakat, Lexy Panterra, Andre Hall, Liza Koshy, Diamond White, Brock O'Hurn, and Bella Thorne.

The film was released by Lionsgate on October 21, 2016, and grossed $74.8 million.

A sequel titled Boo 2! A Madea Halloween was released the following year on October 20, 2017.

== Plot ==
Jonathan and his fraternity brothers invite teenager Tiffany Simmons and her high school friends Rain Mathison, Leah Devereaux, and a reluctant Aday Walker to a Halloween party. Tiffany's father Brian forbids her to attend and is later aghast at her smutty video chat with Jonathan. That night, Madea and Aunt Bam distribute candy to trick-or-treaters, though Bam steals candy back from them. Joe dresses as a clown to frighten the women, with their friend Hattie Mae Love as his accomplice. Brian arranges for Madea (who brings along Joe, Aunt Bam, and Hattie) to stay at his house to prevent Tiffany from attending the party while he works late and takes his son Brian Jr. (B.J.) to his ex-wife's house, but his reluctance to put his foot down and be firm with his daughter appalls the four elders. To keep the oldsters busy so they can sneak out, Tiffany and the still-reluctant Aday invent a ghost story that leads the superstitious adults to hide in the bedrooms.

Upon overcoming the superstition to check Tiffany's bed, Madea realizes that the girls are at the party, so she crashes it to look for Tiffany, but gets ejected along with Bam and Hattie after shutting the party down by turning off the music. Upon returning home, the women then put a permanent end to the party by calling the police on the frathouse. Aday overhears the brothers planning revenge against Madea and her friends. The boys pose as the ghost from Tiffany's story, hacking into the house's wiring and plumbing, and sneaking into the attic; Madea, Bam, and Hattie flee the house, pursued by the brothers and partygoers dressed as zombies. Joe stays at the house and knocks out a frat boy dressed as a deranged clown, who reveals Jonathan's scheme to Joe.

Madea runs into a church where Aday's parents are ministers; Madea comes to believe the supernatural threats are punishment for her sins and hopes salvation will protect her. Aday and her parents then reveal Jonathan's scheme, with the former adding that it was payback against the women for shutting the party down; Aday, Madea, Hattie and Bam plan a comeuppance for the fraternity. They return to Brian's house and force him to return home to deal with Tiffany's misbehavior, but he continues to be reluctant to take any real action, not wanting to use the old-school methods that his father and aunt used on him. Finally fed up, Madea, Bam, and Hattie storm up to Tiffany's room to confront her, pack her things to throw her out of the house, and even take some things for themselves. Tiffany looks to her father for help, but when he refuses, she finally calls him out for being such a pushover with everyone and reveals her knowledge of her mother cheating on him in their house, as well as that she knew that he knew about her mother's infidelity and she was appalled when he didn't confront her; this made her lose respect for her father.

At this, Brian finally toughens up and helps the women pack up Tiffany's things. He then confirms to Tiffany that he knew about the affair, but took no action and walked away to protect Tiffany and her brother from all the drama and pain. Brian explains that he makes the rules and decisions that he does to protect his children so they can live their lives and make mistakes responsibly. He then issues Tiffany the ultimatum of either living there with him and abiding by his rules or packing up and going out into the streets on her own. Finally getting the message of what being an adult is truly about, Tiffany apologizes to her father and the women for her behavior and agrees to live by her father's rules. Then the police arrive to reveal that Aday has gone missing and arrest Tiffany in connection with her disappearance.

The next day, the police go to the frat house; scrambling to figure out what to do, the brothers discover Aday's seemingly-murdered corpse in the basement. The officers arrest the boys along with Tiffany, Rain, and Leah for Aday's murder when they find the corpse; they also arrest Rain, Leah, and the boys for bringing the underage Tiffany and Aday to the party. They load everyone onto a prison bus with other prisoners and a brawl breaks out on the bus. The boys and girls (sans Tiffany) panic until Aday appears, alive and unharmed; the arrests were a prank to punish everyone's misbehavior. The boys and girls apologize to the women and Aday for everything they caused. Brian, a federal prosecutor, reveals that the police officers are real, not actors as Madea had thought. The police find marijuana in the frat house and an officer recognizes Madea. She, Joe, and the brothers flee as the film ends.

== Cast ==
- Tyler Perry as:
  - Mabel "Madea" Simmons
  - Joe Simmons, Madea's brother
  - Brian Simmons, a lawyer and son of Joe and the nephew of Madea
- Cassi Davis as Aunt Bam, Madea's cousin
- Patrice Lovely as Hattie, a friend of Madea and Bam
- Bella Thorne as Rain, a friend of Tiffany
- Yousef Erakat as Jonathan, the leader of the Upsilon Theta fraternity
- Lexy Panterra as Leah, a friend of Tiffany
- Andre Hall as Quinton, a frat brother
- Brock O'Hurn as Horse, a frat brother
- Liza Koshy as Aday, a friend of Tiffany
- Diamond White as Tiffany Simmons, Brian and Debrah's daughter
- Kian Lawley as Bean Boy
- JC Caylen as Mikey
- Jimmy Tatro as Sean
- Tyga as himself
- Dominique Witten as Police Officer #3
- Lavell Crawford as Prisoner #1
- Corey Holcomb as Prisoner #2

== Production ==
In 2015, Perry purchased 330 acres of Fort McPherson in Atlanta which became new home of Tyler Perry Studios. Principal photography took place on the army grounds from January 4 to April 8, 2016. Perry turned the soldiers living quarters into sets for the film.

== Reception ==
=== Box office ===
Boo! A Madea Halloween grossed $73.2 million in North America and $1.6 million in other territories for a worldwide total of $74.8 million against a $20 million budget. The film was released on October 21, 2016, alongside Ouija: Origin of Evil, Keeping Up with the Joneses and Jack Reacher: Never Go Back and was expected to gross $15–17 million from 2,260 theaters in its opening weekend. The film grossed $9.4 million on its first day (including $855,000 from Thursday night previews) and an above-expected $27.6 million in its opening weekend, finishing first at the box office and ranking as the fourth-best debut for a Perry film. In its second weekend, the film grossed $17.2 million (a drop of only 39.6%) and, despite facing competition with the newcomer Inferno ($14.9 million), remained first at the box office.

=== Critical response ===
On review aggregation website Rotten Tomatoes, the film has an approval rating of 19% based on 42 reviews, with an average rating of 3.88/10. The site's critical consensus reads, "Boo! A Madea Halloween won't win Tyler Perry's long-running franchise many new converts, but at nine films and counting, it hardly needs to." On Metacritic, which assigns a normalized rating, the film has a score of 30/100, based on reviews from 14 critics, indicating "generally unfavorable" reviews. Audiences polled by CinemaScore gave the film an average grade of "A" on an A+ to F scale.

=== Accolades ===
Award	Category	Subject	Result
Golden Raspberry Awards (37th)	Worst Actress	Tyler Perry	Nominated
Golden Raspberry Awards (37th)	Worst Director	Tyler Perry	Nominated
Golden Raspberry Awards (37th)	Worst Screen Combo	Tyler Perry	Nominated
Golden Raspberry Awards (37th)	Worst Screen Combo	That same old worn out wig	Nominated

== Sequel ==
In May 2017, Lionsgate announced that a sequel titled Boo 2! A Madea Halloween would be released on October 20, 2017.

== See also ==
- List of films set around Halloween
