= Boo 2! A Madea Halloween =

2017 film by Tyler Perry

- Theatrical release poster
- Directed by: Tyler Perry
- Written by: Tyler Perry
- Produced by: Tyler Perry; Ozzie Areu; Will Areu; Mark E. Swinton
- Starring: Tyler Perry; Cassi Davis; Patrice Lovely; Yousef Erakat; Diamond White; Lexy Panterra; Andre Hall; Brock O'Hurn; Tito Ortiz
- Cinematography: Richard Vialet
- Edited by: Larry Sexton
- Music by: Christopher Lennertz; Phillip White
- Production company: Tyler Perry Studios
- Distributed by: Lionsgate
- Release date: October 20, 2017
- Running time: 101 minutes
- Country: United States
- Language: English
- Budget: $20–25 million
- Box office: $48.3 million

Boo 2! A Madea Halloween (Note: (stylized in marketing as Boo! Two: A Madea Halloween)) is a 2017 American comedy horror film written, produced, directed by and starring Tyler Perry and also starring Cassi Davis, Patrice Lovely, Yousef Erakat, Diamond White, Lexy Panterra, Andre Hall, Brock O'Hurn, and Tito Ortiz. It is the tenth film in the Madea film series, the sequel to Boo! A Madea Halloween (2016), and the third Madea film (after Madea's Witness Protection and Boo!) not adapted from a stage play as it tells the story of Madea going to retrieve a now 18-year-old Tiffany from a lake that is said to be stalked by a serial killer. The film was released by Lionsgate on October 20, 2017, and grossed $48 million.

== Plot ==
After school on Tiffany's 18th birthday, Tiffany (Diamond White) and her friend Gabriella (Inanna Sarkis) encounter Tiffany's dad Brian (Tyler Perry) and brother B.J. (Dee Dubois) outside the school. Tiffany's mom, Brian's ex-wife Debrah (Taja V. Simpson) arrives with her new husband Calvin (Akende Munalula) and they surprise Tiffany with the car she wanted (and hoped her father would give her). She and Gabriella drive it recklessly to the Upsilon Theta frat house where they hear that Jonathan (Yousef Erakat) and the others are having a Halloween party at Lake Derrick. She hopes to make it up to them after what happened last year.

Brian goes home where Madea, Joe, Bam (Cassi Davis), and Hattie (Patrice Lovely) are waiting at his house to surprise Tiffany with Gabriella's dad Victor (Tito Ortiz). She tells her friend Leah (Lexy Panterra) about the party and asks her mom if she can go. She says yes to upset Brian. Madea overhears Tiffany's conversation about the party and immediately tells Brian, but he agrees to let her go so that he can teach her a lesson. Unhappy about Brian's decision, Madea decides to go to Lake Derrick with Joe, Bam, and Hattie to get Tiffany, who rounds up Gabriella, Leah, and Anna (Hannah Stocking), a girl who's stalking Horse (Brock O'Hurn), and they arrive at Lake Derrick in her new car. The frat boys meet up and have fun with the girls until some of them disappear after seeing "Derrick", his brother, and his daughters.

On the way, Madea accidentally hits one of "Derrick's" daughters with her car when she mysteriously appears on the road. Madea, Bam, and Hattie check on the girl, who pulls her hair and shows her scarred-up face to everybody. The ladies run back to the car, but the girl appears on top of the car, scaring everyone again, and Joe immediately drives away.

Back at Lake Derrick, Tiffany, Gabriella, Leah, and the remaining frat boys are at the campfire discussing the murders that happened in the area at the hands of "Derrick". Gabriella doesn't want to hear this and insists on leaving. Horse and Leah sneak away to have sex, under the guise that they will look for ice for the cooler. While on the truck, the two find blood and are immediately confronted by "Derrick" and his family. "Derrick" and his family chase them into the woods with Horse getting caught and presumably killed. Leah runs out of the forest and sees Madea and the gang, deciding to wait with them for the car to stop smoking, until Bam sees a "Grim Reaper" figure standing in the middle of the road. Madea initially thinks this is just another one of the frat boys' pranks until the figure slashes one of the Cadillac's tires, but Joe continues to drive it anyway.

Gabriella reluctantly seeks safety in a tent with Dino (Mike Tornabene), a frat brother who had been flirting with her all night, but they discover "Derrick" and his daughters outside the tent. In another tent, Tiffany hooks up with Jonathan until "Derrick" tears down the tent. Tiffany, Gabriella, Jonathan, and Dino escape from the camp after Tiffany tries unsuccessfully to call her mom.

Madea and the crew finally arrive at the camp. Madea accompanies Hattie to an old outhouse to go to the bathroom. While waiting, Madea spots a masked, axe-wielding killer coming out of the river and immediately runs away. Inside the outhouse, Hattie spots the girl trying to grab her and she runs away. Madea and Hattie arrive back at the car, but Joe spots "Derrick" and drives away.

At the DeShields County Sheriff Department, Debrah and Calvin desperately ask the sheriff (Barry Stoltze) to check for Tiffany at Lake Derrick, but Brian says he will go look for her with Victor.

Madea's car stops in front of an old abandoned house, where the girl scares everyone out of the car into the house. They find Tiffany, Leah, Gabriella, Jonathan, and Dino hiding there. Inside, Hattie and Madea witness Joe being dragged away by "Derrick" and his brother. Then "Derrick" saws off Madea's car. The girl appears inside, scaring everyone out. Brian and Victor are waiting for them where they reveal that they had been pranking them for lying and sneaking out where the twin acrobats at Tiffany's birthday party posing as the girl.

At the DeShields County Sheriff Department, Debrah learns of Brian and Victor's prank where she is learning to co-parent. Debrah agrees and the people who were "killed" are safely locked at the sheriff department for trespassing and having drugs. While Victor plans to have his revenge on Horse for hitting on Gabriella and Anna was also involved in Brian's prank, Madea ducks out of sight as she mentions to Bam that there is a wanted poster of her on the wall.

Outside the sheriff department, Brian and Victor realize that the masked chainsaw killer at the outhouse was not part of the prank....he is the actual Derrick. When Derrick spots them, they drive away. A still-alive Joe asks him if he can help him deal with his problem with Madea and he nods in response.

== Cast ==
- Tyler Perry as:
  - Mabel "Madea" Simmons, a tough old lady.
  - Joe Simmons, the brother of Madea.
  - Brian Simmons, a lawyer who is the son of Joe and the nephew of Madea.
- Cassi Davis as Aunt Bam, the cousin of Madea.
- Patrice Lovely as Hattie Mae Love, a friend of Madea and Bam.
- Yousef Erakat as Jonathan, the leader of the Upsilon Theta fraternity.
- Diamond White as Tiffany Simmons, the daughter of Brian and Debrah.
- Lexy Panterra as Leah Devereaux, a friend of Tiffany.
- Andre Hall as Quinton, a frat brother.
- Brock O'Hurn as Ronaldo "Horse", a frat brother.
- Tito Ortiz as Victor, Gabriella's dad.
- Taja V. Simpson as Debrah Simmons, the ex-wife of Brian. She was previously portrayed by Tamara Taylor in Diary of a Mad Black Woman.
- Inanna Sarkis as Gabriella, a friend of Tiffany.
- Hannah Stocking as Anna, a friend of Tiffany who stalks Horse.
- Alex Burriss as Allen, a frat boy
- Lauren Riihimaki as Lisa
- Jared Sawyer Jr. as a Geeky College Student
- Mike Tornabene as Dino, a frat brother.
- Akende Munalula as Calvin, Debrah's current husband.
- De'arra Taylor as Deidre
- Ken Walker as Kevin
- Elizabeth Hinkler as Renee, an acrobat hired by Brian to perform at Tiffany's birthday party.
- Emily Hinkler as Rose, an acrobat and Renee's twin sister hired by Brian to perform at Tiffany's birthday party.
- Barry Stoltze as the unnamed Sheriff of DeShields County
- Bradley Martyn as Byron, a frat brother.
- Dee Dubois as Brian "B.J." Simmons Jr., the son of Brian and Debrah.
- Aden Stay as:
  - Mr. Wilson
  - Reaper
  - Derrick #1
  - Chainsaw Man #1
- Yan Dron as:
  - Derrick #2
  - Chainsaw Man #2
  - Man with Axe
- Rae Sremmurd as Themselves

== Production ==
Principal photography on Boo 2! A Madea Halloween began in March 2017 in Atlanta, Georgia. The budget was around 25 million dollars. Lionsgate released a teaser trailer for the film on July 18, 2017, and a full trailer on August 18.

== Release ==
The film was theatrically released on October 20, 2017, by Lionsgate. It was released on DVD and Blu-ray on January 30, 2018.

== Reception ==
=== Box office ===
Boo 2! A Madea Halloween grossed $47.3 million in the United States and Canada, and $1 million in other territories, for a worldwide total of $48.3 million, against a production budget of $25 million.

In the United States and Canada, Boo 2! A Madea Halloween was released alongside Geostorm, The Snowman and Only The Brave, and was expected to gross $20–25 million from 2,388 theaters in its opening weekend. The film made $760,000 from Thursday night previews and $7.5 million on its first day. It went on to open to $21.7 million (down 24% from the first film's $27.6 million debut), becoming the tenth Tyler Perry film to finish first at the box office. Like most Perry films, the opening weekend audience demographics were diverse: 38% African-American, 31% Caucasian and 21% Hispanic. In its second weekend, the film dropped 52% to $10.1 million (more than the 39.6% drop of the first film), finishing second, behind newcomer Jigsaw ($16.6 million), and in its third weekend the film grossed $4.7 million (dropping another 53%), finishing 4th at the box office.

=== Critical response ===
On the review aggregator website Rotten Tomatoes, 5% of 22 critics' reviews are positive, with an average rating of 2.4/10. The website's consensus reads: "Tyler Perry's Boo 2! A Madea Halloween is an affront to comedy — and the audience." Metacritic, which uses a weighted average, assigned the film a score of 17 out of 100, based on 10 critics, indicating "overwhelming dislike". Audiences polled by CinemaScore gave the film an average grade of "A−" on an A+ to F scale, while PostTrak reported filmgoers gave it a 73% overall positive score.

=== Accolades ===
Award	Category	Subject	Result
Golden Raspberry Awards	Worst Actress	Tyler Perry	Won
Golden Raspberry Awards	Worst Screen Combo	Tyler Perry	Nominated
Golden Raspberry Awards	Worst Screen Combo	Either the ratty old dress or worn-out wig	Nominated
Golden Raspberry Awards	Worst Prequel, Remake, Rip-off or Sequel		Nominated

== See also ==
- List of films set around Halloween
