= Madea's Family Reunion =

- Theatrical release poster
- Directed by: Tyler Perry
- Written by: Tyler Perry
- Based on: Madea's Family Reunion by Tyler Perry
- Produced by: Tyler Perry; Reuben Cannon
- Starring: Tyler Perry; Blair Underwood; Lynn Whitfield; Boris Kodjoe; Henry Simmons; Lisa Arrindell; Maya Angelou; Rochelle Aytes; Jenifer Lewis; Tangi Miller; Keke Palmer; Cicely Tyson
- Cinematography: Toyomichi Kurita
- Edited by: John Carter
- Music by: Elvin Ross; Tyler Perry
- Production companies: Tyler Perry Studios; Reuben Cannon Productions
- Distributed by: Lions Gate Films
- Release date: February 24, 2006
- Running time: 109 minutes
- Country: United States
- Language: English
- Budget: $6 million
- Box office: $63.4 million

Madea's Family Reunion is a 2006 American comedy-drama film and an adaptation of the stage production of the same name written by Tyler Perry. The film is a sequel to Diary of a Mad Black Woman. It was written, directed by, and starring Perry with the rest of the cast consisting of Blair Underwood, Lynn Whitfield, Boris Kodjoe, Henry Simmons, Lisa Arrindell, Maya Angelou, Rochelle Aytes, Jenifer Lewis, Tangi Miller, Keke Palmer, and Cicely Tyson. The film tells the story of Madea preparing for an upcoming family reunion while dealing with the dramas before and during it. It was released on February 24, 2006, nearly one year following its predecessor, Diary of a Mad Black Woman. The independent film was produced by Lionsgate. Madea's Family Reunion grossed $63.4 million worldwide.

== Plot ==
Lisa Breaux is engaged to Carlos Armstrong, an abusive investment banker. While Lisa wants to get out of the engagement, her mother Victoria urges her to go through with the wedding. Lisa's older sister Vanessa has two children by two different men, neither of whom are involved in their children's lives which Victoria regularly degrades Vanessa for. Vanessa is eventually wooed by bus driver Frankie Henderson, who is a single father and loves painting. Vanessa likes Frankie, but is emotionally distant and has a difficult time trusting him.

After Madea violates the terms of the house arrest she was previously subjected to (Note: As depicted in the previous film.) to get Joe's medicine with her lawyer nephew Brian corroborating on, Judge Mablean Ephriam orders her to take in a foster child named Nikki in order to avoid jail. At first, Madea and Nikki clash due to the latter's disrespect, stemming from her poor life, including an absent father, a mother in jail, and various uncaring foster homes. However, Madea urges her to overcome her past with hard work, and strive to be better than those who wronged her. Nikki, with consistent support from Madea, reforms her behavior.

Lisa eventually leaves Carlos with the intention of calling off the wedding, temporarily moving in with her great-aunt Madea and great-uncle Joe. Eager to get married, Carlos dispatches Victoria to bring Lisa back to him. Victoria confronts Carlos about the abuse. It is then revealed that Victoria, with Carlos's assistance, has stolen from Lisa's trust fund over the years, leaving virtually no money and is now encouraging Lisa to marry Carlos in order to keep up her livelihood. Carlos makes it clear to Victoria that he will not bail her out unless the wedding goes forward.

Victoria goes to Madea's house to fetch Lisa, only to end up in an argument with Vanessa, who has become aware of Carlos's abuse and wants to protect her sister. During the confrontation, Vanessa reveals that Victoria allowed her second husband, Lisa's father, to rape Vanessa in order to keep him in the marriage. The sexual abuse then occurred on a regular basis and left Vanessa closed-off emotionally and unable to trust the men in her life, including Frankie. Victoria rationalizes her actions, telling her daughters that they faced destitution if Lisa's father had left, and that after previous hardships, she was tired of struggling. She also retorts that her own mother, a prostitute and drug addict, regularly traded her for "ten dollars and a fix". Victoria then demands that a horrified Lisa begin taking care of her financially. She then leaves and later lies to Lisa, telling her that Carlos has agreed to counseling.

At the family reunion held at the home of 96-year-old Aunt Ruby, Vanessa and Victoria get into another confrontation, which eventually turns into a physical fight after Victoria insults Vanessa's relationship with Frankie. The fight is broken up when Aunt Ruby, Madea's daughter-in-law Myrtle, and Ruby's daughter Aunt May gather the family to an old slave shack where their ancestors grew up. Ruby expresses disappointment at how the family has turned out. Myrtle persuades them to act lovingly towards each other and themselves.

Lisa returns to Carlos and resumes her wedding plans. On the day of her wedding, Lisa flees from Carlos and retreats to Madea's house. Madea tells her that it is time for her to fight back. When Carlos arrives at Madea's house, Madea subtly suggests to Lisa to use the pot of hot grits on the stove to defend herself as Madea previously taught her. When Madea leaves the house, Carlos slaps Lisa. In retaliation, she throws the hot grits in Carlos' face, scalding him, then beats him with a cast-iron frying pan as Madea listens outside and laughs.

At the church, Lisa announces to the family and other guests that the wedding is off and exposes Carlos' abuse. Madea lambasts a sour Victoria and tells her to find her own life instead of continuing to live through Lisa. Frankie then asks Vanessa to marry him and she accepts. They are married at the church instead. At the reception, Victoria accepts Vanessa's marriage, revealing possible reconciliation.

== Cast ==
- Tyler Perry as:
  - Mabel "Madea" Simmons, the tough, ex-con, no nonsense matriarch of the family.
  - Joe Simmons, the brother of Madea who is a wisecracker.
  - Brian Simmons, a lawyer who is the son of Joe and the nephew of Madea.
- Blair Underwood as Carlos Armstrong, an abusive and controlling investment banker who is Lisa's fiance.
- Lynn Whitfield as Victoria Breaux, a gold-digging woman and a niece of Madea.
- Boris Kodjoe as Frankie Henderson, a bus driver who is also a painter.
- Henry Simmons as Isaac, a nephew of Madea who is antagonized by Joe when he was repairing Madea's lawnmower.
- Lisa Arrindell as Vanessa Breaux-Henderson, the grand-niece of Madea, oldest daughter of Victoria, and Lisa's older sister who falls for Frankie after two bad relationships.
- Maya Angelou as Aunt May, a cousin of Madea.
- Rochelle Aytes as Lisa Breaux, Vanessa's younger sister, Victoria's youngest daughter, and Madea's 2nd grand-niece who is to be engaged to Carlos.
- Jenifer Lewis as Milay Jenay Lori, a wedding planner who was hired by Victoria.
- Keke Palmer as Nikki Grady, a girl who Madea takes in.
- Tangi Miller as Donna, the love interest of Isaac and sister of Brian.
- Cicely Tyson as Aunt Myrtle, Madea's daughter-in-law.
- China Anderson as Nima, the daughter of Vanessa.
- Akhil Jackson as Jonathan, the son of Vanessa and the younger half-brother of Nima.
- Alonzo Millsap as Tre, the son of Frankie.
- Georgia Allen as Aunt Ruby, a 96-year-old aunt of Madea who is the mother of May and Sarah.
- Cassi Davis as Aunt Sarah, a cousin of Madea and the sister of May.
- Leon Lamar as Grover, a cousin of Madea and Joe.
- John Lawhorn as Uncle Pete, a cousin of Madea and Joe.
- Afemo Omilami as Isaac Sr., the father of Isaac and cousin of Madea and Joe.
- Mablean Ephriam as Herself
- Deanna Dawn as Tyrequa
- Enoch King as Hykeem
- Jennifer Sears as an unnamed female at the family reunion.
- Tre Rogers as an unnamed young man at the family reunion.
- Elizabeth Omilami as Aunt Clara, a relative of Madea.
- Nicholas Ortiz as Himself
- Johnny Gill as a wedding singer
- David Wiebers as Wedding Trumpeter
- China Anne McClain as Youth (uncredited)

== Soundtrack ==
The soundtrack was released by Motown Records on February 21, 2006.

Track listing
| No. | Title | Performer(s) | Length |
|---|---|---|---|
| 1. | "Find Myself in You" | Brian McKnight | 4:14 |
| 2. | "We're Gonna Make It" | LL Cool J and Mary Mary | 4:54 |
| 3. | "Keep Your Head Up" | Chaka Khan | 4:34 |
| 4. | "Tonight" | Kem | 3:55 |
| 5. | "Everyday (Family Reunion)" | Chaka Khan, Carl Thomas, Yolanda Adams, and Gerald Levert | 4:48 |
| 6. | "Love and Happiness" | Al Green | 5:02 |
| 7. | "You For Me (Wedding Song)" | Johnny Gill | 5:37 |
| 8. | "Family Reunion" | The O'Jays | 6:55 |
| 9. | "I'll Be" | Will Downing | 4:10 |
| 10. | "Wounds in the Way" | Rachelle Ferrell | 4:21 |

== Release and reception ==
=== Box office ===
Madea's Family Reunion was budgeted at $6 million and opened at #1 in its opening weekend (2/24-26) with $30,030,661 and eventually grossed $63,257,940 in North America with an additional $50,939 internationally, tying $63,308,879 worldwide after 9 weeks in theaters.

Small independent filmmaker Tyler Perry has garnered one of the highest wide-release openings to date in 2006, in both gross ($30 million) and screen average ($13,687).

"The number one movie is Madea's Family Reunion, a small comedy/melodrama which grossed an astounding $30.3 million from 2,194 venues. It had a super-hot venue average of $13,787...."

"Playing at 2,194 locations across North America, the film averaged a remarkable estimated $13,788 per screen, demonstrating the enormous breadth and depth of Perry's audience. The debut weekend of Madea's Family Reunion outperformed the opening weekend of Lionsgate's first Tyler Perry film, Diary of a Mad Black Woman, by nearly 40 percent." To illustrate the point, Lions Gate's exit polls showed 52 percent of the audience were black women over the age of 35.

=== Critical response ===
On Rotten Tomatoes it has an approval rating of 26%, based on 58 reviews. The site's consensus reads "Tyler Perry's Madea's Family Reunion is sincere in its positive intentions, but leaves something to be desired as a film." On Metacritic, it has a score of 45% based on reviews from 18 critics, indicating "mixed or average reviews". Audiences polled by CinemaScore gave the film an A grade.
