= A Madea Family Funeral =

2019 American comedy film directed by Tyler Perry

- Theatrical release poster
- Directed by: Tyler Perry
- Written by: Tyler Perry
- Produced by: Tyler Perry; Ozzie Areu; Will Areu; Mark E. Swinton
- Starring: Cassi Davis; Patrice Lovely; Tyler Perry
- Cinematography: Richard Vialet
- Edited by: Larry Sexton
- Music by: Philip White
- Production company: Tyler Perry Studios
- Distributed by: Lionsgate
- Release date: March 1, 2019
- Running time: 109 minutes
- Country: United States
- Language: English
- Budget: $20 million
- Box office: $75.8 million

A Madea Family Funeral is a 2019 American comedy film written, directed, and produced by Tyler Perry. It is the eleventh installment of the Madea cinematic universe and stars Perry in several roles, including the titular character, as well as Cassi Davis and Patrice Lovely. The plot follows Madea and her friends as they must set up an unexpected funeral during a family get-together in Maxine, Georgia.

The film was released in the United States on March 1, 2019. The film grossed $75.8 million worldwide. This is the last film from Tyler Perry to be released by Lionsgate, with Paramount Pictures and Netflix taking over distribution of future Perry films via his deal with ViacomCBS. It is also, as of 2025, the last Madea film to be released theatrically. Though A Madea Family Funeral was originally intended to be the final film in the series, a sequel titled A Madea Homecoming was released in 2022.

== Plot ==
In Maxine, Georgia, A.J., Jesse, and Sylvia are planning a surprise party to celebrate the 40th wedding anniversary of their parents, Vianne and Anthony, with the assistance of A.J.'s wife, Carol. Madea, Joe, Brian, Aunt Bam, and Hattie travel to the backwoods of Georgia for the anniversary party. Also in attendance for the anniversary party is Madea and Joe's brother Heathrow. On the way, they deal with a manic, rude police officer, and they are surprised when he acts nice all of a sudden.

At last, they get to their hotel—and catch Anthony in a sex act with Renee, Vianne's best friend, while A.J. is in the next room with Jesse's fiancée, Gia. Anthony suffers a heart attack from sex with Renee, and Brian tries to resuscitate him, after which he is rushed to the hospital. Anthony's family was informed of the incident and met with Brian's group. As Vianne praises Brian for trying his best to resuscitate Anthony, a doctor tells the entire group that Anthony is dead.

A.J. and Madea's group keep the exact cause of death a secret from the rest of the family. Renee and A.J. blackmail each other to keep their secrets hidden, and A.J. blames Renee for his father's affair and death. But Renee responds, "I'm not the one [to be played with]."

Vianne asks Madea to plan Anthony's funeral and says she wants to have it in two days, which makes everyone suspicious. The undertaker at the funeral gives Madea, Bam, and Hattie a creepy vibe as he informs them that Anthony died smiling and that the casket cannot close because of Anthony's erection. At the funeral, presided over by Madea, non-family members are made to sit on one side of the room, but the area is filled with numerous mistresses from Anthony's, visibly upsetting Vianne. The service lasts for hours until the casket abruptly opens (for the reason above), causing everyone to leave in a panic.

At the repast, a drunk A.J. reveals Anthony and Renee's affair. Renee then exposes A.J.'s affair with Gia as she gets kicked out of the house. This makes Carol heartbroken and decide to leave him. A.J. and Jesse fight, and Vianne tearfully reveals that she knows Anthony has been unfaithful for years. Despite this, she only stayed with him to protect her family and chooses to live for herself from now on. When A.J. scolds her for being weak, she retaliates by saying he is just a boy and spiteful to others, forcing him to own up to his actions and what they did to those around.

In the morning, Madea gets A.J. to apologize and try reconciling with Carol. Despite forgiving A.J., Carol refuses to stay with him, claiming she wants to live freely. Vianne happily wishes the family luck as she leaves for Las Vegas with Roy, revealing that she was also having an affair while noting that Roy should have been their father. Madea, Bam, Hattie, and Carol then take their leave so that A.J., Sylvia, and Jesse can sort out their issues.

== Cast ==
- Tyler Perry as:
  - Mabel "Madea" Simmons, a tough old lady
  - Joe Simmons, Madea's brother
  - Brian Simmons, the son of Joe and nephew of Madea and Heathrow who works as a lawyer
  - Heathrow Simmons is the paraplegic brother of Madea and Joe, the uncle of Brian, and the father of Vianne. While Heathrow claims to be a war hero who is in a wheelchair upon losing his legs and speaks with a voice box because of a smoking problem, Madea claims that Heathrow lost his legs upon hitting on a mobster's girlfriend while Joe claims that Heathrow is diabetic.
- Cassi Davis as Aunt Bam, Madea's cousin
- Patrice Lovely as Hattie, a friend of Madea and Bam
- Jen Harper as Vianne, Anthony's wife, Heathrow's daughter, and Madea and Joe's niece
- Derek Morgan as Anthony, Vianne's husband who has an untimely death
- Courtney Burrell as A.J., Anthony and Vianne's oldest son
- Ciera Payton as Sylvia, Anthony and Vianne's daughter
- Rome Flynn as Jesse, Anthony and Vianne's youngest son
- KJ Smith as Carol, A.J.'s wife
- Aeriél Miranda as Gia, Jesse's fiancée
- David Otunga as Will, Silvia's husband
- Quin Walters as Renee, Anthony and Vianne's friend who was also one of Anthony's mistresses
- Christianee G. Porter as Soloist
- Joel Rush as Officer Edward "Eddie" Willis, a police officer in Maxine, Georgia, who pulls Brian over. Rush reprises his character from If Loving You Is Wrong.
- Mike Tyson as Roy, a man who Vianne was secretly having an affair with
- Ary Katz as Undertaker
- Selena Anduze as Doctor
- Darryl Handy as Reverend
- Tiffany Black as Anthony's Mistress
- Branden Miller as Joanne the Scammer, a drag queen and con artist who Madea knows

== Production ==
Filming took place at Tyler Perry Studios in Atlanta for one week in March 2017 before filming Boo 2! A Madea Halloween, given that this film was released two years after that film. In this movie, Tyler Perry plays a new character named Heathrow, Madea and Joe's brother, a Vietnam War veteran.

== Release ==
The film was released in theatres in the United States on March 1, 2019 by Lionsgate, after it was originally scheduled for release in the fall of 2018.

Lionsgate released a trailer for the film on October 31, 2018.

Lionsgate released the film on Blu-ray and DVD on June 4, 2019.

== Reception ==
=== Box office ===
A Madea Family Funeral has grossed $73.3 million in the United States and Canada, and $1.5 million in other territories, for a worldwide total of $74.8 million, against a production budget of $20 million.

In the United States and Canada, A Madea Family Funeral was released alongside Greta, and was projected to gross $18–20 million from 2,442 theaters in its opening weekend. It made $1.1 million from Thursday night previews, a record for the Madea films, as well as one of the highest of Perry's career. It debuted to $27.1 million, finishing second at the box office behind holdover How to Train Your Dragon: The Hidden World and marking the third-best opening of the series. In its second weekend the film dropped 53% to $12.5 million, finishing third behind newcomer Captain Marvel and How to Train Your Dragon, and then made $8.1 million in its third weekend, finishing fifth.

=== Critical response ===
On review aggregator Rotten Tomatoes, the film holds an approval rating of 11% based on 36 reviews, with an average rating of 3.7/10. The website's critical consensus reads, "A lackluster conclusion to Tyler Perry's long-running franchise, A Madea Family Funeral proves saying goodbye can be painful for all the wrong reasons." On Metacritic, the film has a weighted average score of 39 out of 100, based on 11 critics, indicating "generally unfavorable" reviews. Audiences polled by CinemaScore gave the film an average grade of "A−" on an A+ to F scale, while those at PostTrak gave it a 4 out of 5 stars and a 67% "definite recommend".

For The A.V. Club, Ignatiy Vishnevetsky rated the film D+, summing up the film franchise by writing, "The films are inane, sloppy, tone-deaf, moralizing, and have no sense of quality control, but there's nothing quite like them."

Common Sense Media gave the film a 3 out of 5 star rating, saying, "Madea says goodbye in winning but dirty slapstick comedy"; the website recommended it for ages 13+.

== Accolades ==
Awards and nominations for A Madea Family Funeral
Award	Date of ceremony	Category	Recipient(s)	Result
Golden Raspberry Awards	March 16, 2020	Worst Picture	Tyler Perry, Ozzie Areu, Will Areu & Mark E. Swinton	Nominated
Golden Raspberry Awards	March 16, 2020	Worst Actress	Tyler Perry	Nominated
Golden Raspberry Awards	March 16, 2020	Worst Supporting Actor	Tyler Perry*	Nominated
Golden Raspberry Awards	March 16, 2020	Worst Supporting Actor	Tyler Perry*	Nominated
Golden Raspberry Awards	March 16, 2020	Worst Supporting Actress	Cassi Davis	Nominated
Golden Raspberry Awards	March 16, 2020	Worst Screen Combo	Tyler Perry & Tyler Perry (or Tyler Perry)	Nominated
Golden Raspberry Awards	March 16, 2020	Worst Screenplay	Tyler Perry	Nominated
Golden Raspberry Awards	March 16, 2020	Worst Prequel, Remake, Rip-off or Sequel		Nominated

* - Perry was nominated twice for Worst Supporting Actor, once each for his roles as Joe and Uncle Heathrow.
