= A Madea Christmas (musical play) =

2011 stage play by Tyler Perry

- Original language: English
- Written by: Tyler Perry
- Characters: Madea, Aunt Bam, Lillian, Margaret, China, Japan, Eric, Hattie, John, George, Lucy and Bobby
- Subject: Family, Holidays
- Genre: Comedy-Drama
- Setting: The Hamptons

Premiere
- Date: May 13, 2011
- Place: Atlanta

A Madea Christmas is a 2011 American stage play created, produced, written, and directed by Tyler Perry. It stars Tyler Perry as Mabel "Madea" Simmons and Cassi Davis as Aunt Bam. The play also marks the debut appearance of Hattie Mae Love, played by Patrice Lovely. The live performance released on DVD on November 22, 2011 was recorded live in Atlanta at the Cobb Energy Performing Arts Centre in May 2011. This was Perry's first production that wasn't available on tour and had only 2 premiere performances.

== Plot ==
The members of the Mansell family—who can be identified without fear of stereotyping as mean mother Lillian, pompous father John, restless daughter China, and virginal son Japan —prepare for the holiday feast with the help of their saintly maid Margaret and their mouthy chef Hattie. Eager to impress China's super-rich beau/presumed fiancé Bobby, Lilian forces Margaret to work on Christmas instead of celebrating with her family. So China secretly invites the whole disreputable brood: Madea, Aunt Bam, and grown children Lucy, George, and Eric. China was once in love with Eric; his reappearance lets her rethink her relationship with Bobby.

== Cast ==
- Tyler Perry as Madea
- Cassi Davis as Aunt Bam
- Patrice Lovely as Hattie
- Chandra Currelley-Young as Lillian Mansell
- Cheryl Pepsii Riley as Margaret
- Maurice Lauchner as John Mansell
- Támar Davis as China Mansell
- Zuri Craig as Japan Mansell
- Tony Grant as Eric
- Jeffery Lewis as George
- Alexis Jones as Lucy
- Shannon Williams as Bobby

== The Band ==
- Ronnie Garrett - Musical Director & Bass Guitar
- Derek Scott - Guitar
- Marcus Williams - Drums
- Michael Burton - Saxophone
- Justin Gilbert - Keyboards
- Aaron Draper - Percussion
- Jeff Bradshaw - Trombone
- Natalie Ragins - Keyboards & Organ
- Melvin Jones - Trumpet
- Sheryl Boyd - Background Vocals & Lucy (Understudy)
- Natasha Evans - Background Vocals
- Tony Hightower - Background Vocals

== Musical Numbers ==
All songs written and/or produced by Tyler Perry and Elvin D. Ross.

- "O Come, All Ye Faithful" - Margaret, Lillian, Hattie, Japan & John
- "What About Us?" - Japan & China
- "That's My Little Girl..." - John
- "I Pray" - Margaret
- "Who's It Gonna Be?" - Eric
- Gospel Medley
  1. "Jesus Never Fails" - Margaret & Hattie
  2. "Tis' So Sweet to Trust in Jesus" - Aunt Bam
  3. "What a Friend We Have in Jesus" - Lillian
- "Lord I Need You More Than Ever Before" - Lillian
- "Please Be The Man" - China
- "O Holy Night" - Eric
- "Mary Did You Know?" - Lucy & John
- "Do You Hear What I Hear?" - China & George

== Film adaptation ==
The film Tyler Perry's A Madea Christmas was released in theaters on December 13, 2013. However, the film version is only connected to the stageplay via name-only. Otherwise, it has a completely different storyline and different characters.
