= Tyler Perry =

American actor and filmmaker (born 1969)

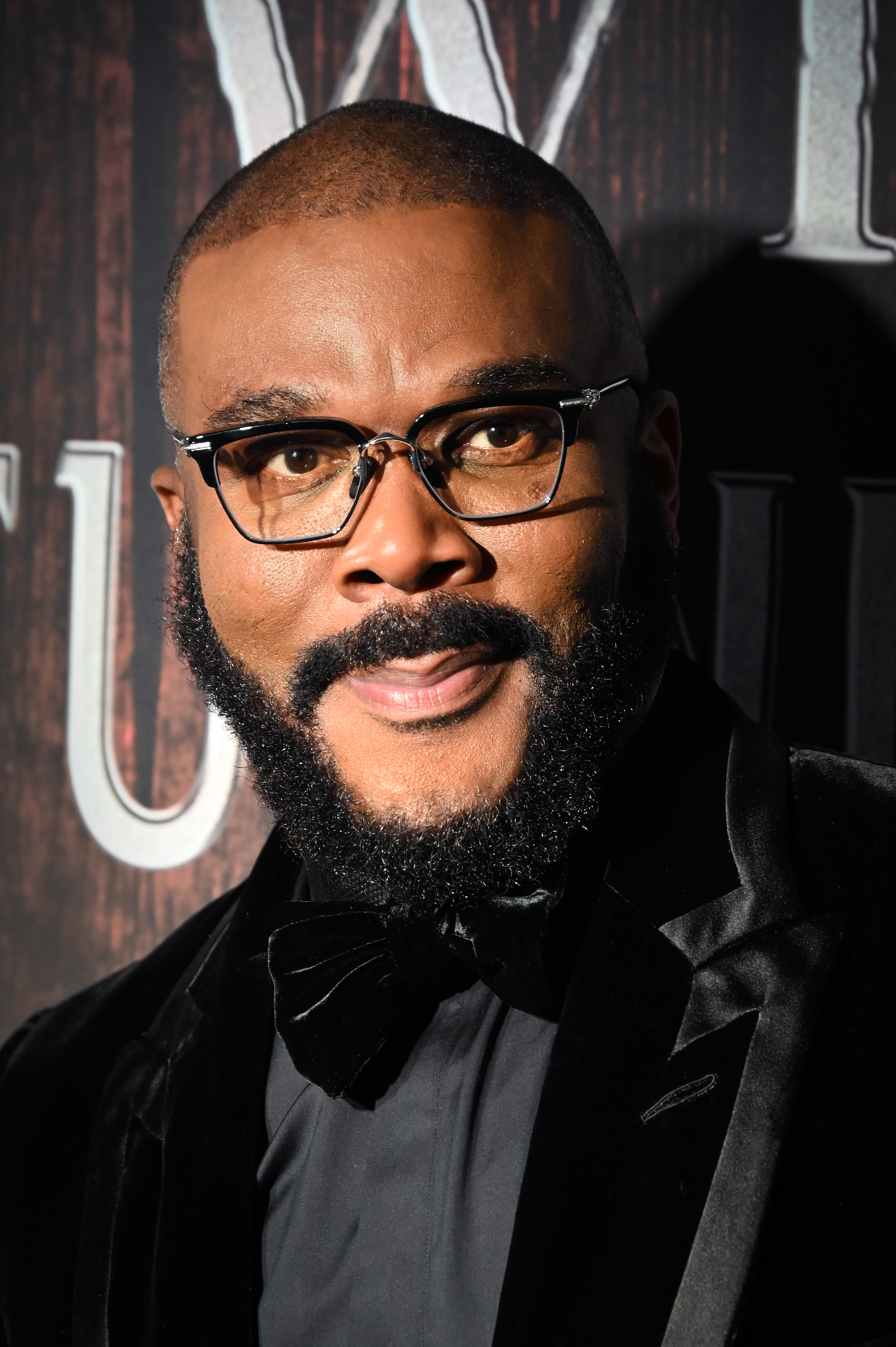
- Perry in 2026
- Born: Emmitt Perry Jr. September 13, 1969 (age 57); New Orleans, Louisiana, U.S.
- Occupations: Actor; director; producer; screenwriter; playwright
- Years active: 1992–present
- Partner: Gelila Bekele (2009–2020)
- Children: 1
- Website: tylerperry.com

Tyler Perry (born Emmitt Perry Jr.; September 13, 1969) is an American filmmaker and actor. His films vary in style from orthodox filmmaking techniques to filmed productions of live stage plays, many of which have been subsequently adapted into feature films. Perry is the creator and performer of Mabel "Madea" Simmons, a tough elderly woman, and also portrays her brother Joe Simmons and her nephew Brian Simmons. Madea's first appearance was in I Can Do Bad All by Myself (1999) staged in Chicago.

Perry has written and produced many stage plays, which were at their successful peak in the 1990s and the 2000s. His breakthrough performance came in 2005 with the film Diary of a Mad Black Woman, which he wrote and produced as an adaptation of his stage play of the same name. He has also developed numerous television series, most notably Tyler Perry's House of Payne, which ran for eight seasons on TBS from 2006 to 2012, before being renewed in 2020. In 2011, Forbes listed him as the highest-paid man in entertainment, earning $130 million between May 2010 and May 2011. In 2012, Perry struck an exclusive multi-year partnership with Oprah Winfrey and her Oprah Winfrey Network (OWN). The deal featured scripted projects such as The Haves and the Have Nots. In 2019, he produced the political drama series The Oval for BET.

Outside of his own productions, Perry has been cast in numerous Hollywood films including Star Trek (2009), Alex Cross (2012), Gone Girl (2014), Teenage Mutant Ninja Turtles: Out of the Shadows (2016), Vice (2018), Those Who Wish Me Dead (2021), and Don't Look Up (2021). Perry has also done voice acting for animated films such as The Star (2017) and Paw Patrol: The Movie (2021).

Perry's films and shows have cumulatively grossed over $660 million, and his net worth is an estimated $1 billion, making him one of the richest people in the entertainment industry. Despite commercial success, his productions have received criticism from critics and scholars who believe his films perpetuate negative or offensive portrayals of African Americans, along with the critical reception itself being largely negative. In 2020, Perry was included in Time's list of the 100 most influential people and received the Governor's Award from the Academy of Television Arts & Sciences. Additionally, he received the Jean Hersholt Humanitarian Award from the Academy Awards in 2021, and was inducted into the Black Music & Entertainment Walk of Fame the following year.

== Early life ==
Tyler Perry was born as Emmitt Perry Jr. in New Orleans, Louisiana, to Willie Maxine Perry (née Campbell). He has three siblings. Perry's mother was married to Emmitt Perry Sr., who abused both Perry and his mother. Perry has described his childhood as a "living hell". However, his mother took him to church each week, and he sensed a certain refuge and contentment there. At age 16, he had his first name legally changed from Emmitt to Tyler in an effort to distance himself from Emmitt Sr. A DNA test taken by Perry as an adult indicated that Emmitt Sr. is not Perry's biological father.

Many years later, after seeing the film Precious, Perry revealed for the first time that he had been molested by a friend's mother at age 10. He was also molested by three men as a child, and he later learned that one of his friends had been molested by Emmitt Sr.

While Perry did not complete high school, he earned a General Educational Development (GED). In his early 20s, watching an episode of The Oprah Winfrey Show, he heard someone describe that sometimes the act of writing can have a therapeutic effect, enabling the author to work out his or her own problems. This comment inspired him to apply himself to a career in writing. He soon started writing a series of letters to himself, which became the basis for the musical I Know I've Been Changed.

== Career ==
=== Stage ===
Around 1990, Perry moved to Atlanta, where two years later I Know I've Been Changed was first performed at a community theater, financed by the 22-year-old Perry's life savings of US$12,000 (equivalent to $29,572 in 2025). The play included Christian themes of forgiveness, dignity, and self-worth, while addressing issues such as child abuse and dysfunctional families. The musical initially received a "less than stellar" reception and was a financial failure.

Perry persisted, and over the next six years he rewrote the musical repeatedly, though lackluster reviews continued. In 1998, at age 28, he succeeded in retooling the play and restaging it in Atlanta, first at the House of Blues, then at the Fox Theatre. Perry continued to create new stage productions, touring with them on the so-called "Chitlin' Circuit", now also known as the "urban theater circuit" and developing a large, devoted following among African-American audiences. In 2005, Forbes reported that he had sold "more than $100 million in tickets, $30 million in videos of his shows and an estimated $20 million in merchandise", and "the 300 live shows he produces each year are attended by an average of 35,000 people a week".

=== Films ===
Perry raised a US$5.5 million budget in part from the ticket sales of his stage productions to fund his first movie, Diary of a Mad Black Woman, which went on to gross US$50.6 million domestically, while scoring a 16% approval rating at the film review web site Rotten Tomatoes. Perry made his directorial debut on his next film, an adaptation of Madea's Family Reunion, and has directed all of his subsequent Madea films. On its opening weekend, February 24–26, 2006, Madea's Family Reunion opened at number one at the box office with $30.3 million. The film eventually grossed $65 million. Perry and his co-stars promoted the film on The Oprah Winfrey Show. As with Diary, almost all of the Madea's earnings have been generated in the United States.

Perry's next Lionsgate project, Daddy's Little Girls, starred Gabrielle Union and Idris Elba and was released in the United States on February 14, 2007. It grossed over US$31 million. Perry wrote, directed, produced and starred in his next film, Why Did I Get Married?, released on October 12, 2007. It opened at number one, grossing US$21.4 million that weekend. It is loosely based on his play of the same name. Filming began March 5, 2007, in Whistler, British Columbia, a resort town north of Vancouver, then moved to Atlanta, where Perry had opened his own studio. Janet Jackson, Sharon Leal, Jill Scott, and Tasha Smith appeared in the film. Perry's 2008 film, Meet the Browns, released on March 21, opened at number 2 with a US$20.1 million weekend gross. The Family That Preys opened on September 12, 2008, and grossed over US$37.1 million.

Madea Goes to Jail opened at number one on February 20, 2009, grossing US$41 million and becoming his largest opening to date. This was Perry's seventh film with Lionsgate Entertainment. At the request of director J. J. Abrams, also in 2009, Perry had a small role as the Starfleet Academy commandant Admiral Barnett in Star Trek, which opened on May 8. This was his first film appearance outside of his own projects. Perry next wrote, directed, and starred in I Can Do Bad All by Myself (2009), named after the known stage play. This was Perry's eighth film and it also made number one at the box office. In 2009, Perry teamed with Oprah Winfrey to present Precious, a film based on the novel Push by Sapphire. Why Did I Get Married Too?, the sequel to Why Did I Get Married?, opened in theaters on April 2, 2010. It featured Janet Jackson, Tasha Smith, Jill Scott, and Malik Yoba. The film grossed US$60 million domestically, with US$29 million made the opening weekend.

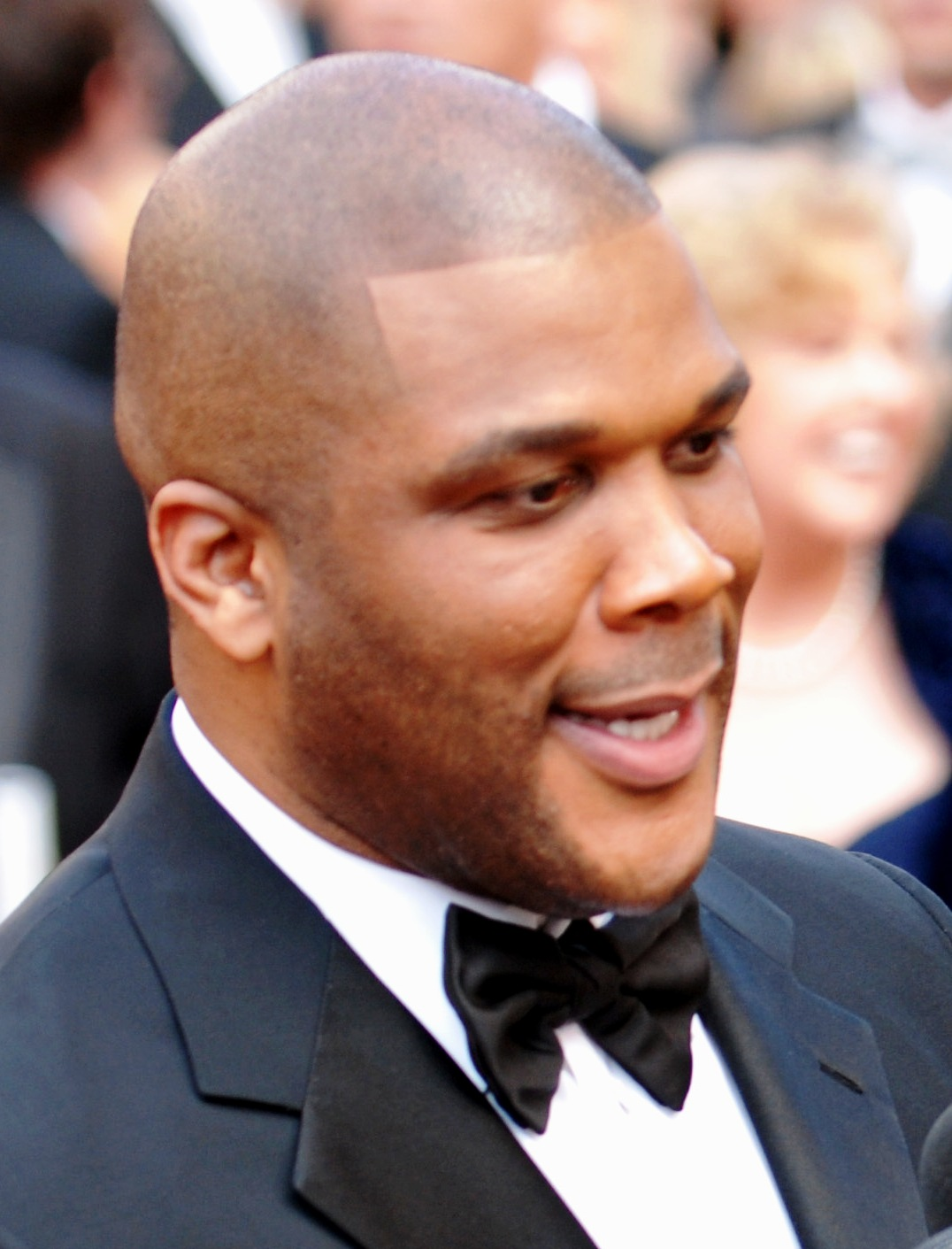
Perry at the 82nd Academy Awards ceremony, 2010

Perry directed a film adaptation of Ntozake Shange's 1975 choreopoem For Colored Girls Who Have Considered Suicide When the Rainbow Is Enuf, which was released in theaters November 5, 2010. He appeared in the stage show Madea's Big Happy Family, which toured the U.S. as a stage play and was released as adapted months later, only to be released in 2011, written, directed by and starring Perry. The film version of Madea's Big Happy Family raked in US$25.8 million at the box office, taking second place.

Perry's next film with Lionsgate was Good Deeds, in which Perry plays lead character Wesley Deeds. Good Deeds is a romantic drama film written, directed by, and starring Perry. The film was released on February 24, 2012. It is the tenth of eleven films that Perry directed and appears in. The film received a 29% rating by review aggregator Rotten Tomatoes and opened with a box office US$15.5 million gross. The movie also stars Thandiwe Newton, Rebecca Romijn, Gabrielle Union, Eddie Cibrian, Jamie Kennedy, Phylicia Rashad, and others.

As of June 2011, Perry's films had grossed over US$500 million worldwide. Perry's Madea's Witness Protection, his seventh film within the Madea franchise, was released on June 29, 2012.

Perry took over the role of James Patterson's Alex Cross from Morgan Freeman for a new film in the series, titled Alex Cross. The film which opened on October 19, 2012, was panned by critics and audiences, with Rotten Tomatoes scores of 11% & 47% positive respectively, and became a box office bomb. His performance gained the attention of director David Fincher, who subsequently cast Perry in his 2014 thriller Gone Girl, co-starring with Ben Affleck, Rosamund Pike, and Neil Patrick Harris.

Perry released his thirteenth film, Temptation: Confessions of a Marriage Counselor (based on his 2008 play of the same name) on March 29, 2013. The film stars Lance Gross, Jurnee Smollett, Brandy Norwood, Robbie Jones, Vanessa L. Williams, and Kim Kardashian. He produced Tyler Perry Presents Peeples, released on May 10, 2013. He returned to the big screen with A Madea Christmas, released on December 13, 2013. Perry directed the film The Single Moms Club, which opened on March 14, 2014. His first animated movie Madea's Tough Love was released on DVD January 20, 2015. In 2016, Perry played scientist Baxter Stockman in Teenage Mutant Ninja Turtles: Out of the Shadows.

In mid-January 2016, Perry started filming his seventeenth film, and ninth within the Madea franchise, Boo! A Madea Halloween. The film was released on October 21, 2016. A sequel, Boo 2! A Madea Halloween, was released in October 2017. Perry, alongside Oprah Winfrey, lent his voice in his first animated film, called The Star, which is based on the Nativity of Jesus. Developed by Sony Pictures Animation, the film was released on November 17, 2017. Perry's Madea franchise film Joe's College Road Trip, which instead features Madea's brother Joe as the star character, was released on Netflix on February 13, 2026.

==== Film partnerships and distribution ====
Perry's films are co-produced and distributed by Lions Gate Entertainment; he retains full copyright ownership under the corporate name Tyler Perry Films, and places his name in front of all titles. Perry's movies have seen very limited release outside North America, but in May 2010, Lionsgate announced plans to begin releasing his films in the United Kingdom.

=== Television programs ===
Perry produced the long-running sitcom Tyler Perry's House of Payne, which initially ran for 6 seasons from June 21, 2006, to August 10, 2012, before being revived in 2020 and, as of September 2025, running for 12 seasons, the most any show with a predominately African American cast. The series followed an African-American household of three generations. The show demonstrated the family members' serious, true-to-life struggles with faith and love. The show ran in the spring of 2006 as a 10-show pilot. After the successful pilot run, Perry signed a US$200 million, 100-episode deal with TBS. On June 6, 2007, the first two episodes of Tyler Perry's House of Payne ran on TBS. After receiving high ratings, House of Payne entered broadcast syndication. Reruns were played through December 2007 before the second season began. Perry also wrote, directed and produced the sitcom Meet the Browns, which premiered on TBS on January 7, 2009, and ended on November 18, 2011.

==== OWN and partnership with Oprah ====
In 2009, Perry co-produced Precious: Based on the Novel 'Push' by Sapphire alongside Oprah Winfrey and Lee Daniels. The film was directed by Daniels and starred Gabourey Sidibe and Mo'Nique. While promoting the film Oprah told an interviewer, "I think [Perry] grew up being raised by strong, black women. And so much of what he does is really in celebration of that. I think that's what Madea really is: a compilation of all those strong black women that I know and maybe you do too? And so the reason it works is because people see themselves."

On October 2, 2012, Perry struck an exclusive multi-year partnership with Oprah Winfrey and her Oprah Winfrey Network (OWN). The partnership was largely for the purposes of bringing scripted television to OWN, Perry having had previous success in this department.

Tyler Perry's For Better or Worse, based on his films Why Did I Get Married? and Why Did I Get Married Too?, premiered on TBS on November 25, 2011. The series was cancelled by TBS in February 2013 but was revived by OWN for a third season, which began on September 18, 2013.

Perry had two other television series featured on OWN: the hour-long soap opera/drama series The Haves and the Have Nots and the sitcom Love Thy Neighbor. The Haves and the Have Nots premiered on May 28, 2013, and completed its series run after 8 seasons on July 20, 2021. The program was credited by Oprah Winfrey as bringing success to her network and opened the door for a host of other highly rated dramas to OWN. During its series run, The Haves and the Have Nots had numerous Nielsen rating highs for the OWN broadcasting station: it was reported on May 29, 2013, that The Haves and the Have Nots set a new record for OWN, scoring the highest ratings ever for a series premiere on the network. Love Thy Neighbor scored the second highest ratings ever for a series premiere on OWN, behind The Haves and the Have Nots. The Haves and the Have Nots gave OWN some of its highest ratings during its 8-year series run, the program hailed as "one of OWN's biggest success stories with its weekly dose of soapy fun, filled with the typical betrayals, affairs and manipulations."

Contrastingly, Love Thy Neighbor had struggled in ratings. The Have and the Have Nots remained the network's highest rated program for most of its run. On February 4, 2014, The Haves and the Have Nots came in as the most watched program in all of cable television for the night. On March 11, 2014, a Haves and the Have Nots season 2 episode set an OWN record when it scored the highest ratings in the network's history. The record-breaking episode brought in 3.6 million viewers, surpassing the 3.5 million that tuned in for the Oprah's Next Chapter interview with Bobbi Kristina which was the network's previous highest rated viewing.

On January 9, 2014, as part of Perry's continued partnership with OWN, the network ordered its fourth scripted series (and fourth series by Perry) based on the feature film, The Single Moms Club, called If Loving You Is Wrong. The hour-long drama series premiered on September 9, 2014.

==== Tyler Perry Studios ====
In 2015, Perry acquired the 330-acre (130 ha) former military base Fort McPherson located in Atlanta, which he converted to studios. The studios were used to film the HBO Films/OWN film version of The Immortal Life of Henrietta Lacks, and later for the television series The Walking Dead. 50,000 square feet (4,600 m^{2}) of the site are dedicated to standing permanent sets, including a replica of a luxury-hotel lobby, a White House replica, a 16,000-square-foot (1,500 m^{2}) mansion, a mock cheap hotel, a trailer-park set, and a real 1950s-style diner that was relocated from a town 100 miles (160 km) away. It also hosts 12 sound stages named after highly accomplished African Americans in the entertainment industry. The blockbuster Marvel film, Black Panther, was the first to be filmed on one of the new stages at Tyler Perry Studios as announced personally by Perry on his Instagram account on February 19, 2018.

Tyler Perry Studios is one of the largest film studios in the United States, and it established Perry as the second African American to own a major film studio outright, after Tim and Daphne Reid.

==== ViacomCBS ====
On June 14, 2017, Perry signed a long-term deal with Viacom (now ViacomCBS) for 90 episodes/year of original drama and comedy series. Viacom will also have distribution rights to short video content and a first look at film concepts (the first film from this deal was Nobody’s Fool). The TV deal began fall 2019 with The Oval, Sistas and BET+ (a brand new streaming service) premiering with strong ratings for BET.

==== Amazon Prime ====
On November 5, 2025, Perry's comedy series Tyler Perry's Finding Joy debuted on Amazon Prime.

=== Books ===
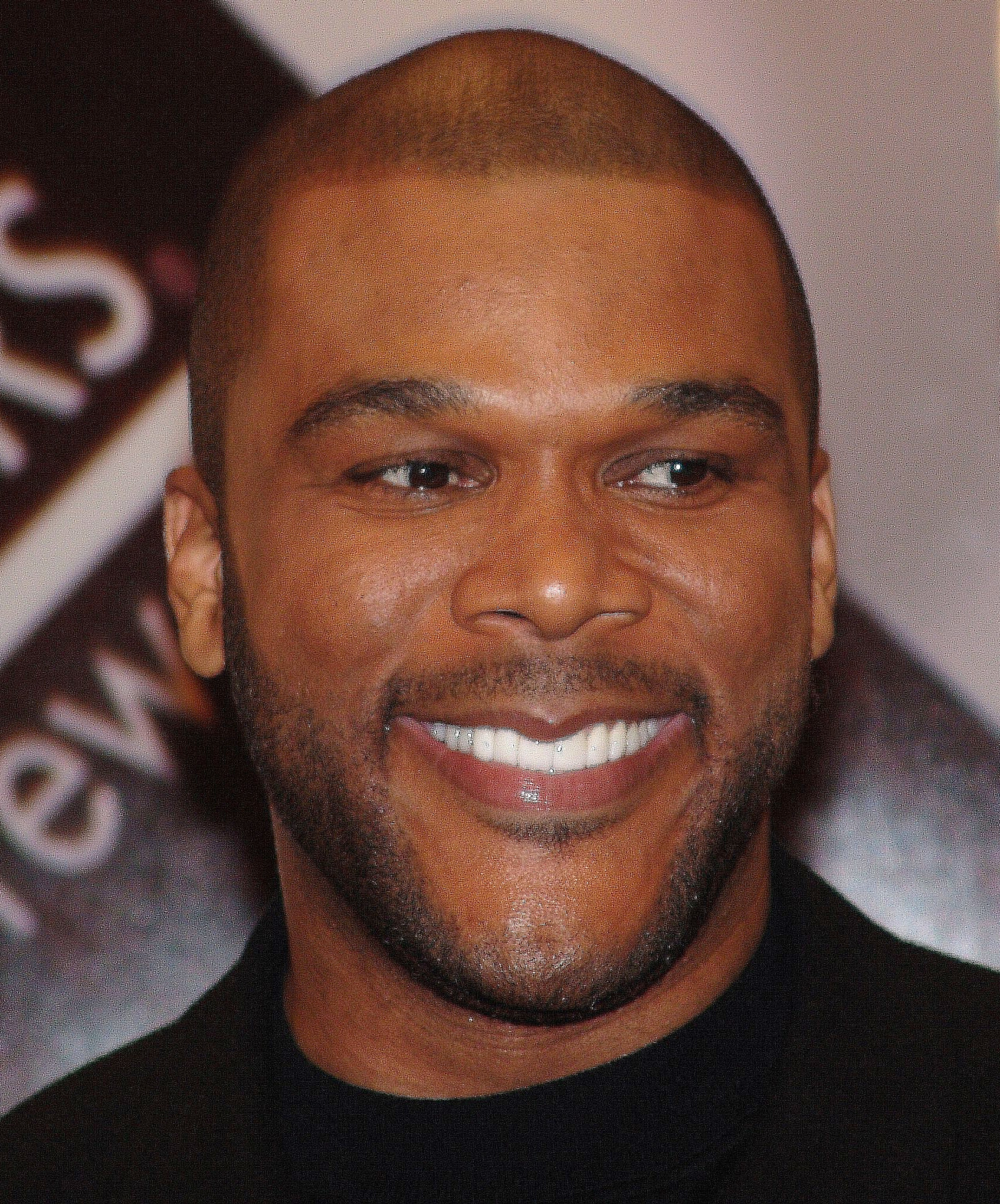
Perry at a book signing in 2006

Perry's first book, Don't Make a Black Woman Take Off Her Earrings: Madea's Uninhibited Commentaries on Love and Life, appeared on April 11, 2006. The book sold 30,000 copies. The hardcover reached number one on the New York Times Best Seller list and remained on the list for 12 weeks. It was voted Book of the Year, Best Humor Book at the 2006 Quill Awards.

His second book, Higher Is Waiting, was published on November 14, 2017. It debuted at number 5 on the New York Times Best Seller list.

== Public image ==
Tyler Perry's work has garnered both commercial success and critical discussion. While his films and television shows have achieved significant popularity, some critics have expressed concerns regarding the portrayal of African-American characters and reliance on certain stereotypes. Author Donald Bogle, in an interview with Entertainment Weekly, noted similarities between Perry's Madea character and traditional "mammy" archetypes, suggesting that such representations might be viewed differently if presented by a white director. Journalist Jamilah Lemieux, in an open letter published by NPR, acknowledged Perry's contributions to Black employment in the entertainment industry but also criticized shows like Meet the Browns and House of Payne for featuring what she described as "old stereotypes of buffoonish, emasculated black men and crass, sassy black women."

Filmmaker Spike Lee has also commented on Perry's work. In 2009, Lee referred to certain portrayals in Perry's productions as "coonery buffoonery," expressing concern over the imaging in contemporary Black media. Perry responded by emphasizing that his characters are designed to be relatable and to convey messages about faith and family, aiming to serve audiences he feels are often overlooked by mainstream media.

Perry's productions have been parodied in popular media. For instance, the animated series The Boondocks featured an episode titled "Pause," which satirized aspects of Perry's work, particularly his cross-dressing Madea character. Reports indicated that Perry was displeased with the portrayal, leading to the episode's removal from circulation. Similarly, the FX series Atlanta aired an episode titled "Work Ethic!" that many interpreted as a commentary on Perry's production practices and creative control.

In 2020, Perry revealed that he writes all of his scripts independently without a writers' room. This approach drew criticism from some industry professionals who argued that it limits opportunities for emerging Black writers. Perry defended his method, citing past challenges with both union and non-union writers and emphasizing his desire to maintain a consistent creative voice.

Despite these critiques, Perry has received support from various commentators. Goldie Taylor, writing for TheGrio and speaking on NPR, noted that while Perry's work may not resonate with everyone, it connects deeply with many African Americans. Sociologist Shayne Lee, in an editorial for The Huffington Post, described Perry as one of the most innovative filmmakers of his time, highlighting his unique ability to blend spiritual themes with popular entertainment.

== Personal life ==
=== Family and relationships ===
On December 8, 2009, Perry's mother, Willie Maxine Perry, died at age 64, following an illness.

On November 30, 2014, Perry's then-partner, Gelila Bekele, gave birth to their son, Aman. In December 2020, Perry announced that he was a bachelor.

On March 7, 2021, Prince Harry, Duke of Sussex and Meghan, Duchess of Sussex publicly revealed in the television interview Oprah with Meghan and Harry that Perry provided initial security and housing for three months that allowed the couple to relocate safely from Canada to California in March 2020, following the withdrawal of their British royal protection. Perry is also godfather to their daughter, Princess Lilibet of Sussex.

Perry is good friends with Janet Jackson, Will Smith, and Oprah Winfrey.

=== Residences ===
Perry lives and works in Southwest Atlanta, where he operates the Tyler Perry film and TV studios.

In 2007, Perry bought a 17-acre (7 ha) estate in the Paces neighborhood of Buckhead, Atlanta. In May 2016, he sold the house for $17.5 million, also closing the biggest deal ever for a private home in the Georgia capital.

In August 2010, it was reported that Perry had purchased Dean Gardens, a 58-acre (23 ha) estate in the Atlanta suburb of Johns Creek. He tore down the existing 32,000-square-foot (3,000 m^{2}) mansion and planned, but never built, a new, environmentally friendly home on the property.

In 2013, Perry's company, ETPC LLC, purchased around 1,100 acres (4.5 km^{2}) in the New Manchester, Georgia area of Douglas County, Georgia.

In September 2017, Perry purchased a house in Mulholland Estates, a gated community in Los Angeles. Nine months after buying the estate, Perry sold the property for $15.6 million.

Perry owns vacation properties in both Wyoming and The Bahamas.

Perry owns a 2,100-acre (8.5 km^{2}) estate in Douglasville, Georgia, including a 40,000-square-foot (3,700 m^{2}) châteauesque house, and an airstrip.

In September 2026, Perry announced that he was "pulling a lot back" from his work and going to live primarily with his son in Puerto Rico.

=== Mental health ===
Following the death of Stephen "tWitch" Boss, Perry uploaded a video to his Instagram account where he spoke about his own struggles with depression, and revealed he had attempted suicide several times before his career took off.

=== Beliefs and interests ===
Perry is a Christian. Many of the themes in his work reflect theology and social behavior indicative of the predominantly black church culture, such as the many scenes in both his stage and screen work that feature church settings and worship styles commonly found in predominantly African American churches, including showcases of gospel music and artists.

On July 20, 2009, Perry sponsored 65 children from a Philadelphia day camp to visit Walt Disney World, after reading that a suburban swim club, the Valley Swim Club in Huntingdon Valley, Pennsylvania, had shunned them. He wrote on his website, "I want them to know that for every act of evil that a few people will throw at you, there are millions more who will do something kind for them."

To overcome his fear of flying, Perry took flight training lessons and obtained a student pilot certificate (listed under "EMMITT PERRY JR" as of August 31, 2026). He flies a Cirrus SR22T aircraft. As a hobby, he also flies large-scale radio-controlled aircraft.

== Legal issues ==
=== The Writers Guild of America West ===
The Writers Guild of America West filed unfair labor practice charges with the National Labor Relations Board (NLRB), alleging that Perry's production company, Tyler Perry Studios, unlawfully fired four writers in October 2008 in retaliation for them trying to get a union contract. The dispute was settled a month later, when TPS agreed to be a WGA signatory.

=== Mo' Money Taxes ===
In early 2009, Perry threatened legal action against Mo' Money Taxes, a tax preparation company based in Memphis, Tennessee, for running a TV spot that he felt offensively parodied his work, in particular Madea Goes to Jail. The ad features a large white male (John Cowan) in drag, named "Ma'Madea". The offending ad was dropped from circulation.

=== Sexual assault lawsuits ===
On June 13, 2025, Derek Dixon, an actor in some of Perry's productions including The Oval, filed a lawsuit against Perry that accused Perry of committing numerous acts of sexual assault and sexual battery against him since 2021. According to the lawsuit which was filed against Perry in the Los Angeles County Superior Court, Dixon alleged that Perry had "been using his power and influence to molest, abuse, and sexually assault impressionable and vulnerable employees and actors who look to him for guidance and mentorship while pursuing their dreams". Dixon has requested Perry to pay $260 million in damages, and to have a trial by jury. It was also revealed that Dixon had previously filed an Equal Employment Opportunity Commission (EEOC) sexual harassment complaint against Perry in 2024, and then departed from The Oval after the complaint failed to result in the show's producers taking any action.

On December 25, 2025, Mario Rodriguez, an actor who appeared in Boo! A Madea Halloween, filed a sexual battery lawsuit against both Perry and Lionsgate for $77 million in California state court. Rodriguez alleged Perry subjected him to unwanted sexual advances, which included an occasion in 2018 where Perry "tightly hugged" him and "grabbed his penis." Rodriguez alleged Perry made unwanted advances towards him while he was being cast in the film and shortly after filming was complete in 2016. Rodriguez further alleged that Perry behaved inappropriately toward him again after they got back in touch with one another in 2018. Rodriguez's claims against Perry include not only sexual battery, but also sexual assault and intentional infliction of emotional distress. Rodriguez further alleged that Lionsgate, which distributed Boo! A Madea Halloween, turned a blind eye towards Perry’s alleged misconduct. Text messages shown to the Associated Press (AP) revealed that Rodriguez stayed in contact with Perry for longer than stated in his lawsuit, where it was stated that he had stopped speaking to Perry in 2019. In messages from 2024 and 2025, Rodriguez contacted Perry "expressing gratitude, friendship and financial distress". Rodriguez responded to the story stating that the "text messages were sent to Perry at a time" when he was "especially vulnerable as can be seen from the context."

== Filmography ==
=== Film work ===
Year	Film	Credited as				
Year	Film	Director	Writer	Producer	Actor	Role
2005	Diary of a Mad Black Woman	No	Yes	Yes	Yes	Madea, Joe, Brian
2006	Madea's Family Reunion	Yes	Yes	Yes	Yes	Madea, Joe, Brian
2007	Daddy's Little Girls	Yes	Yes	Yes	No	
2007	Why Did I Get Married?	Yes	Yes	Yes	Yes	Terry Bob
2008	Meet the Browns	Yes	Yes	Yes	Yes	Madea, Joe
2008	The Family That Preys	Yes	Yes	Yes	Yes	Ben
2009	Madea Goes to Jail	Yes	Yes	Yes	Yes	Madea, Joe, Brian
2009	Star Trek	No	No	No	Yes	Admiral Barnett
2009	I Can Do Bad All by Myself	Yes	Yes	Yes	Yes	Madea, Joe
2009	Precious	No	No	Yes	No	
2010	Why Did I Get Married Too?	Yes	Yes	Yes	Yes	Terry Bob
2010	For Colored Girls	Yes	Yes	Yes	No	
2011	Madea's Big Happy Family	Yes	Yes	Yes	Yes	Madea, Joe
2012	Good Deeds	Yes	Yes	Yes	Yes	Wesley Deeds
2012	Madea's Witness Protection	Yes	Yes	Yes	Yes	Madea, Joe, Brian
2012	Alex Cross	No	No	No	Yes	Alex Cross
2013	Temptation: Confessions of a Marriage Counselor	Yes	Yes	Yes	No	
2013	Peeples	No	No	Yes	No	
2013	A Madea Christmas	Yes	Yes	Yes	Yes	Madea
2014	The Single Moms Club	Yes	Yes	Yes	Yes	TK
2014	Gone Girl	No	No	No	Yes	Tanner Bolt
2015	Madea's Tough Love	No	No	Yes	Yes	Madea, Joe, Brian (voices)
2016	Teenage Mutant Ninja Turtles: Out of the Shadows	No	No	No	Yes	Dr. Baxter Stockman
2016	Brain on Fire	No	No	No	Yes	Richard
2016	Boo! A Madea Halloween	Yes	Yes	Yes	Yes	Madea, Joe, Brian
2017	The Star	No	No	No	Yes	Cyrus the Camel (voice)
2017	Boo 2! A Madea Halloween	Yes	Yes	Yes	Yes	Madea, Joe, Brian
2018	Acrimony	Yes	Yes	Yes	No	
2018	Nobody's Fool	Yes	Yes	Executive	No	
2018	Vice	No	No	No	Yes	Colin Powell
2019	A Madea Family Funeral	Yes	Yes	Yes	Yes	Madea, Joe, Brian, Heathrow
2020	A Fall from Grace	Yes	Yes	Executive	Yes	Rory Garraux
2021	Those Who Wish Me Dead	No	No	No	Yes	Officer Arthur Phillip
2021	Paw Patrol: The Movie	No	No	No	Yes	Truck Driver (voice)
2021	Don't Look Up	No	No	No	Yes	Jack Bremmer
2022	A Madea Homecoming	Yes	Yes	Executive	Yes	Madea, Joe
2022	A Jazzman's Blues	Yes	Yes	Yes	No	
2024	Mea Culpa	Yes	Yes	Yes	No	
2024	Divorce in the Black	Yes	Yes	Yes	No	
2024	The Six Triple Eight	Yes	Yes	Yes	No	
2025	Tyler Perry's Duplicity	Yes	Yes	Yes	No	
2025	Straw	Yes	Yes	Yes	No	
2025	Madea's Destination Wedding	Yes	Yes	Yes	Yes	Madea, Joe, Brian
2025	Ruth & Boaz	No	No	Yes	No	
2025	Finding Joy	Yes	Yes	Yes	No	
2026	Joe's College Road Trip	Yes	Yes	Yes	Yes	Madea, Joe, Brian
2026	Why Did I Get Married Again?	Yes	Yes	Yes	Yes	Terry Bob
2026	Doing Life	Yes	Yes	Yes	No	
2026	The Gospel of Christmas	Yes	Yes	Yes	No	
2026	Give Me Some Sugah	No	No	Yes	No	
2026	Strung	No	No	Yes	No	

=== Television work ===
Year	Show	Credited as				
Year	Show	Director	Writer	Producer	Actor	Role
2007–2012, 2020–present	House of Payne	Yes	Yes	Yes	Yes	Madea
2009–2011	Meet the Browns	Yes	Yes	Yes	No	
2011–2017	For Better or Worse	Yes	Yes	Yes	No	
2013–2017	Love Thy Neighbor	Yes	Yes	Yes	Yes	Madea
2013–2021	The Haves and the Have Nots	Yes	Yes	Yes	No	
2014–2020	If Loving You Is Wrong	Yes	Yes	Yes	No	
2016	The Passion: New Orleans	No	No	No	Yes	Host/Narrator
2016–2017	Too Close to Home	Yes	Yes	Yes	No	
2018	The Paynes	Yes	Yes	Yes	No	
2019–present	The Oval	Yes	Yes	Yes	No	
2019–present	Sistas	Yes	Yes	Yes	No	
2020–2025	Young Dylan	Yes	Yes	Yes	No	
2020–present	Ruthless	Yes	Yes	Yes	No	
2020–present	Bruh	Yes	Yes	Yes	No	
2020–present	Assisted Living	Yes	Yes	Yes	No	
2021–present	All the Queen's Men	Yes	Yes	Yes	No	
2022–present	Zatima	Yes	Yes	Yes	No	
2024	Perimeter	No	No	Yes	No	
2024–present	Beauty in Black	Yes	Yes	Yes	No	
2025	She the People	Yes	Yes	Yes	No	
2025	Divorced Sistas	Yes	Yes	Yes	No	
2025	Route 187	Yes	Yes	Yes	No	
2026	Where There’s Smoke	Yes	Yes	Yes	No	

== Stage work ==
Year	Play	Credited as				
Year	Play	Director	Writer	Producer	Actor	Role
1998	I Know I've Been Changed	Yes	Yes	No	Yes	Joe
1999	Woman, Thou Art Loosed!	Yes	Yes	Yes	Yes	The Rent Man
1999	I Can Do Bad All by Myself	Yes	Yes	Yes	Yes	Madea
2000	Behind Closed Doors	Yes	Yes	Yes	No	
2001	Diary of a Mad Black Woman	Yes	Yes	Yes	Yes	Daddy Charles / Madea
2002	Madea's Family Reunion	Yes	Yes	Yes	Yes	Madea
2003	Madea's Class Reunion	Yes	Yes	Yes	Yes	Dr. Willie Leroy Jones / Madea
2003	Why Did I Get Married?	Yes	Yes	Yes	No	
2004	Meet the Browns	Yes	Yes	Yes	No	Madea (voice only)
2004	Madea's Christmas	Yes	Yes	Yes	Yes	Madea
2005	Madea Goes to Jail	Yes	Yes	Yes	Yes	Madea
2006	What's Done in the Dark	Yes	Yes	Yes	No	
2008	The Marriage Counselor	Yes	Yes	Yes	No	
2009	Laugh to Keep from Crying	Yes	Yes	Yes	No	
2010	Madea's Big Happy Family	Yes	Yes	Yes	Yes	Madea
2011	A Madea Christmas	Yes	Yes	Yes	Yes	Madea
2011	Aunt Bam's Place	Yes	Yes	Yes	No	
2011	I Don't Want to Do Wrong	Yes	Yes	Yes	No	
2012	The Haves and the Have Nots	Yes	Yes	Yes	No	
2012	Madea Gets a Job	Yes	Yes	Yes	Yes	Madea
2013	Hell Hath No Fury Like a Woman Scorned	Yes	Yes	Yes	No	
2013	Madea's Neighbors from Hell	Yes	Yes	Yes	Yes	Madea
2017	Madea on the Run	Yes	Yes	Yes	Yes	Madea
2019	Madea's Farewell Play	Yes	Yes	Yes	Yes	Madea
2026	Joe Turner's Come and Gone					

== See also ==
- African-American upper class
- Black billionaires
- Black elite
- Disappearances of Terrance Williams and Felipe Santos – Tyler Perry offered a $200,000 reward for information in the case and has worked to raise publicity for it.
