= Erakat =

Erakat, Erekat, Erikat, Arekat, Arikat, Areikat, Ereiqat or Uraygat (Arabic: عريقات, romanized: ʿUrayqāt, Palestinian Arabic: ʿRēqāt) is a Palestinian surname. Notable people with the surname include:

- Ahmad Erekat (1993–2020), Palestinian man killed by Israeli police
- Kamel Arekat (1901–1984), Palestinian-Jordanian militant and politician
- Maen Rashid Areikat (born 1960), Palestinian diplomat
- Noura Erakat (born 1980), Palestinian-American lawyer and human rights activist
- Saeb Erekat (1955–2020), Palestinian diplomat
- Said Arikat (born 1947/48), Palestinian journalist
- Yousef Erakat (born 1990), Palestinian-American YouTube personality
