= Palestine: A Socialist Introduction =

2020 book by Sumaya Awad

- Author: Sumaya Awad and Brian Bean
- Publisher: Haymarket Books
- Publication date: December 1, 2020
- Pages: 250
- ISBN: 9-781-64259276-4

Palestine: A Socialist Introduction is a 2020 essay collection about the historical context of the Palestinian struggle for liberation and its relationship to socialism, edited by Sumaya Awad and brian bean.

== Synopsis ==
After an introductory chapter and a brief timeline, Palestine: A Socialist Introduction is grouped into three parts: "Circumstances Given and Transmitted from the Past", "The Road to Jerusalem Goes through Cairo", and "Workers of the World, Unite," each containing three essays.

"Circumstances Given and Transmitted from the Past" lays out the historical context and roots of the struggle today, first detailing the Nakba, the ethnic cleansing of Palestinians beginning in 1948, and the political ideology behind Zionism in the essay "Roots of the Nakba: Zionist Settler Colonialism" by Sumaya Awad and Annie Levin. The second essay, "How Israel Became the Watchdog State: US Imperialism and the Middle East" by Shireen Akram-Boshar, explains how US imperialism is deeply invested in support for Israel. The third essay in this section, "The National Liberation Struggle: A Socialist Analysis" by Mostafa Omar, describes the historical context of the Palestinian liberation movement between the Nakba and the Second Intifada, a five-year Palestinian uprising in the early 2000s.

"The Road to Jerusalem Goes through Cairo" focuses on the current (as of the book's publication in 2020) players in the struggle. "Not an Ally: The Israeli Working Class" by Daphna Thier, an Israeli anti-Zionist author, argues that the Israeli working class is not an ally of liberation due to their ties to Israel's settler-colonialism. Next, in Toufic Haddad's essay "The Price of 'Peace' on Their Terms", the history of neoliberalist influence on the peace process. The final essay in this section, "Palestine in Tahrir" by Jehad Abusalim, unpacks how the Arab Spring has shaped where the world- and Palestine- is now.

"Workers of the World, Unite," discusses the important dynamic of global solidarity. BDS movement, the historical connection between Palestine and the Black liberation struggle in the United States, and the intersection of feminism and Palestine. This section features three essays: "What Palestinians Ask of Us: The Boycott, Divestment, and Sanctions Movement" by Omar Barghouti, Sumaya Awad, and brian bean; "Multiple Jeopardy: Gender and Liberation in Palestine" by Nada Elia; and "Cops Here, Bombs There: Black-Palestinian Solidarity" by Khury Petersen-Smith.

The conclusion connects these three parts and aims to make the case for the liberation of Palestine, focusing on regional uprisings and global movements.

== Reception ==
Palestine: A Socialist Introduction is considered solid middle-introductory work to viewing the Palestinian struggle through a socialist lens. The Young Democratic Socialists of America lists this book in its recommended reading list about Imperialism and Internationalism. A review in New Politics called it "an important contribution both to newcomers to the issue of Palestine, and to long time activists and socialists concerned with strategy and tactics in the movement." Another review in Middle East Eye calls the essay collection "of vital importance" and states "the book makes an important contribution to the Palestine solidarity movement. By returning to the history of the Palestinian people’s struggle for return and liberation, the authors chart a course forward for us today."

The essay collection has also received positive reviews from:

- Noura Erakat, author of Justice for Some: Law and the Question of Palestine
- Ahmed Abu Artema, Palestinian journalist and peace activist
- Ilan Pappé, Israeli-British historian and author of Ten Myths About Israel
- Tithi Bhattacharya, Indian activist and co-author of Feminism for the 99%: A Manifesto

One critic of the book claims it was too advanced to be considered an introduction, stating "Almost every chapter went over my head. When the authors aren’t discussing events with the assumption that their readers have already studied them, they are using advanced political language that the everyday reader would struggle to grasp," but conceded "<the book> told me what I didn’t know, and what I need to learn." A review in Viewpoint Magazine takes issue with the perceived dismissal of Palestinian Marxism in favor of the book's primary thesis, specifically taking issue with the essay "The National Liberation Struggle: A Socialist Analysis."
