= Killing and dismemberment of Muhammad al-Na'im =

2020 killing and dismemberment in the Gaza Strip

Mohammad Ali Hasan al-Na'im (also translit: al-Na'em; Arabic: محمد علي حسن النعيم) was a 27-year-old Palestinian militant from Gaza who was killed by Israeli soldiers near the Israel–Gaza fence in an agricultural field east of Abasan al-Saghira at around 5:40 am on February 23, 2020. The killing gained notoriety because of footage of an Israeli army bulldozer mutilating and dismembering the body as it tried to snatch it.

== The incident ==
According to Israeli sources, two Palestinian men approached the fence east of Khan Younis with the intention of placing an improvised explosive device near it. Israeli troops observing them fired three artillery shells and opened fire, killing al-Na'im and wounding his accomplice. According to Palestinian sources, al-Na'im was killed 100 to 200 meters from the fence.

Palestinians nearby, acting as first responders, made several attempts to evacuate the body but were driven back by Israeli fire.

Eventually, an armored bulldozer protected by a Merkava tank was sent through a gate in the fence to snatch al-Na'im's body. At the same time, three Palestinians, Muhammad Khaled Al-Najjar, 19, Ahmad Samir Al-Najjar, 20, and Mu'taz Hassan Al-Najjar, 21, made another attempt to evacuate the body but the bulldozer sped towards them and they were fired on by the soldiers. Muhammad and Mu'taz were shot in their legs and they had to abandon their evacuation attempt. According to Mu'taz's affidavit, the trio signaled to the soldiers that they were civilians:

"We took off our upper clothes, remaining in our undershirts, and took a stretcher. We advanced towards the person lying on the ground, while raising our hands in the air to show the soldiers we were civilians. We walked about 40 metres when the occupying soldiers fired several bullets towards us. I could hear the sound of bullets buzzing near us and saw sand flying around us. We lay flat on the ground for a moment, then got up again and continued to advance until we reached the person lying on the ground. When we reached him, I saw that he lay motionless and that he had been injured in his head, face, and different parts of his body. His guts were outside his stomach and his body was covered in blood. I saw another injured person lying some 15 metres away. We put him on the stretcher and transported him for a distance of 20 metres. At that moment, Israeli soldiers opened fire at us, so we stumbled and [the individual on the stretcher] fell to the ground."

The bulldozer ran over the corpse then scooped it up with its plow and swung it in the air before carrying it to the Israeli side of the border. According to al-Najjar, a journalist based in Gaza, who filmed the incident: "The bulldozer made several failed attempts to violently snatch his body with its blade only, until it mutilated the body and dismembered parts of it." and "People managed to retrieve parts of his legs, which the family buried." According to Alaa Qdeih's witness affidavit, cited by Al Mezan, the bulldozer remained for three minutes and the tank for 20 after which he and others collected remaining body parts:

"I saw the bulldozer advancing and running over the body. The youth that tried to evacuate him then retreated towards Jakar Street. Then, I saw the bulldozer trying to lift the man with its blade and dropping him on the ground several times. This continued for about three minutes amid sporadic shooting from the Israeli occupying soldiers. Then, the bulldozer lifted him from his shirt with the rake of its blade. It was clear that he was motionless and his body was dangling. It was a horrible sight. [The bulldozer] dragged him to the other side of the fence. The tank remained in the area for about 20 minutes before it also withdrew to the other side of the fence. Once the [Israeli] forces withdrew, a number of the youth and I headed towards the area and found body parts from the person's head. We collected the remains and took them to the ambulance."

Al-Na'im was identified as a member of the Al-Quds Brigades, the military wing of the Islamic Jihad. He was survived by his wife Hiba, his son Hamza and his mother Mirvat.

== Responses ==
Al-Najjar's and others footage showing the body dangling from the Israeli army bulldozers blade spread on social media and caused and outrage in Gaza. Islamic Jihad fired rockets and Israel responded with several airstrikes on Gaza and Syria, injuring four Palestinians and killing two members of the Al-Quds brigades in Damascus; Ziad Ahmad Mansour, 23 and Salim Ahmad Salim, 24.

Hamas spokesperson Fawzi Barhoum said in a statement: "The Zionist occupation’s deliberate killing of an innocent young man along the perimeter of the Gaza Strip and its maltreatment of his corpse in plain sight is another heinous crime that has been added to its record of awful crimes at the expense of our Palestinian people" and promised retaliation.

Israel's Defense Minister Naftali Bennett praised the military's handling of the incident, tweeting "I give my backing to the IDF that eliminated the terrorists and collected the body. That is what is needed and that is how we will act." He argued that bodies of Palestinians should be used as bargaining chip to negotiate the return of the bodies of Oron Shaul and Hadar Goldin, two Israeli soldiers killed by Hamas during the 2014 Gaza war. Aida Touma-Sliman a Palestinian Member of Knesset (MK) of the Joint List called Bennett "the minister of death and brutality". Ofer Cassif a Jewish MK of the same party called the abduction of the body an "nauseating, blood-thirsty act of vampirism." According to Al Mezan, Israel has withheld the bodies of 58 Palestinians since April 2016.

Adalah, the Legal Center for Arab Minority Rights in Israel, stated that "actions depicted in the video [are] war crimes and blatant violations of international criminal law, and international human rights and humanitarian law" and demanded that the military would open a criminal investigation.

On March 2, 2020, Al Mezan and several other human rights organizations involved in the Israeli–Palestinian conflict sent a joint letter to the United Nations special rapporteur on the desecration of al-Na'im's body and on the injury of the youths trying to evacuate it.

Al-Na'im's mother Mirvat demanded that Israel would return the body of her son.

== See also ==
- List of violent incidents in the Israeli–Palestinian conflict, 2020
- List of Palestinian rocket attacks on Israel in 2020
