= Timeline of the Israeli–Palestinian conflict in 2020 =

The following is a timeline of events during the Israeli–Palestinian conflict in 2020.

== January ==
=== 15 January ===
Israel carried out several airstrikes on Gaza, including Jabalia, in response to four rockets fired from the enclave. Two of the rockets were shot down by the Iron Dome air defense system and two landed in uninhabited areas. No injuries were reported on either side.

=== 19 January ===
- One farmer, Mahdi Eid Ayyad Irmeilat, 36, and another was injured in two separate explosions near Rafah in southern Gaza. Palestinian sources attributed the explosions to undetonated ordnance dropped by Israeli soldiers.

=== 21 January ===
- Three Palestinian youth, Mohammad Hani Abu Mandeel, Salem Zuweid an-Na'ami and Mahmoud Khaled Sa'id from Maghazi refugee camp in Gaza, all 17 or 18-years-old, were shot dead by Israeli soldiers near the Israel–Gaza barrier in the northern Gaza. According to the Israeli army, the trio had managed to cross the fence and 400 meters into Israeli territory. There they threw either a grenade or an explosive device at Israeli soldiers who killed them.

=== 24 January ===
A mosque in the Beit Safafa neighborhood of East Jerusalem was torched and the walls spray-painted with Hebrew graffiti. Israeli police suspected that it was a price tag attack carried out by extremist settlers from the Kumi Ori outpost in the northern West Bank.

=== 25 January ===
- Two Palestinians from As-Sawiya, a father and his son, were attacked by a group of settlers from the settlement Rehelim armed with rocks and an iron rod while working their land. They were hospitalized for their injuries in Nablus.

== February ==
=== 5 February ===
- Mohammed al-Haddad, 16 or 17, was shot dead by Israeli forces during clashes in the Bab al-Zawiya neighborhood in Hebron. IDF spokesperson said al-Haddad hurled a Molotov cocktail at them.

=== 6 February ===
- Israeli soldiers with bulldozers entered Jenin in the northern West Bank in order to destroy the home of Palestinian prisoner Ahmad Qunba, who was convicted of killing an Israeli settler in a drive-by shooting in January 2018. Confrontations between the soldiers and the locals erupted. Palestinian snipers fired at the soldiers, causing them to fire at the protestors. Yazan Munther Khaled Abu Tabikh, 19, was shot dead and six other Palestinians sustained injures and were taken to a hospital. One of them in critical condition.
- A Palestinian Authority policeman, Tariq Ahmad Luay Badwan, 24, was shot in his stomach while inside Jenin's police station. He later succumbed to his wounds. Video evidence appeared to show Badwan standing at the entrance to the station and not posing a threat when he was shot.
- Israeli Border Police shot and killed Shadi Banna, 45, a Palestinian citizen of Israel, at the gate of the Temple Mount in Jerusalem.
- A Palestinian gunman, Fakhr Abu Ziyad Qarat, 51, shot at Israeli soldiers near Ramallah injuring one in the head. The soldiers fired at the gunman who fled. His body was found on 17 February near Ras Karkar.
- At least 14 people, most of them Israeli soldiers, were injured in a car-ramming attack in Jerusalem. One of them was in serious condition. The driver fled the scene. Hamas hailed the attack as a "practical response" to the Trump peace plan.

=== 7 February ===
Badr Nedal Nafla, 19 or 20, was shot and killed during clashes with Israeli soldiers in Qaffin northeast of Tulkarem in the West Bank after he allegedly threw a Molotov cocktail at them.

=== 11 February ===
The tires of 170 cars were slashed and anti-Palestinian graffiti was spray-painted on the walls of a mosque in the northern Palestinian town Jish in Israel. Prime Minister Benjamin Netanyahu denounced the suspected price tag attack.

=== 15 February ===
- A nine-year-old Palestinian Boy, Malik Eissa, was shot in the face by Israeli police and lost vision in his left eye after allegedly partaking in riots in East Jerusalem. Residents claim he was on his way home from school.

=== 16 February ===
Israeli warplanes struck targets in Gaza overnight. IDF said the airstrikes were in response to two rockets fired from the enclave which landed in open fields. No injures were reported on either side.

=== 22 February ===
- Israeli police shot and killed Maheer Zatara, 33, near the Lions' Gate in East Jerusalem after he allegedly approached an officer with a knife.

=== 23 February ===
Mohammad Ali Hasan an-Na’em, 27, a member of the Al-Quds Brigades was shot and killed by Israeli soldiers east of Khan Yunis. According to Israeli sources, soldiers observed two Palestinians placing an explosive device near the Israel–Gaza barrier and they, therefore, opened fire at them, killing Mohammad and wounding his accomplice. Bystanders tried to evacuate Mohammad's body, but an Israeli armored vehicle sped towards them, ran over the body, then scooped it up using its plow and swung it in the air. The desecration of the body was caught on video, spread through social media and caused outrage. Aida Touma-Suleiman an Israeli Member of Knesset for the Arab-Israeli party Joint List said that the Israelis "steal a body, abuse it with a bulldozer, and still argue that the army is the most moral in the world." Adalah demanded that the Israeli military immediately open an investigation into the incident. Two more Palestinians were wounded while trying to evacuate the wounded.

=== 24 February ===
Ziad Ahmad Mansour, 23 and Salim Ahmad Salim, 24, two members of the Al-Quds Brigades, were killed by an Israeli air strike in Damascus, Syria.

=== 25 February ===
- Settlers slashed tires of at least eight cars in Yasuf south of Nablus.
- Settlers sprayed graffiti on cars and walls in Salfit in central the West Bank.

== March ==
=== 11 March ===
- Mohammed Hamayel, 15, was shot dead by Israeli soldiers during a protest against Israeli settlements in Beita near Nablus in the West Bank and 18 more were injured. One of them was Islam Dweikat, 22, who fell into a coma and was pronounced dead on 1 April.

=== 22 March ===
- Israeli forces shot and killed a Palestinian and wounded another Ni'lin, Ramallah and al-Bireh Governorate in the central West Bank. According to PCHR, at approximately 22:00 Israeli soldiers stationed at the entrance of Ni'lin fired at a car driven by Sufian Nawaf 'Abed al-Haleem al-Khawaja, 31, killing him and wounding the passenger, his cousin Mohamed Bader al-Khawaja, 20. The wounded passenger fled and went to a hospital in Ramallah where he was treated. They were according to family members on their way home after having bought foodstuffs for their families. The Israeli military stated that they were throwing stones at Israeli vehicles. PCHR's fieldworker disputed the army's statement claiming that the Palestinians saw an Israeli police vehicle and for fear of being stopped because their car was illegal they turned away. PCHR claimed that the Israeli soldiers opened fire at the vehicle without any justification as they posed no threat or danger to anyone's lives.

=== 27 March ===
- The Israeli Air Force struck military facilities in northern Gaza and Palestinian militants in Gaza fired a rocket towards Israel.

== April ==
=== 6 April ===
- Israeli airplanes sprayed herbicide on agricultural lands in Gaza near the border fence, damaging crops.

=== 13 April ===
A group of masked Israeli settlers near Metzoke Dragot who had been ordered to self-quarantine due to the COVID-19 pandemic pepper-sprayed and threw stones at three Palestinian men. They also firebombed two cars.

=== 16 April ===
'Issa and Musa Qatash from Jalazon refugee camp, Ramallah Governorate were attacked and beaten by settlers. The assault on 'Issa resulted in a fractured bone and two broken front teeth. The settlers also spat at him which forced him into isolation due to fear of the coronavirus spreading.

=== 22 April ===
- Israeli authorities demolished six illegal structures built by settlers near the Yitzhar settlement in the northern West Bank.
- Ibrahim Muhammad Ali Halasa, 25, from al-Sawahira in the West Bank was shot dead after attempting to ram an Israeli Border Police officer with his van who he then chased after with a knife. The officer sustained minor injuries.
- A driver in a car with Palestinian license plates hit an Israeli Border Police officer and a civilian near the Ateret settlement. The driver fled the area.
- A Palestinian, 19, from Tulkarem stabbed an Israeli woman, 62, outside a store in Kfar Saba in Israel. The attacker was then shot by an Israeli civilian.

== May ==
=== 3 May ===
At around 6:45 am three Palestinian men from Dhinnaba, Tulkarm Governorate wanted to cross a gate in the Israeli West Bank barrier. Soldiers were supposed to arrive at 7:00 am and open the gate for them. No soldiers arrived and at 7:30 am the men gave up and decided to instead cross the barrier through a nearby opening. As soon as they did, soldiers lying in ambush opened fire at them with no warning. One of the Palestinians were shot in the leg and taken away by an ambulance.

=== 6 May ===
A Palestinian shepherd, Harbi Mohammed Ali Abdo, was hospitalized and in serious condition after being attacked by a group of about ten settlers while herding his flock near the evacuated settlement Homesh in the northern West Bank.

=== 7 May ===
At around 6:00 am a 39-year-old Palestinian from Tulkarem refugee camp tried to pass through an agricultural gate in the Israeli West Bank barrier near Far'on. He decided not to use his entry permit and instead tried to cross through an opening in the barrier. Soldiers lying in ambush fired on him and injured his right leg.

At 6:30 am two Palestinian, a 15-year-old boy and another youth tried to cross an opening in the barbed wire of the Israeli West Bank barrier to look for temporary work in Israel. While standing on the eastern side overlooking the barrier, a group of soldiers approached them in a jeep. One of them fled but the 15-year-old boy fell. One soldier started to kick him and the other hit him with a rifle butt causing him to blackout. Residents who had witnessed the incident came over and took the boy to a hospital in Tulkarem. There it was found that he had suffered a fractured right arm and abdominal hemorrhaging. He remained in care until he was discharged on 14 May.

=== 10 May ===
At around 7:00 am two Palestinians, one from Tulkarem and the other from Far'a refugee camp tried to cross through an opening in the Israeli West Bank barrier. Israeli soldiers lying in ambush fired at them injuring both in their legs. They were given first aid by the soldiers and then taken to the al-Kafriyat checkpoint by ambulance and then to the Thabet Thabet hospital in Tulkarem.

At around 8:00 am Jewish settlers near Turmus Ayya, Ramallah Governorate harassed two Palestinian tractor drivers, Suliman 'Asfur, 27, and Yusef Muzahem, 38. The settlers tried to prevent them from working their lands according to B'Tselem's report:

One settler tried to pull 'Asfur out of his tractor but slipped and started screaming in pain, pretending he had been run over. Minutes later, the same settler sprayed Muzahem in the face with pepper spray while he was driving. The settler again laid down pretending he had been run over by Muzahem's tractor. A settlement security coordinator seeing the settler laying down threw two stun grenades at the Palestinian tractor drivers. 'Asfur who was arguing with one of the settlers got into his tractor and tried to get away. The security coordinator chased him and pulled his gun, threatening to shoot him if he didn't stop. 'Asfur complied and the security coordinator ordered him to sit on the ground and he then called the Israeli police and military. Border police arrived, handcuffed and blindfolded 'Asfur and took him to the Geva Binyamin police station.

Muzahem who had been pepper-sprayed went to the Geva Binyamin police station to file a report. he waited until 5:00 pm to file his report.

'Asfur was released after ten days in custody after the agricultural committee he was working for paid his bail of 4,000 NIS.

=== 12 May ===
- Israeli soldier Amit Ben Yigal was killed during a raid in Ya'bad in the Jenin Governorate, West Bank by Nazmi Abu Bakr, 49, who threw a large stone at his head from a nearby rooftop.

=== 13 May ===
- Zeid Qaysiyah, 15 or 17, was shot in the head during clashes with Israeli forces in the Beit Jibrin neighborhood of the Fawwar refugee camp in the Hebron Governorate, West Bank. Four other youths were shot.

=== 14 May ===
- Bahaeddin Mohammad Abdullah al-'Awawda, 18, from Deir Samit, Hebron Governorate was shot and killed near Beit Awwa after he reportedly tried to ram a group of Israeli soldiers with his car, moderately wounding one.

=== 21 May ===
- Two Palestinians were injured after a group of settlers attacked a home in Yatma near Nablus in the West Bank. One suffered a broken leg.
- Settlers threw rocks along a main road near the settlement Yitzhar, leading to clashes with Palestinians from Hawara. A number of Palestinian cars and stores were damaged. One Palestinian was detained by police who arrived at the scene.

=== 25 May ===
Two Palestinians were shot by Israeli soldiers outside Turmus Ayya, Ramallah Governorate near the Havat Amichai outpost near the Shiloh settlement in the northern West Bank. According to B'Tselem's investigation, the shooting was unprovoked:

At around 9:00 am eight members of the Abu 'Alia family went to their fields to harvest clover. A settler and three Israeli soldiers drove up to them in a white jeep. With their weapons drawn they ordered the Palestinians to kneel. 'Imad Abu ‘Alia, 39, was pepper-sprayed in the face after asking them why. Two soldiers opened fire hitting 'Imad in the left thigh and Murad Abu 'Alia in the waist. The soldiers forbade the family from calling an ambulance. After 15 minutes they were allowed to take the injured men to a hospital.

The IDF claimed that the two Palestinians had attempted to stab the soldiers. When a journalist asked why the alleged attackers were allowed to check themselves into a hospital if they had just tried to carry out a stabbing attack, the IDF spokeswoman declined to comment.

=== 29 May ===
Fadi Adnan Samara Qa'd, 37, was shot and killed by Israeli soldiers. According to information obtained by the PCHR, Qa'd was en route to al-Saweya in Salfit to pick up his family. Near Nabi Saleh northwest of Ramallah, he met a group of soldiers around 16:30 who ordered him to stop. Qa'd lost control of his vehicle and it collided with a wooden bench, in the opposite direction of where the soldiers stood. The soldiers opened fire at Qa'd's car and wounded him. Qa'd was not given medical attention and left to bleed for two and a half hours before being taken away by an Israeli vehicle. According to Israeli authorities, Qa'd had tried to ram the soldiers. In response to the incident, dozens of Palestinians from Nabi Saleh gathered and threw stones at soldiers stationed in the nearby area. One Palestinian, Ahmed Eyad al-Tamimi, 21, was shot in the leg in the clashes.

=== 30 May ===
Eyad al-Hallaq, a 32-year-old autistic Palestinian man, was shot and killed by Israeli Police after Halaq did not stop at the Lions' Gate checkpoint in Jerusalem after being ordered to do so by officers stationed nearby.

== June ==
=== 10 June ===
At around 4:00 pm, Muhammad Bader, 26, a resident of Tel Rumeidah in Hebron was beaten by a group of four settlers. Bader noticed the settlers trying to grab a cart one of his neighbors uses and told them to leave it alone. The settlers turned their attention to Bader and began to beat him. One of them pulled an object out of his pocket and punched Bader in the face with it, breaking his nose. Bader and his father tried to chase the settlers but were cut off by a nearby soldier.

Later that day, at around 10:00 pm, Bader's brother Ibrahim Bader, 31, was also attacked by settlers after he crossed the Bab a-Zawiya checkpoint. A group of eight settlers showed up and started to beat him. An Israeli soldier stationed at the checkpoint tried to help Ibrahim but found it hard to do so.

=== 23 June ===
Ahmad Erekat, 26, was shot dead by Israeli Border Police officers, at a checkpoint outside Bethlehem. Ahmad Erekat was the nephew of Saeb Erakat. According to a report from Forensic Architecture, the killing amounted to an extrajudicial execution.

=== 25 June ===
While Muhammad Rubo'a's, 27, was driving home in the evening in this car, a group of settlers ran up to it at the Duma junction, Nablus Governorate and smashed the windshield with a large stone. Muhammad braked hard in fright and hit his head on the steering wheel.

=== 26 June ===
At around 1:30 pm a group of soldiers in Hebron, Hebron Governorate passed by a store owned by Faraj a-Natsheh, 51. One of them threw a tear-gas canister that fell by the entrance of the store with a-Natsheh inside. Minutes later, neighbors found him lying unconscious and called an ambulance which took him to a hospital. The day before he had asked a Palestinian not to undress in front of the same group of soldiers. A-Natsheh thought that was the reason why the soldiers threw the tear-gas canister:

I was sitting in my store at around 1:30 P.M when I saw the same soldiers pass by. One of them threw a tear-gas canister towards the front door and the gas started spreading. I couldn't get out because of the gas. I started choking and fell down. Then I blacked out. I woke up in the 'Aliyah Governmental Hospital and found out that neighbors had called an ambulance that took me there. It was still hard for me to breathe. I was there for three hours and then they discharged me. I think the soldiers were paying me back for telling the young man not to undress the day before.

== July ==
=== 5 July ===
- Dahoud Hassan, 67, were shot by a group of armed settlers outside Biddya near Nablus.

=== 9 July ===
Late in the evening Ibrahim Abu Ya'qub, 34, was killed by Israeli soldiers near a military watchtower at the southern entrance of his home village Kifl Haris, Salfit Governorate in the West Bank.

According to B'Tselem's investigation, Abu Ya'qub was out on an evening stroll with his friend Haitham Hamed, 35, at around 10:00 pm. They had gone to a friend who lived about 300 meters south of the village to ask him to come along. But he wasn't home so they headed north back into the village. After walking about 100 meters, Abu Ya'qub was shot in the back by an Israeli soldier. The soldiers were, according to the military, firing at two 15-year-olds who were running after having thrown a Molotov cocktail at them. One of the teens was wounded by the soldiers' fire. The military claimed that soldiers provided aid to him and that they subsequently turned him over to the Palestinian Red Crescent.

Two Palestinians driving by immediately picked up Abu Ya'qub and drove him to a hospital in Salfit. After attempting to resuscitate him for hours he was pronounced dead. The bullet had hit Abu Ya'qub between the shoulder blades and had exited through his neck.

Abou Yaqoub was buried the next day in a funeral procession visited by hundreds of Palestinians. Both Ismail Haniyeh, the leader of Hamas, and Palestinian President Mahmoud Abbas extended their condolences to the Abu Yaqoub family.

Dozens of Jewish settlers slashed tires of twelve vehicles and sprayed racist slogans on the walls of several homes in Allubban near Nablus in the West Bank in a price tag attack.

=== 10 July ===
- Two Israeli Border Police officers were mildly injured in clashes with a group of Hilltop Youth settlers outside the Yitzhar settlement in the northern West Bank.

=== 18 July ===
- Two Palestinian cyclists were injured when settlers threw stones at them near the settlement Shilo on the West Bank.

=== 24 July ===
At least four Palestinians were injured by Israeli soldiers during weekly protests in Kafr Qaddum near Qalqilia in the northern West Bank. The protestors demanded that the Israeli authorities should reopen the village's main road which was shut down in 2002. Two of the Palestinians were shot and two fell while being chased by soldiers.

=== 25 July ===
- Jewish settlers entered agricultural land near the village of Huwara, south of Nablus in the West Bank, and set fire to Palestinian-owned olive and almond trees, according to local sources.

=== 27 July ===
- A mosque in Al Bireh in the West Bank was torched and vandalized in a price tag attack by Israeli settlers. Anti-Palestinian slogans were spray-painted on the walls of the mosque.

=== 31 July ===
Seven Palestinian youth were shot with rubber bullets in clashes with Israeli soldiers during the weekly Kafr Qaddum protests. Dozens more suffered tear-gas inhalation. The protestors demanded that the village main road to Nablus should be reopened by Israeli authorities.

== August ==
=== 3 August ===
Israeli warplanes struck several targets in southern and central Gaza overnight belonging to Hamas in response to one rocket being fired from the enclave, according to the Israeli military. No injuries were reported.

=== 4 August ===
Israeli settlers torched two Palestinian vehicles and wrote "Price tag" on walls in Fara'ata, Qalqilya Governorate in the northern West Bank. According to local sources, the settlers came from the nearby Havat Gilad settlement.

=== 6 August ===
Late in the evening, Israeli warplanes struck several targets in northern Gaza. According to Israeli media, the airstrikes were believed to be in retaliation for a number of incendiary balloons launched from the enclave earlier in the day.

=== 7 August ===
Dalia Ahmed Suleiman Samudi, 23, was killed overnight by Israeli fire during clashes between Israeli soldiers and Palestinian youth near Jenin. Samudi was in her home when she was hit by live fire which wounded her. She was rushed to a hospital where she died in intensive care. According to the Director of the Palestinian Red Crescent Society, Mahmoud al-Sa'adi, the ambulance trying to reach her house was fired on by soldiers. According to her family, she had tried to close the window to her house because of tear gas outside.

According to the Israeli army, a riot had erupted in the area where the troops were operating and they responded with "riot dispersal means". It said that Palestinian rioters threw rocks, explosive devices and fired live fire on the troops. Local residents disputed that and said that the youth had only thrown stones at the raiding soldiers.

During the weekly clashes between Palestinian protestors and Israeli soldiers in Kafr Qaddum near Qalqilia one Palestinian was shot with a rubber bullet in the leg and a number of others suffered tear-gas inhalation.

One Palestinian was shot in the face with a gas bomb by an Israeli soldier during a march in Turmus Ayya, Ramallah Governorate. Others suffered tear-gas inhalation.

=== 9 August ===
The Israeli army fired several artillery shells into farmland east of Deir al-Balah in central Gaza. According to local sources, the shells were fired from tanks in the Kissufim military base. According to Israeli sources, workers near the Israel–Gaza barrier had been fired on. No injuries were reported.

In the evening Israeli warplanes struck targets in northern Gaza, among them a Hamas observation post near Beit Hanoun. According to IDF sources, one or more incendiary balloons had been launched from Gaza earlier in the day and the airstrikes were in retaliation.

A Palestinian man driving on the Nablus-Qalqilya road suffered moderate injuries as settlers threw stones at Palestinian cars driving near Burin in the northern West Bank. Ghassan Daghlas, an official monitoring settler activity, thought that the settlers came from the nearby Yitzhar settlement.

=== 12 August ===
Masked Israeli settler youth clashed with Israeli Border Police as they were dismantling three wooden structures near the Yitzhar settlement, Nablus Governorate in the northern West Bank. According to Israeli sources, the settlers punctured several vehicle tires, threw stones and used pepper spray against the police officers.

During the night of 13 August, Israeli helicopter gunships and tanks attacked at least three sites in Gaza. According to Palestinian sources, Israel struck two Hamas observation posts in central Gaza and agricultural land east of Rafah in southern Gaza. Israel said the airstrikes were retaliation for a number of balloons carrying incendiary devices that had been launched from Gaza and caused fires in southern Israel the previous days.

=== 13 August ===
According to Ghassan Daghlas, a Palestinian Authority official who monitors settler activity in the area, Israeli settlers set fire to agricultural lands in Asira al-Qibliya south of Nablus in the northern West Bank. He also said that some 20 settlers snuck into the village and spray-painted graffiti and set fire to a bulldozer.

Israeli warplanes, helicopters and tanks attacked Gaza. According to the Israeli military, a military compound, underground infrastructure and observations posts ostensibly belonging to Hamas were struck. Hamas "naval force" was also hit, it said. The strikes were in retaliation to incendiary balloons launched from the enclave in the past week which Israel blames Hamas for. Israel also said that it would stop shipments of fuel into Gaza. The airstrikes caused damage to infrastructure and citizens' homes but no injuries.

=== 14 August ===
The Israeli navy opened fire towards Palestinian fishermen sailing off the coast of Beit Lahia in northern Gaza. One fisherman was hit and injured by rubber bullets.

=== 15 August ===
For the fourth night in a row, Israel struck Hamas targets in Gaza allegedly in response to incendiary balloons being flown from the enclave. Combat helicopters and tanks firing from Israel participated in the attack. According to Palestinian sources, two children, aged three and eleven, and a woman was injured in an attack on an area east of Bureij refugee camp. Another woman was injured in an attack on a location in Beit Hanoun in northern Gaza.

A Palestinian infiltrator citizen of Jenin stabbed a 30-year-old man in Rosh haAyin in Israel, critically injured him, and fled the scene. On 20 August the attacker was arrested by an israeli Yamam force.

=== 16 August ===
Suhair Ebeit, 35, was shot in the foot by Israeli forces as he tried to cross the Israeli West Bank barrier to find work in Israel west of Far'un in the northeastern West Bank. He was taken to a hospital and his condition was described as stable.

=== 17 August ===
Israeli artillery shelled Beit Hanon in the northern Gaza and a site east of Khan Younis in the southern Gaza. Property damage was reported but no injuries.

In the early morning 13 Palestinian vehicles were set ablaze in Beit Safafa south of Jerusalem in a suspected price tag attack.

In the morning a deaf and mute Palestinian man said to be 60 years old was shot in the leg by Israeli security forces at the Qalandia checkpoint between Jerusalem and Ramallah. According to the Israeli police, the man was walking in a vehicle only area and didn't stop walking when ordered to do so. They suspected that he was carrying a knife, which he wasn't. Joint List Member of Knesset Heba Yazbak slammed the guards who opened fire: "They shoot first and ask questions later."

In the evening, Israeli Border Police shot and killed a Palestinian man in Bab Huta near Haram al-Sharif in Jerusalem. According to the police, the man stabbed and lightly injured one of their men. The Palestinian was identified as Atallah Halasa, 20, from as-Sawahira ash-Sharqiya southeast of Jerusalem. Later in the evening, Israeli forces arrested his mother and two of his brothers.

=== 18 August ===
In the morning Israeli forces demolished a multi-storey residential building under construction in the predominantly Jabal al-Mukabber neighborhood of Jerusalem. The demolition sparked confrontations between Palestinian youth and the Israeli soldiers that escorted the bulldozers. During the clashes, a Palestinian man in his 20s, Mohammad Moammar Ja’abis, was shot in his chest and rushed to a hospital.

=== 19 August ===
Three Palestinians were wounded by live fire from Israeli forces during clashes in Deir Abu Mash'al west of Ramallah. One of them, Mohammad Matar, 16, later died of his wounds.

According to a report in Haaretz, Israeli soldiers from the Nahal Brigade planted three or more explosive devices outside Kafr Qaddum in the central West Bank shortly before midnight. The day after, a seven-year-old boy found one of the explosives and another was found by members of his family who threw stones at it to neutralize it. Photos of the explosive devices spread on social media and Israeli soldiers came and neutralized the third explosive. According to military sources, the explosives were meant to serve as deterrence but "after it was discovered that this could lead to injuries, forces worked to remove them from the area." "This is how armed gangs operate, not a regular army." the Israeli human rights organization B'Tselem said in a statement.

=== 20 August ===
Three rockets was launched from Gaza during the day. They however fell short of the border and landed within the enclave. Israel retaliated with several airstrikes on Gaza. Light damage, but no casualties were reported in Khan Yunis in Southern Gaza.

=== 21 August ===
In the early morning, Israeli warplanes struck several sites in Gaza. Heavy destruction was caused to one site west of Gaza City as well as to nearby homes. Tanks stationed on the Israeli side of the border fired shells that struck farmland east of the City. One farmer was moderately injured east of Khan Younis. According to Palestinian sources, Palestinian militias retaliated by firing rockets towards Israel, three of which were intercepted by the Iron Dome missile defence system.

=== 24 August ===
In the early morning, Israeli warplanes and artillery struck several sites in Gaza. Among them a site northeast of Khan Younis and a site east of Rafah. No casualties were reported.

Late in the night an unexplained explosion east of Gaza City killed four Palestinians; two directly and two the next days from their injuries. The four Palestinians were identified as members of the Al-Quds Brigades and the explosion deemed to have been "an accident."

=== 26 August ===
Mamoun Qalalweh, 27, from the village Al-Judeida southwest of Jenin was shot in the leg by an Israeli soldier near an Israeli checkpoint according to local sources.

Early morning Israeli warplanes struck a site east of Khan Younis causing damages to houses but no injuries.

Khalil Abd al-Khaliq Dweikat, 46, from the northern West Bank stabbed orthodox rabbi Shai Ohayon, 39, to death in Segula Junction in Petah Tikva, Israel. He was apprehended at the scene by the police shortly after. Dweikat had a legal work permit in Israel and no prior history of political violence.

=== 28 August ===
Israeli warplanes and artillery struck several targets in Gaza causing property damage but no casualties.

According to Ghassan Daghlas, a Palestinian Authority official who monitors settler activity in the area, during the night, extremist settlers torched a vehicle and sprayed racist graffiti in Asira al-Qibliya, Nablus Governorate in the northern West Bank.

== September ==
=== 2 September ===
Jewish settlers threw stones on a car carrying four Palestinians near Turmus Ayya, northeast of Ramallah. The four passengers were wounded, among them a pregnant woman.

=== 5 September ===
Two Palestinian brothers were shot and then taken into custody by Israeli soldiers during a raid in Jenin in the northern West Bank.

=== 16 September ===
According to IDF, predawn, Gazan militants fired 13 rockets into Israel of which eight were intercepted by the Iron Dome, and Israeli warplanes and helicopters struck about ten locations in Gaza. Israeli sources said that a 62-year-old man was moderately injured and a 28-year-old man was lightly injured.

=== 18 September ===
A Palestinian dentist, Nedal Mohammad Jabarin, 54, died of a heart attack after Israeli soldiers fired stun grenades near Barta'a checkpoint to the southwest of Jenin in the northern West Bank.

A group of Israeli settlers from the Rechalim settlement chopped dozens of olive trees in As-Sawiya, Nablus Governorate in the northern West Bank, according to local sources.

=== 25 September ===
Two Gazan fishermen, the brothers Hasan and Mahmoud Al–Zazoua, were shot dead off the coast near Rafah by the Egyptian navy. A third brother, Yaser, was wounded and received treatment in Egypt.

== November ==
=== 6 November ===
73 Palestinians, including 41 children are displaced after the Bedouin village of Khirbet Humsa al-Fawqa is razed in the largest demolition in years. Palestinian Prime Minister Mohammad Shtayyeh accused Israel of timing the demolition for election day in the United States, when the world was distracted.

== December ==
=== 20 December ===
At noon a palestinian attacker murdered Ester Horgen, who went running in Rehan forest near her home in Tal Menasshe, with a stone. Her body was found at night and the attacker was caught about three days later.

== See also ==
- 2020 in Israel
- 2020 in the Palestinian territories
- List of Palestinian rocket attacks on Israel in 2020
- Timeline of the Israeli–Palestinian conflict
