= Mouin Rabbani =

Dutch-Palestinian political analyst

- Born: 10 July 1964 (age 62); Heerenveen, Netherlands
- Education: Tufts University (BA); Georgetown University (MA)
- Occupations: Journalist, analyst

Mouin Rabbani (Arabic: معين رباني) is a Dutch-Palestinian Middle East analyst specializing in the Arab-Israeli conflict and Palestinian affairs.

As of 2012, Rabbani was based in Amman, Jordan and was a Senior Analyst for the International Crisis Group, the Palestine Director of the Palestine American Research Center, a Project Director for the Association of Netherlands Municipalities, and a volunteer and General Editor for Al Haq. Rabbani was a senior fellow at the Institute for Palestine Studies, a co-editor of Jadaliyya, and a Contributing Editor to the Middle East Report.

== Background ==
Rabbani was born in Heerenveen, Netherlands. His parents were Palestinian refugees. He received his B.A. in history and international relations from Tufts University in 1986. Additionally, Mouin Rabbani received his M.A. in contemporary Arab studies from Georgetown University.

== Career ==
For a short period of time, Rabbani worked for the United Nations Office of the Special Envoy for Syria before resigning in 2014. He also worked as head of the Middle East unit at the Martti Ahtisaari Peace Foundation, and as a senior Middle East analyst and special advisor on Israel-Palestine at the International Crisis Group. He also served as a researcher with Al Haq, the West Bank affiliate of the International Commission of Jurists.

Rabbani serves as co-editor of Jadaliyya, where he hosts the Connections podcast and oversees the Quick Thoughts section. He is managing editor and associate editor of the Journal of Peacebuilding and Development, and a contributing editor of Middle East Report. He is also a nonresident fellow at the Center for Conflict and Humanitarian Studies and at Democracy for the Arab World Now.

== Writing ==
Rabbani has written for a variety of publications including Third World Quarterly, Journal of Palestine Studies, The Nation, Foreign Policy, London Review of Books, NRC and The Hill. His opinion and analysis has been cited by international news media such as The New York Times, The Guardian, Reuters, Haaretz, The Washington Post, and Al Jazeera. Unlike some of his contemporaries, he has been critical of the feasibility of a one-state solution to the Israel–Palestine conflict, at least in the short term.

=== Books ===
- Aborted State? The UN Initiative and New Palestinian Junctures. Co-edited with Noura Erakat, 2013.
- Gaza Apocalypse to be published in 2026

== Interviews ==
- "Israel-Palestine Debate: Finkelstein, Destiny, M. Rabbani & Benny Morris | Lex Fridman Podcast #418" (debate with Norman Finkelstein, Benny Morris, and Destiny), 15 March 2024.
- "Debate: Does U.N. Statehood Bid Advance or Undermine Palestinian Struggle?" (debate with Ali Abunimah), Democracy Now, 23 September 2011.
- "Noam Chomsky: U.S.-Backed Israeli Policies Pursuing "End of Palestine"; Hezbollah Capture of Israeli Soldiers "Very Irresponsible Act" That Could Lead To "Extreme Disaster", Democracy Now, 14 July 2006.
