= Lisa Hajjar =

American academic

Lisa Hajjar is an American sociologist. She is a professor and department chair at the University of California, Santa Barbara sociology department, and a co-editor and contributor at the online magazine Jadaliyya.

== Works ==
- Hajjar, Lisa (2005). Courting Conflict: The Israeli Military Court System in the West Bank and Gaza. University of California Press. ISBN 978-0-520-24194-7.
- Hajjar, Lisa (2013). Torture: A Sociology of Violence and Human Rights. Routledge. ISBN 978-0-415-51806-2.
- Hajjar, Lisa (2022). The War in Court: Inside the Long Fight Against Torture. University of California Press. ISBN 978-0-520-37893-3.
