= Sumaya Awad =

Palestinian American writer and activist

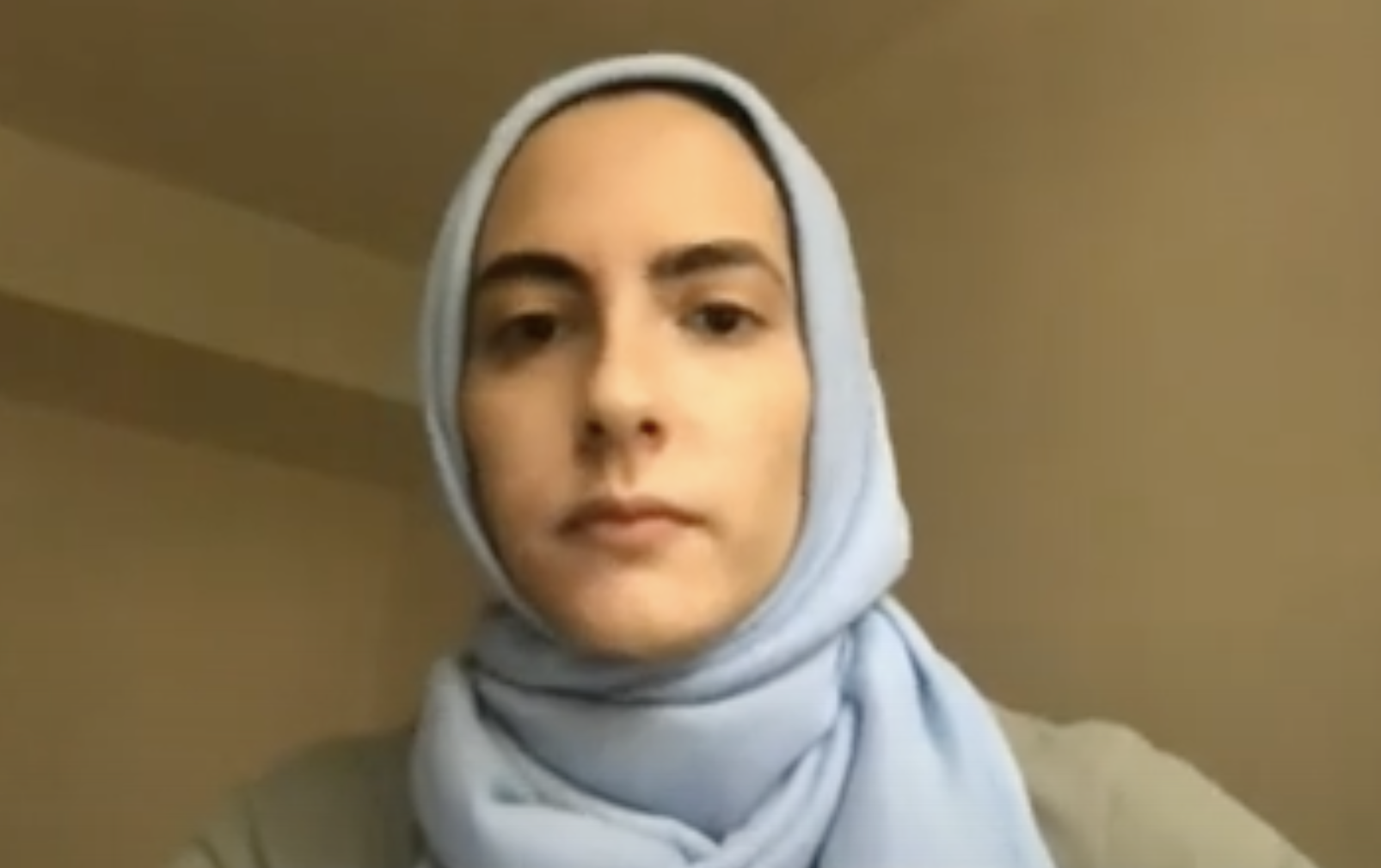
- Sumaya Awad in 2021
- Employer: Adalah Justice Project
- Organization: Democratic Socialists of America
- Children: 1

Sumaya Awad is a Palestinian American writer and activist based in New York City. She directs strategy and communications for the Adalah Justice Project, and co-edited the book Palestine: A Socialist Introduction, published in 2020.

== Career ==
Awad is Director of Strategy and Communications for the Adalah Justice Project, and a member of the Democratic Socialists of America.

With Bill V. Mullen, Awad created the website Against Canary Mission in 2018, intended to counter the Canary Mission blacklist of Palestine solidarity activists.

Awad co-edited the book Palestine: A Socialist Introduction with brian bean. The book was published by Haymarket Books in December 2020.

On October 13, 2023, Awad appeared on NY1 to discuss the Gaza war. She was present at Jewish Voice for Peace's October 27 protest at Grand Central Terminal, where she told The New York Times that she was calling on the United States government to "follow the guidance and the wants of the majority of Americans."

“It’s just so astonishing that we have to be out here starving in the cold to relay the message that Palestinians deserve to live. And that Palestinians deserve to be grieved, just like any other person.”

— Sumaya Awad, The Washington Post

On November 27, 2023, she joined more than 20 other Palestine solidarity activists and state legislators in a five-day-long hunger strike outside the White House to call for a ceasefire in Gaza. While most of the group joined for shorter periods of time, Awad was one of eight who did not eat for the entire five days. In a press conference announcing the hunger strike, she referenced the shooting of three Palestinian American students in Vermont, saying: "This is what happens when we don’t support a permanent ceasefire and our government continues to dehumanize Palestinians." She additionally emphasized the role of the United States government in supporting Israel, saying that "we are not just silent observers. We are complicit in what is happening in Palestine."

== Personal life ==
Awad lives in New York City. She has a young daughter, who spent time in a neonatal intensive care unit after birth; Awad has drawn parallels between her own daughter's experience and that of infants in the 2023 Gaza Strip preterm birth crisis.

Her grandfather's family lived in West Jerusalem before being expelled into Lebanon during the Nakba.
