= Jadaliyya =

Online magazine

- Co-editors: Ziad Abu-Rish; Anthony Alessandrini; Sinan Antoon; Ibtisam Azem; Rosie Bsheer; Elliott Colla; Noura Erakat; Bassam Haddad; Lisa Hajjar; Maya Mikdashi; Mouin Rabbani; Hesham Sallam; Nadya Sbaiti; Sherene Seikaly; Mohamed Waked
- Categories: Ezine (free); social networks; scholarship; news
- Circulation: 70,000 weekly
- Publisher: Arab Studies Institute (ASI)
- Founded: 2010
- First issue: September 21, 2010; 15 years ago
- Country: Global
- Language: English; Arabic; French; Spanish
- Website: www.jadaliyya.com

Jadaliyya (Arabic: جدلية, lit. 'Dialectic') is an independent ezine founded in 2010 by the Arab Studies Institute (ASI) to cover the Arab World and the broader Middle East. It publishes articles in Arabic, French, English and Turkish, and is run primarily on a volunteer basis by an editorial team, and an expanding pool of contributors that includes academics, journalists, activists and artists.

== Overview ==
Jadaliyya (جدلية) is derived from the Arabic: جدل, romanized: jadal, lit. 'controversy', meaning "dialectic."

Jadaliyya's co-editors are unpaid volunteers and the magazine does not accept advertising. While most of Jadaliyya is either self-funded or funded by barter for "big projects," it has received grants from the Open Society Institute. According to Portal 9: "The Arab uprisings, which gained momentum only a few months after Jadaliyya was established, firmly catapulted it to the forefront of critical debates and analysis of the Arab world."

George Mason University professor Bassam Haddad, its founding editor, said that Jadaliyya aspires to "offer a scholarly, left-of-center ‘counter discourse’ to the mainstream conversation about the Arab world." It is described both by its readers and its contributors as progressive, pro-Palestinian, and post-Orientialist. Articles are often skeptical of American foreign policy and focused on the impact of colonial and postcolonial power relations. Georgetown University professor and contributor Elliot Colla noted, "I couldn't say there's a dogma; in fact there's a lot of argument and debate [....] but there is a political project." Another editor described Jadaliyya as "friends publishing friends on issues they agree upon."

== History ==
Jadaliyya is one in a series of knowledge production projects under the rubric of ASI. These include an academic research journal (est. 1992), a documentary film collective (2003), and a publishing house (2012). According to Haddad (a founder of ASI) Jadaliyya originated in 2002 with the intent to create "a publication that would have a wider circulation" than the scholarly, peer-reviewed Arab Studies Journal. Haddad and his colleague Sinan Antoon stated that "good knowledge was being hoarded in journals that are largely inaccessible to the general public" and wanted "to reach beyond the academic community." The idea was shelved, however, after the Iraq War began in 2003 and their team focused instead on producing three documentary films in a period of six years (About Baghdad, What is Said About Arabs and Terrorism, and The Other Threat).

In 2009, influenced by new developments in social media, Haddad revisited the project with Antoon, Sherene Seikaly, Nadya Sbaiti, Noura Erakat, and Maya Mikdashi. They completed a private test launch of Jadaliyya during the summer of 2010 and officially launched the ezine on September 21, 2010. The editorial team expanded and to 15 co-editors.

Jadaliyya was founded on "an anti-corporate and solidarity-based model of work. Whenever possible, our mode of operation is largely non-hierarchical, though not without leadership." The goal of the co-editors was to make an interactive and "user-friendly" website with open language (English, Arabic, and French) and submission length. The editors utilized a number of social media formats including Facebook, Twitter, Tumblr, tablet and mobile phone apps, and Readspeaker. According to Haddad: "nearly every submission goes through a rigorous review process that includes at least two reviews before going to the copy editor."

== Response ==
Jadaliyya has been influential in both education and the media. Ursula Lindsey in The Chronicle of Higher Education noted that Jadaliyya has "become a reference for many professors in the field. It reaches beyond academia as well. Updated daily, the site boasts about half a million unique visitors a month, and its articles are widely shared on social media [....] Jadaliyya’s reception has been largely positive among scholars of the Middle East."

Jadaliyya has quickly become the go-to place for information and analysis of what is going on in Egypt and the region. Moreover, Jadaliyya is the place where writing of a kind that we associate with the best of anthropology--in the moment, grounded in theory, capturing historical transformation through engagement in events as they unfold--has been published. It seems to provide solutions to many problems we have been engaged with in anthropology -- the production of knowledge in and about the region, particularly in this time of the massive uprisings … Jadaliyya has been the place where some of the best "ethnographic" writing about the region in this time of incredible transformation and change is to be found.

— Assistant Professor of Anthropology Julia Elyachar

Media outlets such as The Atlantic, The Christian Science Monitor, The Chronicle of Higher Education, The Guardian,Inter Press Service,La Stampa, London Review of Books, The New York Times, NPR, and PBS referenced Jadaliyya when discussing events related to the Arab Uprisings, as well as the Middle East more generally. The Guardian stated that "the Arab [Studies] Institute’s Jadaliyya website is an invaluable resource", while Al-masry Al-youm (English Edition) suggested that it "quickly became a port of call for many wanting to understand the tumultuous events unfolding across the region" by offering "more nuanced, in-depth coverage than most, but without the delays and exclusivity of academic journals." In addition, Portal 9 referred to Jadaliyya as "an essential resource for many in and outside the Arab world" while Today's Zaman called it "one of the leading English language Arab websites."

Various international and regional media outlets including the Agence France-Presse (AFP), Al Jazeera English, BBC, China Central Television, China Radio International, CNN, Democracy Now, Deutsche Welle, El Mundo, The Guardian, Le Figaro, MSNBC, The PBS NewsHour, Russia Today, The Wall Street Journal, and The Washington Post have featured interviews with Jadaliyya co-editors. In addition, media outlets such as The Guardian and Courrier International have republished Jadaliyya articles

== Book ==
The Dawn of the Arab Uprisings: End of an Old Order?, was edited Haddad, Bsheer, and Abu-Rish. Composed of twenty essays originally published in Jadaliyya, the text (according to the editors) sheds "light on the historical background and initial impact of the mass uprisings which have shaken the Arab world since December 2010 [....] while the book focuses on those states that have been most affected by the uprisings it also covers the impact on Jordan, Saudi Arabia, Lebanon, Palestine, and Iraq."

Timothy Mitchell, professor of Middle Eastern Studies at Columbia University, observed that "as the work of scholars and activists with a rich knowledge of the region's histories and political aspirations, the essays offer lasting insights into the forces shaping a new moment in world history." Laleh Khalili, Senior Lecturer in Middle East Politics, SOAS, University of London suggested that The Dawn of the Arab Uprisings: End of an Old Order? is "a very rare combination - scholarly but also accessible for a broad public." She also argues that it will be "a much-treasured volume for undergraduate students, and its sophistication will also benefit postgraduates and academics."
