= List of Palestinian rocket attacks on Israel in 2020 =

This is a list of Palestinian rocket attacks on Israel in 2020. All of the attacks originated in the Gaza Strip, unless stated otherwise. This list does not include reports of deaths and injuries caused by Hamas rocket and mortar attacks that fell within Gaza.

== January ==
On 15 January, four rockets were launched at Israel. Two rockets were intercepted by the Iron Dome and two fell in open fields. Israeli air strikes targeted Hamas posts.

== February ==
After the near-daily rocket and mortar attacks over two weeks, also with the launch of dozens of balloon-borne explosive devices, Israeli politicians threatened a harsh military response if attacks continued. On February 5, the military reduced the permitted Gaza fishing zone to 10 nautical miles and canceled some 500 travel permits.

On 16 February, at least two rockets were fired at southern Israel, apparently hitting open fields and causing no injuries. In response, Israeli airstrikes in the Gaza Strip targeted Hamas installations.

On 23 February, in response to the killing of Muhammad al-Na'im and the subsequent desecration of his corpse by an Israeli army bulldozer Palestinian Islamic Jihad (PIJ) fired over 21 rockets from Gaza of which 13 were intercepted by the Iron Dome defense system. Israel retaliated by airstrikes on PIJ sites in Gaza. Israel also closed the fishing zone in the Gaza Strip. According to The Jerusalem Post, nearly 100 rockets were fired from 23 February until 11 pm on 24 February. In response, Israel attacked PIJ targets near Damascus, Syria, killing Ziad Ahmad Mansour, 23 and Salim Ahmad Salim, 24 of the Al-Quds Brigades, as well as in Gaza. On 26 February, the Erez and Kerem Shalom border crossings were reopened and the fishing zone reopened.

== May ==
On 5 May, one rocket was fired from Gaza at Israeli communities near the border for the first time in over 40 days.

== June ==
On 15 June, one rocket was fired into southern Israel, striking an empty field, causing no injuries or damage.

On 26 June, two rockets were fired from Gaza that caused no injuries or damage.

== July ==
On 5 July, two rockets hit open terrain in southern Israel, and no casualties or damage were reported. A third was intercepted by Israeli air defense.

== August ==
On 2 August, one rocket fired from Gaza was intercepted by Iron Dome.

On 16 August, two rockets were intercepted by air defense batteries. The municipality of Sderot said that one house had been hit by shrapnel. An Israeli man of 58 was lightly injured by broken glass and a house near Sderot had taken a direct hit from a rocket. Only property was damaged.

On 21 August, at least 12 rockets were fired from the Gaza Strip into Israel. One landed near a house in Sderot on Friday, causing extensive damage.

== September ==
On 15 September, the Iron Dome missile defense system intercepted eight of 13 rockets. At least two people were injured and several cars damaged by shrapnel near a mall in Ashdod. Six pedestrians also were injured as panicked shoppers ran for shelters.

== October ==
On 16 October, one rocket was fired from Gaza which apparently exploded in an open field.

On 22 October, two rockets were fired toward Ashkelon. One rocket fell in an open field, while the second was intercepted by the Iron Dome system.

== November ==
On 14 November, two rockets were fired toward Ashdod and Kibbutz Palmachim. There were no reports of damage or injuries.

On 21 November, one rocket was fired toward Ashkelon.

== December ==
On 26 December, two rockets were intercepted over Ashkelon.

== See also ==
- Timeline of the Israeli–Palestinian conflict, 2020
