= Justice for Some: Law and the Question of Palestine =

2019 book by Noura Erakat

- Author: Noura Erakat
- Language: English
- Subject: International law, Middle East politics, Israeli–Palestinian conflict
- Genre: Non-fiction
- Publisher: Stanford University Press
- Publication date: 2019
- Publication place: United States
- Pages: 352
- ISBN: 9781503608832
- Website: https://www.sup.org/books/title/?id=26507

Justice for Some: Law and the Question of Palestine is a 2019 book by Noura Erakat which explores the relationship between international law and the politics of the Israeli-Palestinian conflict. The work gives special attention to international law as a political tool, which by itself, Erakat argues, is not sufficient to guarantee justice.

== Major themes ==
Justice for Some offers a critical examination of the ways in which international law has been applied and interpreted in the context of the Israeli-Palestinian conflict. Erakat argues that international law is not an objective arbiter but rather a tool that can be used strategically to advance the interests of various actors. Erakat describes this as "legal work", a term used by Duncan Kennedy to describe efforts to leverage law to achieve a desired outcome. Further, Erakat shows how interpretations of the law depend on the historical context, the balance of power, and the strategy of the jurist. She goes on to discuss how legal rights specified by the law are dependent on the ability to enforce the law, or as described in the introduction, "law is politics".

Throughout the text, Erakat highlights the use of a sui generis legal framework to establish new law that excludes Palestinians from otherwise applicable legal protections. Specifically, Erakat argues that the sui generis framework adopted through Israeli legal work has placed Palestinians outside the normal state of law, permitting settler-colonial elimination of the Palestinians through their removal and dispossession.

Justice for Some examines what Erakat describes as five important junctures in the history of Palestine and Israel which demonstrate how "legal work" can shape the meaning of law. The five junctures described are:

1. The decades between the Balfour Declaration and the end of the first period of Martial law in Israel (1917-1966).
2. The occupation of the West Bank and the Gaza Strip in 1967.
3. The passage of General Assembly Resolution 3210.
4. The First Intifada and the Oslo peace process.
5. The Second Intifada and Operation Cast Lead.

== Criticisms of "Justice for Some: Law and the Question of Palestine" ==
Some reviews of "Justice for Some: Law and the Question of Palestine" by Noura Erakat point out that the book lacks a clear political vision and practical solutions for the future. Critics feel that while Erakat provides a thorough analysis of the limitations and failures of international law, she does not offer concrete steps towards achieving Palestinian justice and self-determination.

Additionally, some reviewers suggest that Erakat's arguments can be overly academic and dense, making the book less accessible to a broader audience. The heavy reliance on legal and historical analysis, though comprehensive, can be challenging for readers who are not familiar with these fields.
