= FouseyTube =

Palestinian–American YouTuber (born 1990)

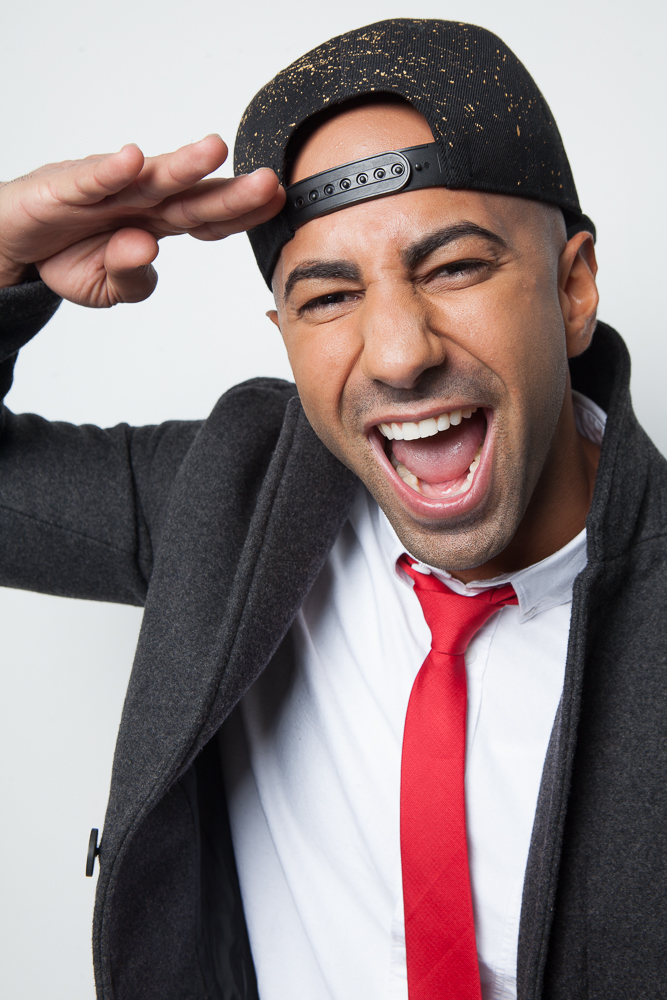
- Erakat in 2016
- Born: Yousef Saleh Erakat; January 22, 1990 (age 36); Fremont, California, U.S.
- Other name: Fousey
- Education: San Jose State University (BA)
- Occupations: YouTuber; online streamer; actor; musician; bodybuilder
- Height: 5 ft 10 in (178 cm)
- Relatives: Noura Erakat (sister); Ahmad Erekat (cousin); Saeb Erakat (uncle)

YouTube information
- Channel: FOUSEY
- Years active: 2011–present
- Genres: Interviews; comedy; vlogging
- Subscribers: 10.3 million
- Views: 1.91 billion
- Last updated: June 21, 2026

Yousef Saleh Erakat (/ˈjuːsəf ˈsælə ˈɛrəkæt/ YOO-səf SAL-ə ERR-ə-kat; Arabic: يوسف صالح عريقات, romanized: Yūsuf Ṣāliḥ ʿUrayqāt, Palestinian Arabic: Yūsif Ṣāliḥ ʿRēqāt; born January 22, 1990), also known as FouseyTube or Fousey (/ˈfuːsi/ FOO-see), is an American YouTuber. His YouTube channels include FouseyTUBE (later renamed Crashout YSE), and the reality vlog-channel DOSEofFOUSEY. He is the recipient of two Streamy Awards, which he won in 2015 and 2016.

Outside his YouTube career, Erakat has expanded into acting, online streaming, boxing, music, and bodybuilding. As an actor, he starred in Tyler Perry's comedy horror film Boo! A Madea Halloween (2016) and its 2017 sequel. In January 2025, he released his debut album, G7: The Death of Fousey, which earned negative reviews. In October 2025, he won his first bodybuilding title in Sacramento.

== Personal life ==
Yousef Saleh Erakat was born in Fremont, California, to Palestinian parents originally from Abu Dis. He has three older siblings, including Noura Erakat, who is a legal scholar and professor at Rutgers University. Erakat attended San Jose State University and majored in theatre arts. He moved to Los Angeles after graduating in 2013 to pursue his acting career.

Erakat was brought up in a religious Muslim family, and has on several occasions criticized negative stereotyping of Muslims.

Erakat has spoken on his ongoing struggles with depression, porn addiction, anxiety and bipolar disorder, mentioning them frequently in his daily vlogs and once on VH1.

== YouTube career ==
=== 2011–2014: Beginnings, fitness and controversy ===
Erakat has had multiple YouTube channels in the past, namely ones relating to fitness. His past channels included him following a workout routine, P90X, and giving a review and before and after of his journey. In 2012, Erakat was listed 3rd on the list of "40 Inspiring Muslims Under 40" by MBMuslima Magazine. It was not until he began making comedic skits about his Middle Eastern upbringing that his popularity grew.

He later began creating prank videos and further grew his audience. These videos have been criticized both for being dangerous and others staged. Nonetheless, he is often considered one of the original YouTube pranksters.

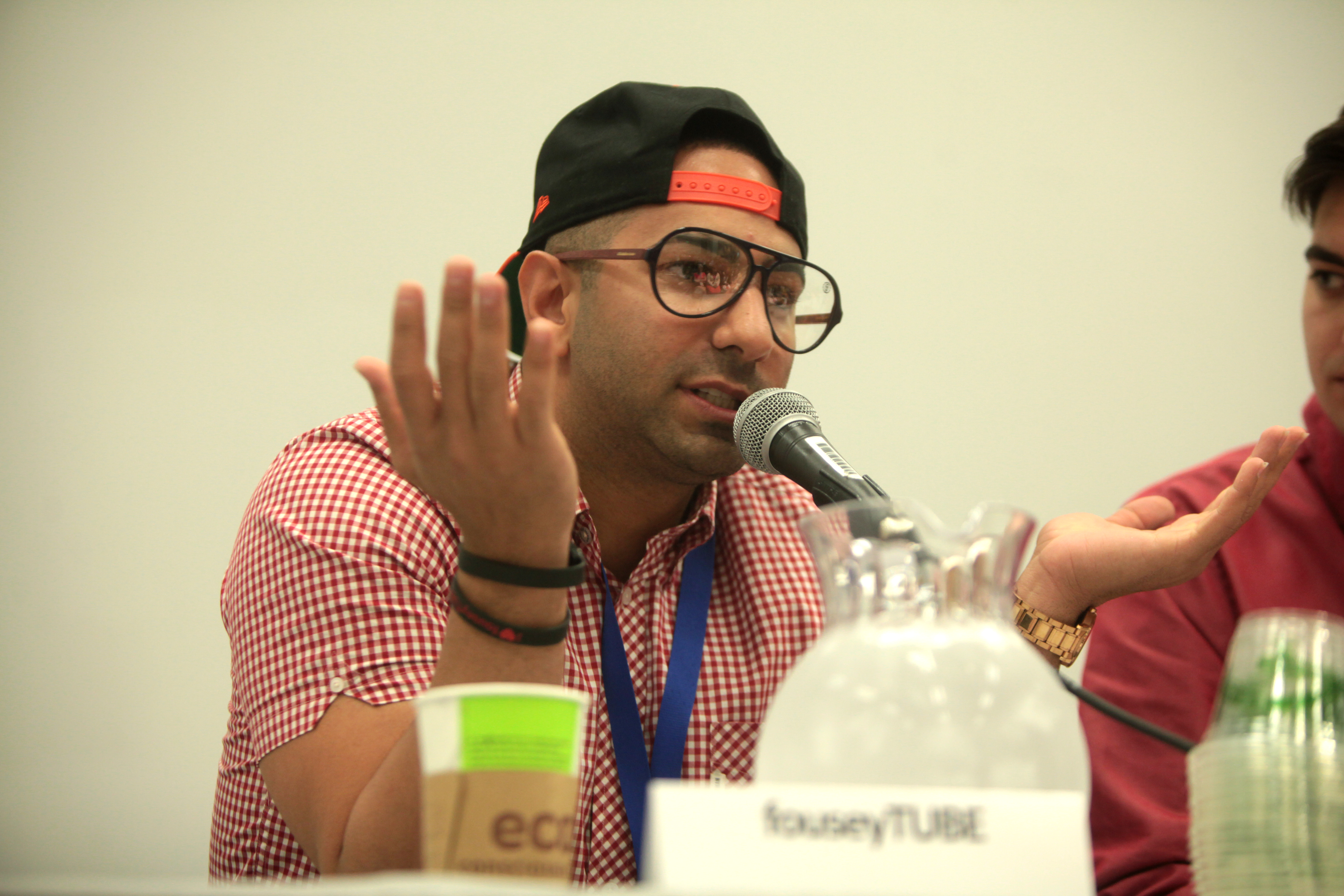
Erakat at an event in 2014

=== 2021–present: Return to YouTube and new book ===
In 2021, Erakat returned to YouTube with a new YouTube Boxing related channel named "fousey". On this channel he has uploaded boxing related videos with Slim Albaher, AnEsonGib and other YouTubers. He started to call himself DanaTube. In the same year, he also returned to his DOSEofFousey channel. He told that he will use his DOSEofFousey channel for clips.

In January 2021, it was announced that he was going to release a book titled Warning: This Is Not a Motivational Story.

== Streaming career ==
On August 6, 2023, while Twitch streaming at an airport, he encountered an intoxicated woman who had been a victim of sex trafficking. After flirting and kissing, he and the woman disappeared for around 20 minutes. After bragging that they had sex, however, Erakat received criticism. He then claimed the event was a prank, before starting to cry because he felt "guilty". He abruptly terminated the stream soon after. After a wave of backlash, he proceeded to take a hiatus from Twitch, citing mental health issues. The day after the incident he was banned for hateful conduct towards the LGBT community. Shortly after his Twitch ban, Erakat announced that he would be streaming on Kick.

On August 23, 2023, Erakat was arrested on livestream by police in Miami, Florida after calling 911 on himself following a dispute with another streamer.

== Boxing career ==
Erakat made his boxing debut against Slim Albaher on September 29, 2019, losing by a technical knockout. Erakat suffered a broken nose and needed two surgeries to fix it. Following that experience, he vowed never to fight again. On August 27, 2022, he faced Deji Olatunji and lost via TKO, vowing to never fight again for the second time.

== Music career ==
In January 2025, Erakat released his debut album, G7: The Death of Fousey, which earned negative reviews.

== Boxing record ==
=== Semi Professional ===
1 fight	0 wins	1 loss
By knockout	0	1

No.	Result	Record	Opponent	Type	Round, time	Date	Location	Notes
1	Loss	0–1	Deji Olatunji	TKO	3 (4) 1:28	27 Aug 2022	The O2 Arena, London, England	MF–Professional bout

=== Amateur ===
1 fight	0 wins	1 loss
By knockout	0	1

No.	Result	Record	Opponent	Type	Round, time	Date	Location	Notes
1	Loss	0–1	Slim Albaher	TKO	4 (6), 1:30	Sep 29, 2019	York Hall, London, England	

== Filmography ==
=== Film ===
Year	Film	Role	Notes	Ref.
2014	Twin Blocke	Trevor	Short film	
2016	We Love You	Ford		
2016	Boo! A Madea Halloween	Jonathan		
2017	Boo 2! A Madea Halloween	Jonathan		
2017	#Reality High	Himself		

=== Web ===
Year	Series	Role	Notes	Ref.
2016	Fight of the Living Dead: Experiment 88	Himself	Episode: "HELP ME!! FIGHT OF THE LIVING DEAD"	
2020–2021	Reality House	Himself	Seasons 2–3	

== Awards and nominations ==
Year	Work	Category	Award	Result	Ref.
2014	fouseyTUBE	Pranks	4th Streamy Awards	Nominated	
2015	fouseyTUBE	YouTube Comedian	Shorty Awards	Nominated	
2015	fouseyTUBE	YouTube Star of the Year presented by A&E	Shorty Awards	Nominated	
2015	fouseyTUBE	Snapchatter	Shorty Awards	Nominated	
2015	fouseyTUBE	Pranks	5th Streamy Awards	Nominated	
2015	fouseyTUBE	Show of the Year	5th Streamy Awards	Won	
2016	DOSEofFOUSEY	First Person	6th Streamy Awards	Nominated	
2016	Yousef Erakat	Entertainer of the Year	6th Streamy Awards	Won	
