= Killing of Ahmad Erekat =

2020 killing in the Israeli–Palestinian conflict

- Part of the Israeli–Palestinian conflict
- The victim in an undated personal photograph
- Location: Abu Dis, Israeli-occupied West Bank, Palestine
- Date: 23 June 2020
- Attack type: Shooting after vehicular collision
- Deaths: 1 (Erekat)
- Injuries: 1 (Israeli officer)
- Accused: Israel Police

Ahmad Mustafa Musa Erekat (Arabic: أحمد مصطفى موسى عريقات, romanized: Aḥmad Muṣṭafā Mūsā ʿUrayqāt, Palestinian Arabic: ʿRēqāt; 13 October 1993 – 23 June 2020) was a 26-year-old Palestinian man who was shot and killed by Israeli police after his vehicle rammed into one of the barriers at a military checkpoint near Abu Dis, a village in the West Bank, on 23 June 2020. Erekat was a nephew of Palestinian politician Saeb Erekat and a cousin of Palestinian-American attorney Noura Erakat and Palestinian-American YouTuber FouseyTube.

== Background ==
In the years leading up to the incident, the region had seen a series of shootings, stabbings, and car-ramming attacks against Israeli soldiers and civilians, while human rights groups had accused Israeli forces of repeatedly utilizing excessive force and opening fire on motorists who had simply lost control of their vehicles.

Prior to his death, Erekat had released a video denying rumors that he collaborated with Israeli security forces. While some Hebrew media outlets reported the video was recorded shortly before the incident to imply it was a pre-attack testimonial, Erekat's family stated the clip was months old and refuted that characterization.

== Incident ==
On the evening of 23 June 2020, Ahmad Erekat's family was scheduled to hold a wedding party for his sister. While running errands, Erekat last left his house at around 3:30 p.m. At around 4 p.m., Erekat's father Mustafa learned from his niece that his son had been involved in a car accident at an Israeli checkpoint, and headed to the location. He was denied a request to approach his son, was interrogated as to why Ahmad was going to Bethlehem, and was reportedly threatened with the demolition of his house had his son harmed an Israeli military officer.

CCTV footage released after the incident shows Erekat slowly driving up to the checkpoint and then turning his vehicle and crashing it into a group of officers standing near the kiosk; a female police officer is struck head-on and falls against an adjacent van. He then exits the car and walks backwards with his arms raised as he is shot several times.

The police officers justified their actions as constituting self-defense, saying that Erekat deliberately rammed his car into them. A later statement from Israeli sources said that evidence "provided a foundation for the [conclusion] that a deliberate car attack was carried out. In addition, findings in Erekat's mobile phone reinforced the conclusion that a deliberate attack took place" and that "Erekat emerged [from the vehicle], [moving] quickly toward Border Police fighters while waving his hands in a manner taken as threatening"; however, footage shows him walking backwards with his hands up.

== Investigation ==
British research group Forensic Architecture and Palestinian human rights organization Al-Haq launched an investigation into the killing using 3D modeling and cross-checking CCTV footage with witness videos alongside a forensic collision expert, concluding that the car's collision with the checkpoint was an accident and that the Israeli officers' actions therefore constituted an extrajudicial killing. The investigation also charged the officers with excessive use of lethal force, saying that Erekat "did not pose any immediate threat" and had been shot at six times, and was later denied urgent medical care following the incident.

In response, a joint statement from the Foreign Ministry, the Shin Bet, the Israel Defense Forces, and the Defense Ministry denied the assertions of the investigation and stated that Erekat had been examined by medical personnel shortly after being shot, but was pronounced dead on the scene as he had no pulse and was not breathing.

== Withholding of remains ==
The day following the killing, Mustafa Erekat headed to Qalandia checkpoint, where he was denied any meetings, and received a call from his lawyer him that he would be returned Ahmad's remains on that day. This decision was, however, reversed by Israeli Defense Minister Benny Gantz, who decided that Erekat's body was to be seized. In June 2020, human rights organization Adalah filed a petition to the Israeli Supreme Court on the family's behalf seeking the release of his remains for burial. In August 2021, the court rejected the petition in a 2–1 majority decision, ruling that security regulations authorized the military to temporarily withhold the bodies of Palestinians to serve as "bargaining chips" for future negotiations regarding Israeli soldiers and missing civilians held in Gaza. A subsequent request by Adalah for an additional hearing was rejected in 2022.

On 23 April 2026, Adalah filed a new petition to the Supreme Court on behalf of Erekat's father, demanding the immediate release of the remains. The petition argued that the legal basis for the court's 2021 ruling had collapsed following the October 2025 Gaza peace plan, under which all living and deceased Israeli captives were returned by January 2026. Because the underlying government cabinet decisions were explicitly tied to the holding of Israeli hostages in Gaza, Adalah argued that the continued retention of Erekat's body after nearly six years was unlawful, lacked authority, and constituted a severe violation of constitutional human dignity and international covenants.

== See also ==
- Timeline of the Israeli–Palestinian conflict in 2020
