= Maen Rashid Areikat =

Palestinian diplomat

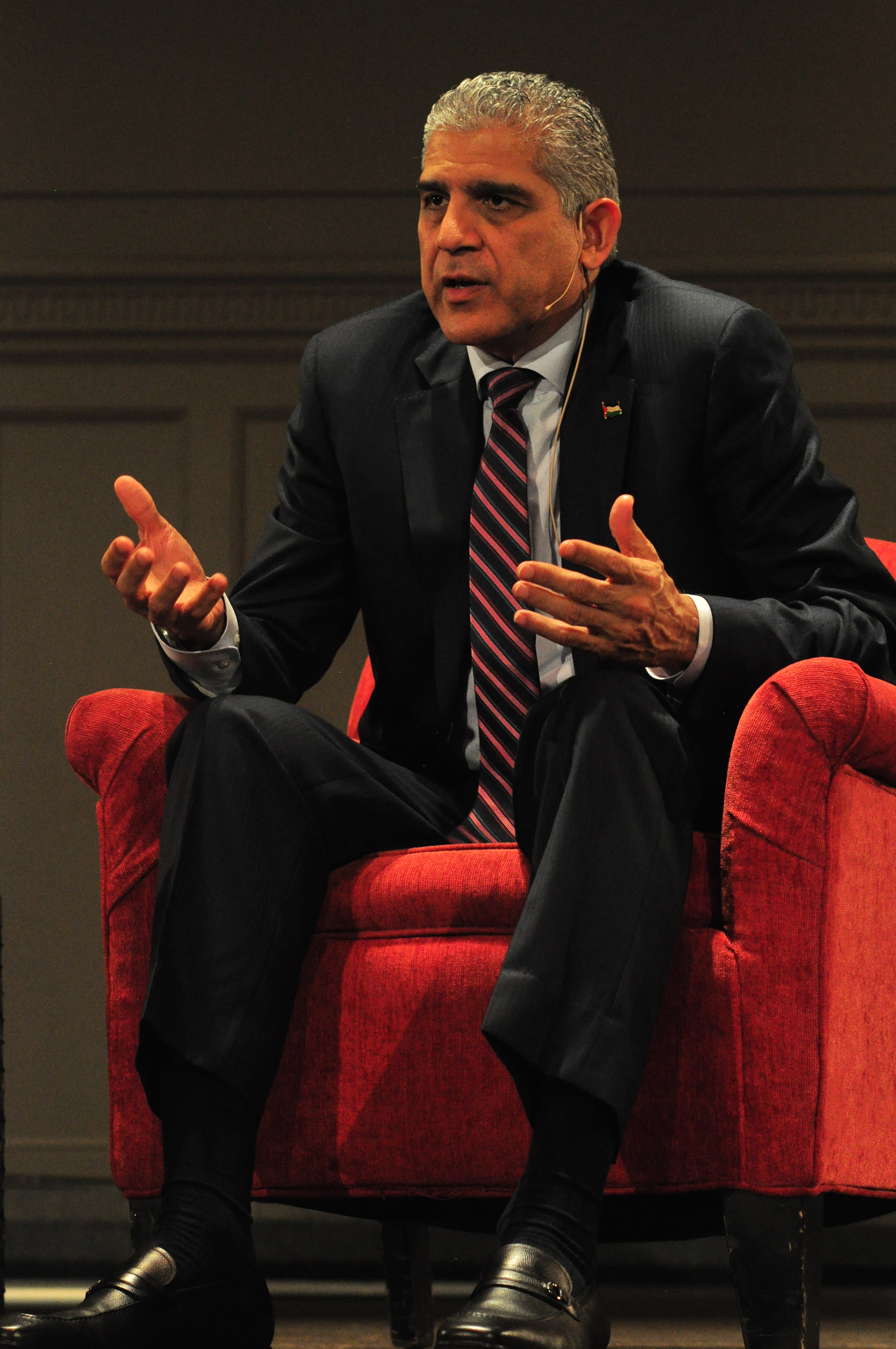
Maen Rashid Areikat, 2016

Maen Rashid Khalil Areikat (also Erikat or Erekat; Arabic: معن رشيد خليل عريقات, romanized: Maʿin Rashīd Khalīl ʿUrayqāt, Palestinian Arabic: ʿRēqāt; born October 12, 1960) is a Palestinian diplomat and former chief of the PLO delegation in Washington.

He was born in Jericho and obtained a B.Sc. in finance from Arizona State University in 1983 and MBA from Western International University in 1987.

In 1993–1998 he worked as spokesman of the Orient House, then unofficial PLO headquarters in East Jerusalem. He started working for the Palestinian National Authority in 1998, first at the Negotiations Affairs Department (NAD) while serving as its Director-General until March 2008. In 2008–2009 he served as Coordinator-General of NAD. In May 2009 he was appointed chief of the PLO Delegation to the United States.

On January 18, 2011, the Palestinian flag was flown for the first time in front of the diplomatic headquarters in Washington, D.C..

In 2011, USA Today published remarks by Areikat made during a meeting with reporters sponsored by the Christian Science Monitor, in which he stated that "After the experience of the last 44 years of military occupation and all the conflict and friction, I think it would be in the best interest of the two people to be separated," a statement which was taken by Elliott Abrams to mean the removal of Jews from an independent State of Palestine. The Center for American Progress found Areikat's previous comments to Tablet Magazine also endorsing population transfer to be "troubling" and similar to the views of then-Israeli foreign minister Avigdor Lieberman. USA Today noted that Areikat said that "he was referring to Israelis, not Jews." Areikat also subsequently clarified his remarks in a commentary to The Huffington Post, maintaining his support for a secular government but rejecting "persons who are amid an occupation, who are in my land illegally".

As for his personal life, he is married and has three children.
