= Noura Erakat =

Palestinian-American academic (born 1980)

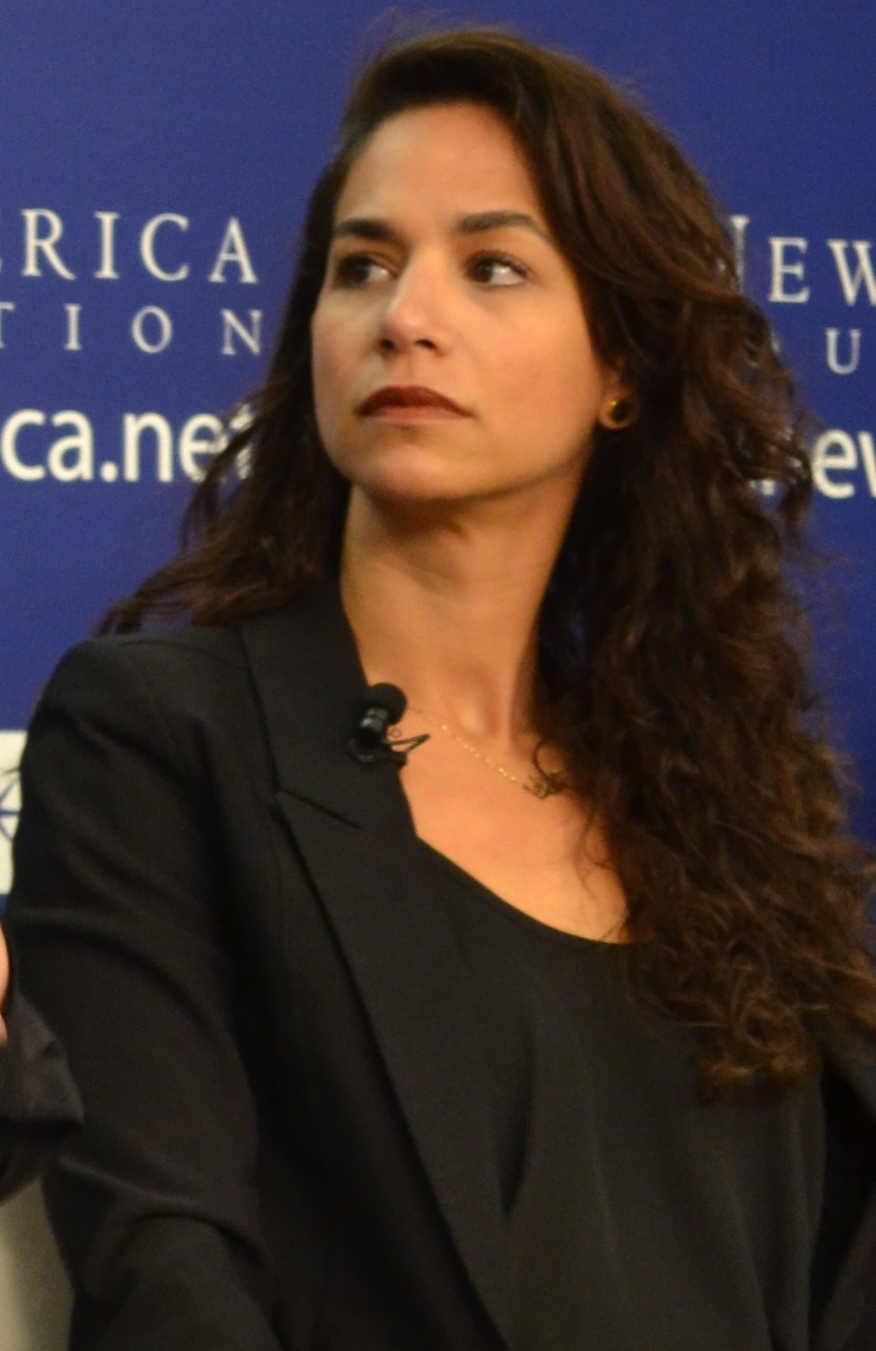
- Erakat in 2014
- Born: Noura Saleh Erakat; January 16, 1980 (age 46); Alameda County, California, U.S.
- Education: University of California, Berkeley (BA, JD); Georgetown University (LLM)
- Occupations: Activist, attorney
- Relatives: Yousef Erakat (brother); Saeb Erakat (uncle); Ahmad Erekat (cousin)

Noura Saleh Erakat (/ˈnʊərə ˈsælə ˈɛrəkæt/ NOOR-ə SAL-ə ERR-ə-kat; Arabic: نورة صالح عريقات, romanized: Nūra Ṣāliḥ ʿUrayqāt, Palestinian Arabic: ʿRēqāt; born January 16, 1980) is a Palestinian-American activist, university professor, legal scholar, and human rights attorney. She is currently a professor at Rutgers University, specializing in international studies. She is the co-founder of the online publication Jadaliyya. Her primary focus is on international law, human rights, and the Israeli–Palestinian conflict. She is a vocal critic of Israel and a prominent public commentator on Palestinian legal and political issues. Erakat has authored academic articles and the book, Justice for Some: Law and the Question of Palestine.

== Education and career ==
=== Education ===
Noura Saleh Erakat was born on January 16, 1980, in Alameda County, California. She attended the University of California, Berkeley and graduated with a Bachelor of Arts degree in 2002. She was a member of Phi Beta Kappa, and was named a UC-Berkeley Human Rights Center Summer Fellow in 2003. In 2005, she received her Juris Doctor from the UC Berkeley School of Law and was awarded the Francine Diaz Memorial Scholarship Award. She earned her LL.M. in National Security at Georgetown University Law Center in 2012, and her LL.M. in Legal Education upon completing the Abraham L. Freedman Teaching Fellowship at Temple University, Beasley School of Law.

=== Early legal and policy work ===
After law school, Erakat received a New Voices Fellowship to serve as the national grassroots organizer and legal advocate with the U.S. Campaign to End the Israeli Occupation (now the U.S. Campaign for Palestinian Rights). From 2007 to 2009, she was Legal Counsel for the Domestic Policy Subcommittee of the U.S. House Committee on Oversight and Government Reform. She later worked as Legal Advocacy Coordinator for the Badil Resource Center for Palestinian Refugee and Residency Rights between 2010-2013, drafting submissions to United Nations human rights treaty bodies and lobbying U.S. and UN officials on refugee and residency issues.

=== Academic positions and career ===
Erakat has held teaching positions at several U.S. universities, including International Studies at George Mason University’s New Century College (at present the School of Integrative Studies) and International Human Rights Law and the Middle East at Georgetown University. She is Professor of Africana Studies and the Program in Criminal Justice at Rutgers University–New Brunswick, where her teaching and research span humanitarian law, human rights law, national security law, and Palestinian Studies. She has also held visiting and fellowship roles, including a non‑resident fellowship with the Religious Literacy Project at Harvard Divinity School and the Mahmoud Darwish Visiting Professorship in Palestinian Studies at Brown University.

In 2010, she co-founded Jadaliyya, an online magazine published in English, Arabic, and French, which is affiliated with the non-profit Arab Studies Institute, operating in Washington, D.C. and Beirut. She currently serves on the board of the Institute for Policy Studies and serves as an associate professor at Rutgers University, is a member of the Board of Directors for the Trans-Arab Research Institute, and is a policy advisor with Al-Shabaka: The Palestinian Policy Network.

Erakat was said to be among three potential Palestinian American running mates for Dr Jill Stein, the left-wing Green Party's nominee for president of the United States in the 2024 election.

Erakat is a frequent media commentator; institutional biographies note appearances on CBS News, CNN, MSNBC, Fox News, BBC, NPR, and other outlets. She has written opinion pieces for major publications including The Washington Post, The New York Times, The Nation and others. She has provided legal and political commentary during major developments in the Israeli–Palestinian conflict, including Israeli annexation proposals, changes in Israeli leadership, and proceedings before the International Criminal Court. She addressed the United Nations at the 77th Commemoration of the Nakba at the United Nations Headquarters on 15 May 2025.

== Activism and advocacy ==
In May 2023, the Canadian MPP Sarah Jama, a 28-year old, black disability rights activist, was criticised by Zionist organisations for retweeting a tweet that Noura Erakat wrote. The tweet praised Khader Adnan, a Palestinian activist and prisoner in the West Bank who died after an 87-day hunger strike in protest against Israel's use of administrative detention to imprison Palestinians without charge or trial and "to expose the basic injustice in Israel's military justice system and its casual denial of basic freedoms."

In an October 13, 2023, interview on Democracy Now!, Erakat described Israel's military response in Gaza as a "genocidal campaign" and accused Western leaders of employing Islamophobic and racist tropes in their framing of the conflict. Writing for the Boston Review on the same day, she said that Western demands for Palestinian condemnation of Hamas were being used to silence criticism of Israel's conduct, and said the war was a product of apartheid and settler colonialism.

Erakat was also interviewed and featured in the film Seeds for Liberation by award-winning director Matthew Solomon. The film discusses the Free Palestine movement.

On September 16, 2026, Erakat and several other people attended a public commission hearing in Palm Beach County, Florida in order to protest the county's over $1 billion investments in Israel Bonds; after being reportedly denied the full time they had been allotted to speak, they were taken away by local law enforcement. She was briefly arrested on charges of trespassing before being released on bail later that day. “I wanted the comment on the budget. It was my constitutional right... I was told I need to leave the room. I was never told I was arrested before I was rough-handled by two officers who placed handcuffs on me, on purpose, very tight, who began to rough-handle me, to spread my legs to search me, and to explain that this is what happens when you don’t listen.”

== Awards and recognition ==
Erakat has been recognized with numerous awards for her activity and her writing.

Her book Justice for Some received widespread critical acclaim and was a finalist for the Palestine Book Awards in 2019.

In 2021, she received the Law for the People Award from the National Lawyers Guild for her work in advancing international human rights and justice in the Palestinian context.

In 2022, Erakat was named a Freedom Scholar by the Marguerite Casey Foundation and the Group Health Foundation, an honor recognizing scholars who advance social, economic, and educational justice.

In March 2025 Erakat received the Amnesty International Chair Award from the University of Ghent, Belgium.

== Personal life ==
She is the sister of Yousef Erakat, better known by his YouTube moniker, FouseyTube. She is the cousin of Ahmed Erakat, a Palestinian man who was shot and killed by Israeli police after his vehicle rammed into one of the barriers at a military checkpoint near Abu Dis, a village in the West Bank, on 23 June 2020.

== Publications and selected works ==
Erakat has published two books (one as an author and the other as a co-editor), and has appeared in publications such as the Columbia Human Rights Review, the UCLA Law Review, and the Journal of Palestine Studies, as well is in numerous media publications.

=== Academic books ===
- Aborted State? The UN Initiative and New Palestinian Junctures. Co-edited with Mouin Rabbani, 2013.
- Justice for Some: Law and the Question of Palestine. Stanford: Stanford University Press, 2019.

=== Academic papers ===
- "Palestinian Refugees and the Syrian Uprising: Filling the Protection Gap During Secondary Forced Displacement." Oxford Journal of International Refugee Law, Forthcoming.
- "New Imminence in the Time of Obama: The Impact of Targeted Killings on the Law of Self Defense." Arizona Law Review, Forthcoming.
- "The US v. The Red Cross: Customary International Humanitarian Law & Universal Jurisdiction." Denver Journal of International Law and Policy 41 Denv. J. Int'l L. & Pol'y 225 (Winter 2013).
- "It's Not Wrong, It's Illegal: Situating the Gaza Blockade Between International Law and the UN Response." UCLA Journal of Islamic and Near Eastern Law, Vol. 11, No. 37, 2011–2012.
- "Operation Cast Lead: The Elusive Quest for Self-Defense in International Law." 36 Rutgers L. Rec. 164 (2009).
- "Litigating the Arab-Israeli Conflict: The Politicization of U.S. Federal Courtrooms." 2 Berkeley Journal of Middle Eastern & Islamic Law 27 (2009).

=== Print media ===
- "U.S. Should Stop Funding Israel, or Let Others Broker Peace." New York Times, August 5, 2014.
- "Israeli operation not about security: Opposing view." USA Today, July 31, 2014.
- "Five Israeli Talking Points on Gaza—Debunked." The Nation, July 25, 2014.
- "Structural Violence on Trial: BDS and the Movement to Resist Erasure." Los Angeles Review of Books, March 16, 2014.

== Interviews ==
=== Radio ===
- Israel's greatest threats are internal, not Hamas or Iran, says former prime minister Ehud Barak CBC, June 5, 2018
- To The Point: "A New Shot at Peace Talks: Will it be Different this Time?" KCRW, July 31, 2013.
- Beyond Beijing: "Palestine seeking statehood bid in UN." China Radio International, November 21, 2012.

=== Video ===
- "Gaza in context.", gazaincontext.com, July 2016.
- "Debating the tactics and ethics of warfare on both sides of Mideast conflict." PBS NewsHour, July 24, 2014.
- "Gaza Debate: As Palestinian Deaths Top 100, Who's to Blame for Escalating Violence? What Can Be Done?." Democracy Now!, July 11, 2014.
- Up With Chris Hayes: "Obama wraps up first trip to Israel as president." MSNBC, March 22, 2013.
- Up With Chris Hayes: "What sparked escalation of violence in Israel and Gaza." MSNBC, November 17, 2012.
- "The Law in These Parts: A Discussion." WNET (PBS Thirteen)

== See also ==
- Rula Hassanein
