= Saeb Erekat =

Palestinian politician and diplomat (1955–2020)

- صائب محمد صالح عريقات
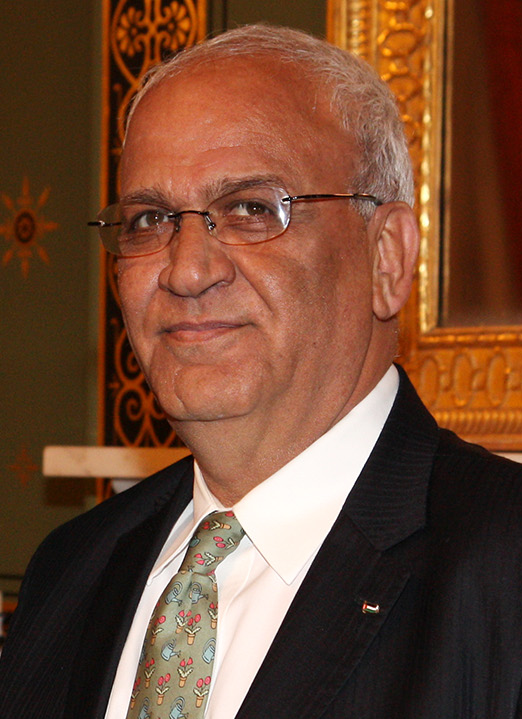
- Erekat in 2014

Secretary General of the Executive Committee of the Palestine Liberation Organization
- In office 5 July 2015 – 10 November 2020
- Preceded by: Yasser Abed Rabbo
- Succeeded by: Hussein al-Sheikh

Member of the Palestinian Parliament for Jericho Governorate
- In office 7 March 1996 – 10 November 2020
- Majority: 31,501

Minister of Information
- In office 27 September 2004 – 24 February 2005
- Prime Minister: Ahmed Qurei
- Preceded by: Ahmed Qurei
- Succeeded by: Nabil Shaath

Minister of Negotiations Affairs
- In office 30 April 2003 – 24 February 2005
- Prime Minister: Mahmoud Abbas; Ahmed Qurei
- Preceded by: Office established
- Succeeded by: Office disestablished

Minister of Local Government
- In office 5 July 1994 – 30 April 2003
- President: Yasser Arafat
- Preceded by: Office established
- Succeeded by: Jamal Al Shobaki

Personal details
- Born: Saeb Muhammad Salih Erekat; 28 April 1955 Abu Dis, Jordanian-administered West Bank, Palestine
- Died: 10 November 2020 (aged 65) Jerusalem
- Party: Fatah
- Spouse: Neameh Erekat (m. 1981; died 2020)
- Children: 4
- Relatives: Noura Erakat (niece); Yousef Erakat (nephew); Ahmad Erekat (nephew)
- Education: City College of San Francisco; San Francisco State University; University of Bradford

Saeb Muhammad Salih Erekat (also Erikat, Erakat or Arekat; Arabic: صائب محمد صالح عريقات, romanized: Ṣāʾib ʿUrayqāt, Palestinian Arabic: ʿRēqāt; 28 April 1955 – 10 November 2020) was a Palestinian politician and diplomat who was the secretary general of the executive committee of the PLO from 2015 until his death in 2020. He served as chief of the PLO Steering and Monitoring Committee until 12 February 2011. He participated in early negotiations with Israel and remained chief negotiator from 1995 until May 2003, when he resigned in protest from the Palestinian government. He reconciled with the party and was reappointed to the post in September 2003. Erekat died in the Hadassah Ein Karem Hospital in Jerusalem of complications from COVID-19 on 10 November 2020, at the age of 65.

== Personal life and education ==
Erekat was born in Abu Dis. He was a member of the Palestinian branch of the Erekat family, itself a branch of the Howeitat tribal confederation. Erekat was one of seven children, with his brothers and sisters living outside of Israel or Palestine. He was 12 years old when the Israelis occupied the West Bank, and was detained by them a year later for writing anti-occupation graffiti, posting fliers and throwing stones.

In 1972, Erekat moved to San Francisco, California, to attend college. He spent two years at City College of San Francisco, a two-year community college. He then transferred to San Francisco State University. There, Erekat received a BA in international relations (in 1977) and an MA in political science (in 1979). He completed his PhD in peace and conflict studies at the University of Bradford in England (in 1983).

Erekat was married to Neameh, and was the father of twin daughters Dalal and Salam; and two sons, Ali and Muhammad.

== Career ==
=== Academia ===
After gaining his doctorate in England, Erekat moved to the West Bank town of Nablus to lecture in political science at An-Najah National University.

=== Al-Quds editor ===
He served for 12 years on the editorial board of the locally widely circulated Palestinian newspaper, Al-Quds.

=== Politics ===
In 1991, Erekat was deputy head of the Palestinian delegation to the Madrid Conference and the subsequent follow-up talks in Washington D.C. between 1992 and 1993. In 1994, he was appointed the Minister for Local Government for the Palestinian National Authority and also the Chairman of the Palestinian negotiation delegation. In 1995, Erekat served as Chief Negotiator for the Palestinians during the Oslo period. He was then elected to the Palestinian Legislative Council in 1996, representing Jericho. As a politician, Erekat was considered to be a Yasser Arafat loyalist, including the Camp David meetings in 2000 and the negotiations at Taba in 2001. Erekat was also, along with Arafat and Faisal Husseini, one of the three high-ranking Palestinians who asked Ariel Sharon not to visit Al-Aqsa in September 2000, an event which was followed by the Second Intifada. He also acted as Arafat's English interpreter. When Mahmoud Abbas was nominated to serve as Prime Minister of the Palestinian Legislative Council in early 2003, Erekat was slated to be Minister of Negotiations in the new cabinet, but he soon resigned after he was excluded from a delegation to meet Israeli Prime Minister Ariel Sharon. This was interpreted as part of an internal Palestinian power struggle between Abbas and Arafat. Erekat was later reappointed to his post and participated in the 2007 Annapolis Conference, where he took over from Ahmed Qurei during an impasse and helped hammer out a joint declaration.

He resigned from his post as chief negotiator on 12 February 2011 citing the release of the Palestine Papers. In July 2013, however, he was still holding the function. In 2015, he became the secretary-general of the Executive Committee of the Palestine Liberation Organization. He later promoted a plan for the basis for new talks with international diplomats including Jared Kushner, President Donald Trump's son-in-law and special adviser.

=== Legacy ===
Erekat was one of the more prominent Palestinian spokespeople in the Western media. He wrote extensively in the media about Palestinian statehood, and was a vocal critic of the Trump administration's peace plan.

Erekat at one time maintained good relations with his counterpart negotiators, in which Israeli justice minister Tsipi Livni mentioned that her talks with Erekat were always honest, and there was mutual respect despite frequent disagreements. In addition, Erekat took his American counterpart, Martin Indyk, on a tour of Hisham's Palace near Jericho.

== Health issues and death ==
On 8 May 2012, Erekat was hospitalized in Ramallah after suffering a heart attack.

On 12 October 2017, he had a lung transplant at Inova Fairfax Hospital in northern Virginia, United States.

Erekat, who was suffering from pulmonary fibrosis, tested positive for COVID-19 on 9 October 2020. On 18 October, he was sent to the Hadassah Ein Karem Hospital in Jerusalem in critical condition. On 21 October, his daughter said on Twitter that he underwent a bronchoscopy to examine the condition of his respiratory system. Erekat died of complications from COVID-19 on 10 November 2020, at the age of 65. He was interred in the cemetery in Jericho.

== Works ==
- Imam Ali Bin Abi Taleb and Negotiations (2015)

== See also ==
- Arab–Israeli conflict
- Israeli–Palestinian conflict
- Foreign relations of Israel
- Salah Al-Zawawi

Political offices
New office	Minister of Local Government; 1994–2003	Succeeded by Jamal Al Shobaki
New office	Minister of Negotiations Affairs; 2003–2005	Office abolished
Preceded by Ahmed Qurei	Minister of Information; 2004–2005	Succeeded by Nabil Shaath
Preceded by Yasser Abed Rabbo	Secretary General of the Executive Committee of the Palestine Liberation Organization; 2015–2020	Succeeded by Hussein al-Sheikh
