= The Haves and the Have Nots =

The Haves and the Have Nots can refer to:

- The Haves and the Have Nots (play)
- The Haves and the Have Nots (TV series)
  - List of The Haves and the Have Nots episodes
