= List of The Haves and the Have Nots episodes =

The Haves and the Have Nots is an American primetime television soap opera created, executive produced, written and directed by Tyler Perry. The premise of the series is loosely based on Perry's 2011 play The Haves and the Have Nots. Perry wrote and directed every single episode.

The series follows three families and their lifestyles as they intersect with one another in Savannah, Georgia: the rich and powerful Cryer and Harrington families (dubbed "The Haves") and the poor and destitute Young family (dubbed "The Have Nots").

== Series overview ==
Season	Episodes		Originally released	
Season	Episodes		First released	Last released
1	36	16	May 28, 2013	September 3, 2013
1	36	10	January 7, 2014	March 11, 2014
1	36	10	May 27, 2014	July 29, 2014
2	25	12	January 6, 2015	March 24, 2015
2	25	13	June 30, 2015	September 22, 2015
3	23	11	January 5, 2016	March 15, 2016
3	23	12	June 21, 2016	September 6, 2016
4	23	11	January 3, 2017	March 14, 2017
4	23	12	June 20, 2017	September 12, 2017
5	44	10	January 9, 2018	March 13, 2018
5	44	23	May 1, 2018	November 6, 2018
5	44	11	January 8, 2019	March 19, 2019
6	9		May 7, 2019	July 2, 2019
7	20	10	January 7, 2020	March 10, 2020
7	20	10	August 25, 2020	October 27, 2020
8	16	8	November 24, 2020	January 12, 2021
8	16	8	June 1, 2021	July 20, 2021

== Episodes ==
=== Season 1 (2013–14) ===
No. overall	No. in season	Title	Original release date	U.S. viewers (millions)
1	1	"The Big Surprise"	May 28, 2013	1.77
The Cryer family has prepared a surprise 50th birthday celebration for Jim, but as he arrives, he is stunned when he sees that his latest mistress, Candace, has become friendly with his daughter Amanda and is partaking in the festivities.
2	2	"Playing in the Deep End"	May 28, 2013	1.81
Jim has repeatedly requested that Candace leave the family's home, but she continues to disobey him by staying with Amanda.
3	3	"Beautifully Dysfunctional"	June 4, 2013	1.47
Candace commits some mischievous acts that put Jim's career in jeopardy.
4	4	"Entering the Race"	June 11, 2013	1.31
After Jim announces that he plans to run for Governor, Candace holds the affair against Jim and threatens to reveal the news to the media. Hanna is shocked when she discovers an eviction notice on her door.
5	5	"A Woman's Pride"	June 18, 2013	1.32
After her eviction, Hanna goes to Benny with questions regarding possibly adjusting the mortgage on her home.
6	6	"Angry Sex"	June 25, 2013	1.82
Jim falls into Candace's vindictive trap once again and David is irked by the fact that Jim is unable to control himself; Celine becomes jealous and envious of Hanna; Veronica confronts Candace.
7	7	"A True Friend"	July 2, 2013	1.54
Amanda has Wyatt and Jeffrey assist her with the move into her new apartment while Hanna is set up on a blind date by Benny.
8	8	"The Criminal"	July 9, 2013	1.56
Benny prepares for his date by asking to borrow a car, but is arrested and charged with drug possession after falling trap to someone's malicious intent; Amanda seduces her law professor to raise her grade.
9	9	"The Set Up"	July 16, 2013	1.61
Katheryn ends up bonding with Hanna over their issues.
10	10	"Number Nine"	July 23, 2013	1.80
Katheryn shames Candace directly after Jim reveals his affair.
11	11	"Not My Daughter"	July 30, 2013	1.87
Katheryn tells everyone that she is leaving for vacation, but that turns out to be false.
12	12	"In Recovery"	August 6, 2013	2.02
Jim and Candace end up in a verbal and physical altercation.
13	13	"What Are You Doing Here?"	August 13, 2013	2.14
Information is discovered by a detective that links Benny and Tony. Veronica continues to work toward answers for Benny's case.
14	14	"My Name Is Veronica"	August 20, 2013	2.05
Katheryn gets nervous when her secret almost goes public.
15	15	"The Truth Will Set You Free"	August 27, 2013	2.32
After her secret is revealed, Katheryn tells everyone what she really knows about Jim's secret activities. Jeffrey finally discloses his love for Wyatt.
16	16	"No More Hiding"	September 3, 2013	2.61
Jeffery comes out to his parents; Hanna discloses information to Benny about Tony being his father; Amanda learns about her inheritance; and Wyatt relapses and has a life-changing accident.
17	17	"The Black Sedan"	January 7, 2014	2.77
Amanda is having second thoughts about asking for her inheritance. Inside, Katheryn and Jim are arguing about Wyatt's accident. Hanna is trying to find out any information about Benny.
18	18	"Wyatt's Nightmare"	January 14, 2014	2.55
Wyatt kills a little girl after a hit-and-run, and Benny ends up on life support. Jim is unsure of what to do next once his campaign begins to fall apart. Amanda has an emotional breakdown.
19	19	"Family Issues"	January 21, 2014	2.84
Hanna disagrees with Tony's suggestion to take Benny off life support. Celine and Katheryn have a confrontation about the former's shabby treatment of Hanna.
20	20	"Unanswered Calls"	January 28, 2014	2.78
Jeffrey comes to the conclusion that Wyatt is the one who's at fault for Benny's condition and Lizzie's death.
21	21	"Why Didn't You Tell Me?"	February 4, 2014	3.50
Candace talks with Jim to have Benny relocated to a private hospital.
22	22	"Protecting Wyatt"	February 11, 2014	3.01
Jim does everything in his power to keep Wyatt from going to jail. Tony confronts Hanna and serves her with court papers.
23	23	"Amanda's Revenge"	February 18, 2014	3.21
Amanda breaks into her professor's home while his family is asleep. Candace is chosen by Hanna to represent her in court.
24	24	"Maggie's Plan"	February 25, 2014	2.88
As Jim gets ready to announce his campaign for Governor, Wyatt's behavior and warnings from Candace becomes too much to handle. First appearance: John Kap as Salvador "Sal" Malone Note: This episode marks the first appearance of John Kap as Salvador "Sal" Malone
25	25	"March for Justice"	March 4, 2014	3.04
The judge makes a decision and sides with Tony. Hanna begs Tony on her knees to keep Benny on life support.
26	26	"Starting the Race"	March 11, 2014	3.59
Candace tries once again to blackmail Jim and David during their campaign event. Wyatt finally gets arrested.
27	27	"You'll Be Sorry"	May 27, 2014	3.11
Wyatt is arrested. Candace is kidnapped by the Malones. Benny shows signs of brain activity.
28	28	"The Confession"	June 3, 2014	2.62
Jim conspires to save his son; Amanda gets a gun; Benny improves.
29	29	"Donald"	June 10, 2014	2.42
Jim proclaims his son's innocence; Quincy pays Hanna a surprise visit in search of Candace.
30	30	"The Awakening"	June 17, 2014	2.81
Benny wakes up from his coma.
31	31	"The Vulnerable"	June 24, 2014	2.92
Benny prepares for his release from the hospital; Hanna plans to testify against Wyatt; Maggie tries to seduce David.
32	32	"The Sarandon Hotel"	July 1, 2014	3.47
After escaping her kidnappers, Candace asks Warlock for help; Jeffrey is seduced by Melissa.
33	33	"Again and Again"	July 8, 2014	3.32
David is compromised. Jim is plotting. Candace is panicking.
34	34	"Something's Wrong With Amanda"	July 15, 2014	3.26
Amanda leaves the Cryer estate with Quincy. Candace hides out at Jeffrey's apartment. Katheryn and Celine get into another confrontation. Benny has conversation with Tony and later tries to restore peace between Hanna and Candace.
35	35	"Norman Hewens"	July 22, 2014	2.86
A news report claiming that another person is responsible for the hit-and-run saves Wyatt from jail. Katheryn berates Jim about his evil deeds. Hanna attempts to apologize to Jim for her hand in the tragedy, but he won't have it and orders her off his property; however, Katheryn has a tearful and beautiful reunion with her best friend, and offers Hanna her job back and to begin after Benny is settled in. Katheryn then tells Jim off about his attitude towards Hanna and orders him to keep Celine under control or else.
36	36	"Checkmate"	July 29, 2014	3.49
Jim is confronted by Carlos, his illegitimate son with Celine. Katheryn's celebratory dinner party goes awry when Quincy, Candace's ex, shows up as Amanda's date. David and Veronica continue to battle over the fact that Jeffrey is gay. Candace seeks her revenge on Jim. Maggie makes another attempt to sleep with David. Last appearance: Jaclyn Betham as Amanda Cryer Note: This episode marks the last appearance of Jaclyn Betham as Amanda Cryer

=== Season 2 (2015) ===
No. overall	No. in season	Title	Original release date	U.S. viewers (millions)
37	1	"The Power Dance"	January 6, 2015	3.22
Hanna hosts a party for Benny upon his homecoming from the hospital; Jim is being held hostage by Warlock under Candace's orders.
38	2	"The War Room"	January 13, 2015	2.91
Hanna seeks information about Quincy's mother so she can get one step closer to finding her grandson; Maggie continues her pursuit of David.
39	3	"A Southern Brawl"	January 20, 2015	2.60
Veronica and Maggie fight but David manages to pull them apart.
40	4	"Amanda's Room"	January 27, 2015	2.98
Jim gives up and finally gives in to Candace's demands.
41	5	"The Press Conference"	February 3, 2015	2.89
Everyone prepares for Jim's announcement for Governor but he is nowhere to be found other than still being held against his will by Candace. Katheryn gets some devastating news. First appearance: Brett Davis Mitchell "Mitch" Malone Note: This episode marks the first appearance of Brett Davis as Mitchell "Mitch" Malone
42	6	"A Tragic Day"	February 10, 2015	3.42
Everyone else is assembled at the Cryer mansion during a family tragedy.
43	7	"April 7, 1979"	February 17, 2015	3.22
Katheryn tells the story of how she first met Jim.
44	8	"In Crisis"	February 24, 2015	3.28
Emotions and rage get the best of Jim and Wyatt; Katheryn and David try to tell Veronica how wrong she is about Jeffery.
45	9	"A Talk with Jim"	March 3, 2015	2.90
Benny is convinced that Candace has changed her ways; Hanna comforts Katheryn.
46	10	"Oscar"	March 10, 2015	3.02
Hanna comforts Jim after Amanda's death; Candace meets a new guy.
47	11	"Unglued"	March 17, 2015	3.02
Katheryn and Jim plan for a divorce; Candace buys a new house; David is angry at Veronica for telling Quincy to beat up Jeffery; Veronica goes to the Sarandon Hotel and causes big trouble, especially since she thinks that Maggie is trying to steal David from her.
48	12	"Enough is Enough"	March 24, 2015	3.50
Benny searches for Quincy after he shows up at Hanna's home.
49	13	"Two Funerals"	June 30, 2015	3.29
Veronica starts a fire that destroys her mansion and almost claims David's life.
50	14	"In Memoriam"	July 7, 2015	2.79
The Cryer family prepares for Amanda's funeral; Wyatt's confession to D.A. Sallison sparks controversy.
51	15	"Nine Lives"	July 14, 2015	3.17
Hanna finds out that Jim and Katheryn were holding Candace hostage.
52	16	"The Cougar"	July 21, 2015	2.85
Hanna covers for Benny after she discovers him in bed with Veronica.
53	17	"Candace Young, Esq."	July 28, 2015	3.01
Candace shows Benny where she works.
54	18	"Benny Does Battle"	August 4, 2015	3.17
Quincy is hurt from the accident involving Benny.
55	19	"Quincy Jr."	August 11, 2015	3.12
Hanna is reunited with Q.
56	20	"A Home For Q"	August 18, 2015	3.06
Candace learns that Hanna is seeking custody of Q; and the Cryers and Harringtons try to convince the D.A. that Wyatt's taped confession is a misunderstanding.
57	21	"Candace's Closing"	August 25, 2015	3.19
Candace buys property with the money she extorted from Jim; and Jim is interviewed on TV.
58	22	"Dianna Whinchil"	September 1, 2015	3.23
While Jim is being interviewed by Dianna Whinchil, a surprise guest arrives. Veronica tells Jim that she had planned Wyatt's attack in prison, leading Jim to attack her and later put a hit on her, Professor Cannon, and Prison Guard Terrell by calling three hitmen and ordering a "bloodbath."
59	23	"Vetted"	September 8, 2015	3.28
Hanna grows suspicious of Benny's involvement with Veronica and how he acquired his new house; Quincy drives a car through Hanna's home in spite of revenge; Candace decides to let her guard down around Oscar.
60	24	"Sheep's Clothing"	September 15, 2015	3.13
Hanna becomes devastated when she learns that Quincy set her house on fire; Maggie tries to talk David into running for Governor; Jeffrey gives Wyatt the necessary ammunition to take his parents down.
61	25	"When The Chickens Come Home"	September 22, 2015	3.71
Hanna and Benny force Candace to tell the truth about everything; Oscar reveals his true colors to Candace.

=== Season 3 (2016) ===
No. overall	No. in season	Title	Original release date	U.S. viewers (millions)
62	1	"The Waters Run Deep"	January 5, 2016	3.11
Candace and Jeffery face Quincy; the Cryers and Harringtons deal with the consequences of their actions.
63	2	"Paid In Full"	January 12, 2016	2.73
Candace and Jeffery get a visit from the police because of a nosy neighbor.
64	3	"The Right Medicine"	January 19, 2016	2.94
Hanna discovers about her grandson's medical troubles.
65	4	"An Evil Soul"	January 26, 2016	3.02
Candace's lies catch up with her when she receives a visit from Warlock.
66	5	"Immunity"	February 2, 2016	2.90
Benny agrees to help Candace hide evidence in Quincy's murder.
67	6	"Making Millions"	February 9, 2016	2.81
Hanna's grandson has medical issues that have caused him major problems and she finally finds out about them.
68	7	"A Front Row Seat"	February 16, 2016	2.95
Maggie's lie to David could cause her to lose him forever; Katheryn gets out of jail but she can't find anyone to help Jim or Veronica; Candace enlists Erica's help to plot for revenge.
69	8	"Unexpected Visitors"	February 23, 2016	3.07
Candace interrogates the social worker; Hanna is staking out at Cryer's mansion waiting for their return; Katheryn goes to visit David but little does she know that Wyatt is one step closer to getting his inheritance; Benny confronts David.
70	9	"I Choose My Son"	March 1, 2016	2.80
Quita and Daylon break into Candace's house but are caught by Pearl, who calls her son Justin and his police squad to arrest them; Justin continues to harass Jeffery; Upon Wyatt's confession on hitting her son, Hanna confronts Katheryn.
71	10	"Beg For What You Need"	March 8, 2016	2.64
Candace puts a plan into action to save herself and Benny from War's rage. Katheryn pleads with Hanna to not end their friendship. Veronica handles the hired assassin hiding in her house in an unexpected manner.
72	11	"48 Hours"	March 15, 2016	2.85
Warlock has pushed up Candace's due date, so she goes to the bank to mortgage the houses and Benny's tow yard.
73	12	"My Friend Maggie"	June 21, 2016	2.85
Maggie visits Veronica's home and gets the surprise of her life.
74	13	"Criminology 101"	June 28, 2016	2.63
Veronica treats David with much malice.
75	14	"Giving Candy To A Baby"	July 5, 2016	2.70
After talking with Pearl, Hanna hopes to gain custody of Quincy Jr.
76	15	"The Apple Tree"	July 12, 2016	2.64
Katheryn tries to process difficult news about one of her closest family members.
77	16	"The Heart of a Man"	July 19, 2016	2.70
Veronica and Jeffery go to visit Katheryn but Veronica pushes Jeffery to his limit.
78	17	"An Accident"	July 26, 2016	3.05
Jeffrey begins to implode so he calls Candace and Justin for help.
79	18	"A Tragic Assumption"	August 2, 2016	3.02
Jennifer arrives at Katheryn's house to tell her that Wyatt is alive.
80	19	"I Am Wolf"	August 9, 2016	2.89
Jim teams up with a former enemy in his scheme against Candace.
81	20	"Back In Business"	August 16, 2016	2.93
Mitch breaks up the fight between David and Benny; David gets some shocking information about Mitch.
82	21	"The Fugitive"	August 23, 2016	2.95
The police are on the look out for Hanna so they question Candace and Benny.
83	22	"The Silk Handkerchief"	August 30, 2016	2.95
Benny learns the truth of how Candace financed his property and is heartbroken.
84	23	"Promises Kept"	September 6, 2016	3.24
Katheryn explodes when she is pushed to the limit.

=== Season 4 (2017) ===
No. overall	No. in season	Title	Original release date	U.S. viewers (millions)
85	1	"A Cup of Tea"	January 3, 2017	2.99
Veronica tries to escape the Cryer mansion after the murder of D.A. Jennifer Sallison. Jeffery is still trying to get a hold of Candace, who is out on the search for Oscar. Benny is still upset because of how Candace mortgaged his house and the tow yard.
86	2	"Waiting for Candace"	January 10, 2017	2.16
Veronica and Katheryn have a fight. Benny holds hope that Candace will come through with the money.
87	3	"It's Ok to Love"	January 17, 2017	2.68
Veronica is still trying to escape Katheryn's house. Erica calls Candace to give her an update on things with David.
88	4	"A Mother's Wisdom"	January 24, 2017	2.36
Veronica wants to meet with Candace and Jeffery. Jim returns home to help Katheryn clean up a mess she has created. Benny gets evicted from his home.
89	5	"Brilliant Lawyers Lurking"	January 31, 2017	2.70
Veronica helps Candace and Jeffery out of a precarious predicament.
90	6	"A Hurricane Offshore"	February 7, 2017	2.75
Veronica pays Erica a visit. Candace encounters Oscar again. Quita finds Wyatt's place and tells him that she's going to take his money.
91	7	"Pieces of The Puzzle"	February 14, 2017	2.58
Veronica lets Jim know that if anything happens to her she has dirt on him. Hanna questions Benny and Candace about what they did to Quincy.
92	8	"Praying for Light"	February 21, 2017	2.76
Hanna does all she can to keep the peace in her family.
93	9	"We All Need Forgiveness"	February 28, 2017	2.33
Veronica tells Justin to stay away from Jeffery. Candace makes Charles her latest Mark.
94	10	"Forget The Bubble"	March 7, 2017	2.41
Veronica is pushing Jeffery's buttons. Erica is caught sleeping with David by War.
95	11	"In Pursuit of Prey"	March 14, 2017	3.20
Veronica tries to seduce Benny. Warlock looks for Candace and Erica reveals her true colors. Mitch returns from jail. Katheryn leaves Jim. Wyatt checks himself into rehab of his own volition.
96	12	"The Fallout From War"	June 20, 2017	2.68
In the aftermath of the shootout it is revealed that Quincy Jr is dead. Veronica goes in a rage after Melissa attempts suicide in her bed.
97	13	"My Grandson's War"	June 27, 2017	2.44
Veronica and Katheryn came face-to-face. Katheryn was able to be the friend that Hanna needed in comfort; Mama Rose inflict a bit of fear into Jim.
98	14	"Mad Day"	July 11, 2017	2.33
Veronica intervened and proved her skills by representing Benny. Jim taunts Veronica. Hanna found herself at Katheryn's new rental home.
99	15	"A Woman Under the Stairs"	July 18, 2017	2.43
Veronica threatens to reveal Officer Justin's secret and accuses him of sexually harassing Jeffrey. David and Jim find their sons. Charles reveals to Candace who he really is.
100	16	"Railroad"	July 25, 2017	2.43
Veronica visits Melissa at the hospital. Katheryn helps Hanna deal with Benny's situation. Wyatt gets released from the hospital. Charles beats Candace at her own game.
101	17	"Elevator Seven"	August 1, 2017	2.30
Veronica confronts Erica and David on the elevator about their relationship.
102	18	"A Broken Mirror"	August 8, 2017	2.33
Veronica catches Officer Justin in Jeffrey's hotel room, and records Officer Justin. Jim is trying to find Warlock before Mamma Rose does.
103	19	"Haunted By The Surname"	August 15, 2017	2.40
Veronica is confronted by Officer Justin. Candace starts to see Erica for who she truly is. Candace gets some devastating news about her son, Quincy Jr.
104	20	"The Enemy Called Trust"	August 22, 2017	2.52
Candace seeks revenge after a devastating loss. First appearance: Derek Russo as Tony Malone Note: This episode marks the first appearance of Derek Russo as Tony Malone
105	21	"Kate"	August 29, 2017	2.64
Jim and Katheryn explode with emotion as Jim pleads with her for retribution.
106	22	"For The Team"	September 5, 2017	2.61
Jim works to mend fences for the greater good.
107	23	"The Veronica Show"	September 12, 2017	2.58
The Young family are all at odds with each other during a visit to the funeral home. Veronica does something that puts Officer Justin at rage. Candace struggles with sorrow and the death of Quincy Jr. Jim confronts Candace at The Artesian Hotel.

=== Season 5 (2018–19) ===
No. overall	No. in season	Title	Original release date	U.S. viewers (millions)
108	1	"Afraid of Flames"	January 9, 2018	2.30
Hanna is in mourning after the deadly shooting of her grandson; Candace rejects Benny's pleas to help her; Veronica and Melissa find themselves in a dangerous situation.
109	2	"Searching For A Mother's Love"	January 16, 2018	2.34
Benny and Mitch risk their lives to save victims of a horrific auto accident; Justin professes his love and lust for Jeffery.
110	3	"Undercover Vice"	January 23, 2018	2.25
David learns of Jeffrey's whereabouts; Hanna and Benny confront Candace.
111	4	"The Lion"	January 30, 2018	2.20
Hanna reveals a deep, dark secret; David calls upon Katheryn for help with Jeffrey.
112	5	"Errand Boy"	February 6, 2018	2.17
Justin continues his pursuit of Jeffery; Candace and Benny fight to keep their strong sibling relationship.
113	6	"Hanna's Tea"	February 13, 2018	2.24
Veronica returns home after her stay in the hospital; Candace and Jeffrey's murder of Quincy catches up with them and are faced with some serious consequences; Katheryn shows her new home to Hanna, where she meets a new man.
114	7	"Every Six Months"	February 20, 2018	2.24
Candace gets released from jail while David fights to get Jeffrey out. First appearance: Oscar Torre as Vinny Malone Note: This episode marks the first appearance of Oscar Torre as Vinny Malone
115	8	"Wicked"	February 27, 2018	2.02
Sarah and George make progress in prosecuting the Cryers; Veronica concocts a scheme against David.
116	9	"An Eye For An Eye"	March 6, 2018	2.03
David confronts Hanna about Benny and Jeffery; Charles is determined to see Candace; Veronica learns that Melissa has been drinking while pregnant; Hanna learns of Benny's recent encounter with Veronica; Katheryn confronts Jim about Jennifer Sallison; Wyatt learns about Jeffery being in jail.
117	10	"A Lover's Passions"	March 13, 2018	2.08
Candace works on a new plan to recoup her money from the Cryers; Veronica is preoccupied by an all-consuming desire for revenge; Hanna gets ready for her date with Derrick.
118	11	"Veronica's House"	May 1, 2018	1.55
Veronica finds out that David moved Erica into her dream home and also lets David know that she is the only queen in the world to reclaim her kingdom; Candace reverts to her old ways by drugging Oscar's drink in order to get her money back; Veronica and Justin have another confrontation; Hanna goes out on her date with Derrick; Melissa seduces Benny again; and Wyatt has a major relapse that spirals out of control.
119	12	"In His Eyes"	May 8, 2018	1.74
After Veronica catches Benny with Melissa in her house the two get into a fight, forcing Veronica to throw Melissa out, leaving her with no place to go. This prompts Benny to let Melissa stay with him; Hanna encounters singer Stephanie Mills on her date; Wyatt is forced to make a life-threatening decision; Candace enacts her new money scheme like a boss; Jim and Katheryn come to a revelation about their bad parenting skills; Justin tries to make Jeffery jealous; and Candace panics when Oscar won't wake up after finding him totally unconscious.
120	13	"The Right Cocktail"	May 15, 2018	1.72
After Candace revives Oscar, she reminds him of her getting her money back; Veronica makes Jeffery an unexpected offer; Wyatt's situation lands him in hot water; Candace decided to drop Gia after learning her money deposit is processing; Hanna gives Melissa advice regarding her and the baby; Veronica schemes to get back at Benny; and Hanna returns to work.
121	14	"The Rabbit and the Water Moccasin"	May 22, 2018	1.79
Wyatt learns the advantage and disadvantage of drug use.
122	15	"The Third Quarter"	May 29, 2018	1.90
Benny wants to return the money to the Malones but discovers it's not that simple. First appearance: Michael Galante as Sandy Malone Note: This episode marks the first appearance of Michael Galante as Sandy Malone
123	16	"No Honor In This Game"	June 5, 2018	1.81
Katheryn learns that Wyatt's anger for her comes from deep childhood scars.
124	17	"The Broken Washer"	June 12, 2018	1.80
Veronica and Candace scheme up a plan to hurt David.
125	18	"Sugar Mamma"	June 19, 2018	1.92
Officer Justin shows Jeffery just how serious he is about being with him.
126	19	"Team of Rivals"	June 26, 2018	1.95
David is pushed to a point by Veronica that he didn't know he had.
127	20	"Smitten"	July 3, 2018	1.65
Charles learns that Landon may have ulterior motives.
128	21	"Moles"	July 10, 2018	1.95
Benny's arrest forces Candace to return to her old tricks to make some quick cash to leave town.
129	22	"Til Death Do Us Part"	July 17, 2018	2.21
Candace and Jim are up to their old tricks; people are caught in the crossfire of Veronica's wicked plots and intimidations.
130	23	"The Road to Hell"	August 14, 2018	1.92
After being pushed to the limit, Veronica finally gets her revenge.
131	24	"The Black Dress"	August 21, 2018	1.90
David learns Erica's fate while being rushed to the hospital; the truth about Mitch's uncle comes out, and the Malones now have a new target.
132	25	"A Father's Regret"	August 28, 2018	2.06
An explosion in this small town sets more on fire than just a car.
133	26	"The Damned Defibrillator"	September 4, 2018	1.84
While David remains in the hospital, Veronica gets a surprising shock of her own.
134	27	"Laugh Not To Cry"	September 11, 2018	2.11
Veronica convinces RK to do some of her dirty work.
135	28	"Stronger Together"	October 2, 2018	1.65
Candace's plans begins to unravel as Benny learns of what she did to Hanna.
136	29	"The Black Man...."	October 9, 2018	1.78
Jim tries to save Wyatt from jail, and Jeffrey deals with an unexpected guest.
137	30	"Three's a Crowd"	October 16, 2018	1.72
Candace comes face-to-face with Katheryn Cryer.
138	31	"The Chosen"	October 23, 2018	1.73
Charles, the future president of the United States is back and chooses Candace.
139	32	"The Committee"	October 30, 2018	1.83
Jeffery's scare with David brings him closer to Nurse Madison as the FBI gets one step closer to Veronica's wicked trail.
140	33	"Exhausted"	November 6, 2018	1.72
Jim thinks that he's holding of all of the cards, but there is a ticking time bomb coming his way.
141	34	"Speak Through It"	January 8, 2019	1.69
Benny is severely rushed to the hospital following a shooting incident and Mitch reveals to Hanna about what happened with him. Katheryn attempts to mix business with pleasure. Veronica is taken to the hospital after falling off a stairwell railing and the FBI pays her a little visit.
142	35	"Battle For The Past"	January 15, 2019	1.75
Secrets are revealed when everyone comes together at the hospital.
143	36	"A Good Man"	January 22, 2019	1.83
Justin will stop at nothing to make sure Jeffrey is his.
144	37	"The Surgeon"	January 29, 2019	1.88
Veronica is simmering, and someone is going to get burned.
145	38	"Power Struggle"	February 5, 2019	1.55
Justin focuses on Jeffrey with laser-like intensity; Katheryn gets a taste of what it's like on the other side of the tracks.
146	39	"From the Seventies"	February 12, 2019	1.75
Wyatt is in jail; the Cryers secrets may make it out before he does.
147	40	"Room Three"	February 19, 2019	1.83
Jeffery comes to Justin's aid.
148	41	"Enough"	February 26, 2019	1.82
Jeffery tries to handle the Justin situation amicably.
149	42	"Morning"	March 5, 2019	1.69
Wyatt takes the witness stand intent on revenge.
150	43	"Fifteen Minutes"	March 12, 2019	1.80
The Harringtons and the Cryers must join forces in order to save them all.
151	44	"Out of Time"	March 19, 2019	1.89
A tattoo is worth a thousand words.

=== Season 6 (2019) ===
No. overall	No. in season	Title	Original release date	U.S. viewers (millions)
152	1	"A Wicked Web"	May 7, 2019	1.52
Details about Hanna's past are unraveled; Officer Justin finally gets Jeffery to himself; Candace and Charles have a very special dinner where things quickly get complicated.
153	2	"Dessert"	May 14, 2019	1.44
Some dinners end with dessert, but not at Officer Justin's house.
154	3	"Spanish Moss Trail"	May 21, 2019	1.40
Madison intercepts an ominous call at the hospital.
155	4	"Tomorrow's Not Promised"	May 28, 2019	1.56
A brush with death disrupts the Harrington Family.
156	5	"Second Chances"	June 4, 2019	1.62
Veronica faces off with Officer Justin while Scott builds his case against Candace.
157	6	"On the Edge"	June 11, 2019	1.49
No one is safe from the danger looming in the city of Savannah, Ga.
158	7	"A New Leaf"	June 18, 2019	1.93
Candace plans to turn over a new leaf.
159	8	"She's Gonna Be Real Mad"	June 25, 2019	1.85
David's blunder has deadly consequences; Candace loses something precious to her.
160	9	"Show Not Tell"	July 2, 2019	1.85
Veronica and Wyatt retaliate against their enemies.

=== Season 7 (2020) ===
No. overall	No. in season	Title	Original release date	U.S. viewers (millions)
161	1	"Are You Happy?"	January 7, 2020	1.62
Candace questions her motives after Charles disappoints her.
162	2	"Fleeting Moments"	January 14, 2020	1.50
Startling news about the Cryers has rocked the people of Savannah.
163	3	"Pray To Me"	January 21, 2020	1.49
Katheryn has to face the consequences of a past transgression.
164	4	"Evil Offspring"	January 28, 2020	1.61
Everyone tries to find their footing in the wake of Jim's hospitalization.
165	5	"Jimmy Crack Corn"	February 4, 2020	1.52
Candace confronts Jim after Benny's disappearance.
166	6	"Mister Jim"	February 11, 2020	1.50
Jim employs criminal tactics to get his money back from Candace.
167	7	"A Change of Heart"	February 18, 2020	1.57
Mitch saves Benny with a desperate plea to his Malone family members.
168	8	"The Heavy Lifting"	February 25, 2020	1.53
Veronica devises a plan to take revenge against Jim.
169	9	"Boom Boom Bang"	March 3, 2020	1.37
Wyatt has a nervous breakdown after the pressure continues to mount.
170	10	"Bananas Foster"	March 10, 2020	1.37
Jim plots revenge.
171	11	"Power of Attorney"	August 25, 2020	1.06
Hanna decides to stand her ground and gets the answers she needs.
172	12	"One Way or Another"	August 25, 2020	1.23
Vinny is determined to get Mama Rose out of jail one way or another.
173	13	"Fine Together"	September 1, 2020	1.12
Ulterior motives lead to destruction.
174	14	"Someone Special"	September 8, 2020	1.17
The Young family is forced to face their demons.
175	15	"The Executor"	September 15, 2020	1.26
Wyatt's actions send Jim and Katheryn into a frenzy.
176	16	"Counting The Costs"	September 22, 2020	1.16
Wyatt's addiction leaves him spiraling.
177	17	"No More Time"	October 6, 2020	1.14
Benny sets out on a self-appointed investigation.
178	18	"A Sixth Sense"	October 13, 2020	1.12
Landon attempts to help Charles in an attempt to regain his trust.
179	19	"Father's Day"	October 20, 2020	1.23
Veronica makes moves to stay ahead of her enemies.
180	20	"The Reaping"	October 27, 2020	1.24
Veronica does whatever it takes to get what she wants.

=== Season 8 (2020–21) ===
No. overall	No. in season	Title	Original release date	U.S. viewers (millions)
181	1	"The Long Game"	November 24, 2020	0.88
A shy fox tries to set David up, but he is smarter and faster.
182	2	"Power of the Purse"	December 1, 2020	1.13
Jim schemes on getting revenge.
183	3	"The Long Drive Home"	December 8, 2020	0.97
Hanna embraces her new role, and is fearless as she must confront hatred.
184	4	"The Appointment"	December 15, 2020	1.20
Veronica seeks to form a deadly alliance.
185	5	"A Little Bird"	December 22, 2020	1.06
Katheryn wields her powers to seek revenge, and to help the "Have Nots".
186	6	"The Family's Name"	December 29, 2020	1.12
David does the unthinkable to prove to help his longtime friend.
187	7	"A Working Girl"	January 5, 2021	1.12
Hanna stands her ground against Jim.
188	8	"A Showdown"	January 12, 2021	1.11
Veronica plots her biggest revenge of all time.
189	9	"A Game of Chess"	June 1, 2021	0.88
Hanna proves she is just as strong as the rich and powerful.
190	10	"Wolves"	June 8, 2021	0.89
Shocking secrets are brought to light.
191	11	"Black Panther"	June 15, 2021	0.92
Benny pursues a new interest.
192	12	"Hidden Bones"	June 22, 2021	0.87
Benny strikes up a new enemy.
193	13	"Pink Unicorns"	June 29, 2021	0.90
Mitch faces up to the consequences of his actions.
194	14	"Trespassing"	July 6, 2021	0.94
Candace reveals a life-changing secret to Charles.
195	15	"Trouble Man"	July 13, 2021	0.95
Wyatt's actions finally catches up with him.
196	16	"Dark Intentions"	July 20, 2021	1.18
In the Series Finale, troubling revelations put everyone's lives in danger.

== Ratings ==
The Haves and the Have Nots : U.S. viewers per episode (millions)

Season	Episode number																																											
Season	1	2	3	4	5	6	7	8	9	10	11	12	13	14	15	16	17	18	19	20	21	22	23	24	25	26	27	28	29	30	31	32	33	34	35	36	37	38	39	40	41	42	43	44
1	1.77	1.81	1.47	1.31	1.32	1.82	1.54	1.56	1.61	1.80	1.87	2.02	2.14	2.05	2.32	2.61	2.77	2.55	2.84	2.78	3.50	3.01	3.21	2.88	3.04	3.59	3.11	2.62	2.42	2.81	2.92	3.47	3.32	3.26	2.86	3.49	–							
2	3.22	2.91	2.60	2.98	2.89	3.42	3.22	3.28	2.90	3.02	3.02	3.50	3.29	2.79	3.17	2.85	3.01	3.17	3.12	3.06	3.19	3.23	3.28	3.13	3.71	–																		
3	3.11	2.73	2.94	3.02	2.90	2.81	2.95	3.07	2.80	2.64	2.85	2.85	2.63	2.70	2.64	2.70	3.05	3.02	2.89	2.93	2.95	2.95	3.24	–																				
4	2.99	2.16	2.68	2.36	2.70	2.75	2.58	2.76	2.33	2.41	3.20	2.68	2.44	2.33	2.43	2.43	2.30	2.33	2.40	2.52	2.64	2.61	2.58	–																				
5	2.30	2.34	2.25	2.20	2.17	2.24	2.24	2.02	2.03	2.08	1.55	1.74	1.72	1.79	1.90	1.81	1.80	1.92	1.95	1.65	1.95	2.21	1.92	1.90	2.06	1.84	2.11	1.65	1.78	1.72	1.73	1.83	1.72	1.69	1.75	1.83	1.88	1.55	1.75	1.83	1.82	1.69	1.80	1.89
6	1.52	1.44	1.40	1.56	1.62	1.49	1.93	1.85	1.85	–																																		
7	1.62	1.50	1.49	1.61	1.52	1.50	1.57	1.53	1.37	1.37	1.06	1.23	1.12	1.17	1.26	1.16	1.14	1.12	1.23	1.24	–																							
8	0.87	1.12	0.97	1.20	1.06	1.12	1.12	1.10	0.87	0.89	0.92	0.87	0.90	0.94	0.95	1.18	–																											

Audience measurement performed by Nielsen Media Research
