= Eva Tamargo =

American actress

- Born: Brooklyn, New York, U.S.
- Occupation: Actress
- Years active: 1994-present

Eva Tamargo is an American actress, best known for her roles as Pilar Lopez-Fitzgerald on the NBC daytime soap opera Passions (1999—2008), and as Celine Gonzales in the Oprah Winfrey Network primetime soap opera The Haves and the Have Nots (2013–2021).

== Life and career ==
Tamargo was born in Brooklyn, New York, to Cuban immigrants. She was married to Michael Lemus from 1985 to 2003 and is sometimes credited as "Eva Tamargo Lemus". She is the daughter of the Cuban journalist Agustin Tamargo and Rosalba Nápoles. She has two children, Matthew and Gabriella.

From 1999 to 2008, Tamargo played Pilar Lopez-Fitzgerald in NBC soap opera Passions. Tamargo is also known in the international Latino community for her work on the daytime telenovela El Magnate as well as the reality dating show La Cenicienta. She has appeared in television, radio and print commercials as well as stage work with the Repertorio Español in New York City. She also starred in Marielena and Más Sabe el Diablo, and a guest appearance on NCIS.

In 2013, Tamargo was cast as Celine Gonzales, the spiteful domestic of John Schneider and Reneé Lawless in Oprah Winfrey Network primetime soap opera The Haves and the Have Nots. As of June 2020, Tamargo signed an exclusive management deal with Chris Giovanni at CGEM Talent in Los Angeles.

== Filmography ==
Year	Title	Role	Notes
1994	El silencio de Neto	Elena Yepes	
1994	Marielena	Cecilia	Series regular
1999	Any Given Sunday	Tunnel Reporter	
2007	Saints & Sinners	Helen	3 episodes
1999–2008	Passions	Pilar Lopez-Fitzgerald	Series regular Nominated - ALMA Award for Outstanding Actress in a Daytime Drama (2002, 2008)
2009	NCIS	Adrianna Lopez	Episode: "Love & War"
2009–2010	Más Sabe el Diablo	Arianna de Dávila	180 episodes
2010	El fantasma de Elena	Mariela Lafé	3 episodes
2011	No Me Hallo	Leonor	15 episodes
2012	El Talismán	María Rivera	2 episodes
2012	Our Boys	Angelica	
2013–2015, 2020–2021	The Haves and the Have Nots	Celine Gonzales	Series regular (seasons 1–3, season 7–8)
2014	The First	Madre	
2014	The Lookout	Sandra Allen	
2014	Cosita linda	Telma Lujan	Recurring role
2016	American Bred	Catalina Adamo	
2021	Rebel	Sharon Cruz	Episodes: "Race" and "36 Hours"
2022	Cut, Color, Murder	Carol Bowden	Television film
2023	NCIS: Los Angeles	Carmen Perez	Episode: "Maybe Today"
