= Gavin Houston =

American actor (born 1977)

- Born: Gavin Alexander Houston; December 10, 1977 (age 48); Brooklyn, New York, U.S.
- Occupation: Actor
- Years active: 1992–present
- Children: 1

Gavin Alexander Houston (born December 10, 1977) is an American actor, best known for playing the role of Jeffrey Harrington on the Oprah Winfrey Network primetime television soap opera, The Haves and the Have Nots from 2013 to 2021. He is also known for role as Remy Boudreau on the CBS daytime soap opera Guiding Light (2002-2006).

== Life and career ==
Born in Brooklyn and raised in Teaneck, New Jersey, Houston is the son of Lloyd and Colette Houston. He has an older sister named Tonza. Houston also has a daughter. After graduating from the University of Florida, Houston studied at the Manhattan Theatre Club. He began his career as a child actor appearing in commercials, and an episode of The Cosby Show. From 2002 to 2006, he was regular cast member on the CBS daytime soap opera Guiding Light playing the role of Remy Boudreau. He later had a recurring role on the ABC soap opera General Hospital, also guest-starred on Wizards of Waverly Place and Without a Trace.

In 2013, Houston began starring as Jeffrey Harrington on the Oprah Winfrey Network primetime television soap opera, The Haves and the Have Nots. The series ended in 2021 after 8 seasons. In 2016 he appeared in the Lifetime movie Toni Braxton: Unbreak My Heart playing Babyface, and in 2018 guest starred on Grey's Anatomy.

== Filmography ==
=== Film ===
Year	Title	Role	Notes
2011	Spy	Mike Chase	
2011	The Rum Diary	Sailor	
2014	Presumed Dead in Paradise	Blake	TV movie
2016	Toni Braxton: Unbreak My Heart	Babyface	TV movie
2016	The Secret She Kept	Lance	TV movie
2017	Me + 1	Nathan Ramirez	Short
2018	Con Man	Hulking Jock	
2023	Safeword	Ethan	TV Movie
2023	Dance For Me	Osiris Hughs	TV Movie
2026	Single Black Female 3: The Final Chapter	Walter	TV movie

=== Television ===
Year	Title	Role	Notes
2002-06	Guiding Light	Remy Boudreau	Regular Cast
2007	The Singles Table	Rick	Episode: "The Emergency"
2008	Wizards of Waverly Place	Paul	Episode: "Credit Check"
2008	Without a Trace	Vince	Episode: "Rewind"
2010	General Hospital	Sly Thomas	Recurring role
2023	General Hospital	Zeke Robinson	Guest star
2010-14	The Bay	Tony Foster	Recurring cast: season 1 & 3
2013-21	The Haves and the Have Nots	Jeffrey Harrington	Main cast
2015	Rizzoli & Isles	Alphonse	Episode: "Fake It 'Til You Make It"
2018	Grey's Anatomy	Ed Benson	Episode: "Fight For Your Mind"
2021	Shameless	Officer Paul Sikes	Episode: "Two at a Biker Bar, One in the Lake"
2021-22	Roswell, New Mexico	Theodore	Recurring cast: season 2-3
2022	NCIS: Los Angeles	Wesley Roberts	Episode: "Hard for the Money"
