= Lex Scott Davis =

American actress

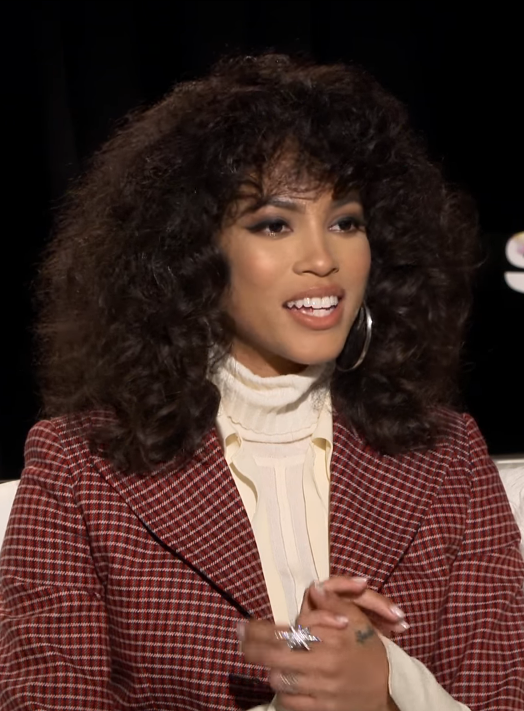
- Davis in 2018
- Born: Alexis Scott Davis; February 26, 1991 (age 35); Baltimore, Maryland, U.S.
- Occupation: Actress
- Years active: 2014–present
- Spouse: Mo McRae (m. 2019)
- Children: 2

Alexis Scott Davis (born February 26, 1991) is an American actress. She is known for playing Nya in The First Purge and Toni Braxton in the 2016 Lifetime television film Toni Braxton: Unbreak My Heart. In 2017, she had a starring role in the short-lived CBS drama series Training Day. She played Quiara in The L Word: Generation Q.

== Early life ==
Davis was born in Baltimore, Maryland, to a life coach mother and a real estate firm owner father. She graduated from Roland Park Country School. She attended Drexel University as a Dance and Physical Therapy major before she moved to New York City in 2013 and continued her studies at the New York Film Academy.

== Career ==
In 2015, Davis was cast as Toni Braxton in the Lifetime television movie Toni Braxton: Unbreak My Heart. After making her television debut with this role, she next co-starred in the single season of the CBS crime drama series Training Day.

In 2018, Davis made her big screen debut with starring roles in three films: the action film Superfly, the horror film The First Purge, and the legal drama Foster Boy. In 2018, Davis also played a leading role in the ABC pilot for the magic-mystery drama For Love, that was not picked up to series. The following year, she was cast in a recurring role in the Showtime drama series The L Word: Generation Q. In 2020, she was cast as Katey Sagal's title character's daughter in the ABC series Rebel. Later that year, she was cast in the film A Lot of Nothing directed by Mo McRae. She also starred in The Roku Channel comedy series The Now.

== Personal life ==
Davis married actor Mo McRae on July 21, 2019, after less than a year of being engaged. They had an "unplugged" wedding to ensure that all of their guests were "present in the moment" as they shared personalized vows. The couple met on the set of The First Purge. They have two children, born in 2020 and 2022.

== Filmography ==
=== Film ===
Year	Title	Role	Notes
2014	ColorBlind	Lili	Short film
2016	The Reunion	Sasha	Short film
2018	Superfly	Georgia	
2018	The First Purge	Nya	
2019	Foster Boy	Keisha James	
2020	Son of the South	Joanne	
2021	Sweet Girl	FBI Detective Sarah Meeker	
2022	A Lot of Nothing	Candy	
2024	Ricky Stanicky	Erin	

=== Television ===
Year	Title	Role	Notes
2015	The Exes	Waitress	Episode: "Along Came Holly"
2016	Toni Braxton: Unbreak My Heart	Toni Braxton	Television film
2017	Training Day	Alyse Craig	Main role: 8 episodes
2017	Tales	Angie	Episode: "You Got Me"
2018	For Love	Hope Castille	Pilot
2019–2020	The L Word: Generation Q	Quiara Thompson	Recurring role: 5 episodes
2020	All Rise	Rosa Walker	Episode: "Dancing At Los Angeles"
2021	Rebel	Cassidy	Main role: 10 episodes
2021	The Now	Kendra	4 episodes
2023	Florida Man	Iris	Main role: 7 episodes
2025	Suits LA	Erica Rollins	Main role
