= Superfly (2018 film) =

Film by Director X

- Theatrical release poster
- Directed by: Director X
- Screenplay by: Alex Tse
- Based on: Super Fly by Phillip Fenty
- Produced by: Joel Silver; Future
- Starring: Trevor Jackson; Jason Mitchell; Michael K. Williams; Lex Scott Davis; Jennifer Morrison
- Cinematography: Amir Mokri
- Edited by: Joel Negron
- Music by: Josh Atchley
- Production companies: Columbia Pictures; Silver Pictures
- Distributed by: Sony Pictures Releasing
- Release date: June 13, 2018
- Running time: 116 minutes
- Country: United States
- Language: English
- Budget: $16–29 million
- Box office: $20.8 million

Superfly (or SuperFly) is a 2018 American action crime thriller film, serving as a remake of the 1972 blaxploitation film Super Fly. Directed by Director X and written by Alex Tse, it stars Trevor Jackson as a drug lord trying to complete a final job while surviving an assortment of enemies. Jason Mitchell, Michael K. Williams, Lex Scott Davis, and Jennifer Morrison also star. Rapper Future wrote original songs for the film, and produced alongside Joel Silver.

Superfly was released in the United States on June 13, 2018, by Sony Pictures Releasing. It received mixed reviews from critics, who praised the style but ultimately found the film lacking substance. The movie was a box office disappointment, only grossing $20.8 million on a budget of $16–29 million.

== Plot ==
Youngblood Priest is a young cocaine kingpin from Atlanta, Georgia, working the streets since he was brought in by his mentor Scatter at age eleven. He lives with his two girlfriends, Georgia and Cynthia.

Juju, a member of rival gang Snow Patrol, attempts to hit on Cynthia and pulls a gun on Priest, accidentally hitting a bystander. The Snow Patrol members leave while Priest gives the victim money and directs them to the trauma center.

Priest confides in his second-in-command Eddie that he wants out of drug-dealing, and has a plan. Eddie has his back but Scatter refuses to help. Juju suspects Priest of a hit on Snow Patrol and plans to retaliate. Snow Patrol deduces that Priest's colleague, Fat Freddie, was one of the assailants. Deciding to set Priest up, Eddie contacts two corrupt police officers to start their long plan to destroy Snow Patrol.

Fat Freddie is pulled over by corrupt cops Franklin and Mason. They discover cocaine and find Eddie in Freddie's contacts. With Mason's gun at Freddie's head, his girlfriend Rochelle reveals his criminal history and Priest's identity. Franklin shoots and kills them both.

Mason threatens to expose Priest's dealing if he does not work with her. Fighting over recriminations about Freddie's death, Priest starts strangling Eddie but leaves him unconscious. Franklin and Mason show up at Fat Freddie's funeral demanding their upfront payment of $1 million.

Then Scatter surprises Priest there, ordering him to meet with his supplier Adalberto, after finding out he'd cut a secret deal for more product. Adalberto kills Scatter, having realized he had been stealing from him. He then threatens Priest, telling him that he can never get out of the game.

Snow Patrol members led by Juju shoot up Priest's mansion. During the shootout, Cynthia shoots back but is killed, and Priest and Georgia set fire to the mansion. Juju runs through the fire and out of the mansion to get in a car chase with Priest, Georgia and now Q.

Chasing Priest, Juju is injured and Q is killed in car crashes. Eddie feigns allegiance with Snow Patrol, and tricks them into an ambush where they are killed by Mason and other cops alerted by Priest.

Priest thanks Eddie for his help and prepares to leave the country with Georgia. He blackmails the mayor with a sex tape in exchange for a certain file of a convicted drug kingpin and promises he'll win in the upcoming election.

Adalberto is disowned by his mother, when she obtains the file from Priest about her son setting up his other brother into prison and executed at her order after she discloses the proof that he framed his brother for a crime. As she walks away her men dispose of Adalberto's men who was also executed. Then instead of paying off Mason, Priest tips off the police. She is arrested for cocaine possession and dismissed from the force.

Priest meets Franklin and beats him to a pulp to avenge Freddie's murder. Having settled his business obligations, and with his enemies either dead or in custody, Priest and Georgia relax on a cruise in Montenegro. When Georgia asks Priest how he feels, he replies, "Free."

== Cast ==
- Trevor Jackson as "Youngblood" Priest, an Atlanta drug lord who sees an opportunity to leave the game before he gets killed.
- Jason Mitchell as Eddie, Priest's best friend, right-hand man, and enforcer.
- Michael K. Williams as "Scatter", Priest's mentor and an experienced drug dealer. He took Priest under his wing when the latter was younger. He owns a Brazilian Jiu-Jitsu school where he is a black belt.
- Lex Scott Davis as Georgia, Priest's intellectual girlfriend. She has a strong affection and loyalty for him.
- Jennifer Morrison as Detective Mason, a corrupt cop.
- Kaalan "KR" Walker as "Juju", a member of the Snow Patrol, a rival drug outfit, who takes an immediate dislike to Priest and plots to kill him.
- Esai Morales as Adalberto Gonzalez, the leader of a Mexican drug cartel who does business with Scatter and Priest.
- Andrea Londo as Cynthia, Priest's other girlfriend. A professional stripper, she has more of a casual affection towards her lover and is in a polyamorous relationship with him and Georgia. She is fierce and street savvy.
- Big Bank Black as "Q", the pragmatic leader of Snow Patrol.
- Antwan “Big Boi” Patton as Mayor Wendell Atkins.
- Jacob Ming-Trent as Frederick "Fat Freddie" Davis, one of Priest's oldest colleagues.
- Brian F. Durkin as Officer "Turk" Franklin

== Production ==
Production began in December 2017, with Future announcing the project and confirming Director X as director. Principal photography started in Atlanta, Georgia in January 2018. Filming wrapped in March 2018, a process that Deadline Hollywood called an "unprecedented turnaround".

While Sony and other publications reported the film was made on a net production budget of $16 million, Deadline stated their sources insisted the actual cost was "well north of $20 [million], near $30 [million]". The site compared the situation to Proud Mary, a film released in January 2018 that Sony reported cost $14 million to make but other sources listed at as high as $30 million.

== Soundtrack ==
The soundtrack for the film was curated by American rapper Future, who also acted as a producer on the film. It features 13 new and previously released songs, as well as guest appearances from Miguel, Lil Wayne, Khalid, Ty Dolla Sign, Young Thug, PartyNextDoor, H.E.R., Gunna, Sleepy Brown, and Yung Bans, among others.

== Release ==
Superfly was initially scheduled to be released on June 15, 2018. Three weeks prior, it was moved up two days to June 13, 2018, in order to avoid direct competition with Incredibles 2.

The film was released on digital and iTunes on August 28, 2018, from Sony Pictures Home Entertainment. It was released on Blu-Ray and DVD on 11 September 2018.

== Reception ==
=== Box office ===
In the United States and Canada, Superfly was projected to gross $7–12 million from 2,200 theaters over its five-day opening weekend. The film made $1.2 million on its first day, $938,583 on its second and $1.8 million on its third. It ended up grossing $6.9 million in its opening weekend (a five-day total of $9 million), finishing sixth at the box office. It dropped to $3.4 million in its second weekend, finishing eighth, and after being pulled from 1,064 theaters in its third week made $1.3 million, finishing 12th.

=== Critical response ===
On review aggregator website Rotten Tomatoes, the film holds an approval rating of 51% based on 102 reviews, and an average rating of 5.3/10. The website's critical consensus reads, "Superfly updates the blaxploitation original with a stylish remake that's exciting and visually arresting enough to offer its own slickly staged action rewards, but disappointingly short on social subtext." On Metacritic, which assigns a normalized rating to reviews, the film has a weighted average score of 52 out of 100, based on 30 critics, indicating "mixed or average reviews". Audiences polled by CinemaScore gave the film an average grade of "B+" on an A+ to F scale, while PostTrak reported filmgoers gave it a 68% overall positive score.

Variety's Owen Gleiberman wrote: "Shot in a functional, slammed-together manner that's less sensually stylish than you'd expect from a music-video auteur, the film is a competent yet glossy and hermetic street-hustle drug thriller, less a new urban myth than a lavishly concocted episode. It holds your attention yet leaves you with nothing."

== See also ==
- List of black films of the 2010s
