= Nicholas James (actor) =

American actor

- Born: Nicholas James Muscarella; December 1, 1982 (age 43); Greenville, Pennsylvania, U.S.
- Education: Penn State Behrend College
- Occupations: Actor; model
- Years active: 2006–present
- Spouse: Tika Sumpter (m. 2022)
- Children: 1

Nicholas James Muscarella (born December 1, 1982), known professionally as Nicholas James and additionally variously credited as Nick James or Nicholas J. Muscarella, is an American actor. He may be best known for his recurring role, from 2016 to its 2021 finale, in the prime time soap opera The Haves and the Have Nots. He also has appeared in Prom Night (2008) and NCIS: New Orleans (2014). His earliest credited film appearance was in Eating Out 2: Sloppy Seconds in 2006.

James has appeared in television commercials for Grupo Modelo (in 2016) and Walmart (in 2014). Outside of acting, James has also worked as a model.

== Early life and education ==
James was born in Greenville, Pennsylvania, the son of Gregory and Vicki Muscarella. He has an older brother, Michael. He attended Reynolds Junior – Senior High School, and later Penn State Behrend College, where he studied management and marketing.

== Career ==
After attending Penn State Behrend College, James relocated to Hollywood, where he arrived with just $200 and worked providing bottle service at a bar while pursuing acting.

James was initially interested in comedic roles, especially sketch comedy in the style of Saturday Night Live. In Los Angeles, he studied acting under the tutelage of various renowned figures, including legendary acting coach Vincent Chase, for whom the eponymous fictional character on the TV series Entourage was named. Actor Shia LaBeouf was among his classmates. Later, he attended classes at Upright Citizen's Brigade, thus returning to his earlier interest in improvisational and sketch comedy.

James dropped his surname to form his stage name because, in his own words, "I don't look too Italian and people trip over that name all the time." His original surname Muscarella has however appeared as part of one of three variations of his name in film and television credits.

== Personal life ==
James currently resides in Los Angeles. He is vocal on political issues via Twitter, and maintains an Instagram account. His interests include the extreme sports skydiving and surfing as well as standup paddleboarding, snorkelling, hiking, animals and exotic teas.

Since at least 2016, James has been in a relationship with his Haves and the Have Nots co-star Tika Sumpter. Their daughter, Ella-Loren, was born on October 8, 2016. Despite numerous press outlets stating that James was the father, Sumpter did not confirm his paternity, then she revealed only his first name when announcing that they became engaged on Christmas Day in 2016.

== Filmography ==
note: credited as Nicholas James, except where indicated

=== Film ===
Year	Title	Role	Notes
2006	Eating Out 2: Sloppy Seconds	Surfer Guy	
2008	Prom Night	Denny Harper	as Nick James
2009	Fired Up!	Chester	
2011	Snack Off	Donny	Short film
2011	Chinese Takeout	Buck Crow	Short film, as Nick James
2012	Genre This	Joe Spudds	Short film
2017	Self Esteem	Torb Burchley	Short film
2017	Chaser	Shane	Short film

=== Television ===
Year	Title	Role	Notes
2010	The Client List		Television film
2011	NCIS	Navy Seaman Derek Balfour	TV series, "Two-Faced" (season 8, episode 20)
2011	Napoleon Bon Appétit	Tex	TV series, "Barbeque Spare Ribs" (season 2, episode 5)
2012	Jane by Design	Adam 2	TV series, "The Wedding Gown" (season 1, episode 8)
2012	Hollywood Heights	Guest Star	TV series, "The Incriminating Photo" (season 1, episode 12)
2013	The Client List	Hot wedding guest	TV series, "When I Say Do" (season 2, episode 12)
2014	Revenge	Mark Keller	TV series, "Renaissance" (season 4, episode 1)
2014	NCIS: New Orleans	Navy Lieutenant Lewis Collier	TV series, "Carrier" (season 1, episode 2)
2016–2021	The Haves and the Have Nots	Officer Justin Lewis	Series regular, sometimes credited as Nicholas J. Muscarella
