= Toni Braxton: Unbreak My Heart =

2016 film by Vondie Curtis-Hall

- Official poster
- Based on: Toni Braxton Unbreak My Heart a Memoir by Toni Braxton
- Teleplay by: Susan McMartin; Nicole Jefferson
- Directed by: Vondie Curtis-Hall
- Starring: Lex Scott Davis; Tiffany Hines; Skye P. Marshall; Cortney Scott Wright; LaToya Franklyn; Andre Hall; Gavin Houston; Greg Davis Jr. Celeste Sullivan; Debbi Morgan
- Music by: Laura Karpman
- Country of origin: United States
- Original language: English

Production
- Producers: Craig Baumgarten (exec.); Kenneth "Babyface" Edmonds; Toni Braxton (also exec.); Erik Kritzer (exec.); Marcus Grant (exec.); Towanda Braxton
- Running time: 88 minutes
- Production companies: LINK Entertainment; Lighthouse Pictures

Original release
- Network: Lifetime
- Release: January 23, 2016

Toni Braxton: Unbreak My Heart (also known as Unbreak My Heart) is a 2016 American television biographical film about R&B singer Toni Braxton. It premiered at Lifetime on January 23, 2016.

It derives its title from Braxton's book Toni Braxton Unbreak My Heart a Memoir and her most notable hit "Un-Break My Heart". The film stars Lex Scott Davis as Toni Braxton, Debbi Morgan as Evelyn Braxton, Skye P. Marshall as Towanda Braxton, Tiffany Hines as Tamar Braxton and Gavin Houston as Kenneth "Babyface" Edmonds. The film was directed by Vondie Curtis Hall and written by Susan McMartin, Toni Braxton and Nicole Jefferson.

== Plot ==
Toni Braxton is one of five daughters raised in a devoutly Methodist household by their mother, Evelyn, and reverend father, Michael. Evelyn dreams of her daughters becoming famous singers. After the sisters audition as a group for record executive L.A. Reid, only Toni is offered a recording contract. Despite initial fears of upsetting her family, Toni accepts. Evelyn makes Toni promise to help her sisters once she has found success.

At LaFace Records, Toni records with singer and producer Kenneth "Babyface" Edmonds. She releases a successful self-titled debut album in 1993. Toni hires her sisters as backup singers and dancers. After learning Toni had breast augmentation, the conservative Evelyn fears success is changing her daughter for the worse, but Toni's sisters are supportive. Toni is nominated for several Grammy awards and wins Best New Artist. She follows this up with the hit ballad "Un-Break My Heart", resulting in her biggest success yet.

During her latest tour, Toni learns that she is losing money due to the shows’ large scale and a lack of sponsors. After the tour ends, her manager informs her that she signed a bad record contract and is now $4 million in debt. Toni declares Chapter 7 bankruptcy and sues LaFace. She wins the case, but a condition of her settlement is to not publicly discuss it for a decade.

Toni and keyboardist Keri Lewis begin a romantic relationship. When she unexpectedly gets pregnant, Toni decides to have an abortion because she's been using the acne medication isotretinoin, which can cause birth defects. Eventually, Toni and Keri get married and have two healthy sons: Denim and Diezel.

For the sake of stability, Toni accepts a residency at the Flamingo Las Vegas. When Diezel is diagnosed with autism, she arranges for him to receive the best therapy available. Meanwhile, Evelyn and Michael's marriage ends when she discovers that he's had a mistress for nine years.

Toni suffers from fatigue and fainting spells, culminating in her being hospitalized for cardiac arrest. She recovers, but is diagnosed with lupus and told to reduce her workload. She keeps her diagnosis a secret and cancels her Las Vegas residency, resulting in litigation from the show's vendors. Forced to declare bankruptcy, Keri and Toni's already strained marriage ends in a divorce.

Toni reveals her lupus diagnosis to the public, hoping people will understand why she can no longer work at an intense pace. Evelyn apologizes for having placed the burden of financially supporting the whole family upon Toni's shoulders. The other Braxton sisters convince Toni to do a reality show with them called Braxton Family Values.

Feeling burnt out, Toni announces her retirement from the music industry. Babyface, not wanting her to quit, proposes they record together again. She agrees as long as the songwriting process is an equal collaboration. The resulting record wins the Grammy Award for Best R&B Album in 2015. The epilogue shows the real Toni Braxton playing the piano, singing "Un-break my Heart", while text lists her many accomplishments.

== Cast ==
- Lex Scott Davis as Toni Braxton
- Debbi Morgan as Evelyn Braxton, Toni's mother
- Tiffany Hines as Tamar Braxton, Toni's fourth younger sister
- Skye P. Marshall as Towanda Braxton, Toni's second younger sister
- Courtney Scott Wright as Traci Braxton, Toni's first younger sister
- LaToya Franklyn as Trina Braxton, Toni's third younger sister
- Andre Hall as Keri Lewis, Toni's husband
- Gavin Houston as Kenny "Babyface" Edmonds
- Greg Davis Jr. as L.A. Reid
- Celeste Sullivan as Perri "Pebbles" Reid
- Doron Bell as Scott Rhodes
- Toni Braxton as herself
- Diezel Braxton as himself

== Background and release ==
On September 15, 2015 it was announced Lifetime Network green lighted the original movie, based on Toni Braxton's memoir "Unbreak My Heart". The film was shot in Vancouver, Canada during fall 2015 confirmed by Braxton in an interview with ABC News.

"I tried to stay away from the film's set in Vancouver as much as possible. "I didn't want to make Lexi uncomfortable. I wanted her to be relaxed playing me and it was really hard for me to be objective", she explained of her absence."

— Toni Braxton, ABC News

In early December, 2015, Braxton announced the premiere date for the biopic on her Instagram account. On December 17, 2015 the trailer was released. On January 23, 2016 the biopic premiered in the United States on Lifetime TV and April 23, 2016 in the United Kingdom on Lifetime UK.

== Reception ==
=== Critical reception ===
Hollywood.com gave a mixed response towards the biopic stating "Toni Braxton's biopic was like watching whip lash – heavily censored whip lash. There were so many parts left out that watching the movie felt like a parody at times. The casting wasn’t much better but aside from these glaring issues, the movie was very well watched and anticipated."

=== Ratings ===
The film's premiere generated 3.6 million viewers, earning the highest rating for an original movie with adults ages 25–54, women 25-54 and women 18-49 since Whitney, the January 2015 biopic on Whitney Houston.

== Home media ==
Toni Braxton: Unbreak My Heart was released digitally on to Amazon on January 22, 2016 and to DVD under the title Toni Braxton: The Movie Event on June 14, 2016 available in region 1 (U.S and Canada only).
