= Renée Lawless =

American actress and singer (born 1960)

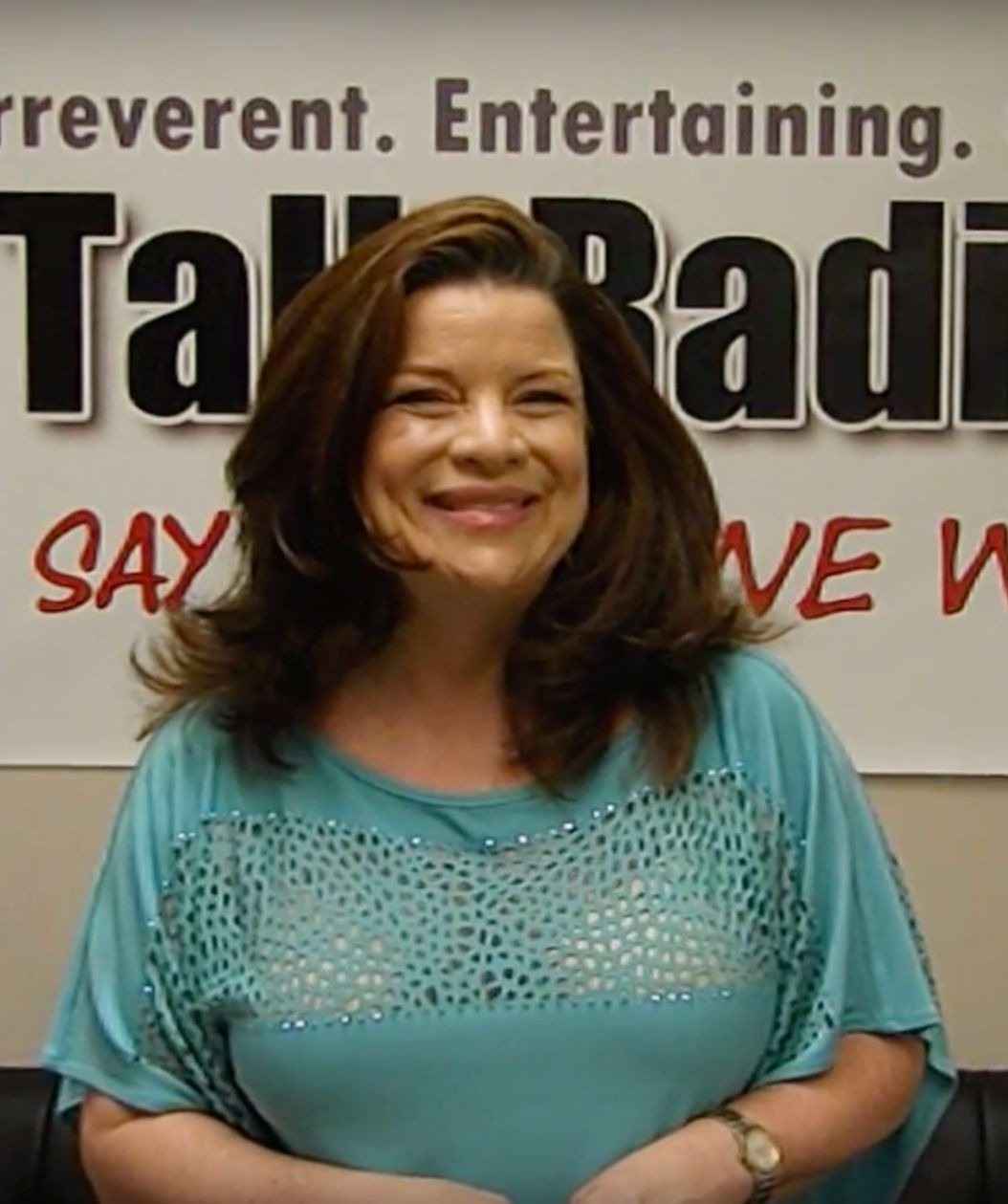
- Lawless in 2016
- Born: November 30, 1960 (age 64); Knoxville, Tennessee, US
- Occupation: Actress
- Website: Official website

Renée Lawless-Orsini (born November 30, 1960) is an American actress and singer. She is best known for starring as the bitter and distant matriarch, Katheryn Cryer, in the Oprah Winfrey Network prime time soap opera The Haves and the Have Nots.

== Life and career ==
Lawless was born in Knoxville, Tennessee, and moved with her family to Jacksonville in at age 19 and graduated from Sandalwood High School, Stetson University, and University of Cincinnati – College-Conservatory of Music. She began singing in church and school plays and later in regional theater. As of the mid 1990s she appeared primarily in stage productions, like national touring of Beauty and the Beast, and Wicked for five years.

In 2013, Lawless began starring as Katheryn Cryer in the Oprah Winfrey Network prime time soap opera The Haves and the Have Nots.

== Filmography ==
=== Film ===
Year	Title	Role	Notes
2019	They Came and Left	Geraldine Montgomery	Short

=== Television ===
Year	Title	Role	Notes
2013–2021	The Haves and the Have Nots	Katheryn Cryer	Series regular
2019	Aunt Cissy	Georgia	Recurring role
2020	Stuck With You	Agent Charlotte	Recurring role
