= The Haves and the Have Nots (TV series) =

2013 American primetime television soap opera

- Season 1 intertitle
- Genre: Soap opera; Crime thriller
- Created by: Tyler Perry
- Written by: Tyler Perry
- Directed by: Tyler Perry
- Starring: Crystal R. Fox; Reneé Lawless; Tyler Lepley; Tika Sumpter; Jaclyn Betham; Aaron O'Connell; Peter Parros; Angela Robinson; Gavin Houston; Eva Tamargo; John Schneider; Shari Headley; Allison McAtee; Danielle Deadwyler; Brett Davis; Jon Chaffin; Presilah Nunez; Nicholas James; Nick Sagar; Antoinette Robertson; Brock Yurich
- Theme music composer: Elvin Ross
- Country of origin: United States
- Original language: English
- No. of seasons: 8
- No. of episodes: 196 (list of episodes)

Production
- Executive producers: Tyler Perry; Ozzie Areu; Mark E. Swinton; Will Areu
- Camera setup: Multiple
- Running time: 42 minutes
- Production company: Tyler Perry Studios

Original release
- Network: Oprah Winfrey Network
- Release: May 28, 2013 – July 20, 2021

Related
- The Haves and the Have Nots (play)

The Haves and the Have Nots (sometimes referred to as Haves and Have Nots and abbreviated as HAHN) is an American crime drama and soap opera created, executive produced, written, and directed by Tyler Perry. The premise of the series is based on Perry's 2011 play of the same name.

The Haves and the Have Nots premiered on May 28, 2013, and ran for 8 seasons on the Oprah Winfrey Network (OWN), for a total of 196 hour-long episodes. The series finale aired on Tuesday, July 20, 2021. As part of the show's finale, a two-part cast reunion special consisting of all The Have and Have Nots main characters in front of a live studio audience was televised, part 1 on July 27 and part 2 on August 3.

The Haves and the Have Nots was ranked among the top 2 scripted cable series with a majority African American cast. The soap opera led the ratings for OWN programming throughout much of its series run. It averaged 2.8 million total viewers across its 196 episodes. During its highest rated years from 2014 to 2017, the program averaged more than 3.1 million viewers each year. It was reported in June 2021 that the program is the most-watched scripted cable series among African American women and households.

The Haves and the Have Nots was the first scripted and first fictionalized television series to air on OWN. Amid struggles to keep her network afloat before debuting The Haves and the Have Nots, Oprah Winfrey was quoted in a 2012 interview as stating, “Had I known that it was this difficult, I might have done something else.” The success of The Haves and the Have Nots, however, opened the door to many other popular scripted dramas on Winfrey's network, including Queen Sugar and Greenleaf.

== Synopsis ==
The series follows three families and their lifestyles as they struggle to coexist among one another in Savannah, Georgia: the rich, powerful, and locally very public Cryer and Harrington families (originally regarded as "The Haves") and the poor and destitute Young family (originally regarded as "The Have Nots"). The Young family is headed by Hanna, a single mother who works as the Cryer family's maid and also serves as the best friend and confidante of the lady of the house, Katheryn. Included as part of The Have Nots is another domestic worker, initially for the Cryer family and later for the local hospital, Celine Gonzales.

The Haves and the Have Nots centers on the toxicity, conflicts, corruption, hardships and dysfunctional family relations similarly experienced between the underprivileged Young family and their well-to-do counterparts, who only ostensibly live the life of Riley. Drastically and destructively flawed character traits abound from both rich and poor, perpetually creating for multidimensional chaos, tension and calamity. Circumstances on the program are regularly resolved through wild acts of violence, sabotage, rape, framing, murder, arson and other criminal acts.

While the Young family versus the Cryer and Harrington families originally lead polar opposite lifestyles in terms of social class, economics, social status, and surroundings, they are each similar in that they lead exceedingly toxic, dysfunctional lifestyles with broken family units. At the root of the turmoil are deeply wounded, complex backstories among all the characters that precede the existence of this television series. Habitual fraudulence is also at the root of the turmoil, in which mass amounts of wealth are regularly misappropriated back and forth between the show's main characters. As a result, there are repeated shifts in which characters are regarded as "the haves" and which are regarded as "the have nots," extended through the entire course of the series.

== Broadcast ==
Season	Episodes		Originally released	
Season	Episodes		First released	Last released
1	36	16	May 28, 2013	September 3, 2013
1	36	10	January 7, 2014	March 11, 2014
1	36	10	May 27, 2014	July 29, 2014
2	25	12	January 6, 2015	March 24, 2015
2	25	13	June 30, 2015	September 22, 2015
3	23	11	January 5, 2016	March 15, 2016
3	23	12	June 21, 2016	September 6, 2016
4	23	11	January 3, 2017	March 14, 2017
4	23	12	June 20, 2017	September 12, 2017
5	44	10	January 9, 2018	March 13, 2018
5	44	23	May 1, 2018	November 6, 2018
5	44	11	January 8, 2019	March 19, 2019
6	9		May 7, 2019	July 2, 2019
7	20	10	January 7, 2020	March 10, 2020
7	20	10	August 25, 2020	October 27, 2020
8	16	8	November 24, 2020	January 12, 2021
8	16	8	June 1, 2021	July 20, 2021

== Characters ==
Actor	Character	Seasons							
Actor	Character	1	2	3	4	5	6	7	8
Crystal R. Fox	Hanna Young	Main	Main	Main	Main	Main	Main	Main	Main
Reneé Lawless	Katheryn Cryer	Main	Main	Main	Main	Main	Main	Main	Main
Tyler Lepley	Benjamin "Benny" Young	Main	Main	Main	Main	Main	Main	Main	Main
Tika Sumpter	Candace Young	Main	Main	Main	Main	Main	Main	Main	Main
John Schneider	James "Jim" Cryer	Main	Main	Main	Main	Main	Main	Main	Main
Aaron O'Connell	Wyatt Cryer	Main	Main	Main	Main	Main	Main	Main	Main
Peter Parros	David Harrington	Main	Main	Main	Main	Main	Main	Main	Main
Angela Robinson	Veronica Harrington	Main	Main	Main	Main	Main	Main	Main	Main
Gavin Houston	Jeffrey Harrington	Main	Main	Main	Main	Main	Main	Main	Main
Eva Tamargo	Celine Gonzales	Main	Main					Main	Recurring
Jaclyn Betham	Amanda Cryer	Main							
Shari Headley	Jennifer Sallison	Recurring	Recurring	Main					
Allison McAtee	Margaret "Maggie" Day	Recurring	Recurring	Main					
Danielle Deadwyler	La'Quita "Quita" Maxwell		Guest	Main	Recurring			Guest	
Brett Davis	Mitchell "Mitch" Malone		Recurring	Main	Main	Main	Main	Main	Main
Jon Chaffin	Warrick "War" Lewis	Guest	Recurring	Main	Recurring				Guest
Presilah Nunez	Erica		Guest	Main	Main	Main			Guest
Nicholas James	Justin Lewis			Main	Main	Main	Main	Main	Recurring
Nick Sagar	Charles Frederickson				Main	Main	Main	Main	Recurring
Antoinette Robertson	Melissa Wilson	Recurring	Recurring	Recurring	Recurring	Main			
Brock Yurich	Bill Madison					Recurring	Recurring	Main	Main

=== The Youngs ===
- Crystal Fox as Hanna Young. Hanna is Benny and Candace's mother, and the Cryer's maid. She raised her two children as a single mother. Hanna is very deep, soulful, religious, nurturing and compassionate. Though when it comes to those who have done wrong by her, Hanna has taken to obscenities and an especially harsh, overreactive, rancorous, and even violent nature. Haggard and long-suffering, she often displays the effects of overwhelming stress, overwork, and worry in her behavior. Still, she is very much a trouper who takes to prayer, singing of gospel hymns, and recitation of Bible verses in place of complaining. Conscientious and assiduous, Hanna also displays a strong work ethic. Compounded with this, Hanna is trustworthy and reliable and can be confided in about anything; this has won her the respect of her superiors and a close bond with her boss Katheryn.
- Tika Sumpter as Candace Young. Candace is Hanna's estranged daughter, Benny's older half-sister, and one of Jim's multitude of mistresses turned ex-mistress and archenemy who's less than half his age. Candace is nowhere near as easily subjugated as the rest of Jim's ex-mistresses, such as Celine for one example. Candace is portrayed as a roguish, crafty jezebel; mischievous, flippant, saucy, presumptuous, and extremely nervy. Much to Jim's shock, it’s Candace who subjugates others—central throughout much of the program—through her many forms of manipulation; extortion; low blows; and dirt she's able to obtain on individuals.
- Tyler Lepley as Benjamin "Benny" Young. Benny is Hanna's son and Candace's half-brother. He operates a tow truck company. Benny has a tough demeanor and is overprotective. Benny is personable, dutiful, and hard-working. In comparison to his conniving sister, he is less prone to cause trouble for his mother. Still and all, Benny has proven to be particularly reckless, foolhardy and hardheaded, on numerous occasions landing himself into troubling circumstances much to his mother and sister's displeasure. He has unconditional love and care for his mother and sister, and is often caught in the middle of their acrimonious mother/daughter relationship, or lack thereof.
- Jordan Preston Carter as Quincy Delon "Q" Young Jr. (seasons 2–4, guest season 8). Candace and Quincy's mild-mannered son, Hanna's grandson and Benny's nephew.

=== The Cryers ===
- John Schneider as James "Jim" Cryer. The take-charge, self-assured, demeaning, crooked, unethical and thoughtlessly destructive patriarch of the Cryer family, and a Savannah criminal courts judge who has his eyes set on becoming Governor of Georgia. A major reason for Jim's rising to where he's at professionally and socioeconomically is because of his wife Katheryn's family. Although a kind-hearted and sensitive man at heart, Jim's urges, vices, greed, and self-preservation often get the better of him and cause him to act rashly, disloyally, destructively inconsiderately, and even abusively as far as his rank and power. Given his position as a wealthy judge in high society, Jim has certain dirty measures at his disposal from which to gain the upper hand on anyone that crosses him, to which he's never above resorting to.
- Reneé Lawless as Katheryn Cryer (née Hargrave). Katheryn is Jim's deeply warm, sensitive, caring but passive-aggressive wife. Katheryn often displays her anger, hatred, bitterness, and stress in a suppressed but still very detectable fashion. She is filled with melancholy, rancor, and sullen indignation primarily as a result of the various trials and tribulations brought upon her as it relates to her family, particularly her cheating husband to which she regularly spews vitriol.
- Aaron O'Connell as Wyatt Cryer. Wyatt is the deeply troubled, one-track-mind, drug-addicted, unfeeling and brazen son of Jim and Katheryn. In the first episode, it's learned that Wyatt is so incorrigible in his vices that he's on his third stint in rehab for drug abuse and alcoholism. Despite his parents repeated efforts to get him help and rescue him from disaster, he shows no love for either of them nor anyone else in the program but his addictions.
- Jaclyn Betham as Amanda Cryer (Season 1). Amanda was Jim and Katheryn's naïve college-aged daughter who was friends with her father's mistress, Candace. Amanda has had issues with self-harm and suicide in the past, having engaged in cutting herself. It has been hinted in the series that the reasons for Amanda's battles with self-harm may stem from some traumatic sex abuse incident from her distant past, involving Wyatt and a priest.

=== The Harringtons ===
- Peter Parros as David Harrington. David is the level-headed, grim, and gravelly-voiced husband of Veronica and father of Jeffrey, who often acts as a voice of reason. He is a judge and is also Jim's business partner and loyal friend, sometimes going along with Jim's misdeeds at the ire of others and at his own peril.
- Angela Robinson as Veronica Harrington, the wife turned ex-wife of David and mother of Jeffrey. Although appearing refined, composed, and classy, Veronica is actually an extremely no-holds-barred, vicious, cold, calculating, manipulative, and catty snob. She customarily delivered stinging barbs to receiving parties in either her trademarked cool, calm, collected manner or a plainly mocking, taunting manner. Whenever Veronica perceived herself as being crossed in the series, she orchestrated barbarically retaliatory measures through thugs and convicted felons while, in and of herself, bearing a facade of innocence, thus typically able to evade serious repercussions. During the show's original run, Veronica was advertised by OWN and various media outlets as "The Ice Queen." Very obdurate, Veronica more than proved to be set in her anti-gay and diabolic ways. It's later learned by the series end that the character was involved with a man (Jeffrey's biological father according to Veronica) who had come out of the closet during their relationship, providing backstory elements to her behaviors. Professionally, Veronica is portrayed as an insurmountable attorney with a knack for winning legal cases.
- Gavin Houston as Jeffery Harrington. Jeffery is David and Veronica's beleaguered, conflicted, ill-at-ease, dismissive and aloof son. He started out on the series as Wyatt Cryer's 24/7 substance abuse counselor in the Harrington family's drug rehabilitation program. Much to Wyatt's displeasure, Jeffery's counseling is full of preachy remarks, frequent urges for Wyatt to open up about his feelings and secret admiring. After being closeted throughout much of the first season, Jeffery spent much of the series being harassed himself by a conflicted, closeted, predatory officer named Justin. Much of the series also centers around Jeffrey regularly being persecuted by his anti-gay mother.

=== The Malones ===
- Brett Davis as Mitchell "Mitch" Malone (Seasons 3–8; recurring season 2). Mitch is a friend of Benny, recruited to work at Benny's new tow truck business. Mitch is later revealed to be related to the Malone crime family but chooses to live a straight and narrow life, though seen as the outcast within his family as a result. After suspecting War as bad news and witnessing War sexually assault Candace at the tow yard, he protects her and Benny, by throwing War in jail, putting drugs in his car to make it look as if they were his.
- Oscar Torre as Vincent "Vinny" Malone (Seasons 5–8), Mitch's dour, tough-talking, negrophobic, murderous and authoritative uncle.
- Michael Galante as Sandy Malone (Seasons 5–8), Mitch's petulant, negrophobic brother, who has difficulty living up to his uncle's cruel expectations of him. He is also a domestically abusive stalker of his biracial ex-girlfriend and later love interest of Benny.
- John Kap as Salvador "Sal" Malone (Seasons 1–2, 5, 8), Mitch's cousin
- Derek Russo as Tony Malone (Seasons 4–5, 8), Mitch's cousin
- Cameron Radice as Sammy Malone (Season 4), Mitch's first brother
- Brandon Stacy as Zeek Malone (Season 5), Mitch's youngest cousin
- Chris Caldovino as Don Malone (Season 5), Mitch's fourth oldest cousin
- Stelio Savante as Dino Malone (Season 5), Mitch and Sandy's cousin
- John Emil D'Angela as D. Malone (Season 1), Mitch's third uncle
- Alessandro Folchitto as Al Malone (Seasons 1, 4 & 8), Mitch's second uncle
- Sandy Martin (Season 1) & Rachel Winfree (Seasons 4, 7) as Rosa Malone "Mama Rose", Mitch's dark-natured, hard-boiled mob boss grandmother, who is big on favors and had a pact with Jim and David in the show's early going. This pact saw Mama Rose directing her large gang family and thug friends to carry out dirty deeds for them. This was in exchange for Jim and David previously allowing members of Mama Rose's gang family off as far as criminal charges and sentences when Jim and David were acting judges. At one point in the series, Mama Rose was of the mind that her crew owed Candace a favor for Candace's role in the death of War, thus Candace had pull with the Malones.

=== Other characters ===
- Eva Tamargo as Celine Gonzales (Main, Seasons 1–2, 7; Recurring Season 8). Celine is a former maid in the Cryer home and ex-friend of Hanna. She was originally depicted as a casual, relaxed woman, often fostering a friendly, informal atmosphere. She was also depicted as savvy, well-informed and gossipy, given to divulging useful inside information about life at the Cryers' to Hanna. However, as time passed on and Hanna appeared to become closer to Katheryn and gain favor within the Cryer household, Celine's demeanor changed: she began to take on more jealous, bullying and antagonistic behaviors, largely towards Hanna and later towards Katheryn as well. To boot, it is later learned that Celine is one of Jim's many ex-mistresses, one who slept around with Jim before being disdainfully dismissed by him, much to Celine's dismay. After several seasons of absence, Celine reappears with claims to a son of hers belonging to Jim, regularly enjoining him to assist her with child support. These efforts have all been disdainfully dismissed by Jim.
- Shari Headley as D.A. Jennifer Sallison (Season 3; recurring seasons 1–2). The district attorney who has been gunning for the Cryers and the Harringtons for some time. After a striking a deal with Wyatt for immunity for both him and Jeffery at the end of Season 3, she finally manages to arrest the Cryer and Harrington families for tampering with evidence and obstruction of justice. She also succeeds in getting Wyatt's inheritance for him, which is sure to anger his parents. In the Season 3 finale, Katheryn pulls out a gun and fatally shoots Jennifer multiple times, thus killing her. It turns out that Jennifer's body was being disposed of by the Malone family while being wrapped in plastic wrap with a note that says her name and "Cryer Victim". Her body was left at a television station by the Malone's as a way for their head boss and grandmother, Mama Rose, to pressure Jim even harder into tracking down War.
- Allison McAtee as Margaret "Maggie" Day (Season 3; recurring Seasons 1–2). A campaign manager hired by Jim's staff, who has feelings for David. She and her assistant, Landon (who is attracted to David's son Jeffrey), manage to get David released and he learns of Veronica's infidelity. In the mid-season 4 premiere, she was shot multiple times in the stomach by a gunman, being mistaken as Veronica, whom Jim intended to be killed. David witnesses her and the gunman's bodies covered in sheets at the crime scene of the shooting and mistakes her as Veronica.
- Danielle Deadwyler as LaQuita "Quita" Maxwell (Season 3; Guest in Seasons 2, 7; recurring Season 4). Quincy's ill-tempered sister who had been watching over Quincy's son before Benny rescued him. She acts as an antagonist throughout the series' run towards several characters, particularly Candace due to the mysterious absence of her brother Quincy.
- Nicholas James as Justin Lewis (Main, Seasons 3–7; Recurring, season 8). A police officer, who comes to Candace's house, minutes after Quincy had been stabbed, to check out a noise complaint from his mother, Candace's neighbor. Deeply in the closet, he makes it a habit of sexually assaulting men in the back of his squad car. After getting seduced by Jeffrey, they form a purely sexual relationship much to the disgust of Veronica.
- Antoinette Robertson as Melissa Wilson (Main, Season 5; Recurring, Seasons 1–4). A young lady who Veronica arranges to marry Jeffery. Due to her father dying of cancer and her family's inability to afford his treatment, she goes along with this knowing that her potential husband is gay. Due to Veronica's abuse and Jeffrey's obvious uninterest, she begins a brief affair with Benny Young.
- Jon Chaffin as Warrick "Warlock/War" Lewis (Season 4; Guest in Season 2, 8; recurring seasons 3, 5). A friend of Candace, who helps extort money from Jim, but learns that Candace lied about the amount.
- Presilah Nunez as Erica (Seasons 3–5; guest in season 2, 8). A woman who sold Benny her boyfriend's car after a bad break-up. It turned out that she and Candace were working together as good friends. She aided Candace in interrogating Alliyah Delong and Landon after Oscar stole Candace's money. Beginning a new mark, she becomes a love interest to David (originally as a set-up), igniting a feud between her and his wife Veronica.
- Brock Yurich as Bill Madison (Main, Seasons 7–8; Recurring, Seasons 5–6). A nurse who works at the hospital where David was severely injured. He is also Jeffery's old friend since elementary school. Madison has witnessed Jeffery get into fights with an old bully, Bobby Safeman who was also tormenting him as well. Madison is also openly gay and has feelings for Jeffery.

=== Recurring characters ===
- Patrick Faucette as Tony Watson (Seasons 1–2). Tony is Benny's estranged father whom he doesn't find out is his father until it is accidentally revealed by his mom. Through Hanna's church, Benny knew of him as "Mr. Watson" before finding out his relation to him. Hanna had a one-night-stand with Tony, which resulted in her pregnancy with Benny. In the second season, Tony tries to get Benny taken off life support, so that he could have his kidneys, not showing any sincere feelings of remorse and compassion for his son's well-being. In the third season, when Hanna reveals to Benny that Tony tried to take him off life support, Benny had Tony to come over and explain why. Tony, feeling guilty, says he didn't want his son to have to worry about not being able to walk and suffering through pain.
- Susie Abromeit as Laura (Season 1). Laura is Wyatt's longtime girlfriend, who he had not seen since rehab. When she and Wyatt reunites, Jeffery becomes jealous and tries to keep her away, and lies to Wyatt, telling him she's dating someone else, whom she hasn't seen since highschool. Once Jeffery is revealed to Wyatt by Laura, Laura calls out Jeffery for his behavior calling him a mean, cruel person.
- Medina Islam as Quincy Maxwell (Seasons 1–2; Guest in Seasons 3, 8). Quincy is one of the main antagonists of the Young family. He had once had a romantic relationship with Candace, with whom he share a child, Quincy Delon "Q" Young Jr.
- Robert Pralgo as Professor Cannon (Seasons 1; Guest in Season 2), Candace and Amanda's law professor.
- Kristian Kordula as Landon (Season 1–present), a guy who works at the campaign office and has feelings for Jeffery
- Leith Burke as Byron (Season 1), a detective
- Robert Crayton as Gansta henchman of known Drug Dealer War.
- Dasha Chadwick as Darlene (Season 1), an old friend and classmate of Benny's. She works at the county hospital where Benny was placed in by Katheryn.
- Jerome Brooks as Michael (Seasons 1–2; Guest in Season 3), Lizzie's grandfather
- Gerald Celasco as Carlos (Seasons 1–2), Jim Cryer's estranged son
- Philip Boyd as Brandon Wallace / "Oscar Aiden"' (Philip Boyd) (Seasons 2–5, Guest Season 8). Oscar is a strange guy who Candace notices spotting her at the Sarandon Hotel. He shows interest in Candace and wants to get to know her, but she continues to reject him, until he reveals his life story to her, telling her about his wife's death and how after her death, he would sleep with any woman, to keep from mourning. After this, him and Candace start to fall in love with each other.
- Maree Cheatham as Pearl (Season 3–present), Justin's mother and Candace's nosy neighbor
- Yaani King as Alliyah Delong (Seasons 2–3), a social worker for Child welfare. She helps Hanna get custody of Quincy Jr.
- Quincy Brown as Daylon (Seasons 1–3), a friend of Quita who helps her try to track down Quincy
- Fang Du as George (Season 5–present), a District attorney who takes it upon himself to investigate Jennifer Sallison's murder. His main suspects is the Cryers.
- Rome Flynn as RK (Season 5–6), a friend of Candace who works at the bar of the Artesian Hotel
- Quin Walters as Gia (Season 5), a prostitute who is struggling to make a living
- Keith Burke as Derrick (Season 5–present), a handyman who works for Katheryn and quickly develops romantic feelings for Hanna
- Geovanni Gopradi as Broderick (Season 5–present), a manager of the Artesian Hotel
- Marc Cumpton as Rocky (Season 4–present), a bartender at the Artesian Hotel
- Bree Condon as Sarah (Season 5–present), a prosecutor who works under George in the Jennifer Sallison's murder case
- Morgan Findlay as Akil (Season 7-present), one of Jim Cryer's clients
- Kwajalyn Brown as News Reporter (Seasons 1, 2 and 5), reporter who announces major news of the day

== Cast diversity ==
While composed of a majority African American cast, The Haves and the Have Nots is notably made up of a collection of racially diverse actors and actresses: one of the upper class families are Caucasian American and the other is African American; the poor family is also African American; in addition to this, there is a poor maid who is Hispanic. To that end, when Angela Robinson (the actress who plays Veronica Harrington) was interviewed about her then new role on the series in late June 2013, she stated, "This is one of the only shows on television with a diverse cast that looks like America: black, white, Latino, straight, gay, rich, and poor."

== Filming locations and setting ==
The series is set in Savannah, Georgia. The setting for The Haves and the Have Nots has been described as "firmly set in an antebellum setting that depicts what most people think about when they think of southern aristocratic culture of towns like Savannah, Georgia."

The Have and Have Nots was primarily filmed at the Tyler Perry Studios in Atlanta, Georgia. Though various scenes of the program were shot from other cities of Georgia. Among examples, one of the settings for the show was the Old Douglas County Jail, located at 6840 Church Street in Douglasville, Georgia, 30134. The Old Douglas County Jail has been the site of many television and film productions, especially since the building and property was salvaged by local officials. As another example, scenes of the show were shot at the 151 W. Main Building in Canton, Georgia.

== Reception ==
=== Awards and nominations ===
A central antagonist in the series, the "Veronica Harrington" character drew considerable attention in the media for her brand of villainy, promoted as "the ice queen with ice water running through her veins." An NBC News article characterized the character as an "insecure woman that everyone loves to hate" and "a bougie buppie, diabolical diva who slept her way to the top of Savannah's high society".

Year	Award	Category	Nominee	Result	Ref
2015	Gracie Awards	Outstanding Female Actor — One to Watch	Angela Robinson	Won	

=== Ratings ===
The Haves and the Have Nots debuted on May 28, 2013 on OWN. The Haves and the Have Nots is the first scripted television series to air on OWN. Both the show's first and second episodes aired back to back on its premiere night. The Haves and the Have Nots set a record for OWN, scoring the highest ratings ever for a series premiere on the network and held up that record for three years, with Greenleaf securing the record in June 2016.

Within its first season, Variety had recognized The Haves and the Have Nots as "OWN's most popular series to date." Also within its first season, The Haves and the Have Nots had been critically acclaimed as being "one of OWN's biggest success stories with its weekly dose of soapy fun, filled with the typical betrayals, affairs, manipulations and a bitch slap or two."

The Haves and the Have Nots episode "Why Didn't You Tell Me?" which aired on March 11, 2014, as the mid-season 2 finale had set a record for all of OWN programming, at that time the highest rated program in the station's history. The then record-breaking episode brought in 3.6 million viewers, surpassing the 3.5 million that tuned in for Oprah Winfrey's interview with Bobbi Kristina. Not only was the episode the most watched broadcast in all of OWN history at the time but it came in at number 1 among all of cable television and number 4 among all shows on television for its airing night.

In May 2015, it was reported that the third season of The Haves and the Have Nots was primetime's #1 original cable series among African-American women and total viewers, regularly attracting more than three million viewers.

== Series end ==
Taking cues from reality television programming, The Haves and the Have Nots aired a two-part cast reunion special in front of a live studio audience in the weeks following its series finale episode: the finale package began on Tuesday, July 20, 2021, with the series finale. Part I of the cast reunion aired on Tuesday, July 27, 2021, while part II aired on August 3, 2021. The move for a cast reunion addendum is novel in that cast reunion specials are, to date, uncharacteristic of scripted programming. They are a trademark of reality television that typically see turbulent exchanges among cast members in relation to the series of events from a recent season. The Have and Have Nots cast reunion special was hosted by Egypt Sherrod.

Supposedly, due to a decline in The Haves and Have Nots ratings and Perry's contract with OWN ending in 2019 (to transition to ViacomCBS's BET Network), it was determined that the series would conclude at eight seasons. Despite a decline in Nielson ratings by its final seasons, The Haves and the Have Nots still remained OWN's highest rated program with a series run that lasted longer than most television programs. Moreover, announcement of the show's ending caused a stir among the show's fanbase, lamenting over its departure.

In sharing her feelings on the soap opera's series end, Oprah Winfrey stated: "The Haves and the Have Nots was the first scripted drama we aired on OWN, and to say it took off from the first day it hit the air is an understatement. It’s all due to one man’s creativity and very vivid imagination. I thank Tyler, the incredible cast, the tireless crew, and every single viewer who watched with bated breath each week and tweeted along with us these past eight years".
