= Jaclyn Betham =

American actress and ballet dancer

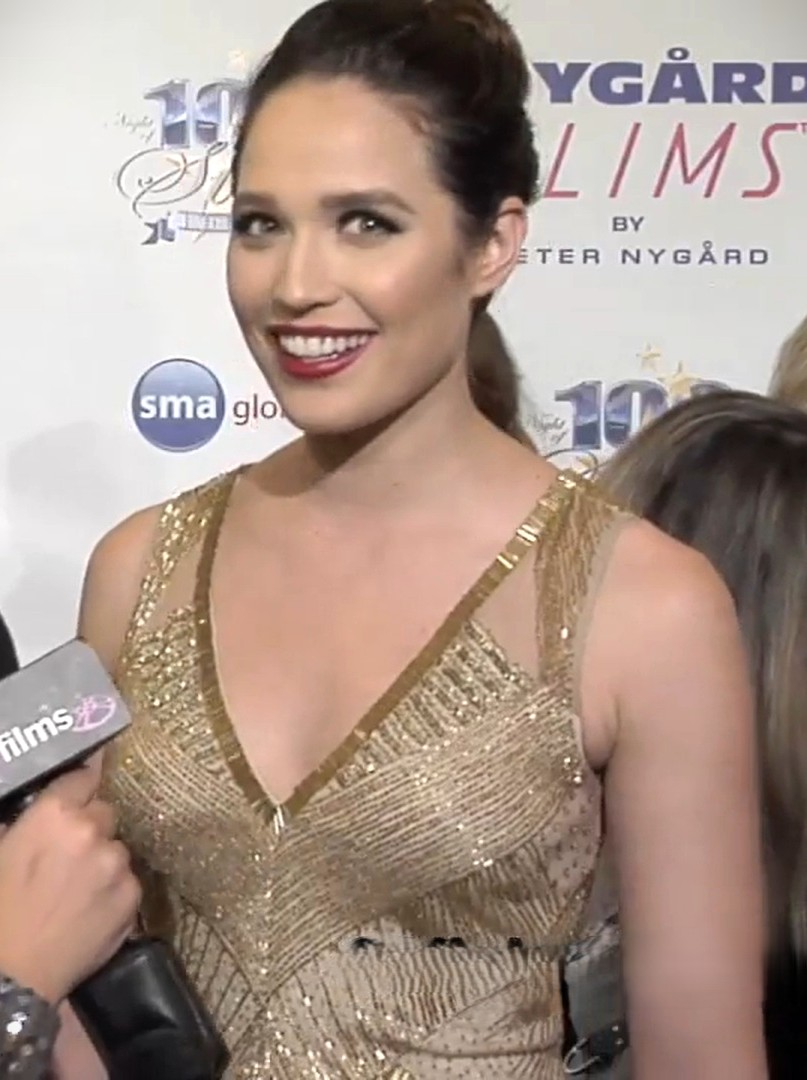
- Betham in 2014
- Born: Jaclyn Michelle Betham; July 4, 1986 (age 40); Long Beach, California, U.S.
- Occupations: Actress, ballerina
- Years active: 2010–present

Jaclyn Michelle Betham (born July 4, 1986) is an American actress and ballet dancer. She is best known for her role as Amanda Cryer on the television series The Haves and the Have Nots.

== Early life ==
Betham is of Samoan descent and was born on July 4, 1986, in Long Beach, California. She was a gymnast until the age of 12 when she started taking dance classes. At fifteen years old, she received a full scholarship to the Houston Ballet and trained with American Ballet Theatre. At eighteen years old, she won a gold medal at the Dance Grand Prix Italia for contemporary and classical ballet. Betham has performed with Ballet San Jose, Anaheim Ballet, Opera San Jose, and the San Francisco Opera.

== Career ==
Her first acting role was playing a kidnapped girl on America's Most Wanted. She starred in the popular 2012 short Quiet, a film based on the true story of a lesbian couple caught in a medical nightmare. In 2013, Betham's first major acting role came when she was cast as Amanda Cryer in the Tyler Perry television series The Haves and the Have Nots. In 2020, she made her debut as a writer and producer on the film Getaway.

== Personal life ==
Betham has worked as a ballet teacher and pilates instructor. She is the founder of a nonprofit organization called Betham Ballet Theatre.

== Filmography ==
=== Film ===
Year	Title	Role	Notes
2011	J.A.W.	Hot Volleyball Girl	Short film
2012	Quiet	Sam	Short film
2015	Touched	Maria	
2016	Ulterior Motives: Reality TV Massacre	Darcy Burns	
2020	Bring Me a Dream	Avery Quinn	
2020	Getaway	Tamara	
2021	Stars Fell on Alabama	Charlotte Lott	

=== Television ===
Year	Title	Role	Notes
2010	America's Most Wanted	Shannah	Episode: "America's Most Wanted's 1,000th Episode Special Edition"
2012	The LXD: The Legion of Extraordinary Dancers	Principal Ballerina	Episode: "Super Ballet"
2013	90210	Beach Girl	Episode: "Life's a Beach"
2013-2014	The Haves and the Have Nots	Amanda Cryer	Main role
2018	NCIS: New Orleans	Brooklyn	Episode: "Mind Games"
2018	Dear White People	Theadora	Episode: "Volume 2: Chapter X"
2019	Grand Hotel	Drea	Episode: "The Big Sickout"
2019	Dolly Parton's Heartstrings	Bijou Honeycutt	Episode: "Two Doors Down"
