= The Haves and the Have Nots (play) =

2011 play by the American playwright Tyler Perry

- Original language: English
- Written by: Tyler Perry
- Characters: Floyd, Hattie, Frank, Diane, Louis, Wallie and Rose
- Subject: Family, Wealth
- Genre: Comedy-Drama

Premiere
- Date: September 27, 2011
- Place: Detroit

The Haves and the Have Nots is an American stage play which premiered in 2011. Part comedy and part drama, it was created, produced, written, and directed by Tyler Perry. The original stage production starring Palmer Williams Jr. as Floyd, the butler and chef to a wealthy family, and Patrice Lovely as their housekeeper, Hattie, toured 46 cities.

The live performance released on DVD on July 9, 2013 was recorded live in Atlanta at the Cobb Energy Performing Arts Centre in June 2012. The DVD, which includes interviews with cast members, was released alongside Temptation: Confessions of a Marriage Counselor.

== Plot ==
The wealthy Willis family is preoccupied with superficial things until their housekeeper Hattie, whose family is struggling financially and faces eviction, asks for help. It appears her prayers have been answered when her daughter Rose and son-in-law Frank come to work at the Willis estate, but things come to a head when Mrs. Willis tries to buy Frank's affections.

== Cast ==
- Palmer Williams Jr. as Floyd
- Patrice Lovely as Hattie
- Tony Hightower as Frank
- Jeffery Lewis as Wallie
- Kislyck Halsey as Rose
- Maurice Lauchner as Lewis
- Alexis Jones as Diane
- Cassi Davis (Sub For Patrice In 2011)

== Band ==
- Ronnie Garrett – Musical Director/Bass Guitar
- Derek Scott – Guitar
- Marcus Williams – Drums
- Michael Burton – Saxophone
- Saunders Sermon – Trombone
- Natalie Ragins – Keyboards
- Melvin Jones – Trumpet
- Rashad Henderson – Background Vocals
- Greg Kirkland – Background Vocals
- Lindsey Fields – Background Vocals

== Musical numbers ==
All songs written and/or produced by Tyler Perry and Elvin D. Ross.

- "He's Able" – Rose
- "Watch Your Man" – Floyd
- "Did You Know?" – Diane
- "Falling Apart" – Hattie, Rose, Wallie and Frank
- "You Gotta Go" – Louis
- "Jesus, I Call Upon Your Name" – Hattie
- "I Thank You" – Wallie
- "I Need You" – Frank
- "Winter Will Come (Pray In The Holy Ghost)" – Entire Cast except Diane

== TV series adaptation ==
The play was very loosely adapted into The Haves and the Have Nots on Opray Winfrey's OWN television channel. Apart from featuring the lives of a wealthy family and their hired help, the series significantly differed from the play. The series featured entirely new fictional characters, situations and cast.

The television series quickly became one of OWN's most popular programs, pioneering scripted entertainment for that network. The show ran for 8 seasons from May 28, 2013 to July 20, 2021, on the Oprah Winfrey Network.
