= The Jennifer Hudson Show =

American syndicated talk show

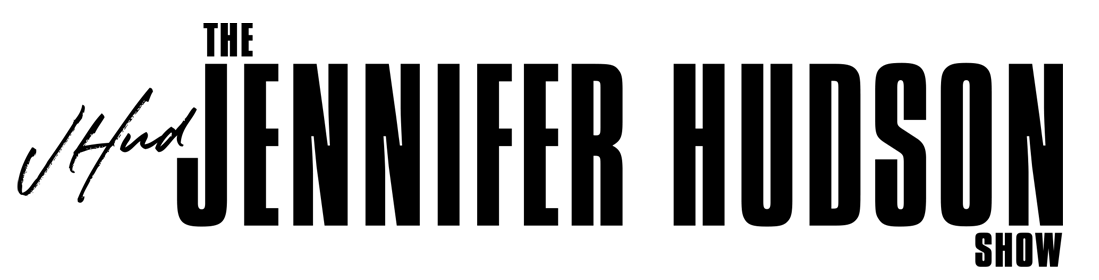
- Also known as: The J Hud Show
- Genre: Talk show
- Created by: Jennifer Hudson
- Presented by: Jennifer Hudson
- Opening theme: "Happy Place" by Jennifer Hudson
- Country of origin: United States
- Original language: English
- No. of seasons: 5
- No. of episodes: 668 (list of episodes)

Production
- Executive producers: Jennifer Hudson; Lisa Kasteler Calio; Andy Lassner; Graehme Morphy; Corey Palent; Walter Williams III
- Production location: Los Angeles, California
- Camera setup: Multi-camera
- Running time: 43 minutes
- Production companies: JHud Productions; Telepictures; Warner Bros. Television Studios

Original release
- Network: Syndication
- Release: September 12, 2022 – present

The Jennifer Hudson Show, also known as The J Hud Show, is an American syndicated daytime talk show. Hosted by singer and actress Jennifer Hudson, the series premiered on September 12, 2022.

== Production ==
In November 2021, Deadline reported that Warner Bros. Television was developing a syndicated talk show hosted by Jennifer Hudson for the 2022–23 television season. The series was being pitched as a spiritual replacement for The Ellen DeGeneres Show after its conclusion in 2022, with its executive producers Andy Lassner and Mary Connelly moving over to the new show. The series was officially announced in March 2022, with Fox Television Stations as one of its first major carriers. In June 2022, it was announced that The Jennifer Hudson Show would premiere on September 12, 2022, and that it had been cleared in 95% of the U.S. In January 2023, the series was renewed for a second season. On September 11, 2023, the series was reported to be planning to resume filming during the 2023 Writers Guild of America strike, though without writers. On September 17, one day prior to its second-season premiere, it was announced production had been paused, and the premiere postponed, due to the strike. The second season premiered on October 2, 2023, following the end of the strike. In January 2024, the show was renewed for a third season. In February 2025, the show was renewed for a fourth season. In February 2026, the show was renewed for a fifth season.

The series carries over a number of elements and personnel from The Ellen DeGeneres Show, including its executive producers Mary Connelly, Andy Lassner, and Corey Palent. It is similarly filmed at Stage 1 at Warner Bros. Studios, Burbank, with parts of the former Ellen set having been reused or modified.

=== Release ===
The Jennifer Hudson Show premiered on September 12, 2022 (which was also Hudson's 41st birthday); notable guests during its first week of shows included: Simon Cowell, Mickey Guyton, Hannah Waddingham, and Viola Davis. The premiere received a Nielsen rating of 0.7/4.

== Episodes ==
On the debut episode, Hudson welcomed, and reunited with, the first guest of the show, former American Idol judge, Simon Cowell. On the second episode, Mickey Guyton made an appearance and was the first artist to perform on the show, with her single: "Somethin' Bout You". NCT 127 was the first K-pop boyband to appear and perform on the show, with their single: 2 Baddies.

=== Season 1 (2022–2023) ===
No.	Title	Original release date	Guest(s)
1	"Episode 1"	September 12, 2022	Simon Cowell
Jennifer Hudson starts her new role as a talk show host, and chats with Simon Cowell, a former American Idol judge.
2	"Episode 2"	September 13, 2022	Magic Johnson, Mickey Guyton
Jennifer Hudson chats with Magic Johnson, a former NBA player, with Mickey Guyton, a Grammy nominated solo country singer.
3	"Episode 3"	September 14, 2022	Yvonne Orji
Jennifer Hudson chats with Yvonne Orji, an Emmy Award-nominated actress and comedian.
4	"Episode 4"	September 15, 2022	Hannah Waddingham
Jennifer Hudson chats with Hannah Waddingham about the upcoming film, Hocus Pocus 2, and her recurring role in Ted Lasso.
5	"Episode 5"	September 16, 2022	Viola Davis
Jennifer Hudson chats with Viola Davis about her new upcoming film, The Woman King.
6	"Episode 6"	September 19, 2022	Kristin Chenoweth
Jennifer Hudson chats with Kristin Chenoweth about her recent books, "My Moment" and "What Will I Do With My Love Today?".
7	"Episode 7"	September 20, 2022	Sheryl Lee Ralph
Jennifer Hudson chats with Sheryl Lee Ralph about the upcoming second season of Abbott Elementary.
8	"Episode 8"	September 21, 2022	Connie Britton
Jennifer Hudson chats with Connie Britton, from Feeding America.
9	"Episode 9"	September 22, 2022	Randy Jackson
Jennifer Hudson chats with Randy Jackson.
10	"Episode 10"	September 23, 2022	Zach Shallcross, Michaela Jaé Rodriguez
Jennifer Hudson chats with Zach Shallcross about The Bachelor, and Michaela Jaé Rodriguez in Loot.
11	"Episode 11"	September 26, 2022	Leslie Jordan, Rachel Lindsay
Jennifer Hudson chats with Leslie Jordan about the upcoming third season of Call Me Kat, and Rachel Lindsay about her show Extra.
12	"Episode 12"	September 27, 2022	Meghan Trainor
Jennifer Hudson chats with Meghan Trainor about her upcoming fifth studio album: Takin' It Back.
13	"Episode 13"	September 28, 2022	Robin Thicke, Allyson Felix
Jennifer Hudson chats with Robin Thicke about the dance competition show The Masked Singer and Allyson Felix about her footwear company "Saysh".
14	"Episode 14"	September 29, 2022	Chandra Wilson
Jennifer Hudson chats with actor Chandra Wilson, majorly known from Grey's Anatomy.
15	"Episode 15"	September 30, 2022	Derek Hough
Jennifer Hudson chats with Derek Hough about the dance competition show Dancing with the Stars.
16	"Episode 16"	October 3, 2022	Howie Mandel
Jennifer Hudson chats with Howie Mandel about the talent show, America's Got Talent.
17	"Episode 17"	October 4, 2022	LL Cool J, Michael R. Jackson
Jennifer Hudson chats with actor LL Cool J from NCIS: Los Angeles, and with playwright Michael R. Jackson about his Broadway play A Strange Loop.
18	"Episode 18"	October 5, 2022	Jimmie Allen, Bobby Berk
Jennifer Hudson chats with Jimmie Allen about his new album Tulip Drive and his upcoming tour with Carrie Underwood; Jennifer Hudson chats with Bobby Berk about the 2018 reboot show Queer Eye.
19	"Episode 19"	October 6, 2022	Hasan Minhaj, Kim Carter
Jennifer Hudson chats with Hasan Minhaj about his show on Netflix, Hasan Minhaj: The King's Jester, and Kim Carter about her book, Welcome To My Purpose.
20	"Episode 20"	October 7, 2022	Kunal Nayyar, Harry Shum Jr.
Jennifer Hudson chats with Kunal Nayyar about the upcoming movie The Storied Life of A.J. Fikry and Harry Shum Jr. from the TV show Grey's Anatomy and podcast series Echo Park.
21	"Episode 21"	October 10, 2022	Joel McHale, Shangela, Gleb Savchenko
Jennifer Hudson chats with Joel McHale from the television show Stargirl; Jennifer Hudson chats with Shangela and Gleb Savchenko about the dance competition show Dancing with the Stars.
22	"Episode 22"	October 11, 2022	Kevin McKidd, Dale Spratt, Juwan Mass, Marcus Harvey, NCT 127
Jennifer Hudson chats with Kevin McKidd about the show Grey's Anatomy; Jennifer Hudson chats with Dale Spratt, Juwan Mass, and Marcus Harvey about their show Ghostbusters: Haunted Houseguests, and K-pop boy band NCT 127 performs and chats.
23	"Episode 23"	October 12, 2022	Taye Diggs
Jennifer Hudson chats with Taye Diggs about the fifth season premiere of All American.
24	"Episode 24"	October 13, 2022	Laverne Cox, Jacob Collier
Jennifer Hudson chats with Laverne Cox about her show If We're Being Honest with Laverne Cox and Jacob Collier chats and performs.
25	"Episode 25"	October 14, 2022	Vanessa Lachey, Nick Lachey
Jennifer Hudson chats Vanessa Lachey starring in television show NCIS: Hawaiʻi, and with Nick Lachey about reality dating show: Love Is Blind.
26	"Episode 26"	October 17, 2022	Kelly Rowland
Jennifer Hudson chats with Kelly Rowland about the upcoming horror-comedy movie The Curse of Bridge Hollow.
27	"Episode 27"	October 18, 2022	Max Greenfield, Rosanna Pansino, Taylor Harris
Jennifer Hudson chats with Max Greenfield about the show The Neighborhood and his children's book "This Book is Not a Present". Jennifer Hudson chats with Rosanna Pansino about the upcoming show Halloween Cookie Challenge where she co-hosts; Taylor Harris chats and performs.
28	"Episode 28"	October 19, 2022	Adam Lambert, Jalyn Hall, Brianna Cameron
Jennifer Hudson chats with Adam Lambert about his Las Vegas concert series: The Witch Hunt; Jalyn Hall about the upcoming biographical drama film: Till. Brianna Cameron chats and performs.
29	"Episode 29"	October 20, 2022	Daymond John, Cheyenne Jackson
Jennifer Hudson chats with Daymond John about "Black Entrepreneurs Day" and his book "Little Daymond Learns to Earn". Jennifer Hudson chats with Cheyenne Jackson about the television show Call Me Kat.
30	"Episode 30"	October 21, 2022	Jenna Dewan, Babyface
Jennifer Hudson chats with Jenna Dewan about drama show The Rookie, and with Babyface about his new album Girls Night Out.
31	"Episode 31"	October 24, 2022	Chance the Rapper, John Eze Uzodinma
Jennifer Hudson chats with Chance the Rapper about his second studio album, Star Line Gallery, and the Black Star Line music festival. Violinist John Eze Uzodinma chats and performs.
32	"Episode 32"	October 25, 2022	Cedric the Entertainer, Charli D'Amelio, Dixie D'Amelio
Jennifer Hudson chats with Cedric the Entertainer about the show The Neighborhood. Charli D'Amelio and Dixie D'Amelio chat about their reality show The D'Amelio Show.
33	"Episode 33"	October 26, 2022	Marlon Wayans
Jennifer Hudson chats with Marlon Wayans about the Netflix television film The Curse of Bridge Hollow .
34	"Episode 34"	October 27, 2022	Eddie Redmayne
Jennifer Hudson chats with Eddie Redmayne about starring in Netflix's original movie The Good Nurse. The duo, Marcus and Michael Griffin chat and perform.
35	"Episode 35"	October 28, 2022	Drew Scott, Jonathan Scott, Amber Ruffin
Jennifer Hudson chats with the Property Brothers about their upcoming show Property Brothers: Forever Home, and with Amber Ruffin where she talks about her late-night talk show The Amber Ruffin Show.
36	"Episode 36"	October 31, 2022	Terry Crews, Suzu
Jennifer Hudson chats with Terry Crews about his upcoming book Terry's Crew. Jennifer Hudson also chats with Suzu about the show Drink Masters while having a Halloween-themed drink demo.
37	"Episode 37"	November 1, 2022	Nicole Scherzinger
Jennifer Hudson chats with Nicole Scherzinger about judging on the eighth season of The Masked Singer.
38	"Episode 38"	November 2, 2022	Fortune Feimster, Tasha Cobbs Leonard
Comedian Fortune Feimstertalks about her Netflix stand-up special "Good Fortune." Grammy Award-winning gospel singer Tasha Cobbs Leonard collabs with Jennifer Hudson
39	"Episode 39"	November 3, 2022	Alfonso Ribeiro
"Dancing with the Stars" and "AFV" host Alfonso Ribeiro joins Jennifer on the couch.
40	"Episode 40"	November 4, 2022	Chaka Khan
The legendary multi-Grammy Award-winner Chaka Khan stops by to chat with Jennifer and perform her latest single.
41	"Episode 41"	November 7, 2022	Beth Behrs, Aldis Hodge
The star of CBS series "The Neighborhood", Beth Behrs joins Jennifer in the studio. The "Black Adam" actor, Aldis Hodge, sits down on the couch with Jennifer Hudson.
42	"Episode 42"	November 8, 2022	Shania Twain, Jodie Turner-Smith
Country music superstar Shania Twain performs. Jodie Turner-Smith talks to Jennifer about her new political thriller film, "The Independent."
43	"Episode 43"	November 9, 2022	Jerry O'Connell, Dr. Corey Yeager
"Pictionary" host Jerry O'Connell brings the game to "The Jennifer Hudson Show" studio! Actor Boris Kodjoe promotes the ABC drama "Station 19."
44	"Episode 44"	November 10, 2022	Tamera Mowry-Housley, Gabby Samone
Tamera Mowry-Housley chats about her book "You Should Sit Down for This," and gets "The Jennifer Hudson Show" audience excited for her Hallmark Channel movie "Inventing the Christmas Prince" out November 18.
45	"Episode 45"	November 11, 2022	Josh Groban
Josh Groban chats with Jennifer about his "Beauty and the Beast" special, airing December 15 on ABC.
46	"Episode 46"	November 14, 2022	Jonathan Majors
Jonathan Majors chats with Jennifer about his new film "Devotion" and getting into shape for THAT Men's Health cover.
47	"Episode 47"	November 15, 2022	Kerry Washington, Emayatzy Corinealdi, David Archuleta
Kerry Washington is joined by Emayatzy Corinealdi to talk about Hulu's "Reasonable Doubt" which Kerry is executive producing. Singer and "American Idol" alum David Archuleta promotes his latest single "Faith In Me" and his upcoming Christmas Tour.
48	"Episode 48"	November 16, 2022	Tichina Arnold, Jaren Lewison
After her "The Neighborhood" co-stars Beth Behrs, Cedric the Entertainer and Max Greenfield stopped by, Tichina Arnold joins Jennifer Hudson on the couch. Jaren Lewison chats with Jennifer about "Never Have I Ever."
49	"Episode 49"	November 17, 2022	Justin Hartley, Stephen 'tWitch' Boss, Allison Holker Boss
Justin Hartley stops by to talk about his new movie "The Noel Diary.". Former Ellen announcer Stephen 'tWitch' Boss and Allison Holker Boss promote the Disney+ special "The Hip Hop Nutcracker."
50	"Episode 50"	November 18, 2022	Sam Smith, Morris Day
Sam Smith promotes his latest single "Unholy." After receiving the Legend Award at this year's Soul Train Awards, May Morris chats to Jennifer in the studio.
51	"Episode 51"	November 21, 2022	David Arquette, Robin de Jesus
David Arquette talks about being a "Kindness Captain," as in his partnership with On Our Sleeves. Robin de Jesus sits down on the couch to talk about his Hulu series "Welcome to Chippendales."
52	"Episode 52"	November 22, 2022	Tabitha Brown
Tabitha Brown does a cooking demo with Jennifer Hudson.
53	"Episode 53"	November 23, 2022	Toni Braxton, Anika Noni Rose
Toni Braxton speaks to Jennifer about executive producing Lifetime movie "A Christmas Spark," and her skin care line "Nude Sugar." Jennifer Hudson's "Dreamgirls" co-star Anika Noni Rose stops by to talk about "Let the Right One In" on Showtime.
54	"Episode 54"	November 28, 2022	Tony Hale
Tony Hale chats to Jennifer about the second season of the Disney+ series "The Mysterious Benedict Society."
55	"Episode 55"	November 29, 2022	Jameela Jamil, Josh Dallas
Jameela Jamil chats with Jennifer Hudson about the Peacock series "Pitch Perfect: Bumper in Berlin" and her company I Weigh. The "Manifest" star, Josh Dallas joins Jennifer Hudson on the couch.
56	"Episode 56"	November 30, 2022	Glen Powell, Aurielle Marie
Following an appearance from co-star Jonathan Majors, Glen Powell stops by to talk about his new movie "Devotion." Jennifer Hudson also chats with Aurielle Marie about The Budgetnista.
57	"Episode 57"	December 1, 2022	Ken Jeong, Ashton Sanders
After fellow panelists Robin Thicke and Nicole Scherzinger graced the couch, comedy actor Ken Jeong chats to Jennifer Hudson about his role as a judge on Fox's "The Masked Singer." Ashton Sanders promotes the Whitney Houston biopic "I Wanna Dance with Somebody," in which he plays Bobby Brown.
58	"Episode 58"	December 2, 2022	None
Jennifer Hudson looks back at a few of her favorite memories on the show with music's biggest stars.
59	"Episode 59"	December 5, 2022	Billy Porter, Haley Lu Richardson
Billy Porter chats about "Accused" and new memoir, "Unprotected." Haley Lu Richardson joins Jennifer Hudson on the couch to talk all things "The White Lotus."
60	"Episode 60"	December 6, 2022	Amber Riley
Amber Riley stops by to talk about "The Black Beauty Effect."
61	"Episode 61"	December 7, 2022	Don Cheadle, Adrienne Bailon-Houghton
Don Cheadle chats with Jennifer Hudson about his new movie "White Noise." Adrienne Bailon-Houghton helps Jennifer kick off the most wonderful time of the year with Day 1 of Mama Hud's Holiday Giveaways.
62	"Episode 62"	December 8, 2022	Ciara, Howie Mandel
Jennifer Hudson welcomes her friend Ciara as she prepares to host "New Year's Rockin' Eve." Howie Mandel helps Jennifer spread holiday cheer with Day 2 of Mama Hud's Holiday Giveaways.
63	"Episode 63"	December 9, 2022	Lindsey Vonn
Former US Ski Team racer Lindsey Vonn promotes her book, "Rise: My Story" and The Lindsey Vonn Foundation.
64	"Episode 64"	December 12, 2022	Blake Shelton, James Corden
Blake Shelton visits "The Jennifer Hudson Show" to talk about "The Voice" and his new show "Barmageddon." Jennifer Hudson also chats with James Corden about his show Mammals.
65	"Episode 65"	December 13, 2022	Regina Hall, Russell Dickerson
Actress Regina Hall sits on the couch to chat about "The Best Man: The Final Chapters." Russell Dickerson stops by to chat about his new album.
66	"Episode 66"	December 14, 2022	Sam Worthington, Kendrick Sampson, Sheléa
"Avatar: The Way of Water" actor Sam Worthington joins Jennifer on the couch. Kendrick Sampson promotes "Something from Tiffany's." Sheléa performs her latest holiday song, "Mothers And Shepherds."
67	"Episode 67"	December 15, 2022	Matthew Perry, Greta Onieogou
Matthew Perry discusses his memoir, "Friends, Lovers, and the Big Terrible Thing." Jennifer Hudson also chats with Greta Onieogou about her show All American.
68	"Episode 68"	December 16, 2022	Gabrielle Union, Michael McIntyre, PJ Morton
Gabrielle Union promotes her film, "The Inspection." Comedian Michael McIntyre promotes "The Wheel." Grammy Award-winning artist PJ Morton promotes his album "Watch the Sun" and performs.
69	"Episode 69"	January 2, 2023	Brian Tyree Henry
Brian Tyree Henry promotes his Apple TV+ film "Causeway."
70	"Episode 70"	January 3, 2023	Mario Lopez, Todrick Hall
"Access Hollywood" host Mario Lopez chats with Jennifer about "On with Mario Lopez" and the new season of "Too Hot to Handle." Todrick Hall tells Jennifer about his new HGTV show, "Battle of the Bling," and his new album, "Jim."
71	"Episode 71"	January 4, 2023	Wendi McLendon-Covey, Kirby Howell-Baptiste
Wendi McLendon-Covey joins Jennifer on the couch to talk about "The Goldbergs." Kirby Howell-Baptiste chats about her children's books "Little Black Boy" and "Little Black Girl."
72	"Episode 72"	January 5, 2023	Morris Chestnut, Antonia Gentry
Morris Chestnut promotes Peacock's "The Best Man: The Final Chapters." Antonia Gentry stops by to chat "Ginny & Georgia."
73	"Episode 73"	January 6, 2023	Kumail Nanjiani
Jennifer welcomes Kumail Nanjiani to the studio as the actor promotes the Hulu series "Welcome to Chippendales."
74	"Episode 74"	January 10, 2023	Adam DiMarco, Ashlee Simpson Ross
"The White Lotus" star Adam DiMarco stops by to chat with Jennifer. Ashlee Simpson Ross joins Jennifer on the couch to talk about her home line, Kempa Home.
75	"Episode 75"	January 11, 2023	Taylor Tomlinson
Comedian Taylor Tomlinson promotes her Netflix special "Look at You."
76	"Episode 76"	January 12, 2023	Justin Baldoni, Angie Thomas, Dhonielle Clayton
Justin Baldoni promotes his book "Boys Will Be Human." Angie Thomas and Dhonielle Clayton, two of the authors of the book "Whiteout," stop by the studio.
77	"Episode 77"	January 13, 2023	Gabriel Iglesias
Gabriel Iglesias talks about his Netflix stand-up special "Stadium Fluffy" and his upcoming tour dates.
78	"Episode 78"	January 16, 2023	Jay Pharaoh, Kyla Pratt
Jay Pharoah shares his hilarious impressions with the "Jennifer Hudson Show" audience. "Call Me Kat" star Kyla Pratt joins Jennifer on the couch.
79	"Episode 79"	January 17, 2023	Michael Chiklis, Rosanna Scotto, Elaina Scotto
Award-winning actor Michael Chiklis stops by to chat about FOX's "Accused." "Good Day New York" anchor Rosanna Scotto and her sister Elaina show Jennifer how to cook recipes from their book "Meatballs, Mangia & Memories."
80	"Episode 80"	January 18, 2023	Debbie Allen
Legendary actress Debbie Allen chats about the Debbie Allen Middle School
81	"Episode 81"	January 19, 2023	Greg Mathis, Chase Rice
The longest-running Black male TV host, Judge Mathis, visits the studio. Chase Rice performs his latest song, "Way Down Yonder."
82	"Episode 82"	January 20, 2023	Octavia Spencer
Academy Award winner Octavia Spencer promotes the drama series "Truth Be Told."
83	"Episode 83"	January 23, 2023	Winnie Harlow
Model Winnie Harlow talks about her sun care line, Cay Skin. Actor Marcus Scribner joins Jennifer on the couch.
84	"Episode 84"	January 24, 2023	None
Jennifer Hudson reminisces her funniest moments on the show.
85	"Episode 85"	January 25, 2023	Shemar Moore, Reneé Rapp
"S.W.A.T." star Shemar Moore joins Jennifer on the couch. Reneé Rapp promotes her debut EP, "Everything To Everyone."
86	"Episode 86"	January 26, 2023	Katharine McPhee
Katharine McPhee Foster chats to Jennifer about her "An Intimate Evening with David Foster & Katharine McPhee" Tour and her jewelry line, KMF Jewelry. Two-time Grammy nominated artist Samara Joyperforms.
87	"Episode 87"	January 30, 2023	Gabrielle Union, Sam Jay
Actress Gabrielle Union talks about her film "The Inspection," which is in theaters now. Comedian Sam Jay promotes the Netflix film "You People."
88	"Episode 88"	January 31, 2023	Tia Mowry, Ledisi
Tia Mowry tells Jennifer about her new haircare line, 4U by Tia. Ledisi performs her upcoming song "I Need to Know."
89	"Episode 89"	February 1, 2023	Drew Carey, Storm Reid
Drew Carey promotes upcoming special episodes of "The Price Is Right" celebrating his 15th anniversary as host. Actress Storm Reid drops by to chat about her new movie "Missing."
90	"Episode 90"	February 2, 2023	Heidi Klum, Jacob Latimore
Supermodel and NBC's "AGT: All Stars" host Heidi Klum joins Jennifer on the couch. Jacob Latimore promotes his new movie "House Party."
91	"Episode 91"	February 3, 2023	Rita Moreno
Fellow EGOT Rita Moreno chats about her new film "80 for Brady."
92	"Episode 92"	February 6, 2023	Meagan Good
"Harlem" actress Meagan Good joins Jennifer on the couch.
93	"Episode 93"	February 7, 2023	Yvette Nicole Brown, Ron Funches
Yvette Nicole Brown drops by to chat about "Act Your Age." Ron Funches tells Jennifer about his new film "80 for Brady."
94	"Episode 94"	February 8, 2023	Patti LaBelle
Singing legend Patti LaBelle joins Jennifer Hudson in the studio to talk about her tour.
95	"Episode 95"	February 9, 2023	John Legend
John Legend celebrates the 100th episode of "The Jennifer Hudson Show." John performs "Nervous" off his album "Legend" and talks about his Loved01 skincare line.
96	"Episode 96"	February 10, 2023	Alison Brie, Katherine Schwarzenegger Pratt
Alison Brie chats about her new movie "Somebody I Used to Know." Katherine Schwarzenegger Pratt tells Jennifer about her children's book "Good Night, Sister.'
97	"Episode 97"	February 13, 2023	Andie MacDowell, Tinashe
Legendary actress Andie MacDowell promotes "The Way Home." Singer Tinashe joins Jennifer Hudson on the couch to talk about her album "333."
98	"Episode 98"	February 14, 2023	Tyrese Gibson, Muni Long
Tyrese Gibson stops by to chat about "Fast X" and his album "Beautiful Pain." Jennifer Hudson meets Muni Long as she promotes "Public Displays of Affection: The Album."
99	"Episode 99"	February 15, 2023	Kiersey Clemons
Kiersey Clemons talks about her new movie "Somebody I Used To Know."
100	"Episode 100"	February 16, 2023	Jackée Harry, Javicia Leslie
Legendary actress Jackée Harry promotes "Days of Our Lives." "The Flash" actress Javicia Leslie joins Jennifer in the studio.
101	"Episode 101"	February 17, 2023	Jay Ellis, Zach Stafford, Sam Sanders
Jay Ellis talks about his new movie "Somebody I Used to Know." Jennifer Hudson also chats with Zach Stafford and Sam Sanders about their podcast "Vibe Check".
102	"Episode 102"	February 20, 2023	Chelsea Handler, Nico Parker
Chelsea Handler drops by to talk about her Netflix special "Revolution." Nico Parker chats about her new series "The Last of Us."
103	"Episode 103"	February 21, 2023	Kareem Abdul-Jabbar, Melissa Rauch, Rotimi
NBA legend Kareem Abdul-Jabbar joins Jennifer in the studio! Melissa Rauch chats about her show "Night Court." Rotimi performs a medley of his songs "Love Somebody" and "Make You Say."
104	"Episode 104"	February 22, 2023	Janelle James, Sandy Yawn
"Abbott Elementary" actress Janelle James brings the laughs! "Below Deck" star Captain Sandy Yawn promotes her book, "Be the Calm or Be the Storm: Leadership Lessons from a Women at the Helm."
105	"Episode 105"	February 23, 2023	Rita Wilson, "Young Dylan" Gilmer, Monique Kelly
Rita Wilson joins Jennifer on the couch as she promotes "A Man Called Otto." "Young Dylan" Gilmer promotes "Tyler Perry's Young Dylan." Dating expert Monique Kelley shares her tips!
106	"Episode 106"	February 24, 2023	Larry Wilmore
Larry Wilmore promotes The Podcast Academy's Awards for Excellence in Audio. Grammy-nominated musician Adam Blackstone chats with Jennifer about his recent album "Legacy" after playing with Rihanna at the Super Bowl Halftime
107	"Episode 107"	February 27, 2023	Joel McHale, David Riherd
Joel McHale talks about his new show, "Animal Control." The actor then joins Wildlife Learning Center (WLC) co-founder David Riherd, who teaches Jennifer and Joel about different animals. WLC is a zoological park in Sylmar, California, that cares for more than 100 displaced, rescued, and zoo-born wild animals.
108	"Episode 108"	February 28, 2023	DJ Khaled, Diego Boneta
DJ Khaled talks to Jennifer about his new album, "God Did." Diego Boneta promotes "At Midnight."
109	"Episode 109"	March 1, 2023	Jo Koy, Ashley McBryde
Comedian Jo Koy promotes his world tour. Grammy Award winner Ashley McBryde promotes her album "Ashley McBryde Presents: Lindeville."
110	"Episode 110"	March 2, 2023	Ernie Hudson, Madison Bailey
Legendary actor Ernie Hudson promotes "Quantum Leap." Madison Bailey drops by to talk about "Outer Banks."
111	"Episode 111"	March 3, 2023	Paula Abdul, Jillian Michaels
Jennifer Hudson welcomes former "American Idol" judge Paula Abdul to the studio! Jillian Michaels chats about The Fitness App and her podcast, "Keeping It Real."
112	"Episode 112"	March 6, 2023	Adam Pally
"The Mindy Project" alum Adam Pally stops by to chat about his film "Who Invited Charlie?"
113	"Episode 113"	March 7, 2023	Boris Kodjoe
Jennifer Hudson chats with Boris Kodjoe about his show Station 19.
114	"Episode 114"	March 13, 2023	Jay Shetty, Michael Urie, Dean Lewis
Jay Shetty talks about his tour and his book, "8 Rules of Love: How to Find It, Keep It, and Let It Go." Michael Urie promotes "Shrinking." Dean Lewis performs his latest single, "How Do I Say Goodbye?"
115	"Episode 115"	March 14, 2023	Sebastian Maniscalco, Mason Gooding
Sebastian Maniscalco talks about his Netflix special, "Sebastian Maniscalco: Is It Me?" and his podcast, "Daddy vs. Doctor." Mason Gooding promotes "Scream VI."
116	"Episode 116"	March 15, 2023	Chrissy Metz, Harold Green III
Chrissy Metz promotes her children's book, "When I Talk to God, I Talk About You." Nika King promotes "65."
117	"Episode 117"	March 16, 2023	Katie Lowes, Guillermo Díaz, PJ Morton
Katie Lowes and Guillermo Díaz talk about their podcast, "Unpacking the Toolbox: A Scandal Rewatch." PJ Morton chats to Jennifer and performs his song "Good Morning."
118	"Episode 118"	March 17, 2023	Quinta Brunson, Stephanie Mills
"Abbott Elementary" star Quinta Brunson stops by. Stephanie Mills promotes "Black Broadway: A Proud History, a Limitless Future."
119	"Episode 119"	March 20, 2023	Mike Epps, Sarah Shahi
Mike Epps stops by to talk about "The Upshaws." Sarah Shahi chats about the new season of "Sex/Life."
120	"Episode 120"	March 21, 2023	Charles Barkley
Charles Barkley promotes "Inside the NBA."
121	"Episode 121"	March 22, 2023	Coco Jones, Skai Jackson
Coco Jones performs and chats about Peacock's "Bel-Air," and performs her hit song "ICU" off her album, "What I Didn't Tell You." Former Jessie and Bunk'd star Skai Jackson promotes her fragrance, "Bloom Up!"
122	"Episode 122"	March 23, 2023	Melanie Lynskey, Brooklyn Peltz Beckham
Melanie Lynskey drops by to talk about "Yellowjackets." Brooklyn Peltz Beckham promotes the Silk Nextmilk campaign.
123	"Episode 123"	March 24, 2023	Tamar Braxton, The Isley Brothers
Tamar Braxton joins Jennifer on the couch to discuss "Queens Court." The Isley Brothers are in the studio to talk about their album "Make Me Say It Again, Girl."
124	"Episode 124"	March 27, 2023	Jesse Palmer, Tati Gabrielle, MAJOR
Jesse Palmer talks about "The Bachelor." Tati Gabrielle chats about the latest season of "You." Grammy nominated R&B artist MAJOR. sits down for a chat andperforms his latest song, "Baby Will You Love Me."
125	"Episode 125"	March 28, 2023	Dermot Mulroney, Jessica Williams, Hannah Fry
Dermot Mulroney stops by to talk about "Scream VI." Jessica Williams chats about the series "Shrinking." Mathematician, professor, and television personality Hannah Fry promotes the Bloomberg Media series "The Future with Hannah Fry."
126	"Episode 126"	March 29, 2023	Reba McEntire
Reba McEntire promotes the Reba: Live in Concert Tour.
127	"Episode 127"	March 30, 2023	Julie Bowen, Method Man, Larenz Tate
Julie Bowen joins Jennifer in the studio as she promotes "Prom Pact." Method Man and Larenz Tate talk about "Power Book II: Ghost."
128	"Episode 128"	March 31, 2023	Ashley Park, Jabari Banks
Ashley Park promotes "BEEF." Jabari Banks joins Jennifer on the couch to discuss "Bel-Air.
129	"Episode 129"	April 3, 2023	Kevin Nealon, Xscape
Kevin Nealon chats about his book, "I Exaggerate: My Brushes with Fame." Xscape are in the studio to promote "SWV & Xscape: The Queens of R&B."
130	"Episode 130"	April 4, 2023	Mayim Bialik, Julian Grant, SWV
Jeopardy! host Mayim Bialik and Julian Gant drop by to talk about "Call Me Kat." SWV perform their song "Right Here (Human Nature Remix)."
131	"Episode 131"	April 5, 2023	Roy Wood Jr., Cierra Ramirez
Roy Wood Jr. stops by to chat about the White House Correspondents' Dinner. Jennifer Hudson also chats with Cierra Ramirez about her show Good Trouble.
132	"Episode 132"	April 6, 2023	Khloé Kardashian, The War and Treaty
Khloé Kardashian promotes her fashion brand Good American. The War and Treaty perform their song "Have You a Heart" from their upcoming album, "Lover's Game."
133	"Episode 133"	April 7, 2023	The Walls Group
The Walls Group perform their song "I Need You" from their recent album, "Four Walls."
134	"Episode 134"	April 10, 2023	Tan France
Tan France joins Jennifer on the couch to chat about his Netflix reality competition show, "Next In Fashion."
135	"Episode 135"	April 11, 2023	Rob Riggle, Sam Claflin
Rob Riggle promotes his documentary, "Plastic Earth." Sam Claflin stops by to discuss "Daisy Jones & the Six."
136	"Episode 136"	April 12, 2023	Tisha Campbell
Tisha Campbell drops by to talk about her film, "Every Breath She Takes."
137	"Episode 137"	April 13, 2023	Nikki Bella, Brie Bella, D.B. Woodside
Nikki & Brie Bella chat about "The Bellas Podcast" and their wine label Bonita Bonita. D.B. Woodside promotes his television show, "The Night Agent."
138	"Episode 138"	April 14, 2023	Stephen A. Smith
Stephen A. Smith discusses his memoir, "Straight Shooter," and podcast, "Know Mercy."
139	"Episode 139"	April 17, 2023	None
Jennifer Hudson reminisces about her conversations with women throughout the show's first season
140	"Episode 140"	April 18, 2023	Giancarlo Esposito, Ben Napier, Erin Napier
Giancarlo Esposito joins Jennifer on the couch to chat about "The Mandalorian." Ben & Erin Napier stop by to discuss their television show, "Home Town Takeover."
141	"Episode 141"	April 19, 2023	Tyler James Williams, Kristin Cavallari
Tyler James Williams drops by to talk about "Abbott Elementary." Kristin Cavallari promotes her cookbook, "Truly Simple."
142	"Episode 142"	April 20, 2023	Kamala Harris
Vice President Kamala Harris sits down for an exclusive daytime talk show interview on "The Jennifer Hudson Show."
143	"Episode 143"	April 21, 2023	Chris Hardwick, Ben Harper
Chris Hardwick chats about his game show, "The Wall." Ben Harper discusses his television series "Extrapolations," and his latest album, "Wide Open Light."
144	"Episode 144"	April 24, 2023	Seal
Seal stops by to chat about his 30th Anniversary Tour commemorating three decades of his landmark albums "Seal" and "Seal II." He also performs an acoustic version of "Kiss from a Rose."
145	"Episode 145"	April 25, 2023	Swizz Beatz, Jody Watley, Jordan Chiles
Swizz Beatz discusses his "Godfather of Harlem" soundtrack. Jody Watley joins Jennifer on the couch to chat about "The Jody Watley Show — Wattage Vibes Rooted in the Music." Olympic silver medalist and UCLA gymnast Jordan Chiles drops by.
146	"Episode 146"	April 26, 2023	Brendan Hunt, Tawny Cypress
Brendan Hunt drops by to chat about "Ted Lasso." Tawney Cypress discusses the latest season of her television show "Yellowjackets."
147	"Episode 147"	April 27, 2023	Milo Ventimiglia, Tori Kelly, Sophia Roe
Milo Ventimiglia discusses his television show "The Company You Keep." The voice of Meena in Sing, Tori Kelly, chats about her new single "missin u.". Sophia Roe joins Jennifer for a cooking demo and promotes her television show "Counter Space."
148	"Episode 148"	April 28, 2023	Nicole Byer, Folake Olowofoyeku
Nicole Byer chats about her television show "Grand Crew." Folake Olowofoyeku discusses her television show "Bob Hearts Abishola."
149	"Episode 149"	May 1, 2023	Meghan Trainor, Leona Lewis
Meghan Trainor chats about herdebut book, "Dear Future Mama: A TMI Guide to Pregnancy, Birth, and Motherhood from Your Bestie." Leona Lewis promotes herApple TV+ series "Jane," which features her original song "One Step Closer."
150	"Episode 150"	May 2, 2023	Martin Sheen, Emilio Estevez, Marsai Martin
Martin Sheen and Emilio Estevez drop by to talk about their movie"The Way." Marsai Martin chats about her television show "Saturdays."
151	"Episode 151"	May 3, 2023	Angel Reese, Flau'jae Johnson, Alexis Morris
LSU women's basketball NCAA champions, including Angel Reese, Flau'Jae Johnson, and Alexis Morris, join Jennifer on the couch. Jennifer welcomes back life and relationship coach Rhea Williams from Los Angeles, California, who has been in the mental health field for 20 years.
152	"Episode 152"	May 4, 2023	Chloe Bailey, Kelvin Harrison Jr.
Chloe Bailey chats about her debut album "In Pieces." Kelvin Harrison Jr. discusses his movie "Chevalier."
153	"Episode 153"	May 5, 2023	Christina Ricci, Ms. Pat
Christina Ricci stops by to chat about the latest season of "Yellowjackets." Ms. Pat discusses her television sitcom "The Ms. Pat Show."
154	"Episode 154"	May 8, 2023	Rainn Wilson, Lalah Hathaway
Rainn Wilson promotes his book "Soul Boom" and Peacock docuseries "Geography of Bliss." Lalah Hathaway discusses her new single "The Energy."
155	"Episode 155"	May 9, 2023	Holly Robinson Peete
Holly Robinson Peete chats about her reality television show "Queens Court."
156	"Episode 156"	May 10, 2023	Ike Barinholtz
Ike Barinholtz stops by to chat about his television show "White House Plumbers." Jennifer welcomes back "Vibe Check" podcast hosts Zach Stafford, Sam Sanders, and Saeed Jones.
157	"Episode 157"	May 11, 2023	Priyanka Chopra Jonas, Charity Lawson, Lewis Howes
Priyanka Chopra Jonas discusses her new film "Love Again" and the Amazon series "Citadel." Charity Lawson, Season 20 star of "The Bachelorette," sits down with Jennifer for her first on-camera interview. Lewis Howes chats about his New York Times bestselling book, "The Greatness Mindset: Unlock the Power of Your Mind and Live Your Best Life Today."
158	"Episode 158"	May 12, 2023	Russell Westbrook, Nina Westbrook
Russell and Nina Westbrook discuss their Why Not? Foundation and the card game "Do Tell."
159	"Episode 159"	May 15, 2023	Julianne Hough, Nina Dobrev
Julianne Hough and Nina Dobrev promote their Fresh Vine Wine.
160	"Episode 160"	May 16, 2023	Jeannie Mai Jenkins, Robin Thede
Jeannie Mai Jenkins promotes Owl's Brew Boozy Tea. Robin Thede chats about her television show "A Black Lady Sketch Show."
161	"Episode 161"	May 17, 2023	Wilmer Valderrama, Tarek El Moussa, Heather El Moussa
Wilmer Valderrama drops by to talk about the latest season of "NCIS." Tarek and Heather El Moussa chat about "Flipping 101 with Tarek El Moussa."
162	"Episode 162"	May 18, 2023	Vanessa Williams, Travis Bennett
Vanessa Williams chats about her reality television show "Queen of the Universe." Travis Bennett talks about his television show "Dave."
163	"Episode 163"	May 19, 2023	Henry Winkler, Laura Harrier
Henry Winkler drops by to discuss the final season of "Barry." Laura Harrier chats about her upcoming movie "White Men Can't Jump."
164	"Episode 164"	May 22, 2023	Samuel L. Jackson
Samuel L. Jackson chats about his television show "Secret Invasion."
165	"Episode 165"	May 23, 2023	Robert Glasper, Rhea Williams
Five-time Grammy Award-winning musician and producer Robert Glasper stops by to chat about the 2023 Blue Note Jazz Festival in Napa, California. Life coach Rhea Williams joins Jennifer on the couch.
166	"Episode 166"	May 24, 2023	Jesse Tyler Ferguson, Lily Rabe
Jesse Tyler Ferguson promotes his podcast "Dinner's on Me with Jesse Tyler Ferguson." Lily Rabe talks about her television show "Love & Death."
167	"Episode 167"	May 25, 2023	Bebe Rexha, Ego Nwodim
Bebe Rexha promotes her new album "Bebe." Ego Nwodim chats about "Saturday Night Live."
168	"Episode 168"	May 26, 2023	Issa Rae, Bill Bellamy
Issa Rae chats about her new movie "Spider-Man: Across the Spider-Verse." Bill Bellamy discusses his book "Top Billin': Stories of Laughter, Lessons, and Triumph."

=== Season 2 (2023–2024) ===
No.	Title	Original release date	Guest(s)
169	"Season 2 Premiere"	October 2, 2023	None
Jennifer kicks off season 2 by welcoming superfan couple Traci Caudle and Pat Jean-Baptiste, from Los Angeles, CA who were married this past summer. Traci and Pat receive a special surprise from Jennifer on their wedding day that they'll never forget. Jennifer also welcomes Tiare Lawrence from Lahaina, HI who recently gained national attention for her philanthropic work after the Maui Fires that broke out in August.
170	"Episode 170"	October 3, 2023	Gwen Stefani, Niall Horan
The Voice coaches Gwen Stefani and Niall Horan join Jennifer in-studio to talk about the twenty-fourth season.
171	"Episode 171"	October 4, 2023	Taye Diggs, Cody Rigsby
Taye Diggs chats about his new podcast You Had Me At Hello. Peloton instructor Cody Rigsby joins Jennifer to discuss his book Xoxo, Cody: An Opinionated Homosexual's Guide to Self-Love, Relationships, and Tactful Pettiness.
172	"Episode 172"	October 5, 2023	Cedric the Entertainer
Jennifer chats with comedian Cedric the Entertainer, talking about his debut novel Flipping Boxcars and his latest venture launching barbeque label AC Barbeque with fellow comedian, Anthony Anderson.
173	"Episode 173"	October 6, 2023	Shaquille O'Neal
Season 2 premiere week wraps with NBA legend Shaquille O'Neal who discusses his upcoming gala The Event held in Las Vegas.
174	"Episode 174"	October 9, 2023	Reneé Rapp, Derek Fisher
Reneé Rapp chats about her album Snow Angel and performs her single "Tummy Hurts." Five-time NBA champion and former Los Angeles Laker Derek Fisher stops by. Jennifer welcomes motivational speaker and pre-K teacher Alethea Crimmins, who decided to "turn pain into purpose" after being bullied for years
175	"Episode 175"	October 10, 2023	Tori Kelly
Tori Kelly stops by to chat with Jennifer about her EP tori. Jennifer welcomes the Laffin family, who made headlines for discovering the children they adopted separately are biologically related.
176	"Episode 176"	October 11, 2023	Robin Thicke
Robin Thicke chats about The Masked Singer, his television show on FOX. Jennifer welcomes pracademics Kristi Hadfield from Belpre, Ohio, and Molly Jones from Pennsboro, West Virginia.
177	"Episode 177"	October 12, 2023	Kevin Nealon
Kevin Nealon stops by to talk about his new comedy tour. Jennifer welcomes medical students and friends Irvin Garcia and Alexis Aleman, who have gone viral for their social media page Foos in Medicine, highlighting what it's like being a Latino medical student.
178	"Episode 178"	October 13, 2023	Alex Rodriguez
Alex Rodriguez from the Minnesota Timberwolves chats about OraPharma.
179	"Episode 179"	October 16, 2023	Pentatonix
Pentatonix come by to talk about their tour and album Pentatonix: The Greatest Christmas Hits. Jennifer welcomes WRCB affiliate anchor couple Cornelia Nicholson and Riley Nagel from Chattanooga, Tennessee, whose on-air proposal video went viral. Jennifer welcomes Holliday's Helping Hands founder Katina Holiday "Miss Holliday" from Los Angeles, California. The nonprofit organization helps LA County's general unhoused population and young mothers released from incarceration get back on their feet.
180	"Episode 180"	October 17, 2023	Ms. Pat
Ms. Pat promotes her new BET judge series Ms. Pat Settles It and comedy tour Ya Girl Done Made It. Jennifer welcomes viral dancer 6-year-old Salome Rivas ("Baby Salo") from Miami, Florida, who is known for her videos dancing to Latin music, especially reggaeton. Jennifer welcomes professor and The Princess Within Foundation founder Dr. Bernada Baker, and her 6-yeaar-old daughter Bella Baker, from Houston, Texas, whom she adopted after a hurricane.
181	"Episode 181"	October 18, 2023	Tiffani Thiessen
Tiffani Thiessen discusses her cookbook, Here We Go Again: Recipes and Inspiration to Level Up Your Leftovers. Jennifer welcomes 7-year-old author Cassidy Bridges from Brooklyn, New York, who went viral for her response to a stranger complimenting her hair, where she said: "Thank you, it's an Afro!". This May, Cassidy released a book titled Thank You, It's An Afro, which became a #1 Amazon bestseller. Jennifer welcomes etiquette expert and author Myka Meier from New York, New York, who is the founder of Beaumont Etiquette and co-founder of the Plaza Hotel's Finishing Program.
182	"Episode 182"	October 19, 2023	Taye Diggs
Taye Diggs promotes his new podcast You Had Me at Hello. Jennifer welcomes medical students and friends Irvin Garcia and Alexis Aleman from Los Angeles, California, whose social media page Foos in Medicine went viral which highlights what it's like being a Latino medical student.
183	"Episode 183"	October 20, 2023	Tyler Cameron, Nick Viall
Tyler Cameron & Nick Viall promote FOX's Special Forces: World's Toughest Test. Jennifer welcomes 3Ls: Literacy, Leadership and Liberation founder Sabrina "Bri" Moore from Oakland, California. The nonprofit organization founder teaches kids and adults in the community how to read.
184	"Episode 184"	October 23, 2023	Carrie Ann Inaba
Carrie Ann Inaba promotes Dancing with the Stars. Jennifer surprises viral kid music group Biko's Manna, including NoBiko, Manna, and Mfundo. The trio of kids will chat with Jennifer and perform. Jennifer surprises superfan Akilah Grace, and her 6-year-old daughter, Ava, from Birmingham, AL, who wrote into the show to share her breast cancer journey. Akilah was diagnosed with breast cancer in September 2021. After two years of treatments, Akilah is happy to say she's now cancer-free and wants to celebrate by coming to the show.
185	"Episode 185"	October 24, 2023	Derek Hough
Derek Hough returns to promote Dancing with the Stars.
186	"Episode 186"	October 25, 2023	Jaime Camil
Jaime Camil promotes his CBS game show, Lotería Loca. Jennifer welcomes pilot Zachary Anglin and his wife, Martyana, from Tulsa, OK. In 2019, Zack became the world's first quadruple amputee commercial pilot and flight instructor. Despite encountering regulatory barriers and repeated denials from the Federal Aviation Administration (FAA), Zack's determination led him to achieve his dream of becoming a pilot. Zack, born in Nigeria, is missing both of his hands and both of his feet.
187	"Episode 187"	October 26, 2023	Chelsea Handler, Lil Jon
Chelsea Handler returns to promote her comedy tour, Little Big Bitch. Jennifer welcomes viral TikToker 12-year-old Varonica Mitchell from Henderson, NC. Varonica's videos have garnered millions of views online and have caught the attention of numerous celebrities, including Lil Jon, who makes a surprise visit while she is performing his hit song "Snap Yo Fingers".
188	"Episode 188"	October 27, 2023	A'ja Wilson
WNBA Las Vegas Aces' MVP Champion A'ja Wilson chats with Jennifer.
189	"Episode 189"	October 30, 2023	Chris Hardwick, Carly Pearce
Chris Hardwick promotes his NBC game show The Wall. Carly Pearce discusses her Country Music Made Me Do It Tour. Jennifer welcomes 5-year-old Jelijah Diaz from Miami, Florida, who is a talented piano player with perfect pitch. Jelijah started taking lessons at the age of 3 and has won first place in local Miami competitions. Jelijah chats with Jennifer and performs while blindfolded.
190	"Episode 190"	October 31, 2023	Coi Leray, Sheila E.
Coi Leray promotes her new album Coi. Sheila E. chats with Jennifer about her CBS game show Lotería Loca.
191	"Episode 191"	November 1, 2023	Smokey Robinson
Smokey Robinson promotes his new album, Gasms.
192	"Episode 192"	November 2, 2023	Octavia Spencer
Octavia Spencer promotes the new projects she executive produced for ID/Discovery, Feds and The Lost Women of Highway 20. Jennifer spotlights accordionist Irany from Mexicali, Mexico, who grew up in a musical family where she learned to play instruments. After Irany's father gave her an accordion, she taught herself how to play. Earlier this year, she was invited to play for Karol G's Tiny Desk concert and then joined her on her U.S. stadium tour. Irany chats with Jennifer and performs.
193	"Episode 193"	November 3, 2023	Alfonso Ribeiro
Alfonso Ribeiro promotes Dancing with the Stars and America's Funniest Home Videos. Jennifer welcomes first-grade teacher Sonja White from Desoto, Texas, who went viral after she created a mock trip to Mexico for her students in celebration of Hispanic Heritage Month.
194	"Episode 194"	November 6, 2023	Casey Wilson
Casey Wilson chats about her show The Great American Baking Show: Celebrity Edition. Jennifer welcomes Inzone Project founder Terrance Wallace from Chicago, IL, whose nonprofit organization provides educational opportunities for Chicago youth from disadvantaged neighborhoods.
195	"Episode 195"	November 7, 2023	Deon Cole, Ryan Lochte
Deon Cole discusses his Netflix stand-up special, The Improv: 60 & Still Standing. 12-time Olympic medalist Ryan Lochte will teach Jennifer how to swim. Jennifer welcomes back 6-year-old Luke Tillman "Pastor Luke", and his parents Catrina and Ezra Tillman, from Fort Lauderdale, FL, who made his first appearance on the show during season one when he went viral for baptizing his Paw Patrol Dog in the bathtub.
196	"Episode 196"	November 8, 2023	Ryan Lochte
12-time Olympic medalist Ryan Lochte joins Jennifer in the studio. Jennifer welcomes viral UPS driver Carlos Cruz from New York, NY. Jennifer welcomes 5-year-old Colbie Durborow, along with her mom Amanda, from Farmingdale, NJ and her mentor Steph Roach from Phoenix, AZ. Colbie was born 17 weeks premature with cerebral palsy (CP). Steph is an inspirational fitness coach who was also born with CP and is a 6-year cancer survivor. Colbie's mom, Amanda, and Steph met through social media in February 2021 and instantly formed a close bond.
197	"Episode 197"	November 9, 2023	John Stamos
John Stamos chats about his memoir If You Would Have Told Me. Jennifer spotlights America's Got Talent tap dancer Justin Jackson.
198	"Episode 198"	November 10, 2023	Adrienne Bailon-Houghton, Israel Houghton
Adrienne Bailon-Houghton and Israel Houghton stop by to chat with Jennifer. Jennifer welcomes body language expert Vanessa Van Edwards from Austin, TX, who is a best-selling author, speaker and teacher.
199	"Episode 199"	November 13, 2023	Gabriel Iglesias, Ariana Madix
Gabriel Iglesias promotes his comedy tour Don't Worry Be Fluffy. Ariana Madix discusses competing on Dancing With the Stars. Jennifer spotlights 14-year-old singer Reid Wilson from Montgomery, Alabama, who recently started posting singing videos on social media but has already caught the attention of millions. Reid will perform and chat with Jennifer.
200	"Episode 200"	November 14, 2023	Mike Epps, Kyra Epps
Mike and Kyra Epps stop by to discuss their HGTV series, Buying Back the Block. Jennifer welcomes Cori Salazar and her husband, Zak Salazar, from Mission Viejo, California, who are parents of three children: 4-year-old Juniper, 3-year-old Delaney, and 21-month-old Luna. Last spring, their lives changed when the couple each received a cancer diagnosis just months apart.
201	"Episode 201"	November 15, 2023	Mariah Carey
Grammy Award-winning artist and "Queen of Christmas" Mariah Carey stops by as part of the show's "Legends" series. Mariah will discuss her Merry Christmas One and All! tour.
202	"Episode 202"	November 16, 2023	José Andrés
Chef and restaurateur José Andrés promotes his graphic novel, Feeding Dangerously: On the Ground with José Andrés, and World Central Kitchen.
203	"Episode 203"	November 17, 2023	Blake Shelton
Country music singer Blake Shelton discusses "Barmageddon" and the Back to the Honky Tonk tour. Jennifer welcomes 81-year-old Nora Langdon from Detroit, Michigan, a retired real estate broker turned professional powerlifter.
204	"Episode 204"	November 20, 2023	Lil Rel Howery, Tara Lipinski
Lil Rel Howery promotes his new movie Dashing Through the Snow. Olympic gold medalist and world champion Tara Lipinski discusses her podcast Unexpecting.
205	"Episode 205"	November 21, 2023	Adam Sandler
Adam Sandler promotes his new movie Leo and the I Missed You tour. Jennifer welcomes teacher Alfred "Shivy" Brooks II and his wife Crystal from Atlanta. Alfred went viral after posting a video holding a sign in front of his classroom that read, "Free hug if you need one". Alfred's late son died in April 2023 at the age of 16 while trying to save four children drowning in a rip current. Since his son's passing, Alfred says it's his duty to redefine who we see young Black males to be, and what it means to show up for young men. Jennifer spotlights viral sensation 8-year-old Ka'Nary "Kanary Yellow" Lynch from Tampa, whose rapping has garnered millions of views online. She's been reposted by numerous celebrities, from Missy Elliott to Viola Davis, and is taking the hip-hop world by storm. She will perform and chat with Jennifer.
206	"Episode 206"	November 22, 2023	Eric McCormack
Eric McCormack promotes The Other Black Girl. Jennifer welcomes couple and educators Carrie and Brett Yancey, from Southside, Alabama, who are joined by their daughters Savannah, Sydney and Sarakate. The family recently made headlines for a night they will always cherish. On September 29, Brett, who has been fighting advanced esophageal cancer for six years, made the 50-yard walk down Southside High School's football field with his daughter Sarakate, who was crowned this year's homecoming queen. Carrie, Savannah and Sydney were in the stands as their community erupted in cheers.
207	"Episode 207"	November 27, 2023	Da'Vine Joy Randolph, Tyla
Da'Vine Joy Randolph promotes her movies The Holdovers and Rustin. Tyla discusses her single "Water". Jennifer welcomes high school senior and future first-generation college student Dana Bolden from Jackson, Mississippi, who recently made headlines for being awarded over $2.2 million in scholarships from more than 50 colleges. Dana feels proud to be able to represent her community and said it is rare to see positive stories coming out of her neighborhood.
208	"Episode 208"	November 28, 2023	Henry Winkler
Henry Winkler returns to discuss his book, Being Henry: The Fonz…and Beyond. Jennifer welcomes educator Angelique Williams and her 6-year-old student Emora from Cleveland, Ohio. Angelique is the dean of students at East Academy and founder of the nonprofit Let Art Breathe, which helps her students with social-emotional learning through performing arts. Every day at school, Angelique's student Emora asks her "best friend" Angelique if she has found a husband yet. Last month, Emora decided to help Angelique by doing a little prayer at the lunch table. Angelique filmed Emora's prayer and the video has gone viral online. Jennifer welcomes 17-year-old Amber Wilsondebriano from Charleston, South Carolina, who recently made history for being crowned the first Black homecoming queen at her school, Porter-Gaud School. The school is 155 years old and has been doing homecoming court for over 40 years. Amber feels overjoyed to create a legacy that means so much and wants to inspire other young kids to know that anything is possible, regardless of their race. Amber hopes her story of representation shows people that times are changing and that there is hope, positivity, and love everywhere in the world.
209	"Episode 209"	November 29, 2023	Ellie Goulding, Nick DiGiovanni, Kristoffer Polaha
Ellie Goulding promotes her new album, Higher Than Heaven. Nick DiGiovanni promotes his cookbook, Knife Drop: Creative Recipes Anyone Can Cook and his brand Osmo Salt. Kristoffer Polaha discusses the movie A Biltmore Christmas and The Shift. Jennifer welcomes back body language expert Vanessa Van Edwards from Austin, Texas, who is a best-selling author, speaker, and teacher. Vanessa teaches science-backed people-skills.
210	"Episode 210"	November 30, 2023	Winnie Harlow, Dionne Warwick, Damon Elliott
Winnie Harlow promotes her skin care line, Cay Skin. Dionne Warwick and Damon Elliott discuss their song "I Kneel".
211	"Episode 211"	December 1, 2023	Dove Cameron
Dove Cameron promotes her debut album, Alchemical. Jennifer welcomes 4-year-old bug expert Jeremiah Davis and his mom, Taneika Weaver, from Douglasville, Georgia. Jeremiah makes educational TikTok videos about his bug knowledge. Taneika first noticed her son's interest in bugs when he was 3 years old and began educating him on different species. Jeremiah's favorite bugs are spiders and roaches, and he wants to be an entomologist when he grows up.
212	"Episode 212"	December 4, 2023	Jeannie Mai, Nick Kyrgios
Jeannie Mai promotes her CBS game show Raid the Cage. Australian tennis player Nick Kyrgios discusses his talk series Good Trouble. Jennifer welcomes DJ Brian Phoenix from Saco, Maine, whose video of him DJ'ing a wedding went viral with over 9 million views. Brian, who has been a DJ for over 40 years, said he does not fit the typical stereotype of a DJ and people are amused by the fact he uses CDs. Brian hopes this video shows people that you're never too old to live out your passion.
213	"Episode 213"	December 5, 2023	Ayesha Curry
Ayesha Curry discusses herskin care line Sweet July Skin. Jennifer welcomes back 11-year-old kid reporter Jeremiah Fennell and his mom, Lorraine Golden. Jeremiah will chat with Jennifer about what he's been up to since he was last on the show.
214	"Episode 214"	December 6, 2023	Darius Rucker
Darius Rucker promotes his new album Carolyn's Boy.
215	"Episode 215"	December 7, 2023	Demi Lovato, Ally Brooke, Davido
Demi Lovato promotes her Roku special A Very Demi Holiday Special. Ally Brooke discusses her Christmas EP Under the Tree. Grammy-nominated artist Davido will perform a medley of his songs "Feel" and "Unavailable".
216	"Episode 216"	December 8, 2023	Matthew McConaughey
Matthew McConaughey discusses his children's book Just Because and Pantalones Organic Tequila. Jennifer welcomes It's Bigger Than Us founder Tyrone Nance from Inglewood, California, whose nonprofit, established in 2020, provides solution-based resources to underserved families in South Los Angeles.
217	"Episode 217"	December 11, 2023	Jeffrey Wright, Tracee Ellis Ross, Erika Alexander, Melissa Peterman
The cast of American Fiction, including Jeffrey Wright, Tracee Ellis Ross, and Erika Alexander stop by. Melissa Peterman promotes the FOX game show Person, Place, or Thing.
218	"Episode 218"	December 12, 2023	Tony Shalhoub
Tony Shalhoub chats about Mr. Monk's Last Case: A Monk Movie. Jennifer welcomes 15-year-old Dejuan "DJ" Strickland from St. Louis, Missouri, who made headlines for raising money to eliminate school lunch debt for students at his former elementary school through his initiative Team Tech Boy Lunch Heroes. DJ decided to create this initiative after he experienced what it was like not having enough money for school lunch when he was in fourth grade. Jennifer welcomes Adrene "AC" Clemons from Las Vegas, Nevada, an assistant director of the Boys and Girls Club South Nevada (BGCSNV). At 9 months old, AC was badly burned and his parents were told he wouldn't survive 72 hours. After spending two years in intensive care, AC grew up to become a performer and high school sports star. AC began helping children with disabilities to read, write, sing, and dance at BGCSNV, and the clubhouse says, "AC is one of the most inspirational staff members, loved by not only the kids but the staff as well, due to his contagious positive spirit."
219	"Episode 219"	December 13, 2023	Drew Scott, Jonathan Scott
Property Brothers Drew and Jonathan Scott chat about Celebrity IOU. Jennifer welcomes superfan 11-year-old Ar'Miah Gilchrist, her parents Mariah and Jamie, and her brothers Jamie, Cayden, and Christian from Prince George, Virginia. A few months after Ar'Miah was born, doctors told Mariah and Jamie that their daughter was blind and had a growth hormone deficiency. Growing up, Ar'Miah experienced everything from bullying at school to getting made fun of in public. To show the world her daughter was capable of anything she set her mind to, Mariah started recording motivational videos capturing Ar'Miah's infectious energy that have gone viral.
220	"Episode 220"	December 14, 2023	Janelle Monáe
Janelle Monáe discusses her album The Age of Pleasure.
221	"Episode 221"	December 15, 2023	Oprah Winfrey, Blitz Bazawule, Fantasia Barrino Taylor, Danielle Brooks, Taraji P. Henson, Phylicia Pearl Mpasi, Corey Hawkins, Colman Domingo
Oprah Winfrey, director Blitz Bazawule and the cast of The Color Purple, including Fantasia Barrino Taylor, Danielle Brooks, Taraji P. Henson, Phylicia Pearl Mpasi, Corey Hawkins and Colman Domingo are set to appear on The Jennifer Hudson Show for an exclusive cast talk show appearance airing on Friday, December 15. The new musical adaptation of The Color Purple will open in theaters on December 25.
222	"Episode 222"	December 22, 2023	Jason Momoa, Raul Midón
Jason Momoa promotes his new film Aquaman and the Lost Kingdom. Jennifer welcomes two-time Grammy-nominated singer, songwriter and guitarist Raul Midón from Laurel, MD. Originally from New Mexico, Raul was blinded at birth by an incubator after being born prematurely. He studied jazz at the University of Miami, and after college, he performed as a background vocalist for many Latin artists. He went on to have a successful music career, working with industry legends like Bill Withers, Stevie Wonder, and Sting. Jennifer welcomes coach and superfan Treena Moore from Baltimore, MD, who was surprised recently during the show's first-ever "Knock Star" school visit. Jennifer had surprised Treena and the step team of Harlem Park Elementary-Middle School earlier this year.
223	"Episode 223"	January 2, 2024	Kumail Nanjiani, Teddy Swims
Kumail Nanjiani discusses his new film Migration. Teddy Swims performs his hit song "Lose Control" from his debut album, I've Tried Everything But Therapy, Part 1.
224	"Episode 224"	January 3, 2024	Tia Mowry
Tia Mowry discusses her new cooking series Not Like Mama and her hair care line, 4U by Tia. Jennifer welcomes back motivational speaker Alethea Crimmins from Lafayette, LA, who will be providing motivation to start the new year. Jennifer welcomes Shundrika Houston and her husband, Edward, from Houston, TX, for a Zoom gender reveal. Shundrika wrote to the show, saying this pregnancy was a surprise and they were shocked to learn they are expecting twins due in May! Shundrika and Edward are already parents to two boys, Garrison and Gavin, and they can't wait to become a family of six.
225	"Episode 225"	January 4, 2024	Howie Mandel
Howie Mandel returns to the show to discuss AGT: Fantasy League and Deal Or No Deal.
226	"Episode 226"	January 5, 2024	Roy Wood Jr., Joshua Weissman
Roy Wood Jr. promotes his comedy tour, America: For The Last Time. Chef and digital personality Joshua Weissman discusses his cookbook Joshua Weissman: Texture Over Taste and does a cooking demo. Jennifer welcomes the Labastida Twins, 11-year-old Bryce and 11-year-old Matt from Orange County, CA, who have gained a large following online with their dancing videos. They each say that having a twin brother has encouraged them to face their fears and not care what people think; they hope to inspire other kids to do the same.
227	"Episode 227"	January 8, 2024	Mario López
Mario Lopez promotes his hosting duties on Access. Jennifer welcomes back content creator Ulysses "Uly" Morazan. Ulysses will chat with Jennifer about dating in the new year and New Year's resolutions.
228	"Episode 228"	January 9, 2024	Garcelle Beauvais
Garcelle Beauvais discusses The Real Housewives of Beverly Hills. Jennifer spotlights country-singing trio Remember Monday from London, U.K. The group is composed of Lauren Byrne, Holly-Anne Hull, and Charlotte Steele, who originally found fame in the quarterfinals of The Voice U.K. (2019) as part of Team JHud. They will perform and chat with Jennifer.
229	"Episode 229"	January 10, 2024	Jerry O'Connell
Jerry O'Connell promotes his game show Pictionary. Jennifer welcomes Kelly Flowers from Dallas, TX, the founder of non-profit Women Leading Technology, which focuses on bringing diversity and equity into the tech space through programs for young girls. As a woman in tech, Kelly was often the only woman and the only person of color on her team. In 2018, Kelly started a LinkedIn Group where she invited other women working in tech to connect and figure out ways to get more women interested in the space. Today, Women Leading Technology is an official non-profit that she calls a "technology sorority". Jennifer welcomes 84-year-old skydiver Kim Emmons Knor from Denver, CO. She knew at age five that she wanted to one day jump out of a plane after her uncle returned home from World War II with a military parachute. Years later, she was one of only two women who competed against men in the U.S. team tryouts in 1961, and in 1962 she made history as a member of the first Women's Parachute Team, winning gold at the 6th World Parachuting Championships. She has completed over 600 jumps and is currently in pursuit of earning her Gold Wings for 1,000 jumps.
230	"Episode 230"	January 11, 2024	Rich Paul, Saint Harison
Rich Paul promotes his book Lucky Me: A Memoir of Changing the Odds. Saint Harison performs his hit song "Ego Talkin". Jennifer welcomes six-year-old Nathan Katcher and his mother, Rachel, from St. Louis, MO. Nathan has been making headlines for his ability to solve long-equation math problems. Rachel started posting his videos on TikTok to share Nathan's love for math with the world. Nathan has always been fascinated by numbers and by age four, he was counting to 6,000. Nathan solves all math problems in his head and hopes to be a math scientist when he gets older.
231	"Episode 231"	January 12, 2024	Molly Sims, Arianna Choi, J. Ivy
Molly Sims discusses her skincare line YSE Beauty and her podcast Lipstick on the Rim. Jennifer welcomes Olympic fencer Arianna Choi from Orlando, FL, who is the top-ranked 9-year-old fencer in the USA. She won her first tournament within one week of learning to fence and has never looked back. Winning six gold medals in her first year of fencing, she added another 16 tournament wins at the end of her second year. Arianna will chat and teach Jennifer how to fence. Interview and performance by Grammy-winning poet J. IVY (album The Light Inside). He will perform spoken word with his wife, Tarrey Torae. J. Ivy was the first poet since Dr. Maya Angelou to win a Grammy.
232	"Episode 232"	January 15, 2024	Kaley Cuoco
Kaley Cuoco discusses her film Role Play and her pet line Oh Norman! Jennifer welcomes Arlene Felder from Burlington, New Jersey, who is the founder of Glassy Brown Cookies. After 15 years as a social worker, Arlene took a leap of faith and pursued her passion and now has two storefronts, ships nationwide, and leads cookie classes. She still loves giving back and supports her community by offering free consultations to small business owners and hosting free cookie classes for youth.
233	"Episode 233"	January 16, 2024	Craig Robinson, Shanola Hampton
Craig Robinson promotes his Peacock comedy series Killing It. Shanola Hampton discusses her NBC drama series Found. Jennifer will spotlight singer Gabriel Henrique from Brazil, who was recently made it to the Top 3 on Season 18 of America's Got Talent. He will perform and chat with Jennifer.
234	"Episode 234"	January 17, 2024	Reggie Watts
Reggie Watts discusses his book Great Falls, MT: Fast Times, Post-Punk Weirdos and a Tale of Coming Home Again. Jennifer welcomes closet therapist Shaniece Jones from Los Angeles, California, who is a biologist-turned-pro closet organizer and declutter expert. Having spent the last 10 years in the closets of celebrities, executives, and entrepreneurs, her inner researcher has continued to study people and the effects their home environments have on them. Shaniece's goal is to curate aesthetically pleasing and functional spaces that allow clients more time to live their lives.
235	"Episode 235"	January 18, 2024	Lilly Singh
Lilly Singh discusses her children's animated series The Mindful Adventures of Unicorn Island. Jennifer welcomes body language expert Vanessa Van Edwards from Austin, Texas, who is an author, speaker, and teacher. Vanessa teaches science-backed people-skills. Jennifer welcomes finance expert Ramit Sethi (podcast, I Will Teach You to Be Rich).
236	"Episode 236"	January 19, 2024	Heidi Klum
Heidi Klum promotes America's Got Talent: Fantasy League. Jennifer welcomes animal communicator Nikki Vasconez from Philadelphia, Pennsylvania. Nikki is an attorney-turned-animal communicator who offers her clients readings with their pets and teaches them how to have two-way conversations with animals. Nikki will chat and do a reading with Jennifer.
237	"Episode 237"	January 22, 2024	Common
Common promotes his new book, And Then We Rise. Jennifer welcomes Tiffany Miranda from Los Angeles, CA, who is the founder of Girls Make Beats. The nonprofit organization empowers young girls in underserved communities to become music producers, DJs, and audio engineers. Tiffany's goal is to bridge the gender inequality gap in music production and give young women access to life-changing opportunities.
238	"Episode 238"	January 23, 2024	Anthony Anderson, Doris Bowman
Anthony Anderson and Doris Bowman promote their game show We Are Family. Jennifer welcomes back Leanne Zapanta, and her husband, Raz, from Mission Hills, CA. Leanne and Raz visited the show last season when we surprised Leanne's bridal party during the show and gifted the couple a honeymoon. Since then, Leanne and Raz got married and went on their honeymoon. Leanne and Raz will chat with Jennifer and will give her a life update.
239	"Episode 239"	January 24, 2024	Paris Hilton, Kathy Hilton, Joel Kim Booster
Paris Hilton promotes Paris In Love and her podcast, Trapped In Treatment. Paris is joined by her mother Kathy Hilton. Joel Kim Booster discusses his Freeform series Chrissy & Dave Dine Out. Jennifer welcomes Dr. Kwane Stewart from San Diego, CA, who is known as "The Street Vet." Dr. Kwane is a veterinarian who has quietly volunteered his time walking the city streets of California and given free veterinary services to the pets of unhoused people. In 2020, Dr. Kwane founded the nonprofit Project Street Vet to expand this important work and provide more support to those in need. Dr. Kwane was recently named CNN's 2023 Hero of the Year.
240	"Episode 240"	January 25, 2024	Mel B
Mel B discusses America's Got Talent: Fantasy League. Jennifer welcomes celebrity chef Lorenzo Espada, aka "Eatwitzo", from Charlotte, NC, who is best recognized for posting popular cooking tutorials online. Growing up, Zo's parents always found a way to make something out of nothing and that family motto stuck with him. Zo started cooking in college, selling hot plates to students and locals to make ends meet. Now he's a sought-after chef and specializes in creating traditional classics with a twist. Zo will perform a cooking demo and chat with Jennifer.
241	"Episode 241"	January 26, 2024	Snoop Dogg
Snoop Dogg discusses his new movie The Underdoggs. Jennifer welcomes back etiquette expert and best-selling author Myka Meier from New York, NY, who is the founder of Beaumont Etiquette and co-founder of the Plaza Hotel's Finishing Program. Through her books, courses, and social media, Myka provides a wide variety of modern tips, tricks, and resources on etiquette. Myka will chat with Jennifer and demonstrate table etiquette. Jennifer welcomes Ryan Peter Murphy and Bradley Rittmann from Boston, MA, both who are students at the Berklee College of Music. They gained popularity online by busking on the streets and in the parks of Boston. Jennifer recently surprised them when she visited Boston to host the city's official tree lighting ceremony. They will perform and chat with Jennifer.
242	"Episode 242"	January 29, 2024	Charlie Wilson
Charlie Wilson promotes his new single "Superman." Jennifer welcomes community activist Devine Carama from Lexington, Kentucky, who is a motivational speaker and runs the nonprofit ONE Lexington. The nonprofit group helps address and prevent crime among youth in Devine's community. Devine recently went viral for teaching his mentoring class of young boys about emotional intelligence and says he sees himself in many of the young kids and families he helps. He was once a struggling single father and now uses his experience to mentor kids and young adults.
243	"Episode 243"	January 30, 2024	Anthony Hamilton
Singer-songwriter Anthony Hamilton stops by.
244	"Episode 244"	January 31, 2024	Joey Graziadei, Harvey Mason Jr., Derek Fisher
The Bachelor Joey Graziadei comes by. CEO of The Recording Academy Harvey Mason Jr. promotes the 66th Annual Grammy Awards. Former Los Angeles Laker and five-time NBA champion Derek Fisher stops by.
245	"Episode 245"	February 1, 2024	D-Nice
DJ, actor, and producer D-Nice joins Jennifer on the show.
246	"Episode 246"	February 2, 2024	Kylie Minogue
Pop singer Kylie Minogue stops by the show.
247	"Episode 247"	February 5, 2024	Rev Run
Rev Run promotes Kings from Queens: The Run DMC Story. Jennifer welcomes Los Angeles Room & Board founder Sam Prater from Los Angeles, California, whose organization helps ensure students can complete their college degrees without food and housing insecurities. The organization consists of four locations in the city that create a safe living space for 190 students each year. Originally from Detroit, Sam dropped out of high school and struggled to become independent. He later went on to earn a bachelor's, master's, and doctorate. His dream is to end homelessness in the city.
248	"Episode 248"	February 6, 2024	Chrissy Teigen
Chrissy Teigen discusses Chrissy & Dave Dine Out and her baking brand Cravings by Chrissy Teigen.
249	"Episode 249"	February 7, 2024	Beth Behrs, David Guetta
Beth Behrs promotes her CBS comedy series The Neighborhood. David Guetta discusses his new single, "When We Were Young", featuring Kim Petras.
250	"Episode 250"	February 8, 2024	Monica, Black Pumas
Grammy-winning R&B singer Monica stops by! Black Pumas will perform their latest single "Ice Cream (Pay Phone)" from their album Chronicles of a Diamond. Jennifer welcomes 4-year-old preschool student Summer and her parents Marvin and Janyl, from Fort Lauderdale, Florida. Summer is an aspiring surgeon and loves talking about bones, surgical procedures, and anything related to the medical field. She is known online for her dinnertime conversations with her dad, Dr. Marvin Smith (an orthopedic surgeon), where she asks him about the surgeries he performed that day.
251	"Episode 251"	February 9, 2024	Babyface
Jennifer Hudson gets ready for Super Bowl LVIII! Musical artist Babyface promotes his album Girls Night Out.
252	"Episode 252"	February 12, 2024	Donald Faison, Bobby Berk
Donald Faison promotes his comedy series Extended Family. Bobby Berk discusses the new season of Queer Eye and his Tri Pointe Homes partnership.
253	"Episode 253"	February 13, 2024	Sarah Silverman
Sarah Silverman promotes Stupid Pet Tricks. Basketball coach "Lethal Shooter" Chris Matthews preps Jennifer for the NBA All-Star Celebrity Game. Jennifer welcomes Amber Kemp-Gerstel from Miami, Florida, who is a child psychologist turned full-time crafter. She says her "doable-DIY" approach takes away the complication, intimidation, and frustration of crafting and gives you all the info you need to jump headfirst into the DIY life. Amber will do a Valentine's Day-themed crafting demo.
254	"Episode 254"	February 14, 2024	Coco Jones
Coco Jones stops by the show for a special Valentine's Day Celebration. Astrologer Jennifer Freed, author of the book A Map to Your Soul, offers a Valentine's Day astrology demo.
255	"Episode 255"	February 15, 2024	Gina Torres, Lil Mike
Gina Torres promotes her show 9-1-1: Lone Star. Jennifer welcomes back 5-year-old Lil Mike and his dad, Mike Jones, from Williamsburg, Virginia, who first appeared earlier in the season. Lil Mike showed off his basketball skills and was surprised by Shaq and received tickets to his first NBA game. Since then, he has started learning new skills, and Mike says people still recognize him from being on the show. Lil Mike will help prepare Jennifer to play in the NBA All-Star Celebrity Game.
256	"Episode 256"	February 16, 2024	Billy Gardell
Billy Gardell discusses his comedy series Bob Hearts Abishola. Jennifer welcomes Shay Jefferson from Belton, Missouri, who is the founder and Executive Director of Family Resource Center. The nonprofit provides support and resources for families in Missouri and has 12 centers across the state that provide essentials ranging from baby supplies, food, clothes, etc. all free of charge. Shay says fundraising for her nonprofit is a constant struggle and in order to keep the 12 locations open, she doesn't take a salary.
257	"Episode 257"	February 19, 2024	will.i.am, Brian Kleinschmidt, Mika Kleinschmidt
will.i.am discusses his two AI-powered entertainment initiatives, FYI.Ai and Sound Drive. Brian and Mika Kleinschmidt from 100 Day Dream Home kick off HGTV Week!
258	"Episode 258"	February 20, 2024	Erin Napier, Ben Napier, Page Turner, Brandy Clark
HGTV Week continues with Erin & Ben Napier (HGTV's Home Town). Page Turner (HGTV's Rock the Block) stops by. Brandy Clark discusses her self-titled album. Jennifer welcomes Baileigh Sinaman-Daniel from Swannanoa, NC, who recently made headlines as a one-armed D3 college basketball player at Warren Wilson College. Baileigh was born with a birth defect that caused her right arm to not fully develop. She started playing basketball in her freshman year of high school and was unexpectedly cut from the team during her senior year. She was determined to continue her basketball career and made her college team. Baileigh hopes to inspire others and show them that anything is possible.
259	"Episode 259"	February 21, 2024	Egypt Sherrod, Mike Jackson, Sanaa Lathan
HGTV Week continues with Egypt Sherrod & Mike Jackson from HGTV's Married to Real Estate. Sanaa Lathan promotes her new Audible series The Justice.
260	"Episode 260"	February 22, 2024	Cole DeBoer, Chelsea DeBoer, Kane Brown
HGTV Week continues with Cole & Chelsea DeBoer (HGTV's Down Home Fab). Kane Brown promotes his In The Air tour and his new single, "I Can Feel It".
261	"Episode 261"	February 23, 2024	Drew Scott, Jonathan Scott, Dave Marrs, Jenny Marrs, Lil Jon
HGTV Week continues with Drew & Jonathan Scott (HGTV's Celebrity IOU). Dave & Jenny Marrs (HGTV's Fixer to Fabulous and Fixer to Fabulous: Italiano) stop by. Lil Jon discusses his HGTV series Lil Jon Wants to Do What? Jennifer welcomes Dr. Theresa Price from Walnut, CA, the Founder and CEO of the National College Resources Foundation and the Black College Expo. The organization's mission is to reduce high school dropout rate and increase enrollment to degree and/or certificate programs among students in underserved and underrepresented communities. For 25 years, Dr. Price has helped over 600,000 students of color get into college and has helped secure over $5 billion in scholarships.
262	"Episode 262"	February 26, 2024	Derek Hough
Derek Hough stops by to talk about the Symphony of Dance tour. Jennifer welcomes Route 1 founder Marcus Carpenter from Minneapolis, Minnesota, whose organization increases food access and decreases the racial hunger divide by empowering, encouraging, and educating BIPOC farmers. Jennifer is also joined by 11-year-old kid scientist Linda Pistun from Gainesville, Virginia, who founded Linda's Lab, a nonprofit focused on ending world hunger and improving science education in schools. To combat hunger, Linda created a chocolate bar using mealworm protein that she is working to make shelf stable. To help improve science education, she wrote a book called Linda and the Mysterious Footprints about girl who uses science to help fix the carbon footprint in her town. She will chat with Jennifer and perform a science demo.
263	"Episode 263"	February 27, 2024	Karen Pittman
Karen Pittman comes by to discuss her Apple TV+ series The Morning Show. Jennifer then welcomes teen archers Caelan and Milla Shanklin — the Shanklin Twins — from Castle Rock, Colorado, who both hold state championship titles and records in their state. Caelan is also a national champion and aspires to compete in the 2028 Olympics. They love teaching archery and say it's a sport anyone can become good at, no matter their body type. They will chat with Jennifer and perform a demo. Jennifer welcomes viral couple Rita Smith and Theodore Smith Sr. from New Orleans, Louisiana, who have gained popularity through Rita's videos, which offer a glimpse inside their love life. The Louisiana native, who has been married to Theodore for four decades, has become a voice of wisdom with her advice on intimacy tips, valuing partnership, fun date nights, and the importance of feminine necessities, including perfume and lingerie. Jennifer welcomes Housing Resources Inc. Board of Directors Vice President Lawanda Chambers from Milwaukee, WI. The nonprofit organization helps individuals and families purchase their own homes. Lawanda who the organization once helped will chat with Jennifer.
264	"Episode 264"	February 28, 2024	Shemar Moore
S.W.A.T. actor Shemar Moore joins Jennifer in the studio. Jennifer then welcomes teen archers Caelan and Milla Shanklin — the Shanklin Twins — from Castle Rock, Colorado, who both hold state championship titles and records in their state. Caelan is also a national champion and aspires to compete in the 2028 Olympics. They love teaching archery and say it's a sport anyone can become good at, no matter their body type. They will chat with Jennifer and perform a demo.
265	"Episode 265"	February 29, 2024	Magic Johnson, Nicole Avant
Magic Johnson stops by to chat with Jennifer. Nicole Avant, author of the memoir Think You'll Be Happy: Moving Through Grief with Grit, Grace and Gratitude, joins Jennifer to chat about her book.
266	"Episode 266"	March 1, 2024	La La Anthony, Nichelle Lewis
La La Anthony of Starz's BMF joins Jennifer in the studio. Plus, Jennifer interviews Nichelle Lewis, who will perform "Home" from the original Broadway musical The Wiz.
267	"Episode 267"	March 4, 2024	Tichina Arnold
Tichina Arnold from The Neighborhood drops by. Jennifer welcomes back David Riherd, the co-founder of Wildlife Learning Center (WLC), a zoological park in Sylmar, California, with baby animals, including baby bunnies and a baby giraffe! WLC cares for more than 100 displaced, rescued, and zoo-born wild animals. Jennifer welcomes 72-year-old drummer Dorothea Taylor from Myrtle Beach, South Carolina. Dorothea started playing drums when she was little and has captivated people across the world with her talent. Her grandson helped her start a TikTok during the pandemic, and since has amassed over 1.5 million followers. She will chat with Jennifer and perform.
268	"Episode 268"	March 5, 2024	Ziggy Marley
Ziggy Marley discusses the documentary Bob Marley: One Love. Pet trainer Brandon McMillan from Lucky Dog Reunions brings his furry friends to the show.
269	"Episode 269"	March 6, 2024	Jon Cryer, Abigail Spencer
Jon Cryer and Abigail Spencer promote Extended Family. Jennifer welcomes viral professional figure skaters Mariyah Gerber and Peter Gerber from Phoenix, Arizona, who met while performing for Disney on Ice in 2015. When the pandemic hit, they decided to do their routines at home and share the videos online, which have garnered millions of views. Jennifer welcomes Robyn Roberts from Las Vegas, Nevada, who has made headlines for graduating from college at age 63 while working as a truck driver and driving across the country. Most of her studies and schoolwork were done from inside the bed of her semi-truck. Obtaining her bachelor's degree was a big accomplishment for Robyn, as she once struggled with addiction and homelessness and never thought it was possible. She plans to attend law school next year and hopes to inspire others.
270	"Episode 270"	March 7, 2024	Daniel Dae Kim
Daniel Dae Kim promotes his Netflix series Avatar: The Last Airbender. Jennifer welcomes Melissa Carnegie from Charlotte, North Carolina, who created Kicks & Fros, a digital lifestyle brand and community that celebrates sneaker culture and Black and Brown women in the space. Melissa says women of color are often overlooked and undervalued in the sneaker world, even though they bring so much to the culture. Through Kicks & Fros, Melissa aims to address the underrepresentation of women in the sneaker world.
271	"Episode 271"	March 8, 2024	Offset, Wolfgang Puck
Offset visits to chat about his Set It Off tour. Jennifer welcomes Daughter Sister Stepper Dancer (DSSD) step coach LaTodda Wallace from Atlanta, Georgia, whose youth program serves ages 4 through college. LaTodda grew up in foster care and says her middle school step coaches saved her life. In 2016, she opened DSSD to provide support and mentorship to girls in her community. Today, LaTodda has helped over 3,000 female youth and their families, and her team has won numerous state and national awards. Jennifer will chat with LaTodda before she is joined by her 7-year-old daughter, Nyala, and two 16-year-olds from the team, Ravyn and Ondreja, who will showcase a few step moves. Governors Ball chef Wolfgang Puck gives an Oscars demo.
272	"Episode 272"	March 11, 2024	James Pickens Jr.
James Pickens Jr. will discuss Grey's Anatomy. Jennifer welcomes Curls on the Block founder Analise Harris from West Covina, CA. As a Black educator in her Colorado school, Analise says she noticed Black students would gravitate toward her and witnessed girls being teased for their natural hair. She created the organization to build a bridge between STEAM and beauty for girls with curly hair. The students in the program learn how to take care of their natural hair while also implementing science and math skills. Jennifer welcomes Olympian Arianna Choi from Orlando, FL, who is the number one rated nine-year-old fencer in the USA and has won fencing competitions coast to coast. She won her first tournament within one week of learning to fence and never looked back. Winning six Gold Medals in her first year of fencing, she added another 16 tournament wins at the end of her second year. She will teach Jennifer how to fence.
273	"Episode 273"	March 12, 2024	JoJo Siwa, Allison Holker, Maksim Chmerkovskiy
So You Think You Can Dance judges JoJo Siwa, Allison Holker, and Maksim Chmerkovskiy stop by.
274	"Episode 274"	March 13, 2024	Jesse Palmer, Shaun Robinson
Jesse Palmer promotes The Bachelor. Shaun Robinson discusses TLC's 90 Day: The Single Life Tell All. Jennifer welcomes Savaree "Sav" Hazard-Chaney from Providence, RI, who founded Tuft X PVD, a studio space where she teaches the art of tufted rugs and recently opened a brick and mortar. She currently teaches workshops and has been featured in museums and high-end hotels. Savaree will teach Jennifer how to tuft a rug.
275	"Episode 275"	March 14, 2024	Minnie Driver, Jonny Moseley, Clay Gravesande, AD Smith, Johnny McIntyre, Amy Cortés
Minnie Driver will discuss her new movie Uproar. Olympic gold medalist and freestyle skier Jonny Moseley stops by. Love Is Blind cast members Clay Gravesande, AD Smith, Johnny McIntyre & Amy Cortés reunite on the show.
276	"Episode 276"	March 15, 2024	Boris Kodjoe, Kate Flannery
Boris Kodjoe will promote his ABC drama series Station 19. Jennifer welcomes viral sensation 4-year-old Christopher Bess and his dad Reginald, from Tarboro, NC, also known as "Coach Chris" for his hilarious videos helping his dad coach high school basketball. Chris became a beloved member of the local sports community and was recently named Youth Coach of the Year. Kate Flannery will discuss her new movie The Prank and perform a St. Patrick's Day cooking demo.
277	"Episode 277"	March 18, 2024	Joe Manganiello
Joe Manganiello promotes Deal or No Deal Island. Jennifer welcomes Dre'Shon Jackson from Florence, SC. Last month, a video of Dre'Shon reacting to his acceptance letter from Harvard University went viral. Dre'Shon said he is being recognized everywhere he goes and is referred to as the local "hero of hope". Dre'Shon says he lives in a rural town that faces a lot of challenges, and he hopes to be a beacon of light and inspiration to the youth in his community. After college, Dre'Shon aspires to be an attorney and politician and hopes to one day give back to his community.
278	"Episode 278"	March 19, 2024	Melissa Rauch, Joey Fatone, AJ McLean
Melissa Rauch discusses Night Court. Joey Fatone & AJ McLean promote their A Legendary Night Tour.
279	"Episode 279"	March 20, 2024	Sara Bareilles, Busy Philipps, Paula Pell, Renée Elise Goldsberry, Nathalie Emmanuel
Sara Bareilles, Busy Philipps, Paula Pell, and Renée Elise Goldsberry discuss the new season of Girls5Eva. Nathalie Emmanuel promotes Arthur The King.
280	"Episode 280"	March 21, 2024	Toni Braxton, Cedric the Entertainer, Melissa Benoist, Carla Gugino, Natasha Behnam, Christina Elmore
Toni Braxton & Cedric the Entertainer promote their Las Vegas residency Love & Laughter. Melissa Benoist, Carla Gugino, Natasha Behnam, and Christina Elmore discuss drama series The Girls on The Bus.
281	"Episode 281"	March 22, 2024	Phil Keoghan, Lisa Rinna
Phil Keoghan discusses The Amazing Race. Lisa Rinna stops by.
282	"Episode 282"	March 25, 2024	Alison Brie
Alison Brie discusses her new Peacock series Apples Never Fall. Jennifer welcomes 4-year-old Leila Danai and her mother, Mildred Munjanganja, from Pompano Beach, FL, who went viral for telling her mom about how she stood up to a classmate who told her he didn't like her hairstyle. In the clip, Leila recalls the interaction: "(He said), 'I don't like that hair — it's crazy'. And I said, 'My mommy made it. And if you don't like it, I'll keep it for myself." Mildred and Leila will chat with Jennifer about their story and about the importance of instilling self-confidence at home. Jennifer welcomes Shaniece Jones from Los Angeles, CA, who is a pro closet organizer and declutter expert known as the "closet therapist" by her clients.
283	"Episode 283"	March 26, 2024	Jerrod Carmichael
Jerrod Carmichael promotes his HBO series Jerrod Carmichael Reality Show. Jennifer welcomes neuroscientist and popular online content creator Emily McDonald from Fort Lauderdale, FL. While studying neuroscience, Emily found it ironic that neuroscientists knew the importance of mental health, but none of them were taking care of their minds. She decided to apply neuroscience knowledge to help rewire her brain and improve her mental health. After noticing a huge difference in her mood with small changes, she began sharing the tips.
284	"Episode 284"	March 27, 2024	Gina Rodriguez, Carla Hall
Gina Rodriguez discusses her ABC series Not Dead Yet. Carla Hall (Chasing Flavor) will perform a cooking demo. Jennifer welcomes Jenn Drummond from Park City, UT, a mom of seven who recently made history by becoming the first woman to climb the Seven Second Summits. After recovering from a bad car accident in 2018, Jenn was inspired to climb a mountain for her 40th birthday. She began training, and eventually decided to set a world record and climb the Seven Second Summits, which she completed last summer. Jenn's new book, BreakProof, was released in January and she just returned from climbing Mount Kilimanjaro with three of her sons.
285	"Episode 285"	March 28, 2024	Kenya Barris, Jamie Kern Lima
Kenya Barris discusses his BET+ series Diarra From Detroit. Jamie Kern Lima promotes her book Worthy.
286	"Episode 286"	March 29, 2024	Jenna Dewan
Spring Celebration! Jenna Dewan promotes her ABC series The Rookie. Jennifer welcomes Kina Evans from Hayward, CA. Kina is a middle school special education teacher at Caesar Chavez Middle School and founder of Bully Talk Inc., a nonprofit organization that equips kids with tools and leadership skills to decrease bullying and create positive practices. Kina has been a teacher for 5 years and says she is motivated and inspired by her students daily. She calls her students her babies and constantly goes out of pocket to provide them with anything they need.
287	"Episode 287"	April 1, 2024	Joel McHale
Joel McHale chats about his television show Animal Control.
288	"Episode 288"	April 2, 2024	Bill Bellamy
Bill Bellamy promotes his upcoming comedy tour. Jennifer welcomes Tyara Lee from Upland, CA. Despite facing adversity as a foster youth in Compton, Tyara defied expectations and financed her education through four jobs. Overcoming instability, she credits her resilience to her faith and capacity for forgiveness. In 2018, Tyara founded She Is Foundation Network, a nonprofit aiding women with housing, employment, financial literacy, and empowerment, drawing from her own experiences. Jennifer welcomes Asjia O'Neal from Dallas, TX who made history in December as the #1 draft pick for America's first professional volleyball league, launched in 2024. Asjia gained fame for leading the Texas Longhorns to consecutive championship wins in 2022 & 2023. Despite overcoming two open-heart surgeries, she aims to secure a spot in the Paris Olympics. Asjia will teach Jennifer how to play volleyball on the show.
289	"Episode 289"	April 3, 2024	Tarek El Moussa
Tarek El Moussa discusses his television show Flip Your Life: How to Find Opportunities in Distress. Jennifer welcomes Andini Makosinski, a young inventor and Gen Z financial expert. Most recently, Andini has taken on the role of on-screen host for the second season of her show 'Your World On Money.'
290	"Episode 290"	April 4, 2024	Sara Gilbert
Sara Gilbert chats about her sitcom The Conners. Jennifer welcomes Alex George from Philadelphia, PA. Alex is a TikTok creator on a quest to make every chocolate chip cookie recipe on the internet. She is documenting her baking journey on a spreadsheet with ratings, effort, comments, and links to the recipes. Alex will teach Jennifer how to make chocolate chip cookies on the show.
291	"Episode 291"	April 5, 2024	Patton Oswalt
Patton Oswalt discusses his movie Ghostbusters: Frozen Empire. Jennifer welcomes 20-month-old Zoey Cartagena and her parents Alexis and Tony from Maplewood, NJ. A video of Zoey pointing to her skin and saying "so pretty" recently went viral. As a bi-racial couple, Alexis says it is imperative to teach her daughter the importance of loving the skin she's in. The couple gets emotional when talking about the struggles they faced expanding their family and said Zoey is their ‘miracle baby.' Alexis and Tony said the viral video is a reminder of the importance of pouring into young girls, and the love and positivity surrounding the video means the world to them. Jennifer welcomes John Dennis from Philadelphia, PA. John is a basketball coach and the founder of All Stars, a youth basketball league in Philly, where he coaches and mentors kids ages 5-14. After witnessing the challenges facing children in his city, John initiated the league to provide a safe haven, keeping youth away from the streets and trouble. John considers the kids in his program family, and serves as a father figure to many. Drawing from his own story of perseverance and redemption, John often reminds the children that they can overcome any adversity.
292	"Episode 292"	April 8, 2024	Quinta Brunson, Tabitha Brown
Abbott Elementary creator and star Quinta Brunson stops by to kick off Abbott Elementary Week on The Jennifer Hudson Show. Author and social media personality Tabitha Brown joins us to discuss her book I Did a Thing: 30 Days to Living Free. Jennifer then welcomes Deanna Dixon, a single mom and full-time rideshare driver from Atlanta, Georgia. Known as the "RideShare Queen" on social media, Deanna's viral videos, which combine carpool karaoke, cab confessions, and life talk, have amassed over 20 million views. Her goal is to make sure passengers leave feeling better than when they arrived.
293	"Episode 293"	April 9, 2024	Tyler James Williams, Dorian Missick
Tyler James Williams from Abbott Elementary stops by. Dorian Missick stops by to talk about his new film, Shirley, a biopic about trailblazing politician Shirley Chisholm. Jennifer welcomes Ford McLiney from Kansas City, Missouri, a high-level athlete who has found solace in diving amid struggles with his sexuality. Encouraged by an online friendship with openly gay swimmer Ryan Dafforn, Ford now works as a recruiter and diving coach, aiming to support other athletes.
294	"Episode 294"	April 10, 2024	Janelle James, William Stanford Davis
Janelle James and William Stanford Davis from Abbott Elementary stop by the studio. Jennifer then welcomes Bryan Ross from Beaumont, California, a P.E. teacher and coach at Ánimo Venice Charter High School. His wife, Janet, wrote to celebrate Bryan's dedication to mentoring and coaching students in a Title 1 school. As a Watts neighborhood native, Bryan is driven by the area's challenges to give back through education, offering life experiences to bridge the gap for underserved communities.
295	"Episode 295"	April 11, 2024	Sheryl Lee Ralph, Chris Perfetti
Abbott Elementary stars Sheryl Lee Ralph and Chris Perfetti visit the show. Jennifer then welcomes Scripps National Spelling Bee winner Dev Shah from Largo, Florida. Next, Anthony Sanchez from Fort Worth, Texas, stops by to chat with Jennifer. Anthony was paralyzed in a motorcycle accident seven months before the birth of his daughter Mia. Anthony believes his daughter's birth turned his life around. Dubbed "Wheelchair Papi", he's become a social media sensation, raising awareness for the wheelchair community, offering support, and inspiring others to thrive despite challenges.
296	"Episode 296"	April 12, 2024	Lisa Ann Walter, Chef Kwame
Lisa Ann Walter from Abbott Elementary stops by. Chef Kwame joins Jennifer in a cooking demo. Jennifer welcomes 17-year-old Dr. Dorothy Tillman from Chicago, Illinois, who recently made headlines for earning her Ph.D. in Integrated Behavioral Health from Arizona State University. Dr. Tillman's educational journey includes earning her associate degree at age 10, her bachelor's degree at age 12, and her master's degree by age 14. In 2020, she founded the DorothyJeanius STEAM Leadership Institute for Kids in Chicago's Bronzeville neighborhood. Despite her impressive accomplishments, she considers herself an average teenager and is currently preparing for prom.
297	"Episode 297"	April 15, 2024	Nikki Garcia, Brie Garcia, Jason Tartick
Nikki and Brie Garcia from The Nikki & Brie Show join us in studio. The Bachelor alum, author, and financial expert Jason Tartick discusses his book Talk Money to Me.
298	"Episode 298"	April 16, 2024	Iain Armitage, Montana Jordan, Raegan Revord, Lance Barber, Zoe Perry, Annie Potts, Emily Osment
Iain Armitage, Montana Jordan, Raegan Revord, Lance Barber, Zoe Perry, Annie Potts, and Emily Osment from Young Sheldon stop by for a visit. Jennifer also welcomes Linda Piston, a child science prodigy from Gainesville, Virginia. At 11 years old, she likens her school life to the TV show Young Sheldon. Piston founded Linda's Lab, a nonprofit focused on two goals: ending world hunger and improving science education. She was recently named the national STEM champion for her research on mealworms, showing they can digest Styrofoam and complete their life cycle.
299	"Episode 299"	April 17, 2024	J. Luke Wood, Sheryl Crow, Sabrina Elba
Singer Sheryl Crow chats with Jennifer about her new album, Evolution. Sabrina Elba from S'ABLE Labs Skincare also stops by. Jennifer then welcomes Dr. Luke Wood of Sacramento, California. Last July, he became permanent president of Sacramento State, the youngest among all the nation's public four-year colleges and universities. Despite facing adversity, including being born while his biological mother was incarcerated, growing up in foster care, and facing housing and food insecurities, Dr. Wood graduated from college, crediting Sac State's support. Now, he aims to boost graduation rates for former foster youth, launching the Black Honors College initiative.
300	"Episode 300"	April 18, 2024	Rita Moreno, Val Chmerkovskiy, Maks Chmerkovskiy, Scott Hamilton
As part of our Legend Series, Rita Moreno joins Jennifer to talk about her film The Prank. Dancers and brothers Val and Maks Chmerkovskiy visit. Olympic gold medalist Scott Hamilton discusses the Scott Hamilton CARES Foundation (ScottCares.org), which funds innovative cancer research.
301	"Episode 301"	April 19, 2024	Ego Nwodim
Saturday Night Live actor Ego Nwodim stops by. Jennifer welcomes Dakota Patton, a 6-year-old makeup artist from Savannah, Georgia. Known for her remarkable talent in special effects makeup, Dakota has garnered widespread attention online. Her journey into the world of makeup began at the age of 3, and her favorite canvas is her younger sister, Dylan. Dakota is the youngest person to conduct a live demonstration at the International Make-Up Artists Trade Show. Jennifer also welcomes Kelli Ritschel Boehle from Rockford, Illinois. In 2010, Kelli's youngest son, Nik, was diagnosed with cancer just before his 18th birthday. Nik was granted a wish from the Make-A-Wish Foundation. When Nik discovered that individuals over 17 do not qualify for wishes, he was determined to change that. The night before he died in 2012, Nik asked his mother to help, and The Nikolas Ritschel Foundation — also known as Nik's Wish, a 501(c)(3) nonprofit — was born. Over the past decade, Kelli has been fulfilling her son's dying wish by assisting hundreds of young adults battling cancer in realizing their dreams.
302	"Episode 302"	April 22, 2024	George Lopez, Golda Rosheuvel
Lopez vs. Lopez star George Lopez joins Jennifer in the studio. Golda Rosheuvel, Bridgerton's Queen Charlotte, stops by. Jennifer welcomes Jack Dalton of Manchester, New Hampshire. Jack, an eighth-grade student, animal activist, public speaker, author, and educational YouTuber, is known as the "Kid Conservationist" for his dedicated work in orangutan conservation. In 2022, he won the President's Environmental Youth Award and was a Top 20 finalist for the 2020 TIME Kid of the Year. Passionate about environmental preservation, Jack advocates for treating every day as Earth Day. He aspires to inspire both children and adults to adopt a more eco-conscious lifestyle.
303	"Episode 303"	April 23, 2024	Giancarlo Esposito
Giancarlo Esposito stops by to discuss his two new series, Parish and The Gentlemen.
304	"Episode 304"	April 24, 2024	Elisabeth Moss
Elisabeth Moss visits the show to talk about her new spy thriller series, The Veil. Jennifer welcomes Ossiereen "Ms. Ojay" Jones of Lawrenceville, Georgia. Ms. Ojay reached out to share her journey as a Black small business owner. At the onset of the pandemic, she noticed a void in her community — the absence of a Christian bookstore and a secure gathering spot for locals. In response, she established Rejoice Christian Bookstore in 2021. Despite encountering challenges, Ms. Ojay finds solace in the knowledge that she's positively impacting lives. Jennifer chats with professional grocery store taste-tester Jordan Myrick of Los Angeles, California. Jordan and her colleagues specialize in researching and taste-testing grocery store items nationwide. Their evaluations consider factors such as taste, price, and accessibility to rank products effectively. Jordan showcases some of the top-rated products she has sampled and guides Jennifer through a tasting experience.
305	"Episode 305"	April 25, 2024	Jesse Tyler Ferguson, Milla Jovovich
Jesse Tyler Ferguson, host of the podcast Dinner's On Me with Jesse Tyler Ferguson, stops by the studio. Milla Jovovich chats with Jennifer about co-starring together in the new action thriller movie Breathe. Jennifer welcomes Russ, Melody, Taysia, and Rylan Stein ofLos Angeles, the founders of pi00a, an Asian-, deaf-, and CODA-owned pizza restaurant. Melody, the mom, is deaf and had trouble finding work in the culinary space. Seeing the need for change, her family opened pi00a and only employ deaf workers. Their business aims to shift perceptions about deaf employees and facilitate greater job opportunities for them in the culinary field.
306	"Episode 306"	April 26, 2024	Zendaya
Zendaya drops by to chat about playing a tennis coach in her new feature film, Challengers. Jennifer welcomes Angelica May and Imeek Watkins from Wilmington, North Carolina, who recently gained attention following a viral video capturing Imeek's proposal to Angelica after she completed her final cancer treatment surrounded by family, friends, and their community. High school sweethearts, Angelica and Imeek recently celebrated their 10-year anniversary. Although Angelica's diagnosis of stage 2 triple-negative breast cancer last year was a difficult journey, the couple is now celebrating Angelica being cancer-free.
307	"Episode 307"	April 29, 2024	Mike Epps
Mike Epps from The Upshaws stops by. Jennifer then welcomes Jonna Mendez of Reston, Virginia, a former CIA chief of disguise often likened to "Q" from the James Bond novels. Jonna served in the CIA from 1966 to 1993, mastering clandestine photography and disguises in some of the world's most perilous cities and earning the CIA's Intelligence Commendation Medal. Her memoir, In True Face, released this month, recounts her career as a female operations officer in the CIA. Jonna is now an author, lecturer, and consultant on intelligence matters.
308	"Episode 308"	April 30, 2024	Kim Raver, Caterina Scorsone, Camilla Luddington
Grey's Anatomy stars Kim Raver, Caterina Scorsone, and Camilla Luddington visit the show. Next, siblings Biko, Manna, and Mfundo Nhlangothi from the viral musical group Biko's Manna stop by. Jennifer then welcomes Joy Lindsay from Gary, Indiana. Joy is the founder and CEO of Butterfly Dreamz, a 501(c)(3) nonprofit focused on mentoring girls from underserved communities to become leaders and achieve their goals. Established in 2012 after her sister Kimberly died from gun violence, the organization honors Kimberly's life and belief in the potential of women and girls. Many Butterfly Dreamz mentees go on to be first-generation college graduates and community leaders. Joy is currently pursuing her master's degree at the Harvard Graduate School of Education.
309	"Episode 309"	May 1, 2024	Cher
Jennifer interviews Grammy Award-winning Cher! Next, Jennifer welcomes the Snelson family from McKinney, Texas. Ashley and her husband Theron are huge fans of Jennifer's and wrote to the show hoping to win a fun vacation for their family. Together since eighth grade, the couple has five children: Kenedi, Tre, Chase, Creed, and Zoe. Five years ago, they opened a "microschool" and a nonprofit to help kids and families in their community. They love to spend time together as a family and go above and beyond giving back.
310	"Episode 310"	May 2, 2024	Reba McEntire
Country music singer and The Voice coach Reba McEntire is in the house! Ray and Eilyn Jimenez from HGTV's Divided by Design also join Jennifer in the studio. Next, Jennifer welcomes Vincent Palmer from Dayton, Ohio, a 3-year-old presidential expert who can recite the names and order of service of each U.S. president. His fascination began with a president-themed book he received as a birthday gift, which quickly became his prized possession. Vincent is also an avid sports fan, cheering for the Cincinnati Reds and the University of Dayton Flyers basketball team. Vincent dreams of either becoming the president or a sports announcer for the Flyers. Jennifer also welcomes Dr. Mahalia Hines, who is promoting her new book, Tomorrow's Children: How to Raise Children to Stay Human in a High-Tech Society.
311	"Episode 311"	May 3, 2024	Hannah Waddingham
Hannah Waddingham stops by to chat about The Fall Guy and The Garfield Movie. Jennifer then welcomes Kay Cox of Houston, Texas, a kid golfer who recently went viral for hitting her first hole-in-one — a feat with odds of 1 in 12,500 for adults. She took up golf in 2020 after being inspired by an LPGA Tour commercial and has quickly risen to prominence in the sport. Kay was even among 12 girls invited to the U.S. Women's Open. Jennifer also chats with Larry Farrish Jr. of Louisville, Kentucky, a school bus driver who loves his job. He currently serves nine public schools and says the students are like his children. Last month, a story of Larry buying PJs for a student who didn't have them for Pajama Day went viral. Larry regularly goes above and beyond for the kids, buying them clothes, shoes, backpacks, and food, and being a friend to them. He says the children face a lot when they are not in his care, so he does whatever he can to lend a helping hand.
312	"Episode 312"	May 6, 2024	Meghan Trainor
Singer Meghan Trainor stops by to chat about her new album, Timeless. Jennifer also welcomes Nexstar's Remarkable Women to the show.
313	"Episode 313"	May 7, 2024	Hannah Einbinder, Paul W. Downs
Hannah Einbinder and Paul W. Downs from Hacks visit the studio. Jennifer then welcomes Mark Raymond Jr. from New Orleans, Louisiana. Mark is the founder and CEO of The Split Second Foundation, a 501(c)(3) nonprofit organization and the first adaptive gym in Louisiana. The foundation is dedicated to helping individuals with disabling conditions transition from inpatient rehabilitation back into society, with a focus on mental health support. Inspired by his own experience after a shallow diving accident in 2016, which resulted in a broken neck and paralysis, Mark opened the gym in 2021. To date, Mark has supported hundreds of families, who say his foundation is "life-changing".
314	"Episode 314"	May 8, 2024	Kerry Washington, Delroy Lindo, Faly Rakotohavana, Jee Young Han, Marque Richardson, Jordyn McIntosh, CeCe Winans
The cast of UnPrisoned — Kerry Washington, Delroy Lindo, Faly Rakotohavana, Jee Young Han, Marque Richardson and Jordyn McIntosh — are in the studio! Gospel legend CeCe Winans also stops by to talk about her newest album, More Than This. Jennifer then welcomes public speaker and middle school substitute teacher Cindy Noir from Atlanta, Georgia. Last year, Cindy shared a TikTok about how UnPrisoned impacted her personal healing journey. Describing the show as a "whole therapy session", she revealed that the storyline helped her reconcile with her then-estranged father by seeing herself in Kerry Washington's character and gaining empathy for her father through Delroy Lindo's role. Jennifer then visits mom of three, Cricut expert, and content creator Joy Green from Houston, Texas.
315	"Episode 315"	May 9, 2024	Sherri Shepherd
Sherri Shepherd, star of Sherri, is in the studio. Jennifer then welcomes Autumn Goodman, a teacher from Rolling Hills Elementary in Orlando, Florida. Autumn has garnered 5.7 million likes on TikTok, frequently going viral for her Day in the Life of an Art Teacher vlogs. She works with many students from challenging home environments and believes that art serves as an equalizer, opening up entirely new worlds for them. Despite the challenges of limited funding and the high cost of art supplies, Autumn often pays out of pocket to provide for her classroom.
316	"Episode 316"	May 10, 2024	Valerie Bertinelli, Tara Lipinski
Actress and best-selling author Valerie Bertinelli visits to discuss her new cookbook, Indulge: Delicious and Decadent Dishes to Enjoy and Share. Olympic figure skater, actress, and TV commentator Tara Lipinski also stops by. Jennifer welcomes NICU nurses Taylor and Drew Deras from Omaha, Nebraska, to the show. The married couple recently made headlines by adopting 3-year-old Ella, a patient they cared for at work as her primary nurses. Born prematurely in May 2021, Ella faced numerous health challenges. When Ella became a ward of the state in December 2021, the couple stepped in as her foster parents, eventually adopting her in November 2023. Now a happy and thriving toddler, Ella has overcome significant health issues. Taylor and Drew describe their unexpected journey to parenthood as the greatest joy of their lives.
317	"Episode 317"	May 13, 2024	Jurnee Smollett, Bre-Z, Daniel Ezra, Greta Onieogou, Michael Evans Behling, Monet Mazur, Samantha Logan
Jurnee Smollett, the star of We Grown Now, stops by the studio. Next, Jennifer welcomes the cast of All American — Bre-Z, Daniel Ezra, Greta Onieogou, Michael Evans Behling, Monet Mazur, and Samantha Logan. Jennifer also chats with Brittany Love from Los Angeles, California. Brittany is an artist and DJ who happens to be obsessed with the show All American.
318	"Episode 318"	May 14, 2024	Chris Stapleton
Chris Stapleton is in the house to talk about his new album, Higher, and his upcoming All-American Road Show tour. Jennifer also welcomes etiquette expert Myka Meier from New York, New York.
319	"Episode 319"	May 15, 2024	Wanda Sykes
Wanda Sykes from The Upshaws discusses her Please & Thank You comedy tour. Jennifer then welcomes father and daughter Chris Locke from Newark, Delaware, and Kat Locke-Jones, 33, from Baltimore, Maryland. Together, they founded the Sean Locke Foundation in 2018 after losing their son/brother Sean Locke to suicide. The foundation provides mental health resources for kids in high school all the way through college. They also have Sean's House, a home that provides in-person support 24/7 for young adults to talk about mental health or substance use challenges with other young adult peer specialists who have lived experience with similar challenges.
320	"Episode 320"	May 16, 2024	Dulé Hill
Dulé Hill visits to discuss his PBS documentary series The Express Way with Dulé Hill. Jennifer highlights the national tour of MJ the Musical. Jennifer then warmly welcomes identical twin sisters Cherry and Sherry Wilmore from Houma, Louisiana. Fondly dubbed "everybody's favorite twins" by their community, Cherry and Sherry are known for their compassionate hearts and vibrant personalities. Placed in foster care at age 6, they have weathered numerous challenges but have always relied on their unbreakable bond to navigate difficult times together. Last year, they established the nonprofit organization CHeriSH Times Two — a blend of their names — to empower and support foster youth.
321	"Episode 321"	May 17, 2024	Wiz Khalifa
Rapper and singer Wiz Khalifa stops by to chat with Jennifer.
322	"Episode 322"	May 20, 2024	Tyler Cameron
Former star of The Bachelorette Tyler Cameron stops by to discuss his new house renovation series, Going Home with Tyler Cameron. Jennifer then welcomes viral father-and-daughter duo Jay and Tatum Galberth from Washington, D.C. Jay is the founder of Dads Do It Too, which promotes positivity about fatherhood and spotlights dads online. The pair first went viral in February after posting a video of themselves singing to Muni Long's "Made for Me", earning attention from celebrities like Michelle Obama, Will Smith, and Mary J. Blige.
323	"Episode 323"	May 21, 2024	Fat Joe, Le Sserafim
Rapper Fat Joe visits the studio and chats about Rewind It 10 hair color for men. South Korean girl group Le Sserafim — Sakura, Kim Chae-won, Huh Yun-jin, Kazuha, and Hong Eun-chae — are here with their hit "Smart".
324	"Episode 324"	May 22, 2024	Diane Lane
Diane Lane, star of A Man in Full and Feud: Capote vs. The Swans, stops by. Jennifer also welcomes fourth-grade teacher Marcus Bornslater, aka "Mr. B," from Dallas, Texas. The José "Joe" May Elementary School teacher often goes viral on Instagram and TikTok for his good looks and fashion sense, and he has become very popular among the students, staff, and community. Many of his students face tough lives, including homelessness and broken homes. Recognizing the need for a positive role model, Marcus created a safe space for his students. He keeps his classroom stocked with snacks, deodorant, and hygiene products. For Christmas, Marcus bought each student an item from their wish lists.
325	"Episode 325"	May 23, 2024	Shonda Rhimes, Élodie Yung
The incomparable Shonda Rhimes is in the studio as Season 3 of the wildly popular Bridgerton kicks off. The Cleaning Lady star Élodie Yung chats about her drama series. Jennifer then welcomes The 50 documentary director Brenton Gieser, retired correctional officer Sol Irving, and The 50 member Cameron Clark. The 50 explores the stories of 50 men serving life sentences in a dangerously overcrowded and drug-saturated prison in California. The men took part in the groundbreaking Offender Mentor Certificate Program and became the first incarcerated substance abuse counselors in the country. The group radically transformed the culture of their prison system, and many have been paroled and are now creating change in their communities and beyond.
326	"Episode 326"	May 24, 2024	Ernie Hudson
Ernie Hudson is in the studio to chat with Jennifer about his TV show The Family Business.
327	"Episode 327"	May 28, 2024	Jay Pharoah, Tanner Adell
Comedian and actor Jay Pharoah is in the studio to talk about hosting his new game show, The Quiz with Balls. Country singer (and Beyoncé collaborator) Tanner Adell stops by to chat about "Whiskey Blues".
328	"Episode 328"	May 29, 2024	Mindy Kaling, Cameron Brink, Dearica Hamby, Lexie Brown, Rickea Jackson
Mindy Kaling sits down with Jennifer to discuss skin care line Lion Pose. Next, Jennifer visits with Cameron Brink, Dearica Hamby, Lexie Brown, and Rickea Jackson from the Los Angeles Sparks basketball team.
329	"Episode 329"	May 30, 2024	Pam Grier
Pam Grier stops by to talk about Season 2 of her TV series Them: The Scare. Jennifer then chats with second-grader Bailey Butts and first-graders Ashton Tyler and Bella Baker of Los Angeles, California, for a "Words from the Wise: Kids Edition" segment. Next, Jennifer welcomes award-winning chef Keith Corbin from Los Angeles. Prior to owning Alta Adams restaurant, Keith faced many challenges. He was raised in Watts and was in and out of prison for 10-plus years before he decided to change the trajectory of his life. Since his release in 2014, Keith has obtained a certificate of rehabilitation from Los Angeles County and uses his experience to give back to others. Keith only hires staff who wouldn't be given a chance anywhere else and says his restaurant is a place for community.
330	"Episode 330"	May 31, 2024	Sarah Jakes Roberts
Bestselling author Sarah Jakes Roberts is here to talk about her book Power Moves: Igniting Your Confidence and Becoming a Force.
331	"Episode 331"	June 3, 2024	Ben Platt, Malika Andrews
Actor and singer Ben Platt stops by to talk about his third album, Honeymind. Malika Andrews from ESPN's NBA Today and NBA Countdown also visits. Jennifer then chats with kid surfer AJ Iredell from Carlsbad, California. AJ, a regional champion who has been surfing since he was 3 years old, is a beloved member of the local surf community. He's also passionate about teaching others about the sport. Every year, he volunteers with the nonprofit Waves of Impact, which offers free surf camps for kids in need. Several of the campers come back annually to see AJ and say it's the best part of their year. Jennifer also welcomes back cancer survivor Phyllis Wright and her daughter, Imanni, from Bloomfield Hills, Michigan, as they share an update on their lives.
332	"Episode 332"	June 4, 2024	Morris Chestnut, Kathy Swarts, Susan Noles
The talented Morris Chestnut discusses his TV series Diarra from Detroit. Next, The Golden Bachelor alums and Golden Hour podcast hosts Kathy Swarts and Susan Noles are in the studio.
333	"Episode 333"	June 5, 2024	Glen Powell, Carl Clemons-Hopkins
Glen Powell is here to chat about his new noir comedy film Hit Man. Next, Hacks star Carl Clemons-Hopkins stops by to talk about the hit series. Jennifer then welcomes stand-up comedian Jon Laster from Brooklyn, New York, who founded Blapp — the Black Shopping App.
334	"Episode 334"	June 6, 2024	Shay Mitchell, Ray Jimenez, Eilyn Jimenez
Shay Mitchell visits to discuss her MAX series Thirst with Shay Mitchell, where she explores drinks from around the world. Divided by Design stars Ray and Eilyn Jimenez also stop by.
335	"Episode 335"	June 7, 2024	Ron Funches
The Ron Funches is here to talk about his TV series Loot. Jennifer then welcomes Akayla Joseph from Houston, Texas, who teaches first grade at Winship Elementary, a Title I school where 100% of the students receive free breakfast and lunch. Akayla loves her students like family, attends every event and birthday party, and regularly goes out of pocket for them. Outside of helping with basic necessities, her favorite items to give her students are books. Since the pandemic, Akayla has been taking her students on virtual field trips and posts their adventures online. She also leads daily affirmations with her class and says the most important takeaway from her classroom is to "be kind".
336	"Episode 336"	June 10, 2024	Marla Gibbs
Marla Gibbs, of The Jeffersons and 227, stops by to chat about her new role in the series Not Dead Yet. Jennifer then welcomes engaged couple Samuel Evans and Tateona Adams from Chicago, Illinois. Together, Samuel and Tateona have a blended family of five sons: Devan, Tristan, Demari, Carter, and Josiah. Samuel grew up with two brothers in a rough neighborhood in Chicago. He decided to break the cycle with his own children, teaching them love and respect toward one's family is above all else. Each morning, the boys do a group hug before their youngest brother gets on the school bus. They also make videos to wish a great day to their followers online to spread love and positivity.
337	"Episode 337"	June 11, 2024	Retta
Retta visits the show to discuss her new movie, Hit Man.
338	"Episode 338"	June 12, 2024	Mickey Guyton, Scotty McCreery
Country music singer Mickey Guyton is in the studio with her new single "Make It Me". American Idol winner and fellow country crooner Scotty McCreery also stops by to chat about his new album, Rise & Fall. Then, floral designer Kristen Griffith-VanderYacht is here to talk about his new book, Flower Love: Lush Floral Arrangements for the Heart and Home.
339	"Episode 339"	June 13, 2024	Alex Rodriguez, Gerry Turner
Retired Major League Baseball player Alex Rodriguez is here to talk about owning the Minnesota Timberwolves and Lynx, plus why he's teaming up with OraPharma. The Golden Bachelor Gerry Turner also stops by. Jennifer then welcomes actor and content creator Ulysses "Uly" Morazan, who recently posted a video explaining football for Taylor Swift fans to learn the sport. Ulysses will chat with Jennifer about his findings.
340	"Episode 340"	June 14, 2024	Ms. Pat
Ms. Pat from Ms. Pat Settles It is here to talk about her comedy tour Ya Girl Done Made It. Jennifer then welcomes viral dancer 6-year-old Salomé Rivas ("Baby Salo") from Miami, Florida, who is known for her videos dancing to Latin music, especially reggaeton. Several of the biggest Latin music stars have reposted Salomé, who is originally from Venezuela, including Karol G. Jennifer also welcomes professor and The Princess Within Foundation founder Dr. Bernada Baker, and her 6-year-old daughter Bella Baker, from Houston, Texas. In 2017, Bernada moved to the Houston area from Chicago, and then Hurricane Harvey hit. Bernada helped with recovery efforts and raised money for a displaced dad and his baby daughter, Bella. She saw Bella's dad needed support and her father recognized he couldn't provide Bella the life she deserved. Bernada offered to adopt her and says adopting Bella has changed her life in the best way possible.

=== Season 3 (2024–2025) ===
No.	Title	Original release date	Guest(s)
341	"Season 3 Premiere"	September 16, 2024	Angela Bassett
Angela Bassett of 9-1-1 stops by. Next, the MUSYCA Youth Choir of Los Angeles, California, performs in-studio. Jennifer then welcomes Sherllay Debe Petion from Cape Coral, Florida, who gave birth to her daughter, Bithiah, at 35 weeks in the back seat of a rideshare. With her husband away, Sherllay called a rideshare to get to the hospital but went into labor en route. The driver pulled over, and Bithiah was born under a Miami highway during rush hour. Sherllay wrote in to thank the two female officers who helped her that day.
342	"Episode 342"	September 17, 2024	Marlon Wayans
Marlon Wayans joins Jennifer in the studio to discuss his "Wild Child" comedy tour and more. Jennifer then welcomes 5-year-old drill team captain Kenzley Reign of Sophisticated Sounds & Steppers Drill Team & Drum Squad from Los Angeles, California. Director Brandon Glasco's mother founded the organization in 2004 as a way to give back to the community and offer kids in South L.A. something fun to look forward to. Because the team has limited resources, Brandon and the trainers regularly go out of pocket to provide the kids with anything they need to participate. The squad currently has about 60 members and Brandon says they are all like family. Next, the 8-year-old "Green Twins," Marnie and Mylah Green, join Jennifer. These adorable kids from Burnley, England, are famous for finishing each other's sentences. Over the summer, they became internet sensations when their hilarious reaction to the price of two ice creams (£9) went viral. The sisters are enjoying their newfound fame and dream of opening an ice cream shop where kids eat for free and adults pay affordable prices. In addition to their viral stardom, they're also competitive dancers who have won multiple European championships.
343	"Episode 343"	September 18, 2024	Leslie Jones
Leslie Jones stops by to talk about her comedy tour. Jennifer welcomes 6-year-old Alaya Armbrister from Broward County, Florida. Alaya won the 400 meters gold at the 2024 AAU Nationals, making her the fastest 6-year-old in the country. Her viral race videos have been shared by ESPN SportsCenter celebrities, and even Olympic athletes. Fans already line up for photos with her at meets. Her dad and coach, DeAndre, noticed her talent at age 3, and Alaya dreams of competing in the Olympics one day.
344	"Episode 344"	September 19, 2024	Dave Bautista
Dave Bautista visits to chat about his new action-comedy film, "The Killer's Game." Jennifer also welcomes Ralmon McAfee and his 11-year-old daughter, Ma'Kynzeigh, from Houston, Texas. Ralmon made headlines after sharing an emotional video of himself crying tears of pride over his daughter's academic achievements. Overcome with emotion as he watched Ma'Kynzeigh accept her awards, Ralmon explained that his own struggles in school and early diagnosis of learning disabilities made the moment especially meaningful. By sharing his video, Ralmon hopes to break the stigma surrounding men showing their emotions, proving that vulnerability is a sign of strength, not weakness. Next, professional makeup artist Abby Wren from Los Angeles talks to Jennifer about how she turned her alopecia diagnosis at 15 into a powerful advocacy. Abby used to hide her condition but now fully embraces her bald look, using makeup, fashion, and her motto "Different Is Dope" to inspire others with alopecia. Through live events, meet-and-greets, and online tutorials, she empowers others to celebrate their uniqueness. Abby recently went viral after encouraging a 10-year-old girl to reveal her bald head in public for the first time, becoming the role model she wished she had growing up.
345	"Episode 345"	September 20, 2024	Demi Moore
Demi Moore joins the studio to chat about her new critically acclaimed film, "The Substance." Jennifer then welcomes Terrica Williams and her son, 9-year-old Czar Glanton Jr., from Polk County, Florida. A heartwarming video of Terrica running football drills with her son after work has gone viral. Four years ago, when Czar first started playing football, Terrica noticed he wasn't getting picked for games. Determined to help him improve, she took matters into her own hands. Despite a demanding schedule as a full-time single parent working at a nursing facility, Terrica taught herself the game and began running extra practices with Czar. Now, this special time they share is not only helping him thrive but also bringing joy to people everywhere and inspiring moms across the country.
346	"Episode 346"	September 23, 2024	Rob Lowe
Rob Lowe from "9-1-1: Lone Star" and "The Floor" stops by. Jennifer then welcomes Zalah Vallien, a student from Norwalk Conservatory of the Arts in Norwalk, Connecticut, whose viral video singing the national anthem in her school's cafeteria earned her the nickname "powerhouse." Zalah opens up about Jennifer's influence on her life and how meeting her is a dream come true. Originally from central Louisiana, Zalah only sees her family once or twice a year. Raised by her young single mom and pastor grandmother, she shares a close bond with her younger sister, whom she calls her "baby," and is her biggest fan.
347	"Episode 347"	September 24, 2024	Terrence Howard
Terrence Howard drops by to chat about his new miniseries, "Fight Night: The Million Dollar Heist." Next, the 8-year-old "Green Twins," Marnie and Mylah Green, join Jennifer. These adorable kids from Burnley, England, are famous for finishing each other's sentences. Over the summer, they became internet sensations when their hilarious reaction to the price of two ice creams (£9) went viral. The sisters are enjoying their newfound fame and dream of opening an ice cream shop where kids eat for free and adults pay affordable prices. In addition to their viral stardom, they're also competitive dancers who have won multiple European championships.
348	"Episode 348"	September 25, 2024	Sterling K. Brown, Ryan Michelle Bathe, Violet McGraw, Madeleine McGraw
Power couple Sterling K. Brown and Ryan Michelle Bathe discuss their podcast "We Don't Always Agree." "The Curse of the Necklace" stars Violet McGraw and Madeleine McGraw chat with Jennifer about their film.
349	"Episode 349"	September 26, 2024	Flavor Flav
Flavor Flav joins Jennifer in the studio. Jennifer then welcomes Terrica Williams and her son, 9-year-old Czar Glanton Jr., from Polk County, Florida. A heartwarming video of Terrica running football drills with her son after work has gone viral. Four years ago, when Czar first started playing football, Terrica noticed he wasn't getting picked for games. Determined to help him improve, she took matters into her own hands. Despite a demanding schedule as a full-time single parent working at a nursing facility, Terrica taught herself the game and began running extra practices with Czar. Now, this special time they share is not only helping him thrive but also bringing joy to people everywhere and inspiring moms across the country.
350	"Episode 350"	September 27, 2024	Saweetie
Saweetie is here! Jennifer also welcomes 2-year-old math prodigy Devan Defreitas and his father, Duane, from Queens, New York. Devan became a viral sensation at 15 months for his math skills, with his first word being "seven." Now at age 2, he's solving sixth-grade math problems and memorizing over 160 digits of pi.
351	"Episode 351"	September 30, 2024	Alfonso Ribeiro
Alfonso Ribeiro from "Dancing with the Stars" and "America's Funniest Home Videos" is here. Jennifer then welcomes Stephany Faublas and her daughter, Cadence, from Charlotte, South Carolina, whose viral video has millions of views. Stephany, a single mom, replaced Cadence's iPad with educational activities before kindergarten and was surprised by her daughter's positive reaction. Cadence now feels ready for school and dreams of getting a "good job" to buy a dog and her dream car.
352	"Episode 352"	October 1, 2024	Doug Emhoff
Second Gentleman Doug Emhoff sits down with Jennifer in the studio. Next, Jennifer welcomes Angel Everett and her mother, Dorothy Johnson, from Montgomery, Alabama, to share their family's breast cancer journey. Angel cared for her sister Eboni through treatment and later faced her own diagnosis, undergoing a double mastectomy. Though both were declared cancer-free, Eboni's cancer returned, and she died in July. The family now honors her memory by continuing her advocacy for early testing and establishing a scholarship in her name.
353	"Episode 353"	October 2, 2024	Gwen Stefani
Gwen Stefani visits to chat about "The Voice." Jennifer then welcomes back etiquette expert Myka Meier. "Love Island" Season 6 winners Serena Page and Kordell Beckham also stop by.
354	"Episode 354"	October 3, 2024	Common, Pete Rock
Common and Pete Rock will join Jennifer in the studio to perform their song "A GOD (There Is)" from their latest album, "The Auditorium, Vol. 1."
355	"Episode 355"	October 4, 2024	Ariana DeBose
Oscar winner and voice of Asha in Disney's Wish, Ariana DeBose is here to chat about her new film, "House of Spoils." Jennifer then welcomes Suborno Bari from the Bronx, New York, who recently made headlines as the youngest student in NYU's 200-year history. On a full-ride scholarship, Suborno is double majoring in math and physics, set to graduate in 2026, with plans to earn his Ph.D. by 2029. His ultimate goal is to become a professor by age 16 or 17. Outside of academics, Suborno enjoys gardening, badminton, and chess. Jennifer also chats with Johnny Rodriguez from Orange County, California, a former pro lacrosse player and head coach at Mater Dei High School. After leading his team to national recognition, Johnny stepped down following an ALS diagnosis last October, just as his wife was expecting their second child. Despite the diagnosis, he remains positive and advocates for ALS awareness, partnering with Augie's Quest to launch "Athletes vs. ALS." This October, he'll receive an ALS Champion Award. Johnny, who experiences fatigue and muscle weakness, inspires other patients to "win the day."
356	"Episode 356"	October 7, 2024	Jimmy Kimmel, Tems
The one and only Jimmy Kimmel from "Jimmy Kimmel Live!" stops by the show. Tems sits down for a chat and also performs "Love Me JeJe" a song from her album "Born in the Wild." Jennifer also welcomes Dr. Brian Rambarran, a urologist from Buffalo, New York, who is also a dedicated pilot. Once a month, Dr. Rambarran flies rescue missions to save animals, with a viral video of him unloading puppies garnering millions of views. For the past 12 years, he's been rescuing dogs from kill shelters and euthanasia lists in Asheville, North Carolina, and transporting them to Nickel City Canine Rescue in Buffalo. As a urological cancer surgeon, he saves lives — and he gives dogs a second chance at life, too.
357	"Episode 357"	October 8, 2024	Wayne Brady, Khalid
Let's Make a Deal host Wayne Brady and members of his blended family, including Maīle Brady, Mandie Taketa, and Jason Fordham, stop by to discuss their reality series "Wayne Brady: The Family Remix." Khalid is here to talk about his album "Sincere." Jennifer also welcomes Claire Babineaux-Fontenot, CEO of Feeding America, the nation's largest hunger-relief organization. Currently on the front lines of Hurricane Helene relief, Feeding America partners with food banks and local programs to provide food for those in need and advocates for lasting solutions to hunger.
358	"Episode 358"	October 9, 2024	Kristen Bell, Adam Brody, Justine Lupe, Timothy Simons, Jackie Tohn, Sherry Cola
Kristen Bell (the voice of Anna in Disney's Frozen), Adam Brody, Justine Lupe, Timothy Simons, Jackie Tohn, and Sherry Cola join Jennifer to chat about their Netflix series "Nobody Wants This." Jennifer also welcomes Maria Niemetz from Ontario, California, in honor of Breast Cancer Awareness Month and National Hispanic Heritage Month. Maria is an NICU nurse, grandmother, and breast cancer survivor. We'll show a heartfelt nomination video from her daughter Rosanna and former daughter-in-law Cristina, both in the audience, and invite them to join Maria onstage. To top it off, Maria's whole family, including her grandchildren, will walk out and surprise her.
359	"Episode 359"	October 10, 2024	Josh Groban
Josh Groban is here to talk about his nonprofit Find Your Light Foundation and its upcoming annual Find Your Light Benefit Concert for Arts Education. Jennifer also welcomes William "Billy" Green Jr. from Harlem, New York. A proud Puerto Rican, Black, Italian, gay, and nonbinary teacher, Billy has taught chemistry and physics for over 20 years at A. Philip Randolph, a Title I high school. Named the 2023 New York State Teacher of the Year and Grand Marshal of the Queens Pride Parade, Billy's passion for teaching, shaped by his experience with homelessness, drives him to serve underserved schools, as well as the prison on Rikers Island. He also co-leads the school's LGBTQ affinity group and founded an LGBTQ youth support center in East Harlem.
360	"Episode 360"	October 11, 2024	Tia Mowry, GloRilla
Tia Mowry stops by the studio to chat about her reality series "My Next Act." GloRilla is also here to discuss her album "Glorious."
361	"Episode 361"	October 14, 2024	Joel McHale
Actor and host Joel McHale stops by to chat about the new season of "Crime Scene Kitchen." Jennifer welcomes 12-year-old award-winning inventor Anirudh Rao from Lone Tree, CO. Anirudh will share the inspiration behind his groundbreaking invention — an early tornado detection system that extends the warning time from 15 to 45 minutes. His innovative work has earned him recognition across the STEM community.
362	"Episode 362"	October 15, 2024	Blair Underwood, Victoria Monét, Keith Bynum, Evan Thomas
Actor Blair Underwood discusses his role in the STARZ series "Three Women" R&B sensation Victoria Monét unveils the details of her highly anticipated album "JAGUAR II: Deluxe Edition." HGTV's hosts Keith & Evan stop by to chat about the new season of "HGTV's Bargain Block: New Orleans."
363	"Episode 363"	October 16, 2024	Jake Tapper, Alice Paul Tapper
CNN Host Jake Tapper drops by and will be joined by his daughter Alice Paul Tapper to discuss her new book "Use Your Voice." Plus, "Sean the Science Kid" from Lilburn, GA, is here to share his enthusiasm about teaching others about science. His viral videos have become a beloved sensation, teaching people fun science facts and answering questions.
364	"Episode 364"	October 17, 2024	Jay Pharoah, Allison Reese
Actor and comedian Jay Pharoah on the inspiration behind his upcoming YouTube comedy stand-up special. Comedian Allison Reese will perform her spot-on impression of Vice President Kamala Harris. Next, Jennifer welcomes Assistant Principal Tony Wishard from Fredericksburg, VA. Tony's journey from teacher to administrator recently went viral, as he shared heartfelt memories of his students from over the years. In his 12-year career, Tony has gone above and beyond to support his students, not only in the classroom but also in their personal lives. He's known for using his own funds to provide essentials. Tony regularly eats lunch with students, celebrates their milestones, and serves as a coach and mentor to many.
365	"The Gift of Love: Jennifer's Holiday in October Special"	October 18, 2024	Tichina Arnold, Terry Crews
Jennifer Hudson will give an exclusive debut performance from her new holiday album "The Gift of Love." Get ready for a magical musical moment that will light up your holiday season! Actors Tichina Arnold and Terry Crews join Jennifer to discuss the exciting reboot of "Everybody Still Hates Chris." Plus, Jennifer welcomes the Senters Family from Phoenix, AZ — Ryan and Sara Senters, along with their nine adopted children. Together, they will share their powerful journey of founding Ohana, a nonprofit organization dedicated to supporting foster youth in Arizona. Through Ohana, the Senters family provides life-changing opportunities, including mentorship programs, career services, and transformative experiences that help these young people thrive beyond their immediate communities.
366	"Episode 366"	October 21, 2024	Sheryl Swoopes, Derek Hough
Emmy Award-winning professional dancer and host Derek Hough swings by to chat about his upcoming dance tour, "Derek Hough Dance for the Holidays," and this season of "Dancing with the Stars." Next, former WNBA player Sheryl Swoopes sits down with Jennifer to discuss her advocacy work and personal journey with breast cancer in honor of Breast Cancer Awareness Month.
367	"Episode 367"	October 22, 2024	Lamorne Morris
Actor and comedian Lamorne Morris drops by to chat about the new film "Saturday Night." Jennifer then welcomes Josiah Johnson and his grandmother Theresa from Sacramento, California. Their rap battle videos have gone viral, attracting attention from celebrities like Timbaland, Drake, and Snoop Dogg. In their lighthearted battles, Josiah jokes about Theresa's dentures and orthopedic shoes, while she playfully brings up his knee surgery at 21. Despite the teasing, they show the love between them.
368	"Episode 368"	October 23, 2024	Morgan Freeman, Joan Vassos
Hollywood legend Morgan Freeman visits the show to talk about the second season of "Lioness." Joan Vassos makes an appearance to talk about being the first-ever lead of "The Golden Bachelorette." Plus, Jennifer welcomes 12-year-old Jack Carlin from El Paso, Texas. Over the summer, "Jack the Great" went viral for his excitement and love of watching the lights turn off. Since then, he's traveled around the country to see the lights turn off at sports games, event centers, stores, and popular destinations like the Alamo, the Vegas Strip, and the Empire State Building. Next, he'll be heading to Paris to watch the Eiffel Tower lights turn off.
369	"Episode 369"	October 24, 2024	Joel Madden
Joel Madden stops by to chat about the new season of "Ink Master."
370	"Episode 370"	October 25, 2024	Holly Robinson Peete, Rodney Peete
Hollywood power couple Holly Robinson Peete and Rodney Peete discuss their exciting hosting journey in the new season of "Queens Court." Jennifer then welcomes Madison Crowell and her mom, Melissa Langley, from Hinesville, Georgia. Madison made headlines for receiving over $15 million in scholarships and being accepted to 231 colleges, choosing a full-ride scholarship to High Point University. As a first-generation college student, she aims to inspire underprivileged youth. President Biden congratulated her, calling her a future leader.
371	"Episode 371"	October 28, 2024	Kathryn Hahn, Stephen Nedoroscik, Rylee Arnold
Actress and comedian Kathryn Hahn (the voice of Ericka in Hotel Transylvania 3: Summer Vacation and Hotel Transylvania: Transformania) stops by to chat about the new Disney+ series "Agatha All Along." Two-time Olympic bronze medalist Stephen Nedoroscik and his dance partner, Rylee Arnold, are here to chat about this exciting season of "Dancing with the Stars." Jennifer then welcomes Colette Louis and her daughter Cami from Charlotte, North Carolina, to the show. Their video went viral after Colette helped Cami prepare for her first father-daughter dance. Colette highlights the importance of instilling confidence and self-esteem in young girls, something she missed out on growing up, and aims to empower Cami and others.
372	"Episode 372"	October 29, 2024	Damon Wayans, Damon Wayans Jr., Hannah Storm
Father and son Damon Wayans and Damon Wayans Jr. from My Wife and Kids join Jennifer at the show. The actors and comedians will be chatting about the CBS show "Poppa's House." Plus, SportsCenter's Hannah Storm visits to discuss her personal journey with breast cancer in honor of Breast Cancer Awareness Month. Mother-daughter duo Kenedi and Ellen Smith from Murrieta, California, stop by to share their inspiring journey through multiple surrogacies. They're now spreading awareness and education through their podcast, "Stop. Sit. Surrogate," where they discuss the many facets of surrogacy and the invaluable experiences it offers.
373	"Episode 373"	October 30, 2024	Blair Underwood
Actor Blair Underwood drops by to chat with Jennifer about the new STARZ series "Three Women." Jennifer welcomes popular TikTok sister duo Sarah and Emily Francati from Rochester, New York. The sisters share their inspiring story about how Sarah stepped up at age 15 to help raise her younger sister Emily, who has Down syndrome, after their mom was diagnosed with Stage 3 colon cancer. Despite the challenges, Emily felt love from Sarah. They formed a close bond, which remained even after their mom's disease went into remission. Now a senior in high school and a basketball coach, Emily hopes to inspire others about the capabilities of people with Down syndrome. Plus, a beauty alert! Jennifer welcomes back professional makeup artist Abby Wren. Abby will show how you can elevate your Halloween makeup with a few simple tricks.
374	"Halloween Celebration!"	October 31, 2024	Janelle Monáe, Lance Bass
It's "The Jennifer Hudson Show" Halloween Celebration! Tune in for a special episode of spooktacular fun, featuring performances, festive costumes, and special surprises! Award-winning musician and actress and the "Queen of Halloween," Janelle Monáe, stops by to show off her amazing costume! Singer Lance Bass joins the celebration to chat about the Paramount+ documentary "Larger than Life: Reign of the Boybands."
375	"Episode 375"	November 1, 2024	Ludacris
Jennifer welcomes rapper and actor Ludacris to the show. They'll be discussing the new season of the music competition series "Rhythm + Flow."
376	"Episode 376"	November 4, 2024	Warren G, Ethan Slater
Hip-hop legend Warren G visits Jennifer's stage to celebrate the 30th anniversary of his album "Regulate…G Funk Era" and his upcoming tour. Broadway star Ethan Slater then chats with Jennifer about his magical role as Boq in the highly anticipated film "Wicked." Plus, Jennifer welcomes back 7-year-old Bella Baker from Los Angeles to ask for Bella's take on what she would do if she were president!
377	"Episode 377"	November 5, 2024	Christina Milian
Singer, songwriter, and actress Christina Milian chats with Jennifer about her new Netflix film, "Meet Me Next Christmas." Then, Jennifer Ellis and her husband Travis from Fayetteville, West Virginia, join the show and share their story of how the loss of a loved one brought them together.
378	"Episode 378"	November 6, 2024	Jason Derulo, Jamie Kern Lima
R&B sensation Jason Derulo is here is chat about his newest single, "Make Me Happy." New York Times best-selling author and entrepreneur Jamie Kern Lima stops by to share tips on ways to take care of yourself and protect your joy during Election Week. She'll also talk about her upcoming book, "Worthy."
379	"Episode 379"	November 7, 2024	Drew Scott, Jonathan Scott
HGTV's Drew and Jonathan Scott stop by to chat about their new series, "Don't Hate Your House with the Property Brothers." Plus, Jennifer welcomes Rachel Siegel, a dance instructor in Los Angeles who went viral after posting about being left at the altar and then going to her wedding reception solo to celebrate with friends and family.
380	"Episode 380"	November 8, 2024	Andrea Bocelli
Vocal legend Andrea Bocelli visits the show to talk about his upcoming concert film, "Andrea Bocelli 30: The Celebration." Tune in for a transcendent musical moment between Bocelli, Jennifer Hudson, and her pianist, Charles Jones. Jennifer also welcomes twin sisters Alex and Ashley Kern from Buffalo, New York, who share their inspiring story. In 2016, Ashley, a high school senior, was injured in a drive-by shooting that left her paralyzed from the waist down. She and Alex had planned to attend college together and pursue nursing careers as first-generation graduates. After months in the hospital and rehab, Ashley missed the chance to start college with Alex. Despite these challenges, she persevered and eventually graduated from nursing school alongside her sister.
381	"Episode 381"	November 11, 2024	Ciara
R&B sensation Ciara will discuss her new song "Wassup" ft. Busta Rhymes. Eight-year-old Hannah Strickland and her mom, Dawn, from Port St. Lucie, Florida, chat about their viral video of Hannah joyfully picking out Christmas tree ornaments. The heartwarming moment quickly gained attention online. Tune-in to see Jennifer's big surprise for Hannah! Jennifer welcomes community leader Antonio Brown from St. Petersburg, FL. Antonio, owner of Central Station Barbershop & Grooming, offers free haircuts to kids in his ‘Competitive Readers Book Club." Inspired by barbershop culture as a safe space, he started the program to improve literacy in his community. Instead of paying for the haircut, kids learn about saving and financial literacy.
382	"Episode 382"	November 12, 2024	Justin Hartley
Actor Justin Hartley joins Jennifer to talk about Season 2 of his hit series "Tracker." Jennifer welcomes Noah Wilks and his mom, Jasmine, from Redford, Michigan, to the stage. Noah recently went viral when a video captured his newfound confidence and swagger after his first day of first grade.
383	"Episode 383"	November 13, 2024	Martin Lawrence
Comedian and actor Martin Lawrence will chat about his comedy tour "Ya'll Know What It Is!" Plus, Jennifer welcomes theater teacher Alison Calder and her former student Cienna Dixon. Cienna shares how Alison made a lasting impact on her, especially during her mental health struggles. Cienna says she wouldn't be here without Alison's support, and as thank you, she got a tattoo of Alison's phrase "Always with you."
384	"Hurricane Heroes"	November 14, 2024	None
Jennifer will celebrate "Hurricane Heroes," highlighting inspiring stories of brave individuals who emerged as heroes during Hurricanes Helene and Milton. This special episode spotlights the resilience and selflessness of first responders, community leaders, and everyday citizens who came together to support one another.
385	"Episode 385"	November 15, 2024	Ken Jeong, Rita Ora, Robin Thicke, Jenny McCarthy
Jennifer sits down for an exclusive interview with the panelists of "The Masked Singer," Ken Jeong, Rita Ora, Robin Thicke, and Jenny McCarthy. Also joining Jennifer is viral kid food critic and "food taster" Reese Jackson from New Orleans, Louisiana. Reese has recently taken the Internet by storm with his reactions to his mom's elaborate home-cooked meals.
386	"Episode 386"	November 18, 2024	Jon Batiste
Multiple Grammy- and Oscar-winning artist Jon Batiste stops by to talk about his upcoming album "Beethoven Blues (Batiste Piano Series, Vol. 1)." Jennifer also welcomes 10-year-old Samuel Henderson and his mother, Lori, from Oklahoma City, Oklahoma, to the stage. Samuel recently went viral for a video his mother filmed that showcased his amazingly accurate bird calls at his school's talent show.
387	"Episode 387"	November 19, 2024	Henry Winkler, Giada De Laurentiis
Actor and author Henry Winkler will talk about his children's book "Detective Duck: The Case of the Missing Tadpole" and the paperback of his memoir "Being Henry: The Fonz…and Beyond." Giada De Laurentiis will chat about her food and lifestyle brand, "Giadzy."
388	"Episode 388"	November 20, 2024	Jessica Alba, Lizzy Mathis
Jessica Alba and Lizzy Mathis stop by to discuss co-hosting the special "Honest Renovations: A Holiday Makeover."
389	"Episode 389"	November 21, 2024	Courtney B. Vance
Actor Courtney B. Vance will discuss the FX series, "Grotesquerie."
390	"Thanksgiving Show"	November 22, 2024	Ted Danson
Join Jennifer Hudson for a festive Thanksgiving Show that celebrates the warmth and joy of the holidays! Actor Ted Danson visits the show to talk about the Netflix series "A Man on the Inside." Jennifer then welcomes best friends T'Mani Woodland from Charleston, South Carolina, and Amber Mckay from Columbia, South Carolina. The two will share how a video of them dancing went viral, plus the inspiring story of their friendship.
391	"Episode 391"	November 25, 2024	John Legend, Muni Long
In a special episode of "The Jennifer Hudson Show," Jennifer celebrates the music of R&B! Award-winning musician John Legend stops by the show to celebrate the release of "Get Lifted (20th Anniversary)." R&B superstar Muni Long will chat about her four Grammy nominations and her new album, "Revenge." Then, favorite dad and daughter duo, 6-year-old Tatum and Jay Galberth from Washington, D.C., are back, and Jennifer has a big surprise for them!
392	"Episode 392"	November 26, 2024	Dorit Kemsley, Garcelle Beauvais, Kyle Richards, Erika Jayne, Sutton Stracke, Bozoma Saint John, Marvin Sapp
Jennifer sits down for an exclusive interview with "The Real Housewives of Beverly Hills" cast members Dorit Kemsley, Garcelle Beauvais, Kyle Richards, Erika Jayne, Sutton Stracke, and Bozoma Saint John. Then, gospel music legend Marvin Sapp will chat and perform "Never Would Have Made It."
393	"Episode 393"	November 27, 2024	Cynthia Erivo, James Phelps, Oliver Phelps
Actress and singer Cynthia Erivo visits the stage to discuss the highly anticipated film "Wicked." Plus, a magical music moment with Cynthia and Jennifer! Actors James and Oliver Phelps drop by to talk about their new show, "Harry Potter: Wizards of Baking.
394	"Episode 394"	December 2, 2024	Snoop Dogg, Cori Broadus
Snoop Dogg stops by to chat about "The Voice" and is then joined by and his daughter Cori Broadus to discuss their docuseries "Snoop Dogg's Fatherhood: Cori & Wayne's Story." Jennifer also welcomes back 12-year-old kid reporter Jeremiah Fennell from Las Vegas, Nevada.
395	"Episode 395"	December 3, 2024	Yvette Nicole Brown
Yvette Nicole Brown joins the show to discuss the upcoming Motion Picture & Television Fund's telethon. Zoe Oli from Atlanta, Georgia — the 12-year-old CEO and founder of Beautiful Curly Me — joins the show. Zoe chats about the mission of Beautiful Curly Me to empower young Black and Brown girls by providing dolls, books, puzzles, and content that encourages self-love and confidence in their natural hair.
396	"Episode 396"	December 4, 2024	Latto
Rapper Latto sits down for her first talk show interview to chat about her new album "Sugar Honey Iced Tea" and Season 2 of "Rhythm + Flow" on Netflix. Plus, don't miss her epic performance. Jennifer then welcomes Rhiannah Gordon and her kids, Flynn and Rhiley, from Sacramento, California. They share the heartwarming story of the emotional viral video of Rhiannah and her kids finding out she passed the California bar exam. Rhiannah hopes her story encourages others to persevere.
397	"Episode 397"	December 5, 2024	Brian Tyree Henry
Brian Tyree Henry joins Jennifer to talk about his new film, "The Fire Inside." Xylene DeCoteau and her father, Carlond, join the show to share their emotional story. Xylene is a pilot for Mesa Airlines and had the extraordinary opportunity to fly her dad for the first time as a passenger. A video of her inspiring speech went viral as she surprised her dad during the flight, honoring the sacrifices he made to help her achieve her dream of becoming a pilot.
398	"Episode 398"	December 6, 2024	Busta Rhymes
Rapper and actor Busta Rhymes visits the show to talk about his upcoming album "Dragon Season." He'll also perform his song "Do the Busabus Pt.2." Jennifer then welcomes hero Jacob Bell and his wife Jessica from Red Oak, Texas. They share their inspiring story of how Jacob spent 20 years in and out of prison but turned his life around after he met Jessica when he was released in 2017. He recently made headlines for saving two people's lives in the space of six weeks. After a difficult life, Jacob says he's found a renewed sense of purpose and self-worth.
399	"Episode 399"	December 9, 2024	Anthony Anderson, Tyler Posey, Taye Diggs, James Van Der Beek
Jennifer welcomes "The Real Full Monty" stars Anthony Anderson, Tyler Posey, Taye Diggs, and James Van Der Beek in an exclusive cast interview. They'll chat about "The Real Full Monty," a two-hour special in which a group of male celebrities will bare all to raise awareness for cancer research. Next, 9-year-old singer Mirabel Pan Weston from Boston, Massachusetts, joins the show to sing "Hallelujah" and talk about her passionate, award-winning performances around Boston.
400	"Episode 400"	December 10, 2024	Jennifer Love Hewitt, Pat Houston, Rickey Minor
Actress and singer Jennifer Love Hewitt drops by to talk about Lifetime's new film "The Holiday Junkie" and her new book "Inheriting Magic." Pat Houston and world-renowned musician Rickey Minor visit Jennifer and discuss the Whitney Houston concert film "Whitney Houston — The Concert for a New South Africa (Durban)." Jennifer then welcomes Shiller Joseph and his kidney donor, Krissy Miller, from Provo, Utah, as they share their inspiring story. In 2020, Shiller needed a kidney transplant and moved to Provo for his daughter's education. Krissy, inspired to donate a kidney, met Shiller by chance while on a hike. Learning of his need, she offered hers and was a perfect match. Shiller is thriving after a successful transplant in April 2024, and they share a lifelong bond.
401	"Episode 401"	December 11, 2024	Halle Bailey, Smokey Robinson
Actress and singer Halle Bailey and legendary musician Smokey Robinson join the show to chat about their new show, A Motown Christmas Special. Jennifer welcomes back 7-year-old Luke Tillman from Fort Lauderdale, Florida. He gives an update on his upcoming holiday plans and going viral from his memes!
402	"Episode 402"	December 12, 2024	Keith Urban, Aaron Pierre
Award-winning musician Keith Urban joins the show to discuss his new album High and will perform "Wildside". Actor Aaron Pierre talks about the highly anticipated film Mufasa: The Lion King.
403	"Episode 403"	December 13, 2024	Naturi Naughton-Lewis, Lucky Daye
Actress and member of the famed girl group "3LW" Naturi Naughton-Lewis joins Jennifer to discuss her latest projects. Grammy-winning artist Lucky Daye performs his hit "That's You" from his album "Algorithm."
404	"Episode 404"	December 16, 2024	Jeffrey Wright
Award-winning actor Jeffrey Wright stops by to chat about his new series, "The Agency." Jennifer welcomes the Izzo family from Buffalo, New York, to the show! Meggan and Allie have been fostering their three children for the past five years, and a recent video of David, Brooklyn, and Piper learning they finally have an adoption date recently went viral. Meggan and Allie hope to provide representation for diverse modern families and encourage others to consider fostering and adopting.
405	"Episode 405"	December 17, 2024	Michelle Obama
Jennifer has an exclusive interview with former First Lady Michelle Obama, who will make her first appearance on the show! They'll talk about Michelle's new book, "Overcoming: A Workbook." Additionally, they'll discuss Michelle's role as executive producer on the Netflix series "The Later Daters" and will be joined by cast members Logan Ury and Dr. Anise Mastin. Plus, Boston Public School's newest "Teacher of the Year," Ms. Tanisha Milton, visits the show.
406	"Episode 406"	December 18, 2024	Ray Romano, Lisa Kudrow, Luke Wilson, Teyonah Parris, O-T Fagbenle
The cast of the upcoming Netflix dramedy series "No Good Deed," featuring Ray Romano, Lisa Kudrow, Luke Wilson, Teyonah Parris, and O-T Fagbenle, exclusively joins Jennifer to talk about their new series.
407	"Episode 407"	December 19, 2024	Kerry Washington, Ebony Obsidian, Milauna Jackson, Kylie Jefferson, Pepi Sonuga, Shanice Shantay, Sarah Jeffery, Moriah Brown
Jennifer has the exclusive interview with "The Six Triple Eight" cast — Kerry Washington, Ebony Obsidian, Milauna Jackson, Kylie Jefferson, Pepi Sonuga, Shanice Shantay, Sarah Jeffery, and Moriah Brown — to discuss their new movie.
408	"Episode 408"	December 20, 2024	D-Nice
The multi-talented D-Nice joins Jennifer to discuss his New Year's Eve concert at the Walt Disney Concert Hall and fifth anniversary of his iconic "Club Quarantine" sets. Up next, Jennifer welcomes the inspiring Coach Martin Bacon from San Dimas, California. Martin has been a dedicated football coach at Covina High School, where he credits the sport with transforming his life. Growing up in a single-parent household, Martin found father figures in his coaches, who not only guided him but also instilled lifelong values. Motivated by their influence, Martin now pays it forward by mentoring his players both on and off the field. Finally, the one and only Jennifer Hudson will perform "Find the Love" from her holiday album "The Gift of Love."
409	"Episode 409"	January 6, 2025	Karamo
Television host Karamo stops by to talk about the new season of Netflix's "Queer Eye." Plus, tune in for even more from Jennifer's recent chat with former First Lady Michelle Obama in this never-before-aired bonus content!
410	"Episode 410"	January 7, 2025	Joe Manganiello, Tiffany Boone
Actor and host Joe Manganiello visits the show to talk about the newest season of "Deal or No Deal Island." Actress Tiffany Boone makes an appearance to talk about the highly anticipated Disney film "Mufasa: The Lion King." Plus, Jennifer welcomes Ladia Yates and 10-year-old Zamira Bankhead from L.Y.E. Academy in Memphis, Tennessee. After a successful professional career, Ladia wanted to create a safe place where dancers could have opportunities to excel. The dance studio has become a staple and positive example in the community. Her student Zamira's dance videos have been going viral for years.
411	"Episode 411"	January 8, 2025	O'Shea Jackson Jr., Lee Jung-Jae
Actor and rapper O'Shea Jackson Jr. drops by to talk about his new film "Den of Thieves 2: Pantera." Emmy-winning actor Lee Jung-Jae chats with Jennifer about the highly anticipated new season of Netflix's "Squid Game". Jennifer also welcomes Air Force veteran firefighter Durrell Council from Chesterfield, Virginia, to the stage. Durell was recently diagnosed with ALS and hopes to share his story with Jennifer, including how he chooses to let go of fear, speak with joy, and enjoy every moment of life
412	"Episode 412"	January 9, 2025	Jodie Turner-Smith
Jennifer welcomes actress Jodie Turner-Smith to the show to chat about the hit series "The Agency."
413	"Episode 413"	January 10, 2025	Stephanie Hsu
Actress Stephanie Hsu stops by to talk about Peacock's new comedy series "Laid." Plus, TikTok content creator Ace Green from Los Angeles, California, visits the stage and teaches Jennifer and the audience a dance! Ace has gone viral for his livestreams teaching dance moves to different groups of people, including veterans, kids, healthcare workers, and more.
414	"Episode 414"	January 13, 2025	Zachary Quinto, Aloe Blacc
Actor Zachary Quinto visits to talk about his new show, "Brilliant Minds." Singer and rapper Aloe Blacc stops by to chat about his upcoming album "Stand Together." Plus, tune in for a special performance of his song "One Good Thing." Jennifer also welcomes Berhanu Dallas, aka "Dr. Drip," from Atlanta, Georgia, to the show. Dr. Drip is a marketing education teacher at Forest Park High School. Recently, he has gained lots of attention on social media for his humorous videos with his students and how he connects with them.
415	"Episode 415"	January 14, 2025	Andra Day
Singer Andra Day will join Jennifer to chat and perform her new song, "Bricks," from the film "Exhibiting Forgiveness." Andra will also discuss MusiCares relief efforts for the Los Angeles fires. Jennifer welcomes back community leader Tyrone Nance from Inglewood, California. Tyrone is the founder of It's Bigger Than Us, a nonprofit organization that provides solution-based resources to underserved families in South L.A. During the devastating Los Angeles fires, Tyrone and his team bravely stepped into action to help first responders and fire victims.
416	"Episode 416"	January 15, 2025	Chris Perfetti
Jennifer welcomes "Abbott Elementary's" Chris Perfetti to the stage to discuss the fourth season of the popular show and more. Plus, tune in to watch Jeffrey Wall from Dayton, Ohio, teach Jennifer some martial arts! Jeffrey is a sophomore at the University of Cincinnati. He founded Golden Age Karate, where he leads free martial arts classes for senior citizens. His practices build self-esteem, promote empowerment, and help keep everyone social, happy, and healthy.
417	"Episode 417"	January 16, 2025	Janelle James, Mayan Lopez
"Abbott Elementary's" Janelle James is welcomed back to the "Jennifer Hudson Show" stage! Jennifer and Janelle talk about the fourth season of the hit comedy series. Actress Mayan Lopez stops by to talk about the third season of NBC's "Lopez vs. Lopez."
418	"Episode 418"	January 17, 2025	Tasha Cobbs, Mario
Two-time Grammy Award-winning gospel artist Tasha Cobbs Leonard drops by to talk about her latest book, "Do It Anyway Devotional: 60 Days to a Bolder Faith." R&B sensation Mario chats about being on tour with Mary J. Blige and his album "Glad You Came." Plus, he will perform a medley of "Keep Going" and "Let Me Love You."
419	"Episode 419"	January 21, 2025	Mark-Paul Gosselaar
Jennifer welcomes actor Mark-Paul Gosselaar to talk about the second season of his show "Found." Next, couple Aki and Koichi from Irvine, California, stop by. They've gone viral for the "outfit of the day" videos their daughter Yuri posts of them. Within months, the couple gained over a million followers on Instagram. They've been flown to Europe for brand campaigns, appeared in Vogue, and more! Jennifer also welcomes Trell Thomas, founder of Black Excellence Brunch, to discuss his brunch events inspired by Sunday dinners at his mother's house in South Carolina. After moving to Los Angeles, he transformed his gatherings into a platform to showcase the achievements and contributions of Black professionals worldwide.
420	"Episode 420"	January 22, 2025	Andra Day
Singer-songwriter Andra Day makes a special appearance to talk about her song "Bricks" from the film "Exhibiting Forgiveness." Plus, Gina Zapanta and Mike Alder from Los Angeles, California, visit the show. The married couple are lawyers and have long been dedicated to giving back to their community. During the Los Angeles fires, they helped book free hotel rooms for those in need and have collected donations to distribute to disadvantaged people. Jennifer also welcomes back Inglewood, California, community leader Tyrone Nance. Tyrone is the founder of It's Bigger Than Us, a nonprofit organization that provides solution-based resources to underserved families in South L.A. During the devastating Los Angeles fires, Tyrone and his team bravely stepped into action to help first responders and fire victims.
421	"Episode 421"	January 23, 2025	Debbie Allen, J. Ivy
"The Jennifer Hudson Show" partners with the W.K. Kellogg Foundation to host a special episode focused on the National Day of Racial Healing. The special hour is dedicated to helping people of all identities and backgrounds come together, reflect, and begin or continue their journey of healing from the effects of racism. Actress and dancer Debbie Allen joins this special episode and will discuss the impact of the Debbie Allen Dance Academy. Plus, tune in for a performance from Grammy-winning poet J. Ivy!
422	"Episode 422"	January 24, 2025	Shemar Moore, Ryan Destiny
Jennifer welcomes back actor Shemar Moore and they talk about his show "S.W.A.T." Actress Ryan Destiny stops by to talk about her film "The Fire Inside."
423	"Episode 423"	January 27, 2025	Beth Behrs
Actress Beth Behrs stops by to talk about the CBS show "The Neighborhood." Plus, tune in to watch Jennifer and Beth test out the latest social media food trends!
424	"Episode 424"	January 28, 2025	Christina Haack, Tarek El Moussa, Heather Rae El Moussa
Jennifer has an exclusive interview with Christina Haack and Tarek and Heather Rae El Moussa to discuss their HGTV hit series, "The Flip Off." Jennifer welcomes Ashley Benton, founder/CEO of The Green Team Helping Hands Inc., from Greensboro, North Carolina. The nonprofit organization accommodates families, unhoused individuals, and veterans with meals, clothing, and daily necessities. Now, Ashley is feeding hundreds of people monthly, has dozens of volunteers, and receives donations from people and organizations around the world. And tune in for a special demonstration with "The Great American Baking Show" winner Mackenzie Rubish, where Mackenzie and her family teach Jennifer how to make a traditional Samoan cake called puligi!
425	"Episode 425"	January 29, 2025	Lil Rel Howery
Stand-up comedian and actor Lil Rel Howery drops by to talk about the upcoming family film "Dog Man." Jennifer welcomes 2-year-old logo expert Devin and his parents, Trevor Derose and Tatiana Gipson, from Chicago, Illinois. Devin has memorized thousands of logos across various categories, including luxury designers, food and beverage companies, entertainment, and technology. When Devin was 18 months old, he learned the alphabet and became fascinated with learning different words that start with each letter. From there, he became interested in advertisements and logos. Plus, a Beauty Alert with Emmy Award-winning hairstylist Kiyah Wright. Tune in for celebrity hairstyling tips!
426	"Episode 426"	January 30, 2025	Kelly Rowland
Singer and actress Kelly Rowland joins the show. Jennifer welcomes Hadiyah Cummings from Conway, Arkansas. A video of Hadiyah celebrating with her family after finding out she passed the bar exam recently went viral. She says passing the bar was a significant milestone for her being that she grew up in a low socioeconomic household and was a first-generation college student.
427	"Episode 427"	January 31, 2025	Keke Palmer
Actress Keke Palmer drops by to chat about her new film "One of Them Days." 10-year-old Grayson and his mother, Terica Roberts, from Altadena, California, join Jennifer to share their inspiring story. Grayson, who is legally blind due to a chromosomal disorder, lost his home in the Altadena Eaton Fire, evacuating with his family with only a few belongings. Despite losing his Braille items and beloved drum set, Grayson remains positive in a now-viral video, sharing his love for his neighborhood. In 2023, music lover Grayson was surprised by Travis Barker while raising money for visually impaired kids in Ghana. Most recently, Travis gifted him a new drum set! Grayson and his family are looking forward to rebuilding and playing music again.
428	"Episode 428"	February 3, 2025	Sheryl Lee Ralph, Etienne Maurice, Teddy Swims
429	"Episode 429"	February 4, 2025	Usher, Dr. Kedric Taylor
430	"Episode 430"	February 5, 2025	Finola Hughes, Laura Wright, Cameron Mathison, Donnell Turner, Tanisha Harper, Maurice Benard
431	"Episode 431"	February 6, 2025	Heather Headley, Sheila E.
432	"Episode 432"	February 7, 2025	Gina Torres
433	"Episode 433"	February 10, 2025	Colman Domingo
434	"Episode 434"	February 11, 2025	Michelle Williams, Grant Ellis

== Reception ==
=== Critical reception ===
In a review of her first week of shows, Daniel D'Addario of Variety felt that the aim of The Jennifer Hudson Show was "vague" in comparison to its competitors (such as The Kelly Clarkson Show) and "[steered] clear not merely of politics or of Hudson's innermost personal life, which would be completely expected, but from any tension or interest as well". It was also felt that Hudson's interviewing style lacked momentum, arguing that "guests often end up steering the conversation more than they usually might, while Hudson praises them for being sharp or funny without following up with questions."

Coleman Spilde of The Daily Beast was more positive, describing the first week of shows as being "a pleasant surprise that was as amusing as it was gratifying", and praising Hudson for having a "calming effervescence" comparable to Kelly Ripa and Wendy Williams. He observed that Hudson's "constant and sometimes bewildering level of thanks to the people around her, the industry, and God is ever-present", and that "even when it was a little shaky getting its sea legs, Hudson held it together and kept the pace like the consummate professional she is."

The show has gone viral online for its “Spirit Tunnel” pre-show segment shared on social media, in which the show's staff members hype up and welcome guests to the stage by lining the hallway and performing original chants based on guests’ names and/or work. The segment was inspired by host Hudson's Spirit Tunnel welcome to the show on its first and second season. As of January 2025, the segments regularly garner 10 to 100 million views on TikTok. Notable guests whose Spirit Tunnels have gone viral include Gwen Stefani, Ethan Slater, Lee Jung-jae, and Aaron Pierre.

=== Ratings ===
==== Overall ====
Viewership and ratings per season of The Jennifer Hudson Show
Season	Timeslot (ET)	Episodes	First aired		Last aired		TV season	Viewership rank	Avg. viewers (millions)
Season	Timeslot (ET)	Episodes	Date	Viewers (millions)	Date	Viewers (millions)	TV season	Viewership rank	Avg. viewers (millions)
1	Monday–Friday (04:00 PM)	TBA	September 12, 2022	TBA	TBA	TBA	2022–23	TBD	TBD

=== Accolades ===
Year	Award	Category	Nominee(s)	Result	Ref.
2022	People's Choice Awards	Daytime Talk Show of 2022	The Jennifer Hudson Show	Nominated	
2023	NAACP Image Awards	Outstanding Host in a Talk or News / Information (Series or Special)	Jennifer Hudson	Won	
2023	GLAAD Media Awards	Outstanding Variety or Talk Show Episode	Episode: "David Archuleta"	Nominated	
2023	Daytime Emmy Awards	Outstanding Daytime Talk Series	The Jennifer Hudson Show (Note: Recipients: Mary Connelly, Jennifer Hudson, Lisa Kasteler, Andy Lassner, Graehme Morphy, Corey Palent, Walter Williams III, Shani Black, Meredith Fox, Ian Barr, Claudia Gharibian, Michelle Salemi Barr, Jake Bunger, Sully Contreras Bloch, Alexandra Cooley, Gil Rief, Carly Lopez, Drue Madrid, Keetin Marchi, Corey Morris, Bianca Roybal, Na'm Samal, Court Silas, Britton Lynch, Matthew Wright)	Nominated	
2023	Daytime Emmy Awards	Outstanding Promotional Announcement	"EGOT, Hope, and Joy, and Magic" (Note: Recipients: Lon Moeller, Jackie Stubbs, Asheley Hu Roe, Mandy Mullarkey, Emma Seltz, Stevie Udovicic, Raz Loback, Karen Miller, Jasmine Walker, Ryan Moore, Paul Brodie, Gary Lister, Robert Rodriguez, Celia Hubbard Ryan, Marek Szaniawski, Amir Thomas-Reed, Laura Cryan, Caitlin Vetere, Evan Adelsberg, Cory Lewis, Franklin Retena, Adam Cravens, Miriam Hughes, Walker Lere, Brad Oberholtzer, David Whiteside, Brad Henson, Joe Barry, Misha Bermele, Jim Jones, Joe Quinto, Chris Burgess, David Schlesinger, Johnny Wong, Jena Holtzer, Giovanni Rodriguez, Art Perez, Blake Lattanzio, Calvin Lo, Tania Duse, Luna Stohler, Andrew Zamora)	Nominated	
2023	Daytime Emmy Awards	Outstanding Costume Design/Styling	Verneccia Étienne, Jacey Stamler, Tiffany McPherson, Layla Witmer	Nominated	
2023	Daytime Emmy Awards	Outstanding Hairstyling and Makeup	Albert Morrison, Adam Burrell, Robear Landeros, Marie-Flore Beaubien	Nominated	
2023	Daytime Emmy Awards	Outstanding Technical Direction, Camera Work, Video	JD Orozco, Jay Alarcon, Forrest "Chip" Fraser, Jeremy Freeman, Nate Payton, Paul Wileman, Chuck Reilly, Charles Silas	Nominated	
2023	Daytime Emmy Awards	Outstanding Live Sound Mixing and Sound Editing	Mike Stock, Liz Cabral, Tig Moore, Josue Pena, Philip A. Gebhardt, Marilyn Loud, Ron Thompson	Nominated	
2024	People's Choice Awards	The Daytime Talk Show	The Jennifer Hudson Show	Nominated	
2024	GLAAD Media Awards	Outstanding Variety or Talk Show Episode	Episode: "Jennifer Hudson surprises HIV Activist with $10,000"	Won	
2024	NAACP Image Awards	Outstanding Talk Series	The Jennifer Hudson Show	Won	
2024	Daytime Emmy Awards	Outstanding Daytime Talk Series	The Jennifer Hudson Show	Nominated	
2024	Daytime Emmy Awards	Outstanding Live Sound Mixing and Sound Editing	The Jennifer Hudson Show	Nominated	
2024	Daytime Emmy Awards	Outstanding Lighting Direction	The Jennifer Hudson Show	Nominated	
2024	Daytime Emmy Awards	Outstanding Costume Design/Styling	The Jennifer Hudson Show	Nominated	
2024	Black Reel Television Awards	Outstanding Variety, Sketch, or Talk – Series or Special	The Jennifer Hudson Show	Nominated	
2025	NAACP Image Awards	Outstanding Talk Series	The Jennifer Hudson Show	Won	
2025	NAACP Image Awards	Outstanding Host in a Talk or News / Information (Series or Special)	Jennifer Hudson	Won	
2025	Webby Awards	Best Social Video Short Form – Television & Film	The Jennifer Hudson Show	Won	
