= Marianly Tejada =

Dominican actress

- Born: Marianly Tejada Burgos; 4 July 1992 (age 34); San Francisco de Macorís, Dominican Republic
- Occupations: Actress; model
- Television: One of Us Is Lying
- Spouse: Steve Bean
- Children: 1
- Beauty pageant titleholder
- Title: Miss Mundo Dominicana 2011
- Years active: 2011–present
- Major competitions: Miss Mundo Dominicana 2011 (Winner); Miss World 2011 (Unplaced)

Marianly Tejada Burgos (born 4 July 1992) is a Dominican actress and model who was crowned Miss Mundo Dominicana 2011 and represented Dominican Republic at Miss World 2011 pageant but was unplaced. As an actress, her appearances include Bronwyn Rojas in the critically praised Peacock series One of Us Is Lying (2021–2022).

== Early life ==
She was born on 4 July 1992 in San Francisco de Macorís. She did ballet dancing between the ages of six and 14 years-old. She later moved to New York City.

== Career ==
=== Model ===
As a model, she was crowned Miss Mundo Dominicana in 2011. She subsequently represented Dominican Republic in London at Miss World.

=== Actress ===
Tejada began her acting career in 2013, when made her television debut in the romantic comedy film Who's the Boss?. She had television roles in The Purge and Orange is the New Black. In October 2019, she was cast in Peacock's pilot for the mystery drama series One of Us Is Lying. Based on Karen M. McManus's 2017 novel of the same name, it follows a group of students who become murder suspects after the death of their classmate. She portrays Bronwyn, a top-of-the-class student with a focus on her future. The series was given a series order in 2020, although the production was delayed by COVID-19 pandemic. She played the role in two series broadcast in 2021 and 2022 with the role of her sister played by Melissa Collazo.

In 2024, she was cast in Netflix romantic western series Ransom Canyon based on the Jodi Thomas series of books.

== Personal life ==
Tejada is married to Major League Baseball agent Steve Bean. They have one child.

== Partial filmography ==
Key
| † | Denotes works that have not yet been released |

| Year | Title | Role | Notes |
|---|---|---|---|
| 2013 | Who's the Boss? | Patricia | Film |
| 2014 | Once Upon a Fish | Mujer 3 | Film |
| 2016 | Cordones Necios | Claudia | Short film |
| 2018 | Bridecon | Estephany | |
| 2019 | The Purge | Sofia Carmona | 2 episodes |
| 2019 | Orange Is the New Black | Elena Mendoza | 2 episodes |
| 2021–2022 | One of Us Is Lying | Bronwyn Rojas | Main cast |
| 2025 | Ransom Canyon | Ellie Estevez | 10 episodes |
