= Melissa Collazo =

American actress

- Born: July 15, 2000 (age 25); Orlando, Florida, United States
- Occupation: Actress
- Years active: 2017–present
- Television: One of Us Is Lying

Melissa Collazo (born July 15, 2000) is an American television and film actress. She is best known for playing Maeve Rojas on the Peacock original series One of Us Is Lying and Caitlyn Torres in the Prime Video series Motorheads.

== Early life ==
Collazo was born in Orlando, Florida on July 15, 2000 to Puerto Rican parents. She has a younger brother born in 2005. Her mother was the news director at the Hispanic American station Telemundo, and Collazo led child-friendly news segments on the station until she was about 12 years-old, when she decided to pursue acting.

== Career ==
She appeared in Stranger Things and in the 2018 film The Little Mermaid. She had a role in the 2020 film Freaky and in Swamp Thing, playing a younger version of the lead character Abby.

In 2021, she appeared in a lead role in the film Lena and Snowball. In 2021, she could also be seen playing Maeve Rojas on the Peacock (streaming service) teen slasher whodunnit series One of Us Is Lying, alongside Jess McLeod and Marianly Tejada. She returned to the role for a second series in 2022.

In 2024, she began filming Motorheads for Amazon Prime Video with Ryan Phillippe.

== Filmography ==
Key
†	Denotes works that have not yet been released

Year	Title	Role	Notes
2017	Stranger Things	Arcade Gamer	3 episodes
2018	The Little Mermaid	Circus oddity	
2019	Swamp Thing	Teen Abby	2 episodes
2020	Freaky	Ryler	
2021	Lena and Snowball	Lena	Lead role
2021–2022	One of Us Is Lying	Maeve Rojas	Main role
2025	Motorheads	Caitlin	Main role
TBA	Buster Brooks†	Lucy	Post-production
