= One of Us Is Next =

Thriller novel by Karen M. McManus

- Author: Karen M. McManus
- Language: English
- Series: One of Us Is Lying
- Release number: 2nd in series
- Genre: Thriller; Mystery
- Publisher: Delacorte Press
- Publication date: January 7, 2020
- Publication place: United States
- Pages: 384 (hardcover); 416 (paperback)
- ISBN: 978-0525707967
- Preceded by: One of Us Is Lying
- Followed by: One of Us Is Back

One of Us Is Next is a mystery thriller novel by Karen M. McManus and the sequel to One of Us Is Lying (2017). Set a year after the events of the first book, it follows three Bayview High students—Maeve Rojas, Knox Myers, and Phoebe Lawton—as an anonymous texter begins a game of truth or dare that has fatal consequences. First published on January 7, 2020, the novel has received generally positive reviews. A sequel, One of Us Is Back, was published on July 23, 2023.

The novel formed the basis for the eight-episode second season of the teen drama mystery television series One of Us Is Lying, which was released to the streaming service Peacock on October 7, 2021.

== Reception ==
The book has received positive reviews from The Guardian, Kirkus Reviews, and Common Sense Media.

== Sequel ==
A sequel, One of Us Is Back, was published by Delacorte Press on July 23, 2023.
