= April Blair =

American screenwriter and producer

- Occupations: Screenwriter; television producer
- Years active: 1996–present
- Notable work: Jane by Design; All American; Ransom Canyon

April Blair is an American writer and producer of film and television. Blair has written scripts for the films, Christmas Caper, Private Valentine: Blonde & Dangerous, Lemonade Mouth. She also co-wrote with director Tom Bezucha, the film Monte Carlo starring Selena Gomez, Leighton Meester and Katie Cassidy.

Blair has written episodes for the television series, Hart of Dixie, Reign, The Shannara Chronicles, You, Gossip Girl (2021 revival), and Wednesday. She is also the creator and executive producer of the 2012 Freeform (formerly ABC Family until 2016) series Jane by Design and the 2018 The CW series All American. In 2025, she developed and executive produced the Netflix series Ransom Canyon, based on Jodi Thomas' novel series of the same name.

== Filmography ==
=== Feature films ===
- Private Valentine: Blonde & Dangerous (2008) (writer)
- Monte Carlo (2011) (screenplay)

=== Television ===
| Year | Title | Creator | Writer | Executive producer | Notes |
|---|---|---|---|---|---|
| 2006 | Christmas Caper | No | Yes | No | Television film |
| 2011 | Lemonade Mouth | No | Teleplay | No | Television film |
| 2012 | Jane by Design | Yes | Yes | Yes | |
| 2014–15 | Hart of Dixie | No | Yes | Co-executive | |
| 2015–17 | Reign | No | Yes | Yes | |
| 2016 | Scream | No | No | Consulting | |
| 2016–17 | The Shannara Chronicles | No | Yes | Co-executive | |
| 2018 | You | No | Yes | Co-executive | |
| 2018–19 | All American | Yes | Yes | Yes | |
| 2019 | Into the Badlands | No | No | Consulting | |
| 2021–23 | Gossip Girl | No | Yes | Yes | |
| 2022 | Wednesday | No | Yes | Yes | |
| 2025–26 | Ransom Canyon | Developer | Yes | Yes | |
