= Karen M. McManus =

American author of young adult fiction

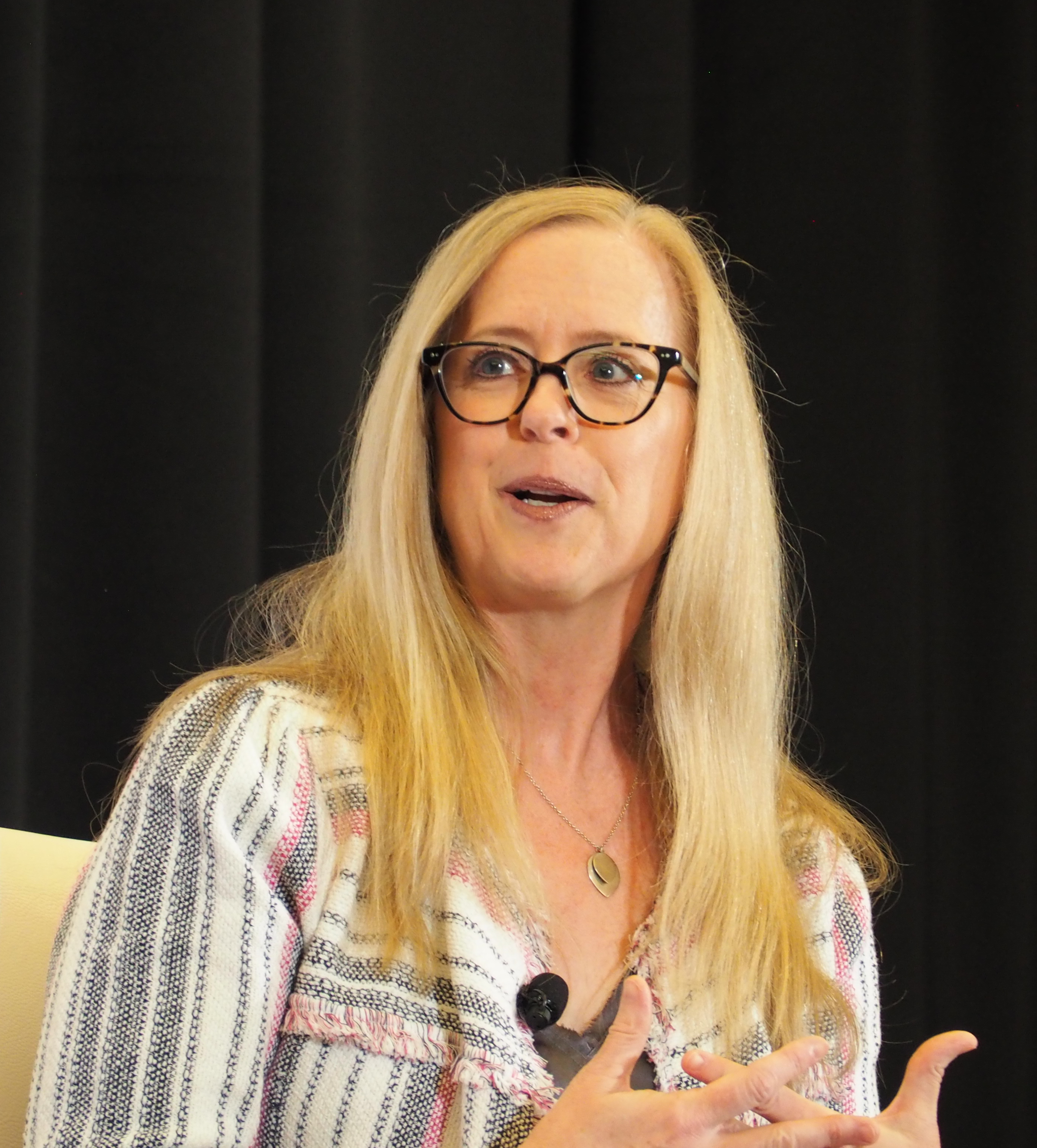
- Born: 1969 (age 56–57)
- Education: College of the Holy Cross (BA); Northeastern University (MA)
- Writing career
- Language: English
- Years active: 2017–present
- Genres: Young adult, mystery
- Notable work: One of Us Is Lying (2017); One of Us Is Next (2020); Nothing More To Tell (2022)
- Website: www.karenmcmanus.com

Karen M. McManus (born 1969) is an American author of young adult fiction. She is most known for her first novel, One of Us Is Lying, which spent more than five years on The New York Times Best Seller list, as well as its sequels One of Us Is Next and One of Us Is Back, and the stand-alone novels Two Can Keep a Secret, You'll Be the Death of Me, The Cousins, Nothing More to Tell, and Such Charming Liars.

== Early life and education ==
McManus discovered an interest for writing when she was eight years old and was assigned to write a story in school. She graduated from the College of the Holy Cross with a B.A. in English literature in 1991, then earned an M.A. in journalism from Northeastern University.

== One of Us is Lying trilogy (2017–2023) ==
McManus' One of Us is Lying series consists of three novels: One of Us is Lying (2017), One of Us Is Next (2020), and One of Us Is Back (2023). The first two books were both #1 New York Times, USA Today, ABA IndieBound, and international bestsellers, while the third was a New York Times bestseller.

One of Us Is Lying was optioned as a pilot by NBC. The television adaption, starring Mark McKenna, Annalisa Cochrane, Chibuikem Uche, Marianly Tejada, and Cooper van Grootel, premiered on Peacock in October 2021.

== Standalone novels ==
Two Can Keep a Secret was McManus’ first standalone novel. Kirkus Reviews gave it a starred review and named it one of the best books of 2019.

The Cousins, McManus's second standalone novel and fourth novel overall, was a #1 New York Times bestseller and an Edgar Award nominee.

Her further standalone novels include You'll Be the Death of Me (2021), Nothing More To Tell (2022), and Such Charming Liars (2024).

Her debut adult novel, Dying to be Us, is scheduled for publication by Berkley Publishing Group in 2027.

== Personal life ==
McManus lives in Cambridge, Massachusetts. She has one son.

She rereads The Secret History by Donna Tartt every year.

== Works ==
=== One of Us Is Lying trilogy ===
1. One of Us Is Lying (Delacorte Press, 2017)
2. One of Us Is Next (Delacorte Press, 2020)
3. One of Us Is Back (Delacorte Press, 2023)

=== Standalone works ===
- Two Can Keep a Secret (Delacorte Press, 2019)
- The Cousins (Delacorte Press, 2020)
- You'll Be the Death of Me (November 2021)
- Nothing More To Tell (Random House, 30 August 2022)
- Such Charming Liars (Random House, 30 July 2024)
- Marple: Twelve New Stories (contributor to continuation collection authorised for Miss Marple (2022))
