= Jack Schumacher (actor) =

American actor

- Born: June 18, 1993 (age 32); Chicago, Illinois
- Occupation: Actor
- Years active: 2016-

Jack Schumacher is an American actor, best known for his role as Yancy Grey in Netflix the western drama, Ransom Canyon (2025).

== Career ==
Schumacher made his television debut in an episode of Empire in 2016 (prior to that he also appeared in Chicago P.D. and S.W.A.T.) He appeared as Omaha alongside Tom Cruise on the 2022 action sequel Top Gun: Maverick directed by Joseph Kosinski and a follow-up to Tony Scott's film Top Gun (1986). He played roles in the Hulu series Welcome to Chippendales, the 2024 romantic comedy film The Engagement Plan, and the psychological drama series The Irrational. In November 2024, he was cast in the romantic comedy 40 Dates and 40 Nights. In 2025, he could be seen playing mysterious drifter, Yancy, in the Netflix contemporary western series Ransom Canyon.

== Personal life ==
Schumacher is from Chicago. After having addiction issues, he described himself as “three and-a-half years sober" when interviewed in April 2025. Schumacher was briefly married to actress MacKinlee Waddell in 2022. In 2024, Waddell revealed on the Hot & Single Podcast that their marriage only lasted six months. In addition, she mentioned he ended their marriage by ghosting her "via text message". Schumacher is in a relationship with fellow actress Jennifer Ens, who co-starred alongside him in Ransom Canyon.

== Filmography ==
| Year | Title | Role | Notes |
|---|---|---|---|
| 2016 | Empire | Blogger | 1 episode |
| 2017 | Chicago P.D. | James Moony | 1 episode |
| 2018 | Solve | The Boyfriend | |
| 2018 | Dumpcake Comedy | Greg | 1 episode |
| 2020 | S.W.A.T. | Jacob | 1 episode |
| 2022 | Top Gun: Maverick | Neil 'Omaha' Vikander | Feature film |
| 2022 | KillHer | Jagger | |
| 2022 | Welcome to Chippendales | Nate McCollum | 1 episode |
| 2024 | The Engagement Plan | Wade | TV movie |
| 2024 | The Irrational | Sebastian Winn | |
| 2025 | Ransom Canyon | Yancy Grey | Main cast |
| TBA | 40 Dates and 40 Nights | TBA | |
