= The Audacity =

2026 American dark comedy television series

- Genre: Dark comedy; Drama; Satire
- Created by: Jonathan Glatzer
- Showrunner: Jonathan Glatzer
- Starring: Billy Magnussen; Sarah Goldberg; Lucy Punch; Meaghan Rath; Paul Adelstein; Everett Blunck; Thailey Roberge; Ava Marie Telek; Rob Corddry; Simon Helberg
- Music by: Danny Bensi; Saunder Jurriaans
- Country of origin: United States
- Original language: English
- No. of seasons: 1
- No. of episodes: 8

Production
- Executive producers: Lucy Forbes; Semi Chellas; Gina Mingacci; Jonathan Glatzer
- Cinematography: Paula Huidobro; Richard Rutkowski
- Editors: Ron Rosen; Steven Rasch; Jordan Kim; Janet Weinberg
- Running time: 61–67 minutes
- Production companies: Run River Films; Words Fail; AMC Studios

Original release
- Network: AMC; AMC+
- Release: April 12, 2026 – present

The Audacity is an American dark comedy drama television series created by Jonathan Glatzer for AMC and AMC+. The series premiered on April 12, 2026. In March 2026, ahead of the series premiere, the series was renewed for a second season.

== Premise ==
A self-appointed "inventor of the future" tech CEO and his self-serving "performance psychologist" are engulfed in a scandal sparked by the exploitation of personal data.

== Cast and characters ==
=== Main ===
- Billy Magnussen as Duncan Park, the CEO of Hypergnosis
- Sarah Goldberg as JoAnne Felder, Duncan's therapist whom he blackmails into participating in a white-collar crime
- Lucy Punch as Lili Park-Hoffsteader, Duncan's wife
- Meaghan Rath as Anushka Bhattachera-Phister, the chief ethics officer and a board member at Hypergnosis and Duncan's former mistress
- Paul Adelstein as Dr. Gary Felder, JoAnne's husband and a psychiatrist
- Everett Blunck as Orson Stern, JoAnne's son and Gary's stepson who reluctantly moved from Baltimore to Palo Alto
- Thailey Roberge as Tess Phister, Anushka's stepdaughter and Martin's daughter
- Ava Marie Telek as Jamison Park-Hoffsteader, Duncan and Lili's daughter
- Rob Corddry as Tom Ruffage, the Deputy Under Secretary of Veterans Affairs who is trying make a deal with Hypergnosis (season 1)
- Simon Helberg as Martin Phister, Anushka's husband
- Jess McLeod (season 2; recurring season 1) as Harper, the chief technology officer of Hypergnosis

=== Recurring ===
- Zach Galifianakis as Carl Bardolph, a client of JoAnne
- Andrew Bushell as Jeffery Carter, Tom's coworker at the Department of Veterans Affairs
- Rukiya Bernard as Beatrice Webb, the headmistress of Las Altas School, where Orson, Tess, and Jamison attend
- Curtis Lum as Tim Kwan, an executive team member of the tech company Cupertino
- Randall Park as Gabe, the chief financial officer of Hypergnosis

== Episodes ==
No.	Title	Directed by	Written by	Original release date (Note: Episodes 2–8 were broadcast on AMC+ one week before their linear premiere on AMC)
1	"Best of All Possible Worlds"	Lucy Forbes	Jonathan Glatzer	April 12, 2026
2	"Shine Brightly"	Lucy Forbes	Charlotte Ahlin & Semi Chellas	April 19, 2026
3	"Valley of Heart's Delight"	Daniel Sackheim	Jonathan Glatzer & Marie Hanhnhon Nguyen	April 26, 2026
4	"Vanitas"	Daniel Sackheim	Arthur Phillips & Irving Ruan	May 3, 2026
5	"Lamplighters"	Daniel Gray Longino	Jonathan Glatzer & Charlotte Ahlin	May 10, 2026
6	"Sandbox"	Daniel Gray Longino	Semi Chellas & Arthur Phillips	May 17, 2026
7	"Foundering"	Alex Buono	Arthur Phillips & Semi Chellas	May 24, 2026
8	"Granfalloon"	Alex Buono	Teleplay by : Jonathan Glatzer; Story by : Jonathan Glatzer & Semi Chellas & Arthur Phillips	May 31, 2026

== Production ==
=== Development ===
On June 27, 2024, AMC gave Jonathan Glatzer's drama series about Silicon Valley a straight-to-series order. On April 9, 2025, the series was officially titled The Audacity, with Gina Mingacci executive producing the series and Glatzer serving as the showrunner. On April 24, 2025, Lucy Forbes was set to direct both the pilot and second episode.

On March 7, 2026, ahead of the series premiere, AMC renewed the series for a second season. A majority of the series is filmed in Vancouver, Canada, but some scenes in the second season were filmed in the Silicon Valley town of Woodside.

=== Casting ===
On January 30, 2025, Sarah Goldberg was cast in the series. In February 2025, Billy Magnussen, Rob Corddry, Meaghan Rath, and Simon Helberg were cast in the series. On March 5, 2025, Paul Adelstein was cast in the series. On April 9, 2025, Zach Galifianakis was cast in a recurring role. On April 24, 2025, Lucy Punch, Everett Blunck, Thailey Roberge, and Ava Marie Telek were added to the main cast, and Randall Park was cast in a recurring role before production started on the first season. On June 3, 2026, Jess McLeod was promoted to series regular for the second season, and later that summer, Miriam Shor and Usman Ally were cast for the second season.

== Release ==
The Audacity was first shown at SXSW on March 14, 2026. The series officially premiered on AMC and AMC+ on April 12, 2026.

== Reception ==
On the review aggregator website Rotten Tomatoes, the series holds a 75% approval rating based on 32 critic reviews. The website's critics consensus reads, "Standing on the precipice of overstaying its welcome, this Silicon Valley farce places its callous, fascinating, and unpleasant personalities front and center to rapturous effect, proving this series has The Audacity." Metacritic, which uses a weighted average, gave a score of 62 out of 100 based on 18 critics, indicating "generally favorable".
