= Eve of Destruction (miniseries) =

- Genre: Science fiction, drama
- Directed by: Robert Lieberman
- Starring: Steven Weber; Christina Cox; Treat Williams; Aleks Paunovic
- Countries of origin: United States; Canada
- No. of episodes: 2

Production
- Running time: 90 minutes per episode / 180 minutes, total.
- Production company: Reunion Pictures

Original release
- Network: Showcase
- Release: March 23 – March 30, 2013

Eve of Destruction is a two-part television miniseries directed by Robert Lieberman. The miniseries was first aired in 2013.

== Plot ==
When an experiment to harvest a limitless pool of "dark energy" goes awry, scientists scramble to fix their deadly mistake before more lives are lost.

== Cast ==
- Steven Weber : Dr. Karl Dameron
- Christina Cox : Dr. Rachel Reed
- Treat Williams : Max Salinger
- Aleks Paunovic : Ruslan
- Colin Lawrence : David Jackson
- Jess McLeod : Ruby Dameron
- Leah Gibson : Chloe Banks
- Eli Goree : Madhatter53
- Michael P. Northey : Dominic

== Reception ==
Radio Times said, "Favouring unnecessary padding over character and story development, the cut-down TV mini-series ends up mainly talk and no drama, as boffins Steven Weber and Christina Cox seem to bore even themselves with their dry and incessant pseudo-science."
