= Ransom Canyon (TV series) =

American television series

- Promotional release poster
- Genre: Romance drama; Neo-Western
- Based on: Ransom Canyon by Jodi Thomas
- Developed by: April Blair
- Starring: Josh Duhamel; Minka Kelly; Eoin Macken; Lizzy Greene; Garrett Wareing; Marianly Tejada; Jack Schumacher; Andrew Liner; James Brolin; Casey W. Johnson
- Composer: Jeff Cardoni
- Original language: English
- No. of seasons: 2
- No. of episodes: 18

Production
- Executive producers: April Blair; Joe Fazzio; Dan Angel; Amanda Marsalis; Josh Duhamel; Adam Milch; Kelli Breslin; Neil Reynolds; Bradley Gardner; Minka Kelly
- Producer: Anne M. Uemura
- Production companies: Fezziwig Studios; April Blair's Company

Original release
- Network: Netflix
- Release: April 17, 2025 – July 23, 2026

Ransom Canyon is an American romantic neo-Western television series based on the Ransom Canyon novel series by Jodi Thomas. It premiered on Netflix in the United States on April 17, 2025. In June 2025, the series was renewed for a second season which premiered on July 23, 2026. In September 2026, the series was canceled after two seasons.

== Premise ==
With three ranching family dynasties locked in a contest for control of the land, their lives and legacies are threatened by outside forces intent on destroying their way of life. At the center of it all is stoic rancher Staten Kirkland (Duhamel), who is healing from heartbreaking loss and on a quest for vengeance. Staten's only glimmer of hope rests in the eyes and heart of Quinn O'Grady (Kelly), longtime family friend and owner of the local dancehall. But as the battle to save Ransom wages on, a mysterious cowboy drifts into town, dredging up secrets from the past. Vice tightening, Staten fights to protect the land he calls home, and the only love that can pull him back from the demons that haunt him.

== Cast ==
=== Main ===
- Josh Duhamel as Staten Kirkland
- Minka Kelly as Quinn O'Grady
- Eoin Macken as Davis Collins (season 1)
- Lizzy Greene as Lauren Brigman
- Garrett Wareing as Lucas Russell
- Marianly Tejada as Ellie Estevez
- Jack Schumacher as Yancy Grey
- Andrew Liner as Reid Collins (season 1)
- James Brolin as Cap Fuller (season 1)
- Casey W. Johnson as Kit Russell (season 2; recurring season 1)

=== Recurring ===
- Philip Winchester as Sheriff Dan Brigman
- Brett Cullen as Sam Kirkland
- Kate Burton as Katherine Bullock
- Jaren Robledo as Jack Yellowbird
- Jennifer Ens as Ashley Keo
- Niko Guardado as Tim O'Grady
- Justin Johnson Cortez as Kai
- Tatanka Means as Jake Longbow
- Meta Golding as Paula Jo (season 1)
- Kenneth Miller as Freddie (season 1; guest season 2)
- Lauren Glazier as Angie O'Grady (season 2; guest season 1)
- Ben Robson as Oliver (season 2)
- Patricia Clarkson as Claire O'Grady (season 2)
- Heidi Grace Engerman as Sidney (season 2)
- Bridget Regan as Mary Lou (season 2)

=== Guest ===
- Charley Crockett as himself (season 1)
- Matt Medrano as Adam Allen (season 1)
- Dan Reynolds as Billy Brinks (season 1)
- Steve Howey as Levi (season 2)
- Rob Huebel (season 2)
- Rigo Sanchez as Derrick (season 2)
- John Diehl (season 2)
- Thomas Rhett as himself (season 2)
- Jordan Davis as himself (season 2)

== Series overview ==
Season	Episodes	Originally released
1	10	April 17, 2025
2	8	July 23, 2026

== Episodes ==
=== Season 1 (2025) ===
No. overall	No. in season	Title	Directed by	Written by	Original release date
1	1	"Don't Let Me Fall"	Amanda Marsalis	April Blair	April 17, 2025
It's Randall Kirkland's 16th birthday. His relationship with his father, Staten, is strained years after the death of his mother, Amalah. At the party, Staten flirts with Quinn, who was Amalah's best friend. Randall's uncle (Amalah's brother), Davis, gifts him a car for his birthday, without his father's knowledge. At home, father and son argue and Randall takes the car out. Later that night, Staten gets a call from the Sheriff; Randall has been in an accident and died. A year later, Davis asks out Quinn but is rebuffed. Quinn and Staten attend a high school football game together where a banner memorializing Randall is displayed. Later, at a party, Lauren & Lucas secretly make out, despite her previous involvement with Randall's cousin, Reid. Yancy arrives at the Fuller Ranch as the new farmhand. Ellie becomes suspicious of Yancy after finding an old newspaper article about Cap Fuller in a book in his room. Davis visits Staten and urges Staten to sell part of his land for a pipeline but he says no. Staten finds a piece of a car at the site of his son's car crash and takes it to the Sheriff, hypothesizing there was another car on the road when his son died. After a frosty interaction with Staten, Quinn accepts Davis's dinner invitation. Staten sees them together and leaves in a haste. After an accident at an abandoned house, it is revealed that Lauren's father is the Sheriff and he forbids her from seeing Lucas telling her that his family is trouble. Later, Quinn tells Staten how she feels about him and he rejects her. Yancy is in cahoots with Davis and they talk about their "plan."
2	2	"Sure as the Day Is Long"	Amanda Marsalis	April Blair	April 17, 2025
Staten visits Quinn but she is still hurt by his rejection. Lucas starts his new job at Staten's ranch but is being ignored by Lauren. Staten takes the car piece he found to a garage and it is confirmed to be a different car than what his son was driving the night of the crash. Davis confesses his feelings to Quinn. Staten gets drunk at the bar and Quinn takes him home. When Staten wakes up, he realizes that his father has come for a visit and is planning on having a party for his election campaign. Lucas bails his brother out of jail. Cap gives Yancy his late son, Lincoln's suit for the Kirklands' party. Quinn is offered a spot as a pianist in the Philharmonic. Lauren argues with her alcoholic mother about her future. Quinn and Davis attend the party together, to Staten's dismay while Lauren and Reid attend the party together, to Lucas's surprise. Desperate for money, Quinn agrees to a deal with Austin Water and Power. Lucas confronts Lauren and they kiss. Later, Lucas sees Lauren comforting Reid and they leave the party together. Staten angers Quinn and she storms out of the party with Davis. When Lauren gets home, she finds a note that her mother has left. Yancy visits Cap's wife at the nursing home and tells her that she is his grandmother.
3	3	"Trouble Can Be Fun Sometimes"	David McWhirter	Joe Fazzio	April 17, 2025
In flashbacks, we see Yancy is in jail and is visited by Davis. Yancy wrote to Davis explaining that he is Lincoln Fuller's son and has pictures as proof. They devise a plan to get Yancy out of jail so he can either persuade Cap to sell his land to Austin Water and Power or take the land from him. In the present, Yancy gets closer to Ellie. Quinn ignores phone calls from Katherine regarding the Philharmonic offer. Yancy runs into two of his former jailmates in town and alerts Davis. They take precautions to try to get them out of town. Lucas's brother, Kit, resurfaces with money, despite not showing up for work. When Lucas questions it, Kit shares he's been working a side hustle which Lucas is suspicious of. Quinn's sister, Angie, tells her to forget Staten and pursue Davis. Everyone shows up at the dance hall to support Quinn. Quinn continues to ignore calls from Katherine, but then she surprises Quinn by showing up at the dance hall. Staten continues to try to make amends with Quinn and they dance together until Davis cuts in. Davis and Staten argue about the night of the accident and when Davis asks Reid what happened, Reid finally tells the truth. Katherine tries to persuade Quinn to take the job in New York but Quinn is unsure. Katherine tells her that she is meant for more, to think about it and that auditions are six weeks away. Lauren tells Lucas that she wants to be with him but no one can know. At first, Lucas says he cannot lie to people but then changes his mind and they kiss. Reid shows up at Staten's after his father kicks him out.
4	4	"That Boy Is My Whole Heart"	David McWhirter	Paul Haapaniemi	April 17, 2025
The episode opens with two masked people cutting a ranch's wire fence and letting out the cattle. Quinn finds a rogue cow, with Staten's brand, in her barn. Staten comes over to get his cow and they bicker. Lauren and Lucas continue to see each other and after, Lucas finds the cut wire and alerts Staten. Staten confronts Davis about the cut wire but Davis denies any involvement. Quinn and Davis get into an argument about Reid and Staten. Staten tries to get rid of Reid by forcing him to do work at the ranch and they all go out in search of the missing cattle. When they find the herd, Reid and Lucas fight and a calf goes missing. Reid volunteers to look for it and Staten tells Lucas to go with him. They find the calf stuck in a bog and they decide to try to get him out. Ellie questions Yancy about his "friends" but Yancy expertly evades her questions by instead telling her about his troubled childhood. Davis shows up at Quinn's to apologize and confides in her about his ranch's dire financial state. Davis explains that is why he is pushing for the pipeline. Quinn tells Davis about the job offer. Lucas and Reid argue about how to get the calf out and after they fight, they drink a beer together and talk. Eventually, they work together and successfully free the calf. The Sheriff follows up on the car part that Staten found. Cap interrupts a moment between Ellie & Yancy and tells Yancy that he bought some cattle from "his friends." Yancy figures out they stole cattle from Staten and resold it to Cap for a profit. Yancy tells them he'll give them $20,000 to leave town. Realizing that Reid is grieving too, Staten allows him to stay. After looking at the surveillance footage, the Sheriff finds the truck and sees Reid dropping it off at the chop shop.
5	5	"I Love a Good Secret"	Meera Menon	Laura Nava	April 17, 2025
Davis and Quinn sleep together. The next morning, Davis's ex wife (and Reid's mom), Paula Jo, shows up which irritates Quinn. After Quinn leaves, Davis and Paula Jo argue about the ranch and the pipeline. Paula Jo visits Staten and tries to get him to sell but he tells her no. At the rodeo, Yancy and Ellie kiss. The Sheriff's deputy tells Ellie his concerns about Yancy but she dismisses them. The Sheriff questions Tim and Reid about the night of Randall's car accident. Paula Jo approaches Cap about selling but Staten intervenes. Lucas overhears Tim and Reid arguing. Freddie tell Yancy to throw the next ride because they can make more money betting against him. Staten confesses his true feelings to Quinn and asks her to be with him but she tells him it's too late. Lauren breaks up with Reid and he punches Lucas. Yancy wins the rodeo and the $20,000 but Freddie is irate. However, Freddie is arrested and Cap tells Yancy that he is proud of him. Staten and Paula Jo have sex.
6	6	"We Need to Talk About Reid"	Meera Menon	Luca Rojas	April 17, 2025
In a flashback, we see the night of Randall's accident and the truck is shown to be at the scene. In the present, Lucas tells Lauren he is planning on going to the University of Texas for college so they can be together. Paula Jo tells Quinn about her rendezvous with Staten at the rodeo. The Sheriff questions Lauren about the night of Randall's car accident and she tells him that Reid was not with her, like he said he was. After finding out he's been visiting Cap's wife, Ruth, at the nursing home, Ellie snoops around Yancy's room. He returns to find her there and they have sex. Ellie questions Yancy about his visits with Ruth. Quinn bails Staten out of jail. Paula Jo meets with two crooked businessmen about falsifying data on the well water on Staten's ranch which would cost him millions. Paula Jo blackmails Quinn into not telling Staten about the meeting. Lucas finds a truck at the bottom of the river and the police come to investigate. Ellie goes to see Freddie in jail.
7	7	"By the Grace of God"	Michael Offer	Joe Fazzio	April 17, 2025
The truck is pulled from the river and it matches the piece Staten found. Lauren gets a job as a waitress at the dance hall. Sheriff Brigman questions Reid about the night of Randall's car accident but a tornado warning cuts their conversation short. Ellie tells Yancy that she knows all about him, his past and guesses correctly that Cap is his grandfather. She tells him that she wants nothing to do with him. Staten and Quinn shelter together and she tells him she knows he slept with Paula Jo. Lauren is injured in the storm while trying to leave the Russells' so Kit takes care of her and they bond over their traumatic childhoods. At the dance hall, Davis confronts Cap about his unwillingness to sell and Cap tells Davis that he doesn't have a will so even after he dies, his land will be tied up in court for years. Staten attempts to apologize to Quinn but they end up arguing about Davis. Later, they reminisce about high school and they have sex. Despite Davis's protests, Yancy goes out in the storm to find Cap and they safely make it to the nursing home to help clear out Ruth and the other residents. Reid tells Sheriff Brigman that Kit called him the night of Randall's car accident. ——————————————— Throughout the episode, we see flashbacks from Reid from the night of Randall's accident including Reid using a gun to shoot empty beer bottles while he and Tim "wait for Randall." In another, Tim and Reid take the truck to the garage but end up taking it elsewhere to "dump it."
8	8	"The Bad Seed"	Michael Offer	April Blair & Joe Fazzio	April 17, 2025
Kit is arrested. Lauren's dad will not allow her to go to the cheer clinic or UT because she is dating Lucas. Yancy wants to make things right with Ellie and she tells him to start by telling Cap the truth. Reid checks on Lucas and tells him what happened with Kit and the truck. Lauren sneaks out to attend the cheer clinic at UT. The water in the wells on the ranches have all been deemed "brackish" - just as Paula Jo planned. Sheriff Brigman questions Kit about the accident but specific details are inaccurate, which the Sheriff finds suspicious. At a town hall, Reid plays audio of his mom confessing to the fake well water reports. Davis tells Cap about Yancy and later, Cap throws Yancy out. Paula Jo and Davis have sex.
9	9	"About Forever"	Amanda Marsalis	Paul Haapaniemi	April 17, 2025
Quinn spends the night with Staten and he asks her to end it with Davis. Quinn agrees but lets it slip to Staten that Davis is broke. Staten visits Davis to propose a merger, and ceasefire, for Reid, and he accepts. Sheriff Brigman visits his wife, Margaret, and asks her about the night of the accident. She confesses that she was the one driving the truck that night, not Kit. Reid gives Lucas emancipation papers so he isn't left in the custody of CPS. Sheriff Brigman makes amends with Lauren by making a call to UT and allowing her to date Lucas. Once again, Katherine asks Quinn to audition but Quinn tells her that she promised Amalah she would "take care of her boys" and that is why she stayed in Ransom. Lucas visits Kit in jail and asks him to tell him the truth but he continues to cover for Margaret. Lauren finds out her mother caused the accident. Davis goes behind Staten's back and poaches his biggest buyer. Quinn auditions for Katherine and is offered the job. After Cap doesn't show for lunch with Ellie, Ellie and Yancy go out looking for him. Lauren falls out of a stunt and is injured during the pep rally. The next morning, Yancy finds Cap dead.
10	10	"Maybe It's Time Yancy Grey Dies Too"	Amanda Marsalis	Story by : April Blair & Joe Fazzio & Paul Haapaniemi; Teleplay by : Paul Haapaniemi	April 17, 2025
Ellie takes the news of Cap's death hard. Austin Water and Power sue Quinn, and the dance hall, for their initial investment of $80,000. Lauren refuses to see Lucas. Quinn ends things with Davis amicably. Ellie and Yancy hold a memorial for Cap and everyone shows up to pay their respects. Staten tells Yancy that Cap tried finding him and his mother all those years ago and regretted the way he treated Yancy; but never got the chance to tell him. Staten encourages Yancy to embrace being a Fuller. Lauren tells her dad that she knows what happened and wants him to do what is right. Yancy decides to keep the Fuller ranch and proposes to Ellie but she wants to think about it. Stanley tells Staten he is contesting the ranch's trust. Quinn decides to take the job in New York to help the dance hall and makes Ellie a partner. A woman claiming to be Yancy's wife shows up at the dance hall. After purposely provoking Staten to hit him, Davis and Stanley now have physical proof that Staten is unstable to be in charge of the ranch. Margaret is arrested and Kit is released. Quinn and Staten's relationship is left in limbo.

=== Season 2 (2026) ===
No. overall	No. in season	Title	Directed by	Written by	Original release date
11	1	"Hey There, Cowboy"	Mo McRae	April Blair	July 23, 2026
12	2	"Edge of My Seat Here, Quinn"	Melanie Mayron	Paul Haapaniemi	July 23, 2026
13	3	"That Dog Won't Hurt"	Melanie Mayron	Amanda Johnson-Zetterström	July 23, 2026
14	4	"Forever and Always"	Wendey Stanzler	Adam Milch	July 23, 2026
15	5	"That Leaves Two"	Wendey Stanzler	Joe Fazzio	July 23, 2026
16	6	"Can't Never Could"	Michael Offer	Kelli Breslin	July 23, 2026
17	7	"No Place Like Home"	Michael Offer	Neil Reynolds & Paul Haapaniemi	July 23, 2026
18	8	"Love Is A Canyon"	Michael Offer	April Blair	July 23, 2026

== Production ==
Netflix gave the series a 10-episode order in December 2023. April Blair created the series and is writer and executive producer, alongside Dan Angel. The series is adapted from the Jodi Thomas book series. Amanda Marsalis directed the first two episodes.

The cast is led by Josh Duhamel and Minka Kelly, with James Brolin, Lizzy Greene and Eoin Macken. In January 2024, the cast was announced to have 13 additions including Marianly Tejada, Jack Schumacher, Garrett Wareing and Andrew Liner with Philip Winchester as a guest star. Meta Golding joined the cast in April 2024.

Filming locations included Albuquerque, New Mexico (including Albuquerque Studios), Santa Fe, and Las Vegas between February and June 2024.

In June 2025, Netflix renewed the series for a second season. In August 2025, Casey W. Johnson was promoted as a series regular for the second season. In September 2025, Macken and Liner are not returning as series regulars for the second season. In November 2025, Steve Howey joined the cast in a recurring capacity for the second season.

In September 2026, the series was canceled after two seasons.

== Release ==
The series premiered on Netflix in the United States on April 17, 2025. The second season premiered on July 23, 2026.

== Reception ==
=== Critical response ===
The review aggregator website Rotten Tomatoes reported a 45% approval rating based on 20 critic reviews. The website's critics consensus reads, "Inviting one too many unflattering comparisons to more compelling dramas, Ransom Canyon is a serviceable binge for fans of rustic soap operas but a middling example of the genre." Metacritic, which uses a weighted average, assigned a score of 58 out of 100 based on 11 critics, indicating "mixed or average" reviews.

=== Viewership ===
According to data from Showlabs, Ransom Canyon ranked third on Netflix in the United States during the week of 14–20 April 2025.
