= Chibuikem Uche =

British actor

Chibuikem Uche is a British–Nigerian actor best known for his role as Cooper Clay in the Peacock teen drama One of Us Is Lying. He has also appeared in American Housewife, All American, and the feature film The Tomorrow War.

== Early life and education ==
Born in London to Nigerian parents, Uche moved to Connecticut with his family at the age of eight. Before pursuing acting, he studied mathematics and worked in the field of actuarial science.

== Career ==
Uche's first significant onscreen role came in American Housewife, where he appeared as André. He gained wider recognition portraying Cooper Clay in Peacock's teen mystery series One of Us Is Lying, based on the novel by Karen M. McManus. His performance as a closeted high school baseball star navigating identity and suspicion earned him critical notice.

Uche continued to build his career with a supporting role as Lt. Ikemba in The Tomorrow War, a high-concept sci-fi film. He also guest-starred in shows such as East New York and All American, further establishing his presence in American television.

== Filmography ==
=== Film ===
Year	Title	Role	Notes
2021	The Tomorrow War	Lt. Ikemba	
TBA	You Don't Belong Here		

=== Television ===
Year	Title	Role	Notes
2020–2021	American Housewife	Andre	5 episodes
2021–2022	One of Us Is Lying	Cooper Clay	Main cast (Season 1 & 2)
2023	East New York	Terrell Booker Jr.	1 episode
2024	All American	Ashely	2 Episodes
2025	The Rookie	Sean Larson	1 episode
2025	Paradise	Young Fred Collins	1 episode
2026	The Night Agent	American agent	Season 3 Episode 1: "Call Waiting"
2026	A Different World	Kojo Achebe	Main Cast
