= Eli Goree =

Canadian actor (born 1994)

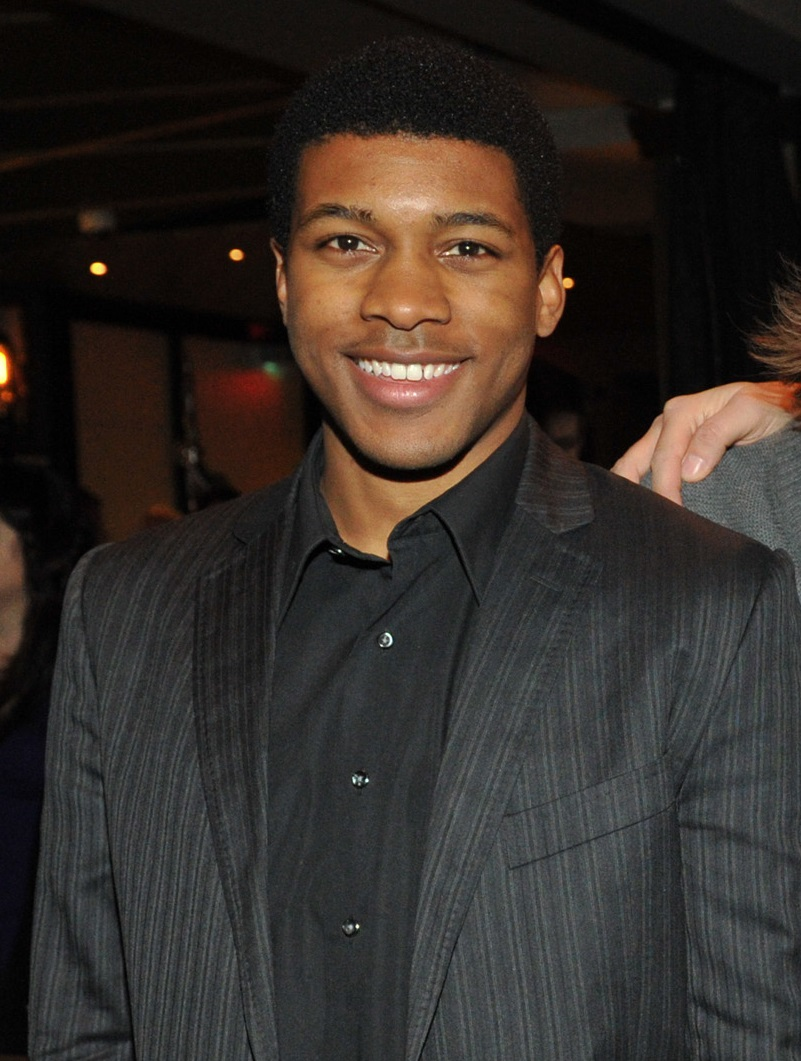
- Goree in 2011
- Born: May 26, 1994 (age 32); Halifax, Nova Scotia, Canada
- Occupation: Actor
- Years active: 2000–present
- Known for: The 100, Riverdale

Eli Goree (born May 26, 1994) is a Canadian actor. He is best known for his roles as Quincy in HBO's Ballers, Malik in Da Kink in My Hair (2007–2009), Wells Jaha in the post-apocalyptic drama show The 100 (2014–2017), Joel Goodson in the supernatural horror show Dead of Summer, and Cassius Clay in Regina King's biographical drama film One Night in Miami... (2020). In 2018, he started a recurring role on the CW's TV series Riverdale, where he plays Munroe "Mad Dog" Moore.

== Biography ==
Goree grew up in Halifax, Nova Scotia. He was raised by a single mother. He began his acting career at age six in Sesame Park, the Canadian version of Sesame Street. In 2003, he hosted The Big Black Rap Show on the Dalhousie University campus radio station CKDU-FM. In 2006, he became one of the hosts for the last season of the CBC TV series Street Cents. In the same year, he also began working as a freelancing journalist for Canada Now.

Goree is a graduate of Prince Andrew High School.

From 2007 to 2009, he was cast as Malik in popular Global TV series Da Kink in My Hair. He also appeared in the Vision TV series Soul.

On stage, Goree played the lead role of Jake in the 2009 critically acclaimed play Secrets of a Black Boy.

Between 2010 and 2013, he appeared in the mockumentary Pure Pwnage as well as guest roles in The CW's fantasy horror series Supernatural, The CW's medical drama Emily Owens, M.D., Showcase's sci-fi miniseries Eve of Destruction and CTV's police crime drama Motive.

In 2014, he was cast as Wells Jaha, one of the main characters in the first season of The CW's post-apocalyptic drama show The 100.

His first significant role in a feature film was in the 2016 sports-drama film Race.

Goree played Joel, one of the main characters in the Freeform horror drama Dead of Summer.

He appeared as Conner, an amputee war veteran, in the Amazon Prime Video science fiction series The Peripheral.

== Filmography ==
=== Film ===
Year	Title	Roles
2014	Godzilla	PO No. 3
2016	Race	Dave Albritton
2020	One Night in Miami...	Cassius Clay
2021	The Guilty	Rick (voice)

=== Television ===
Year	Title	Roles	Notes
2006	North/South	Tyson	Unknown episodes
2006	Enough	Dakota	Television short
2009	Soul	Samson	4 episodes
2009	Flashpoint	Jermaine	Episode: "Aisle 13"
2009	Da Kink in My Hair	Malik	13 episodes
2010	Pure Pwnage	Tyrel	6 episodes
2012	Supernatural	Marcus	Episode: "The Born-Again Identity"
2012	Abducted: The Carlina White Story	Carl Tyson 1987	Television film
2012–2013	Emily Owens, M.D.	Intern Bowman	4 episodes
2013	Eve of Destruction	Madhatter53	2 episodes
2013	Motive	Graeme the Caretaker	Episode: "Fallen Angel"
2014	Far From Home	Rudy	Television film
2014	The 100	Wells Jaha	Main (season 1), guest (season 2); 5 episodes
2015	Christmas Truce	Jensen	Television film
2016	Toni Braxton: Unbreak My Heart	Darryl Simmons	Television film
2016	Heartbeat	Thomas	Episode: "Pilot"
2016	Legends of Tomorrow	James Jackson	Episode: "Last Refuge"
2016	Dead of Summer	Joel Goodson	Main, 9 episodes
2018	GLOW	Ernest Dawson	Episode: "Mother of All Matches"
2018	Ballers	Quincy Carter	Recurring (season 4); 6 episodes
2018–2020	Riverdale	Munroe "Mad Dog" Moore	Recurring (season 3–4); 13 episodes
2019	Pearson	Derrick Mayes	Television show
2022	The Peripheral	Conner Penske	Main

== Awards and nominations ==
Year	Award	Category	Work	Result	Ref
2006	Gemini Awards	Best Youth Non Fiction Series	Street Cents	Nominated	
2009	Gemini Awards	Best Ensamble Cast	Da Kink In My Hair	Nominated	
2009	Young Artist Awards	Best Actor in a TV Series	Soul	Nominated	
2016	UBCP/ACTRA Awards	Best Actor	Race	Nominated	
2017	Leo Award	Best Supporting Performance by a Male in a Motion Picture	Race	Won	
2021	Screen Actors Guild Awards	Outstanding Performance by a Cast in a Motion Picture	One Night in Miami...	Nominated	
