= One of Us Is Lying (TV series) =

2021 American teen drama mystery television series

- Genre: Teen drama; Mystery; Thriller
- Based on: One of Us Is Lying by Karen M. McManus
- Developed by: Erica Saleh
- Showrunners: Darío Madrona; Erica Saleh
- Starring: Annalisa Cochrane; Chibuikem Uche; Marianly Tejada; Cooper van Grootel; Barrett Carnahan; Jessica McLeod; Mark McKenna; Melissa Collazo; Sara Thompson; Alimi Ballard
- Composer: Ian Hultquist
- Country of origin: United States
- Original language: English
- No. of seasons: 2
- No. of episodes: 16

Production
- Executive producers: Jennifer Morrison; Erica Saleh; John Sacchi; Matt Groesch; Darío Madrona
- Producer: Brian Leslie Parker
- Cinematography: Sharone Meir; Cameron Duncan; D.J. Stipsen; David A. Makin
- Editors: Scott Draper; James Kilton; Gaston Jaren Lopez; Nancy Morrison; Nick Towle; Kelly Soll
- Camera setup: Multi-camera
- Running time: 44–52 minutes
- Production companies: 5MM; Universal Content Productions

Original release
- Network: Peacock
- Release: October 7, 2021 – October 20, 2022

One of Us Is Lying is an American teen drama mystery television series developed by Erica Saleh. The series is based on the 2017 novel of the same name by Karen M. McManus and follows five high school students who enter detention, where one of them dies under suspicious circumstances and an investigation ensues. It stars Mark McKenna as Simon, the deceased student, and Annalisa Cochrane, Chibuikem Uche, Marianly Tejada, and Cooper van Grootel as the main suspects, with Barrett Carnahan, Jessica McLeod, and Melissa Collazo, Sara Thompson and Alimi Ballard in supporting roles.

The series premiered on Peacock on October 7, 2021, and was met with generally positive reviews from critics. In January 2022, the series was renewed for a second season which premiered on October 20, 2022. In January 2023, the series was canceled after two seasons.

== Premise ==
=== Season 1 ===
At Bayview High, five students – Simon, Addy, Cooper, Bronwyn, and Nate – are given detention. Simon, known for starting an online gossip group called About That with his friend Janae to snitch on his classmates, suffers a fatal allergic reaction. Each student had a motive to kill Simon, and after it is determined his death was not an accident, an investigation is started. An anonymous user reveals the group's secrets on About That, and they try to work together to find the killer. They, along with Janae, later determine Addy's ex-boyfriend, Jake, killed Simon, but they accidentally shoot him.

=== Season 2 ===
A user called "Simon Says" tells Addy, Cooper, Bronwyn, Nate, and Janae that they must do as they say or a video proving they killed Jake will be sent to the police. Simon Says makes various demands as the group tries to figure out their identity. When they deduce that "Simon Says" is Fiona, Nate's tutor, she demands they hand over Addy, who pulled the gun's trigger and killed Jake. The group frame Fiona for Jake's murder, and she dies in jail.

== Cast ==
=== Main ===
- Annalisa Cochrane as Adelaide "Addy" Prentiss, a popular cheerleader
- Chibuikem Uche as Cooper Clay, a closeted baseball pitcher with a promising career
- Marianly Tejada as Bronwyn Rojas, an overachiever focused on her future
- Cooper van Grootel as Nate Macauley, a student and drug dealer on probation
- Barrett Carnahan as Jake Riordan, the captain of the football team and Addy's boyfriend
- Jessica McLeod as Janae Matthews, Simon's best friend
- Mark McKenna as Simon Kelleher, the creator of an online gossip group who dies during detention via his peanut allergy. (season 1, guest season 2)
- Melissa Collazo as Maeve Rojas, Bronwyn's younger sister
- Sara Thompson as Vanessa Clark, Addy's best friend and TJ's girlfriend (season 2, recurring season 1)
- Alimi Ballard as Kevin Clay, Cooper's father and coach (season 2, recurring season 1)

=== Recurring ===
- Zenia Marshall as Keely Moore, Cooper's girlfriend
- George Ferrier as TJ Forrester, Jake's best friend who has a crush on Addy
- Martin Bobb-Semple as Evan Neiman, Bronwyn's boyfriend
- Karim Diané as Kris Greene, Cooper's secret boyfriend
- Jacque Drew as Detective Laura Wheeler
- Valerie Cruz as Isabella Rojas, Bronwyn and Maeve's mother
- Hugo Ateo as Javier Rojas, Bronwyn and Maeve's father (season 1)
- Miles J. Harvey as Lucas Clay, Cooper's younger brother (season 1)
- Ali Liebert as Ann Prentiss, Addy's mother
- Purva Bedi as Principal Gupta
- Andi Crown as Ms. Avery, an AP Physics teacher at Bayview High (season 1)
- Errol Shand as Brad Macauley, Nate's father (season 1)
- Aidee Walker as Ellen Macauley, Nate's mother
- Joe Witkowski as Cole Riordan, Jake's brother (season 2)
- Doralynn Mui as Fiona Jennings, a new student at Bayview (season 2, guest season 1)
- Emma Jenkins-Purro as Giselle Ward (season 2)

== Episodes ==
| Season | Episodes | Originally released | |
| Season | Episodes | First released | Last released |
|---|---|---|---|
| 1 | 8 | October 7, 2021 | October 21, 2021 |
| 2 | 8 | October 20, 2022 | |

=== Season 1 (2021) ===
| No. overall | No. in season | Title | Directed by | Teleplay by | Original release date |
|---|---|---|---|---|---|
| 1 | 1 | "Pilot" | Jennifer Morrison | Erica Saleh | October 7, 2021 |
Simon is a high school student known for creating About That, an online gossip group where he releases personal and revealing information about his classmates. At the beginning of a new school year, five students—Simon, Addy, Cooper, Bronwyn, and Nate—are given detention. After drinking a cup of water, Simon suffers a sudden and fatal allergic reaction. Nate notices that Bronwyn has stolen Simon's laptop, and when he confronts her about it, Bronwyn later puts it in the trunk of her car. The following morning, the four students are introduced to Officer Miller, who has initiated an investigation into Simon's death, which was a result of a peanut allergy that spawned when traces of peanut oil were inserted into the cup he was drinking from. Nate encourages Bronwyn to return the laptop. Cooper talks with his brother Lucas and expresses his struggles with coming out. Nate, who is on probation, continues to sell drugs. The next day, Addy begins taking medication to deal with the stress as a result of Simon's death, and leaves a small pool party with Jake, Cooper, Keely, TJ and Vanessa, to take it, to which Jake's best friend, TJ, comes in to check on her. Addy's secret is that she is cheating on Jake with TJ, who is her best friend Vanessa's boyfriend. At night, a memorial service is held for Simon where his best friend Janae sings "Fuck You" by Lily Allen. On About That, an anonymous user confesses to murdering Simon. Later, Bronwyn discovers that Simon's laptop is missing from her trunk.
| 2 | 2 | "One of Us Is Grieving" | John S. Scott | Molly Nussbaum | October 7, 2021 |
While Cooper's girlfriend Keely knows he is gay, his secret is that he has a confidential relationship with Kris, a college freshman. At school, Detective Wheeler is permitted to search the lockers belonging to Addy, Cooper, Bronwyn, and Nate. After finding a substance containing peanut oil in Addy's locker, Wheeler confirms that the four students are now suspects in a murder investigation. At night, Kris learns that Cooper is still in high school and confronts him for lying about being in college; they continue seeing each other after a discussion. The following day, the four students conclude that someone set them up and attend an event at Simon's house. There, Jake steals Simon's Xbox, and Addy tells the rest of the group that she overheard Wheeler mention the possibility that all four of them worked together to murder Simon. On About That, the anonymous user reveals Addy cheated on Jake, and it is revealed Bronwyn's younger sister Maeve took Simon's laptop.
| 3 | 3 | "One of Us Is Not Like the Others" | John S. Scott | Dayna Lynne North & Harrison David Rivers | October 7, 2021 |
Jake breaks up with Addy and starts a fight with TJ. On About That, the anonymous user reveals Nate once sold drugs to an intoxicated student who almost died from an overdose. At home, Bronwyn discovers that Maeve was friends with Simon. On About That, the anonymous user incorrectly says Cooper has been doping. At school, TJ is suspended after Addy lies that he started the fight. Bronwyn confronts Maeve, who says she was trying to stop her secret from coming out. Failing to do so, the anonymous user on About That reveals Bronwyn cheated on her chemistry exam. The following morning, Addy tells Bronwyn that she stole Janae's phone and discovered text messages in which Janae encouraged Simon to delete About That. Later, Jake confirms to Addy that their relationship is over. At home, Maeve tells Bronwyn that Simon broke her heart when he began ghosting her. After spraining his shoulder, Cooper purchases illicit painkillers from Nate. In a flashback, Simon tells Cooper his plans on outing him; Cooper replies by calling Simon a "sad, pathetic bully". At a baseball game, Kris breaks up with Cooper after seeing him kiss Keely.
| 4 | 4 | "One of Us Is Famous" | Sophia Takal | Erica Saleh | October 14, 2021 |
The murder investigation becomes national news in part due to Simon being the mayor's son. Bronwyn's boyfriend Evan tells her not to worry. Cooper takes a drug test and is confronted by his father Kevin Clay when the results show he has been taking painkillers. Together, the four students decide to make Janae a suspect but fail to do so. At home, Maeve shows Bronwyn that someone changed Cooper's secret on About That before it was released. In a flashback, it is revealed Janae was the intoxicated student Nate sold drugs to. Finding her unconscious, Nate was able to save her from overdosing. In the present, Kevin suffers a heart attack, Cooper comes out as gay to the group, and the anonymous user on About That reveals the group has been holding private meetings. As a result, Evan and Bronwyn break up and the police obtain warrants to search the homes of the four students but find nothing. At night, Bronwyn and Nate destroy Simon's laptop, and Maeve sends a hard drive to the police department. In a flashback, Simon threatens Nate with ruining his life. Back home, Nate is met with the unexpected return of his mother.
| 5 | 5 | "One of Us Is Cracking" | Sophia Takal | Daniel Pearle | October 14, 2021 |
Detective Wheeler shows Bronwyn a video from Simon's hard drive where they appear to be fighting. Addy and Cooper grow suspicious of Bronwyn and Nate for not telling them they had Simon's laptop. Kevin tells Cooper that he is proud of him for keeping his sexuality a secret. Later, Kris and Cooper begin talking again. Nate is advised to move in with his mother because of his arrest history. On About That, the anonymous user releases the video of the fight between Bronwyn and Simon. Meanwhile, Addy connects several pieces of evidence and holds Janae at knifepoint, accusing her of being the anonymous user; Janae admits to revealing the group's secrets while also changing Cooper's secret to avoid outing him but says she did not post the videos of the group meeting or Bronwyn's fight with Simon. A flashback reveals Bronwyn threatened to murder Simon after she discovered he was receiving sexually explicit pictures from Maeve. In the present, Cooper reveals to Kris that he moved out of his home state after he was arrested for a fight he did not start. At night, Addy is chased down by an unseen stranger before running into Nate.
| 6 | 6 | "One of Us Is Dancing!" | Benjamin Semanoff | Rick Montano & Vincent Ingrao | October 14, 2021 |
At the school's homecoming, Janae and Addy express their belief that TJ murdered Simon. Bronwyn and Nate discover that TJ and Simon had an altercation on the day of the latter's death but only Simon received detention. Meanwhile, Keely reveals she is the one who leaked Addy's cheating to Simon, and she and Cooper break up. After TJ catches Addy trying to steal his phone, Maeve investigates Addy's locker and finds an EpiPen which the group destroys. They conclude TJ is not the murderer. Several flashbacks reveal Janae and Simon both had feelings for Maeve. When Simon made the first move, an intoxicated Janae bought drugs from Nate. Simon later ghosted Maeve and apologized to Janae. In the present, Janae confesses her feelings to Maeve, and the pair kiss. The rest of the group catches Vanessa taking pictures of them. Instead of leaving, they decide to celebrate their last homecoming. TJ tells Addy that he gave Simon revealing information about their teacher Ms. Avery, someone who the group had previously suspected. Detective Wheeler enters the school and arrests Nate for Simon's murder. Outside, a police officer finds several EpiPens hidden in Nate's motorcycle.
| 7 | 7 | "One of Us Is Not Giving Up" | Ben Semanoff | Molly Nussbaum & Anthony Johnston | October 21, 2021 |
Nate is encouraged to take a plea deal convicting him of involuntary manslaughter to avoid a possible life sentence. The rest of the group catches Ms. Avery secretly meeting with Vanessa, who reveals she had an abortion. Ms. Avery admits her secret was breaking school policy to help Vanessa have the abortion without her parents' consent. In a flashback, Simon tells Ms. Avery that he will not reveal her secret if she gives Addy, Cooper, Bronwyn, and Nate detention. In the present, the group remembers Ms. Avery left them alone with Simon on the first day of school to confront several pranksters who were streaking, giving her an alibi. The group learns the streakers were anonymously paid to perform the prank and concludes Simon committed suicide. The group tells their theory to Detective Wheeler, who says the investigators already ruled out suicide as a cause of Simon's death. At night, Bronwyn writes a personal statement for Yale University admitting she cheated on her chemistry exam. She tells her parents she is in love with Nate and wants to help him. Meanwhile, Addy gets back together with Jake and discovers he was chatting with Simon before he died.
| 8 | 8 | "One of Us Is Dead" | John S. Scott | Darío Madrona | October 21, 2021 |
Bronwyn uses the money she was saving for college to help Nate post bail. Together, the group confronts Jake about his text messages with Simon. Jake claims he was chatting with a random user looking for information about his classmates. Several flashbacks reveal Jake knew Addy was cheating on him and that Jake helped Simon plan a suicide attempt in which Jake would rescue him. In the present, the group attends a Halloween party held at Jake's house to investigate. Addy betrays Jake and steals back Simon's Xbox. Jake pulls out a gun and chases her into the woods. Cooper arrives but is spotted by Jake, who holds him and Addy at gunpoint. Jake reveals he wanted to frame Addy by foiling Simon's suicide attempt because he wanted to kill the "genius who really believed he could play me". Janae shows up and hits Jake with a bat. The four of them battle for the gun. Bronwyn and Nate arrive as Jake is shot and killed. Two weeks later, the news is reporting Jake ran away after being outed for his involvement but Vanessa and many others remain skeptical. At school, Addy, Cooper, Bronwyn, Nate, and Janae simultaneously receive text messages from a user named "Simon Says" who knows they killed Jake.

=== Season 2 (2022) ===
| No. overall | No. in season | Title | Directed by | Written by | Original release date |
|---|---|---|---|---|---|
| 9 | 1 | "Simon Says Game On!" | Michael Weaver | Erica Saleh | October 20, 2022 |
After receiving the text from Simon Says, Bronwyn, Nate, Addy, Cooper, and Janae—dubbed "Murder Club"—agree to ignore it. Nate decides to move out of his house after coming home to find his mother furiously drinking. In an attempt to restore the school's good name, Principal Gupta has Nate start tutoring with Fiona, the girl Simon revealed to have stabbed her teacher for unknown reasons. The next day, Simon Says sends Addy the gun they used to kill Jake; Janae tells her she will get rid of it but keeps it instead. Simon Says tells the group to meet at the Hollywood Cinema, their old meetup spot, where they find name tags for each of them on the front row seat. In a deepfake video, Simon tells the group that they want them to pay for hurting Jake. If Murder Club do not listen to Simon Says, a video from Halloween night, proving they were in the woods the night Jake disappeared, will be sent to the police. Later, Addy has a hallucination of Jake.
| 10 | 2 | "Simon Says Tick Tock" | Michael Weaver | Jan Oxenberg | October 20, 2022 |
Addy is still haunted by her hallucination of Jake. Simon Says asks the five to bring Jake's watch, which he was wearing the night he died. Janae reveals that his body is in the freezer on her parents' yacht. Addy then admits she pulled the trigger that killed Jake and offers to turn herself in, but the rest of the group agrees that it is too late. After the group retrieves the watch, Simon Says tells one of them to wear it. Cooper puts the watch on, but takes it off later. As punishment, Simon Says sends a photo of Jake with the watch to Vanessa, who raises suspicion about why Cooper now has the watch. The five decide to attend Vanessa's #JusticeForJake rally to figure out who sent her the photo. After learning that Maeve knows what is happening, Janae apologizes to her, and the two kiss. Maeve tricks Vanessa into revealing the username of the person who sent her the photo, but the information is not useful. Meanwhile, Addy has an outburst where she asks Jake not to come home, drawing significant attention to the group. Cole, Jake's brother, gives the watch to Wheeler.
| 11 | 3 | "Simon Says Let's Get Personal" | Shannon Kohli | Molly Nussbaum | October 20, 2022 |
Simon Says's demands become personal as each Murder Club member receive different orders: Bronwyn to skip her midterm exam; Nate to kiss Fiona at lunch; Addy to wear a black dress to school; Cooper to post on Instagram that he has received a text from Jake; and Janae to graffiti Simon's grave. The kiss causes tensions between Bronwyn and Nate; unbeknownst to Bronwyn, he later kisses Fiona again. Cooper's phone is taken by Wheeler to investigate the text he claims to have received. Janae is caught while graffitiing Simon's grave, leading her parents to return home. Murder Club subsequently dispose of Jake's body in the ocean. Janae opens up to Addy about being genderfluid. Meanwhile, Vanessa introduces her followers to Giselle, who claims to have dated Jake over the summer. Addy speaks to Giselle and comes to a conclusion that she did know Jake.
| 12 | 4 | "Simon Says Gotcha!" | Shannon Kohli | Anthony Johnston | October 20, 2022 |
Murder Club works to find the truth about Giselle, who they suspect to be Simon Says. Simon Says tells Addy to smash Giselle's car, and she is suspended as a result. Nate is told to steal all the money from the cashier at Victor's (where he works). Janae is told to plug a USB into a school computer, which causes pornography to show on the rest of the computers; Maeve uses a timer Simon Says put on Janae's phone in an attempt to track them down. Vanessa leads a search at the woods where Jake was killed, at which Giselle finds a bullet casing. At Giselle's motel room, Nate and Bronwyn find the money he stole and conclude she must be Simon Says. Maeve finds she can send messages to Simon Says and claims they are Giselle. Murder Club later find Giselle dead.
| 13 | 5 | "Simon Says Ho Ho Ho!" | Roxanne Benjamin | Rick Montano & Vincent Ingrao | October 20, 2022 |
Murder Club decide to turn themselves in at midnight. Bronwyn lies to her parents and tells them she has been accepted into Yale when in fact she has not opened her acceptance email. During the night, she decides to face her biggest fear and sings karaoke. She and Nate later have sex during which she tells him she was not accepted into Yale. Cooper, Janae, and Addy go to a warehouse party, where he reunites with Kris. Addy wants to solely take the blame for Jake's death, but Janae convinces her otherwise. Meanwhile, Maeve attempts to learn more about Simon Says through the USB Janae had and finds that it was a virus. At midnight, Murder Club learn TJ has been arrested for Giselle's murder.
| 14 | 6 | "Simon Says You Better Pray" | Roxanne Benjamin | Kyle Warren | October 20, 2022 |
After learning of TJ's arrest, Vanessa begins investigating Murder Club. Simon Says threatens to reveal her relationship with Evan if she does not stop investigating. After Cole tells her that Jake was in rehab during the summer and did actually kill Simon, she finds herself lost. A priest tells her to start from the beginning and let the truth guide her. She begins to go through pictures of Halloween, finding Bronwyn, Nate, Janae, and someone in a bear costume who she thinks is Maeve were at the party. Afterwards, she and Keely speak with Zach, the latter's ex-boyfriend, who reveals he saw Cooper's car tailing Jake's. Vanessa, Evan, and Keely follow a path that ends at a cliff, where Vanessa finds Jake's license plate. A photo of Vanessa and Evan kissing is posted on Instagram, but she is unfazed. Vanessa agrees to appear on a local talk show to reveal where she found the license plate, but Simon Says threatens to kill her if she does. On the day of Vanessa's interview, Evan finds she is missing from her dressing room.
| 15 | 7 | "Simon Says Time Out" | Ben Semanoff | Molly Nussbaum & Corey Dashaun | October 20, 2022 |
Vanessa wakes up in the back of a trunk and its later revealed that Murder Club were her kidnappers, doing so to figure out why TJ was arrested and prevent Simon Says from reaching her. They confess to killing Jake, and she agrees to help them. Maeve and Kris later arrive after she traces Janae's text messages. Vanessa reveals that Jake was in rehab; Murder Club deduces that it was an emotional wellness rehab called Wild Awakenings. After the talk show's host hands over the license plate, Jake's body is found. Vanessa meets with Wheeler and asks her to look into the rehab. Bronwyn, Maeve, and Janae go to Wild Awakenings, where they find Fiona went to rehab with Jake. Fiona discovers Murder Club are soon going to realize she is Simon Says. She then asks Nate for help with a delivery.
| 16 | 8 | "Simon Says Game Over" | Ben Semanoff | Erica Saleh & Rick Montano & Vincent Ingrao | October 20, 2022 |
After being outed as Simon Says, Fiona asks for the person who killed Jake. The group decides to find evidence that Fiona killed Giselle instead of handing Addy over. When they fail to find any, they decide to frame her for Jake's death by planting his hair on her bear costume; uploading a hard drive of Simon's laptop onto her dad's computer; and putting the gun in her car. Maeve mentions that the gun lacks Fiona's fingerprints, and she has a video of the five in the woods, but they dismiss her. While on Janae's yacht with Addy, Maeve reveals she took the gun. She gives it to Fiona, who deletes the video. Fiona unsuccessfully attempts to kill Addy; Maeve reveals it was a ploy to get Fiona's fingerprints on the gun and delete the video. Fiona then sets the boat on fire. Murder Club hurry to help and escape the boat, but Cooper is gravely injured. Bronwyn chases Fiona but is stabbed before the police save her. They express resentment towards Maeve. Fiona is arrested and subsequently dies in prison. Later, Nate gives Bronwyn a necklace. On graduation day, another disaster occurs, and Bronwyn's necklace is collected as evidence.

== Production ==
=== Development ===
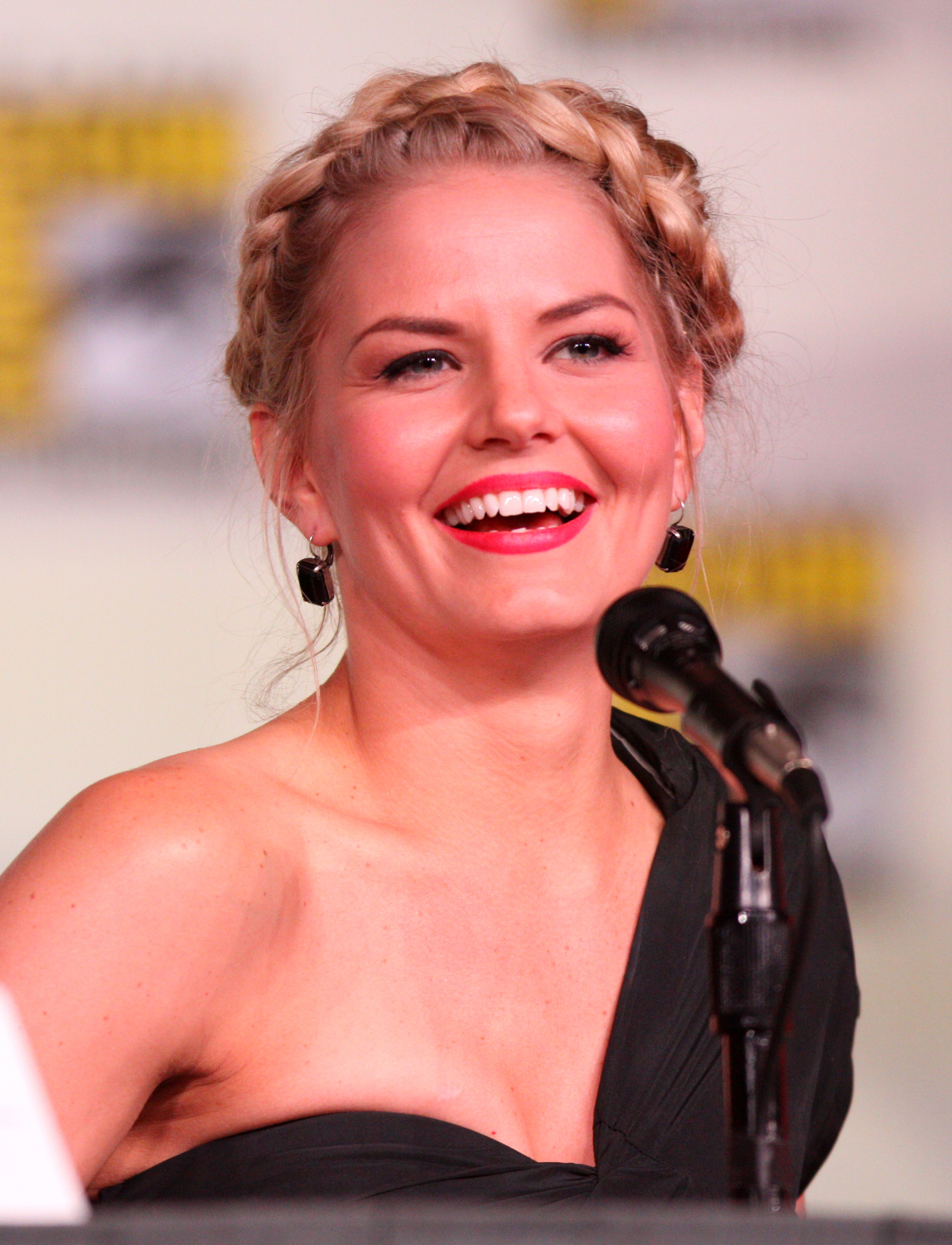
Jennifer Morrison directed the pilot of One of Us Is Lying

In September 2017, Universal Cable Productions reportedly acquired the rights to One of Us Is Lying—the debut novel of Karen M. McManus—in a competitive situation and would produce a television series adaptation to be released on E!. In August 2019, the project was moved to NBCUniversal, who gave the then-unreleased streaming service Peacock its first pilot order with the series.

Following the success of his Spanish Netflix series Elite, Darío Madrona received several offers to work on American television series; one such offer was for One of Us Is Lying. Madrona thought the show would provide something "a little brighter" than traditional mystery stories and found the novel "super addictive"—he was also intrigued by the flawed and untruthful characters, and saw the project as a chance to explore more profound themes of friendship, love and want. After accepting the offer, Madrona met with the producers and studio and was hired as showrunner.

In September 2019, it was reported that Jennifer Morrison would direct the pilot episode. On August 12, 2020, the project became the first from Peacock to receive a series order. On January 14, 2022, Peacock renewed the series for a second season, with Saleh replacing Madrona as showrunner.

=== Writing and adaptation ===
While McManus was not involved in outlining the season, she was given the opportunity to review scripts. McManus stated that her main objective was to keep her characters' "emotional cores" intact. In an interview, Madrona was asked if the series would stay faithful to its source material; he responded by saying, "We've been faithful to the spirit of the story and the themes and the characters, but also trying to add some little twists and turns here and there so we can surprise readers of the book." Madrona found the idea of a single season that tells a complete story while solving the show's biggest mystery very satisfying. He also claimed that after a season, viewers often lost interest in a show and stopped watching. Because of this, the series reveals who killed Simon, but many other questions are left unanswered at the end of the first season.

The second season deviated from its source material. According to Saleh, the crew were eager to write about the show's characters again and continue the first season's narrative. She did not want to adapt the second book because it stars a different cast of characters, and the team wanted to carry on exploring the original characters. Saleh found it both "exciting and freeing" and "a little nerve-wracking" to write the second season without the novels as a blueprint for the plot. Since the writers knew their audience enjoyed the books and their characters, they wanted to make sure they were "really continuing to deliver on the heart of the characters that [McManus] created". While the first season focuses on themes of living honestly and breaking away from stereotypes, the second emphasises the consequences of doing so.

=== Casting ===
In October 2019, Marianly Tejada, Cooper van Grootel, Annalisa Cochrane, Chibuikem Uche, Jessica McLeod, Barrett Carnahan, and Melissa Collazo were announced as part of the cast. In 2021, Mark McKenna was confirmed as a series regular in July; Martin Bobb-Semple, Karim Diané, George Ferrier, Miles J. Harvey, Zenia Marshall, and Sara Thompson were announced as part of the recurring cast in August; and Alimi Ballard was confirmed in October. In May 2022, Joe Witkowski and Doralynn Mui joined the cast in recurring roles for the second season.

=== Filming ===
Filming for the pilot took place in Vancouver, Canada—from November 2 to November 20, 2019. Scenes were shot at several local sites, including Central Park; Blenheim Street; West 53rd Avenue; and a parking lot on Boundary Road. Due to the COVID-19 pandemic, the crew had difficulties restarting production. They decided to film the rest of the show in New Zealand. According to producer Matt Groesch, the beaches on the country's east coast provided an excellent match to those in Southern California. The crew visited many locations, such as Auckland, the North Shore, and Waiwera. Groesch had to figure out a method to replicate the high school setting in Auckland as they had previously been shot elsewhere in the pilot. Several locations were used, including the AUT Millennium and the ASB Showgrounds. The team used Rangitoto College as the backdrop for Bayview High's rival school. The remaining seven episodes started shooting on May 10, 2021. Due to a COVID-19 lockdown, the last few days of production shifted to Ontario, Canada. Filming concluded in late September 2021. Production returned to New Zealand for the second season.

=== Cancelation ===
On January 20, 2023, Peacock canceled the series after two seasons. According to Deadline Hollywood, Peacock executives were satisfied with the show's creative output, but it was unable to attract the necessary viewership to support more seasons.

== Release ==
The first three episodes premiered on Peacock on October 7, 2021, followed by three episodes on October 14, and the final two episodes of the first season on October 21. All eight episodes of season two were released on Peacock on October 21, 2022. On Netflix, the seasons were released on February 18 and November 16, 2022, respectively.

== Reception ==
On the review aggregator website Rotten Tomatoes, 91% of 11 critics' reviews are positive, with an average rating of 7.3/10.

Before its premiere, critics were given the first three episodes to review. From The Wall Street Journal, John Anderson said the series was difficult to categorize and wrote that "the way it careens its way through its various plot points, unencumbered by the need for explanations or narrative development" is what set the series apart as storytelling. He, however, felt that that was unnecessary, saying: "The conclusion will be a surprise, one assumes. But the getting there is, as they might say in French class, déjà vu." Brad Newsome, writing for The Sydney Morning Herald, said the story "deftly tweaks its balance of suspicions to keep things interesting, but it's McKenna and Van Grootel who really pull focus." The Hollywood Reporter's Angie Han said the series was missing a spark to set it apart from similar programming, with characters that feel like "archetypes", a "sour, dour mood, with few moments of either levity or raw pain", and dull colors that "keep the show's emotions at arm's length". She opined that due to its lack of "notable quirks or deep insights", the series is likely to be forgotten by the viewer once it ends.
