= Miss Mundo Dominicana 2011 =

- Date: September 20, 2011
- Venue: Renaissance Auditorio de Festival del Hotel Jaragua, Santo Domingo, Dominican Republic
- Broadcaster: Antena Latina & Canal 21
- Entrants: 24
- Placements: 11
- Winner: Marianly Tejada; Duarte

Miss Mundo Dominicana 2011 was held September 20, 2011, in Renaissance Auditorio de Festival del Hotel Jaragua, Santo Domingo. The Miss Mundo Dominicana winner represented the Dominican Republic in Miss World 2011, the Miss RD Internacional entered Miss International 2011, Miss Supranational RD entered Miss Supranational 2012, and the Miss Tourism Queen RD entered Miss Tourism Queen International 2011. The first runner up entered the Reinado Internacional del Café 2012. The winner was crowned by Sofinel Báez, Miss International Dominicana 2010.

== Results ==
=== Placements ===
Placement	Candidates
Miss Mundo Dominicana 2011	Duarte – Marianly Tejada
Miss Internacional República Dominicana	Espaillat – Catherine Ramírez
Miss Supranacional República Dominicana	Hermanas Mirabal – Sally Aponte
Miss Tourism Queen República Dominicana	La Vega – Carlina Durán
1st Runner-Up	Peravia – Bianca Hazim
2nd Runner-Up	La Altagracia – Lincy Valautta
Top 11	Puerto Plata – Licelote Ortíz; Santiago – Milagros de Moya; Valverde – Luz Rosario; Monte Cristi – Jinny Vargas; Santo Domingo Norte – Leslie Domínguez

- Tie between Miss Valverde and Miss Espaillat, making the Top 10 to Top 11

=== Regional Queens ===
Continental	Contestant
Cibao Occidental	Espaillat - Catherine Ramírez
Cibao Oriental	Duarte - Marianly Tejada
Oriental	La Altagracia - Lincy Valautta
Sur	Peravia - Bianca Hazim

=== Fast Track Awards ===
- Top Model* - Lincy Valautta (La Altagracia)
- Sport Miss* - Bianca Hazim (Peravia)
- Best Talent* - Milagros de Moya (Santiago)
- Beauty with a Purpose* - Licelote Ortíz (Puerto Plata)
- Beach Beauty* - Saly Aponte (Hermanas Mirabal)
- *Awarded and Placed in the Semifinals.

=== Special awards ===
- Miss Photogenic - Sally Aponte (Hermanas Mirabal)
- Miss Congeniality (voted by the candidates) - Bianca Hazim (Peravia)
- Best Face - Carola Duran (La Vega)
- Best National Costume - Sally Aponte (Hermanas Mirabal)

== Contestants ==
Province	Contestant	Age	Height	Hometown	Region
Azua	Ángela Gutiérrez Cáceres	18	1.77 m (5 ft 9 3/4 in)	Azua de Compostela	Sur
Barahona	Lidia María Lozada Tatís	22	1.78 m (5 ft 10 in)	Santo Domingo	Sur
Distrito Nacional	Nilcalys Nuñez Gregg	22	1.70 m (5 ft 7 in)	Santo Domingo	Sur
Duarte	Marianly Tejada Burgos	19	1.75 m (5 ft 9 in)	San Francisco de Macorís	Cibao Oriental
El Seibo	Elba Margarita Díaz Pujols	25	1.75 m (5 ft 9 in)	La Romana	Oriental
Espaillat	Catherine Ramírez Rosario	26	1.73 m (5 ft 8 in)	Santiago de los Caballeros	Cibao Occidental
Hato Mayor	Dania Ventura de los Santos	19	1.75 m (5 ft 9 in)	Hato Mayor del Rey	Oriental
Hermanas Mirabal	Sally Lucía Aponte Tejada	19	1.72 m (5 ft 7 3/4 in)	Salcedo	Cibao Oriental
La Altagracia	Lincy Valautta Bonnetti	20	1.80 m (5 ft 10 3/4 in)	Santo Domingo	Oriental
La Romana	Rosa Clarissa Ortíz Melo	25	1.81 m (5 ft 11 1/4 in)	La Romana	Oriental
La Vega	Carola Mercedes Durán Baldera	22	1.84 m (6 ft 1/2 in)	Concepción de La Vega	Cibao Oriental
Monseñor Nouel	Giselle Vásques de Torres	21	1.75 m (5 ft 9 in)	Santiago de los Caballeros	Cibao Oriental
Monte Cristi	Jinny Karen Vargas Castillo	21	1.63 m (5 ft 4 1/4 in)	Jarabacoa	Cibao Occidental
Monte Plata	Johanna Saint-Hilaire Cid	20	1.78 m (5 ft 10 in)	Monte Plata	Oriental
Peravia	Bianca Hazim Madera	18	1.75 m (5 ft 9 in)	Baní	Sur
Puerto Plata	Licelote Ortíz Paulino	21	1.82 m (5 ft 11 3/4 in)	San Felipe de Puerto Plata	Cibao Occidental
San Pedro de Macorís	Ambar Martínez Sosa	19	1.79 m (5 ft 10 1/2 in)	San Pedro de Macorís	Oriental
Sánchez Ramírez	Rosa Sofía Mora Peralta	23	1.69 m (5 ft 6 1/2 in)	Santo Domingo	Cibao Oriental
Santiago	Milagros de Moya Santos	20	1.66 m (5 ft 5 1/4 in)	Santiago de los Caballeros	Cibao Occidental
Santiago Rodríguez	Elizabeth Vargas Polanco	24	1.71 m (5 ft 7 1/4 in)	Santo Domingo	Cibao Occidental
Santo Domingo Este	Debbie Áflalo Vargas	18	1.73 m (5 ft 8 in)	Santo Domingo	Sur
Santo Domingo Norte	Leslie Domínguez Lavos	21	1.79 m (5 ft 10 1/2 in)	San Pedro de Macorís	Sur
Santo Domingo Oeste	Eliana Rosario Taveras	19	1.74 m (5 ft 8 1/2 in)	Santo Domingo	Sur
Valverde	Luz Rosario Almonte	20	1.78 m (5 ft 10 in)	Concepción de La Vega	Cibao Occidental

== Crossovers ==
Contestants who previously competed at other beauty pageants or were expected to:

Miss Dominican Republic 2011

- Azua: Ángela Gutiérrez Cáceres
- Hato Mayor: Dania Ventura de los Santos
- Hermanas Mirabal: Saly Lucía Aponte Tejada

Miss Dominican Republic 2010

- Espaillat: Catherine Ramírez Rosario (as Miss Santiago)
- El Seibo: Elba Pujols
- Valverde: Luz Rosario Almonte (as Miss La Vega)

Reina Nacional de Belleza Miss República Dominicana 2007

- Espaillat: Catherine Ramírez Rosario (as Miss La Vega)

Reina Nacional de Belleza Miss República Dominicana 2008

- Santo Domingo Norte: Leslie Domínguez Lavos (as Miss San Pedro de Macorís)

Miss Tierra República Dominicana 2009

- La Romana: Rosa Clarissa Ortíz Melo

Miss Turismo Dominicana 2009

- El Seibo: Elba Pujols (as Miss Barahona)

Miss Turismo Dominicana 2011

- Peravia: Bianca Hazim Madera
- Santo Domingo: Nilcalys Nunez (as Miss Independencia)
