= Motorheads =

American television series

- Genre: Coming of age; Drama
- Created by: John A. Norris
- Showrunner: John A. Norris
- Starring: Ryan Phillippe; Nathalie Kelley; Michael Cimino; Melissa Collazo; Uriah Shelton; Nicolas Cantu
- Music by: Waz and Jamie Jackson
- Country of origin: United States
- Original language: English
- No. of seasons: 1
- No. of episodes: 10

Production
- Executive producers: John A. Norris; Jason Seagraves; Jack Fuller; Neil Burger; Ruben Fleischer; Dana Brunetti; Keegan Rosenberger
- Producers: Morgan Howard; Matt Code
- Cinematography: Colin Hoult; Kristin Fieldhouse
- Editors: Erin Deck; Roderick Deogrades; Christopher Minns
- Running time: 48–57 minutes
- Production companies: Rambo Says Happy Birthday Inc.; Prod Co.; Jax Media; Amazon MGM Studios

Original release
- Network: Amazon Prime Video
- Release: May 20, 2025

Motorheads is an American coming-of-age drama television series created by John A. Norris. It premiered on Amazon Prime Video on May 20, 2025. In August 2025, the series was canceled after one season.

== Cast ==
=== Main ===
- Ryan Phillippe as Logan Maddox, a former NASCAR driver and an auto body shop owner in Ironwood, Pennsylvania
- Nathalie Kelley as Samantha, an ER nurse who moves back to her hometown Ironwood with her teenage son and daughter
- Michael Cimino as Zac, Samantha's son who reluctantly moves to Ironwood from Brooklyn, New York with his mother and twin sister
- Melissa Collazo as Caitlyn, Samantha's daughter and Zac's twin sister who loves fixing up cars
- Uriah Shelton as Curtis, a young mechanic and Caitlyn's love interest
- Nicolas Cantu as Marcel, a nerdy neighbor who befriends the twins

=== Recurring ===
- Josh Macqueen as Harris, an entitled popular teenager whose family own majority of the businesses in Ironwood and the local champion of street racing
- Drake Rodger as Ray, Curtis' older brother
- Mia Healey as Alicia, Harris' on and off girlfriend
- Johnna Dias-Watson as Kiara, Alicia's best friend and the closeted daughter of Ironwood's mayor
- Deacon Phillippe as Christian Maddox, Logan's brother in flashbacks from 17 years ago, a legendary, unbeaten champion of street racing
- Dylan Taylor as Vic
- Paul Braunstein as Mr. Ruby, Curtis and Caitlyn's auto shop teacher
- Matt Lanter as Darren, Harris' father
- Paul Popowich as Sheriff Hugo, Curtis and Ray's father and the sheriff of Ironwood
- Alex Paxton-Beesley as Kelly, Kiara's mother and Ironwood's mayor
- Jordan Dawson as Young Hugo, in flashbacks from 17 years ago
- Romeo Carere as Young Ezra, in flashbacks from 17 years ago
- Audrey Gerthoffer as Brooke, Harris' side piece whose parents are the current owners of Wade's Diner
- Joseph Chiu as Mateo, a local street racer who dissed Harris online and part of Ryan's crew
- Sophia Esperanza as Ryan, a local street racer

== Episodes ==
No.	Title	Directed by	Written by	Original release date
1	"Pilot"	Neil Burger	John A. Norris	May 20, 2025
In a late-night street race, Darren Bowders loses to Christian Maddox, who drives away after collecting on an undisclosed bet. Seventeen years later, teenage twins Caitlyn (“Cate”) and Zac Torres move from Brooklyn to Ironwood, Pennsylvania, their mother Samantha’s hometown. Staying with their uncle Logan, a former NASCAR driver now struggling to keep his auto shop afloat, the twins quickly encounter their father’s legacy. Once Ironwood’s most famous street racer, Christian vanished years earlier following a heist and high-speed police chase. At school, Zac befriends Marcel, a socially isolated student, but clashes with Harris Bowders, Darren’s son and the reigning street-race champion, particularly over Harris’s girlfriend Alicia Whitaker. Cate befriends Curtis, a loner navigating tensions between his father, Sheriff Hugo Maddox, and his brother Ray, a petty criminal. At a party, Harris sabotages Curtis by throwing his motorbike into a lake; in retaliation, Curtis steals Harris’s Corvette and delivers it to Ray’s chop shop. Later, Cate, Zac, Curtis, and Marcel uncover their father’s long-abandoned Dodge Charger, the “UNB10,” which Logan has been keeping in storage, and decide to restore it.
2	"Glow"	Neil Burger	John A. Norris	May 20, 2025
Present. Zac practices driving at the junkyard with “Dottie,” a battered car known to generations of Ironwood residents. The yard’s owner, Buzz, warns him that racing requires knowing whether he is “a hit the gas or hit the brakes” driver. Ray asks Logan to drive for his crew during a heist, but Logan refuses. At school, Harris is grounded without his car, forcing Alicia to drive him, while Curtis helps Cate with the UNB10’s restoration. Curtis turns to Ray for vintage parts, but Ray demands his help on a job in return. During Ironwood’s annual Fireflies Festival, Cate and Curtis grow closer, while Kiara, the mayor’s closeted daughter, shares a moment with Cate. Marcel reveals his new racing logo, and Zac loses a street race, wrecking Marcel’s car. That night, Ray and his gang attempt a robbery under the festival blackout, but police interference limits their haul. Afterward, they retaliate against Logan by destroying his classic Mustang. Cate, Zac, Curtis, and Marcel leap from Ironwood’s bridge as promised, though tensions flare when Marcel blames Zac for his broken car. Beneath the water, a necklace sinks - and Christian Maddox’s long-lost car is revealed at the river’s bottom. Past. Christian flees a police chase with three passengers, one of whom is revealed to be Hugo, Curtis' father and the sheriff of Ironwood.
3	"Assessment"	Ryan Zaragoza	John A. Norris	May 20, 2025
Present. Sam shows Cate and Zac her childhood neighbourhood, only to find it transformed. Hoping to repair his friendship with Marcel, Zac takes him to a dangerous racetrack once used by their father and uncle. Marcel injures his arm during a run, and Zac takes him to the hospital. Meanwhile, Cate attends a tense family barbecue with Curtis. That night, Zac covers Marcel’s diner job during a town movie screening, but a street takeover interrupts the event, with Harris participating in the chaos. Later, Zac and Alicia continue the movie at a diner, while Zac asks Logan to repair Marcel’s car, promising to cover the cost with his new job. Meanwhile, Logan and Samantha revisit their old neighbourhood and reminisce with Samantha riding her bike down the streets. Past. Kelly, Sam’s friend, knows that Samantha is pregnant with Christian’s child. The girls are called inside by Sam’s mother, where they watch a televised police chase. Sam realises that it's Christian driving and phones Logan, searching for Christian. We learn that during the police chase, Christian deliberately drove his car off Ironwood’s bridge. The three passengers — including Hugo — survive and emerge from the river, but Christian is nowhere to be found.
4	"Disassemble"	Ryan Zaragoza	Adrian Dukes	May 20, 2025
Present. Logan is worried when he thinks one of the teenagers will be racing the car. Harris learns that his stunt at the street takeover is being mocked online. Marcel joins design class in school. Curtis and Zac skip school after Curtis becomes upset with Cate, and Zac argues with Harris. Sam goes to the skate park and runs into Darren Bowers, and reminisces. It's revealed that Darren once tried to take Sam on a date. Kiara invites Cate along to lunch with her boyfriend Noah, as well as Alicia and Harris. Brooke befriends Marcel, but only to find out about Curtis. Zac and Curtis break down on the way to Pittsburgh, so Curtis calls his brother, who has Mikey take them to a racetrack. Ray offers to help Zac get ready to race, which worries Curtis. Cate helps Noah work out what's wrong with his car, but he insults her. Harris races the driver of "Midknight Rider", Mateo, who mocked him online, and wins. Darren takes Sam on a tour of the town, and admits that he raced Christian and bet that if he won, Christian would let Sam go. Logan refuses to teach Zac how to race, so he asks Ray instead. Curtis threatens Noah after he finds out Noah insulted Cate. Past. Logan teaches Christian how to drive and he proves to be an excellent racing driver. They go to the junkyard and Christian picks out the yellow Charger.
5	"Value"	Rebecca Rodriguez	Kenny Neibart	May 20, 2025
Present. Ray takes Zac to a late-night race and makes Zac race, which he loses and which puts him in debt to Ray. Darren tells Harris that he's agreed to sell the Bower real estate to Alicia's father, the owner of Bandit Technology. Logan goes to the Whitaker estate with Zac to look at some of Bruce Whitaker's classic cars. Marcel's dad agrees to make his famous chilli for the car auction. Sam takes Cate on a tour of the town and talks to her about Curtis and about the twins' father. Harris invites Brooke round and kisses her after promising her that he'd broken up with Alicia. Harris gets upset when he learns his dad can't back out of the real estate deal. Zac goes to the horse jumping event to support Alicia and tells her not to give up on what she loves doing. Brooke gets upset with Harris after learning he hasn't split up with Alicia, and kisses Curtis at the car auction, in front of Harris and Cate. Bruce buys Sam's old car, so Logan sells his Mustang to Whitaker and buys Sam's old car back for her. Zac goes back to Ray and persuades him to train him again. Past. Sam gets behind the wheel of her first car, a Mazda RX-7. It's implied she used to race it.
6	"Reassemble"	Rebecca Rodriguez	Carrie Gutenberg & Obiageli Odimegwu	May 20, 2025
Present. Zac wants another shot at racing, but Ray won't let him until he stops being 'too safe'. Logan struggles to use the new equipment he bought with the money from his Mustang. Marcel finds out from the sheriff that it was his dad who smashed the diner window, and that he has to move away for three months to live with his mom as a result. Cate, Zac, Marcel and Curtis decide to go to White Knuckle Run, a motocross event, before Marcel has to move away, but Zac says he can't, though doesn't admit it's because he's racing with Ray. Zac backs out of the race, wanting to hang out with Marcel and the others, but Ray gets angry and reminds Zac that he owes Ray a car. Logan, worried for Marcel, goes to Shippenburg to check out Marcel's mom and her new boyfriend. At the motocross event, Ryan sets the fastest time on the course, until Harris beats it. Ryan agrees to lend Zac her ride so he can beat Harris' time. Ray tries to figure out who's been tyre-jacking on his turf. In Shippenberg, Sam and Logan talk to Cheri, Marcel's mom, and Zeke, which doesn't reassure them. Zac beats Harris' time. Curtis confronts Ray about the fact that he's been training Zac. Marcel gets to stay with the Torres-Maddox family rather than going to stay with his mom. The sheriff confronts Ryan, who turns about to be Ezra's daughter, about the tyre-jacking, warning her to stop. Harris challenges Zac to a street race, and Catelyn says they need three weeks, though in reality, they need three months. Past. Hugo and Ezra, two members of the heist crew, flee from the police. Ezra has been hit, and can't go on. He asks Hugo what he thinks his little boy, Ray, is doing. Ezra doesn't want to go to hospital because he'll end up in prison.
7	"Red, Green, Blue"	Tara Nicole Weyr	Wendy Straker Hauser	May 20, 2025
Present. The crew work on trying to get the car ready for the race with Harris, though Logan puts his foot down. Zac sneaks out to race, and finally wins. Harris deals with his grief for his mother on the first birthday since her death as his dad throws a party and the Bowers name is erased from their former real estate. He hangs out with Ryan, Mateo, and their crew, and challenges Mateo, winning the Midknight Rider off him. Zac tells Logan that he's been racing, and that Ray Young has been training him. Cate receives a postcard from Spider Lake, Michigan that she thinks might be from her dad, until Logan reveals that he's received dozens and they never lead to Christian. Logan agrees to train Zac rather than having him train with Ray. Curtis takes Brooke on a date. Past. Christian and Logan fix up the Charger. Logan watches Christian's first race. Logan asks Christian what he'll do after he's won every race and broken every record, and he talks about a house on a lake and raising a family. They reminisce about spending time with their parents at Spider Lake.
8	"Wiring"	Tara Nicole Weyr	John A. Norris	May 20, 2025
Present. Ezra, Ryan's father and the third member of the heist crew, is released from prison. Logan trains Zac on a proper circuit track, but Zac's mom hovers and worries. Cate and Curtis hit an electrical snag with the car, while Logan finishes the Sunfire. Harris tries to work out how to get enough boost into the Midknight Rider so he can beat Zac and the others. Harris and Alicia break up. Marcel and Brooke design a Mad Max/apocalypse-themed homecoming, and after Marcel strikes out with a few girls, Cate agrees to go with him, while Curtis agrees to go with Brooke. Ezra threatens to tell everyone what happened 17 years ago if Hugo doesn't come up with the money he promised him during the heist. At the homecoming dance, things go badly, with Alicia finding out that Harris cheated on her with Brooke, Curtis punching Harris, and Harris stealing the limo and tearing up the football field. Kiara is named homecoming queen, and wants to dance with Cate, but Noah swoops in. Alicia is supportive of Kiara. Darren tells Sam that he's sold out to Bandit Technology. At the bar, Ray reveals to Hugo and Logan that Ezra has told him the truth about Hugos's role in the heist. Hugo and Logan try to figure out how to get the money to Ezra, and Hugo asks Logan if he saw Christian after the heist went down. Logan says that he pulled Christian out of the river. Zac kisses Alicia. Cate figures out the problem with the electrics, and she and Curtis dance together in the shop. Past. While Ezra and Hugo are fleeing the police after the heist, Hugo promises Ezra he'll have his cut of the money waiting after he gets out of prison.
9	"Ignition"	Glen Winter	John A. Norris	May 20, 2025
Present. Zac races Ray on the track. 24 hours earlier, Hugo and Logan talk about the day of the robbery. Cate and Curtis think the car is ready, but discover that they can't get it to start. Logan and Hugo go to talk to Ray and Ezra, who want Logan and Hugo's help to steal Bruce Whitaker's classic car collection. Brooke gets the internship in New York. Ryan helps Harris upgrade the Midknight Rider, but wants him to meet her dad. Sam finds out that Darren was the one who called Christian on the day of the heist and warned him, and that it was Kelly who called the police and told them Christian was driving. Curtis and Cate finish the car. Logan makes a deal with Ray, which is how Ray ends up racing against Zac. Zac wins the race. Alicia shows Zac her dad's car collection. Sam tells Logan that she knows where the money is because she helped Christian bury it. Ray tells Curtis about their dad's part in the robbery. The crew get the car to start. Past. Two figures bury a couple of bags in the rain. Christian gets a text during the heist and receives a call from someone who owes him a favour, telling the heist is going to go wrong. Christian survives the drive off the bridge and meets Logan on the riverbank. He tells Logan to keep his gloves safe and leaves with the money. A young Sam and Christian bury the money in a field in the rain.
10	"Redbird"	Glen Winter	John A. Norris	May 20, 2025
Present. Sam and Logan make plans to retrieve the buried money from the heist. Sam says that when Zac and Cait find out the truth, they won't want to live with Logan anymore. Marcel finishes painting the car, and Zac prepares for the race. Cait tries driving Dottie at the junkyard. Kiara comes out to her mother at the diner. Hugo has an argument with Curtis, and then explains what happened during the heist. Logan finds out from Ezra that Zac is going to race Harris in Christian's car. Brooke talks to Marcel about what he's going to do, since he doesn't have the internship, but he doesn't know yet. Logan gets rid of the car, which causes problems for Zac, who's agreed on a date to race Harris. Harris meets Ryan's dad, and finds out that Ray has Christian's car. He joins Ray, Ryan and Ezra with the plan for the theft of Bruce Whitaker's cars. Logan talks to Sam and asks her not to leave with the kids. Curtis talks to Zac about what happened the day of the robbery: Curtis' dad, Hugo, planned the robbery, but needed a driver, and Logan suggested his brother. Zac talks Logan out of driving for the theft, and gives him the security code for Whitaker's cars. The heist goes ahead, and they successfully steal four cars, including Logan's Mustang. However, after a phone call from Zac, Harris quits halfway through and leaves the Ferrari by the side of the road. He agrees to race Zac. Curtis kisses Caitlyn before telling her the truth about the heist 17 years ago, including his dad's part in it. Curtis tells Brooke that he won't be going to Brooklyn with her, but Marcel later agrees to go with her and be her "Brooklyn Buddy". Zac gets the '73 Charger back from Ray after he reminds Ray that he beat him in a race and Ray owes him a car. Caitlyn decides to start on a new project. Sam and Logan discover that the money is gone, and Christian left an old photograph of him and Logan at Spider Lake, Michigan. The race between Harris and Zac finally happens, though without any witnesses, and with the only stakes to see who's the best. As they're neck and neck, Harris' wheel rolls into the pothole Zac mapped out on the road earlier, his tyre bursts, and his car flips off the road. Harris' car goes up in flames. Caitlyn receives a call from an unknown number in Spider Lake, Michigan. Past. Sam and Christian bury the money. Sam makes Christian promise that he'll come back to them.

== Production ==
=== Development ===
The series was commissioned by Amazon Prime Video in November 2023. It is written by John A. Norris who is also the series showrunner and executive producer. Jason Seagraves also executive produces. It is produced by Jax Media and Amazon MGM Studios. Dana Brunetti and Keegan Rosenberger are executive producers and Jake Fuller is executive producer on behalf of Jax Media. Ruben Fleischer is director for the pilot and Ryan Zaragoza is co-executive producer. In March 2024, Neil Burger joined as director, replacing Fleischer, and executive producer. Waz and Jamie Jackson are composing the series' score. On August 29, 2025, Amazon Prime Video canceled the series after one season, but is being shopped to other networks.

=== Casting ===
The cast includes Ryan Phillippe, Nathalie Kelley, Michael Cimino and Melissa Collazo. In December 2023, Uriah Shelton joined the cast, with Drake Rodger, Johnna Dias-Watson, Josh Macqueen and Mia Healey joining in recurring roles. In May 2024, Matt Lanter and Sophia Esperanza were cast in recurring roles. In April 2025 in a press release from Amazon MGM Studios, Nicolas Cantu was confirmed to be promoted to a main role.

=== Filming ===
Filming was scheduled to commence from July to November 2023 but was delayed by the 2023 SAG-AFTRA strike. Production officially began on March 25, 2024, in Toronto, Canada. In April 2024, parts of filming took place in Hamilton, Ontario, in the Carlisle and Flamborough neighborhoods, and began filming in downtown Paris, Ontario, locally on April 16, being first of five visits until July. Next filing took place in Chatsworth, Ontario, at a Motopark. Filming also took place at Penman's Dam Park and Bean Park in Brant, Ontario, and at the historic Blackfriars Street Bridge in London, Ontario. Filming concluded on July 22, 2024.

== Release ==
The series premiered on May 20, 2025, with all ten episodes.

== Reception ==
The review aggregator website Rotten Tomatoes reported a 78% approval rating based on 9 critic reviews. Metacritic, which uses a weighted average, gave a score of 58 out of 100 based on 5 critics, indicating "mixed or average".

Angie Han of The Hollywood Reporter described the series as "Life-changing stuff, this isn't, even if the characters do like to throw around knowingly cheesy metaphors about hitting the gas in romance as well as on the road. It's just sturdy, reliable entertainment — well worth putting down your phone for and taking for a proper spin."
