= Marple: Twelve New Stories =

Collection of Miss Marple pastiches, published in 2022

- Language: English
- Genre: Detective fiction
- Publisher: HarperCollins
- Publication date: 12 September 2022
- Publication place: United Kingdom
- Media type: Print, audio
- Pages: 384
- Followed by: Poirot: Twelve New Stories

Marple: Twelve New Stories, (also published as Marple: Twelve New Mysteries), is a 2022 short story collection featuring Agatha Christie's fictional amateur detective Miss Jane Marple.

Authorised by Christie's estate, the anthology features a dozen brand new mysteries, each written by a prominent female author. The book followed on from Sophie Hannah's successful series of continuation novels featuring Hercule Poirot, another Christie character. It was the first officially sanctioned new Miss Marple title to be released since Christie's death in 1976.

Lucy Foley, who contributed "Evil in Small Places" to the collection, subsequently became the first writer since Christie's passing to pen a new Marple novel with the release of Murder at the Grand Alpine Hotel in 2026.

A follow-up volume, focusing on Hercule Poirot, is set for release in 2027.

== List of stories ==
- Evil in Small Places by Lucy Foley
- The Second Murder at the Vicarage by Val McDermid
- Miss Marple Takes Manhattan by Alyssa Cole
- The Unravelling by Natalie Haynes
- Miss Marple's Christmas by Ruth Ware
- The Open Mind by Naomi Alderman
- The Jade Empress by Jean Kwok
- A Deadly Wedding Day by Dreda Say Mitchell
- Murder at the Villa Rosa By Elly Griffiths
- The Murdering Sort by Karen M. McManus
- The Mystery of the Acid Soil by Kate Mosse
- The Disappearance by Leigh Bardugo

=== Audio ===
The audiobook release featured a different narrator for each story. The performers were Alex Kingston, Adrian Scarborough, Adjoa Andoh, Imogen Stubbs, Alison Steadman, Jodhi May, Chipo Chung, Cathy Tyson, Ramon Tikaram, Tanya Reynolds, Celia Imrie and Miriam Margolyes.

Additionally, three of the stories were broadcast in multiple parts on BBC Radio 4 as Marple: Three New Stories, with different performers from the audiobook. John Heffernan read "Murder at the Villa Rose", Georgie Glen performed "Miss Marple's Christmas" and Monica Dolan narrated "The Unravelling".

== Reception ==
In a review for The Guardian, critic Stephanie Merritt wrote the book reinvents the "from a fresh perspective, while remaining true to the character’s role as a shrewd observer of human nature and social change... Purists may cavil at some of the subjects or locales, but taken as a whole, this highly enjoyable collection illustrates Worsley’s conclusion: “Although Miss Marple stories are often described as cosy crime, this is a bold, dark, troubling view of the world.” It’s also a testament to the enduring power of Christie’s imagination."
