= Nothing More To Tell =

2022 young adult mystery novel by Karen M. McManus

- First edition cover
- Author: Karen M. McManus
- Publisher: Delacorte Press
- Publication date: August 30, 2022
- ISBN: 978-0-593-17590-3

Nothing More To Tell is a 2022 young adult mystery novel by American author Karen M. McManus. In the novel, 17-year-old Brynn Gallagher investigates a cold case regarding the murder of her eighth-grade English teacher.

== Plot ==
Nothing More to Tell follows high school senior Brynn Gallagher, who has recently relocated to Sturgis, Massachusetts after her family had moved away from the town four years earlier. Brynn, desperate for something to go her away after being fired from her school's newspaper and being waitlisted for her top university, applies for an internship with a popular true crime podcast, Motive. During her interview, she brings up an unsolved case from her own life: the murder of her eighth grade English teacher, William Larkin. Larkin's body was found behind the Saint Ambrose prep school by three students, rich kids Shane, Charlotte, and Tripp, Brynn's former best friend. Despite evidence suggesting the students may have been involved, they were never investigated, and the perpetrator was never found. Now that Brynn is a student at Saint Ambrose again and an intern with Motive, she investigates the murder herself.

== Style ==
Nothing More to Tell shifts perspectives between Brynn Gallagher in the present day and Tripp Talbot, sometimes four years earlier. Publishers Weekly found that the "emotionally complex alternating first-person accounts enrich character while imparting immediacy and drive". Kharissa Khenner, writing for Shelf Awareness, similarly noted that the "dual points of view builds character, suspense and tone".

== Reception ==
Nothing More to Tell is a Junior Library Guild book, and a New York Times Best Seller. It was well received by critics, including starred reviews from Kirkus Reviews, Publishers Weekly, School Library Journal, and Shelf Awareness.

Reviewers often discussed McManus's skill as a mystery writer, with Kirkus Reviews and Publishers Weekly called Nothing More to Tell McManus's best mystery novel to date. Publishers Weekly highlighted how "the central whodunit spirals into myriad tertiary puzzles, making for a serpentine read rife with convincing red herrings and ground-shifting reveals". Booklist's Maggie Reagan additionally discussed McManus's "signature blend of high-stakes high-school drama and murderous twists readers won’t see coming".

In 2022, Kirkus Reviews named Nothing More to Tell one of the best books of the year, and it was nominated for the Goodreads Choice Award for Best Young Adult Fiction. The following year, the Young Adult Library Services Association included it on their list of the Best Fiction for Young Adults.
