= Christmas Caper =

2007 film directed by David Winkler

- DVD cover
- Written by: April Blair
- Directed by: David Winkler
- Starring: Shannen Doherty; Sonya Salomaa; Stefanie von Pfetten; Ty Olsson
- Country of origin: United States
- Original language: English

Production
- Producers: James Shavick; Karen S. Spiegel
- Running time: 90 minutes

Original release
- Network: ABC Family
- Release: November 25, 2007

Christmas Caper is an ABC Family Original Movie. It aired on November 25, 2007, on ABC Family as part of their Countdown to 25 Days of Christmas. The film stars Shannen Doherty, Ty Olsson, Sonya Salomaa and Stefanie von Pfetten.

== Plot ==
A Grinch-like thief retreats to her hometown in Connecticut after a con goes bad and gets stuck baby-sitting her niece and nephew until their parents can make it home for Christmas. She spends most of her time devising ways to even the score with Clive, her partner in crime, until the spirit of the holidays can help put her priorities back on track.

== Cast ==
- Shannen Doherty as Cate Dove
- Ty Olsson as Sheriff Hank Harrison
- Conrad Coates as Clive Henry
- Stefanie von Pfetten as Holly Barnes
- Sonya Salomaa as Savannah Cooper
- David Lewis as Brian Cooper
- Michael P. Northey as Duffy Abramowitz
- Josh Hayden as Parker Cooper
- Natasha Calis as Annie Cooper
- Donna White as Mrs. Bradley
- Jano Frandsen as Hamish Thurgood
- Jase-Anthony Griffith as Deputy Gary
- Val Cole as News Anchor
- Dax Belanger as Thurgood Guard
- Dee Jay Jackson as Cabbie
- Christina Jastrzembska as Verda
- Tara Wilson as Café Waitress
- Deni DeLory as Bug Buy Female Shopper
- Igor Morozov as Russian Fence
- Dalias Blake as Happy Hotel Guy
- Reg Tupper as Principal Grimes
- Lossen Chambers as Gossipy Neighbor
- Iris Paluly as Second Neighbor
- Tyronne L'Hirondelle as Jolly Guy
- Rob deLeeuw as Tourist
- Jason McKinnon as Thurgood Monitor Guy
- Troy Adamson as Mall Bench Guy (uncredited)

== DVD ==
Christmas Caper was released on DVD on October 28, 2008.

== Filming locations ==
Christmas Caper was filmed in Vancouver, British Columbia, Canada.

== See also ==
- List of Christmas films
