= Sara Thompson (Canadian actress) =

Canadian actress

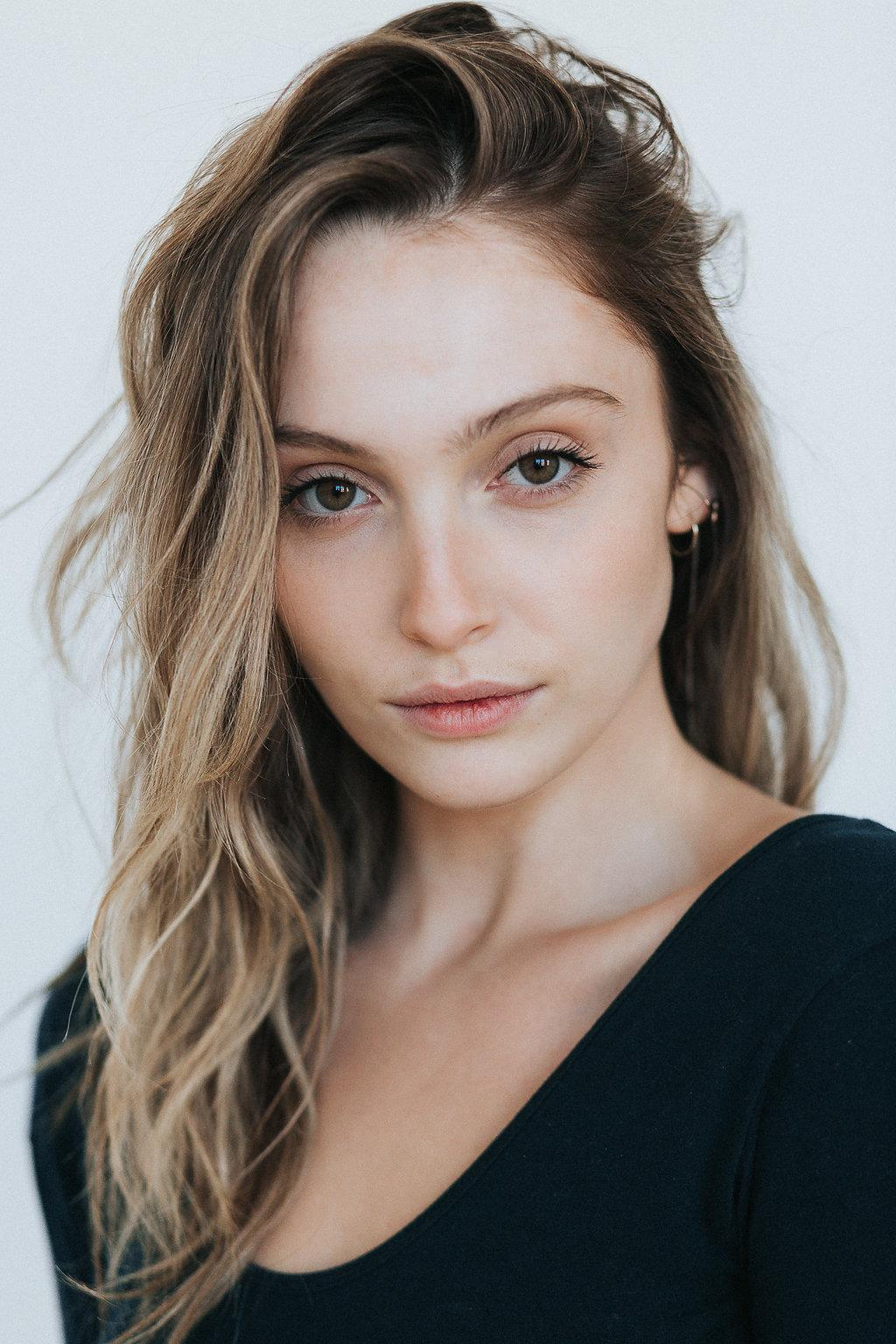
- Thompson in 2020
- Born: September 4, 1995 (age 31); Winnipeg, Manitoba
- Occupation: Actress
- Years active: 2008–present

Sara Thompson (born September 4, 1995) is a Canadian actress. She is known for her roles in the TV series Burden of Truth (2018–2019), The 100 (2019–2020) and One of Us Is Lying (2021–2022).

== Early life ==
Sara Thompson was born and raised in Winnipeg, Manitoba. She trained as an actor at the New York Film Academy.

In addition to acting, Thompson is also a dancer, having danced since she was three years old. She is classically trained in multiple genres, such as contemporary, hip hip, ballet and jazz and has competed in dancing competitions internationally, at one point winning a silver medal from a world championship in Poland for contemporary dance. Thompson stopped dancing professionally and competitively at the age of eighteen.

== Career ==
Thompson made her acting debut in 2008 at the age of twelve, when she appeared in the film Make it Happen. She subsequently made further appearances in feature films, landing minor roles in Lovesick (2016), I Still See You (2018) and Night Hunter (2018) and a major role in the film The Return (2020).

Her first major television role was Molly Ross in the legal drama series Burden of Truth. She later appeared in the post-apocalyptic science fiction series The 100 as Josephine Lightbourne, one of the series' villains. She landed the role after Richard Harmon her co-star from The Return, who plays Murphy on The 100, told her that they needed someone for the role and she would be perfect for it. She sent her audition tape and was eventually cast for the role.

In October 2021, Thompson appeared in Peacock TV series One of Us Is Lying as Vanessa Clark.

== Filmography ==
=== Film ===
Year	Title	Character	Notes
2008	Make it Happen	Young Lauryn	
2016	Lovesick	Waitress	
2018	I Still See You	Janine	
2018	Night Hunter	Julie	
2020	The Return	Beth Struman	

=== Television ===
Year	Title	Character	Notes
2017	Channel Zero	Pink Haired Girl	Episode: "The Hollow Girl"
2018–2019	Burden of Truth	Molly Ross	Main role (season 1–2)
2019–2020	The 100	Josephine Lightbourne I	Recurring role (season 6); guest (season 7)
2021	Charmed	Julie	Episode: "Yew Do You"
2021–2022	One of Us Is Lying	Vanessa Clark	Recurring role (season 1), main (season two)

== Personal life ==
Thompson was diagnosed with epilepsy when she suffered a grand mal seizure at the age of 16. She says that because of the correct medicine, she has been seizure free many years. She found it easy to connect with her role as Molly Ross in Burden of Truth since Molly in the storyline also has seizures.

Thompson is part of the Orange Daisy Project, a campaign that seeks to promote mental health in young women.
