= Dreda Say Mitchell =

British writer and political commentator

Dreda Say Mitchell MBE
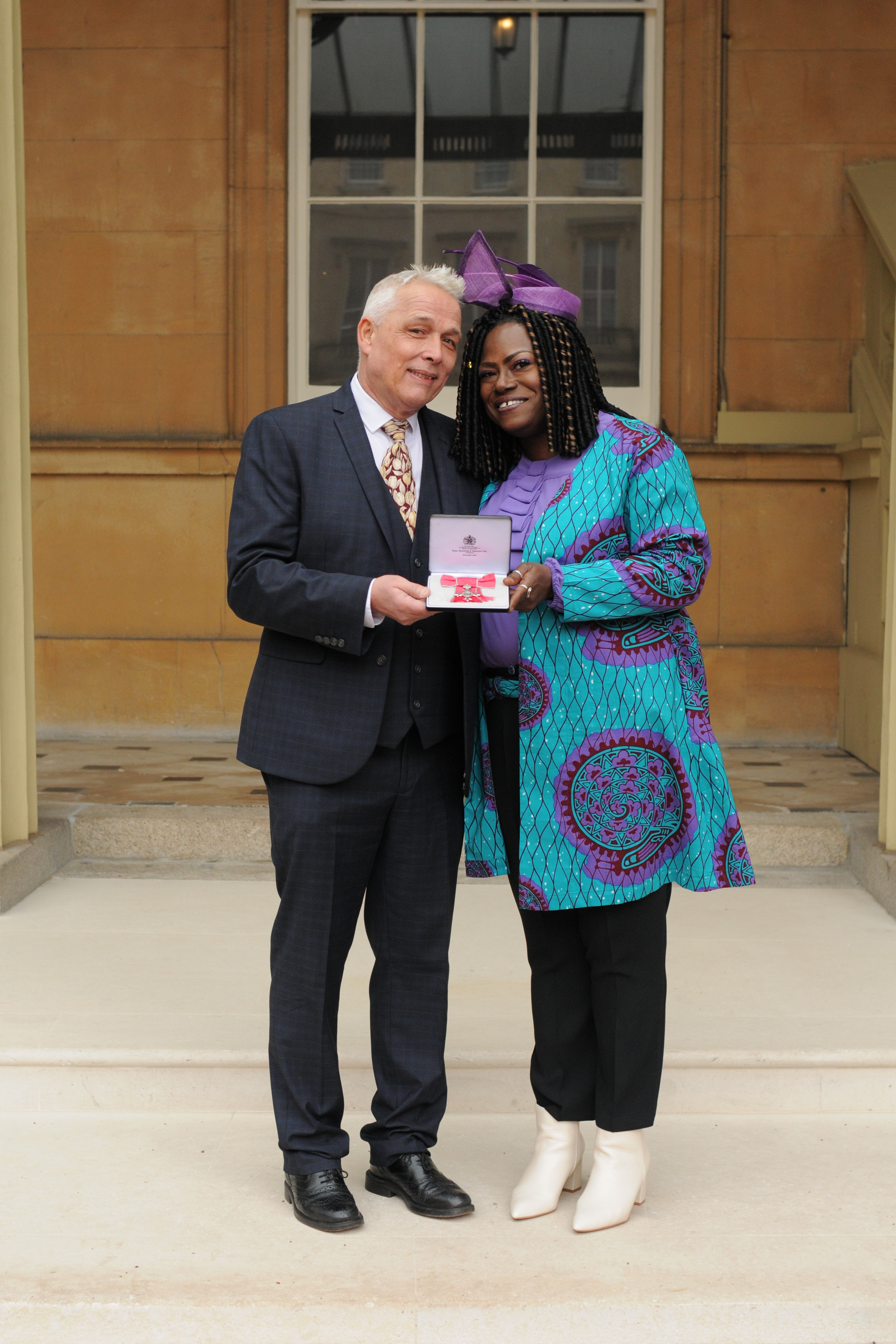
- Mitchell (right) with Tony Mason, her husband and writing partner, at Buckingham Palace after receiving her MBE in 2020.
- Born: Louise Emma Joseph; 1965 (age 60–61); London, UK
- Education: School of Oriental and African Studies, BA (Hons); London Metropolitan University, MA; Goldsmiths, University of London
- Occupations: Writer, broadcaster
- Notable work: Spare Room; Say Her Name; Running Hot
- Spouse: Tony Mason
- Website: dredamitchell.com

Louise Emma Joseph MBE (born 1965), known professionally as Dreda Say Mitchell, is a British novelist, broadcaster, journalist and campaigner. She was appointed a Member of the Order of the British Empire (MBE) in 2020 for her services to literature and educational work in prisons. She has co-written many of her books with Tony Mason.

== Early life and education ==
Mitchell grew up on a housing estate in the East End of London, England. Her parents are from the Caribbean island of Grenada. She attended Bishop Challoner Girls' School. She received a BA (Hons) degree in African history from the School of Oriental and African Studies at the University of London, and an MA in education studies from the University of North London.

== Career ==
Mitchell's writing career started on a creative writing course at Soho's Groucho Club, where she began writing her first novel Running Hot. Her debut was awarded the Memorial John Creasey Dagger, CWA, in 2005, the first time a Black British author has scooped this award. She has since written seventeen crime books, many with her writing partner Tony Mason (Ryan Carter), including their international best-selling psychological thriller, Spare Room. Lee Child describes her work, "As good as it gets. Mitchell is English fiction's brightest new voice." Her Gangland Girls Crime series has been a No.1 crime series on Amazon. She has also written a Quick Read for The Reading Agency as part of their drive to enhance reading skills among hard to reach communities. She has been a judge on the National Book Awards, Index on Censorship Awards and The John Creasey Dagger. She was the 2011 chair of the Harrogate Theakston Crime Fiction Festival, Europe's largest crime festival. Mitchell and Mason were part of Sky Arts ground-breaking Arts50 in 2019.

Mitchell is one of 12 contemporary female writers – also including Val McDermid, Naomi Alderman, Kate Mosse, Elly Griffiths and Ruth Ware – chosen as contributors to a new anthology featuring Agatha Christie's fictional character Miss Marple.

=== Journalism ===
Mitchell is also a social and cultural commentator who has presented BBC Radio 4's, Open Book and BBC Radio 3's The Sunday Feature exploring life on housing estates. Her television appearances include Question Time, Newsnight, The Review Show, Front Row Late, BBC Breakfast, The Victoria Derbyshire Show and Canada's Sun News Live. Her radio credits include BBC Radio 4's Front Row, Saturday Review, Vanessa, The Simon Mayo Show, Four Thought and Nightwaves. For many years she reviewed the newspapers on The Nolan Show, BBC 5 Live.

Mitchell has written for The Guardian, The Independent and The Observer, on issues including "race", culture and class.

Mitchell appeared for the pro-Brexit side on a number of televised debates.

=== Educational work ===
Mitchell was commissioned by the Youth Justice Board to facilitate Write-on, a pilot creative writing and mentoring project in Feltham and Cookham Wood YOIs focusing on children of African-Caribbean, mixed-heritage and white working-class backgrounds. One of the students was awarded three Koestler awards, including the inaugural Peter Selby Award for Under-18 Creative Writing. Mitchell continues to work in prisons as a guest speaker and delivering creative writing workshops.

== Awards and honours ==
- MBE in Her Majesty The Queen's 2020 New Year Honours, for services to literature and education work in prisons.
- The Memorial John Creasey Dagger, Crime Writers' Association, 2005, the first time a Black British writer has scooped this honour.
- World Book Night Selection, Geezer Girls, 2014.
- Contributor in the multi-award winning Books To Die For anthology, 2014
- 50 Remarkable Women in Britain, Lady Geek in association with Nokia, 2012
- Silver Contribution Award, Calabash, 2011

== Charities ==
- Trustee, The Royal Literary Fund.
- Ambassador, The Reading Agency.
- Patron, SI Leeds Literary Prize for unpublished fiction by Black and Asian women.

== Bibliography ==
- Running Hot, MAIA Press, 2004
- Killer Tune, Hodder, 2007
- Marple: Twelve New Stories - "A Deadly Wedding Day", HarperCollins, 2022

=== Gangland Girl Series ===
- Geezer Girls, Hodder, 2009
- Gangster Girl, Hodder, 2010
- Hit Girls, Hodder, 2011

=== DI Rio Wray Thriller Series ===
- Vendetta, Hodder, 2014
- Death Trap, Hodder, 2015
- Snatched (e-novella), Hodder, 2015

=== Flesh and Blood Series ===
- Blood Sister, Hodder, 2016
- Blood Mother, Hodder, 2017
- Blood Daughter, Hodder, 2017
- Blood Secrets, Mitchell and Joseph, 2018
- One False Move (novella), Quick Read, 2017

=== Psychological Standalones ===
- Spare Room, Bloodhound Books, 2019
- Trap Door, Bloodhound Books, 2020
- Say Her Name, Amazon Publishing, 2022

=== Big Mo Crime Series ===
- Dirty Tricks, Mitchell and Joseph, 2020
- Fight Dirty, Mitchell and Joseph, 2020
- Wicked Women, Mitchell and Joseph, 2021
