= Jess McLeod =

Canadian actor

- Born: January 25, 1997 (age 29)
- Occupations: Actor, writer
- Years active: 2005–present
- Television: One of Us Is Lying

Jess McLeod (born January 25, 1997) is a Canadian actor and writer who played Janae Mathews on both series of Netflix teen television drama One of Us Is Lying and Bernie Simon in the 2023 Christmas slasher film It's a Wonderful Knife. McLeod was credited as Jessica McLeod in earlier roles, including the 2014 film Preggoland, where they played the character Liz. McLeod now uses Jess as their professional name and uses they/them pronouns, having transitioned from using their earlier name Jessica in screen credits.

== Early life ==
McLeod is from Victoria, British Columbia. They attended Claremont Secondary School. At school they were a part of Claremont Musical Theatre and starred as Elle Woods in its production of the musical Legally Blonde.

== Career ==
Mcleod started as a child actor, appearing in 2006 comedy Scary Movie 4 as a schoolgirl reading My Pet Duck to Leslie Nielsen as the American president. Their later acting credits include roles in Eve of Destruction, Shall We Play?, and the Van Helsing TV series. They had a role in Canadian comedy drama series You Me Her.

In 2019, McLeod was cast in Peacock teen television drama One of Us Is Lying. McLeod played Janae Mathews on both series of the show.

McLeod could be seen alongside Sandra Bullock and Viola Davis in the 2021 film The Unforgivable. They appeared as Bernie Simon in the 2023 film It's a Wonderful Knife. In November 2023, they won the ACTRA Award for best performance in a short film for their role in A Little Vacation, the script for which they also co-wrote.

== Personal life ==
McLeod is non-binary and uses they/them pronouns. They are based in Vancouver.

== Filmography ==
=== Film ===
Year	Title	Role
2006	Scary Movie 4	Little girl
2009	Mr. Troop Mom	Paulina
2014	Preggoland	Liz
2021	The Unforgivable	Hannah Whelan
2023	A Little Vacation	Jess
2023	It's a Wonderful Knife	Bernie Simon
2025	Normal	Alex Gunderson
2025	Akashi	Shelby
2026	Our Effed Up World	Finn
2026	Teenage Sex and Death at Camp Miasma	Tracy

=== Television ===
Year	Title	Role	Notes
2013	Eve of Destruction	Ruby	Miniseries
2018–2019	You Me Her	Sasha	12 episodes
2019	Van Helsing	Shelley	TV series
2020	Shall We Play?	Jess	TV series
2021–2022	One of Us Is Lying	Janae Matthews	16 episodes; Peacock teen drama; both seasons
2025	The Irrational	Olivia Ellison	1 episode
2026	The Audacity	Harper	Recurring season 1, Main season 2

== Writing credits ==
Year	Title	Type	Notes
2023	A Little Vacation	Short film	Co-wrote script

== Awards ==
Year	Award	Category	Work	Result
2023	UBCP/ACTRA Awards	Best Performance in a Short Film	A Little Vacation	Won
