= Jodi Thomas =

American writer

Jodi Koumalats
- Born: Amarillo, Texas, U.S.
- Education: Texas Tech University
- Occupation: Novelist
- Writing career
- Pen name: Jodi Thomas
- Period: 1988–present
- Genre: historical romance
- Notable awards: RITA award – Best Historical Romance; 1991 The Tender Texan; RITA award – Best Historical Romance; 1994 The Tame a Texan's Heart; RITA award – Best Historical Romance; 2006 The Texan's Reward
- Website: www.jodithomas.com

Jodi Thomas (born Amarillo, Texas) is the pen name of Jodi Koumalats, an American author of historical romance novels, most of which are set in Texas. In 2006, she was inducted into the Romance Writers of America Hall of Fame.

== Biography ==
Jodi Thomas is a fifth-generation Texan, whose grandmother was born in Texas in a covered wagon. She grew up in Amarillo, Texas and moved to Lubbock to attend Texas Tech University. She has a master's degree in Family Studies.

Thomas married Tom Koumalats and spent several years travelling while he served in the United States Army. The couple then returned to Amarillo and had two sons. Both husband and wife became teachers, and for the next fifteen years Thomas taught family living at Amarillo High School.

In 1984, worried that teacher salaries would be insufficient to save for her children's college education, Thomas began writing. Her first published work was an article for the Oklahoma Daily about the Llano Cemetery in Amarillo. She also sold many short stories for children, most averaging about 244 words. By 1988, Thomas had begun writing in earnest after work. When she sold her first book, publishers suggested that her surname, Koumalats, was too ethnic. As a compromise, she took her husband's first name as her pen name.

Thomas's first novel, Beneath the Texas Sky, met with critical success. It won a Romantic Times Reviewer's Choice Award for Best Western Romance and was designated a National Press Women Novel of the Year. By 1991, Thomas was able to quit teaching to become a full-time writer. She has won three Romance Writers of America RITA Awards,–the highest award given to romance novelists– in 1992, 1995, and 2006. Her third win, for The Texan's Reward, led to her immediate induction into the Romance Writers of America Hall of Fame. Thomas has been nominated for RITAs several other times. Her novels have been translated into at least six languages. Several of her novels have appeared on the New York Times Bestseller List or the USA Today Bestseller List.

In 2003, Thomas became the writer-in-residence at West Texas A&M University. She was only the second writer-in-residence to be appointed.

== Books ==
Thomas began writing historical romances in the early 1980s because she was dissatisfied with the ones she had read. In many cases, the romances she picked up contained historical errors or relationships that she thought were implausible. Her own novels draw on family stories of living in Texas, as well as months of research for each. The majority of her novels are set in Texas, and many contain the word "Texas" or "Texan" in the title.

Although most of her novels are historical or contemporary romances, with Widows of Wichita County Thomas branched into mainstream women's fiction.

== Awards ==
- 1988 - National Press Women's Novel of the Year, Beneath the Texas Sky
- 1990 - (Texas) Panhandle Professional Writers Best Novel, Northern Star
- 1990 - Oklahoma Writers Federation, Inc. best novel, Northern Star
- 1991 - Romance Writers of America (RWA) RITA Award for Best Historical Romance, The Tender Texan
- 1994 - Romance Writers of America RITA Award for Best Historical Romance, To Tame a Texan's Heart
- 1998 - Romantic Time Magazine Career Achievement Award for outstanding contributions to women's fiction over the past ten years
- 1999 - Romantic Times Magazine Career Achievement Award for Outstanding Fiction
- 2002 - Named a Texas Tech University Distinguished Alumna
- 2005 - National Reader's Choice Award, Finding Mary Blaine
- 2006 - Romance Writers of America (RWA) RITA Award,The Texan's Reward
- 2006 - Inducted into the Romance Writers of America Hall of Fame

== Bibliography ==
=== The Wife Lottery Series ===
- The Texan's Wager, 2002
- When a Texan Gambles, 2003
- A Texan's Luck, 2004
- The Texan's Reward, 2005

=== The McLain Series ===
- The Texan's Touch, 1998
- To Kiss a Texan, 1999
- To Wed in Texas, 2000
- Twilight in Texas, 2001
- The Texan's Dream, 2001

=== The Whispering Mountain Series ===
- Texas Rain, 2006
- Texas Princess, 2007
- Tall, Dark, and Texan, 2008
- The Lone Texan, 2009
- Texas Blue, 2011
- Wild Texas Rose, 2012
- Promise Me Texas, 2013

=== The Harmony Series ===
- Welcome to Harmony, 2010 - Book 1 - Harmony Series
- Somewhere Along the Way, 2010 - Book 2 - Harmony Series
- The Comforts of Home, 2011 - Book 3 - Harmony Series
- Just Down the Road, 2012 - Book 4 - Harmony Series
- Chance of a Lifetime, 2013 - Book 5 - Harmony Series
- Can't Stop Believing, 2013 - Book 6 - Harmony Series
- Betting the Rainbow, 2014 - Book 7 - Harmony Series
- A Place Called Harmony (Series Prequel), 2014 - Book 8 - Harmony Series
- One True Heart, April 7, 2015 - Book 9 - Harmony Series

=== The Ransom Canyon Series ===
- 0.5: Silverleaf Rapids, 2025
- 1: Ransom Canyon, 2015
- 1.5: Winter's Camp, 2015
- 2: Rustler's Moon, 2016
- 3: Lone Heart Pass, 2016
- 4: Sunrise Crossing, 2016
- 5: Wild Horse Springs, 2017
- 6: Indigo Lake, 2017
- 6.5: A Christmas Affair, 2017
- 7: Mistletoe Miracles, 2018
- 8: Christmas in Winter Valley, 2019

=== The Historical Series ===
- Beneath the Texas Sky, 1988
- Northern Star, 1990
- The Tender Texan, 1991
- Prairie Song, 1992
- Cherish the Dream, 1993
- The Texan and the Lady, 1994
- To Tame a Texan's Heart, 1994
- Forever in Texas, 1995
- Texas Love Song, 1996
- Two Texas Hearts, 1997

=== The Contemporary Series ===
- The Widows of Wichita County, 2003
- Finding Mary Blaine, 2004
- The Secrets of Rosa Lee, 2005
- Twisted Creek, 2008
- Rewriting Monday, 2009

=== Anthologies ===
- Sweet Hearts, 1993
- A Country Christmas, 1993
- How to Lasso a Cowboy, 2004
- Give Me a Texan, 2008
- Give Me a Cowboy, 2009
- Give Me a Texas Ranger, 2010
- Give Me a Texas Outlaw, 2011
- A Texas Christmas, 2011
- Be My Texas Valentine, 2012
- One Texas Night, 2013
- Boots Under Her Bed, 2014

== Adaptation ==
A 10-part television series entitled Ransom Canyon began production in 2024 for Netflix.
