= One of Us Is Lying =

2017 novel by Karen M. McDonald

- Author: Karen M. McManus
- Language: English
- Genre: Young adult fiction Mystery fiction Contemporary fiction
- Published: May 29, 2017 (Delacorte Press, US); June 1, 2017 (Penguin Books, UK)
- Publication place: United States
- Media type: Print (hardback and paperback); Audiobook; E-book
- Pages: 368
- ISBN: 978-0-141-37563-2
- Followed by: One of Us Is Next

One of Us Is Lying is a young-adult mystery/suspense novel by American author Karen M. McManus. It is her debut novel, originally published in the US by Delacorte Press, an imprint of Penguin Random House, on May 30, 2017. It was followed by two sequels: One of Us Is Next, published on January 7, 2020, and One of Us Is Back, published on July 23, 2023.

The book uses multiperspectivity to show the points of view of all four student suspects. It has received several accolades including a five-year run on The New York Times Best Seller list.

== Plot ==
At Bayview High, Bronwyn, Simon, Nate, Cooper, and Addy attend detention after a teacher found cell phones in each of their school bags, against his strict no-phone policy. All of the students claim that the phones are not theirs and that someone has planted them there to get them in trouble. Commotion in the school parking lot causes the detention monitor to leave the room. Creator of 'About That', an app that reveals secrets about students at Bayview High, Simon begins a speech about the other four students and how he, through his app, is the omniscient narrator. He drinks tap-water from a plastic cup and suffers a fatal allergic reaction due to his peanut allergy. The others attempt to help, but Simon dies in the hospital.

Initially, the incident is considered an accident, but after a Tumblr post claiming that Simon's death was planned and the killer watched him die, the police investigate, discovering an unpublished post by Simon containing secrets of the other four students. Each of the secrets would affect the students' future: Bronwyn's cheating in chemistry class could impact her college applications; Nate's repeated misdemeanor could send him to jail; Addy's infidelity might end her relationship with boyfriend Jake; and the accusation of steroid use could halt Cooper's potential baseball career. The four are initially suspicious of one another but begin to grow closer due to their shared situation.

The investigation receives media attention and the four are dubbed the "Bayview Four." After Simon's funeral, his post is leaked and the rest of the school learns the four's secrets. Bronwyn's parents are disappointed, Nate's house is searched for drugs, Addy's relationship ends, and Cooper's performance is investigated.

Addy befriends Janae, Simon's friend. Bronwyn and Nate, romantically involved, encounter his mother, who he claimed was dead, but who had in fact suffered from bipolar disorder and drug addiction, now claiming to be sober and wishing to reconcile with her son. An encrypted file regarding Cooper is opened by the police, revealing that the steroid accusations are false and that Cooper is actually gay. This in turn outs him, causing a rift between Cooper and his father, who is homophobic. When Cooper is bullied verbally in the cafeteria after this news is leaked, Nate defends him, and the group sits together, demonstrating their new solidarity and friendship. Evidence is found tying Nate to the murder and he is arrested. Bronwyn contacts a lawyer.

Janae has been absent at school and unresponsive to texts, so Addy goes to her home, where Janae confesses that Simon had been frustrated and angry for years that he was not more popular in high school, and so he rigged the Junior prom to become King. Addy's ex Jake heard Simon bragging about the plan, and Simon was afraid he would be exposed, so he revealed Addy's infidelity to Jake. Simon then enlisted Jake's help with his (Simon's) suicide plan, telling Jake he could get even by framing Addy as Simon's murderer. Janae was supposed to plant the evidence on Addy, but when she couldn't bring herself to do it, she planted it on Nate instead. Since Simon's death, Jake been harassing Janae for ruining the plan, and he arrives while Addy is still there. Addy attempts to record Jake and Janae's conversation as evidence, but is discovered. Jake chases Addy into the woods, attempting to murder her by cracking her skull on a rock, but is knocked out by Cooper, who had accompanied Addy and witnessed Jake's arrival.

Jake is taken into custody. Janae accepts a plea bargain for her involvement, and Nate is released but is shaken from his time in the juvenile detention center, rejecting Bronwyn's concern and breaking off their relationship. Addy heals in the hospital and after she agrees to live with her sister. Cooper's college options begin to reappear, and his relationship with his father starts to improve. Bronwyn applies to Yale, and she casually begins dating someone new. She later finds Nate waiting for her after a major piano recital, where he apologizes for dismissing her. The story ends as she accepts his offer to a movie.

== Characters ==
=== Main characters ===
- Bronwyn Rojas: One of the four point-of-view characters; the 'brain'. Is an overachiever and Yale-hopeful from a well-to-do family who are also Ivy League graduates. She is a member, and often founder, of several after-school clubs. Her mother is white, a 4th generation Irish, and her father is Colombian, making Bronwyn half Irish and Latina. She has a good relationship with her younger sister, Maeve, and is protective of her. Her primary secret is she cheated on her chemistry test in order to maintain her straight-A status, which she fears will impact her college dreams. It is later revealed that she left a threatening message to Simon after he posted an "About That" post about her sister.
- Nathaniel "Nate" Macauley: One of the four point-of-view characters; the 'criminal'. Is a 'bad boy' who is on probation for selling drugs. He lives with his alcoholic father after his bipolar, drug-addicted mother left and supposedly died several years ago. Their primary source of income is from a disability allowance after his father's work injury and is the reason Nate sells drugs. He eventually falls in love with Bronwyn and they date. His primary secret is that he has been continuing to sell drugs. It is also later revealed that his mother is still alive. Nate has a lizard named Stan.
- Adelaide "Addy" Prentiss: One of the four point-of-view characters; the 'princess'. Is one of the popular students at the school. She is besotted with her boyfriend, Jake, but her secret is that she cheated on him with TJ, another boy within their friendship group, while Jake was on holiday. She eventually confesses to Jake, who breaks up with her. She is comforted by her older sister, Ashton, who helps her through the break-up and with her self-discovery.
- Cooper Clay: One of the four point-of-view characters; the 'jock'. He is a promising baseball star who is accused of steroid use by Simon's post. It is later revealed that the original post was edited and his secret removed, but it eventually comes to light that he is gay. He plays a crucial role in the climax of the book.

=== Other characters ===
- Simon Kelleher: Self-proclaimed omniscient narrator and creator of About That, the gossip app revolving around the students of the fictional American high school, Bayview High. He is noted to have depression. His death acts as a catalyst for the events of the story, and the rumors and secrets told in his app are what implicate the others in detention as suspects for his murder.
- Maeve Rojas: Bronwyn's younger sister. She is an intellect and takes a proactive role alongside Bronwyn in trying to solve the murder. She has also been featured in a post by Simon. She suffered from leukemia at the age of seven.
- Jake Riordan: Addy's boyfriend and an old friend of Simon's, "who is a complete control freak", and when Addy's secret comes to light, he breaks up with her. Jake serves as the book's main antagonist, as he and Simon conspire to frame the Bayview Four for the latter's death.
- Ashton Prentiss: Addy's older sister. She has a rocky relationship with her husband Charlie, so spends a lot of time at the family home. She dislikes Jake and the way he treats Addy.
- Janae Vargas: Simon's best friend. She plays a crucial role in the climax. She becomes friends with Addy. She is insecure.
- Eli Kleinfelter: Lawyer who works for the pro bono legal group Until Proven. Bronwyn reaches out to him to defend Nate because he has no lawyer.
- Kris Becker: Cooper's secret boyfriend. He plays a crucial role in helping to decode the mystery.
- TJ Forrester: A student of Bayview High, whom Addy cheated on Jake with.
- Mikhail Powers: A reporter who takes an interest in Simon's case.
- Mr. Avery: A strict teacher in Bayview High.
- Vanessa: Addy's enemy who relentlessly mocks her after her secret comes out.
- Luis Santos: Cooper's best friend and one of the only people to stand by his side after his secret comes out.
- Ellen Macauley: Nate's mother, a bipolar addict who abandoned him and later rejoined his family after she found out Nate was being investigated for murder.
- Keely Soria: Cooper's ex-girlfriend, who he pretended to like so he wouldn't be found out for being gay.
- Evan Neiman: Bronwyn's ex-boyfriend after Nate thought that they weren't compatible.
- Amber: Nate's fling before he met Bronwyn.

== Reception ==
Reception of One of Us Is Lying has been mostly positive, receiving multiple awards and nominations, primarily within the Young Adult category. Reviewer Mary Cosola of Common Sense Media comments that the plot "raises lots of ethical questions" and "provides good discussion topics", receiving an overall rating of four-stars, with an age rating of 14+. Nivea Serrao of Entertainment Weekly praises the author for the nuanced characters and their development, and for challenging the initial stereotypes, but notes that the slow reveal of the secrets leaves the reader with less time to engage with the ending's more fully developed characters. USA Today said "This is no ordinary whodunit, and the author finds a way to make the resolution both surprising and relevant." Kirkus Reviews acknowledges the "insights into common adolescent struggles" and "opportunities for self-reflection" for young readers, also rating the book for readers between 14 and 18, however criticizes that author's use of language and the plot, which they suggest "border on cliché". It also mentions how, although Bronwyn, Maeve, and their father's side of the family are Colombian, the cast is predominantly white.

One of Us Is Lying has been described on several occasions as a cross between The Breakfast Club and Pretty Little Liars.

=== Awards and recognition ===
- New York Times bestseller for 267 weeks
- ABA IndieBound bestseller
- USA Today bestseller
- A New York Public Library's Best Book for Teens selection
- A YALSA 2018 Teens' Top Ten selection
- A YALSA 2018 Quick Pick for Reluctant Young Adult Readers
- An Entertainment Weekly Best YA Book of the Year selection
- A PopCrush Best Young Adult Book of the Year selection
- A BuzzFeed Best YA Book of the Year selection
- Teen Reader's Choice Award for Chignecto-Central Regional Centre for Education

Nominations:

- A YALSA Top Ten Best Fiction Book nominee
- A CBC Teen Choice Book Award nominee
- A Goodreads Best Young Adult Book of the Year nominee

== Sequels ==
A sequel, One of Us Is Next, was published by Delacorte Press on January 7, 2020. Set 18 months later, the novel follows the residents of Bayview as someone starts playing a sinister game of truth or dare. A second and final sequel, One of Us Is Back, was published by Delacorte Press on July 23, 2023.

== Television adaptation ==
A television series based on the novel was originally in development from E! in September 2017. However, the project was moved to NBCUniversal, who gave it a pilot order in August 2019 for Peacock. After the pilot was filmed in November 2019, the project was given a series order in August 2020 for a total of eight episodes. The remaining seven episodes were filmed in New Zealand. The series premiered on October 7, 2021. The show's second season premiered on October 20, 2022. The series made its linear premiere on E!, the network it originally was pitched for, on October 22, 2022.
