= All American (TV series) season 1 =

American sports drama TV show

All American
- Season 1
- Starring: Daniel Ezra; Bre-Z; Greta Onieogou; Samantha Logan; Michael Evans Behling; Cody Christian; Karimah Westbrook; Monét Mazur; Jalyn Hall; Taye Diggs
- No. of episodes: 16

Release
- Original network: The CW
- Original release: October 10, 2018 – March 20, 2019

Season chronology
- Next → Season 2

The first season of the American sports drama television series All American premiered on The CW on October 10, 2018 and ended on March 20, 2019 after 16 episodes.

The series follows the lives of a group of people from both Crenshaw and Beverly Hills and features an ensemble cast starring Daniel Ezra in the lead role as well as Bre-Z, Greta Onieogou, Samantha Logan, Michael Evans Behling, Cody Christian, Karimah Westbrook, Monet Mazur, Taye Diggs and Jalyn Hall.

== Premise ==
When a high school American football player from South L.A. is recruited to play for Beverly Hills High, the wins, losses and struggles of two families from vastly different worlds—Crenshaw and Beverly Hills—begin to collide. Inspired by the life of pro football player Spencer Paysinger.

== Cast and Characters ==
=== Main ===
- Daniel Ezra as Spencer James
- Bre-Z as Tamia "Coop" Cooper
- Greta Onieogou as Layla Keating
- Samantha Logan as Olivia Baker
- Michael Evans Behling as Jordan Baker
- Cody Christian as Asher Adams
- Karimah Westbrook as Grace James
- Monet Mazur as Laura Baker
- Jalyn Hall as Dillon James (Note: Credited as main cast starting with the second episode.)
- Taye Diggs as Billy Baker

=== Recurring ===
- Hunter Clowdus as JJ Parker
- Spence Moore II as Chris Jackson
- Demetrius Shipp Jr. as Tyrone Morris
- Chelsea Tavares as Patience Robinson
- Jay Reeves as Shawn Scott
- Brent Jennings as Willy Baker
- Emily Levine as Lucy
- Michelle Hayden as Ripley
- Casper Van Dien as Harold Adams
- Mitchell Edwards as Cameron
- Chad L. Coleman as Corey James
- Bill Lee Brown as Alvin Washington
- Jordan Belfi as Principal Ed Landon
- Judith Scott as Janelle Cooper
- James Black as Reggie Cooper
- Kareem Grimes as Cordell "Preach" Simms
- Michael Wayne Williams as Young Spencer James

== Episodes ==
No. overall	No. in season	Title	Directed by	Written by	Original release date	Prod. code	U.S. viewers (millions)
1	1	"Pilot"	Rob Hardy	April Blair	October 10, 2018	T15.10151	0.69
Spencer James, an ambitious American football player from South Los Angeles, is offered a scholarship to Beverly Hills High School when the coach Billy Baker notices his ability. He is torn between his two worlds, as his mother and brother both want him to relocate while his friend Coop struggles with gangs and his cultural shift in lifestyles. He also struggles with his father's abandonment for a coaching job. On his first day, he plays exceptionally well much to the dismay of Asher while Spencer gets close with his girlfriend Layla who is extremely wealthy and takes a liking to him. However, Billy's daughter Olivia seems to be more interested in him. Soon Spencer learns of boosters coming in to watch him play American football but a party leads to him drinking too much and he embarrasses himself during the game. At the end of the episode, Spencer is forced to move into the Baker household while Billy shows up at Spencer's home and says to his mother that they need to tell Spencer the truth.
2	2	"99 Problems"	David McWhirter	April Blair & Mike Herro & David Straus	October 17, 2018	T13.21352	0.61
Spencer continues to live within the household but Billy's constant attention to Spencer causes a rift between his relationship with his son Jordan and Olivia with Asher becoming aggressive towards him because of his interest towards Layla. Spencer continues to travel down South but his friend Coop continues to hang out with gang member Shawn and forced to pledge loyalty by dropping off what is supposed to be drugs but actually a gift to an ex-member's grandmother and soon informs Spencer that he has to live his own life. His constant visits also worry Grace as she wants what's best for him. At scouting night, Asher's father soon disrupts the scene after his son is injured earlier on accidentally by Spencer and announces that Spencer has been staying in the Baker household. A confrontation between Shawn and Spencer and an injury leads to Beverly Hills losing the game.
3	3	"i"	Rob Hardy	Nkechi Okoro Carroll	October 24, 2018	T13.21353	0.76
At an American football session, Asher continues to grow frustrated with Spencer and soon creates a meme to ridicule him and sends it across the school. Meanwhile, Coop begins falling for a girl named Patience at her mother's church choir soon revealed to be the reason that she hasn't come out as lesbian due to the religious belief's of her family. The tensions between Asher and Spencer increase when they attempt to fight at a session and soon Jordan experiences Spencer's former life in South LA before Beverly after defending Spencer against Asher. Olivia and Layla try to reconcile after being paired for an English project. Jordan experiences police racism-based treatment after being harassed and Billy soon becomes hurt that his son wasn't aware of the prejudice. Jordan goes to a barber with his dad but finds his old high school yearbook revealing that his father dated Grace James, Spencer's mother.
4	4	"Lose Yourself"	Elodie Keene	John A. Norris	November 7, 2018	T13.21354	0.75
5	5	"All We Got"	Rose Troche	Robert D. Doty & Lorna Osunsanmi	November 14, 2018	T13.21355	0.67
6	6	"The Choice Is Yours"	Benny Boom	Mike Herro & David Strauss & J. Stone Alston	November 28, 2018	T13.21356	0.75
7	7	"California Love"	Dawn Wilkinson	Nkechi Okoro Carroll & Michael Bhim	December 5, 2018	T13.21357	0.66
8	8	"Homecoming"	Rob Hardy	April Blair	December 12, 2018	T13.21358	0.70
9	9	"Keep Ya Head Up"	Kevin Rodney Sullivan	John A. Norris	January 16, 2019	T13.21359	0.69
10	10	"m.A.A.d. city"	Darren Grant	Natalie Abrams & Cam'ron Moore	January 23, 2019	T13.21360	0.71
11	11	"All Eyez on Me"	Michael Schultz	J. Stone Alston & Robert D. Doty	January 30, 2019	T13.21361	0.77
12	12	"Back in the Day"	Elizabeth Allen Rosenbaum	Nkechi Okoro Carroll & Lorna Osunsanmi	February 6, 2019	T13.21362	0.57
Coop struggles to keep Shawn's old rental properly as she isn't fully emancipated from her mother but her father managed to reconcile with his ex wife and make her at least sign the emancipation paper with him, while Olivia threatens to relapse back to her 2017 self due to her being abandoned during playoffs and her mother's district attorney promotion campaign period, while Kia also ended her relationship with Spencer during that same time after she witnessed him fighting, and he almost started a fight again with Asher, worrying he and Layla could be back together.
13	13	"Legacy"	Salli Richardson-Whitfield	John A. Norris	February 27, 2019	T13.21363	0.61
14	14	"Regulate"	Geoff Sholtz	Jameal Turner	March 6, 2019	T13.21364	0.59
15	15	"Best Kept Secret"	Michael Schultz	Mike Herro & David Strauss	March 13, 2019	T13.21365	0.60
16	16	"Championships"	David McWhirter	Nkechi Okoro Carroll & Michael Bhim	March 20, 2019	T13.21366	0.54
Spencer must face his former team at South Crenshaw High in the state championship game. Coop finally executes the plan to subdue Tyrone. In the end, Spencer's dad becomes the new American football coach for South Crenshaw High School and wants Spencer to come back home to play for the team. Spencer must make the decision to either stay at Beverly or go back to Crenshaw.

== Production ==
=== Development ===
In September 2017, it was announced that the CW veteran Greg Berlanti had two pilots in development for the network, one of which inspired by the life of NFL football player Spencer Paysinger. It was also revealed that April Blair would write and executive produce the untitled project, with Berlanti and Sarah Schechter executive producing as well. A pilot for the potential series, then called Spencer, was ordered in January 2018 and subsequently picked up to series on May 11, 2018. On October 2, 2018, it was reported that Blair had stepped down as showrunner due to "personal reasons" and was subsequently replaced by co-executive producer Nkechi Okoro Carroll, who was also made an executive producer. On October 8, 2018, The CW ordered five additional scripts for the series. On November 8, 2018, The CW ordered an additional three episodes of the series, bringing the first season total up to 16 episodes.

=== Casting ===
On February 22, 2018, Taye Diggs was cast as Billy Baker, followed a week later by Samantha Logan cast as Olivia Baker, his daughter. The rest of the cast was filled out through mid-March, with Bre-Z and Greta Onieogou cast on March 15, 2018 as characters Tamia Cooper and Layla Keating, respectively, and Monet Mazur, Michael Evans Behling and Cody Christian cast the next day to play Laura Fine-Baker, Olivia's mother, Jordan Baker, Olivia's brother, and Asher, respectively. Karimah Westbrook was cast as Grace James on March 19, 2018 and British actor Daniel Ezra was cast in the lead role of Spencer James on March 21, 2018. On May 31, 2018, Jalyn Hall was promoted to a series regular as Dillon, Spencer's little brother.

== Reception ==
=== Critical response ===
On review aggregator website Rotten Tomatoes, the season holds an approval rating of 92%, based on 25 reviews, and an average rating of 6.90/10. The website's critical consensus reads, "All American's ambitious attempts to tackle class struggles and classroom drama largely play thanks to its winning cast—an auspicious start to a promising new series". Metacritic, which uses a weighted average, assigned a score of 63 out of 100 based on 15 critics, indicating "generally favorable" reviews.

== Ratings ==
Viewership and ratings per episode of All American (TV series) season 1
No.	Title	Air date	Rating/share (18–49)	Viewers (millions)	DVR (18–49)	DVR viewers (millions)	Total (18–49)	Total viewers (millions)
1	"Pilot"	October 10, 2018	0.2	0.69	0.1	0.37	0.3	1.06
2	"99 Problem"	October 17, 2018	0.2	0.61	0.1	0.37	0.3	0.98
3	"i"	October 24, 2018	0.3	0.76	0.1	0.44	0.4	1.21
4	"Lose Yourself"	November 7, 2018	0.3	0.75	0.2	0.41	0.5	1.16
5	"All We Got"	November 14, 2018	0.3	0.67	0.1	0.45	0.4	1.12
6	"The Choice Is Yours"	November 28, 2018	0.3	0.75	0.1	0.43	0.4	1.18
7	"California Love"	December 5, 2018	0.2	0.66	0.2	0.40	0.4	1.06
8	"Homecoming"	December 12, 2018	0.2	0.70	0.2	0.35	0.4	1.05
9	"Keep Ya Head Up"	January 16, 2019	0.2	0.69	0.1	0.34	0.3	1.03
10	"m.A.A.d. city"	January 23, 2019	0.2	0.71	0.2	0.41	0.4	1.12
11	"All Eyez on Me"	January 30, 2019	0.2	0.77	0.2	0.31	0.4	1.08
12	"Back in the Day"	February 6, 2019	0.2	0.57	0.1	0.40	0.3	0.97
13	"Legacy"	February 27, 2019	0.2	0.61	0.2	0.39	0.4	1.00
14	"Regulate"	March 6, 2019	0.2	0.59	0.1	0.38	0.3	0.97
15	"Best Kept Secret"	March 13, 2019	0.2	0.60	0.2	0.41	0.4	1.01
16	"Championships"	March 20, 2019	0.2	0.54	0.1	0.34	0.3	0.88
