= List of All American episodes =

All American is an American sports drama television series created by April Blair and inspired by the life of professional American football player Spencer Paysinger which aired on The CW.

During the course of the series, 132 episodes of All American aired over eight seasons, between October 10, 2018, and September 28, 2026.

== Series overview ==
Season	Episodes	Originally released	
Season	Episodes	First released	Last released
1	16	October 10, 2018	March 20, 2019
2	16	October 7, 2019	March 9, 2020
3	19	January 18, 2021	July 19, 2021
4	20	October 25, 2021	May 23, 2022
5	20	October 10, 2022	May 15, 2023
6	15	April 1, 2024	July 15, 2024
7	13	January 29, 2025	May 5, 2025
8	13	July 13, 2026	September 28, 2026

== Episodes ==
=== Season 1 (2018–19) ===
No. overall	No. in season	Title	Directed by	Written by	Original release date	Prod. code	U.S. viewers (millions)
1	1	"Pilot"	Rob Hardy	April Blair	October 10, 2018	T15.10151	0.69
2	2	"99 Problems"	David McWhirter	April Blair & Mike Herro & David Straus	October 17, 2018	T13.21352	0.61
3	3	"i"	Rob Hardy	Nkechi Okoro Carroll	October 24, 2018	T13.21353	0.76
4	4	"Lose Yourself"	Elodie Keene	John A. Norris	November 7, 2018	T13.21354	0.75
5	5	"All We Got"	Rose Troche	Robert D. Doty & Lorna Osunsanmi	November 14, 2018	T13.21355	0.67
6	6	"The Choice Is Yours"	Benny Boom	Mike Herro & David Strauss & J. Stone Alston	November 28, 2018	T13.21356	0.75
7	7	"California Love"	Dawn Wilkinson	Nkechi Okoro Carroll & Michael Bhim	December 5, 2018	T13.21357	0.66
8	8	"Homecoming"	Rob Hardy	April Blair	December 12, 2018	T13.21358	0.70
9	9	"Keep Ya Head Up"	Kevin Rodney Sullivan	John A. Norris	January 16, 2019	T13.21359	0.69
10	10	"m.A.A.d. city"	Darren Grant	Natalie Abrams & Cam'ron Moore	January 23, 2019	T13.21360	0.71
11	11	"All Eyez on Me"	Michael Schultz	J. Stone Alston & Robert D. Doty	January 30, 2019	T13.21361	0.77
12	12	"Back in the Day"	Elizabeth Allen Rosenbaum	Nkechi Okoro Carroll & Lorna Osunsanmi	February 6, 2019	T13.21362	0.57
13	13	"Legacy"	Salli Richardson-Whitfield	John A. Norris	February 27, 2019	T13.21363	0.61
14	14	"Regulate"	Geoff Sholtz	Jameal Turner	March 6, 2019	T13.21364	0.59
15	15	"Best Kept Secret"	Michael Schultz	Mike Herro & David Strauss	March 13, 2019	T13.21365	0.60
16	16	"Championships"	David McWhirter	Nkechi Okoro Carroll & Michael Bhim	March 20, 2019	T13.21366	0.54

=== Season 2 (2019–20) ===
No. overall	No. in season	Title	Directed by	Written by	Original release date	Prod. code	U.S. viewers (millions)
17	1	"Hussle & Motivate"	Rob Hardy	Nkechi Okoro Carroll	October 7, 2019	T13.22201	0.88
18	2	"Speak Ya Clout"	Michael Schultz	Mike Herro & David Strauss	October 14, 2019	T13.22202	0.69
19	3	"Never No More"	Sheelin Choksey	Jameal Turner	October 21, 2019	T13.22203	0.68
20	4	"They Reminisce Over You"	Gregg Simon	John A. Norris	October 28, 2019	T13.22204	0.71
21	5	"Bring the Pain"	David McWhirter	Robert D. Doty	November 11, 2019	T13.22205	0.72
22	6	"Hard Knock Life"	Kristin Windell	J. Stone Alston & Michael Bhim	November 18, 2019	T13.22206	0.68
23	7	"Coming Home"	Benny Boom	Nkechi Okoro Carroll & Lorna Osunsanmi	November 25, 2019	T13.22207	0.68
24	8	"Life Goes On"	Avi Youbian	John A. Norris & Laura Nava	December 2, 2019	T13.22208	0.70
25	9	"One of Them Nights"	Erica Watson	Jameal Turner & Cam'ron Moore	January 20, 2020	T13.22209	0.64
26	10	"Protect Ya Neck"	Dawn Wilkinson	Mike Herro & David Strauss	January 27, 2020	T13.22210	0.66
27	11	"Crossroads"	Ryan Zaragoza	Robert D. Doty & Lorna Osunsanmi	February 3, 2020	T13.22211	0.79
28	12	"Only Time Will Tell"	Kelli Williams	John A. Norris	February 10, 2020	T13.22212	0.78
29	13	"The Art of Peer Pressure"	David McWhirter	Jameal Turner & Micah Cyrus	February 17, 2020	T13.22213	0.72
30	14	"Who Shot Ya"	Nikhil Paniz	Michael Bhim & Cam'ron Moore	February 24, 2020	T13.22214	0.74
31	15	"Stakes Is High"	David Crabtree	Mike Herro & David Strauss & J. Stone Alston	March 2, 2020	T13.22215	0.76
32	16	"Decisions"	Michael Schultz	Nkechi Okoro Carroll & Carrie Gutenberg	March 9, 2020	T13.22216	0.70

=== Season 3 (2021) ===
No. overall	No. in season	Title	Directed by	Written by	Original release date	Prod. code	U.S. viewers (millions)
33	1	"Seasons Pass"	Michael Schultz	Nkechi Okoro Carroll	January 18, 2021	T13.22501	1.05
34	2	"How to Survive in South Central"	Michael Schultz	Mike Herro & David Strauss	January 25, 2021	T13.22502	0.82
35	3	"High Expectations"	Kristin Windell	John A. Norris	February 1, 2021	T13.22503	0.66
36	4	"My Mind's Playing Tricks on Me"	Kelli Williams	Jameal Turner	February 8, 2021	T13.22504	0.80
37	5	"How Come"	Kelli Williams	Robert D. Doty	February 15, 2021	T13.22505	0.75
38	6	"Teenage Love"	Nikhil Paniz	Lorna Osunsanmi & Carrie Gutenberg	February 22, 2021	T13.22506	0.74
39	7	"Roll the Dice"	Dawn Wilkinson	Mike Herro & David Strauss	March 1, 2021	T13.22507	0.74
40	8	"Canceled"	Avi Youabian	Jameal Turner & Cam'ron Moore	March 8, 2021	T13.22508	0.79
41	9	"Testify"	Ryan Zaragoza	Robert D. Doty & Micah Cyrus	April 12, 2021	T13.22509	0.68
42	10	"Put Up or Shut Up"	David McWhirter	John A. Norris	April 19, 2021	T13.22510	0.65
43	11	"The Bigger Picture"	Crystle Roberson	Nkechi Okoro Carroll & Micah Cyrus	April 26, 2021	T13.22511	0.62
44	12	"Fight the Power"	Christine Swanson	Lorna Osunsanmi	May 17, 2021	T13.22512	0.63
45	13	"Bring the Noise"	Avi Youabian	Mike Herro & David Strauss	May 24, 2021	T13.22513	0.68
46	14	"Ready or Not"	Nikhil Paniz	Jameal Turner	June 14, 2021	T13.22514	0.74
47	15	"After Hours"	Kelli Williams	Mike Herro & David Strauss	June 21, 2021	T13.22519	0.64
48	16	"No Opp Left Behind"	David McWhirter	Cam'ron Moore & Carrie Gutenberg	June 28, 2021	T13.22515	0.64
49	17	"All American: Homecoming"	Michael Schultz	Nkechi Okoro Carroll	July 5, 2021	T13.22516	0.58
50	18	"Int'l Players Anthem (I Choose You)"	Kristin Windell	Robert D. Doty	July 12, 2021	T13.22517	0.60
51	19	"Surviving the Times"	Michael Schultz	John A. Norris	July 19, 2021	T13.22518	0.72

=== Season 4 (2021–22) ===
No. overall	No. in season	Title	Directed by	Written by	Original release date	Prod. code	U.S. viewers (millions)
52	1	"Survival of the Fittest"	Michael Schultz	Nkechi Okoro Carroll	October 25, 2021	T13.23401	0.64
53	2	"I Ain't Goin' Out Like That"	David McWhirter	Mike Herro & David Strauss	November 1, 2021	T13.23402	0.52
54	3	"All I Need"	Kelli Williams	Robert D. Doty	November 8, 2021	T13.23403	0.56
55	4	"Bird in the Hand"	Ryan Zaragoza	John A. Norris	November 15, 2021	T13.23404	0.60
56	5	"Can It All Be So Simple"	Charissa Sanjarernsuithikul	Jameal Turner	November 22, 2021	T13.23405	0.59
57	6	"Show Me a Good Time"	Kristin Windell	Adrian Dukes	December 6, 2021	T13.23406	0.50
58	7	"Prom Night"	Ryan Zaragoza	Micah Cyrus & Carrie Gutenberg	December 13, 2021	T13.23407	0.70
59	8	"Walk This Way"	Nikhil Paniz	Robert D. Doty & Obiageli Odimegwu	February 21, 2022	T13.23408	0.65
60	9	"Got Your Money"	Dawn Wilkinson	Mike Herro & David Strauss	February 28, 2022	T13.23409	0.54
61	10	"6 'N the Mornin'"	Christine Swanson	John A. Norris	March 7, 2022	T13.23410	0.59
62	11	"Liberation"	Avi Youabian	Adrian Dukes	March 14, 2022	T13.23411	0.67
63	12	"Babies and Fools"	Daniel Ezra	Jameal Turner	March 21, 2022	T13.23412	0.58
64	13	"Jump on It"	Benny Boom	Carrie Gutenberg	March 28, 2022	T13.23413	0.57
65	14	"Changes"	Kelli Williams	Micah Cyrus	April 11, 2022	T13.23414	0.47
66	15	"C.R.E.A.M. (Cash Rules Everything Around Me)"	Michael Schultz	Robert D. Doty	April 18, 2022	T13.23415	0.44
67	16	"Labels"	James Lafferty	Mike Herro & David Strauss	April 25, 2022	T13.23416	0.52
68	17	"Hate Me Now"	Sheelin Choksey	Obiageli Odimegwu & Spencer Paysinger	May 2, 2022	T13.23417	0.45
69	18	"Came Back for You"	Crystle Roberson	Nkechi Okoro Carroll & Jennifer A. King	May 9, 2022	T13.23418	0.42
70	19	"Murder Was the Case"	Ryan Zaragoza	John A. Norris	May 16, 2022	T13.23419	0.55
71	20	"Champagne Glasses"	David McWhirter	Jameal Turner	May 23, 2022	T13.23420	0.67

=== Season 5 (2022–23) ===
No. overall	No. in season	Title	Directed by	Written by	Original release date	Prod. code	U.S. viewers (millions)
72	1	"Ludacrismas"	Nikhil Paniz	Nkechi Okoro Carroll & Carrie Gutenberg	October 10, 2022	T13.24501	0.45
73	2	"Don't Sweat the Technique"	Kelli Williams	Mike Herro & David Strauss	October 17, 2022	T13.24502	0.39
74	3	"Feeling Myself"	Geoff Shotz	Robert D. Doty	October 24, 2022	T13.24503	0.48
75	4	"Turn Down for What"	Christine Swanson	Adrian Dukes	November 7, 2022	T13.24504	0.44
76	5	"I Need Love"	Michael Schultz	John A. Norris	November 14, 2022	T13.24505	0.53
77	6	"Can't Nobody Hold Me Down"	Charissa Sanjarernsuithikul	Micah Cyrus	November 21, 2022	T13.24506	0.45
78	7	"Hate It or Love It"	Jes Macallan	Jameal Turner	November 28, 2022	T13.24507	0.45
79	8	"Feel So Good"	Ryan Zaragoza	Carrie Gutenberg	January 23, 2023	T13.24508	0.50
80	9	"Feel It in the Air"	David McWhirter	Obiageli Odimegwu	January 30, 2023	T13.24509	0.47
81	10	"O.P.P."	David Crabtree	Mike Herro & David Strauss	February 6, 2023	T13.24510	0.50
82	11	"Time"	Dawn Wilkinson	John A. Norris	February 13, 2023	T13.24511	0.55
83	12	"Lost One"	Michael Schultz	Jameal Turner	February 20, 2023	T13.24512	0.67
84	13	"Day Ones"	Daniel Ezra	Nkechi Okoro Carroll & Carrie Gutenberg	March 13, 2023	T13.24513	0.54
85	14	"Make Me Proud"	Jes Macallan	Robert D. Doty	March 20, 2023	T13.24514	0.46
86	15	"United in Grief"	Avi Youabian	Adrian Dukes	March 27, 2023	T13.24515	0.48
87	16	"My Name Is"	Karimah Westbrook	John A. Norris & Chynna Ladage	April 17, 2023	T13.24516	0.44
88	17	"Mask Off"	James Lafferty	Micah Cyrus	April 24, 2023	T13.24517	0.60
89	18	"This Is How We Do It"	Charissa Sanjarernsuithikul	Robert D. Doty & Obiageli Odimegwu	May 1, 2023	T13.24518	0.41
90	19	"Sabotage"	Sudz Sutherland	Jameal Turner	May 8, 2023	T13.24519	0.46
91	20	"Now That We've Found Love"	David McWhirter	Mike Herro & David Strauss	May 15, 2023	T13.24520	0.39

=== Season 6 (2024) ===
No. overall	No. in season	Title	Directed by	Written by	Original release date	Prod. code	U.S. viewers (millions)
92	1	"Things Done Changed"	Nikhil Paniz	Nkechi Okoro Carroll	April 1, 2024	T13.24601	0.37
93	2	"Public Service Announcement"	Michael Schultz	Robert D. Doty	April 8, 2024	T13.24602	0.37
94	3	"Business Is Business"	David McWhirter	Adrian Dukes	April 15, 2024	T13.24603	0.33
95	4	"Black Out"	Ryan Zaragoza	Mike Herro & David Strauss	April 22, 2024	T13.24604	0.37
96	5	"Trust Issues"	Kelli Williams	Micah Cyrus	April 29, 2024	T13.24605	0.41
97	6	"Connection"	Charles Lee Wilson	Carrie Gutenberg	May 6, 2024	T13.24606	0.46
98	7	"Passin' Me By"	Jes Macallan	Jameal Turner	May 13, 2024	T13.24607	0.38
99	8	"Kids See Ghosts"	Sheelin Choksey	Obiageli Odimegwu	May 20, 2024	T13.24608	0.46
100	9	"100%"	Daniel Ezra	Nkechi Okoro Carroll & Chynna Ladage	May 27, 2024	T13.24609	0.34
101	10	"Mass Appeal"	Dawn Wilkinson	Robert D. Doty	June 3, 2024	T13.24610	0.37
102	11	"The Next Episode"	Charissa Sanjarernsuithikul	Adrian Dukes	June 10, 2024	T13.24611	0.47
103	12	"Draft Day"	Dawn Wilkinson	Mike Herro & David Strauss	June 17, 2024	T13.24612	0.40
104	13	"Victory Lap"	Avi Youabian	Jameal Turner	June 24, 2024	T13.24613	0.41
105	14	"I Do (Part I)"	Jes Macallan	Micah Cyrus & Carrie Gutenberg	July 8, 2024	T13.24614	0.40
106	15	"I Do (Part II)"	Michael Schultz	Nkechi Okoro Carroll & Obiageli Odimegwu	July 15, 2024	T13.24615	0.42

=== Season 7 (2025) ===
No. overall	No. in season	Title	Directed by	Written by	Original release date	Prod. code	U.S. viewers (millions)
107	1	"Reborn"	David McWhirter	Nkechi Okoro Carroll	January 29, 2025	T13.24701	0.28
108	2	"Get By"	Michael Schultz	Adrian Dukes	February 10, 2025	T13.24702	0.33
109	3	"Ante Up"	David McWhirter	Robert D. Doty	February 17, 2025	T13.24703	0.32
110	4	"Face Off"	Kristen Windell	Christopher N. Corte	February 24, 2025	T13.24704	0.37
111	5	"I Got a Story to Tell"	Ryan Zaragoza	Micah Cyrus	March 3, 2025	T13.24705	0.30
112	6	"Return of the Mack"	Charles Lee Wilson	David Strauss	March 10, 2025	T13.24706	0.35
113	7	"Boom I Got Your Boyfriend"	Charissa Sanjarernsuithikul	Chynna Ladage	March 17, 2025	T13.24707	0.39
114	8	"Squabble Up"	Dawn Wilkinson	Jameal Turner	March 24, 2025	T13.24708	0.32
115	9	"Shadowboxin'"	Daniel Ezra	Adrian Dukes	March 31, 2025	T13.24709	0.31
116	10	"Just a Friend"	Jes Macallan	Robert D. Doty	April 14, 2025	T13.24710	0.29
117	11	"No Role Modelz"	Karimah Westbrook	Micah Cyrus	April 21, 2025	T13.24711	0.33
118	12	"Don't Hate the Player"	Avi Youabian	David Strauss	April 28, 2025	T13.24712	0.37
119	13	"Award Tour"	Nikhil Paniz	Jameal Turner	May 5, 2025	T13.24713	0.30

=== Season 8 (2026) ===
No. overall	No. in season	Title	Directed by	Written by	Original release date	Prod. code	U.S. viewers (millions)
–	–	"All American: End of Series"	Mike Vanderwyst	N/A	June 22, 2026	N/A	0.20
A special episode serving as a tribute to the series, featuring memorable moments from the past seasons of the show and interviews with various cast members.
120	1	"Rewind"	Nikhil Paniz	Nkechi Okoro Carroll	July 13, 2026	T13.25801	0.41
121	2	"There Is No Competition"	Michael Schultz	Robert D. Doty	July 13, 2026	T13.25802	0.32
122	3	"Fight for Your Right"	David McWhirter	Christopher N. Corte	July 20, 2026	T13.25803	0.31
123	4	"No More Hiding"	Kristin Windell	Chynna Ladage	July 27, 2026	T13.25804	0.33
124	5	"The Truth"	Charissa Sanjarernsuithikul	David Strauss	August 3, 2026	T13.25805	N/A
125	6	"Rebel Without a Pause"	Jes Macallan	Adrian Dukes	August 10, 2026	T13.25806	N/A
126	7	"Somehow Some Way"	Michael Schultz	Jameal Turner	August 17, 2026	T13.25807	N/A
127	8	"Best Friends"	Avi Youabian	Robert D. Doty	August 24, 2026	T13.25808	N/A
128	9	"FEEL"	Ryan Zaragoza	Christopher N. Corte	August 31, 2026	T13.25809	N/A
129	10	"All That I Got Is You"	Dawn Wilkinson	Chynna Ladage	September 7, 2026	T13.25810	N/A
130	11	"Find Your Way Back"	Charles Lee Wilson	Mike Herro & David Strauss	September 14, 2026	T13.25811	N/A
131	12	"Finish Line"	Nikhil Paniz	Adrian Dukes	September 21, 2026	T13.25812	N/A
132	13	"To Live and Die in L.A."	Daniel Ezra	Nkechi Okoro Carroll & Jameal Turner	September 28, 2026	T13.25813	TBD

== Ratings ==
=== Season 1 ===
Viewership and ratings per episode of List of All American episodes
No.	Title	Air date	Rating/share (18–49)	Viewers (millions)	DVR (18–49)	DVR viewers (millions)	Total (18–49)	Total viewers (millions)
1	"Pilot"	October 10, 2018	0.2	0.69	0.1	0.37	0.3	1.06
2	"99 Problem"	October 17, 2018	0.2	0.61	0.1	0.37	0.3	0.98
3	"i"	October 24, 2018	0.3	0.76	0.1	0.44	0.4	1.21
4	"Lose Yourself"	November 7, 2018	0.3	0.75	0.2	0.41	0.5	1.16
5	"All We Got"	November 14, 2018	0.3	0.67	0.1	0.45	0.4	1.12
6	"The Choice Is Yours"	November 28, 2018	0.3	0.75	0.1	0.43	0.4	1.18
7	"California Love"	December 5, 2018	0.2	0.66	0.2	0.40	0.4	1.06
8	"Homecoming"	December 12, 2018	0.2	0.70	0.2	0.35	0.4	1.05
9	"Keep Ya Head Up"	January 16, 2019	0.2	0.69	0.1	0.34	0.3	1.03
10	"m.A.A.d. city"	January 23, 2019	0.2	0.71	0.2	0.41	0.4	1.12
11	"All Eyez on Me"	January 30, 2019	0.2	0.77	0.2	0.31	0.4	1.08
12	"Back in the Day"	February 6, 2019	0.2	0.57	0.1	0.40	0.3	0.97
13	"Legacy"	February 27, 2019	0.2	0.61	0.2	0.39	0.4	1.00
14	"Regulate"	March 6, 2019	0.2	0.59	0.1	0.38	0.3	0.97
15	"Best Kept Secret"	March 13, 2019	0.2	0.60	0.2	0.41	0.4	1.01
16	"Championships"	March 20, 2019	0.2	0.54	0.1	0.34	0.3	0.88

=== Season 2 ===
Viewership and ratings per episode of List of All American episodes
No.	Title	Air date	Rating/share (18–49)	Viewers (millions)	DVR (18–49)	DVR viewers (millions)	Total (18–49)	Total viewers (millions)
1	"Hussle & Motivate"	October 7, 2019	0.3	0.88	0.3	0.66	0.6	1.54
2	"Speak Ya Clout"	October 14, 2019	0.2	0.69	0.3	0.58	0.5	1.27
3	"Never No More"	October 21, 2019	0.2	0.68	0.2	0.52	0.4	1.20
4	"They Reminisce Over You"	October 28, 2019	0.2	0.71	0.2	0.49	0.4	1.20
5	"Bring the Pain"	November 11, 2019	0.2	0.72	0.3	0.54	0.5	1.26
6	"Hard Knock Life"	November 18, 2019	0.2	0.68	0.2	0.48	0.4	1.16
7	"Coming Home"	November 25, 2019	0.2	0.68	0.2	0.59	0.4	1.27
8	"Life Goes On"	December 2, 2019	0.2	0.70	0.2	0.43	0.4	1.13
9	"One of Them Nights"	January 20, 2020	0.2	0.64	0.1	0.35	0.3	0.99
10	"Protect Ya Neck"	January 27, 2020	0.2	0.66	0.2	0.35	0.4	1.01
11	"Tha Crossroads"	February 3, 2020	0.2	0.79	0.2	0.40	0.4	1.19
12	"Only Time Will Tell"	February 10, 2020	0.3	0.78	0.2	0.37	0.5	1.15
13	"The Art of Peer Pressure"	February 17, 2020	0.3	0.72	0.1	0.38	0.4	1.10
14	"Who Shot Ya"	February 24, 2020	0.3	0.74	0.2	0.40	0.5	1.14
15	"Stakes Is High"	March 2, 2020	0.3	0.76	0.2	0.39	0.5	1.15
16	"Decisions"	March 9, 2020	0.2	0.70	0.2	0.43	0.4	1.13

=== Season 3 ===
Viewership and ratings per episode of List of All American episodes
No.	Title	Air date	Rating (18–49)	Viewers (millions)	DVR (18–49)	DVR viewers (millions)	Total (18–49)	Total viewers (millions)
1	"Seasons Pass"	January 18, 2021	0.4	1.05	—N/a	—N/a	—N/a	—N/a
2	"How to Survive in South Central"	January 25, 2021	0.3	0.82	—N/a	—N/a	—N/a	—N/a
3	"High Expectations"	February 1, 2021	0.2	0.66	—N/a	—N/a	—N/a	—N/a
4	"My Mind's Playing Tricks on Me"	February 8, 2021	0.3	0.80	0.3	—N/a	0.6	—N/a
5	"How Come"	February 15, 2021	0.3	0.75	0.3	—N/a	0.6	—N/a
6	"Teenage Love"	February 22, 2021	0.3	0.74	0.2	—N/a	0.5	—N/a
7	"Roll the Dice"	March 1, 2021	0.3	0.74	0.3	—N/a	0.6	—N/a
8	"Canceled"	March 8, 2021	0.3	0.79	0.3	—N/a	0.6	—N/a
9	"Testify"	April 12, 2021	0.2	0.68	0.3	0.59	0.5	1.27
10	"Put Up or Shut Up"	April 19, 2021	0.2	0.65	0.2	0.53	0.4	1.19
11	"The Bigger Picture"	April 26, 2021	0.2	0.62	0.2	0.56	0.5	1.17
12	"Fight the Power"	May 17, 2021	0.2	0.63	0.3	0.63	0.6	1.26
13	"Bring the Noise"	May 24, 2021	0.3	0.68	0.2	0.51	0.5	1.20
14	"Ready or Not"	June 14, 2021	0.3	0.74	0.2	0.50	0.5	1.24
15	"After Hours"	June 21, 2021	0.2	0.64	0.2	0.45	0.4	1.09
16	"No Opp Left Behind"	June 28, 2021	0.2	0.64	0.3	0.61	0.4	1.25
17	"All American: Homecoming"	July 5, 2021	0.2	0.58	0.3	0.55	0.4	1.13
18	"Int'l Players Anthem (I Choose You)"	July 12, 2021	0.2	0.60	0.2	0.47	0.4	1.07
19	"Surviving the Times"	July 19, 2021	0.2	0.72	0.2	0.55	0.5	1.28

=== Season 4 ===
Viewership and ratings per episode of List of All American episodes
No.	Title	Air date	Rating (18–49)	Viewers (millions)	DVR (18–49)	DVR viewers (millions)	Total (18–49)	Total viewers (millions)
1	"Survival of the Fittest"	October 25, 2021	0.2	0.64	—N/a	—N/a	—N/a	—N/a
2	"I Ain't Goin' Out Like That"	November 1, 2021	0.2	0.52	—N/a	—N/a	—N/a	—N/a
3	"All I Need"	November 8, 2021	0.2	0.56	—N/a	—N/a	—N/a	—N/a
4	"Bird in the Hand"	November 15, 2021	0.2	0.60	0.3	0.65	0.5	1.24
5	"Can It All Be So Simple"	November 22, 2021	0.2	0.59	0.2	0.61	0.4	1.19
6	"Show Me a Good Time"	December 6, 2021	0.2	0.50	0.2	0.61	0.4	1.11
7	"Prom Night"	December 13, 2021	0.2	0.70	—N/a	—N/a	—N/a	—N/a
8	"Walk This Way"	February 21, 2022	0.2	0.65	—N/a	—N/a	—N/a	—N/a
9	"Got Your Money"	February 28, 2022	0.1	0.54	—N/a	—N/a	—N/a	—N/a
10	"6 'N the Mornin'"	March 7, 2022	0.2	0.59	0.1	0.46	0.3	1.05
11	"Liberation"	March 14, 2022	0.2	0.67	0.1	0.37	0.3	1.04
12	"Babies and Fools"	March 21, 2022	0.2	0.58	0.2	0.44	0.4	1.02
13	"Jump on It"	March 28, 2022	0.2	0.57	0.1	0.49	0.3	1.05
14	"Changes"	April 11, 2022	0.1	0.47	0.2	0.49	0.3	0.96
15	"C.R.E.A.M. (Cash Rules Everything Around Me)"	April 18, 2022	0.1	0.44	0.1	0.43	0.3	0.87
16	"Labels"	April 25, 2022	0.1	0.52	0.2	0.44	0.3	0.96
17	"Hate Me Now"	May 2, 2022	0.1	0.45	—N/a	—N/a	—N/a	—N/a
18	"Came Back for You"	May 9, 2022	0.1	0.42	—N/a	—N/a	—N/a	—N/a
19	"Murder Was the Case"	May 16, 2022	0.2	0.55	—N/a	—N/a	—N/a	—N/a
20	"Champagne Glasses"	May 23, 2022	0.2	0.67	—N/a	—N/a	—N/a	—N/a

=== Season 5 ===
Viewership and ratings per episode of List of All American episodes
No.	Title	Air date	Rating (18–49)	Viewers (millions)	DVR (18–49)	DVR viewers (millions)	Total (18–49)	Total viewers (millions)
1	"Ludacrismas"	October 10, 2022	0.1	0.45	0.2	0.50	0.3	0.94
2	"Don't Sweat the Technique"	October 17, 2022	0.1	0.39	0.2	0.41	0.3	0.80
3	"Feeling Myself"	October 24, 2022	0.2	0.48	0.2	0.39	0.3	0.87
4	"Turn Down for What"	November 7, 2022	0.1	0.44	0.2	0.39	0.3	0.83
5	"I Need Love"	November 14, 2022	0.2	0.53	0.2	0.38	0.3	0.91
6	"Can't Nobody Hold Me Down"	November 21, 2022	0.1	0.45	—N/a	—N/a	—N/a	—N/a
7	"Hate It or Love It"	November 28, 2022	0.1	0.45	—N/a	—N/a	—N/a	—N/a
8	"Feel So Good"	January 23, 2023	0.1	0.50	—N/a	—N/a	—N/a	—N/a
9	"Feel It in the Air"	January 30, 2023	0.1	0.47	—N/a	—N/a	—N/a	—N/a
10	"O.P.P."	February 6, 2023	0.1	0.50	—N/a	—N/a	—N/a	—N/a
11	"Time"	February 13, 2023	0.2	0.55	—N/a	—N/a	—N/a	—N/a
12	"Lost One"	February 20, 2023	0.2	0.67	—N/a	—N/a	—N/a	—N/a
13	"Day Ones"	March 13, 2023	0.2	0.54	—N/a	—N/a	—N/a	—N/a
14	"Make Me Proud"	March 20, 2023	0.1	0.46	—N/a	—N/a	—N/a	—N/a
15	"United in Grief"	March 27, 2023	0.1	0.48	—N/a	—N/a	—N/a	—N/a
16	"My Name Is"	April 17, 2023	0.1	0.44	—N/a	—N/a	—N/a	—N/a
17	"Mask Off"	April 24, 2023	0.2	0.60	—N/a	—N/a	—N/a	—N/a
18	"This Is How We Do It"	May 1, 2023	0.1	0.41	—N/a	—N/a	—N/a	—N/a
19	"Sabotage"	May 8, 2023	0.1	0.46	—N/a	—N/a	—N/a	—N/a
20	"Now That We've Found Love"	May 15, 2023	0.1	0.39	—N/a	—N/a	—N/a	—N/a

=== Season 6 ===
Viewership and ratings per episode of List of All American episodes
No.	Title	Air date	Rating (18–49)	Viewers (millions)	DVR (18–49)	DVR viewers (millions)	Total (18–49)	Total viewers (millions)
1	"Things Done Changed"	April 1, 2024	0.1	0.37	0.1	0.41	0.2	0.78
2	"Public Service Announcement"	April 8, 2024	0.1	0.37	0.1	0.45	0.2	0.82
3	"Business Is Business"	April 15, 2024	0.1	0.33	0.1	0.41	0.2	0.75
4	"Black Out"	April 22, 2024	0.1	0.37	0.1	0.43	0.2	0.80
5	"Trust Issues"	April 29, 2024	0.1	0.41	0.1	0.33	0.2	0.74
6	"Connection"	May 6, 2024	0.1	0.46	0.1	0.25	0.2	0.71
7	"Passin' Me By"	May 13, 2024	0.1	0.38	0.1	0.33	0.2	0.71
8	"Kids See Ghosts"	May 20, 2024	0.1	0.46	—N/a	—N/a	—N/a	—N/a
9	"100%"	May 27, 2024	0.1	0.34	—N/a	—N/a	—N/a	—N/a
10	"Mass Appeal"	June 3, 2024	0.1	0.37	—N/a	—N/a	—N/a	—N/a
11	"The Next Episode"	June 10, 2024	0.1	0.47	—N/a	—N/a	—N/a	—N/a
12	"Draft Day"	June 17, 2024	0.1	0.40	—N/a	—N/a	—N/a	—N/a
13	"Victory Lap"	June 24, 2024	0.1	0.41	—N/a	—N/a	—N/a	—N/a
14	"I Do (Part I)"	July 8, 2024	0.1	0.40	—N/a	—N/a	—N/a	—N/a
15	"I Do (Part II)"	July 15, 2024	0.1	0.42	—N/a	—N/a	—N/a	—N/a

=== Season 7 ===
Viewership and ratings per episode of List of All American episodes
No.	Title	Air date	Rating (18–49)	Viewers (millions)	DVR (18–49)	DVR viewers (millions)	Total (18–49)	Total viewers (millions)
1	"Reborn"	January 29, 2025	0.0	0.28	0.0	0.17	0.1	0.44
2	"Get By"	February 10, 2025	0.1	0.33	0.1	0.26	0.1	0.59
3	"Ante Up"	February 17, 2025	0.0	0.32	0.1	0.19	0.1	0.51
4	"Face Off"	February 24, 2025	0.1	0.37	0.1	0.27	0.1	0.64
5	"I Got a Story to Tell"	March 3, 2025	0.0	0.30	0.1	0.24	0.1	0.54
6	"Return of the Mack"	March 10, 2025	0.1	0.35	0.1	0.25	0.1	0.60
7	"Boom I Got Your Boyfriend"	March 17, 2025	0.1	0.39	0.1	0.23	0.1	0.62
8	"Squabble Up"	March 24, 2025	0.1	0.32	0.0	0.22	0.1	0.54
9	"Shadowboxin'"	March 31, 2025	0.0	0.31	0.1	0.29	0.1	0.60
10	"Just a Friend"	April 14, 2025	0.1	0.29	0.1	0.25	0.2	0.54
11	"No Role Modelz"	April 21, 2025	0.1	0.33	0.1	0.26	0.1	0.59
12	"Don't Hate the Player"	April 28, 2025	0.1	0.37	0.0	0.19	0.1	0.56
13	"Award Tour"	May 5, 2025	0.1	0.30	0.1	0.23	0.1	0.53

=== Season 8 ===
Viewership and ratings per episode of List of All American episodes
No.	Title	Air date	Rating (18–49)	Viewers (millions)
1	"Rewind"	July 13, 2026	0.1	0.41
2	"There Is No Competition"	July 13, 2026	0.1	0.32
3	"Fight for Your Right"	July 20, 2026	0.1	0.31
4	"No More Hiding"	July 27, 2026	0.1	0.33
