= Crystle Roberson =

African-American filmmaker

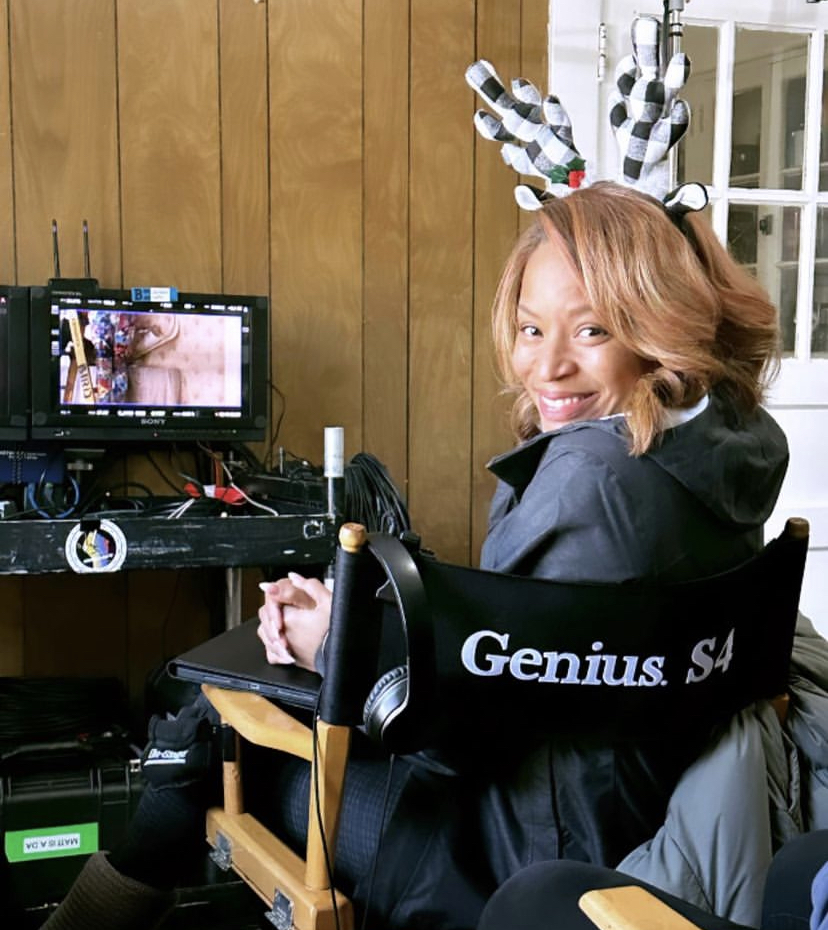
CCR on set December 2022

Crystle Roberson Dorsey is an African-American filmmaker, writer, and television producer. She was honored by Women in Film &Television with the Woman to Watch Award in 2008. She was a director for television series including Greenleaf on the Oprah Winfrey Network, plus All American (CW), Diary of a Future President (Disney+), American Soul (BET), and more.

== Career / film / television ==
Today, Roberson is a member of the Directors Guild of America. Her first award from HBO, Chase, and Kodak for her short film Next Door’s Next (2009), led her to write and direct indie projects including Private Garden with Idris Elba, and The Black Cage with Mykelti Williamson. She directed more shorts such as The End Again featuring Columbus Short and Black Girls Guide to Fertility with Raney Branch.

In 2021, she was Producing Director on ABC's premiere season of QUEENS and 2 episodes of BMF (Black Mafia Family - Season 2) for STARZ.

Recently, she's directing Season 2 of The Gilded Age on HBO, and she's also the Producing Director for 2 episodes on Season 4 of Genius: MLK/X (episode 4 & 6).

== Filmography ==
- Greenleaf - List of Greenleaf episodes - 2019, 2021
- Queens (American TV series) - 2021
- Sacrifice (TV series) 2021
- American Soul - 2020
- BMF (TV series) - 2023
- Long Slow Exhale - 2022
- Delilah (American TV series) - 2021
- Ambitions (TV series) - 2019
- Diary of a Future President - 2021
- Bigger (TV series) - 2019
- All American - List of All American episodes - 2021, 2022
- Power Book III: Raising Kanan - 2025
