= Hunter Clowdus =

American actor

- Born: 1991 (age 34–35); Chattanooga, Tennessee, U.S.
- Education: University of Alabama
- Occupation: Actor
- Years active: 2012–2023

Hunter Clowdus (born 1991) is an American actor best known for his role as JJ Parker in The CW series All American (2018–2023).

== Early life and education ==
Clowdus was born in Chattanooga, Tennessee, and also grew up in nearby Ringgold, Georgia. Following his graduation from David Brainerd Christian School, Clowdus attended the University of Alabama and Chattanooga State Community College for one year.

== Career ==
In 2012, Clowdus worked as a bat boy for the Chattanooga Lookouts. During this time, Clowdus was cast for a role as a Los Angeles Dodgers bat boy in the film 42, a biopic about Jackie Robinson. Later that year, Clowdus booked a small role on two episodes of Teen Wolf, which led him to pursue acting full time. In 2013, Clowdus had uncredited roles in and The Hunger Games: Catching Fire, The Internship, and We Are Men. That same year, he also appeared in an episode of Tattoo Nightmares as "Frat President." Clowdus had an uncredited role as a lifeguard in La La Land in 2016.

In 2018, Clowdus was cast as JJ Parker for a recurring role in The CW series All American. On October 4, 2021, Clowdus' character was upgraded to a main role in season four of the series. Clowdus exited the series at the end of season five, after his character's storyline had "organically wrapped." Clowdus later stated that he did not want to leave the show at the time.

In 2019, Clowdus began streaming on Twitch. Eventually, this led Clowdus to create an athleisure clothing line, Clowdus Clothing. That same year, Clowdus had a role as Chris Walker on Bennett's War and an uncredited role in Isn't It Romantic.

In December 2024, Clowdus announced that he had joined the United States Army.

== Personal life ==
Clowdus is a Christian. During his time filming All American, he resided in Los Angeles.

== Filmography ==
=== Television ===
Year	Title	Role	Notes
2012	Teen Wolf	Bartender #2	2 episodes
2013	We Are Men	Carter's groomsman (uncredited)	1 episode
2013	Tattoo Nightmares	Frat President	1 episode
2013	Beauty Queen Murders	Ricky Rush	1 episode
2014	Mistresses	Bartender (uncredited)	1 episode
2015	The 702	Zach	1 episode
2016	Rizzoli & Isles	Max	1 episode
2016	Broken	Seaton	2 episodes
2017	American Vandal	Van Delorey	2 episodes
2018–2023	All American	JJ Parker	Main role

=== Film ===
Year	Title	Role	Notes
2012	Trouble with the Curve	Yoga Student (uncredited)	
2013	42	Dodger Bat Boy	
2013	The Internship	Valet (uncredited)	
2013	The Hunger Games: Catching Fire	Capitol (uncredited)	
2014	300: Rise of an Empire	Spartan warrior (uncredited)	
2014	Like Sunday, Like Rain	Pete (uncredited)	
2015	Letter Never Sent	Zach	(TV movie)
2016	La La Land	Lifeguard (uncredited)	
2018	Bigger	Fitness guy	
2019	Isn't It Romantic	Harry (uncredited)	
2019	Bennett's War	Chris Walker	
