= Channing Godfrey Peoples =

American writer, director, and producer

- Education: Baylor University (BA); University of Southern California (MFA)
- Occupations: Writer, director, producer
- Years active: 2013–present
- Notable work: Miss Juneteenth
- Spouse: Neil Creque Williams
- Children: 1

Channing Godfrey Peoples is an American writer, director, and producer. Her feature film directorial debut Miss Juneteenth received critical acclaim.

== Early life and education ==
Peoples was raised on the south side of Fort Worth in what she referred to as "Black Texas". Her family regularly attended Black theatre performances, which influenced Peoples to read classic Black literature by writers such as Toni Morrison and Gloria Naylor.

She received her bachelor's degree in theater from Baylor University and her master of fine arts degree from University of Southern California.

== Career ==
=== Miss Juneteenth ===
Peoples began writing Miss Juneteenth in 2013, shortly after completing film school. She was inspired to write the film because she grew up attending Juneteenth celebrations and Miss Juneteenth pageants and the holiday holds great significance for her. She attended the Sundance Creative Producing Summit and other writing workshops to continue to develop the screenplay. When the film was in pre-production, Peoples was named one of Filmmaker Magazine's 25 New Faces of Independent Film 2018. Miss Juneteenth, also Peoples' directorial debut, premiered at Sundance 2020 and was released VOD on Juneteenth of that year. The film received critical acclaim and holds a 99% rating on Rotten Tomatoes.

She cites Julie Dash, Jonathan Demme, and her mentor Charles Burnett as influences.

=== Other work ===
Peoples wrote two episodes of the third season of Queen Sugar.

In January 2021 it was announced that Peoples signed a first look deal with Universal Content Productions. Her first scheduled project is to create a television adaptation of Miss Juneteenth.

Peoples' wrote and directed the short film Doretha's Blues, which debuted at SXSW in 2021. The movie stars Tonea Stewart and follows "a former musician whose son was killed by police and who can no longer find it in her to sing." She was inspired to write Doretha's Blues in the aftermath of Michael Brown's death, as she was interested in the lives of the family left behind. Like Miss Juneteenth, the film is set in Fort Worth, Texas.

== Personal life ==
Peoples is married to producer Neil Creque Williams, whom she met in her graduate program at USC. They have one daughter (b. 2018).

== Filmography ==
=== Film ===
Year	Title	Writer	Director	Producer
2020	Miss Juneteenth	Yes	Yes	Yes
2021	Doretha's Blues	Yes	Yes	No

=== Television ===
Year	Title	Writer	Director	Executive producer
2018	Queen Sugar	Yes (2)	No	No
2021	Generation	No	Yes (1)	No
2022	Roar	No	Yes (1)	No
2024	Genius	No	Yes (1)	Co-executive

== Awards and nominations ==
Year	Award	Category	Nominated work	Result	Ref.
2020	Gotham Independent Film Awards	Bingham Ray Breakthrough Director Award	Miss Juneteenth	Nominated	
2020	SXSW	Louis Black Lone Star Award	Miss Juneteenth	Won	
2020	BlackStar Film Festival	Best Narrative Feature	Miss Juneteenth	Won	
2020	Alliance of Women Film Journalists	Best Woman Director	Miss Juneteenth	Nominated	
2020	National Board of Review	Best Directorial Debut	Miss Juneteenth	Won	
2020	Satellite Awards	Best First Feature	Miss Juneteenth	Won	
2020	Independent Spirit Awards	Best First Feature	Miss Juneteenth	Nominated	
2020	Independent Spirit Awards	Best First Screenplay	Miss Juneteenth	Nominated	
2021	Black Reel Awards	Outstanding Independent Feature	Miss Juneteenth	Nominated	
2021	Black Reel Awards	Outstanding Director	Miss Juneteenth	Nominated	
2021	Black Reel Awards	Outstanding Emerging Director	Miss Juneteenth	Nominated	
2021	Black Reel Awards	Outstanding First Screenplay	Miss Juneteenth	Nominated	
2021	Austin Film Festival	New Voice Award	Miss Juneteenth	Won	
