= Miss Juneteenth =

2020 film by Channing Godfrey Peoples

- Release poster
- Directed by: Channing Godfrey Peoples
- Written by: Channing Godfrey Peoples
- Produced by: Neil Creque Williams; Jeanie Igoe; James M. Johnston; Toby Halbrooks; Tim Headington; Theresa Page
- Starring: Nicole Beharie; Kendrick Sampson; Alexis Chikaeze
- Cinematography: Daniel Patterson
- Edited by: Courtney Ware
- Music by: Emily Rice
- Production companies: Sailor Bear; Ley Line Entertainment
- Distributed by: Vertical Entertainment
- Release dates: January 24, 2020 (Sundance); June 19, 2020 (United States)
- Running time: 103 minutes
- Country: United States
- Language: English
- Budget: $700,000–2.5 million
- Box office: $111,428

Miss Juneteenth is a 2020 American drama film written and directed by Channing Godfrey Peoples and starring Nicole Beharie, Kendrick Sampson, and Alexis Chikaeze. The plot follows a single mom and former teen beauty queen who enters her daughter into the local Miss Juneteenth pageant. The film premiered at the Sundance Film Festival on January 24, 2020, and was released via video on demand on June 19, 2020, coinciding with the 155th anniversary of the historically Black holiday which originated in the south eastern United States.

The film received critical acclaim. It received accolades from South by Southwest, the BlackStar Film Festival, and the National Board of Review. For the role, Nicole Beharie received a Gotham Award for Best Actress.

== Plot ==
Turquoise Jones (Nicole Beharie), is a single mother in a suburb of Fort Worth, Texas. She is the former winner of the local Miss Juneteenth pageant which offers full scholarship to a historically black college. She enters her 15-year-old daughter, Kai (Alexis Chikaeze) in the same pageant despite her daughter's obvious lack of enthusiasm.

While other former Miss Juneteenth winners have gone on to have successful careers, Turquoise's education was derailed by the birth of Kai, which forced her to drop out of college and for a time to work as a stripper. To make ends meet she currently works at a bar and part time as a beautician at a mortuary where the owner is romantically interested in her. However, Turquoise is still in love with Kai's father Ronnie, and the two continue sleeping together despite officially being separated.

Kai struggles with her preparations for the Miss Juneteenth pageant, wanting to pursue dance instead. When her father fails to come through with the money for her pageant dress, she is forced to compete in her mother's old gown.

The Miss Juneteenth pageant goes forward. To Turquoise's surprise, for the talent portion Kai performs Maya Angelou's Phenomenal Woman, the poem that Turquoise performed herself and had been pushing Kai to perform, except set to dance. Turquoise is proud of Kai's performance, but nevertheless Kai fails to even place in the pageant.

After the owner of the bar where she works suffers heart problems, he lets Turquoise know that he must sell the bar. She gives him a counter-proposal, offering to slowly buy out his business. He accepts and Turquoise begins her new life as a businesswoman.

== Cast ==
- Nicole Beharie as Turquoise Jones
- Kendrick Sampson as Ronnie
- Alexis Chikaeze as Kai Marie Jones
- Liz Mikel as Betty Ray
- Marcus Mauldin as Wayman
- Jaime Matthis as Quantavious
- Lori Hayes as Charlotte
- Akron Watson as Bacon
- Phyllis Cicero as Mrs. Washington
- Lisha Hackney as Clarissa

== Production ==
Miss Juneteenth is director Channing Godfrey Peoples' first feature film. She was raised celebrating Juneteenth and attending Miss Juneteenth pageants.

The film marked the return of Nicole Beharie in a starring role, who appeared in few productions after her abrupt departure from Fox series Sleepy Hollow. Beharie discussed being blacklisted after requesting accommodations for an autoimmune disease she developed during the production of the show.

The director of photography was Daniel Patterson, the production designer was Olivia Peebles, and Rachel Dainer-Best was the costume designer. Filming took place during July and August 2019 in Fort Worth, Texas.

== Release ==
Miss Juneteenth premiered at the 2020 Sundance Film Festival in the U.S. Dramatic Competition.

Vertical Entertainment acquired distribution rights to the film in April 2020 and released it digitally on the 155th anniversary of Juneteenth, June 19, 2020.

== Reception ==
=== Box office ===
The film made $20,946 from six theaters in its opening weekend (an average of $3,491 per venue), finishing sixth among reported films.

=== Critical response ===
On the review aggregator website Rotten Tomatoes, the film holds an approval rating of 99% based on 144 reviews, with an average rating of 7.6/10. The website's critics consensus reads, "Like a pageant winner walking across the stage, Miss Juneteenth follows a familiar path – but does so with charm and grace." On Metacritic, the film has a weighted average score of 73 out of 100, based on 27 critics, indicating "generally favorable reviews".

Writing for The New York Times, Lovia Gyarkye praised the film's abundant themes: "The movie tackles multitudinous themes in its roughly 100 minutes, from the significance of Juneteenth, which commemorates the end of slavery in the United States, to the legacy of racism in predatory bank lending practices. But what's most impressive is the amount of space Peoples's black female characters inhabit in the narrative." Angelica Jade Bastién, writing in Vulture, further praised the film's content: "Miss Juneteenth isn't trying to make grand proclamations about what it means to be Black in America today. The film is too smart for such grandstanding. Instead, it revels in watching Black folks just be."

In a review for Variety, Dennis Harvey applauded the film's "basic authenticity that will ring true for many viewers unaccustomed to seeing themselves onscreen" but also noted that the storytelling was "rewarding if somewhat predictable", and could use editing to improve "its sometimes too-leisurely tempo a bit." David Rooney of The Hollywood Reporter wrote positively of the depiction of the mother and daughter: "Whenever Peoples returns her gaze to the intimate bond between Turquoise and Kai, with the push and pull of their relationship, its challenges and rewards, played out with exquisite understatement by Beharie and Chikaeze, this becomes a satisfying portrait of hope and resilience."

== Television adaptation ==
On January 11, 2021 it was announced that NBCUniversal signed a first-look deal with director Channing Godfrey Peoples, and that will include her developing a television adaptation of Miss Juneteenth.

== Awards and nominations ==
Award	Date of ceremony	Category	Nominee(s)	Result	Ref.
Gotham Awards	January 11, 2021	Bingham Ray Breakthrough Director Award	Channing Godfrey Peoples	Nominated	
Gotham Awards	January 11, 2021	Best Actress	Nicole Beharie	Won	
South by Southwest	2020	Louis Black “Lone Star” Award	Channing Godfrey Peoples	Won	
BlackStar Film Festival	August 26, 2020	Best Narrative Feature	Channing Godfrey Peoples	Won	
Independent Spirit Awards	April 22, 2021	Best First Feature	Channing Godfrey Peoples	Nominated	
Independent Spirit Awards	April 22, 2021	Best First Screenplay	Channing Godfrey Peoples	Nominated	
Independent Spirit Awards	April 22, 2021	Best Female Lead	Nicole Beharie	Nominated	
Independent Spirit Awards	April 22, 2021	Best Supporting Female	Alexis Chikaeze	Nominated	
National Board of Review	January 26, 2021	Top Ten Independent Films	Miss Juneteenth	Won	
National Board of Review	January 26, 2021	Best Directorial Debut	Channing Godfrey Peoples	Won	
Satellite Awards	February 15, 2021	Best First Feature	Channing Godfrey Peoples	Won	
Satellite Awards	February 15, 2021	Best Motion Picture - Drama	Miss Juneteenth	Nominated	
Black Reel Awards	April 11, 2021	Outstanding Director	Channing Godfrey Peoples	Nominated	
Black Reel Awards	April 11, 2021	Outstanding Actress	Nicole Beharie	Nominated	
Black Reel Awards	April 11, 2021	Outstanding Supporting Actress	Alexis Chikaeze	Nominated	
Black Reel Awards	April 11, 2021	Outstanding Breakthrough Performance, Female	Alexis Chikaeze	Nominated	
Black Reel Awards	April 11, 2021	Outstanding Ensemble	Tisha Blood, Chelsea Ellis Bloch, Matthew West Taylor	Nominated	
Black Reel Awards	April 11, 2021	Outstanding Independent Film	Channing Godfrey Peoples	Nominated	
Black Reel Awards	April 11, 2021	Outstanding Emerging Director	Channing Godfrey Peoples	Nominated	
Black Reel Awards	April 11, 2021	Outstanding First Screenplay	Channing Godfrey Peoples	Nominated	
Austin Film Critics Association	March 19, 2021	Best Actress	Nicole Beharie	Nominated	
Austin Film Critics Association	March 19, 2021	Best First Film	Miss Juneteenth	Nominated	
NAACP Image Awards	March 27, 2021	Outstanding Independent Motion Picture	Miss Juneteenth	Nominated	
