= Alexis Chikaeze =

American actress

Alexis Chikaeze is an American actress. She made her debut film in Miss Juneteenth and is best known for her role in television series All American.

== Early life and education ==
Chikaeze is from Dallas, Texas, born to Nigerian parents. She began performing at a young age, participating in family shows, pageants, and early acting opportunities that sparked her interest in the craft. She initially enrolled at Howard University to study theatre arts but later transferred to Clark Atlanta University, and eventually to the University of Southern California (USC).

== Career ==
Chikaeze's first major film role was in Miss Juneteenth, where she portrayed Kai, the teenage daughter of a former beauty queen. The film premiered at Sundance and received positive reviews for her performance, earning her a nomination for Best Supporting Actress at the Independent Spirit Awards. In 2024, Chikaeze joined the cast of All American as Amina Simms.

== Filmography ==
=== Film ===
Year	Title	Role	Notes
2020	Miss Juneteenth	Kai	

=== Television ===
Year	Title	Role	Notes
2023	Rap Sh!t	Sade	1 episode
2024-2026	All American	Amina Simms	Main role (season 7–8), guest role (season 6)
