= Nathaniel Logan McIntyre =

American actor (born 2003)

- Born: August 20, 2003 (age 23)
- Occupation: Actor
- Years active: 2014–present

Nathaniel Logan McIntyre (born August 20, 2003) is an American actor best known for his role as Kingston "KJ" Jeremy on The CW series All American.

== Career ==
In 2014, McIntyre played Young Simba in the Broadway musical The Lion King for fourteen months. He was part of the cast that performed at The White House for First Lady Michelle Obama.

From 2019 until 2021, McIntyre played Seren Kelly on the OWN coming-of-age series David Makes Man. McIntyre also appeared in the 2021 film Horror Noire. From 2022 through 2025, McIntyre played Cam on the television series The Equalizer.

In February 2024, McIntyre was cast as Jackie Jackson in Michael, a biopic about Michael Jackson, set to be released in 2026. Joseph David-Jones plays the older version of Jackie in the film.

In September 2024, McIntyre was cast as Kingston "KJ" Jeremy, the new lead character on season seven of The CW series All American. Season seven of the series premiered on February 3, 2025.

== Filmography ==
=== Film ===
Year	Title	Role	Notes
2016	Barry	Kid	
2020	Magic Camp	Theo	
2021	Horror Noire	Derek	
2026	Michael	Jackie Jackson	

=== Television ===
Year	Title	Role	Notes
2010	Celebrity Ghost Stories	Sugar Ray Leonard's Son	
2012–2013	Tickety Toc	Pufferty (voice)	4 episodes
2021	Black-ish	Bradley	2 episodes
2019–2021	David Makes Man	Seren Kelly	2 episodes
2024	Pretty Little Liars: Original Sin	Brody	1 episode
2022–2025	The Equalizer	Cameron	8 episodes
2025–2026	All American	Kingston "KJ" Jeremy	Main role (season 7–8)
2026	Coven Academy	Teese	Recurring role

== See also ==
- Nathaniel Logan McIntyre at IMDb
