= Jalyn Hall =

American actor (born 2006)

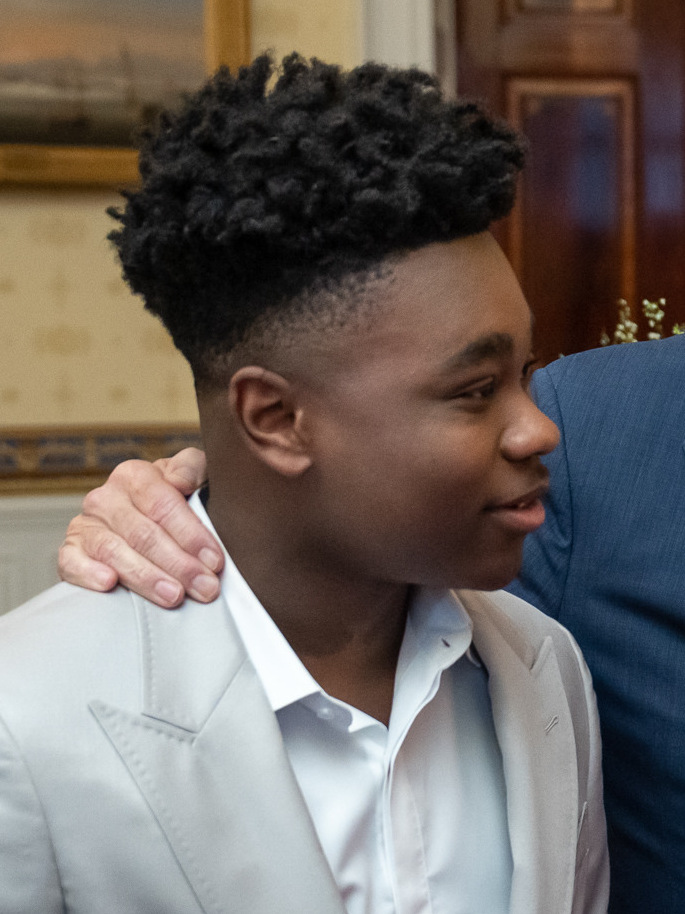
- Hall at the White House in 2023
- Born: December 23, 2006 (age 19); Atlanta, Georgia, U.S.
- Occupation: Actor
- Years active: 2018–present
- Known for: All American; Till

Jalyn Emil Hall (born December 23, 2006) is an American actor best known for his roles as Dillon James on All American and Emmett Till in the 2022 biographical film Till.

== Early life ==
Hall was born and raised in Atlanta, Georgia.

== Career ==
In 2018, Hall was cast as Dillon James in the television series All American.

In 2021, when Hall auditioned for a role in Till, he was not told that the project was about Emmett Till until his second audition. In preparation for filming, Hall met with Till's relatives in Georgia prior to filming. The film premiered in October 2022.

== Personal life ==
Hall's family divides their time between Los Angeles and Atlanta.

== Filmography ==
Film
Year	Title	Role	Notes
2018	The House with a Clock in Its Walls	Devin	
2019	Shaft	Harlem Kid	
2020	John Henry	Deydey	
2020	All Day and a Night	Young Jahkor	
2020	The App That Stole Christmas	Ben Rhome	
2021	Space Jam: A New Legacy	Young Malik (13 Years)	
2022	Bruiser	Darious	
2022	Till	Emmett Till	
2023	Outlaw Johnny Black	Young Johnny Black	

== Television ==
Year	Title	Role	Notes
2017	Star	6 Year Old Cotton	1 episode
2017	The Quad	LeMichael	1 episode
2017	Tales	Kenny	1 episode
2018	Black-ish	8 Year Old Dre	2 episodes
2018	Atlanta	Shawn	1 episode
2018	NCIS: Los Angeles	Derrick	1 episode
2018	Family Time	Theodore	1 episode
2018–2024	All American	Dillon James	Main role
2019-2020	Family Reunion	Grayson	Recurring role
2023	The Crossover	Josh 'Filthy McNasty' Bell	Main role
2024	Fight Night: The Million Dollar Heist	Baby Ray	6 episodes
2026–present	The Fall and Rise of Reggie Dinkins	Carmelo	Main role

== Awards and nominations ==
Year	Association	Category	Work	Result	Ref.
2023	Critics' Choice Movie Awards	Best Young Actor/Actress	Till	Nominated	
