= Chelsea Tavares =

American actress

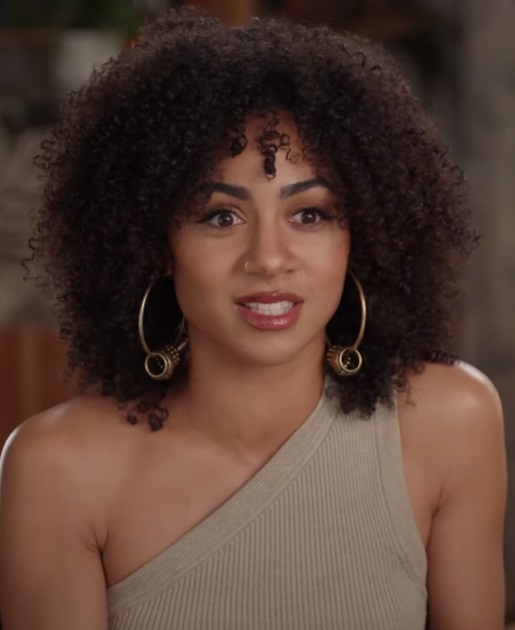
- Tavares in 2024
- Born: Chelsea Royce Tavares; Panorama City, Los Angeles, California
- Occupations: Actress; singer
- Years active: 2000–present
- Children: 1

Chelsea Royce Tavares is an American actress and singer. She is best known for her roles as Cranberry on the Nickelodeon series Unfabulous, Autumn Williams on the Nickelodeon series Just Jordan, Patience Robinson in The CW series All American, and the voice and motion capture for Nora Harris in the video game The Last of Us Part II.

== Early life ==
Tavares' ancestors were from Brava, Cape Verde. Her younger sister is Kylee Russell, also an actress who starred as Karin Daniels in the 2007 Disney television film Jump In! and Eliza in the ‘’Zombies” franchise.

== Career ==
Prior to appearing in Unfabulous, Tavares guest starred in the series The District and The Practice. In 2004, she joined Unfabulous as a recurring cast member in the first season before becoming a series regular the final two seasons. Shortly after, she joined the main cast of another Nickelodeon series Just Jordan, in the show's second and final season. Her other television acting credits include Zeke and Luther, CSI: Miami, The Middle, and Ringer. In 2011, she appeared in the feature film Fright Night. She is currently starring as Patience Robinson in the hit CW Network's series, All American. In video games, she voiced Glory in Fallout 4 and voiced and mo-capped Nora Harris in The Last of Us Part II.

== Filmography ==
=== Film ===
Year	Title	Role	Notes
2007	Crush on U	Natasia	Direct-to-video
2011	Fright Night	Clara	
2012	Amelia's 25th	Actress	
2014	Platinum the Dance Movie	Simone	
2015	Welcome to the Family	Riley	
2015	If Not for His Grace	Older Jacqueline Randolph	
2015	The Sound of Magic	Grace	
2017	Micah and Noel Share an Apartment: An Origin Story	Bria	
2017	Chasing the Blues	Vanessa	
2018	Jump	Kree	Short film
2018	Solace	Jasmine	

=== Television ===
Year	Title	Role	Notes
2001	The District	Angie Dayton	Episode: "The Project"
2003	The Practice	Virginia Carter	Episode: "Baby Love"
2004–2007	Unfabulous	Cranberry St. Claire	Recurring role (season 1); Regular role (seasons 2–3)
2007–2008	Just Jordan	Autumn Williams (season 2)	Regular role
2010	Zeke and Luther	Bonita	Episode: "Double Crush"
2010	CSI: Miami	Tracy Newsom	Episode: "On the Hook"
2011	The Middle	Cheerleader	Episode: "Valentine's Day II"
2011	Ringer	Andrea	3 episodes
2012	Make It or Break It	Jordan Randall	8 episodes
2013	Calvin and Freddie's Cosmic Encounters	Victoria	Episode: "The Invasion"
2015	Bones	Sabrina Clevenger	Episode: "The Baker in the Bits"
2015	A Royal Family Holiday	Kelsey Royal	Television movie
2015	Royal Family Christmas	Kelsey Royal	Television movie
2017	Grown Folks	Alisha Latifah Bronson	Episode: "Guess Who's Coming to Dinner"
2017	Tycoon	Natalie Boyle	9 episodes
2017	Mystic Cosmic Patrol	Emily / Green Patrolman	Episode: "Potty Mouth: Part 1"
2017	Lethal Weapon	Crystal	Episode: "Wreck the Halls"
2018–2026	All American	Patience Robinson	Main role
2019	SMILF	Bebe	Episode: "Smile More if Lying Fails"
2019	Queen of the South	Birdie	6 episodes
2021	Robot Chicken	Aunt Flo, Gina	Voice role; episode: "May Cause the Exact Thing You're Taking This to Avoid"

=== Video games ===
Year	Title	Role	Notes
2000	The Lion King: Simba's Mighty Adventure	Young Nala	Voice
2015	Fallout 4	Glory	Voice
2020	The Last of Us Part II	Nora Harris	Voice and motion capture

== Discography ==
Singles
Year	Single	Album
2010	"Happy"	Non-album song
2012	"Tea Party"	Non-album song
2012	"Beautiful Gangsta" feat. Young Keno	Non-album song
