= Greta Onieogou =

Canadian actress (born 1991)

- Born: 14 March 1991 (age 35); Leningrad, Russian SFSR, Soviet Union (now Saint Petersburg, Russia)
- Citizenship: Canada
- Occupation: Actress
- Years active: 2005–present
- Spouse: Jon Foster

Greta Onieogou (Russian: Грета Онейогоу; born 14 March 1991) is a Canadian actress, best known for her roles as Layla Keating in the All American drama series, Keri Madsen in the CBS series Ransom, Themis in the CBC series Murdoch Mysteries, and as Soraya Duval in the Canadian drama Heartland.

== Early life ==
Onieogou was born in Leningrad, Russian SFSR, Soviet Union, to Nigerian-Russian parents. When Onieogou was five, she moved with her parents to Toronto. She used to be a rhythmic gymnast and worked with Alexandra Orlando for a couple months during her training.

== Career ==
In 2018, Onieogou was cast in the pilot for All American.

In 2019, Onieogou started her own YouTube channel.

== Personal life ==
Onieogou is fluent in English and Russian.

== Filmography ==
Film
Year	Title	Role	Notes
2005	Fever Pitch	Tammy	
2009	Victoria Day	Sara	
2016	Miss Sloane	Greta (CKW Junior)	
2017	Undercover Grandpa	Angie Wagner	
2025	Vipers	Beatrix	Short film

Television
Year	Title	Role	Notes
2006	Degrassi: The Next Generation	Sirina	Episode: "Working for the Weekend"
2009	Overruled!	Vanessa	Episode: "Worlds Collide"
2007–2015	Heartland	Soraya Duval	Recurring role; 50 episodes
2015	Heroes Reborn: Dark Matters	Aly	Recurring role; 6 episodes
2017	Schitt's Creek	Town Council Speaker	Episode: "Opening Night"
2017	Ransom	Keri Madsen	Episode: "Regeneration"
2017	Murdoch Mysteries	Themis	Episode: "Hades Hath No Fury"
2017	Frankie Drake Mysteries	Elsie Thompson	Episode: "Healing Hands"
2018	Workin' Moms	Young Woman #2	Episode: "If Women Had to Give Birth"
2018	Imposters	Front Desk Clerk	Episode: "The World Needs Heroes. Over."
2018	Anne with an E	Ruth	Episode: "The Painful Eagerness of Unfed Hope"
2018–2026	All American	Layla Keating	Main role
2022	All American: Homecoming	Layla Keating	Episode: "Integrity"
