= All American (TV series) =

2018 American sports drama television series

- Genre: Sports drama
- Created by: April Blair
- Showrunners: April Blair; Nkechi Okoro Carroll
- Starring: Daniel Ezra; Bre-Z; Greta Onieogou; Samantha Logan; Michael Evans Behling; Cody Christian; Karimah Westbrook; Monet Mazur; Taye Diggs; Jalyn Hall; Chelsea Tavares; Hunter Clowdus; Osy Ikhile; Alexis Chikaeze; Nathaniel Logan McIntyre; Antonio J. Bell
- Music by: Blake Neely
- Country of origin: United States
- Original language: English
- No. of seasons: 8
- No. of episodes: 132 (list of episodes)

Production
- Executive producers: April Blair; Greg Berlanti; Sarah Schechter; Rob Hardy; Nkechi Okoro Carroll; John A. Norris; Jameal Turner; Mike Herro & David Strauss
- Producers: Robbie Rogers; Robert D. Doty; Jon Wallace; Carl Ogawa; Jennifer Lence; Adrian Dukes; Micah Cyrus
- Cinematography: Ramsey Nickell; Nikhil Paniz; Carlos Arguello; Eriberto Cordero; Eric Laudadio
- Editors: Avi Youabian; Felicia M. Livingston; Finnian Murray; Jessie Murray; Jennifer Hoks; Matthew Prescott; Patrick Brian; Nathan Draper; James A. Lieske; Alexander Aquino-Kaljakin; Megan Daniels; Warren J. Williams
- Running time: 42–49 minutes
- Production companies: Berlanti Productions; April Blair's Company (season 1); CBS Studios (Note: Credited as CBS Television Studios for the first two seasons.); Warner Bros. Television

Original release
- Network: The CW
- Release: October 10, 2018 – September 28, 2026

Related
- All American: Homecoming

All American is an American sports drama television series created by April Blair which premiered on The CW on October 10, 2018 and features an ensemble cast starring Daniel Ezra in the lead role as well as Bre-Z, Greta Onieogou, Samantha Logan, Michael Evans Behling, Cody Christian, Karimah Westbrook, Monet Mazur, Taye Diggs, Jalyn Hall, Chelsea Tavares, Hunter Clowdus, Osy Ikhile, Alexis Chikaeze, Nathaniel Logan McIntyre and Antonio J. Bell.

All American is inspired by the life of professional American football player Spencer Paysinger and follows the lives of a group of people from both Crenshaw and Beverly Hills after teen Spencer James (Ezra), a rising star football player from Crenshaw whose dream is to make it to the NFL, is recruited by coach Billy Baker (Diggs) to play for his high school team in Beverly Hills.

The series was met with positive reviews from both critics and audiences, with praise being aimed in particular at the football sequences and performances of Ezra, Christian and Diggs. However, it initially got weak television ratings on its broadcast network, but was a sleeper hit when released on Netflix, which helped both to boost its linear ratings and prevent its cancellation.

The series ran for 132 episodes over eight seasons and concluded on September 28, 2026.

== Premise ==
When a rising high school American football player from South Los Angeles is recruited to play for Beverly Hills High, the wins, losses and struggles of two families from vastly different worlds – Crenshaw and Beverly Hills – begin to collide.

== Cast and characters ==
=== Main ===
Actor	Character	Seasons							
Actor	Character	1	2	3	4	5	6	7	8
Daniel Ezra	Spencer James	Main	Main	Main	Main	Main	Main	Guest	Guest
Bre-Z	Tamia "Coop" Cooper	Main	Main	Main	Main	Main	Main	Main	Main
Greta Onieogou	Layla Keating	Main	Main	Main	Main	Main	Main	Main	Main
Samantha Logan	Olivia Baker	Main	Main	Main	Main	Main	Main	Guest	Guest
Michael Evans Behling	Jordan Baker	Main	Main	Main	Main	Main	Main	Main	Main
Cody Christian	Asher Adams	Main	Main	Main	Main	Main	Main		
Karimah Westbrook	Grace James	Main	Main	Main	Main	Main	Main		Guest
Monet Mazur	Laura Fine-Baker	Main	Main	Main	Main	Main	Main	Guest	Guest
Taye Diggs	Billy Baker	Main (Note: Credited as main cast through the eleventh episode of season 5.)	Main	Main	Main	Main	Guest		Guest
Jalyn Hall	Dillon James	Main (Note: Credited as main cast starting with the second episode of season 1.)	Main	Main	Main	Main	Main		
Chelsea Tavares	Patience Robinson	Recurring	Recurring	Main	Main	Main	Main	Guest	Guest
Hunter Clowdus	JJ Parker	Recurring	Recurring	Recurring	Main	Main			
Osy Ikhile	Cassius Jeremy							Main	Main
Ella Simone Tabu	Amina Simms			Guest	Recurring	Guest			
Alexis Chikaeze	Amina Simms						Guest	Main	Main
Nathaniel Logan McIntyre	Kingston "KJ" Jeremy							Main	Main
Antonio J. Bell	Khalil Edwards						Guest	Main	Main

- Daniel Ezra as Spencer James (seasons 1–6; special guest seasons 7–8), based on Spencer Paysinger, a star wide receiver. He also plays safety, kickoff returner and running back. He was the all-star football player of both South Crenshaw High School and Beverly Hills High School and then of Golden Angeles University. Since childhood, Spencer shoulders the responsibility of helping his community back in South Crenshaw, being a good leader for his football team, and taking care of his family and friends. This burden increasingly overwhelmed him and led to development of his savior complex. He always had a close bond with his mother Grace and little brother Dillon. In season 2, he patched up the strained relationship he had with his estranged father Corey right before the latter's sudden death. After he was shot in the shoulder by one of Tyrone's affiliates, he got surgery to remove the bullet so he could return to playing football, but the recovery was difficult. At his senior year State Championship game, he was named an All-American. In college, as his struggles to rise up the wide receiver's depth chart continued to lead to nowhere, he offered to switch to kicker and gunner. However, by freshman year midseason, he managed to play both as gunner and wide receiver. In season 6, he saw his dream of becoming an NFL pro player come true when he was drafted by the New York Bobcats while also graduating from college as a psychology major. Relationship-wise, he started dating Layla right after moving to Beverly Hills High, but they broke up at the beginning of season 3 because he realized that he was in love with Olivia. After confessing his feelings to Olivia, who reciprocated, the two entered a long-term relationship, which after overcoming some setbacks eventually grew to the point of culminating in their marriage at the end of season 6. The newlyweds then moved to New York together due to his commitment to the Bobcats. In season 7, Olivia found out she was pregnant with their first child, eventually turned out to be twins, who were born in the series finale, when the new parents also moved back to Los Angeles after he managed to be traded to the Los Angeles Robins, ultimately retiring from football after a few years of successful career in the NFL.
- Bre-Z as Tamia "Coop" Cooper, Spencer's best friend and Patience's long-time girlfriend. She attended South Crenshaw High School. While she tried to warn Shawn off the gang, she started to take the gang life more seriously after Shawn was killed off, restarting the chain of revenge killings between rival gangs that started with Shawn's brother, Brandon, the year before. Also, as she was a minor at the time, she could not take over the lease on Shawn's rental house, even if she was to be emancipated from her mother. When she moved back in after she helped with the arrest of Tyrone Moore, she reverted to being a songwriter and DJ. At the end of season 3, she was shot by Monique Moore after she found out the latter plan to avenge her brother's death. She managed to survive, but along with that came side effects regarding her mental health: this, along with being caught up in legal investigations regarding the shooting, distracted her from making music, which she ultimately quit for good. Due to the legal stuff she got involved with, however, she found herself passionate in law, which she eventually started to study after setting as her new goal to become a lawyer. At the end of season 6, she was accepted at law school, which she started attending at the beginning of season 7, all while mutually deciding with Patience to end their relationship for good after realizing that they had outgrown each other. Afterwards, she started a relationship with her law professor Breonna Strong and eventually managed to become an attorney in the series finale.
- Greta Onieogou as Layla Keating, a Beverly Hills High student and the daughter of JP, a very successful record producer, and Monica, a famous singer who died in a car accident when she was still a child. She is also best friends with Olivia since forever and, although their friendship faced several obstacles for various reasons, the two always managed to overcome their issues and patch things up. At the beginning of the series, she was Asher's girlfriend but she broke up with him in early season 1 and then started dating Spencer. In season 2, she decided to follow in her father's footsteps by starting her own record label, which she named ForMonica Records in honor of her late mother, and became Coop's producer. In the meantime, she also found out that she suffered from depression, likely inherited from Monica, who had the same condition before dying, leading her to put her relationship with Spencer on hold due to the need to focus on her recovery, but in season 3 she broke up with him for good after he confessed her he had realized that he was in love with Olivia. In season 4, she became Patience's producer after Coop decided to quit making music while the record label became increasingly successful, which led to her deciding not to go to college in order to focus on her career as a producer. In the meantime, she and Jordan grew closer and eventually developed feelings for each other, prompting them in season 5 to start a relationship which quickly became increasingly stronger to the point of culminating in their engagement at the end of the season. Still together and engaged, in season 6 the two focused on planning for their wedding as well as dealing with her resurfaced mental health problems and eventually got married once she was finally in a good place. In the meantime, she also ventured into hospitality, founding her own club and bar named Layla's. In the final season, she decided to sell her label while retaining its name in order to have the freedom to focus solely on her producing career as well as the family and home life she had come to value most and, in the series finale, she and Jordan had a daughter whom they named Monica in honor of her late mother.
- Samantha Logan as Olivia Baker (seasons 1–6; special guest seasons 7–8), Billy and Laura's daughter, Willy's granddaughter, and Jordan's twin sister. She is a recovering drug addict who got clean after a period she spent in rehab before the events of the series, despite facing a few relapses over the course of the seasons. She is best friends with Layla and, although their friendship faced several obstacles for various reasons, the two always managed to overcome their issues and patch things up. Olivia was also the first person Spencer met when he moved to Beverly Hills High and the two immediately formed a strong friendship which eventually evolved into a romantic relationship after they realized they were in love with each other in season 3. Before getting together with Spencer, she also dated Asher for a while. In season 2, she started a podcast called Liv the Truth with the goal of helping give the Black Community a voice about the discriminations they faced, also becoming President of the Black Student Caucus and starting Beverly Hills High's own Black Lives Matter movement for this purpose. In season 4, she decided to pursue a career in journalism by attending Golden Angeles University, the same college as Spencer and Jordan, and, by the end of season 6, she managed to become a successful author, albeit a novelist and not a journalist. Also, after facing some setbacks in their relationship, in season 6 she and Spencer managed to settle into an adult, stable and mature one, which culminated in their marriage at the end of the season. The newlyweds then moved to New York together due to Spencer having been drafted by the New York Bobcats. At the beginning of season 7, she discovered she was pregnant with her and Spencer's first child, eventually turned out to be twins, who were born in the series finale, when the new parents also moved back to Los Angeles after Spencer managed to be traded to the Los Angeles Robins.
- Michael Evans Behling as Jordan Baker, Billy and Laura's son, Olivia's twin brother, and Willy's grandson. A talented football player like his father, his role is quarterback. Jordan was initially jealous of Spencer's skills when the latter first arrived at Beverly Hills High, but the two quickly formed a strong friendship which eventually culminated in them considering each other brothers. In season 2, he became very rebellious due to his parents' separation, with his behavior often becoming out of control: he got into fights, crashed his sister's car and lost his trust in his mother when she punished him for his inconsiderate actions. He was also tricked into thinking he got Simone pregnant, but she eventually gave up her child for adoption after telling Jordan he was not the father while the two developed feelings for each other and started a relationship. Soon after getting together, he and Simone impulsively decided to get married in Vegas. However, they both eventually realized their marriage was actually a mistake and got an annulment, deciding to just stay a couple. In season 4, he got a scholarship offer from Golden Angeles University, which he started attending after graduating from high school while settling on long-distance with Simone, who instead decided to move to Atlanta for college. In the meantime, however, he started to grow closer to Layla which ultimately led to him catching feelings for her, while his relationship with Simone began to fall apart due to the distance: eventually, the two broke up, acknowledging both their having grown apart after her relocating and his having fallen for Layla. After confessing his feelings to Layla, who reciprocated, in season 5 they started a relationship which quickly grew increasingly stronger to the point of culminating in their engagement at the end of the season. Still together and engaged, in season 6 the two focused on planning for their wedding as well as dealing with Layla's resurfaced mental health problems and eventually got married once she was finally in a good place. At the end of the season, he accepted a coaching job at South Crenshaw High after retiring from football due to having experienced a concussion. Afterwards, he went on to follow in his father's footsteps by continuing the Bakers legacy at South Crenshaw, where he eventually managed to become head coach in the series finale, when he and Layla also had a daughter whom they named Monica in honor of her late mother.
- Cody Christian as Asher Adams (seasons 1–6), Jordan's best friend and one of Beverly Hills High football team top players. His father lost all of their family's money, which resulted in Asher's mother leaving. Asher and his father rented a guest house from another family who was always out of the country. Asher pretended the mansion was his to keep up the appearance his family had money, until he had to confess that his father was laid off and had become broke. Asher then found out why his parents split up: his father told her mother to stay away from him as she was an ex-hooker and that is how they met. He was suspended for two games due to intoxication at Homecoming Dance after Layla, his at the time girlfriend, broke up with him, and then was kicked off the team after he tipped off Malibu with Beverly's entire offensive playbook, but eventually was allowed back. After winning the State Championship, he became more dedicated because his scout stock actually fell due to lack of targets. In the meantime, he developed feelings for Olivia, whom he started dating midway through season 2, but the two eventually broke up in season 3. In season 2 he also became offensive captain of the team along with Spencer. To improve his performance, however, he ended up starting to take steroids, which caused him to get under suspension from playing, but after having got clean and made up for his mistakes, he was allowed to play again. He managed to get an athletic full scholarship to Coastal California College, but then he was devastated to learn that because of the steroids he had taken he developed cardiomyopathy, a rare heart condition, and thus could no longer play football. As he helped Jordan and JJ out during a combine, however, he realized that he could still pursue his passion for football through coaching. After graduation, he started attending Coastal California, where he managed to become assistant coach of its football team. In the meantime, he began a committed relationship with a girl named Jaymee which even led to a son during the time jump in between season 5 and 6, with the two deciding to settle down together by going to live as a family in the Bakers' house in South Crenshaw some months after the baby's birth. Also, after being fired from his coaching job at Coastal California, he asked his former high school football coach Montes to hire him as her assistant, which she accepted. At the beginning of season 7, it was revealed that he left L.A. after becoming assistant head coach in New York.
- Karimah Westbrook as Grace James (seasons 1–6; special guest season 8), Spencer and Dillon's mother. She was also Billy's high school sweetheart and had a one-night stand with him many years after they broke up, when she was already married to Corey, Spencer and Dillon's father, and he was already married to Laura. In season 3, she started dating D'Angelo Carter, the new principal of South Crenshaw High with whom she initially did not get along very well before getting to know him better. In season 4, D'Angelo proposed to her after getting permission from Spencer and Dillon and she happily accepted. The two eventually got married at the beginning of season 5.
- Monet Mazur as Laura Fine-Baker (seasons 1–6; special guest seasons 7–8), Billy's wife and Olivia and Jordan's mother. She is a lawyer all for strictness and discipline. In season 2, after discovering about Billy and Grace's affair, she tried to keep the family together and spent much of the season laying down ground rules and punishing Jordan, who started getting into trouble by fighting and crashing his sister's car. She also decided to run for and was subsequently elected District Attorney of Los Angeles County all while eventually filing for separation, even though in season 3 she and Billy started reconnecting and ultimately reconciled and reunited, even renewing their vows at the end of the season. In season 4, she quit the DA job after realizing the systematic failure of the system and managed to fight Preach's murder charges, reaching a deal for Coop to serve community service for her part of obstruction of justice in covering Preach's involvement in Monique's death. In season 5, she started a job as guest lecturer at Golden Angeles University.
- Taye Diggs as Billy Baker (seasons 1–5; special guest seasons 6, 8), the head coach of Beverly Hills High football team who recruits Spencer, Laura's husband and Olivia and Jordan's father. Like Spencer, he was an alumnus of South Crenshaw High and one of its football team top players who in fact managed to make it into the NFL as a former second-round pick, before his career was cut short by knee injuries. His father abandoned him as a child. It was also revealed that both he and Corey played against each other in Pop Warner and he actually left South Crenshaw because he could not deal with the loss of his mother, who was the history teacher of South Crenshaw High. In season 2, he tried to fight to repair the marriage with Laura after she discovered his affair with Grace, but she ultimately decided to file for separation. At the end of the season, he resigned from Beverly Hills High and became the head coach of South Crenshaw High football team. In season 3, he and Laura started growing closer again and eventually reunited, even renewing their vows at the end of the season. In season 4, he became the interim principal of South Crenshaw High before getting promoted to full-time principal. In season 5, he was offered a job at Golden Angeles University, which he initially accepted, but then turned down after Spencer convinced him not to leave South Crenshaw High. However, shortly after he died to save one of his players' life when the team's bus crashed, leaving his family and both Beverly and South Crenshaw communities in despair.
- Jalyn Hall as Dillon James (seasons 1–6), Spencer's younger brother. Like Spencer, he is also a grade-A student and is very mature for his young age. He likes sci-fi comics and wanted to play football like his brother Spencer, but due to being too young, he stuck to playing basketball. He was later found to be Corey's son after a private dispute about his paternity because of Grace's affair with Billy. In season 4, he stopped playing basketball, but developed his skills as an illustrator as a way of acting out against his least favorite history teacher. In order to stop him from spiraling out, since he felt trapped in Crenshaw due to his lack of athletic talent, Spencer asked him to be his graphic designer for his social media brand. In season 6, he was accepted at a prestigious School of Arts in Boston, where he moved to start attending.
- Chelsea Tavares as Patience Robinson (seasons 3–6; recurring seasons 1–2; special guest seasons 7–8), Coop's long-time girlfriend. An aspiring lyricist, but due to having a supportive family when she came out as a lesbian, she often struggled to understand Coop's hesitance to let her meet Coop's mother and her more supportive church friends. Her music career began taking off in season 4, but Coops' criminal charges have been holding her back. She and Coop broke up in season 4, but kept being housemates along with Layla and Olivia. In the season 5 finale, she was stabbed by a crazy stalker fan named Miko, which left her traumatized. She eventually managed to overcome her trauma with Coop's help in season 6 and the two also rekindled their relationship. Then, she was offered to become a Broadway performer, which she accepted, leading her to move to New York. However, being apart from Coop made both of them realize that they had outgrown each other, so in season 7 they mutually decided to end their relationship for good.
- Hunter Clowdus as JJ Parker (seasons 4–5; recurring seasons 1–3), an outside linebacker/QB2/tight end football player of Beverly Hills High, but also a party boy and a very competent pool player. In season 3, he showed interest in returning to his junior high position of QB after new Coach Montes saw his arm strength, accuracy and pocket movement to be better than Jordan, but still lost the QB competition. He was excited to tell his friends that he got a scholarship offer from Coastal California College, but this made things awkward for a while as Asher realized that it was his original scholarship before his retirement. In college, he reverted to a linebacker, and became a Zen master and a yogi instead of solely focusing on football. His carefree and happy-go-lucky attitude came from the fact that he and his uncle almost died in a car accident during a vacation in Hawaii because his uncle had been drinking. He used his cut of the NIL money to extend the lease on the beach house where he, Spencer, Jordan, and Asher all started living in during the summer before entering college. At the beginning of season 6, it was revealed that he relocated to Tibet to "find himself."
- Osy Ikhile as Cassius Jeremy (seasons 7–8), the new football coach of Beverly Hills High who was later reveled to be the son of Billy's long-lost half brother and thus Jordan and Olivia's cousin.
- Alexis Chikaeze (seasons 7–8; guest season 6) and Ella Simone Tabu (recurring season 4; guest seasons 3, 5) as Amina Simms, Preach and Monique's daughter and a South Crenshaw High student who got caught between KJ and Khalil.
- Nathaniel Logan McIntyre as Kingston "KJ" Jeremy (seasons 7–8), Cassius' son and Beverly High's newly transferred quarterback who always had the dream and goal to play for the NFL.
- Antonio J. Bell as Khalil Edwards (seasons 7–8; guest season 6), a South Crenshaw High family-troubled student who later became quarterback of its football team.

=== Recurring ===
- Jay Reeves as Shawn Scott (season 1; guest season 6) a drug dealer and gang member who sometimes did good deeds, but was shot dead by rival gangs as part of revenge killing in front of his house after he paid Tyrone off to get out of the gang.
- Spence Moore II as Chris Jackson (seasons 1–4; guest season 6), the quarterback of South Crenshaw High's football team. Despite initially resenting Spencer for moving to Beverly, he helped Beverly Eagles defeat Malibu using Crenshaw's old playbook.
- Michelle Hayden as Ripley (season 1), a cheerleader for Malibu Charter School and love interest of Jordan, but she got him into trouble as she was a marijuana user.
- Demetrius Shipp Jr. as Tyrone Moore (seasons 1–2), a gang leader in Crenshaw. He was the mastermind that killed both Brandon and Shawn Scott. He also put Preach into the hospital by shooting. He was apprehended by police on State Championship night after Coop set up a police ambush. However, he was released from jail after Preach decided not to testify. He was later killed on his front porch by Ruth Scott in revenge for killing her sons.
- Brent Jennings as Willy Baker (season 1; guest seasons 3–7), Billy's father and Olivia and Jordan's grandfather. Former Beverly Hills Football coach that raised Billy to become an NFL player, he believed Billy abandoned him after going pro and leaving Crenshaw. He disapproved of his son's lifestyle and used to refuse to accept his daughter-in-law because she is white. Despite this, he received monthly payments from his son. He also conned money from his grandson by suggesting he could not afford medical care for his diabetes. In season 4, he suffered from a heart attack on prom night, which causes Billy and Laura to move into his house him to keep an eye on him. Becoming tired of their presence, he decided to move to Florida and stayed with his friend Jerome.
- Casper Van Dien as Harold Adams (seasons 1–2; guest seasons 3, 5), Asher's father whom he tried to help after he recovered from his own alcoholism.
- Mitchell Edwards as Cameron "Cam" Watkins (seasons 1–3; guest seasons 4–5), South Crenshaw's new receiver after Spencer left. Despite having great size, speed, and athleticism, he was often outplayed by Spencer as the cornerback due to his poor hands and easy tells. In season 3, he transferred to Westlake not wanting to play as a backup to Spencer.
- Chad L. Coleman as Corey James (seasons 1–2), a former American football player-turned-coach and Spencer and Dillon's biological father, but he left his family after discovering Billy and Grace's affair. His football dreams were dashed after high school because he was stricken with life-threatening illness, which he later died of.
- Kareem J. Grimes as Cordell "Preach" Simms (seasons 2–8; guest season 1), a gang member who initially followed Tyrone because he thought Tyrone saved Brandon's lives by serving two prison terms together. However, when Coop made him realize the Scotts were both killed by Tyrone, he tried to set a plan to kill him, but he failed, and was shot and critically injured, and was recovering in Intensive Care Unit post-operation. In season 2, he got a job as a security guard after he recovered and helped Coop gain an audience for her first show, but was arrested after Tyrone set him up and was sent back to prison for assaulting Buggs and breaking his parole violation. He was released in the season 3 premiere after Monique got his 1st strike conviction overturned. In season 4, he started working as an English Literature tutor for the football team at South Crenshaw High when Billy was an interim principal, but was arrested at the school for Monique's murder before the charges were dropped and got probation for unlawful possession of firearms due to "justifiable homicide". Despite this, Billy gave him another chance and let him continue to teach the students after seeing how well he connected with them.
- Asjha Cooper as Kia Williams (seasons 2–3; guest seasons 1, 5–6), a South Crenshaw High student, Spencer's ex-girlfriend and an avid social activist. Her uncle, Flip Williams, is a reformed Bloods gang member.
- Lahmard J. Tate as Flip Williams (season 2; guest seasons 1, 5), Kia's uncle and a reformed Blood gang member.
- Jordan Belfi as Principal Ed London (seasons 2, 8; guest seasons 1, 4, 7), Beverly High's principal.
- Elvis Nolasco (season 2; guest season 1) and Ray Campbell (season 4; guest seasons 3, 5–6, 8) as JP Keating, Layla's father, a music mogul that grew up in Harlem, New York, and an alumnus of UCLA. He donated to build Rose Bowl's Locker Room. He was absent for most of Layla's childhood due to his job but he came back for good when he realized that Layla attempted suicide at the exact same place as her mother. He stepped back from his roles in his record label after meeting a new girlfriend.
- Da'Vinchi as Darnell Hayes (season 2; guest seasons 3–7), new quarterback at South Crenshaw and the son of a woman whom Corey had a previous relationship with. He lived with Corey for 7 years in Nevada. While initially having a frosty relationship with Spencer, they reconciled in Corey's final days. He was invited to live with Grace soon after Corey died. He suddenly had to leave, because his birth mother was hurt while on military duty. He came back for a brief moment to convince Spencer not to give up football to save his community.
- Corey Reynolds as Cliff Mosley (seasons 2, 8), the head of the Beverly High School Boosters until he was voted out as he tried to relinquish Billy Baker from his coaching role without his presence.
- Kayla Smith as Rochelle Mosley (season 2), a recent graduate of Beverly Hills High School and aspiring sports journalist.
- Geffri Maya as Simone Hicks (seasons 2–4; guest season 5), a Beverly High student who became pregnant, giving birth to a baby boy but deciding to give him up for adoption. She started a relationship with Jordan and the two even married during a trip to Las Vegas. However, the marriage was short lived as the two decided to get an annulment after realizing they were too young, but they continued dating. After graduating from Beverly High and reconciling with the foster family to retain visiting rights, she applied to go to Bringston University, a historically black college in Atlanta, at the request of her aunt, where she decided to revive her dream to become a professional tennis player, leading to the spinoff series All American: Homecoming.
- Dina Meyer as Gwen Adams (season 2; guest seasons 3–4), Asher's mother who was once an escort and met Harold as one of her clients.
- Lamon Archey as D'Angelo Carter (seasons 3–5; guest seasons 2, 6), the interim principal at South Crenshaw High, which he also attended in the past with Corey and Billy, but was sent to boarding school after his freshman year due to the bullying culture of the football team. He became Grace's husband at the beginning of season 5.
- Erica Peeples as Monique "Mo" Moore (season 3; guest season 2), an attorney and Tyrone's older sister and Amina's mother. She shot Coop, then was killed by Preach for "justifiable homicide".
- Anna Lore as Carrie (season 3; guest seasons 2, 4), Layla's friend but also a recovering alcoholic with serious attachment and abandonment issues. After Layla saved Carrie from jumping off a cliff while she was spiraling in season 3, Layla was traumatized and changed into a control freak in season 4. The two reunited in San Diego and she reassured Layla that she had moved back with her parents and finally found a stable job, which brought proper closure to what happened and their relationship.
- Alexandra Barreto as Coach Elena Montes (seasons 3–4; guest seasons 5–6), new head coach for the Beverly High Eagles. Her husband is also a coach.
- Alondra Delgado as Vanessa Montes (season 3), a new student at Beverly High School and the new head coach's daughter. She had a summer fling with Asher.
- Noah Gray-Cabey as Frausto (seasons 3–4; guest season 5), a teammate of Spencer's from Crenshaw. He was unwelcoming to both Spencer and Coach Baker.
- Simeon Daise as Jabari Long (seasons 3–6), an outside linebacker who was a teammate of Spencer's from South Crenshaw High and later became a student and football player at Coastal California.
- Deric Augustine as Clay Taylor (seasons 4–5), a musician whom Layla had a summer fling with. He is the current CEO of 'Clay Taylor Entertainment', formerly 'Keating Records', which became a parent company to 'ForMonica Records'.
- Mustafa Speaks as Coach Kenny Boone (seasons 4–6; guest season 8), wide receiver coach at Golden Angeles University who later became head coach.
- Zachary S. Williams as Isaiah Winfield (season 4; guest season 5), a wide receiver who attended Golden Angeles University with Spencer, Jordan and Olivia.
- Journey Montana as Jen (season 4), a girl with addiction issues for whom Olivia became sponsor.
- Sean Carrigan as Ivan Garrett (seasons 4–5), the former head coach at Golden Angeles University before getting exposed by Olivia for illicit behaviours. He considered Isaiah to be his preferred wideout candidate for scholarship. As a head coach with a defensive background, he was also a very traditional fundamental coach with 46 as the base defense.
- Miya Horcher as Jaymee Aquino (seasons 4–6), Asher's new girlfriend and baby mama. She was a waitress at Asher's stepfather's fine-dining restaurant, but had to take leave in the summer as she suffers from lupus. In season 5, after 3 months in remission, her symptoms returned on Billy Baker's birthday and she required hospitalization, which was the first time Asher saw her symptoms develop and worsen.
- Christian James as Wade Waters (seasons 4, 6), former QB1 for the Golden Angeles University Condors, who after gaining NIL deals skipped practice, then lost his starting spot to Jordan. After being kicked out of the team, he was recruited by Coastal California in season 6.
- Brittany Marie Batchelder as Davita Jones (season 4; guest seasons 5–6), a branding and marketing student and also a player for the women's soccer team at Golden Angeles University who helped Spencer build a social media presence and became friends with Olivia.
- Kamar de los Reyes as Coach Montes (season 4; guest seasons 5–6), head coach at Coastal California College and the husband of Elena Montes.
- Madison Shamoun as Skye (seasons 4–5), Coop's new love interest.
- Alexis Fields as Denise Patterson (season 5; guest seasons 2–4, 6), a friend of Billy and Grace who is a South Crenshaw High School alum.
- Ashley Argota Torres as Gia (season 5), Layla's assistant.
- Pauline Dyer as Alicia (season 5), Spencer's new love interest.
- Courtney Bandeko as Miko Scott (season 5), a fan of Patience with a lack of awareness of boundaries.
- David Shatraw as Professor Richard Hill (season 5), Coop's law professor.
- Jamel King as Coach Terence "Mac" McClelland (season 6), the offensive coordinator of the GAU football team.
- Brian Borello as Ryan (season 6), Layla's business partner.
- Melissa Jane Rodriguez as Charissa (season 6), a new roommate at the beach house.
- Taiv Lee as Deion (season 6; guest season 7), a student at South Crenshaw who became friends with Spencer.
- Gilbert Glenn Brown as Coach Bobby Shepard (season 7; guest seasons 6, 8), the new football head coach of South Crenshaw High.
- Elijah M. Cooper as Yasi Ray (season 7), the quarterback of South Crenshaw High.
- Lauryn Hardy as Tori (seasons 7–8), a popular Beverly Hills High cheerleader who became friends and then got involved with KJ.
- Terayle Hill as Marqui Edwards (season 7; guest season 8), Khalil's father who is a Crips gang member.
- Sasha Lance as Breonna Strong (seasons 7–8), Coop's law professor and eventual girlfriend.
- Brandon Spink as Grayson (season 7; guest season 8), KJ's teammate at Beverly High.
- Angel Parker as Ava Jeremy (seasons 7–8), Cassius' wife and KJ's mother.
- Sloane Avery as Elle Grant (season 7), a singer and songwriter whom Layla signed under her record label.
- Briana Price as Tash Williams (season 8), Khalil’s estranged mother.
- Victoria Noelle as Miranda (season 8), Khalil’s new love interest.

=== Notable guests ===
- Chip Kelly as Himself (special guest season 2)
- Merrick McCartha as Robert Hicks (recurring season 3, guest season 2), Simone's father.
- Jaclyn Smith as Wendy Fine (special guest seasons 3, 5–6), Laura's mother and Olivia and Jordan's grandmother.
- Cordae as Himself (special guest season 3)
- DeSean Jackson as Himself (special guest season 3)
- Joanna "JoJo" Levesque as Sabine (special guest season 4), Layla's mentor in musicianship and production.
- Morris Chestnut as Rick Barnes (special guest season 5), the GAU's athletic director.
- Tribe Mafia as Themselves (background music season 5)
- John Salley as Himself (special guest season 5)
- Darone Okolie as Sal Dominguez (recurring season 5)
- Tre Hale as Kai Davis (recurring seasons 5–6)
- Trick Williams as Eddie Blair (special guest season 7) (Note: Williams also worked as an extra in season 3.)

=== Crossover cast ===
Cast members of the spin-off All American: Homecoming:

- Peyton Alex Smith as Damon Sims (guest season 3)
- Kelly Jenrette as Amara Patterson (guest seasons 3–4), the current president of Bringston University.
- Cory Hardrict as Coach Marcus Turner (guest season 3), the baseball head coach of Bringston University.
- Sylvester Powell as Jessie "J.R." Raymond (guest season 3)
- Netta Walker as Keisha McCalla (guest seasons 3, 5)
- Camille Hyde as Thea Mays (guest season 3)
- Rhoyle Ivy King as Nathaniel "Nate" Hardin (guest season 3)
- Leonard Roberts as Zeke Allen (guest season 3), the former president of Bringston University.
- John Marshall Jones as Leonard Shaw (guest season 3), the former baseball head coach of Bringston University.
- Derek Rivera as Santiago Reyes (guest season 3)

== Episodes ==
Season	Episodes	Originally released	
Season	Episodes	First released	Last released
1	16	October 10, 2018	March 20, 2019
2	16	October 7, 2019	March 9, 2020
3	19	January 18, 2021	July 19, 2021
4	20	October 25, 2021	May 23, 2022
5	20	October 10, 2022	May 15, 2023
6	15	April 1, 2024	July 15, 2024
7	13	January 29, 2025	May 5, 2025
8	13	July 13, 2026	September 28, 2026

== Production ==
=== Development ===
In September 2017, it was announced that the CW veteran Greg Berlanti had two pilots in development for the network, one of which inspired by the life of NFL football player Spencer Paysinger. It was also revealed that April Blair would write and executive produce the untitled project, with Berlanti and Sarah Schechter executive producing as well. A pilot for the potential series, then called Spencer, was ordered in January 2018 and subsequently picked up to series on May 11, 2018. On October 2, 2018, it was reported that Blair had stepped down as showrunner due to "personal reasons" and was subsequently replaced by co-executive producer Nkechi Okoro Carroll, who was also made an executive producer. On October 8, 2018, The CW ordered five additional scripts for the series. On November 8, 2018, The CW ordered an additional three episodes for the series, bringing the first season total up to 16 episodes.

On April 24, 2019, The CW renewed the series for a second season. On October 8, 2019, The CW ordered three additional episodes for the season, which was originally set to consist of 13 episodes, bringing the total up to 16 episodes and matching the first season's size.

On January 7, 2020, The CW renewed the series for a third season.

On February 3, 2021, The CW renewed the series for a fourth season.

On March 22, 2022, The CW renewed the series for a fifth season.

On January 11, 2023, The CW renewed the series for a sixth season consisting of 13 episodes. The renewal was a part of the deal in which The CW was sold to Nexstar, with the size of the season being expanded from 13 to 15 episodes on April 22, 2024.

On June 3, 2024, The CW renewed the series for a 13-episode seventh season, but reduced its budget in the process, with some of the regular cast members exiting.

In April 2025, The CW President Brad Schwartz stated that the network was holding discussions with Warner Bros. Television to renew the series for one final season, in order to let it complete its story. On June 2, 2025, The CW renewed the series for a 13-episode eighth and final season.

=== Casting ===
On February 22, 2018, Taye Diggs was cast as Billy Baker, followed a week later by Samantha Logan cast as Olivia Baker, his daughter. The rest of the cast was filled out through mid-March, with Bre-Z and Greta Onieogou cast on March 15, 2018 as characters Tamia Cooper and Layla Keating, respectively, and Monet Mazur, Michael Evans Behling and Cody Christian cast the next day to play Laura Fine-Baker, Olivia's mother, Jordan Baker, Olivia's brother, and Asher, respectively. Karimah Westbrook was cast as Grace James on March 19, 2018 and British actor Daniel Ezra was cast in the lead role of Spencer James on March 21, 2018. On May 31, 2018, Jalyn Hall was promoted to series regular as Dillon, Spencer's little brother.

On October 1, 2020, Chelsea Tavares was promoted to series regular for the third season.

On October 4, 2021, Hunter Clowdus was promoted to series regular for the fourth season.

On March 29, 2024, it was announced that Clowdus exited the series before the sixth season due his character's storyline having "organically wrapped" at the end of the fifth season.

On June 24, 2024, it was announced that Daniel Ezra would not return as a series regular for the seventh season, after having made the decision alongside showrunner Nkechi Okoro Carroll before production for the sixth season began. On September 24, 2024, it was announced that Samantha Logan, Cody Christian, Karimah Westbrook, Monet Mazur and Chelsea Tavares would not return as series regulars for the seventh season as well, but it was confirmed that Ezra would make guest appearances, as would others of the former main cast members, and also direct. It was also reported that Osy Ikhile and Nathaniel Logan McIntyre joined the main cast respectively as Cassius Jeremy, Beverly High's new football coach, and Kingston Jeremy, Cassius' son, while Antonio J. Bell and Alexis Chikaeze were promoted to series regulars for the seventh season. On October 10, 2024, it was reported that Logan would guest star on the second episode of the seventh season. On January 29, 2025, ahead of the seventh season premiere, Nkechi Okoro Carroll stated that almost every former main cast member "comes back in some capacity multiple times [during the] season" and confirmed that Tavares and Mazur were both set to make guest appearances.

=== Filming ===
Filming for the series takes place in Los Angeles, California. Filming for the first season began in July 2018. Filming took place in Thomas Jefferson High School in South Central Los Angeles known as South Crenshaw High School in the series.

== Release ==
=== Broadcast ===
All American premiered on The CW on October 10, 2018, with its first season finale airing on March 20, 2019. The second season premiered on October 7, 2019 and concluded on March 9, 2020. The third season premiered on January 18, 2021 and concluded on July 19, 2021. The fourth season premiered on October 25, 2021 and concluded on May 23, 2022. The fifth season premiered on October 10, 2022 and concluded on May 15, 2023. The sixth season premiered on April 1, 2024 and concluded on July 15, 2024. The seventh season premiered on January 29, 2025 and concluded on May 5, 2025. The eighth and final season premiered on July 13, 2026, with the series finale airing on September 28, 2026.

In the United Kingdom, the series aired on ITV2, which acquired its broadcast rights.

In New Zealand, the series aired as a web-only series on TVNZ OnDemand up until the fifth season, with each episode of the first three seasons being released the day following the US airing.

=== Streaming ===
Each episode was made available for streaming on The CW's app and website a day after its linear airing. In addition, each season was released on the US version of Netflix after it finished airing on The CW.

On June 1, 2025, the first six seasons were released in bulk on ThreeNow.

== Reception ==
=== Ratings ===
Despite receiving positive reviews from both critics and audiences, All American initially suffered poor television ratings on The CW, which however improved after the series became a sleeper hit when it was released on Netflix thanks to a deal between the streaming service and Warner Bros., generating revenue for the studio which was a key driver for the series' renewal.

Viewership and ratings per season of All American
Season	Timeslot (ET)	Episodes	First aired		Last aired		TV season	Viewership rank	Avg. viewers (millions)
Season	Timeslot (ET)	Episodes	Date	Viewers (millions)	Date	Viewers (millions)	TV season	Viewership rank	Avg. viewers (millions)
1	Wednesday 9:00 p.m.	16	October 10, 2018	0.69	March 20, 2019	0.54	2018–19	203	0.90
2	Monday 8:00 p.m.	16	October 7, 2019	0.88	March 9, 2020	0.70	2019–20	127	1.18
3	Monday 8:00 p.m.	19	January 18, 2021	1.05	July 19, 2021	0.72	2020–21	135	1.40
4	Monday 8:00 p.m.	20	October 25, 2021	0.64	May 23, 2022	0.67	2021–22	120	1.06
5	Monday 8:00 p.m.	20	October 10, 2022	0.45	May 15, 2023	0.39	2022–23	113	0.87
6	Monday 8:00 p.m.	15	April 1, 2024	0.37	July 15, 2024	0.42	2023–24	125	0.77
7	Wednesday 8:00 p.m. (1); Monday 8:00 p.m. (2–13)	13	January 29, 2025	0.28	May 5, 2025	0.30	2024–25	N/A	N/A
8	Monday 8:00 p.m. (1, 3–13); Monday 9:00 p.m. (2)	13	July 13, 2026	0.41	September 28, 2026	N/A	2025–26	N/A	N/A

=== Critical response ===
On review aggregator website Rotten Tomatoes, the first season holds an approval rating of 92%, based on 25 reviews, and an average rating of 6.90/10. The website's critical consensus reads, "All American's ambitious attempts to tackle class struggles and classroom drama largely play thanks to its winning cast—an auspicious start to a promising new series". Metacritic, which uses a weighted average, assigned a score of 63 out of 100 based on 15 critics, indicating "generally favorable reviews".

The second season has a 100% approval rating on Rotten Tomatoes, based on 6 reviews, with an average rating of 8.80/10.

=== Accolades ===
Year	Award	Category	Nominee	Result	Ref.
2019	Black Reel Award	Outstanding Drama Series	All American	Nominated	
2019	Black Reel Award	Outstanding Supporting Actress, Drama Series	Karimah Westbrook	Nominated	
2020	NAACP Image Award	Outstanding Writing in a Drama Series	Nkechi Okoro Carroll (for "Hussle & Motivate")	Nominated	
2020	Black Reel Award	Outstanding Guest Actor, Drama Series	Chad Coleman	Won	
2022	NAACP Image Award	Outstanding Drama Series	All American	Nominated	
2022	NAACP Image Award	Outstanding Supporting Actor in a Drama Series	Daniel Ezra	Nominated	
2022	NAACP Image Award	Outstanding Writing in a Dramatic Series	Nkechi Okoro Carroll (for "Homecoming")	Nominated	

== Spin-off ==
On December 18, 2020, it was announced that a backdoor pilot for an All American spin-off centered on the character Simone Hicks was in early development at The CW, with Geffri Maya, who portrayed Simone, reprising her role. On February 1, 2021, The CW gave the spin-off a pilot order and titled it as All American: Homecoming. On March 29, 2021, Peyton Alex Smith, Cory Hardrict, Kelly Jenrette, Sylvester Powell, Netta Walker, and Camille Hyde were cast to star in the series. On May 24, 2021, All American: Homecoming was picked up to series with Nkechi Okoro Carroll serving both as creator and executive producer, the latter alongside Greg Berlanti, Sarah Schechter, David Madden, and Robbie Rogers. The backdoor pilot, written by Carroll and directed by Michael Schultz, aired on July 5, 2021 as part of the third season of All American. On December 16, 2021, it was announced that Mitchell Edwards, who portrayed recurring character Cam Watkins on All American, was set to reprise his role in the spin-off as a series regular, while Rhoyle Ivy King was cast in a recurring capacity. The series premiered on The CW on February 21, 2022 and ran for 41 episodes over three seasons, with its final episode airing on September 30, 2024.
