= Daniel Ezra =

English actor (born 1991)

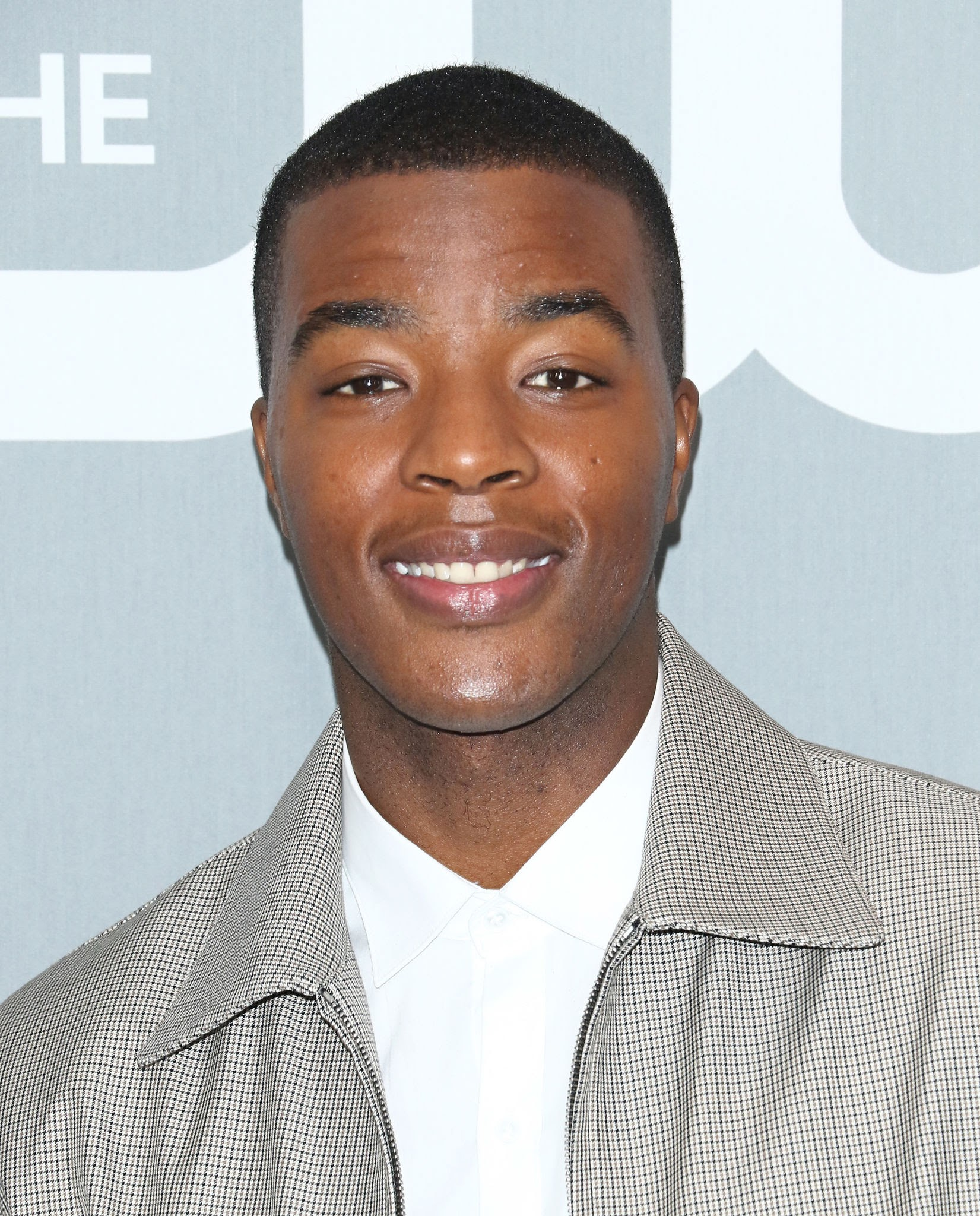
- Ezra in 2018
- Born: 15 December 1991 (age 34); Birmingham, West Midlands, England
- Education: East 15 Acting School
- Occupation: Actor
- Years active: 2014–present

Daniel Ezra (born 15 December 1991) is an English actor. On television, he is known for his roles in the Sky One series A Discovery of Witches (2018–2022) and the CW series All American (2018–2026). His films include The Running Man (2025).

== Early life ==
Ezra was born on 15 December 1991 in Birmingham. Both his paternal and maternal grandparents were from Jamaica. Growing up, he was a fan of Harry Potter, Philip Pullman books, and The Lord of the Rings. He grew up playing basketball, but stopped sports when he began acting. Ezra attended Great Barr School, now known as Fortis Academy in Great Barr, Birmingham. He went on to train at East 15 Acting School.

== Career ==
Ezra was not interested in acting until he turned 16 when a teacher at school convinced him to take a role in a school production. On stage, Ezra appeared as Sebastian in Twelfth Night and was nominated for an Ian Charleson Award. After making his screen debut in the 2014 television film Murdered by My Boyfriend, Ezra began appearing in BBC dramas, including Undercover and The Missing. In 2018, Ezra had a recurring role in the British fantasy drama A Discovery of Witches.

In March 2018, Ezra was cast in a leading role in the American sports drama series All American, which marked his U.S. acting debut and required him to use an American accent. Once he learned that he had received the role, he spent as much time as he could in South Central Los Angeles and carried a football with him everywhere so that he could practice his accent and learn about the local culture. His favorite rapper, Nipsey Hussle, was from Crenshaw, where the show takes place, so Ezra also studied every song and interview of Hussle as a way of practicing his American accent. He did not have an accent coach. In addition, Spencer Paysinger, the real-life football player on whom Ezra's character is based, drove Ezra and his costar Taye Diggs around his local neighborhood so that they could understand the neighborhood dynamics. To prepare for the show, Ezra also watched the NFL Network constantly to learn about the rules of American football. Ezra first realised the show was successful when he attempted to walk in Times Square and was recognised by fans who approached him.

In October 2024, it was announced that Ezra would be joining Glen Powell in the Edgar Wright And Paramount feature The Running Man.

Ezra will appear in the upcoming Netflix limited series adaptation All the Sinners Bleed, based on the S. A. Cosby novel of the same name.

== Filmography ==
=== Film ===
Year	Title	Role	Notes
2014	Hours	Tim	
2014	Blood Cells	Thom	
2017	National Theatre Live: Twelfth Night	Sebastian	
2025	The Running Man	Bradley Throckmorton	

=== Television ===
Year	Title	Role	Notes
2014	Murdered by My Boyfriend	Joseph	Television film
2014	The Village	Ghana Jones	Episode: "2.1"
2015	Vera	Cameron Thorne	Episode: "Shadows in the Sky"
2015	No Offence	Ajamu	Episode: "1.6"
2016	Prey	Alan Gill	2 episodes
2016	Undercover	Dan Johnson	6 episodes
2016	The Missing	Daniel Reed	5 episodes
2017	Prime Suspect 1973	DC Ashton	6 episodes
2018–2022	A Discovery of Witches	Nathaniel Wilson	10 episodes
2018–2026	All American	Spencer James	Main cast (seasons 1–6, guest role in season 7 & 8)
2022	All American: Homecoming	Spencer James	Episode: "We Need a Resolution"
2022	The Smeds and the Smoos	Bill	Television film; voice role
TBA	All the Sinners Bleed †	Marquis Crown	Limited series

=== Theatre ===
Year	Title	Role	Venue
2017	Twelfth Night	Performer	West End, Royal National Theatre
2026	Shifters	Dre	Off-Broadway, Cherry Lane Theatre
