= Michael Evans Behling =

American actor

- Born: March 5, 1996 (age 30); Columbus, Ohio, U.S.
- Citizenship: United States
- Education: Columbus North High School; Indiana State University
- Occupation: Actor
- Years active: 2017–present
- Known for: All American
- Height: 1.88 m (6 ft 2 in)
- Spouse: Madison Stanton (m. 2021; div. 2021)
- Parents: Mike Behling; Carol Behling

Michael Evans Behling (born March 5, 1996) is an American actor. He is best known for his role as Jordan Baker on All American.

== Early life ==
Behling was born in Columbus, Ohio and adopted by Mike and Carol Behling, but grew up in Columbus, Indiana. He is biracial and was adopted by a white family. In a March 2020 YouTube video, he stated that his father is of Nigerian descent and his mother is of German descent and that his last name is German. He has three siblings, Matt, Adam, and Andrea. Behling's family owned ten acres of land, several dogs and cats and a chicken coop. Sports were a big part of his life growing up, and Behling played baseball, soccer, and volleyball.

He first thought about being an actor when he was a freshman in high school and was inspired by Heath Ledger's performance in The Dark Knight. Behling attended Columbus North High School, where he played football for two years and ran track. He was on the honor roll and graduated in 2015. Behling continued to run track in college, competing in the 400-meter hurdles. He stopped competing in track after breaking his foot twice, which required two surgeries. He attended Indiana State University for two years as a pre-med student before dropping out to pursue modeling and acting. Prior to beginning his acting career, he worked as an assistant director at the Donner Aquatic Center in Columbus, Indiana.

== Career ==
While in college, Behling began modeling, and eventually his team convinced him to audition for acting roles. He did several advertising campaigns with Adidas and White Castle. Behling began his career in television in 2017 with a role as "Handsome Dude" on Empire. In March 2018, he was cast as Jordan Baker on All American, and filming for the pilot began two weeks later. Behling moved to Los Angeles in January 2018 when filming began, and after his finances ran low he began sleeping on a friend's floor. He has said that he identifies with his character because they are both biracial and looking for the place where they fit in. His role as Jordan Baker is his breakout role. He is currently represented by HRI Talent and Management 101.

Behling has a clothing line, DesignedAt5AM, which he started with three friends from high school (Nicholas Stevens, Drew Thompson, and Floyd Athaide). The clothing line was inspired by his desire to start his day early to accomplish his goals and by his high school friends' early morning swim practices.

== Personal life ==
Behling lives in Los Angeles. He actively advocates for animal rights and mental health awareness. Behling married his longtime girlfriend, Madison Stanton in April 2021 but the couple divorced in September 2021 after 5 months of marriage.

== Filmography ==
Film
Year	Title	Role	Notes
2021	A Cinderella Story: Starstruck	Jackson Stone	Direct-to-video
2022	The Manny	Morgan Washington	Tubi Original
2023	The Flower That Never Wilts	Damien	Short film
2025	Vipers	Chase	Short film, also executive producer
2025	The Queen's Jewels	Orion	

Television
Year	Title	Role	Notes
2017	Empire	Handsome Dude	Episode: "The Lady Doth Protest"
2018–2026	All American	Jordan Baker	Main cast
2019	Grey's Anatomy	Brady Mays	Episode: "Good Shepherd"
2022	All American: Homecoming	Jordan Baker	Special guest, 4 episodes
2024	Read the Room	Bad Doc	Episode: "Read the Room"
