= Karimah Westbrook =

American actress (born 1978)

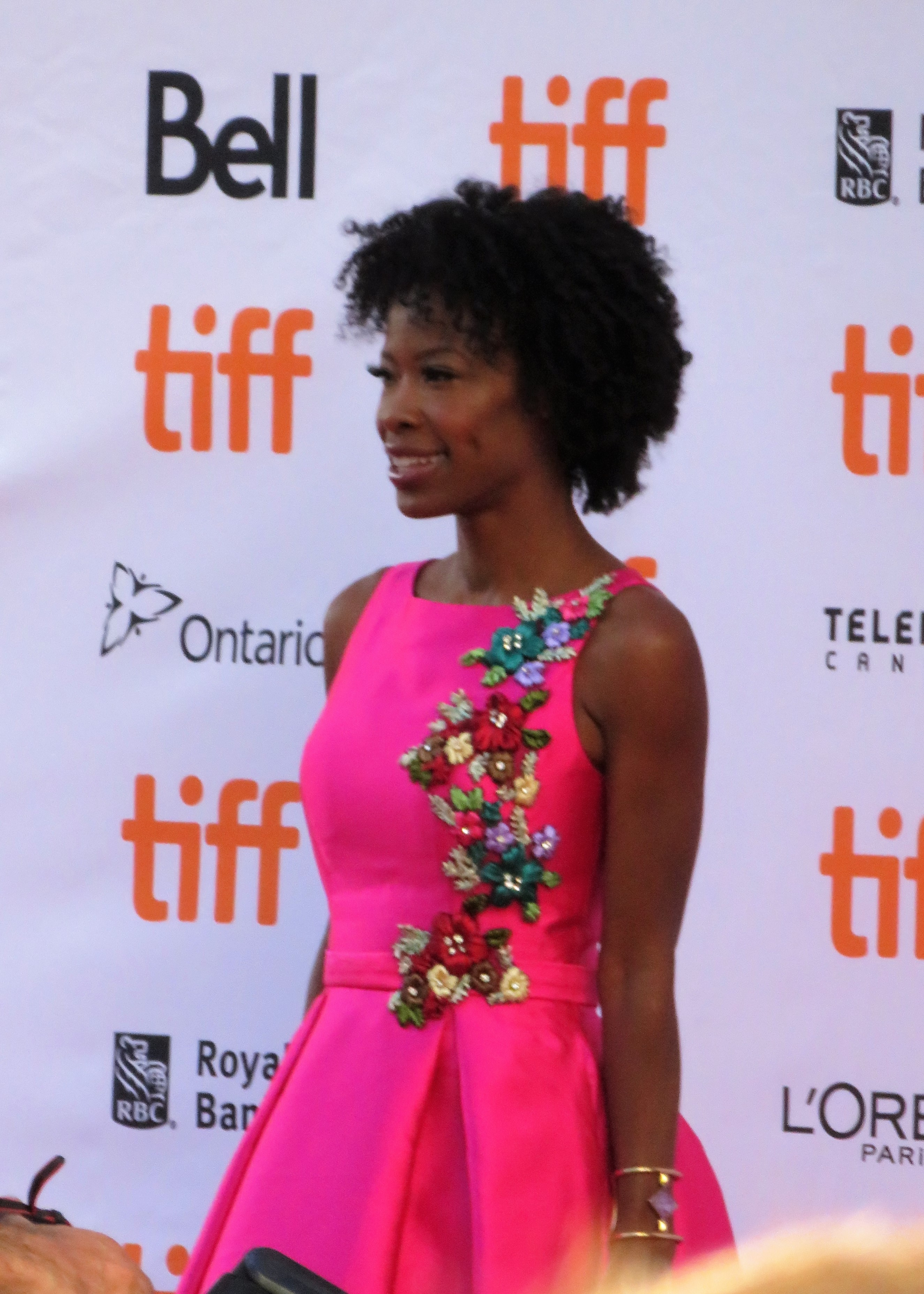
- Westbrook in 2017
- Born: October 6, 1978 (age 47); Chicago, Illinois, U.S.
- Occupation: Actress
- Years active: 1999–present

Karimah Westbrook (born October 6, 1978) is an American actress best known for her role as Grace James in The CW drama series, All American.

== Life and career ==
Westbrook was born and raised in Chicago, Illinois. She attended the American Academy of Dramatic Arts and later began performing on screen and stage. She made her television debut in 2000, appearing in an episode of CBS medical drama City of Angels and later was cast in the teen dance drama film Save the Last Dance. Later she starred in the biographical drama film Baadasssss! opposite Mario Van Peebles. Westbrook also guest starred in a number of television shows, include Girlfriends, Mad Men and Shameless.

Westbrook has appeared in a number of independent films, include American Violet (2008) opposite Nicole Beharie and Alfre Woodard. She played supporting roles in films The Rum Diary (2011), Suburbicon (2017), and After We Collided (2020). In 2018, she was cast as Grace James, the mother of the leading character in the CW drama series, All American.

== Filmography ==
=== Film ===
| Year | Title | Role | Notes |
|---|---|---|---|
| 2001 | Save the Last Dance | Alyssa | |
| 2002 | Random Acts of Violence | Monique | |
| 2003 | Baadasssss! | Ginnie | |
| 2004 | Knuckle Sandwich | Nora | |
| 2005 | The Tenants | Female Partygoer | |
| 2005 | American Fusion | Layla | |
| 2006 | Best Kept Secret | Cassandra | Short film, also writer and producer |
| 2007 | Studio | Jasmine Jackson | |
| 2008 | Truth Hall | Lashon | |
| 2008 | American Violet | Claudia Johnson | |
| 2010 | Louis | Alice Bolden | |
| 2011 | The Rum Diary | Papa Nebo | |
| 2012 | C'mon Man | Angel | |
| 2013 | Baby Girl | Yaya | Short film |
| 2016 | Caged | Karrisa Kline | Short film Chandler International Film Festival for Best Actress; Connect Film Festival Best Ensemble Acting Award; Nominated — IIFC Award for Best Ensemble Cast Featurette |
| 2017 | Suburbicon | Mrs. Mayers | |
| 2019 | Bolden | Alice Bolden | |
| 2020 | After We Collided | Karen Scott | |
| 2023 | Abigail | Donna | |

=== TV ===
| Year | Title | Role | Notes |
|---|---|---|---|
| 2000 | City of Angels | Joleigha Bass | Episode: "Nathan's Hot Dog" |
| 2001 | ER | Sara Morris | Episode: "April Showers" |
| 2001 | Moesha | Shania Levy | Episodes: "Graduation Day" and "All Grown Up" |
| 2001 | That's Life | Runner | Episode: "Larva" |
| 2001 | The District | Kara | Episode: "Foreign Affair" |
| 2003 | Strong Medicine | Sandy | Episode: "PMS, Lies and Red Tape" |
| 2003 | Girlfriends | Melanie Childs | Episodes: "The Wedding" and "Blood Is Thicker Than Liquor" |
| 2003 | 10-8: Officers on Duty | Sheila | Episode: "Lucy in the Sky" |
| 2006 | In Justice | Kendra Smith | Episode: "Another Country" |
| 2006 | Without a Trace | Missy | Episode: "White Balance" |
| 2010 | Mad Men | Sharon | Episode: "The Rejected" |
| 2010 | Look: The Series | Paige | Recurring role, 3 episodes |
| 2014 | The Fosters | Layla's Mother | Episode: "Mother" |
| 2014 | Masters of Sex | Delila | Episode: "Below the Belt" |
| 2015 | Aquarius | Aquarius | Episode: "The Hunter Gets Captured by the Game" |
| 2017 | Shameless | Sylvie | Episode: "Icarus Fell and Rusty Ate Him" |
| 2018 | Truth Hall | LaShon | Unsold TV pilot |
| 2018–2026 | All American | Grace James | Series regular (season 1–6), special guest (season 8); Nominated — Black Reel Award for Outstanding Supporting Actress, Drama Series (2019) |
