= Nkechi Okoro Carroll =

Nigerian-American screenwriter and producer

- Born: Nkechi Okoro; New York, United States
- Occupations: Television producer, writer, actor
- Years active: 2002–present
- Spouse: Jonathan A. Carroll
- Children: 2

Nkechi Okoro Carroll is a writer, producer, and actor. She is the executive producer for The CW drama All American and the creator of its spinoff All American: Homecoming.

== Early life ==
Carroll was born in New York, but lived in many places while growing up, including Nigeria, Côte d'Ivoire, the United States, and the United Kingdom. Her parents are Nigerian and came to the United States for college but decided to stay. Her dad was a lawyer, and when Carroll was four years old, her family moved to Nigeria for her father's job. When she was eight, Carroll's parents split, and she moved with her mom to Côte d'Ivoire near her cousins. When she was living in Nigeria, she watched a lot of television, which shaped her view of the US. From the time she was young, she wanted to be a writer. Carroll was later sent to boarding school in Oxford, England and began performing at the Oxford Youth Theater.

Carroll attended the University of Pennsylvania, where she received a BA in economics and French in 1998. During her time at Penn, she was the president of the Pan African Student Association and acted in shows with the African American Arts Alliance. After completing college, she worked as a research assistant at the Federal Reserve and acted in small theaters in the evening. She speaks multiple languages.

Carroll received a master's degree in international economics from New York University.

== Career ==
In 2004, Carroll and her husband left New York and moved to Los Angeles to pursue Carroll's dream of writing in Hollywood. Her first writing job was on The Finder. When the show ended after one season, Carroll joined the writers on Bones. Carroll worked as a co-executive producer on Rosewood and The Resident.

In March 2014, Carroll launched the group Black Women Who Brunch alongside Lena Waithe and Erika L. Johnson. The group is designed to connect black female writers working in the film industry. The group often meets at Carroll's house for potlucks. They provide job recommendations and resources for their members. The Hollywood Reporter did a story on the group's members in 2018. There were sixty-two members at the time and it was The Hollywood Reporter's largest photo shoot at the time.

In 2018, Carroll joined the crew of All American after the pilot episode, co-producing alongside April Blair, Greg Berlanti, and Sarah Schechter. In October 2018, Carroll took over as executive producer of the show, replacing Blair after Blair had to step down for personal reasons. Carroll was nominated for an NAACP Image Award for "Outstanding Writing in a Drama Series" for the All American episode "Hussle & Motivate", but ultimately did not win the award. More recently, she signed a deal with Warner Bros. Television Studios to start Rock My Soul Productions, with Lindsay Dunn serving as head of TV production.

In January 2024 she was nominated for the 55th NAACP Awards for Screenwriter and producer, Nkechi Okoro Carroll, stands tall with a nomination in the Outstanding Writing in a Drama Series category for creating NBC’s Found

== Personal life ==
Carroll is married to a high school teacher, Jonathan A. Carroll. The couple met briefly during their time at the University of Pennsylvania, but were not close. In April 2000, they both went to see a mutual friend perform at the Soul Cafe in New York City, where fellow University of Pennsylvania alumnus John Legend was the opener. Nkechi was there on a date with someone else, but soon after she and Jonathan began dating. They have two sons and currently live in Los Angeles.

Carroll is a Christian. She speaks multiple languages, and favorite television show is Buffy the Vampire Slayer. She was in the World Trade Center Annex when the planes hit the towers on September 11, 2001, and had to walk across the Brooklyn Bridge.

== Filmography ==
=== Television ===
Year	Title	Creator	Writer	Executive producer
2010–2011	A Breath of Fresh Air with Jon and Nkechi	Yes	Yes	Yes
2012	The Finder	No	Yes	No
2013–2015	Bones	No	Yes	Producer
2015–2017	Rosewood	No	Yes	Co-executive
2018	The Resident	No	Yes	Co-executive
2018–2026	All American	No	Yes	Yes
2022–2024	All American: Homecoming	Yes	Yes	Yes
2023–2025	Found	Yes	Yes	Yes
