= Spencer Paysinger =

American football player (born 1988)

No. 55, 52, 54, 42, 56
- Position: Linebacker

Personal information
- Born: June 28, 1988 (age 38); Los Angeles, California, U.S.
- Listed height: 6 ft 2 in (1.88 m)
- Listed weight: 236 lb (107 kg)

Career information
- High school: Beverly Hills (Beverly Hills, California)
- College: Oregon (2006–2010)
- NFL draft: 2011: undrafted

Career history
- New York Giants (2011–2014); Miami Dolphins (2015–2016); New York Jets (2017)*; Carolina Panthers (2017)
- * Offseason or practice squad member only

Awards and highlights
- Super Bowl champion (XLVI)

Career NFL statistics
- Total tackles: 224
- Sacks: 1
- Forced fumbles: 1
- Fumble recoveries: 5
- Stats at Pro Football Reference

Spencer Paysinger (born June 28, 1988) is an American former professional football player who was a linebacker in the National Football League (NFL). He played college football for the Oregon Ducks. He was signed by the New York Giants as an undrafted free agent in 2011. He played until 2017, and in 2018 became a co-producer and actor on the television series All American, inspired by the story of his life.

== Early life and college ==
Spencer Paysinger grew up in South Los Angeles, and attended Beverly Hills High School. He then was made the captain of the football team as a linebacker. He played college football for the Oregon Ducks. In his last year playing as a senior on the team, Paysinger was the captain and team leader.

His uncle, Carter Paysinger, was the head football coach at BHHS from 1990 to 2009. His father, Donald Paysinger, worked with BHHS as an assistant or head coach for nearly 32 years until 2013.

== Professional career ==
=== New York Giants ===
After not getting selected in the 2011 NFL draft, Paysinger signed with the New York Giants as an undrafted free agent. As a rookie Paysinger did not get much playing time. In 15 games he racked up 12 tackles. He was a part of the Super Bowl XLVI winning team. In the next three seasons with the Giants, he racked up 104 tackles in 47 games. In the 2014 season, he got his first and only NFL career sack.

=== Miami Dolphins ===
Paysinger signed a one-year contract with the Miami Dolphins on April 2, 2015. He was re-signed by the Dolphins on March 31, 2016.

=== New York Jets ===
On June 9, 2017, Paysinger was signed by the New York Jets. He was released on September 1, 2017 before the season started.

=== Carolina Panthers ===
On December 5, 2017, Paysinger signed with the Carolina Panthers. He played in three games, before being released by the team on December 29, 2017. He then retired from football.

== NFL career statistics ==
Legend
**Bold**	Career high

=== Regular season ===
Year	Team	Games		Tackles					Interceptions					Fumbles			
Year	Team	GP	GS	Cmb	Solo	Ast	Sck	TFL	Int	Yds	TD	Lng	PD	FF	FR	Yds	TD
2011	NYG	15	0	12	11	1	0.0	0	0	0	0	0	0	0	1	0	0
2012	NYG	**16**	3	39	27	12	0.0	**2**	0	0	0	0	0	**1**	1	0	0
2013	NYG	**16**	**10**	**74**	**65**	9	**1.0**	0	0	0	0	0	1	0	1	0	0
2014	NYG	15	1	15	12	3	0.0	0	0	0	0	0	0	0	0	0	0
2015	MIA	14	0	25	15	10	0.0	0	0	0	0	0	0	0	0	0	0
2016	MIA	15	3	59	42	**17**	0.0	0	0	0	0	0	**3**	0	**2**	0	0
2017	CAR	3	0	0	0	0	0.0	0	0	0	0	0	0	0	0	0	0
		94	17	224	172	52	1.0	2	0	0	0	0	4	1	5	0	0

=== Playoffs ===
Year	Team	Games		Tackles					Interceptions					Fumbles			
Year	Team	GP	GS	Cmb	Solo	Ast	Sck	TFL	Int	Yds	TD	Lng	PD	FF	FR	Yds	TD
2011	NYG	**4**	0	**3**	**2**	**1**	0.0	0	0	0	0	0	0	0	0	0	0
2016	MIA	1	0	2	**2**	0	0.0	0	0	0	0	0	0	0	0	0	0
		5	0	5	4	1	0.0	0	0	0	0	0	0	0	0	0	0

== Television series ==
Paysingers's life and career served as inspiration for the 2018 The CW series All American where he is a consulting producer and has a minor role as assistant football coach at Beverly Hills High. Paysinger said of the show “It’s immensely important. I know it’s a CW drama, but for the bones of it to center on football, that is something that I take pride in.”
