= Bambra (surname) =

Bambra is a surname that is believed to derive from Bamber Bridge in Lancashire, England. Notable people with the surname include:

- Jim Bambra (born 1956), British designer
- Manpreet Bambra (born 1992), English actress
