= Bruce Herbelin-Earle =

English-French actor and model (born 1998)

- Born: Bruce Charles Herbelin-Earle; 1998 (age 27–28); East Grinstead, West Sussex, England
- Occupations: Actor; model
- Years active: 2016–present
- Modelling information
- Height: 190 cm (6 ft 3 in)
- Hair colour: Black
- Eye colour: Green
- Agency: IMG Models

Bruce Charles Herbelin-Earle (born 1998) is an English-French actor and model, known for portraying the role of Marcus Greenbridge on the Netflix drama series Free Rein (2017–2020). He is signed to IMG Models.

== Early life ==
Herbelin-Earle attended Imberhorne School.

== Career ==
At the age of sixteen, Herbelin-Earle began looking at online casting calls, and auditioned for a role in the Disney Channel series The Lodge. Despite not getting the role, he was put into contact with an agent. Herbelin-Earle then auditioned for the role of Marcus Greenbridge in the Netflix drama series Free Rein, and as part of the process, he had to ride a horse, which he described as "terrifying". Talking about the audition to Wonderland, he stated that he had "no idea" about horse-riding, and that the other person auditioning for the role was "terrific" at it. He was told the day afterwards that he had gotten the role, which he portrayed until 2019. In 2018, Herbelin-Earle starred in and was the executive producer of a short film titled Wretched Things. Speaking about the decision to become the executive producer of the project, he said that he "wanted to more to be more involved with the project in an off-screen capacity", and that it "made it more like a collaborative project rather than me just coming in, doing my bit, and heading home". Later that year, he portrayed the role of Harry in the feature film 2: Hrs. Although he initially auditioned for the lead role, he stated that appreciated getting a role in the film regardless. Also in 2018, he appeared in an episode of the BBC medical drama series Casualty. In 2019, he starred in the Channel 5 miniseries 15 Days as Josh, alongside Free Rein co-star Freddy Carter. He described 15 Days as "great to film", and noted the "very different vibe" to Free Rein. In 2020, he is set to star in an episode of the Amazon Prime programme A Series of Light, which he cowrote.

== Filmography ==
Year	Title	Role	Notes
2016	Closure	Alex	Short film
2016	Family Business	Kevin	Short film
2016	Open All Night	Snake	Film
2017	The Rizen	Woodland Soldier	Film
2017–2019	Free Rein	Marcus Greenbridge	Main role
2018	Wretched Things	Kyle	Short film; also executive producer
2018	2: Hrs	Harry	Film
2018	Casualty	Finn Barling	1 episode
2018	Free Rein: The 12 Neighs of Christmas	Marcus Greenbridge	Netflix film
2019	Free Rein: Valentine's Day	Marcus Greenbridge	Netflix film
2019	15 Days	Josh	Main role
2020	Homestay	Chris	Short film
2020	A Series of Light	Nils	Episode: "Greenlight"; also writer
2023	The Boys in the Boat	Shorty Hunt	

=== Theatre ===
Year	Title	Role	Director	Playwright	Theatre
2025	The Talented Mr. Ripley	Dickie Greenleaf	Mark Leipacher	Patricia Highsmith	The Lowry
