= Five Nights at Freddy's 2 (film) =

2025 film directed by Emma Tammi

- Theatrical release poster
- Directed by: Emma Tammi
- Written by: Scott Cawthon
- Based on: Five Nights at Freddy's 2 by Scott Cawthon
- Produced by: Scott Cawthon; Jason Blum
- Starring: Josh Hutcherson; Elizabeth Lail; Piper Rubio; Mckenna Grace; Wayne Knight; Skeet Ulrich; Matthew Lillard
- Cinematography: Lyn Moncrief
- Edited by: Tim Alverson; Derek Larsen
- Music by: The Newton Brothers
- Production company: Blumhouse Productions
- Distributed by: Universal Pictures
- Release dates: December 2, 2025 (TCL Chinese Theater); December 5, 2025 (United States)
- Running time: 104 minutes
- Country: United States
- Language: English
- Budget: $36–51 million
- Box office: $239.6 million

Five Nights at Freddy's 2 is a 2025 American supernatural horror film based on the video game series Five Nights at Freddy's created by Scott Cawthon and the sequel to the 2023 film adaptation. The film was directed by Emma Tammi and written by Cawthon. Josh Hutcherson, Elizabeth Lail, Piper Rubio, and Matthew Lillard reprise their roles from the previous film, with Mckenna Grace, Wayne Knight, and Skeet Ulrich joining the cast. Set a year and a half after the previous film, it follows Abby Schmidt (Rubio) as she is manipulated by the Marionette, an animatronic from the original Freddy Fazbear's Pizza, who plots revenge against adults.

Cawthon stated in August 2018 that there could be a second Five Nights at Freddy's film based on the events of the series' second game if the first film were successful. Hutcherson revealed the development of a sequel in January 2024, with Blumhouse Productions confirming it three months later. Principal photography began in November 2024 and concluded in February 2025 in New Orleans and surrounding communities.

Five Nights at Freddy's 2 premiered at the TCL Chinese Theater on December 2, 2025, and was released in the United States by Universal Pictures on December 5. The film received negative reviews from critics but was a commercial success, grossing $240 million worldwide against a budget between $36–51 million.

== Plot ==
In 1982, at the first Freddy Fazbear's Pizza restaurant, Charlotte Emily witnesses its co-founder William Afton lure a boy into the back rooms to kill him. Her pleas for help are ignored by nearby parents, so she rescues the boy herself despite the protestations of her best friend Vanessa, William's daughter. Charlotte is fatally stabbed by William, falls through an onstage trapdoor, and is held by the Marionette animatronic. The incident is suppressed, and the restaurant is subsequently shut down. Another restaurant in the Freddy Fazbear's franchise opens some time later, where William murders five more children. (Note: As depicted in Five Nights at Freddy's (2023).)

In 2002, two years after William was killed by the spirits of his victims at the franchise location, the legends of the murders spawn a horror festival called "Fazfest". Abby Schmidt misses her ghostly friends and repeatedly asks her older brother Mike to repair the animatronics they inhabited. Believing the spirits are dangerous and have moved on, Mike repeatedly makes excuses until Abby returns to the franchise location herself. Mike finds her there, apologizes for lying, and discovers a talking toy called the FazTalker. Meanwhile, the adult Vanessa struggles with the trauma of her father's crimes and abuse.

Ghost hunters Lisa, Alex, and Rob tour the original restaurant with its security guard Michael. Lisa finds and deactivates a music box, awakening the Marionette, which is possessed by Charlotte's vengeful spirit. The Marionette possesses Lisa, takes control of the restaurant's "Toy" animatronics, and kills Alex and Rob. Abby receives a message on the FazTalker from Toy Chica, whom she believes to be the Chica possessed by her friend from the franchise restaurant. She visits the original location, where Toy Chica helps her build a robot for a school science fair. Vanessa grows concerned for Abby's safety after learning this, but Mike dismisses her, having learned of Charlotte's murder and of Vanessa's connection to it.

Vanessa travels to the original restaurant, discovers the Marionette has awakened, and is captured by the possessed Lisa. However, the animatronics cannot leave unless their safeguards are disabled. Meanwhile, Abby's science project is destroyed by her unsupportive teacher, Mr. Berg. She returns to the original restaurant and disables the safeguards at Toy Chica's request to be her new project. While meeting with Charlotte's father Henry, Mike learns that Abby has gone missing from school. Mike heads to the original restaurant after Henry gives him a new music box to leave there for Charlotte.

At Abby's school, Toy Chica kills Mr. Berg. The other Toy animatronics begin hunting parents, whom Charlotte seeks revenge against for ignoring her pleas for help. Mike frees Vanessa, who pursues the Toy animatronics, while Mike remains at the original restaurant to remotely track them while fending off Withered prototype animatronics. The Marionette, having abandoned Lisa's corpse to hide inside Toy Chica, possesses Abby. Realizing they are outnumbered, Mike returns to the franchise restaurant and pleads for the possessed animatronics to help Abby.

Mike and Vanessa return to Mike's home, where he uses the music box to lull the Marionette back to sleep and free Abby. They are surrounded by the Toy animatronics and Vanessa's brother Michael, who wants to continue William's murders. He orders the Toy animatronics to kill them, but the possessed animatronics arrive and destroy the Toy animatronics, before their safeguards cause them to shut down; Michael escapes. The spirits possessing the animatronics enter the afterlife, warning that they will no longer be able to hold "him" back. Mike leaves with Abby, telling Vanessa to stay away as he no longer trusts her. Alone, Vanessa is possessed by the Marionette.

At the franchise location, the animatronic suit containing William's body is found and activates. (Note: Identified off-screen as Springtrap.)

== Cast ==
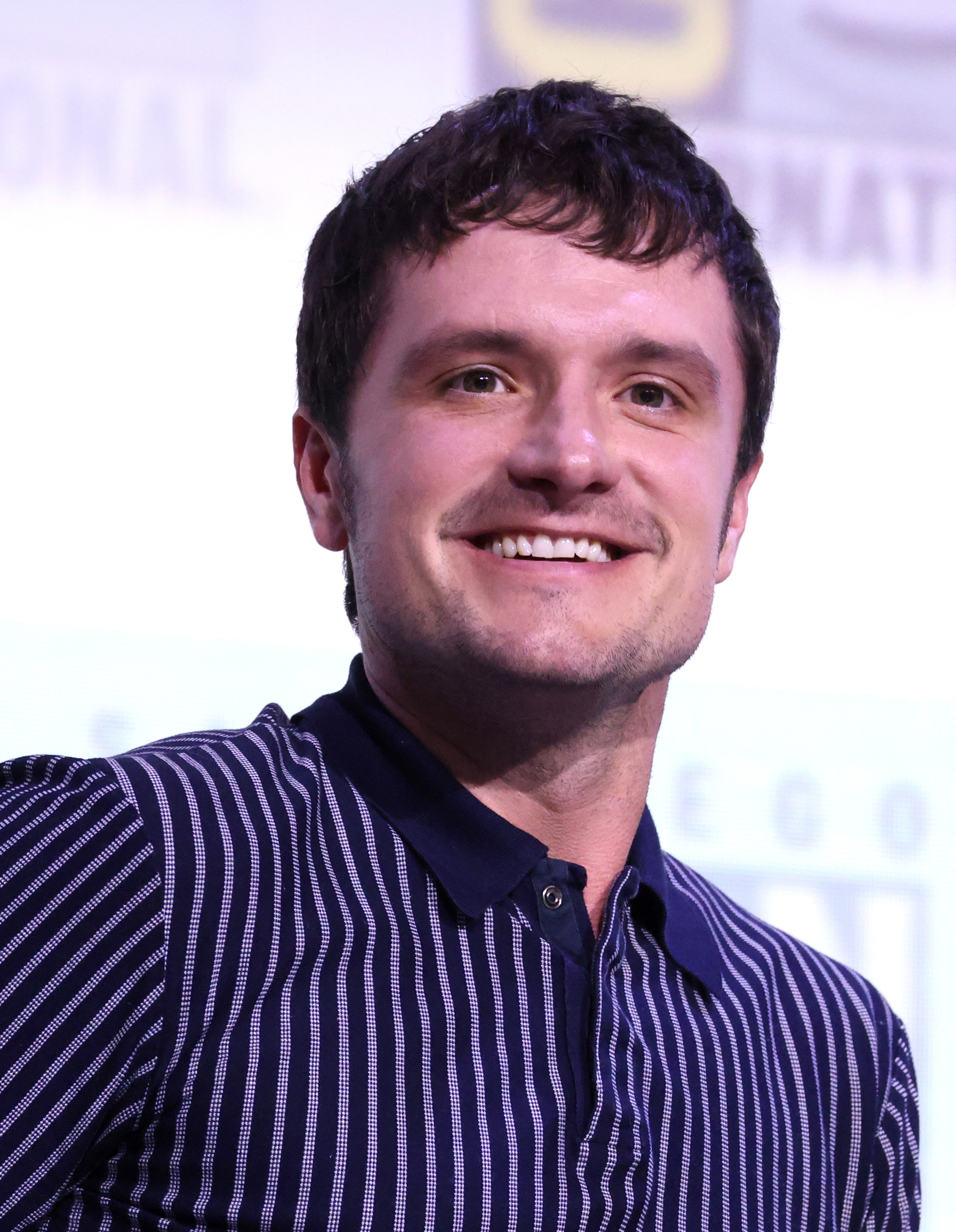
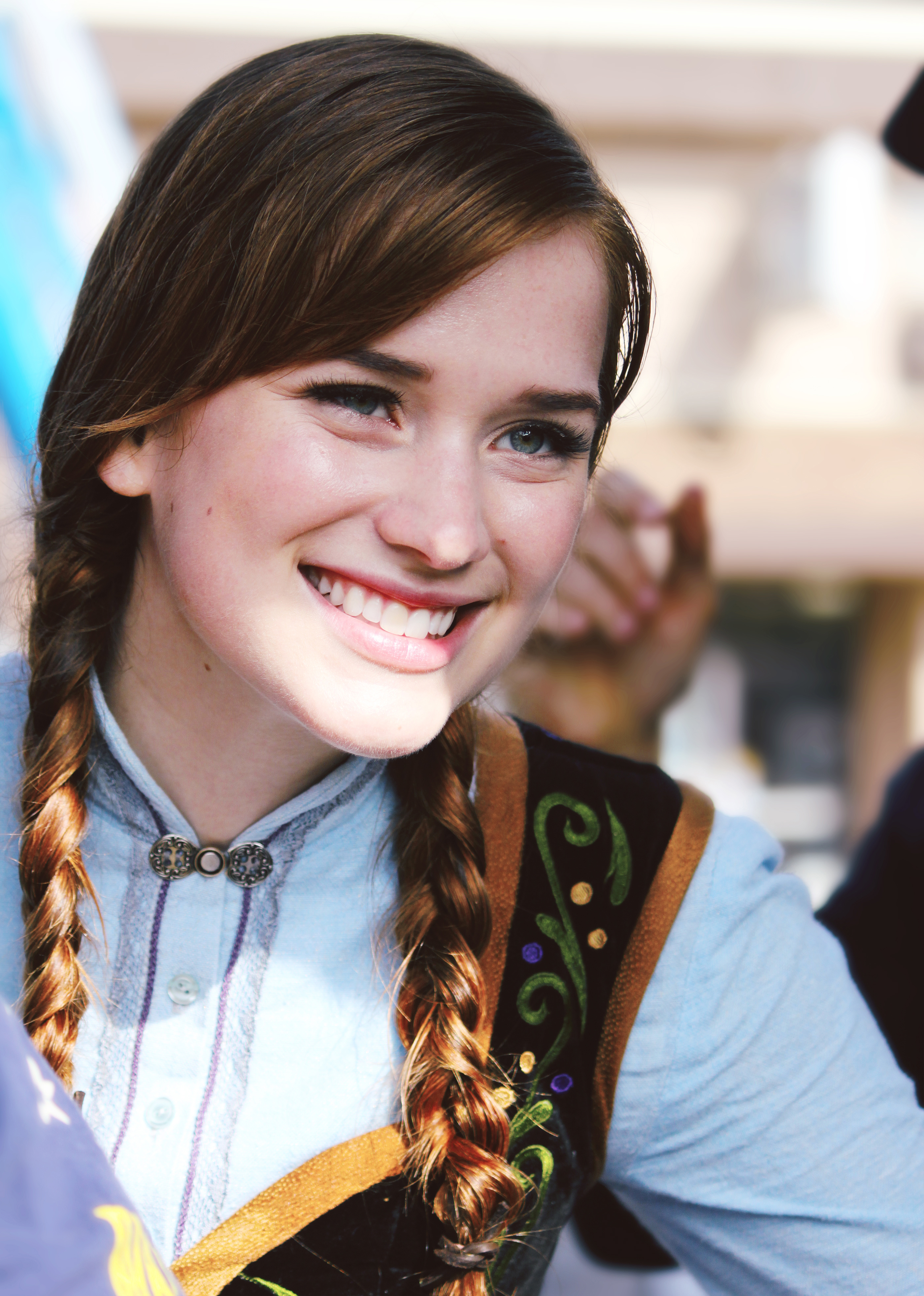
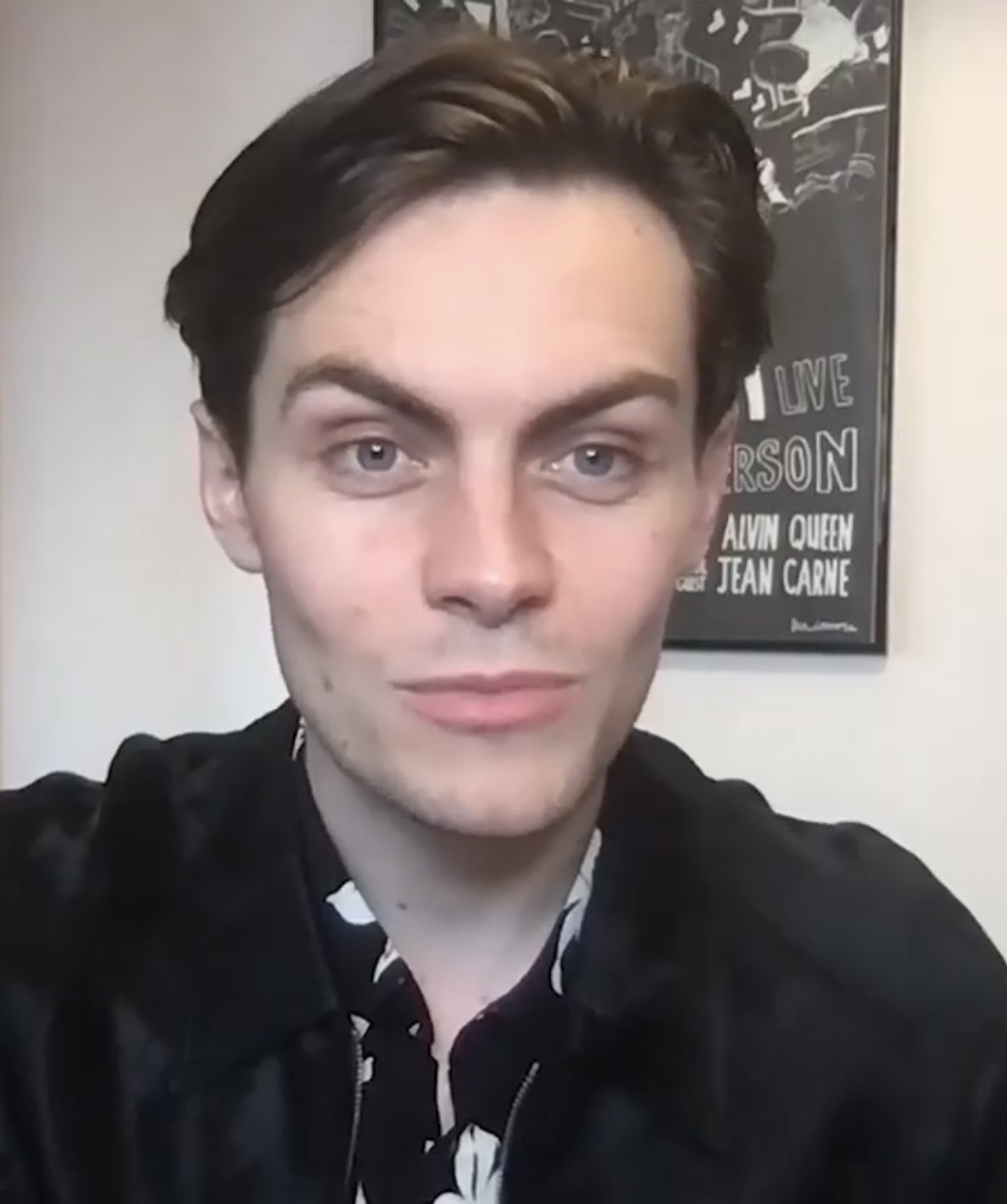
Josh Hutcherson and Elizabeth Lail reprise their roles as Mike Schmidt and Vanessa Shelly, while Freddy Carter plays Michael Afton.
- Josh Hutcherson as Mike Schmidt, a former security guard at Freddy Fazbear's Pizza
- Elizabeth Lail as Vanessa Shelly, a local police officer and William Afton's daughter.
  - Miriam Spumpkin plays a young Vanessa during the scenes set in the 1980s.
- Piper Rubio as Abby Schmidt, Mike's younger sister
- Freddy Carter as Michael Afton, a security guard at Freddy's, Vanessa's brother, and William's son
- Theodus Crane as Jeremiah, Mike's former co-worker
- Wayne Knight as Mr. Berg, Abby's middle school science teacher
- Teo Briones as Alex, a paranormal activity hunter
- Mckenna Grace as Lisa, a paranormal activity hunter
- Skeet Ulrich as Henry Emily, the father of Charlotte Emily and business partner of William Afton
- Matthew Lillard as William Afton, a serial killer, founder of Freddy Fazbear's Pizza, and Vanessa and Michael's father
- Kellen Goff as the voice of Toy Freddy. Goff also portrays an attendee at Faz-Fest and provides Foxy's scatting.
- Megan Fox as the voice of Toy Chica
- Matthew "MatPat" Patrick as the voice of Toy Bonnie. Patrick previously made a cameo appearance in the first film.
- Audrey Lynn Marie as Charlotte Emily, the late daughter of Henry Emily who possesses the Marionette
- David Andrew Calvillo as Rob, a paranormal activity hunter
- Grant Feely as the murdered boy whose soul is possessing Golden Freddy
- Cory Williams as a taxi driver. Williams reprises his role as the same cab driver from the first film.

== Production ==
=== Development ===
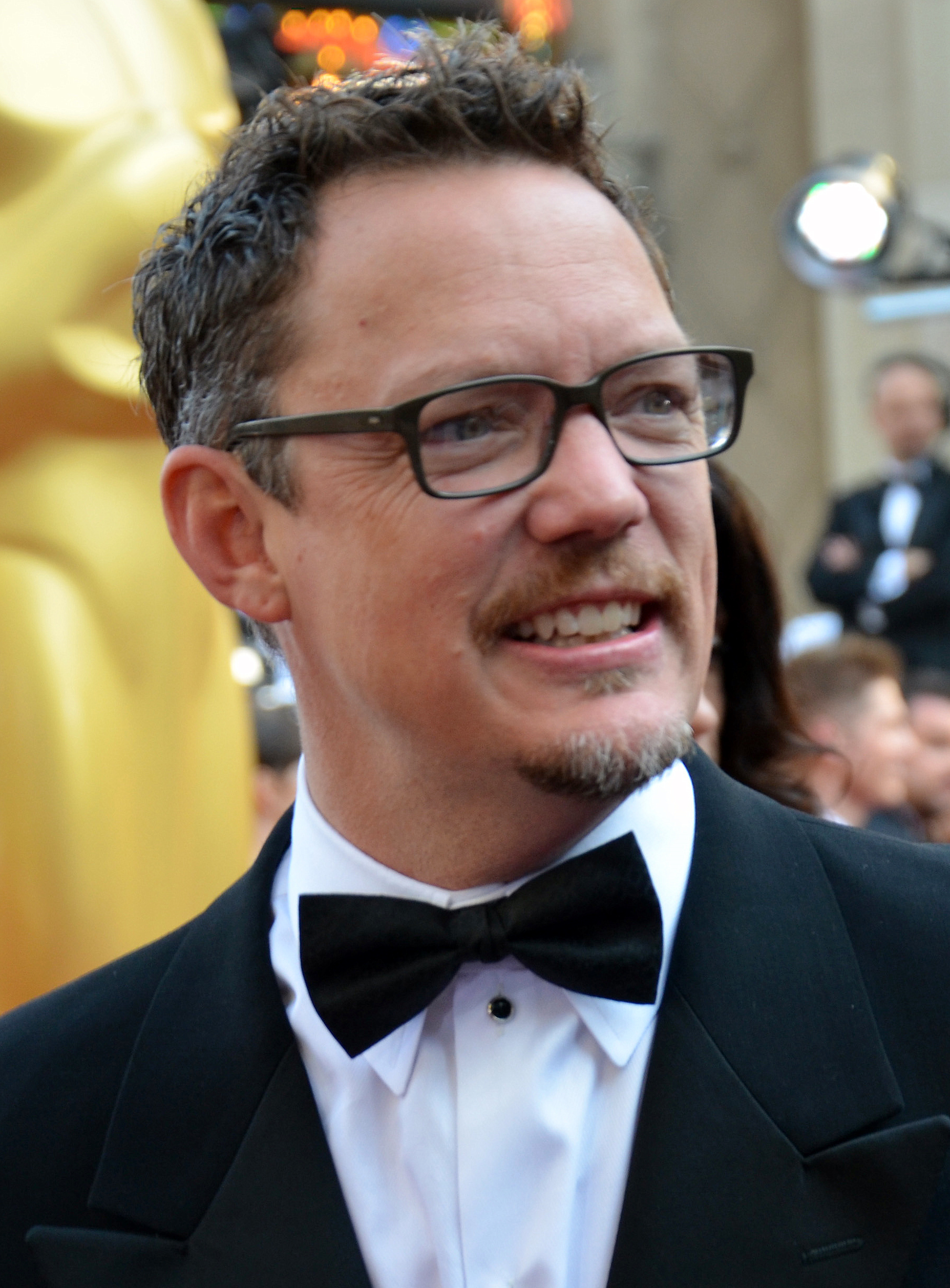
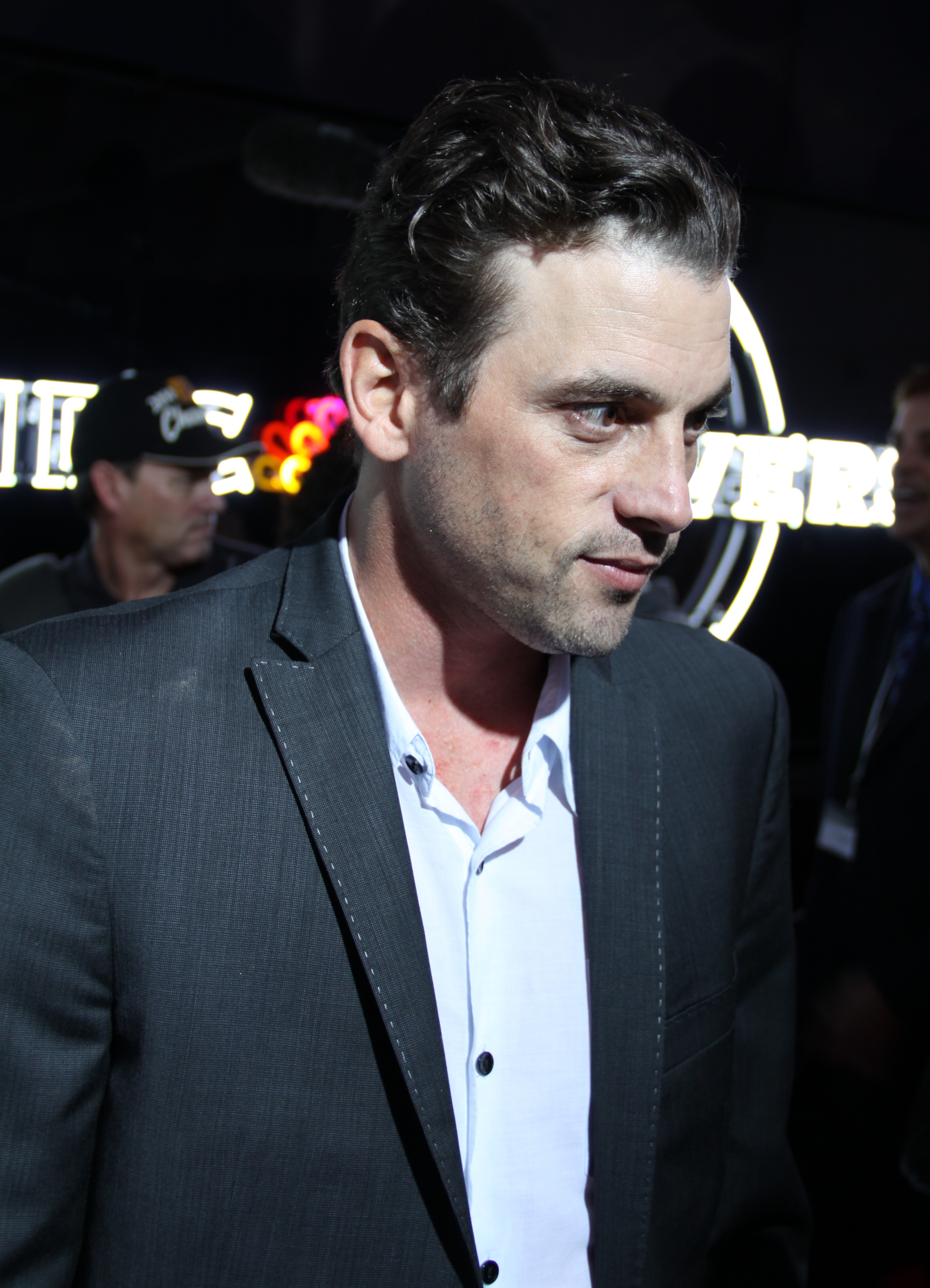
Matthew Lillard returned as William Afton, while Skeet Ulrich, who previously starred alongside Lillard in Scream, was cast as Henry Emily.

In August 2018, Scott Cawthon said that if the first film were to be successful, there could be a second film that follows the events of the second game. A sequel was revealed to be in development by Josh Hutcherson, the actor who portrayed the role of Mike Schmidt in the previous film, in January 2024. In April 2024, Jason Blum's Blumhouse Productions officially confirmed the sequel, and that Jim Henson's Creature Shop would return to design animatronics for the film. In October 2024, Hutcherson, Elizabeth Lail, Piper Rubio, and Matthew Lillard were confirmed to reprise their roles; the latter of whom had signed a three-picture deal with the studios.

In April 2025, Wayne Knight, Mckenna Grace, and Teo Briones joined the cast in undisclosed roles. Skeet Ulrich, who previously starred alongside Lillard in Scream (1996), later joined the cast in a then-undisclosed role. On October 10, 2025, Kellen Goff, Megan Fox, and Matthew Patrick were announced as the voices of the animatronics.

=== Writing ===
Scott Cawthon was the sole screenwriter; he had already co-written the first film, alongside Seth Cuddeback and Emma Tammi. Matthew Lillard stated that the production crew had carefully addressed fan feedback from the first film, hinting that the film might include more action and jump scares as well as an "amped-up" story. According to Blum, the script for the sequel required only four or five drafts compared to the first film, which had around fourteen.

Tammi stated that she hopes for the film to be special and unexpected while focusing on what the fans want, hinting a lot of Easter eggs and references, though she also believes that casual audiences can still follow and enjoy the film even if they "don't understand all the layers."

=== Filming ===
Principal photography was expected to start in late October 2024. At New York Comic-Con on October 17, Matthew Lillard stated that filming would start in "10 days", putting the filming date at October 27 specifically. Filming began by November 2024 and wrapped in February 2025, with Lyn Moncrief serving as the cinematographer.

== Release ==
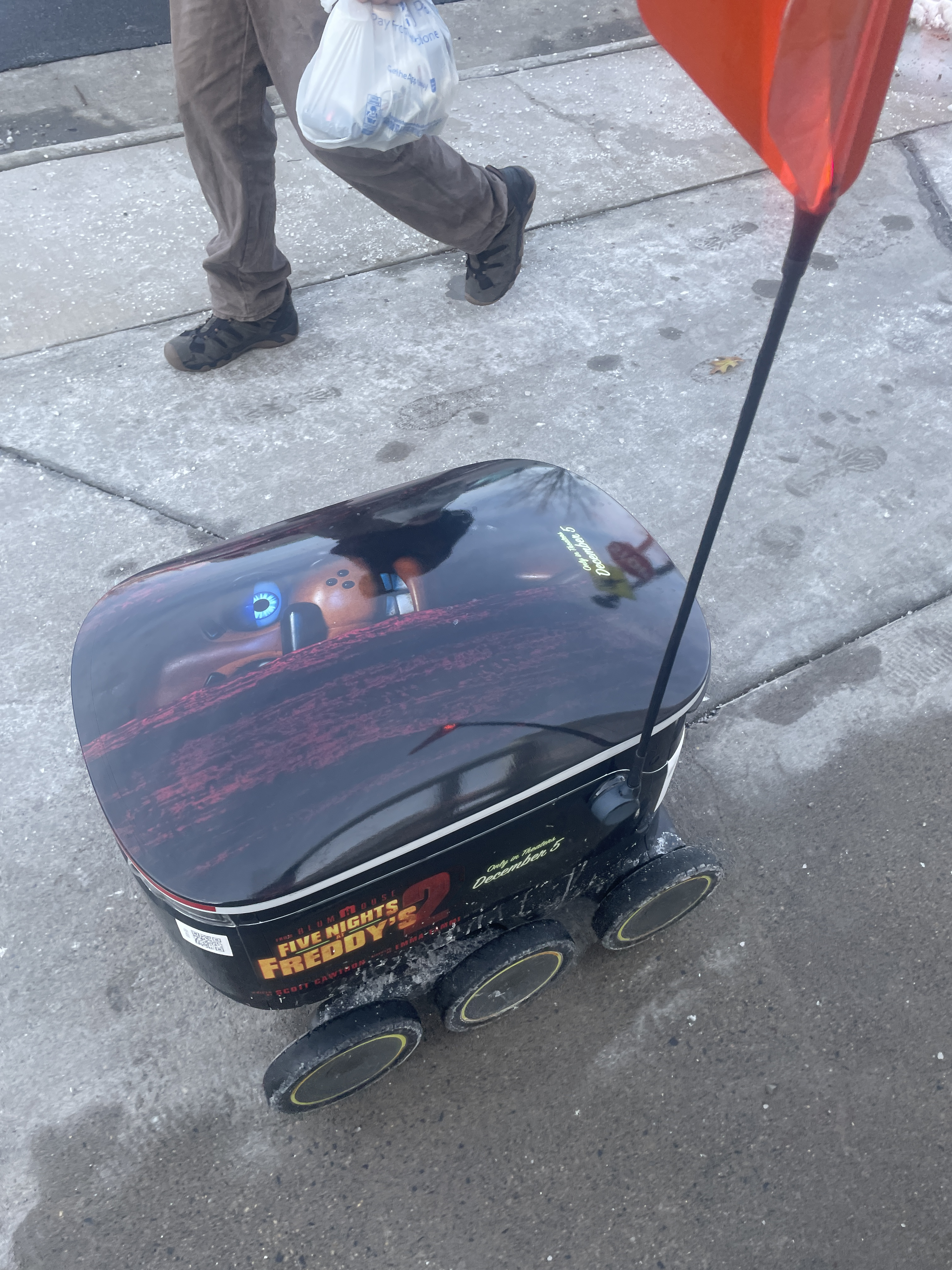
A Starship food delivery drone advertising Five Nights at Freddy's 2 at James Madison University.

In August 2025, an attraction based on the first film was added to Universal's Halloween Horror Nights to promote the second film. A limited-time promotion with Fanta was released around the same time. On November 17, Popeyes released a promotional meal for the movie. A set of photos were leaked online in January 2025. The making-of book Five Nights at Freddy's: The Official Art and Making of the Movies was originally set to be released on August 20, 2024, only covering the first film, but was delayed to November 3rd, 2026 to add material based on the sequel.

Five Nights at Freddy's 2 premiered at the TCL Chinese Theater on December 2, 2025, and was released in the United States on December 5, by Universal Pictures. The film was released on digital on December 23, 2025, and was released on 4K Ultra HD, Blu-ray, and DVD on February 17.

== Reception ==
=== Box office ===
Five Nights at Freddy's 2 has grossed $127.7 million in the United States and Canada, and $111.9 million in other territories, for a worldwide total of $239.6 million. It was produced on a budget of $36–51 million.

In the United States and Canada, Five Nights at Freddy's 2 opened on December 5, 2025. It made $24.5 million on its first day, including $7.2 million in Thursday night previews. The film grossed $64 million in its opening weekend, reaching number 1 at the domestic box office. In its second weekend, the film grossed $19.4 million, ranking second for a decline of -69.7%, and later grossed $7.7 million in its third weekend, dropping to sixth for a decline of -60.5%.

=== Critical response ===
Five Nights at Freddy's 2 received negative reviews from critics, who deemed that it was more ambitious than its predecessor, but fell flat on both storytelling and scares. On the review aggregator website Rotten Tomatoes, 17% of 131 critics' reviews are positive, with an average rating of 3.9/10. The website's consensus reads: "A step down from an already clunky original, Five Nights at Freddy's 2 goes through the motions with all the grace of a malfunctioning animatronic." Metacritic, which uses a weighted average, assigned the film a score of 26 out of 100, based on 24 critics, indicating "generally unfavorable" reviews. Audiences polled by CinemaScore gave the film an average grade of "B" on an A+ to F scale, down from the first film's "A−" grade.

In his review for the Associated Press, Mark Kennedy gave the film zero stars out of four, deriding it as "an incoherent mess", having "an after-school special vibe with no real horror and no real awareness that it should". The A.V. Club offered a harsher critique, citing the film's pacing, exposition, and difficulty balancing horror elements with its dense mythos, ultimately calling it a disappointing follow-up that struggles to stand on its own. In a negative review, Cody Dericks of Next Best Picture criticized the film's screenplay, storytelling, and reliance on fan service, calling it "perhaps the worst film of the year" and stating that it offered "nothing of value" beyond the animatronics. He ultimately awarded the sequel a score of 1 out of 10. Gary Goldstein of the Los Angeles Times criticized the film as a "laughably cheesy" and "empty-headed" sequel, arguing that its script, dialogue, pacing, and lack of tension make it inferior to the first film. He described the set pieces as "thrill-free," the acting as "subpar", and the animatronics as often "silly and toothless," concluding that the sequel is suited "for die-hards only."

James Mottram of NME awarded the film 1 out of 5 stars, calling it a "sauceless" and "dismal" sequel that lacks originality, scares, and humor. He criticized its lore expansion and what he described as one of the "poorest movies of 2025". Owen Gleiberman of Variety acknowledged the film's stronger visuals and polished production values compared to its predecessor, but argued that its "excess of subplots" and heavy reliance on franchise lore might alienate casual audiences. In his review for The Guardian, Jesse Hassenger described Five Nights at Freddy's 2 as one of the worst films of the year, calling it "inept game-based horror". Nick Schager of The Daily Beast called the film "one of the worst video-game movies ever," criticizing its screenplay and what he described as "fright-free mush" that fails to build on the original. He argued that the sequel relied on jump scares, underwritten characters, and inconsistent mythology, concluding that it "makes no effort to be frightening or engaging." The Hollywood Reporter review by Frank Scheck described the film as a sequel that largely repeated its predecessor.

Alonso Duralde of The Film Verdict called the film a "dull and incompetent sequel," criticizing its reliance on jump scares, character decisions, and what he described as a "blisteringly stupid screenplay." He argued that the sequel failed to expand its appeal beyond fans of the games and "makes no effort to offer anything beyond jerky, blinking robots." Tim Grierson of Screen Daily gave the film a negative review, arguing that despite the impressive animatronic work by Jim Henson's Creature Shop, the sequel was "as inanimate as its predecessor," lacking scares, tension, and narrative cohesion. He criticized the film's reliance on jump scares, character arcs, and set pieces, concluding that the sequel "never breaks free of its own conventionality." In his review on Screen Rant, Alex Harrison gave Five Nights at Freddy's 2 a rating of 3 out of 10. He critiqued the film as a "mess", despite its higher production values and ambitious storytelling.

Ian Freer of Empire gave Five Nights at Freddy’s 2 two out of five stars, calling it a "weak" sequel. He criticized the animatronics, the reliance on jump scares, and writing and performances. Bilge Ebiri of Vulture gave the film a negative review, describing it as a "bleak" and "confused" sequel and criticized its atmosphere and called the Marionette's introduction "boring," concluding that young fans "deserve better." Petrana Radulovic of Polygon criticized the film for its storytelling and reliance on game knowledge, arguing that Five Nights at Freddy's 2 "gets lost in its own lore" and leaves newcomers feeling excluded. Beatrice Loayza of The New York Times review of Five Nights at Freddy's 2 described it as a "marginally bigger and badder sequel that still struggles with sluggish pacing and bland dialogue. While it offers more intricate set pieces and some solid kill scenes, the film remains as tame and creaky as its signature animatronics, ultimately overworked and lacking tension."

/Film was also negative, awarding the sequel a 4 out of 10. The review praised the practical animatronic effects and some successful moments of tension reminiscent of the original game, but criticized the screenplay. Megan Garside of GamesRadar+ praised the film's upgraded animatronics and a handful of scares, but criticized its "confusing and muddled storyline", character development, and felt that actors such as Matthew Lillard and Skeet Ulrich were underused. Jim Slotek of Original-Cin gave the film a C+, saying that "Five Nights at Freddy's 2 is messy and unfocused but works as a fan-centric sequel packed with in-jokes, references, and energetic animatronic chaos." Aidan Kelley’s review on Collider highlighted improvements in animatronics and practical effects but criticized the character development.

In a positive review, Simon Abrams of RogerEbert.com gave the film three stars out of four, praising its storytelling, visuals, and horror-adventure tone.

Common Sense Media gave the film one star out of five, describing it as an "[a]bysmal, illogical, and unwatchable horror sequel".

In December 2025, the film was ranked second on a Variety list of "The Worst Movies of 2025" by Owen Gleiberman and Peter Debruge.

=== Accolades ===
Award	Date of ceremony	Category	Nominee(s)	Result	Ref.
Golden Raspberry Awards	March 14, 2026	Worst Remake, Rip-off or Sequel	Five Nights at Freddy's 2	Nominated	
Fangoria Chainsaw Awards	October 25, 2026	Best Creature FX	Jim Henson's Creature Shop	Won	

== See also ==
- List of films based on video games
