= Geffri Maya =

American actress

- Born: Geffri Maya Hightower; February 25, 1995 (age 31); Los Angeles, California
- Occupation: Actress
- Years active: 2006–present

Geffri Maya Hightower (born February 25, 1995), also known as Geffri Maya, is an American actress. She is best known for playing Simone Hicks in the sports drama series All American and its spinoff All American: Homecoming.

== Early life ==
Maya was born in Los Angeles, California on February 25, 1995 to single mother Stephanie Renee Hightower. She graduated from Clark Atlanta University, where she studied mass communications and journalism.

== Career ==
Maya made her debut on Broadway at the age of 9, playing Young Nala in a production of The Lion King. She gained popularity playing Maya Bennett on the medical drama series Private Practice. Her first big role came playing Simone Hicks in the sports drama series All American. She has said that playing the character has made her a stronger person despite it being a depressing role.

== Filmography ==
=== Film ===
Year	Title	Role	Notes
2014	Q & A	Girl	Short
2015	Southern Lights Over-Exposed: The Visual Album	Girl	Short
2015	Blaq Gold	Jasmine Hardaway	
2016	Defending Daddy	Adult Mandy	Short
2019	With(out) You	Delphine	Short
2019	Beast Mode	Girl	
2020	Loco	Lydia	

=== Television ===
Year	Title	Role	Notes
2006	Jericho	Allison	Episode; Fallout
2008	Everybody Hates Chris	Latrinda	Episode; Everybody Hates Ex-Cons
2007-2010	Private Practice	Maya Bennett	12 episodes
2015	Finding Carter	Woman	Episode; The Sound and the Fury
2016	The Inspectors	Kristin Masterantonio	Episode; The Great Postal Truck Robbery
2016-2017	Cream X Coffee	Bridesmaid #1	Episode; Black Love Matters
2017	Shots Fired	Eufaula	Episode; Hour Seven: Content of Their Character
2017	Nasty Habits	Sky	Episode; Somebody's Mom
2018	The Pre-Quarter Life Crisis	Kevin-Rose Hankins	10 episodes
2018	East of La Brea	Aisha	Episode; Stay Walking
2019	WTF Baron Davis	Zoe	7 episodes
2024	Black-ish	Zion	2 episodes
2021	Snowfall	Khadijah Brown	7 episodes
2019-2022	All American	Simone Hicks	27 episodes
2022-2024	All American: Homecoming	Simone Hicks	41 episodes
