= Tomb Raider (TV series) =

Upcoming Tomb Raider Amazon series

- Based on: Tomb Raider by Crystal Dynamics (Note: Tomb Raider was created by Toby Gard and Paul Douglas, and developed by Core Design from 1996 to 2003, and formerly published by Eidos Interactive from 1996 to 2008 and Square Enix from 2010 to 2021. It has been developed by Crystal Dynamics since 2006, which also owned it since 2022 following its acquisition by the Embracer Group.)
- Developed by: Phoebe Waller-Bridge
- Showrunners: Phoebe Waller-Bridge; Chad Hodge
- Starring: Sophie Turner; Martin Bobb-Semple; Sigourney Weaver; Jason Isaacs; Bill Paterson
- Countries of origin: United States; United Kingdom
- Original language: English

Production
- Executive producers: Phoebe Waller-Bridge; Chad Hodge; Jonathan van Tulleken; Jenny Robbins; Dmitri M. Johnson; Mike Goldberg; Timothy I. Stevenson; Michael Scheel
- Production companies: Amazon MGM Studios; Crystal Dynamics; Wells Street Productions; Story Kitchen; Legendary Television

Original release
- Network: Amazon Prime Video

Tomb Raider is an upcoming television series developed by Phoebe Waller-Bridge for Amazon Prime Video. Based on the action-adventure video game franchise created by Toby Gard and Paul Douglas, the series stars Sophie Turner as Lara Croft alongside Martin Bobb-Semple, Sigourney Weaver, Jason Isaacs, and Bill Paterson.

The series was announced in January 2023 by Amazon following the expansion of their 2022 deal with Crystal Dynamics to publish the video game franchise and produce live-action projects through Amazon MGM Studios. Waller-Bridge signed on to develop the project, with Legendary Television and Story Kitchen, who previously acquired the franchise adaptation rights, producing. Turner was cast as Lara Croft in September 2025, while the rest of the cast was announced throughout the year. Principal photography began in January 2026 in England and Spain.

Tomb Raider is set to be released on Amazon Prime Video.

== Cast and characters ==
- Sophie Turner as Lara Croft
- Martin Bobb-Semple as Zip
- Sigourney Weaver as Evelyn Wallis
- Jason Isaacs as Atlas DeMornay
- Bill Paterson as Winston
- Jack Bannon as Gerry
- John Heffernan as David
- Celia Imrie as Francine
- Paterson Joseph
- Sasha Luss
- Juliette Motamed
- August Wittgenstein

== Production ==
=== Development ===
Following the cancellation of a sequel to the 2018 film adaptation in July 2022 which resulted in Metro-Goldwyn-Mayer (MGM) losing the film rights, the Embracer Group, who own Crystal Dynamics, launched a bidding war for the rights to the franchise. The rights were ultimately acquired by Dmitri M. Johnson's Story Kitchen (formerly dj2 Entertainment) and Legendary Entertainment, who then produced the animated television series Tomb Raider: The Legend of Lara Croft for Netflix, while in December 2022, Amazon signed a deal with Crystal Dynamics to publish future installments of the video game franchise.

In late January 2023, The Hollywood Reporter reported that the company expanded their deal to produce live-action projects, and that Phoebe Waller-Bridge was developing a Tomb Raider television series for Amazon Prime Video. Story Kitchen and Legendary Television were confirmed as the companies producing the series, following them previously acquiring the adaptations rights, while Megan McDonnell was hired to write the series. The series was greenlit in May 2024 by Crystal Dynamics and Amazon MGM Studios. Waller-Bridge wrote the series and is an executive producer alongside Jenny Robbins through Wells Street Productions. Other executive producers include Chad Hodge as co-showrunner, Michael Scheel, and from Story Kitchen, Dmitri M. Johnson, Michael Lawrence Goldberg, Timothy I. Stevenson, and Dallas Dickinson. Matt McInnis is the co-executive producer, and Jan R. Martin is a producer.

=== Casting ===
By late October 2024, Sophie Turner and Lucy Boynton were in the running for the role of Lara Croft, with Turner entering negotiation for the role the following month. She was officially confirmed in September 2025. In December, Martin Bobb-Semple, Sigourney Weaver and Jason Isaacs were cast. In January 2026, Bill Paterson, Jack Bannon, John Heffernan, Celia Imrie, Paterson Joseph, Sasha Luss, Juliette Motamed, and August Wittgenstein joined the cast.

=== Filming ===
Principal photography began on 15 January 2026, at Shinfield Studios in Berkshire, and in London. In early February 2026, Turner filmed scenes on location in a forest in Surrey, including parachuting over a lake while connected to a safety apparatus. From 13 February to 25 February, the historic Wrest Park estate in Bedfordshire was shut down to visitors for filming. On 29 March 2026, principal photography was halted for two weeks after Turner suffered minor back injuries. Filming resumed in mid-April 2026. In June 2026, filming also took place in Spain in the cities of Girona and Almería.
