= Selwyn Carrol =

American politician

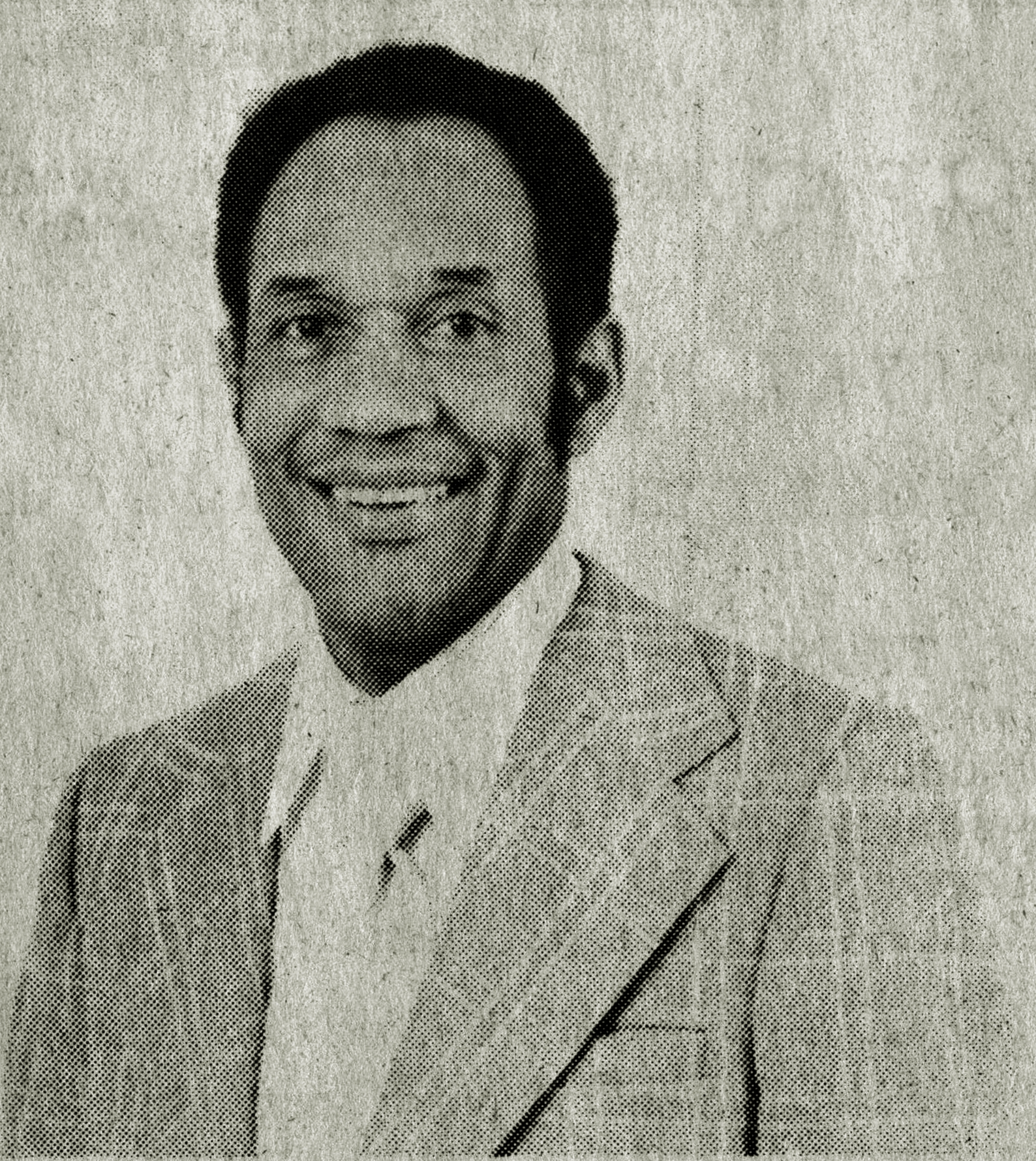
- Carrol in 1976

Member of the Alaska House of Representatives
- In office 1972–1974

Personal details
- Born: Selwyn George Carrol; October 31, 1928 Altamonte Springs, Florida, U.S.
- Died: December 21, 2010 (aged 82) Hampton County, South Carolina, U.S.
- Party: Republican

Military service
- Branch/service: United States Army
- Rank: Master Sergeant
- Battles/wars: Korean War; Vietnam War

Selwyn George Carrol (October 31, 1928 – December 21, 2010) was an American politician who served as a member of the Alaska House of Representatives from 1972 to 1974.

== Early life ==
Carrol was a native of Altamonte Springs, Florida. He was raised in Jacksonville and attended Stanton College Preparatory School. He joined the United States Army where he served in combat during the Korean War and the Vietnam War. Carrol moved to Alaska around 1958, while serving in the military.

== Career ==
He settled in Fairbanks, Alaska, in 1966, and was a social worker affiliated with the Alaska Department of Public Welfare by August 1967, before joining the Alaska Department of Corrections as a supervisor of the youth detention center in the Alaska State Jail. Carrol was hired by the Fairbanks North Star Borough School District in May 1970 as an attendance officer, and later served the district as a middle school teacher.

=== Politics ===
Carrol won the Republican Party nomination for a seat on the Alaska House of Representatives during the 1970 election cycle, but lost in the general election. He was elected a state representative in the 1972 election. Upon taking office, Carrol became the first African American member of the Alaska Legislature to be affiliated with the Republican Party. In his single term on the Alaska House of Representatives, Carrol chaired the House Community and Regional Affairs Committee and was a member of the Labor and Management Committee. Carrol sought an Alaska Senate seat in 1974, finishing first in a Republican Party primary, though he lost a close three-way race to incumbent John Butrovich. Carrol's 1976 campaign for reelection to the state house reported no deficit in September 1976. He received $8,050 in total donations during the election cycle, and spent the same amount on his campaign. Expenditures included a fine of $10, assessed by the Alaska Public Offices Commission. Carrol finished tenth of twelve total candidates for the seat.

Carrol moved to Hampton County, South Carolina, in 1977, where he remained for the rest of his life and served as county auditor. Carrol died on December 21, 2010, and was buried at the Beaufort National Cemetery in Beaufort.
