= Freddy Carter =

English actor (born 1993)

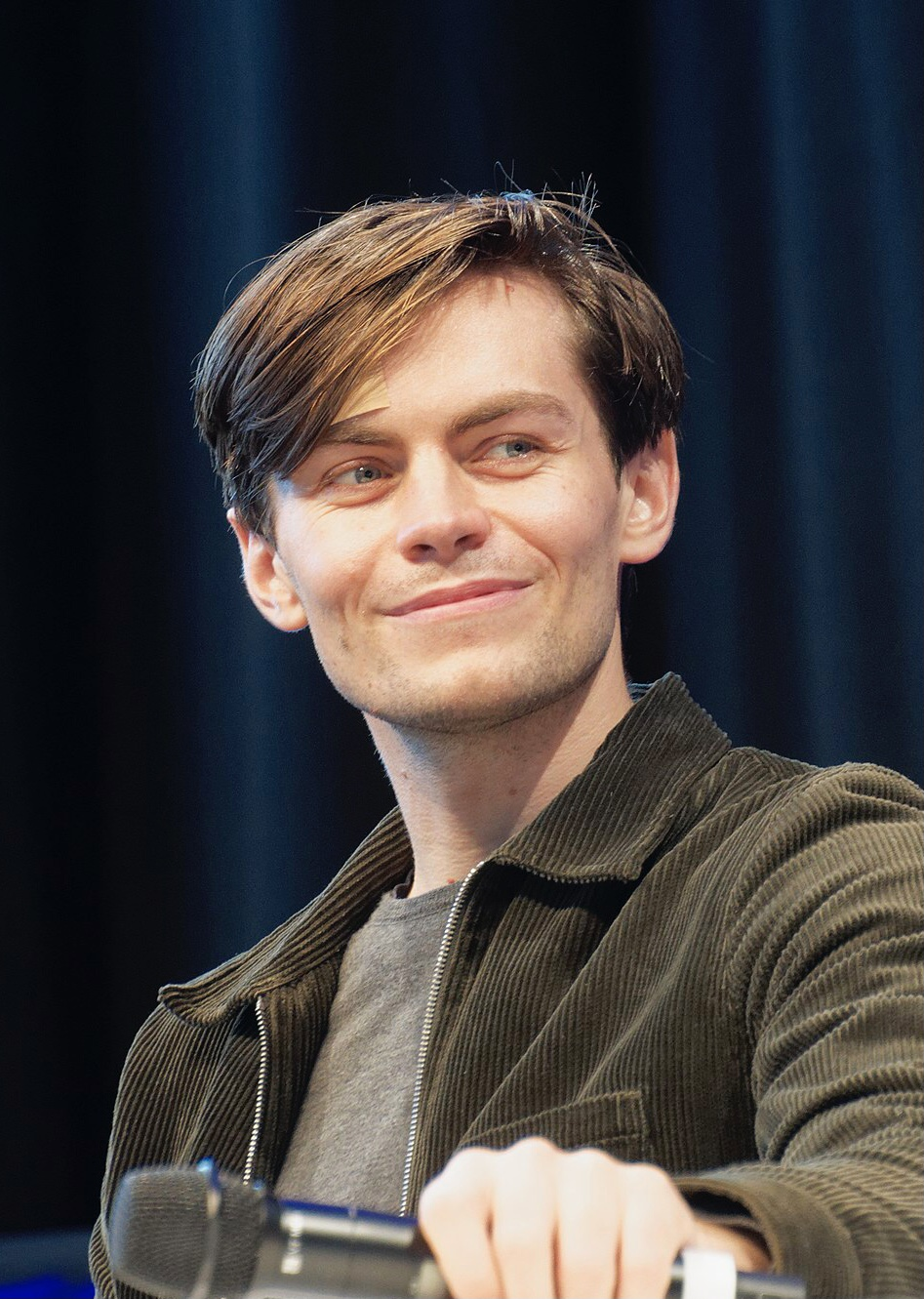
- Carter at the 2021 Comic-Con Germany in Stuttgart
- Born: Frederick James Carter; 27 January 1993 (age 33); Plymouth, England
- Education: Oxford School of Drama
- Occupation: Actor
- Years active: 2015–present
- Spouse: Caroline Ford (m. 2022)
- Children: 1
- Family: Tom Austen (brother)

Frederick James Carter (born 27 January 1993) is an English actor and director. He starred as Kaz Brekker in the Netflix fantasy series Shadow and Bone (2021–2023). He previously played Peter "Pin" Hawthorne in Free Rein (2017–2019), also on Netflix.

== Early life and education ==
Carter was born on 27 January 1993 in Plymouth, Devon, and grew up predominantly in Somerset. As his father was in the military, he spent some of his childhood moving around, with stints in Cyprus and Virginia Beach. His older brother is fellow actor Tom Austen; they also have a middle brother. The three of them went to school at Queen's College in Taunton. A production of Jerusalem starring Mark Rylance that Carter saw in London when he was 16 inspired him to pursue acting. He went on to train in acting at the Oxford School of Drama, graduating in 2015.

== Career ==
Following graduation, Carter featured in the company of the Rose Theatre Kingston production of The Wars of the Roses directed by Trevor Nunn. Carter made his onscreen debut as a soldier in the 2017 DC Comics film, Wonder Woman. That same year, Carter landed his first major role as a main character Peter "Pin" Hawthorne in the Netflix series Free Rein. He also played this role in the Christmas and Valentine's specials. He starred as Alexander Flint in the 2018 stage production of Harley Granville-Barker's Agnes Colander in the Ustinov Studio at the Theatre Royal in Bath. Carter then played Ellis in 2018 horror film The Convent.

In 2019, Carter wrote and directed his first short film, No. 89. He also had a main role as Tom in the Channel 5 miniseries 15 Days and a recurring role as Jason Ripper in the American DC Comics series Pennyworth.

In October 2019, it was announced Carter would star as Kaz Brekker in the 2021 Netflix series Shadow and Bone, an adaptation of the fantasy book series The Grisha Trilogy and the Six of Crows Duology by Leigh Bardugo. Many publications singled out the Six of Crows half of the story for further praise, including Rolling Stone, Vulture, and CNET. For the second season of Shadow and Bone, Carter was singled out for praise for his portrayal, with publications Radio Times and Rolling Stone particularly praising his scenes with Amita Suman and the Crows storyline overall. The series was cancelled by Netflix after two seasons, but fans are currently campaigning to get it back, reaching more than 200,000 signatures asking to save it.

As of 2023, Carter plays surgical student Gideon Fletcher in the Paramount+ adaptation of Elizabeth Macneal's The Doll Factory. He appeared in the Apple TV+ miniseries Masters of the Air in 2024.

Carter returned to the stage in 2025, starting opposite Arsema Thomas in Poor Clare at the Orange Tree Theatre in Richmond. That same year, Carter starred as Michael Afton, son of Matthew Lillard's William Afton and the main antagonist in Five Nights at Freddy's 2.

== Personal life ==
Carter married Caroline Ford on 3 December 2022, having met on the set of Free Rein and been in a relationship since 2018. In October 2025, the couple announced they were expecting their first child.

Carter does photography as a hobby. As of 2023, he is based in Marylebone, London.

== Filmography ==
Film
Year	Title	Role	Notes
2017	Wonder Woman	Soldier	
2018	The Convent	Ellis	
2018	Free Rein: The Twelve Neighs of Christmas	Peter "Pin" Hawthorne	Netflix film
2019	Free Rein: Valentine's Day	Peter "Pin" Hawthorne	Netflix film
2019	No. 89	—N/a	Director and writer
2022	American Carnage	Scott	
2025	Five Nights at Freddy's 2	Michael Afton	
TBA	Fortitude	Tom Miller	Post-Production

Television
Year	Title	Role	Notes
2017–2019	Free Rein	Peter "Pin" Hawthorne	Main role
2019	15 Days	Tom	Miniseries; main role
2019	Pennyworth	Jason Ripper	3 episodes
2021–2023	Shadow and Bone	Kaz Brekker	Main role
2023	The Doll Factory	Gideon Fletcher	Main role
2023	Death in Paradise	Benjamin Stableforth	Christmas special
2024	Masters of the Air	Lt. David Friedkin	Miniseries; 3 episodes
2025	Maigret	Maurice de Saint-Fiacre	2 episodes

== Stage ==
Year	Title	Role	Notes
2015	The Wars of the Roses	Company	Rose Theatre Kingston
2016	The Tempest	Ferdinand	Great Yarmouth Hippodrome, Norfolk and Norwich Festival
2018	Agnes Colander	Alexander Flint	Ustinov Studio, Theatre Royal, Bath
2025	Poor Clare	Francis	Orange Tree Theatre, Richmond

== Video games ==
Year	Title	Role	Notes
2024	Elden Ring Shadow of the Erdtree	Moore	

== Audio dramas ==
Year	Title	Role	Notes
2023	Doctor Who: Redacted	Apex Costa	
