= Stanton College Preparatory School =

Coordinates: 30.351696°N 81.672837°W

- 1149 W 13Th St; Jacksonville, Florida 32209-5699; United States

Information
- Type: Preparatory School
- Motto: "Ubuntu"
- Established: 1867
- Principal: Nongongoma Majova-Seane
- Staff: 79.00 (FTE)
- Enrollment: 1,363 (2022-23)
- Student to teacher ratio: 17.25
- Campus: Urban, 17 acres
- Colors: Royal blue █, and white █
- Mascot: Blue Devil & Phoenix
- Website: https://dcps.duvalschools.org/stanton

Stanton College Preparatory School is a public preparatory high school in Jacksonville, Florida, United States. Stanton College Preparatory School is a highly selective school that offers Advanced Placement tests and the International Baccalaureate.

The school was established in the 1860s as the Florida Institute, the first school in the state of Florida for Black students, an elementary school under the segregated education system.

Today, it serves secondary students (grades 9–12) in the Duval County Public Schools of Duval County, Florida. The school offers special curricula including Honors courses, Advanced Placement, and International Baccalaureate courses. Most Stanton students attend some form of college after graduation.

In 2005, the College Board recognized Stanton College Preparatory School as the best large high school for Advanced Placement in the world. Stanton was called "one of the premier IB and AP public schools in the country" by Jay Mathews in his 2005 book Supertest: How the International Baccalaureate Can Strengthen Our Schools. In 2014, the Washington Post ranked the school as the 4th-most-challenging high school in the Southern United States.

== History ==
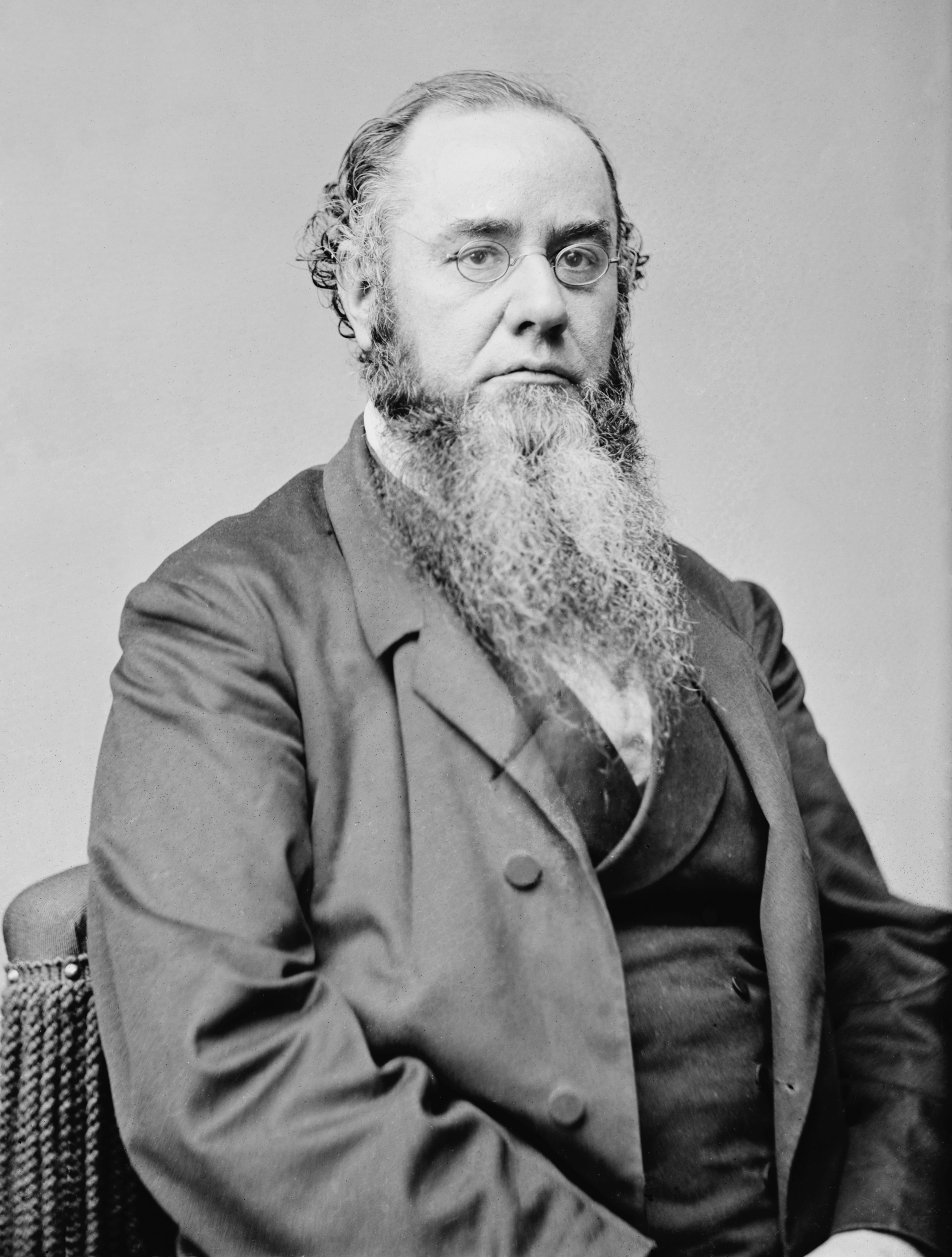
Edwin M. Stanton, namesake of the school

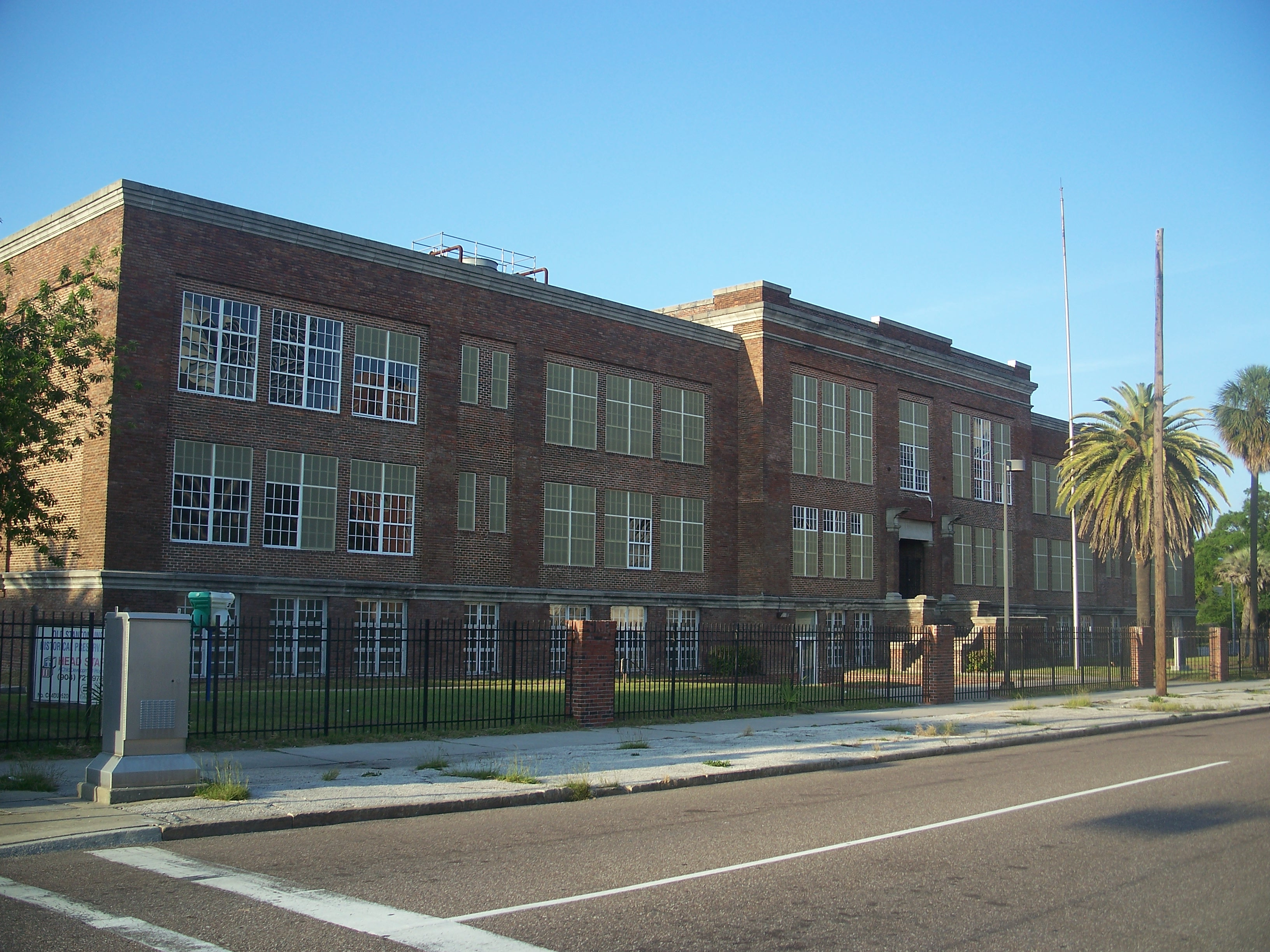
Edwin M. Stanton School

Shortly after the Civil War, a group of African Americans from Jacksonville organized the Education Society, and, in 1868, purchased the property on which the Old Stanton School was built. It was their intent to erect a school to be called the Florida Institute. Financial problems, however, delayed progress on the building until December of that year, when the school was built and incorporated through the aid of the Freedmen's Bureau. This wooden structure was named in honor of Edwin McMasters Stanton, President Abraham Lincoln's second Secretary of War. He was an ardent champion of human rights and an advocate of free school education for Negro boys and girls. It was the second school for black children in the state of Florida (the first, from 1866, was the predecessor of Edward Waters College).

The Freedmen's Bureau ran the school. Northern white teachers were employed until the county leased the property for the purpose of opening a public school. The first building was destroyed by fire in 1882. Another building constructed the same year was also destroyed by fire on May 3, 1901, a fire that destroyed much of Jacksonville. A new school was constructed in 1902 and remained in operation until 1917.

Originally the school mascot was the Blue Devil. After the school burned and was rebuilt twice, "the Phoenix rising from ashes" was adopted as a second mascot. Today both mascots are used, with the Blue Devil used as the mascot for sports and other activities, and the Phoenix used as a symbol of the school itself, along with the most current logo, a royal blue Superman "S" symbol.

On May 23, 1914, the Circuit Court of Duval County appointed nine trustees to manage the school and its property. They were Robert B. Archibald, S. H. Hart, A. L. Lewis, J. W. Floyd, W. L. Girardeau, I. L. Purcell, B. C. Vanderhorst, J. E. Spearing, and W. H. H. Styles. Archibaid and Hart resigned and were replaced by J. M. Baker and L. H. Myers.

The deteriorating and unsafe condition of the poorly constructed school building prompted the Board of Public Instruction, the Stanton School trustees, and interested citizens of Jacksonville to jointly agree to replace the wooden structure with a fire-proof building. In 1917 the building, which still stands at Ashley, Broad, Beaver, and Clay Streets, was completed. Stanton became the main focus for the education of black children in Duval County and surrounding areas. The Edwin M. Stanton School was added to the National Register of Historic Places in 1983.

An equally impressive record of academic expansion has accomplished the physical growth of Stanton. Beginning as an elementary school with six grades, under the administration of J. C. Waters as the first principal and D. W. Gulp who followed as principal, Stanton gradually became known throughout the state for the high educational standards which it still maintains today. The eighth grade was added under the leadership of Principal W. M. Artrell. Principal James Weldon Johnson, an alumnus, started the move toward a high school department.

The addition of the twelfth grade made Stanton a comprehensive school. Stanton continued as a school for all grades through the administrations of I. A. Blocker, G. M. Sampson, and J. N. Wilson. In 1938, with F. J. Anderson as principal, Stanton became a senior high school exclusively. J. L. Terry served as the last principal of Stanton Senior High School.

In 1953, the Stanton Senior School name was transferred to a new facility on 13th Street and was renamed New Stanton Senior High School. Charles D. Brooks was the first principal of the new school. Under his leadership, Stanton continued to foster the same traditionally high standards which befit its rich heritage, and flourished as the oldest and most important high school for blacks in Jacksonville.

Beginning in 1953, the Broad and Ashley Street facility became known as the "Old" Stanton. The building was used as a junior high school in 1953–1954. In August 1954, it was converted into the Stanton Vocational High School and functioned as a vocational training center, adjusting its curriculum to train and graduate African-American students in technical skills. At night, it became a center for the Adult and Veterans Education Program.

From 1969 to 1971, the focus of New Stanton Senior High School began to change from academic to vocational under the leadership of Principal Ben Durham, the former principal of Stanton Vocational High School. In 1971, the Old Stanton High School building was again placed under control of the trustees of Stanton and the student body was transferred to New Stanton Senior High School where the revised curriculum now provided for both the academic and the vocational interests of the students

In 1981, Stanton College Preparatory School became the Duval County School System's first magnet school. Beginning with grades 7–10, and adding one grade level each succeeding year, the first senior class of 54 students graduated in 1984. Stanton College Preparatory School now serves secondary students living within the 841 square miles (2,180 km^{2}) of the Duval County school district and leads the Duval County Public Schools in academic achievement.

In March 2017, the school received international criticism for verbiage on flyers hung around campus presenting both acceptable and unacceptable attire for the school prom. Students found the use of "good girl" to praise those with attire deemed appropriate to be demeaning, and took to social media with the hashtag #scpgoodgirl. The principal quickly issued an apology.

== School programs ==
=== Athletics ===
Stanton competes in the Gateway Conference, a collaboration between most public high schools in Duval County. As of the 2022–2023 school year, Stanton's athletic director is Christopher Crider. Stanton's campus has a limited number of athletic facilities due to its urban environment, but includes a football field, a rubber track, a softball field, a new batting range established the summer of 2026, and three hard surface tennis courts. Because Stanton doesn't have a baseball field, the baseball team practices at J. P. Small Memorial Stadium. Similarly, Stanton's cross country and track & field teams used to practice at Mallison Park before Stanton's rubber track was built. Its completion in 2019 made Stanton the last public high school in Duval County to upgrade to a rubber track. Stanton's sports include cross country, basketball, football, wrestling, weightlifting, flag football, soccer, track and field, swimming and diving, lacrosse, bowling, volleyball, tennis, baseball, softball, golf, and competitive cheerleading.

=== Extracurricular activities ===
Stanton offers more than 80 school clubs and organizations for students, including Multicultural Club and Devil's Advocate, the school newspaper. Its Quiz Bowl team is among the nation's best; in 2021, one of Stanton's teams placed 8th at the NAQT National Championship Tournament. The team also consistently wins the annual Duval County Quiz Bowl tournament. Stanton also offers numerous Honor Societies including Mu Alpha Theta and Psychology National Honor Society.

== Rankings ==
From 2000 to 2003, Stanton College Prep was ranked first in Newsweek magazine's list of the top 1,000 public schools in the United States, and is the only school in the nation to have been in the top 5 every year from 2000 to 2011. U.S. News & World Report ranked Stanton at ninth place on its 2008 list of America's Best High Schools. It has frequently ranked first in the US in the number of International Baccalaureate diplomas awarded. Stanton perennially leads the Jacksonville metropolitan area in the number of National Merit Scholarship recipients, and consistently ranks in the top three in the state. The school has been named a Blue Ribbon School of Excellence. As of August 2014, Stanton is rated number 12 of the top high schools in the nation by US News and number 10 by Newsweek.

== Alumni ==
- Selwyn Carrol, one-term member of the Alaska House of Representatives
- J. Dash, rapper and record producer
- Diana Eng, fashion designer and contestant on Season 2 of Project Runway
- Ned Fulmer, former YouTuber and member of the Try Guys
- Edward Gourdin, athlete and the first African-American Superior Court judge in New England (attended Stanton, but completed high school in Massachusetts)
- J. Rosamond Johnson, composer and singer, known for composing "Lift Every Voice and Sing"
- James Weldon Johnson, principal of Stanton, civil rights activist, and diplomat
- Sallye Mathis, teacher and Jacksonville city council member
- Angie Nixon, community activist and Democratic nominee for the Florida House of Representatives
- Tyler Ross, an American actor best known for playing Kyle Stansbury in season four of the television series The Killing.
- Emily Swallow, actress in the television shows including "The Mandalorian," "The Mentalist, and "Supernatural"
- Netta Walker, American actress
- Mike Waltz, former national security advisor, former U.S. Representative for Florida's 6th congressional district
- Kendal Williams, sprinter
- Russell Hainline, writer most known for the film Hot Frosty

== Notable faculty ==
- Joel Davis, former Major League Baseball pitcher; played professionally for the Chicago White Sox; baseball coach at Stanton College Preparatory School
