= The Doll Factory (TV series) =

- Based on: The Doll Factory by Elizabeth Macneal
- Written by: Charley Miles
- Directed by: Sacha Polak
- Countries of origin: United Kingdom; Ireland
- Original language: English
- No. of episodes: 6

Production
- Executive producers: Anna Burns; Elizabeth Macneal; Charley Miles; Richard Tulk-Hart; Tony Wood
- Production companies: Buccaneer Media; Shinawil

Original release
- Network: Paramount+
- Release: 27 November – 1 December 2023

The Doll Factory is a period thriller television series based on the novel of the same name by Elizabeth Macneal, adapted by Charley Miles for Paramount+. The series premiered on 27 November 2023, with all episodes released on 1 December 2023.

== Cast ==
=== Main ===
- Esmé Creed-Miles as Iris Whittle, an aspiring artist who paints dolls for a living
- Éanna Hardwicke as Silas Reed, a taxidermist who runs the Shop of Curiosities Antique and New
- Mirren Mack as Rose Whittle, a seamstress and Iris' resentful twin sister, scarred by smallpox
- George Webster as Louis Frost, Pre-Raphaelite painter
- Pippa Haywood as Mrs Salter, who runs Mrs Salter's Doll Emporium
- Sharlene Whyte as Madame
- Reece Kenwyne-Mpudzi as Albie, street child who works for Silas
- Saoirse-Monica Jackson as Bluebell, a sex worker
- Laurie Kynaston as Millais, Pre-Raphaelite founder
- Jim Caesar as Hunt, Pre-Raphaelite founder
- Akshay Khanna as Rossetti, Pre-Raphaelite founder
- Freddy Carter as Gideon Fletcher, surgical student

=== Supporting ===
- Nell Hudson as Clarissa Frost, Louis' sister
- Aysha Kala as Ananya
- Liadán Dunlea as Flick, a past love of Silas'
- Hannah Onslow as Lizzie Siddal, Pre-Raphaelite model
- Nia Deacon as Evie, Albie's sister
- Alexandra Dowling as Sylvia, Louis' wife
- Mali Harries as Moll
- Charlotte Bate as Kathleen
- Shane Lennon as Charles

== Episodes ==
No.	Title	Directed by	Written by	Original release date
1	"Episode 1"	Sacha Polak	Unknown	November 27, 2023
2	"Episode 2"	Sacha Polak	Unknown	November 27, 2023
3	"Episode 3"	Sacha Polak	Unknown	November 28, 2023
4	"Episode 4"	Unknown	Unknown	November 29, 2023
5	"Episode 5"	Unknown	Unknown	November 30, 2023
6	"Episode 6"	Unknown	Unknown	December 1, 2023

== Production ==
In July 2022, it was announced the UK and Ireland wing of Paramount+ had commissioned a six-part adaptation of Macneal's novel from Buccaneer Media, with Shinawil handling local production in Ireland. Charley Miles would adapt the novel, and Sacha Polak would direct the series.

The cast was announced in November 2022, with Esmé Creed-Miles set to lead the series alongside Éanna Hardwicke, Mirren Mack, and George Webster. Also joining the series were Pippa Haywood, Sharlene Whyte, Reece Kenwyne-Mpudzi, Freddy Carter, Saoirse-Monica Jackson, Laurie Kynaston, Jim Caesar, Akshay Khanna, Aysha Kala, and Nell Hudson.

Principal photography was under way in and around Dublin as of November 2022. Filming was reported at Trinity College Dublin in January 2023, specifically in the Museum Building and the Physics Lecture Theatre.
