= Asylum (2014 film) =

- Directed by: Todor Chapkanov
- Screenplay by: Chris Mancini; Tex Wall
- Produced by: Moshe Diamant; Suvo Evtimov; Bobby Ranghelov
- Starring: Stephen Rea; Bruce Payne; Hristo Shopov; Caroline Ford
- Cinematography: Lorenzo Senatore
- Production company: After Dark Films
- Release dates: April 4, 2014 (Japan); June 2, 2015
- Running time: 93 minutes
- Country: United States
- Language: English

Asylum is a 2014 American horror comedy film directed by Todor Chapkanov and starring Stephen Rea, Bruce Payne, Hristo Shopov, and Caroline Ford. The film was released to DVD in Japan on April 4, 2014, and was released in the United States on June 2, 2015. Asylum is part of After Dark's "After Dark Originals" series and stars Stephen Rea as a man who must stop his brother from releasing the forces of darkness upon the world.

== Plot ==
The film follows a riot squad that enters an insane asylum to try to deal with a hostage situation involving some of the inmates. The group is quickly overwhelmed by the patients, who quickly attack the squad members. The resulting chaos causes the group to lose two of their members and the situation turns more tense when they realize that they are completely cut off from the outside world. Not only are all of the doors locked, but none of their communication devices seem to work properly. It is at this point that they realize that they aren't fighting against normal mental patients, but ones that have been possessed by a dark and evil force. Things take a darker turn when one group member discovers that the leader of this group is his own brother.

== Cast ==
- Stephen Rea as McGahey
- Bruce Payne as Lieutenant Sharp
- Hristo Shopov as Father Richard
- Caroline Ford as Halloway
- Steve Toussaint as Sergeant Powell
- Jason Wong as Lim
- Valentin Ganev as Priest
- Joe Montana as Barnett
- Dimo Alexiev as Tall Intense Patient
- Anton Trendafilov as Deep Voice Man
- Velimer Velev as Bald Patient
- Radoslav Ignatov as Wilder
- Ulyana Chan as Attractive Nurse
- Stefan Shyerev as Marduk
- Iana Kuzova as Dimarino
- Curtis Nordstrom as Gilmartin
- Edward Joe Scargill as Phillips

== Production ==
The film's script was written by horror writer and director Chris Mancini, who pitched Asylum to After Dark. Mancini intended to serve as the movie's director, only for After Dark to instead assign Chapkanov as the movie's director and move the film's production to Bulgaria. Mancini's script was heavily re-written and altered from its original state and according to some review websites such as DVD Verdict and HorrorNews.net, After Dark enlisted Mancini to insert comedy into the film in an effort to salvage the production due to them seeing Chapkanov's finished film as poor in quality.

== Reception ==
Influx Magazine panned Asylum, writing that ""It’s ultimately a rather weak affair (and really difficult to grade knowing the average viewer walking into this coldly will have an entirely different take on the result), but despite the best efforts of Mancini and friends to salvage this mess, I think the patient is lost and they should have just pulled the plug." HorrorNews.net criticized the film as being "a mess, from the moment the film starts, you can see it and feel it".
