= Netta Walker =

American actress

- Born: August 22, 1996 (age 30); Jacksonville, Florida
- Occupations: Actress; Playwright; Poet
- Years active: 2019–present

Netta Walker is an American actress and playwright. She is best known for playing Keisha McCalla in the sports drama series All American as well as its spinoff series All American: Homecoming. As a writer her play keerah premieres at Defintion Theater Company in June 2026, and her play Hayward premieres with The Gift Theatre Company at Steppenwolf Theatre in October 2026.

== Early life ==
Walker was born in Jacksonville, Florida to a Filipino mother and African-American father. They met in the Philippines when her father was serving in the navy. She has three older brothers. She attended two historically black institutions, James Weldon Johnson Middle School and Stanton College Preparatory School. She was inspired to become an actress thanks to her high school theatre teacher Shirley Sacks Kirby who saw her potential.

== Career ==
While studying in Roosevelt University in Chicago before dropping out, she went on to perform in numerous plays such as portraying Ophelia in Hamlet with The Gift Theatre, Continuity by Bess Wohl at The Goodman Theatre, Great Expectations at Remy Bumppo and many more. In 2019 she received a Joseph Jefferson Award for Best Supporting Actor for her performance in the Raven Theater's production of Yen. Her first big TV role came playing Keisha McCalla in the sports series All American. Her biggest role so far has been playing the same character in the spinoff series All American: Homecoming. As a writer her play keerah premiers at Defintion Theater Company June 2026, and her play Hayward premiers with The Gift Theatre Company at Steppenwolf Theatre in October 2026. She hopes in the future to act in a romance film as well as to have an opportunity to play a villain that audiences will find hard to dislike.

== Personal life ==
Walker is passionate about her Philippine roots. She visited the country for the first time when she was 16 to celebrate her deceased grandmother's birthday--a tradition in Filipino culture.

== Filmography ==
=== Film ===
Year	Title	Role	Notes
2019	Come as You Are	Claire	
2023	Whole	Mischa	Short
2025	Behind the Eight Ball	Nadia	

=== Television ===
Year	Title	Role	Notes
2020	Chicago Fire	Shelby	Episode; Off the Grid
2021	The Big Leap	Keisia	Episode; I Want You Back
2021-2022	All American	Keisha McCalla	2 episodes
2022-2024	All American: Homecoming	Keisha McCalla	33 episodes
2025	The Chi	Melanie	Episode; Rebirth
