= All American: Homecoming =

2022 American sports drama television series

- Genre: Sports drama
- Created by: Nkechi Okoro Carroll
- Starring: Geffri Maya; Peyton Alex Smith; Kelly Jenrette; Cory Hardrict; Sylvester Powell; Camille Hyde; Mitchell Edwards; Netta Walker; Rhoyle Ivy King; Martin Bobb-Semple
- Music by: Blake Neely
- Country of origin: United States
- Original language: English
- No. of seasons: 3
- No. of episodes: 41

Production
- Executive producers: David Madden; Robbie Rogers; Sarah Schechter; Greg Berlanti; Nkechi Okoro Carroll; Lindsay Dunn; Marqui Jackson
- Producers: Jon Wallace; Carl Ogawa; Jennifer Lence; Jonathan Gabay; Ed Tapia; Cam'ron Moore; Alison McKenzie; Ronald D. Chong
- Cinematography: Hans Charles; David A. Harp
- Editors: Finnian Murray; Alexander Aquino-Kaljakin; Stephanie Neroes; Jennifer Hoks; Jessie Murray; Kathleen E. McAuley; Erin Druez; Angela Latimer
- Running time: 42 minutes
- Production companies: Berlanti Productions; Rock My Soul Productions; CBS Studios; Warner Bros. Television

Original release
- Network: The CW
- Release: February 21, 2022 – September 30, 2024

Related
- All American

All American: Homecoming is an American sports drama television series, spin-off of All American, created by Nkechi Okoro Carroll which premiered on The CW on February 21, 2022 and features an ensemble cast starring Geffri Maya in the lead role as well as Peyton Alex Smith, Kelly Jenrette, Cory Hardrict, Sylvester Powell, Camille Hyde, Mitchell Edwards, Netta Walker, Rhoyle Ivy King and Martin Bobb-Semple.

The series is set on the backdrop of the HBCU experience and follows a group of young adults as they navigate their college years.

In June 2024, the series was canceled ahead of its third season premiere and concluded on September 30, 2024, after 41 episodes spanning three seasons.

== Plot ==
In this All American spin-off, Simone Hicks leaves behind her boyfriend Jordan in Los Angeles and attends Bringston University, a historically Black college in Atlanta where she decides to pursue her dreams of being a pro tennis player. Also attending the school is Damon Sims, a fellow freshman who is navigating the college scene to pursue his dream of playing baseball for the university after rejecting an MLB draft to continue to play baseball for Bringston under the guidance of his coach, Marcus Turner. Also included is Amara Patterson, Simone's aunt, who teaches journalism at Bringston.

== Cast and characters ==
=== Main ===
- Geffri Maya as Simone Hicks
- Peyton Alex Smith as Damon Sims (seasons 1–2; guest season 3), a talented baseball player who decides to enroll at Bringston University and play for its team instead of going pro right after graduating from high school
- Kelly Jenrette as Amara Patterson (seasons 1–2; recurring season 3), current executive president at Bringston University where she was formerly a journalism professor
- Cory Hardrict as Coach Marcus Turner, the baseball head coach of Bringston University at the beginning of the series who once was a professional player before having to retire
- Sylvester Powell as Jessie "JR" Raymond, Damon's long-time friend and biological brother
- Camille Hyde as Thea Mays, a talented tennis player and the captain of Bringston's tennis team
- Mitchell Edwards as Cameron "Cam" Watkins, a student at Bringston University where he serves as executive president's office secretary
- Netta Walker as Keisha McCalla, a student at Bringston University and daughter of its former president who becomes friends with Simone
- Rhoyle Ivy King as Nathaniel "Nate" Hardin (seasons 2–3; recurring season 1), Simone and Keisha's non-binary, gender-fluid friend
- Martin Bobb-Semple as Orlando "Lando" Johnson (season 3; recurring season 2; guest season 1), a talented baseball player who transfers to Bringston University and becomes Damon's rival

=== Recurring ===
- John Marshall Jones as Leonard Shaw (seasons 1–2), the former baseball head coach at Bringston University
- Tamberla Perry as Keena Sims (season 1), Damon’s adoptive mother
- Leonard Roberts as Zeke Allen (seasons 1–2), Keisha's father and former executive president at Bringston University
- Derek Rivera as Santiago Reyes, a student at Bringston University and player of its baseball team
- Sabrina Revelle as Coach Elaine Loni, Bringston University's tennis head coach
- Robert Bailey Jr. as Ralph Wells (seasons 1–2), a Bringston University alum
- Iyana Halley as Wilinda (seasons 1–2), a student at Bringston University who helps Nate with their campaign during the run for president of the Student Council
- Joe Holt as Jessie, JR's father and Damon's biological father
- Crystal Lee Brown as Celine (seasons 1–2), JR's mother and Damon's biological mother
- Shelli Boone as Tina Hicks, Simone's mother
- Heather Lynn Harris as Gabrielle, an engineering student at Bringston University who becomes JR's girlfriend
- Renee Harrison as Aqueelah (seasons 1–2), a student at Bringston University and member of the PKZ sorority
- Jamad Mays as Rome (season 2), a Brinston University alum
- Diahnna Nicole Baxter as Dr. Pace (season 2), Keisha’s dance professor at Bringston University
- Taylor Polidore as Tootie (seasons 2–3), a member of Bringston University tennis team
- Blake Brewer as Nico Logan (season 2), Nate’s ex-boyfriend and president of the Student Council at Bringston University before being replaced by Nate themselves
- Alana Kay Bright as Melody (season 2), a student at Bringston University and member of the PKZ sorority
- Jaalen Best (season 2) and Kyler Pettis (season 3) as Ryan Craig, a journalism student at Bringston University who becomes Nate’s boyfriend
- Mychala Lee as Eva (season 3), Lando’s new girlfriend who is also a member of the PKZ sorority
- Cameron Elie as Noah (season 3), Marcus' 14-year-old son whom he recently learned he had

=== Special guest stars ===
- Michael Evans Behling as Jordan Baker (seasons 1–2)
- Daniel Ezra as Spencer James (season 2)
- Reggie Bush as himself (season 2)

=== Notable guest stars ===
- Greta Onieogou as Layla Keating (season 2)
- Coco Gauff as herself (season 2)

== Episodes ==
=== Series overview ===
Season	Episodes	Originally released	
Season	Episodes	First released	Last released
Backdoor pilot		July 5, 2021	
1	13	February 21, 2022	May 23, 2022
2	15	October 10, 2022	March 27, 2023
3	13	July 8, 2024	September 30, 2024

=== Backdoor pilot (2021) ===
No. overall	No. in season	Title	Directed by	Written by	Original release date	Prod. code	U.S. viewers (millions)
49	17	"All American: Homecoming"	Michael Schultz	Nkechi Okoro Carroll	July 5, 2021	T13.22516	0.58

=== Season 1 (2022) ===
No. overall	No. in season	Title	Directed by	Written by	Original release date	Prod. code	U.S. viewers (millions)
1	1	"Start Over"	Michael Schultz	Nkechi Okoro Carroll	February 21, 2022	T13.23501	0.47
2	2	"Under Pressure"	Kelli Williams	Marqui Jackson	February 28, 2022	T13.23502	0.40
3	3	"Love and War"	Sheelin Choksey	Cam'ron Moore	March 7, 2022	T13.23503	0.41
4	4	"If Only You Knew"	Oz Scott	Alison McKenzie	March 14, 2022	T13.23504	0.44
5	5	"Truth Hurts"	Michael Schultz	Hollie Overton	March 21, 2022	T13.23505	0.42
6	6	"Family Affair"	Ryan Zaragoza	Jeffrey David Thomas	March 28, 2022	T13.23506	0.38
7	7	"Godspeed"	David McWhirter	Charia Rose	April 11, 2022	T13.23507	0.33
8	8	"Just a Friend"	Dawn Wilkinson	Megan McNamara	April 18, 2022	T13.23508	0.30
9	9	"Ordinary People"	Christine Swanson	Cam'ron Moore & Alison McKenzie	April 25, 2022	T13.23509	0.38
10	10	"Move On"	Eric Dean Seaton	Hollie Overton	May 2, 2022	T13.23510	0.34
11	11	"What Now?"	Nikhil Paniz	Jeffrey David Thomas & Charia Rose	May 9, 2022	T13.23511	0.31
12	12	"Confessions"	Benny Boom	Marqui Jackson	May 16, 2022	T13.23512	0.40
13	13	"Irreplaceable"	Christine Swanson	Nkechi Okoro Carroll & Megan McNamara	May 23, 2022	T13.23513	0.48

=== Season 2 (2022–23) ===
No. overall	No. in season	Title	Directed by	Written by	Original release date	Prod. code	U.S. viewers (millions)
14	1	"We Need a Resolution"	Michael Schultz	Nkechi Okoro Carroll	October 10, 2022	T13.24201	0.35
15	2	"No Love"	Ryan Zaragoza	Cam'ron Moore	October 17, 2022	T13.24202	0.27
16	3	"Me, Myself & I"	Christine Swanson	Alison McKenzie	October 24, 2022	T13.24203	0.40
17	4	"We Shall Not Be Moved"	David McWhirter	Marqui Jackson	November 7, 2022	T13.24204	0.36
18	5	"No More Drama"	Nikhil Paniz	Lamont Magee	November 14, 2022	T13.24205	0.41
19	6	"Free Your Mind"	Keesha Sharp	Charia Rose & Megan McNamara	November 21, 2022	T13.24206	0.33
20	7	"Integrity"	Steve Acevedo	Hollie Overton	November 28, 2022	T13.24207	0.31
21	8	"Rock the Boat"	Christine Swanson	Cam'ron Moore & Jeffrey David Thomas	January 23, 2023	T13.24208	0.33
22	9	"Hard Place"	Michael Schultz	Alison McKenzie & Christopher N. Corte	January 30, 2023	T13.24209	0.39
23	10	"Dance with My Father"	Leon Lozano	Marqui Jackson & Lamont Magee	February 6, 2023	T13.24210	0.38
24	11	"I Can Tell"	Charissa Sanjarernsuithikul	Megan McNamara	February 13, 2023	T13.24211	0.40
25	12	"Behind the Mask"	Sylvain White	Jeffrey David Thomas	February 20, 2023	T13.24212	0.44
26	13	"Lose to Win"	Avi Youabian	Charia Rose	March 13, 2023	T13.24213	0.41
27	14	"Stand Up for Something"	David Ramsey	Hollie Overton	March 20, 2023	T13.24214	0.36
28	15	"Diary"	Ryan Zaragoza	Marqui Jackson	March 27, 2023	T13.24215	0.36

=== Season 3 (2024) ===
No. overall	No. in season	Title	Directed by	Written by	Original release date	Prod. code	U.S. viewers (millions)
29	1	"Ready or Not"	Nikhil Paniz	Nkechi Okoro Carroll	July 8, 2024	T13.24301	0.27
30	2	"Level Up"	Nikhil Paniz	Alison McKenzie	July 15, 2024	T13.24302	0.30
31	3	"Right My Wrongs"	Avi Youabian	Megan McNamara	July 22, 2024	T13.24303	0.32
32	4	"Control"	Avi Youabian	Charia Rose	July 29, 2024	T13.24304	0.28
33	5	"Before I Let Go"	Charissa Sanjarernsuithikul	Cam'ron Moore	August 5, 2024	T13.24305	0.30
34	6	"New Normal"	Charissa Sanjarernsuithikul	Hollie Overton	August 12, 2024	T13.24306	0.31
35	7	"Lift Me Up"	Eric Dean Seaton	Alison McKenzie	August 19, 2024	T13.24307	0.26
36	8	"Have You Seen Her"	Eric Dean Seaton	Marqui Jackson	August 26, 2024	T13.24308	0.32
37	9	"Pain Is Inevitable"	Jes Macallan	Megan McNamara & Charia Rose	September 2, 2024	T13.24309	0.21
38	10	"Un-Break My Heart"	Jes Macallan	Christopher N. Corte	September 9, 2024	T13.24310	0.25
39	11	"After the Love Has Gone"	David McWhirter	Cam'ron Moore	September 16, 2024	T13.24311	0.26
40	12	"I Stand Alone"	David McWhirter	Hollie Overton	September 23, 2024	T13.24312	0.28
41	13	"Survivor"	Michael Schultz	Marqui Jackson	September 30, 2024	T13.24313	0.28

== Production ==
=== Development ===
On December 18, 2020, it was announced that a backdoor pilot for an All American spin-off centered on the character Simone Hicks was in early development at The CW, with Geffri Maya, who portrayed Simone, reprising her role. On February 1, 2021, The CW gave the spin-off a pilot order and titled it as All American: Homecoming. On May 24, 2021, All American: Homecoming was picked up to series with Nkechi Okoro Carroll serving both as creator and executive producer, the latter alongside Greg Berlanti, Sarah Schechter, David Madden, and Robbie Rogers. The production companies involved with the series are Berlanti Productions and Warner Bros. Television. The backdoor pilot, written by Carroll and directed by Michael Schultz, aired on July 5, 2021 as part of the third season of All American. On May 12, 2022, The CW renewed the series for a second season. On June 12, 2023, The CW renewed the series for a third season after reaching an agreement with Warner Bros. Television to reduce its budget. On February 15, 2024, Brad Schwartz, The CW President of Entertainment, stated that the third season would consist of 13 episodes. On June 5, 2024, The CW canceled the series after three seasons, with Deadline Hollywood reporting that demands by The CW for lower licensing fees, low number of overall viewers and Warner Bros. TV's deal with Netflix for the show not including funding for a fourth season, proved as impediments in its renewal.

=== Casting ===
On March 29, 2021, it was reported that Peyton Alex Smith, Cory Hardrict, Kelly Jenrette, Sylvester Powell, Netta Walker and Camille Hyde were cast to star in the series. On December 16, 2021, it was announced that Mitchell Edwards, who portrayed recurring character Cam Watkins on All American, was set to reprise his role in the spin-off as a series regular, while Rhoyle Ivy King was cast in a recurring capacity. On January 28, 2022, it was reported that Tamberla Perry had joined the cast in a recurring role. On June 21, 2022, Rhoyle Ivy King was promoted to series regular for the second season. On July 6, 2023, it was announced that Peyton Alex Smith and Kelly Jenrette had been cut as series regulars ahead of the third season as part of budget cuts, with Jenrette being demoted to recurring status. On February 14, 2024, it was announced that Martin Bobb-Semple had been promoted to series regular for the third season. On June 24, 2024, it was reported that Cameron Elie had joined the cast in a recurring capacity for the third season.

== Release ==
=== Broadcast ===
All American: Homecoming premiered on The CW on February 21, 2022. The second season premiered on October 10, 2022. The third and final season premiered on July 8, 2024.

=== Streaming ===
The first season of All American: Homecoming was added to Netflix in the United States on July 12, 2022. The second season is available to stream on Netflix starting on April 11, 2023. The third and final season is available to stream on Netflix starting on October 15, 2024.

== Reception ==
=== Season 1 ===
Viewership and ratings per episode of All American: Homecoming
No.	Title	Air date	Rating (18–49)	Viewers (millions)	DVR (18–49)	DVR viewers (millions)	Total (18–49)	Total viewers (millions)
1	"Start Over"	February 21, 2022	0.1	0.47	—N/a	—N/a	—N/a	—N/a
2	"Under Pressure"	February 28, 2022	0.1	0.40	—N/a	—N/a	—N/a	—N/a
3	"Love and War"	March 7, 2022	0.1	0.41	0.1	0.29	0.2	0.70
4	"If Only You Knew"	March 14, 2022	0.1	0.44	0.1	0.25	0.2	0.69
5	"Truth Hurts"	March 21, 2022	0.1	0.42	0.1	0.26	0.2	0.68
6	"Family Affair"	March 28, 2022	0.1	0.38	0.1	0.27	0.2	0.66
7	"Godspeed"	April 11, 2022	0.1	0.33	0.1	0.26	0.2	0.59
8	"Just a Friend"	April 18, 2022	0.1	0.30	0.1	0.26	0.2	0.56
9	"Ordinary People"	April 25, 2022	0.1	0.38	0.1	0.28	0.2	0.66
10	"Move On"	May 2, 2022	0.1	0.34	—N/a	—N/a	—N/a	—N/a
11	"What Now?"	May 9, 2022	0.1	0.31	—N/a	—N/a	—N/a	—N/a
12	"Confessions"	May 16, 2022	0.1	0.40	—N/a	—N/a	—N/a	—N/a
13	"Irreplaceable"	May 23, 2022	0.1	0.48	—N/a	—N/a	—N/a	—N/a

=== Season 2 ===
Viewership and ratings per episode of All American: Homecoming
No.	Title	Air date	Rating (18–49)	Viewers (millions)	DVR (18–49)	DVR viewers (millions)	Total (18–49)	Total viewers (millions)
1	"We Need a Resolution"	October 10, 2022	0.1	0.35	0.1	0.28	0.2	0.63
2	"No Love"	October 17, 2022	0.1	0.27	0.1	0.29	0.2	0.55
3	"Me, Myself & I"	October 24, 2022	0.1	0.40	0.1	0.22	0.2	0.62
4	"We Shall Not Be Moved"	November 7, 2022	0.1	0.36	0.1	0.26	0.2	0.62
5	"No More Drama"	November 14, 2022	0.1	0.41	0.1	0.29	0.2	0.70
6	"Free Your Mind"	November 21, 2022	0.1	0.33	—N/a	—N/a	—N/a	—N/a
7	"Integrity"	November 28, 2022	0.1	0.31	—N/a	—N/a	—N/a	—N/a
8	"Rock the Boat"	January 23, 2023	0.1	0.33	—N/a	—N/a	—N/a	—N/a
9	"Hard Place"	January 30, 2023	0.1	0.39	—N/a	—N/a	—N/a	—N/a
10	"Dance with My Father"	February 6, 2023	0.1	0.38	—N/a	—N/a	—N/a	—N/a
11	"I Can Tell"	February 13, 2023	0.1	0.40	—N/a	—N/a	—N/a	—N/a
12	"Behind the Mask"	February 20, 2023	0.1	0.44	—N/a	—N/a	—N/a	—N/a
13	"Lose to Win"	March 13, 2023	0.1	0.41	—N/a	—N/a	—N/a	—N/a
14	"Stand Up for Something"	March 20, 2023	0.1	0.36	—N/a	—N/a	—N/a	—N/a
15	"Diary"	March 27, 2023	0.1	0.36	—N/a	—N/a	—N/a	—N/a

=== Season 3 ===
Viewership and ratings per episode of All American: Homecoming
No.	Title	Air date	Rating (18–49)	Viewers (millions)
1	"Ready or Not"	July 8, 2024	0.1	0.27
2	"Level Up"	July 15, 2024	0.1	0.30
3	"Right My Wrongs"	July 22, 2024	0.1	0.32
4	"Control"	July 29, 2024	0.1	0.28
5	"Before I Let Go"	August 5, 2024	0.1	0.30
6	"New Normal"	August 12, 2024	0.0	0.31
7	"Lift Me Up"	August 19, 2024	0.1	0.26
8	"Have You Seen Her"	August 26, 2024	0.1	0.32
9	"Pain Is Inevitable"	September 2, 2024	0.1	0.21
10	"Un-Break My Heart"	September 9, 2024	0.0	0.25
11	"After the Love Has Gone"	September 16, 2024	0.0	0.26
12	"I Stand Alone"	September 23, 2024	0.0	0.28
13	"Survivor"	September 30, 2024	0.1	0.28
