= EECC =

- East European Comic Con
- European Electronic Communications Code
