= Caroline Ford (actress) =

English actress

- Born: Caroline Mary Ford; 13 May 1988 (age 38); Chorleywood, Hertfordshire, England
- Education: St Andrews University; (MA)
- Occupation: Actress
- Years active: 2010–present
- Spouse: Freddy Carter (m. 2022)
- Children: 1

Caroline Mary Ford (born 13 May 1988) is an English actress. She is known for her roles as Sam in the Netflix series Free Rein (2017) and Sophie Longerbane in the Amazon Prime series Carnival Row (2019–2023).

== Early life ==
Ford took classes at the Carol Kristian Theatre School. She went on to graduate with a Scottish Master of Arts in History of Art from St Andrews University. Ford also pursued modeling, signing up to the Stolen agency in Edinburgh.

== Career ==
In 2010, Ford made her professional television debut in the BBC medical drama Casualty. The following year, she appeared in a number of short films including Nick Rowland's Fair Belles and Eitan Arrusi's The Crypt. Her others credits include some independent films, such as Don Michael Paul's Lake Placid: The Final Chapter, Simon Blake's Still, and as Maxine in The Callback Queen (2013). In 2014, she was cast as Peshet in the Fox adventure series Hieroglyph. However, the series was cancelled before airing. The same year, Ford made a guest appearance in Sleepy Hollows second series as Lilith, before being cast as Spindle in Travis Beacham's 2015 short film The Curiosity.

Ford then appeared in the 2015 film Anti-Social as Rochelle, alongside Meghan Markle. In 2017, Ford played Sam in the first series of the Netflix children's series Free Rein, before landing the role of Sophie Longerbane in the Prime series Carnival Row. The second and final season was released in 2023.

== Personal life ==
Ford married Freddy Carter on 3 December 2022, having met on the set of Free Rein and been in a relationship since 2018. In October 2025, the couple announced they were expecting their first child.

== Filmography ==
=== Film ===
Year	Title	Role	Notes
2010	The Storm		Short film
2011	Fair Belles	Adelita	Short film
2013	The Callback Queen	Maxine	
2014	Asylum	Halloway	Short film
2014	Still	Sussanna	Short film
2015	Anti-Social	Rochelle	
2016	The Curiosity	Spindle	Short film
2017	Crypt	Lanya	Short film
2018	Nekrotronic	Molly	

=== Television ===
Year	Title	Role	Notes
2010	Casualty	Miriam Cresswell	Episode: "Reasons Unknown"
2012	Lake Placid: The Final Chapter	Elaine	Television film
2014	Sleepy Hollow	Lilith	Episode: "Heartless"
2014	Hieroglyph	Peshet	Main role
2015	Once Upon a Time	Nimue	Recurring role; 3 episodes
2017	Free Rein	Sam	Main role; 10 episodes
2018 - 2023	Carnival Row	Sophie Longerbane	Main role - 10 episodes
2023	Captain Laserhawk: A Blood Dragon Remix	The Warden	Voice role; post-production
