= Hieroglyph (TV series) =

- Genre: Drama; Fantasy; Action-adventure
- Created by: Travis Beacham
- Starring: Max Brown; Reece Ritchie; Condola Rashad; John Rhys-Davies; Caroline Ford; Antony Bunsee; Kelsey Chow
- Country of origin: United States
- Original language: English

Production
- Executive producers: Travis Beacham; Peter Chernin; Katherine Pope; Anna Fricke; Miguel Sapochnik
- Production companies: 20th Century Fox Television; Chernin Entertainment

Original release
- Network: Fox

Hieroglyph was a proposed American action-adventure drama series created by Travis Beacham, who served as executive producer on the show along with Katherine Pope, Peter Chernin and Miguel Sapochnik. Sapochnik directed the first episode. The series was produced by 20th Century Fox Television and Chernin Entertainment. Originally scheduled for a spring 2015 premiere, it was announced at the end of June 2014 that Fox had shut down production and canceled the series before airing an episode.

== Cast ==
- Max Brown as Ambrose
- Reece Ritchie as Pharaoh Shai Kanakht
- Condola Rashad as Nefertari Kanakht, the Pharaoh's half-sister
- John Rhys-Davies as Vocifer
- Caroline Ford as Peshet
- Antony Bunsee as Rawser
- Kelsey Chow as Lotus Tenry
- Hal Ozsan as Bek Penroy

== Development ==
On October 17, 2013, Fox announced that it had dropped the pilot stage for Hieroglyph and would straight away commit to a 13-episode season. The first episode was shot in Morocco in early 2014. The series was expected to continue filming in March 2014 in New Mexico at the Albuquerque Studios. Kevin Reilly for Fox Entertainment has stated that "We wanted to do a show about deceit, sex, intrigue in the court and fantastical goings on – no better place to set that than ancient Egypt."

Fox canceled the series in June 2014, saying the series was not coming together the way executives had hoped.
