= Rhoyle Ivy King =

American Actor

- Born: January 16, 1996 (age 30)
- Occupations: Actor; Model
- Notable work: All American: Homecoming

Rhoyle Ivy King (born January 16, 1996) is an American actor, best known for their role on All American: Homecoming portraying Nathaniel Hardin the first Black nonbinary character to be included in a CW show.

== Early life ==
King was born in Fort Worth, Texas. They grew up in Houston in a house with several Black women relatives, who influenced their gender expression. King's mother is a nurse who studied at Prairie View A&M University, a historically Black college and university. At age 9, King's family moved to Kansas City, Missouri, where King participated in a Shakespeare camp that inspired them to pursue acting.

== Career ==
=== Acting ===
King studied musical theater at the American Musical and Dramatic Academy in New York City. In 2019, King played Angel Dumott Schunard in RENT at the Redhouse Art Center. King was cast in the ensemble for a national tour of FAME: The Musical!. In 2019, King was hired as a day player on Pose, a show about a Black queer community, which inspired King to keep pursuing art as a Black androgynous person. In 2022, Ryan Murphy hired King for Monster: The Jeffrey Dahmer Story.

In 2022, King impressed Nkechi Okoro Carroll with their All American: Homecoming audition. This inspired her to expand their role from a minor character into a main character. TVLine named King's character on the show as the first of "10 LGBTQ+ Characters Who Proudly Made Waves on TV in 2022" and GLAAD dubbed the show, "Must-See LGBTQ TV".

=== Modeling ===
King models for Beyoncé's clothing line, Ivy Park. In 2022, they were featured in Sheen Magazine. They have been featured on the cover of Ouch! Magazine and Jejune Magazine.
