= Martin Bobb-Semple =

English actor (born 1997)

- Born: 29 August 1997 (age 28); London, England
- Education: Identity School of Acting
- Occupation: Actor
- Years active: 2009–present

Martin Bobb-Semple (born 29 August 1997) is an English actor. After making his debut as a child actor in a West End theatre production of Oliver! in 2009, he appeared in various children's television series including Dixi (2014), So Awkward (2016) and Free Rein (2018–2019). Bobb-Semple has since gone on to star in series including Pandora (2019), One of Us Is Lying (2021–2022) and All American: Homecoming (2022–2024).

== Life and career ==
Bobb-Semple was born on 29 August 1997 and grew up in North West London alongside an older brother. Aged seven, he expressed an interest in acting due to having an interest in storytelling; he also cited Disney Channel and Nickelodeon as an inspiration. His parents then enrolled him in a weekend stage school. He landed his first acting role when he was aged nine, after being cast in a West End theatre production of Oliver! at the Theatre Royal Drury Lane in Covent Garden. He was in the production until 2012.

Bobb-Semple's first television role was in the CBBC series Dixi as Zane in 2014. He starred in 30 episodes of the series. Aged 15 at the time, Bobb-Semple stated that it was "surreal" to be starring in his first screen project and recalled his mother accompanying him to the audition in Hackney, as well as his nervousness. Then from 2015 to 2017, he studied at Identity School of Acting. He appeared in fellow CBBC series So Awkward in 2016, as a guest star in one episode. As well as being in school, Bobb-Semple was working at a gym at the time and took time off to film for the episode in Manchester. In 2018, Bobb-Semple reached a wider audience after being cast in the Netflix drama series Free Rein. He starred as Alex in the second and third series, as well as a Christmas special.

Following the conclusion of Free Rein, Bobb-Semple landed a role on the CW series Pandora in 2019. He starred as Thomas James Ross throughout the first series. The series partially filmed in Bulgaria, which he found to be a "really cool" experience. In 2021, he joined the cast of the Peacock series One of Us Is Lying, an adaptation of the 2017 novel of the same name. He recurred as Evan Neiman in both series of the show. Then from 2022 to 2024, he appeared as Orlando Johnson on the CW series All American: Homecoming. He was initially cast as a recurring character for the first two series, but for the final series, he was promoted to a main cast member. He is related to Isaiah and Richard Bobb-Semple who are also actors.

== Filmography ==
Year	Title	Role	Notes
2014	Dixi	Zane	Main role
2016	So Awkward	Trent Gatsby	Episode: "Slang Gang"
2018–2019	Free Rein	Alex	Main role
2018	Free Rein: The Twelve Neighs of Christmas	Alex	Television film
2019	Pandora	Thomas James Ross	Main role
2021–2022	One of Us Is Lying	Evan Neiman	Recurring role
2022–2024	All American: Homecoming	Orlando Johnson	Main role
TBA	Tomb Raider	Zip	Main role
