= Free Rein =

British television series

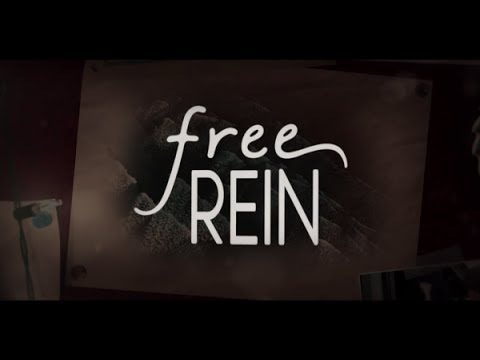
- Genre: Drama
- Created by: Vicki Lutas; Anna McCleery
- Starring: Jaylen Barron; Freddy Carter; Navia Robinson; Kerry Ingram; Manpreet Bambra; Bruce Herbelin-Earle; Céline Buckens; Caroline Ford; Carla Woodcock; Charlotte Jordan; Martin Bobb-Semple; Joe Ashman; Sadie Simm; Seth Carr; Sanchaez-Rain Li-Brown
- Opening theme: "No Matter" by Basic Tape versus Frances
- Country of origin: United Kingdom
- Original language: English
- No. of series: 3
- No. of episodes: 32

Production
- Executive producers: Rebecca Hodgson; Kate Little; Claire Poyser
- Production location: United Kingdom
- Running time: 25–33 minutes 60 minutes (special episodes)
- Production companies: Lime Pictures; Netflix

Original release
- Network: Netflix
- Release: 23 June 2017 – 6 July 2019

Free Rein is a British drama television series created and written by Vicki Lutas and Anna McCleery. Produced in the UK by Lime Pictures, the ten-part first series premiered on Netflix on 23 June 2017. Although the island where the series is set is fictional and unnamed, it is based on Anglesey, Wales, and is referred to as "an island off the coast of England" throughout the programme. The second series premiered on 6 July 2018. Shortly afterwards, Free Rein was renewed for a third series, as well as two feature-length special episodes. Free Rein: The 12 Neighs of Christmas, premiered on 7 December 2018. The second special, Free Rein: Valentine’s Day, premiered on 1 February 2019. The third series, consisting of 10 episodes, premiered on 6 July 2019. In January 2021, cast member Céline Buckens confirmed that the series had concluded.

== Cast and characters ==
=== Main ===
- Jaylen Barron as Zoe Phillips, a 15-year-old girl from Los Angeles, US who spends the summer in her mother's hometown in the United Kingdom, where she discovers a local stable and develops a kinship with a horse named Raven (the wildest in the stables and foal of Ruby Dawn). Zoe immediately becomes friends with Jade and Becky, two riders, upon arriving at Bright Fields.
- Freddy Carter as Peter "Pin" Hawthorne, a stable boy and son of Ted. In series two, it is revealed that he is a duke and inherits a fortune, which he uses to buy Raven and Bright Fields Stables. He has a horse named Elvis. One of the boys who has a crush on Zoe and later becomes her boyfriend.
- Navia Robinson as Rosie Phillips, Zoe's younger sister who has difficulty adjusting to the United Kingdom and stable life, but becomes friends with Ben. At the end of series two, she goes back to Los Angeles with Maggie. (series 1–2)
- Manpreet Bambra as Jade Gill, Zoe and Becky's best friend who rides at Bright Fields. In series three, she receives an honorary letter from David Attenborough after her successful horse project.
- Kerry Ingram as Rebecca "Becky" Sidebottom, Zoe and Jade's best friend who rides at Bright Fields, and Ben's older sister. She works part-time at The Barley Bag Cafe. Becky and her brother own a black and white Pinto Gypsy horse named Bob. In series three, she begins a horse club called The Breakfast Club, composed of Aaron, Winnie and Heather. For this, she receives a medal due to the contributions they made to the safety of the wild horses.
- Bruce Herbelin-Earle as Marcus Greenbridge, a well-liked rider and trainer at Bright Fields. He is Sam's cousin. At the end of series one, he gets accepted into the academy; being the only person from the island to go. However, he later drops out. In series three, he receives his qualification to be a trainer. Marcus has a romantic history with Mia, who he begins a relationship with in the third series.
- Céline Buckens as Amelia "Mia" MacDonald, a girl whose father financially supported Bright Fields in series one and two. She and Zoe immediately clash, but after episode nine, Mia and Zoe became friends. Mia owns Firefly. In the third series, Mia is thrown from Firefly, after which she has PTSD when around horses. Later that series, she discovers her father dumped building waste in the lake, which poisoned residents and wild horses, and helps bring him to justice. Mia has a romantic history with Marcus, who she begins a relationship with in the third series.
- Natalie Gumede as Margaret "Maggie" Steel-Phillips, Zoe and Rosie's mother. Maggie is a former equestrian, and as a child, she had a horse named Emerald. Maggie forbids Zoe from riding, but eventually started riding again to help her accept the fact that Zoe was going to ride. At the end of series two, she goes back to Los Angeles with Rosie. (series 1–2)
- Caroline Ford as Samantha "Sam" Myers, the owner of Bright Fields and one of the trainers. She is Marcus' cousin. However, it is revealed that she had been reluctantly working with the horse thieves who were trying to steal Raven in a desperate attempt to save Bright Fields from bankruptcy. (series 1)
- Noah Huntley (series 1–2) and Andrew Steele (series 3) as Elliot MacDonald, Mia's wealthy but often absent father. Elliot is a childhood friend of Maggie, and encourages Maggie to ride again. In the third series, Elliot goes to prison following dumping building waste in the lake.
- Geoffrey McGivern as Francis "Frank" Steel, Maggie's father and Zoe and Rosie's grandfather. In Free Rein: Twelve Neighs of Christmas, it is revealed that Frank has a long-lost brother, Owen, who Zoe reunites him with.
- Carla Woodcock as Susie Garrett, Mia's best friend who is often bossed around by Mia. In series two, she began dating Callum, a rider at Holloway, but later finds out that he attempted to cheat on her with Mia. In the third series, Susie had a job at the council offices and has become far more independent of Mia's influence, even threatening to end their friendship if she does not help her and the stable.
- Charlotte Jordan as Gaby Grant, the sister of James and a girl with a tragic past. It is revealed in Free Rein: 12 Neighs of Christmas that Gaby is homeless, and Zoe finds out which leads Zoe to ask Gaby to move in with her. In the third series, she bonds with Ariel, a wild horse, but allows her to be free. Gaby earns a place on the Under 18s Riding Team following Callum's disqualification. (series 2–3)
- Martin Bobb-Semple as Alex Barber, a friendly rider at Holloway and Becky's love interest and boyfriend. (series 2–3)
- Joe Ashman as Callum Elphick, Susie's ex-boyfriend and the bad boy of the neighbouring riding school. Susie broke up with him when Mia exposed him for attempting to cheat on Susie. In the third series, he helps Elliot to dump building waste in the local lake, in exchange for a place on the Under 18s Riding Team, which his father and brother have all been in. (series 2–3)
- Sadie Simm as Winnie, a girl who helps Becky out around Bright Fields. She is part of The Breakfast Club. (series 3)
- Seth Carr as Aaron Phillips, Zoe's cousin visiting from Los Angeles. His mother sends him to the Island in a final chance to prove he can be good before he sends him to boarding school. He is part of The Breakfast Club. (series 3)
- Sanchaez-Rain Li-Brown as Heather Wright, the daughter of Claire. She is part of The Breakfast Club, and owns a horse called Princess. (series 3)

=== Recurring ===
- Billy Angel as Benjamin "Ben" Sidebottom, Becky's younger brother, who befriends Rosie. (series 1–2)
- Milo Twomey as Tedward "Ted" Hawthorne, Pin's father who has a past with Maggie, and buried her horse Emerald when he died. Ted wants Pin to stay away from Zoe, as he believes that she will hurt Pin.
- Holly Hayes as Meredith Moore, Raven's former owner. The final episode of series one reveals that Raven was stolen from Meredith as a foal. When Meredith shows up to legally take Raven home with her, he refuses to leave Bright Fields. After Zoe reasons with Meredith, she agrees to board Raven at Bright Fields. At the end of series two, it is revealed that Pin bought Raven from her, as a gift for Zoe. (series 1–2)
- Ryan Sands as Huck Phillips, Zoe and Rosie's father, Maggie's husband, and Frank's son-in-law, as well as the apparent brother-in-law of Aaron's mother. (series 1–2)
- Paul Luebke as Derek Wrigley, a police officer who comes to the stables occasionally and had a crush on Sam. (series 1)
- Tom Forbes as James, the former trainer at Bright Fields and the current trainer at rival riding school, Holloway. (series 2)
- T'Nia Miller as Claire Wright, the new mayor of the island. Upon arrival, Claire wants to hunt down the wild horses to capture them, but she is later made to protect them, after Jade confronts her while on a livestream. (series 3)
- Joe Sims as Geoff, the bodyguard and assistant of Claire. (series 3)
- Anna Passey as Felicity, a rider who examines Marcus on his test to be an instructor. She later appears as a judge in the tryouts for the Under 18s Riding Team. (series 3)
- Paul Antony-Barber as Arthur, the butler at the castle that the Hawthorne family own. (series 3)

== Episodes ==
Series overview
Series	Episodes	Originally released
1	10	23 June 2017
2	10	6 July 2018
Christmas Special		7 December 2018
Valentine's Day Special		1 February 2019
3	10	6 July 2019

=== Series 1 (2017) ===
No. overall	No. in series	Title	Original release date
1	1	"Raven"	23 June 2017
When her sister Rosie goes missing after arriving at their grandfather's home in the United Kingdom, Zoe scours the area, meets some locals, and has a scary encounter. Zoe reaches the beach with her bike looking for Rosie but rather encounters a wild horse called, Raven. She somehow has some sort of connection with him unlike anyone else, for the fact he is a wild horse.
2	2	"Close Up"	23 June 2017
When Mia insists on mounting Raven for a photo shoot, Zoe must calm the wild horse so he can be saddled. Rosie snoops in her mom's childhood diary.
3	3	"Spying on Pin"	23 June 2017
To investigate her suspicions, Zoe defies her mom and sneaks off to the stables, where she has her first riding lesson and catches Pin red-handed.
4	4	"Pony Camp!"	23 June 2017
When Pin refuses to tell Zoe why he was stealing from the medical cabinet, she follows him home and finds out. Mia learns Zoe is not allowed to ride.
5	5	"The Sleepover"	23 June 2017
Still being mad at her mom for not letting her ride for no reason, Zoe meets up with Becky and Jade at a cafe where Mia and Marcus are present. On the way to the cafe, Mia invites Rosie to a sleepover. Zoe gets frustrated because of that. Zoe and her friends find an engraved riding crop that may have been left behind by the horse thief. They decided to inform Sam about this but she wouldn’t take to consideration. Since the horse thief could still come, they planned to have a sleep over in the stable for a lookout. At the sleepovers, Mia, Rosie, and Susie were looking at old photos while Zoe and her friends were favouring all of Marcus’s photos (mistakenly). Alarmed by the sound of a horse at the stables, Zoe and her friends were eager to catch the horse thieves, but turns out it was Zoes’s mom (on a horse) and Mia’s dad. While they were complaining (along with Mia, Susie, and Rosie), horse thieves are on action to take Raven. Zoe goes to rescue the day but in result, she ended up crashing to the ground and fainting.
6	6	"Horse Thief Hero"	23 June 2017
Zoe learns why her mom forbade her from riding. Jade uncovers a secret about Raven's past. Becky proves to Ben that horses are better than quad bikes.
7	7	"Emerald"	23 June 2017
Zoe learns more about Raven's mysterious origins. After finding what may be the real horse behind the ghost pony legend, Rosie realizes who "E" is.
8	8	"Pony Prom"	23 June 2017
Mia sabotages Zoe's plans for the barn dance. Becky sets a trap for the ghost pony, but she and her friends catch a suspected horse thief instead!
9	9	"The Search"	23 June 2017
Ben helps Rosie trick her dad into calling her mom. While leading the kids on an islandwide search on horseback for Raven, Zoe has it out with Mia.
10	10	"Show Down"	23 June 2017
The kids compete at the county show. An odd comment leads Zoe to realize who helped the horse thief, and sends her racing off to rescue Raven in time. *Note: Charlotte Dujardin guest stars as herself in the Season 1 finale.

=== Series 2 (2018) ===
No. overall	No. in series	Title	Original release date
11	1	"Rivals"	6 July 2018
When rival riding school Holloway steals Bright Fields’ recently won County Cup, Zoe and Pin must steal it back before Mia’s press interview begins.
12	2	"Golden Boy"	6 July 2018
The gang sees Pin in a new light. On his last day, Marcus confesses a guilty secret to Rosie. Becky says a heartfelt goodbye to Marcus.
13	3	"Maid of the Island"	6 July 2018
Things get out of hand during a jousting match at the annual Maid of the Island tournament when Zoe and Mia face off against Gaby from Holloway.
14	4	"Truth or Dare"	6 July 2018
At a beach party, a game of truth or dare forces Zoe to face her feelings for Pin, and a horse race on the sand leads her to betray Raven’s trust.
15	5	"Sweet 16"	6 July 2018
At Zoe’s 16th birthday bash, Gaby stirs up trouble between Pin and Marcus, Rosie plays matchmaker, and Mia gathers proof of Callum’s bad behaviour.
16	6	"Runaway"	6 July 2018
Zoe takes Raven to a private spot to win his forgiveness. Becky, Ben and Rosie stumble upon a mysterious discovery. Mia overhears an upsetting chat.
17	7	"Bob"	6 July 2018
A fire brings an unlikely hero to the rescue. Gaby reveals her painful past to Zoe and Pin. Jade comes through for Becky during a time of need.
18	8	"Gaby"	6 July 2018
Gaby secretly trains on Raven, but Zoe’s kindness makes her feel guilty. Rosie and Ben hunt for treasure in the tunnels. Pin makes plans with his mum.
19	9	"Road Trip"	6 July 2018
After Zoe and Pin miss the ferry to Nationals, they get a ride in Grandpa Frank’s van. But an empty gas tank leads to an unplanned trip to a fair.
20	10	"Nationals"	6 July 2018
At Nationals, Pin does things his way, Becky cures Jade’s fear of performing, Rosie uncovers an old family secret, and James tries to sabotage Raven.

=== Christmas Special (2018) ===
No. overall	No. in series	Title	Original release date
21	1	"The Twelve Neighs of Christmas"	7 December 2018
As Bright Fields prepares for its Mistletoe Ball, a broken ornament leads Zoe to a family secret, while Gaby finds herself at the mercy of new boss Mia.

=== Valentine’s Day Special (2019) ===
No. overall	No. in series	Title	Original release date
22	1	"Free Rein: Valentine’s Day"	1 February 2019
Love is in the air as Zoe and friends go on a quest to find a fabled Maid's Stone. But when rivalry blinds them to danger, it is Raven to the rescue.

=== Series 3 (2019) ===
No. overall	No. in series	Title	Original release date
23	1	"Wild Horses"	6 July 2019
Zoe's cousin from Los Angeles, Aaron, arrives earlier than expected. With the new mayor, Claire, arriving, the riders at Bright Fields organise an open day to impress her. However, Aaron leaves the gate open, and wild horses from the island stampede. Heather, Claire's daughter, tries to mount a wild horse but gets thrown off. She fakes an injury, leading to Claire wanting the horse captured.
24	2	"Hunted"	6 July 2019
Following Claire hunting for the wild horse, Pin and the Bright Fields riders set off to find her. On the way back, Mia is thrown off of Firefly, leading to her developing anxiety when around horses. Becky starts The Breakfast Club, composed of Aaron, Winnie and Heather. Susie starts her internship at the council office, and uses insider information to warn the riders about Claire.
25	3	"Ariel"	6 July 2019
Zoe and Gaby attempt to figure out what's wrong with the wild horse, Ariel. Mia goes to the council offices and manages to talk Claire into firing Susie and hiring her; due to her fear of horses after the accident with Firefly. Marcus' exam for a trainer qualification is moved up, and when Mia fails to show up, Pin fills in, but he fails the exam.
26	4	"The Tea Party"	6 July 2019
Aaron suggests the riders host a tea party at Pin's family castle and invite the mayor in order to persuade her into protecting the wild horses. Zoe was meant to give the speech, but due to her competing with Gaby, she is late, and Jade fills in for her. She agrees that the horses are special, until Zoe trips into Aaron, splashing cream all over the mayor.
27	5	"Foal O'Clock"	6 July 2019
Marcus notices that Mia is upset, and tells her to face her fears. Ariel gives birth to a foal, named Scout, with the help of Mia. It is revealed that Raven is the father of the foal. Claire turns up to take Ariel away, but Jade starts a livestream on Becky's blog with 3 million subscribers, and coerces her into protecting the horses and supporting her horse project. At the end of an episode, a wild horse chokes and collapses.
28	6	"Pony Safari"	6 July 2019
Pin hosts a pony camp, and when Winnie's classmates turn up demanding a photo with Ariel, Pin and Zoe are in disagreement on what to do. Mia begins to show trust in horses again, after helping out at the pony camp. Zoe paints Raven so that he looks like Ariel, and rides him. Carly, Winnie's classmate, posts the video of it, which goes viral.
29	7	"Tryouts"	6 July 2019
The tryouts for the Under 18s Riding Team are held, to which Zoe, Gaby, Mia, Susie and Callum compete in. While looking after Scout, Aaron loses Ariel. At the tryouts, Gaby steals Zoe's riding routine, and Jade discovers the horse tags in the bin outside. Callum is revealed as the winner of the tryouts.
30	8	"Princess"	6 July 2019
When Zoe, Jade and Gaby sneak into the mayor's office to find information about the wild horses, Zoe discovers that Gaby was the reserve for the Under 18s Riding Team. She also finds a receipt for horse food being delivered to Claire's house. They go to her house, but discover that the food was part of Heather's birthday present; her horse, Princess. Mia mishears Marcus talking about Princess, thinking he was talking about her, rather than the horse.
31	9	"Victory Parade"	6 July 2019
Jade and Becky sneak into the castle, suspicious that Arthur, the butler, is poisoning Pin and the wild horses. However, when they go searching in the lake, they find building waste, containing lead. Jade explains that Pin, Arthur, and the horses suffer from lead poisoning. Claire hosts a parade with Callum as showman, but he drops out. Zoe decides that she wants to move back to Los Angeles with Raven.
32	10	"S.O.S."	6 July 2019
Zoe and Gaby go hunting for the wild horses, and after finding them, Callum locks them in the barn. With the horse tags, Zoe sends an S.O.S. message via morse code, which Aaron receives and goes to save them with The Breakfast Club. When they arrive at the barn, they break them out and head to Elliot's Firefly Hotel opening. It is revealed that Elliot dumped the waste and got Callum to help dump the waste and collect the horses in an exchange for a place on the Under 18s Riding Team. Mia goes to find her father, and with a horse tag, manages to alert the police to his location. In a 3 month later flash-forward, it shows Becky getting a medal, Jade getting an honorary letter from David Attenborough, and Gaby getting the spot on the team. Mia says thank you to Marcus, and kisses him. Gaby lets Ariel run wild, and it is revealed that Gaby sent the video of Zoe riding to a school in Florida, and they want her to audition.

== Awards and nominations ==
Year	Award	Category	Nominee(s)	Result
2018	NAACP Image Awards	Outstanding Children's Program	Free Rein	Nominated
2018	Daytime Emmy Awards	Outstanding Children's or Family Viewing Series	Free Rein	Won
2018	Daytime Emmy Awards	Outstanding Directing for a Children's or Family Viewing Series	Paul Walker	Won
2018	Daytime Emmy Awards	Outstanding Writing in a Children's, Pre-School Children's or Family Viewing Program	Vicki Lutas and Anna McCleery	Nominated
2019	WGGB Awards	Best Children's TV episode	Vicki Lutas and Anna McCleery	Won
2019	Daytime Emmy Awards	Outstanding Directing for a Children's, Preschool Children's or Family Viewing Program	Free Rein	Nominated
2020	Daytime Emmy Awards	Outstanding Writing for a Children's or Young Adult Program	Vicki Lutas and Anna McCleery	Nominated
