= Elizabeth Macneal =

British writer

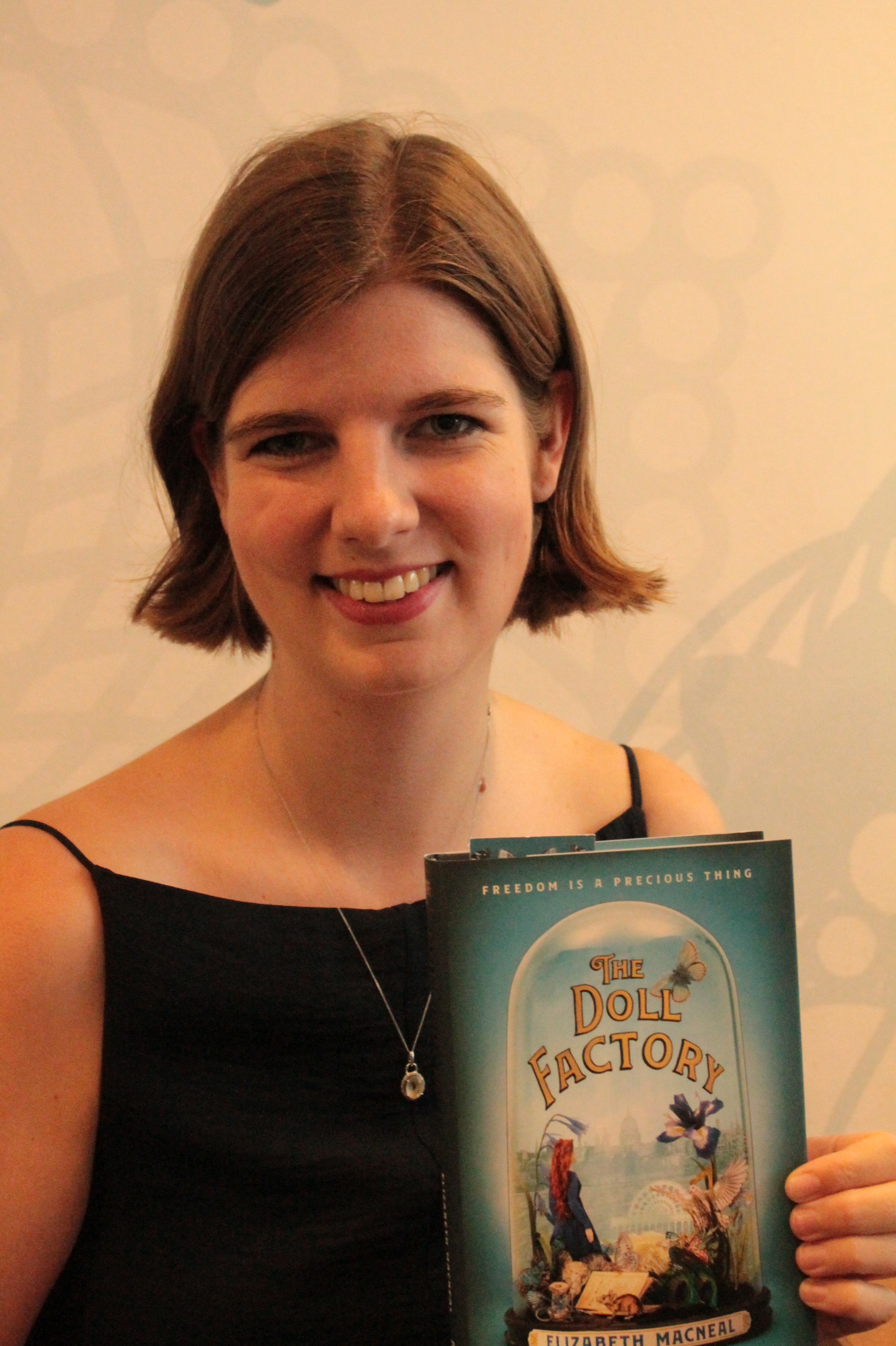
- Elizabeth Macneal holding "The Doll Factory"
- Born: 16 October 1988 (age 37); Edinburgh, Scotland
- Occupation: novelist
- Writing career
- Period: 2018–
- Website: elizabethmacneal.com

Elizabeth Sarah Macneal (born 16 October 1988) is a bestselling Scottish writer. She has had three novels published, The Doll Factory (2019), Circus of Wonders (2021) and The Burial Plot (2024). Her work has been translated into 29 languages and adapted for TV.

== Profile ==
Elizabeth was born in Edinburgh on 16 October 1988. She is the oldest of four children to Edinburgh architect Lorn Macneal and his wife Catharine.

She studied English literature at Somerville College, Oxford. After graduating, she did further postgraduate study at the University of East Anglia as a Malcolm Bradbury Scholar, where she gained an MA.

She lives in South London with her husband and children.

== Works ==
Elizabeth is also a successful ceramicist. The Evening Standard named Macneal as 'one of five British ceramicists you should know about.'

In 2019, Macneal’s first novel The Doll Factory was published by Picador in the United Kingdom and Atria Publishing Group in the United States, in addition to 29 international territories. The book explores the complex relationship between Iris Whittle and her artist-admirer, Louis Frost; and Silas Reed, a taxidermist and curio-collector. It is set in London at the time of the Great Exhibition, amidst the world of the Pre-Raphaelite Brotherhood. The character of Iris is influenced by the Pre-Raphaelite model, Lizzie Siddal.

The Doll Factory was an instant Sunday Times bestseller, and was turned into a TV series of the same name, a major series launching on Paramount+ in December 2023.

Macneal’s second novel, Circus of Wonders, was published in 2021. Set in the world of the Victorian freak show, it is a story of power and ownership, fame and the threat of invisibility. It was a Sunday Times bestseller, and was called ‘glittering’ by The Guardian and ‘exhilarating’ by The Sunday Times.

In June 2024, Picador published Macneal’s third novel, The Burial Plot. Described as ‘ingenious’ by The Sunday Times, it is about murder, manipulation and the construction of a grand Victorian cemetery.

== Awards and honours ==
- Caledonian Novel Award 2018 (pre-publication)
- The Times bestseller
- Sunday Times Top Ten bestseller
- Radio 2 Book Club pick
- Radio 4 Book at Bedtime
- Radio 4 Book of the Week
