= Manpreet Bambra =

English actress

- Born: 10 July 1992 (age 34); London, England
- Education: London College of Fashion (MSc)
- Occupation: Actress
- Years active: 2009–present
- Television: Wizards vs Aliens; Free Rein

Manpreet Bambra (born 10 July 1992) is an English actress. She is known for her roles in the CBBC series Wizards vs Aliens (2012–2014), the Netflix series Free Rein (2017–2019), and the ITVX horror sitcom Count Abdulla (2023).

== Early life and education ==
Bambra grew up in Water Oakley in Bray, Berkshire. She attended St. George's School, Ascot where she took LAMDA acting classes offered by the school. She was accepted to the National Youth Theatre. She took a gap year before university and later graduated with a Master of Science in Cosmetic Science from the London College of Fashion.

== Career ==
Bambra made her acting debut in Our Time Alone, a short film in 2009, portraying the role of Harpreet. Between 2012 and 2014, Bambra played the recurring role of Katie Lord in CBBC drama Wizards Vs Aliens. Since then, Bambra had short stints in Corner Shop Show, Doctors, So Awkward, The Dumping Ground and Casualty. In 2017, Bambra began portraying the role of Jade in Netflix original series Free Rein. In October 2019, she made her third appearance in the BBC soap opera Doctors as Sonia Gill for one episode.

== Filmography ==
Year	Title	Role	Notes
2009	Our Time Alone	Harpreet	Short film
2011	Postcode	Sheela	3 episodes
2012	Tezz	Anil's Daughter	Film
2012	Doctors	Cas Ingalls	1 episode
2012–2014	Wizards vs Aliens	Katie Lord	Recurring role; 15 episodes
2014	A Journey's End	Girl	Short film
2015	Playing Ball	Kay	Short film
2015	Corner Shop Show	Shameena	2 episodes
2016	Doctors	Sunpreet Sharda	1 episode
2016	So Awkward	Jade	Recurring role; 6 episodes
2017	The Dumping Ground	Anjili	1 episode
2017	Casualty	Neysa Mehat	1 episode
2017–2019	Free Rein	Jade	Main role
2017	The Boy With The Topknot	Young Aunt Sharanjit	Television film
2018	Ravers	Hannah	Film
2018	Free Rein: The 12 Neighs of Christmas	Jade	Netflix film
2019	Free Rein: Valentine's Day	Jade	Netflix film
2019	Doctors	Sonia Gill	1 episode
2019	Secret Life of Boys	Amy	1 episode
2020	Hate	Sara	Short film
2020	Catch a Butcher	Ajalaa	Short film
2023	Funny Woman	Anya	2 episodes
2023	Count Abdulla	Amrita	6 episodes
2024	Sister Boniface Mysteries	Phoebe Volante	1 episode
2024	Cheaters	Rupa	1 episode
2025	Not Going Out	Suki	1 episode
