= Remington Hoffman =

American actor and director (born 1988)

- Born: Edward Remingtonich Hoffman; May 3, 1988 (age 38); Santa Cruz, California, U.S.
- Education: Cabrillo College
- Occupations: Actor, director, producer
- Years active: 2010–present
- Television: Days of Our Lives; Zatima
- Spouse: Ida Barklund (m. 2020)
- Children: 1

Remington Hoffman (born Edward Remingtonich Hoffman; May 3, 1988) is an American actor, director and producer. He is best known for his roles as Li Shin in the NBC soap opera Days of Our Lives (2020–2024). and as Bryce in the comedy-drama series Zatima (2022–present).

== Early life ==
Edward Remingtonich Hoffman was born in Santa Cruz, California, on May 3, 1988. He is identified as of Japanese ancestry, when his grandmother Ellen, along with his great-grandparents, were in the Japanese American Internment in World War II. He studied acting in Keuka College in Keuka Park, New York, for which he was nominated for two Irene Ryan Awards for his portrayals of Tom in Neil LaBute's Fat Pig and Judas in Stephen Adly Gurgis's Last Days. He also graduated from Cabrillo College with an AA degree, and attended Santa Monica College for Graphic Arts and Web Design

== Career ==
Hoffman eventually dropped out of business school and moved to Los Angeles, where he could hone his acting skills. In 2011, he made his acting debut as Martin Jones in the short film 15 Hours Before War. Afterwards, he played minor roles in Mortal Kombat: Legacy, Don't Trust the B— in Apartment 23 and You're the Worst. In 2015, he played the role of Trev in Real Hollywood for 11 episodes. He made recurring and guest appearances in Agents of S.H.I.E.L.D., Animal Kingdom, Criminal Minds, The Catch and Station 19.

In 2020, he joined the cast of the long-running NBC soap opera Days of Our Lives as the new character, Li Shin. He left the show after his character's last appearance aired on August 22, 2024. During his time on Days of Our Lives, Hoffman was also cast as Bryce in the BET+ comedy-drama television series Zatima, starring Devale Ellis and Crystal Renee Hayslett, and created by Tyler Perry.

== Personal life ==
Hoffman met Ida Barklund in 2017, and they were married on March 13, 2020. The couple announced that they've welcomed their first child, a baby girl (b. 2022).

== Filmography ==
=== Film ===
| Year | Title | Role | Notes |
|---|---|---|---|
| 2011 | 15 Hours Before War | Martin Jones | Short film |
| 2013 | Vampires in Venice | Keith | |
| 2017 | The Run Saga: Breathe | Brian Yune | |
| 2019 | Tune in for Love | Jong-U | |
| 2022 | Bar Fight! | Alexander | |
| 2024 | Breathe | Brian Yune | |
| 2024 | Do You Want to Die in Indio? | Doug the Taco Truck Guy | |
| 2025 | Cyber Syndicate | Richard | Short film |

=== Television ===
| Year | Title | Role | Notes |
|---|---|---|---|
| 2013 | Don't Trust the B— in Apartment 23 | Handsome Man #1 | Episode: "Dating Games..." |
| 2013 | Mortal Kombat: Legacy | Bi-Han's Father | Episode: "Liu Kang and Kung Lao reunite in Macau" |
| 2014 | You're the Worst | Waiter | Episode: "Insouciance" |
| 2015 | Real Hollywood | Trev | 11 episodes |
| 2016 | D_Sawz Tv | Tyler / St. Peter | Television miniseries |
| 2017 | Criminal Minds | Wesley Parham | Episode: "A Good Husband" |
| 2017 | The Catch | AVI Agent #2 | Episode: "The Hammer" |
| 2018 | Agents of S.H.I.E.L.D. | Matson-Dar | Episodes: "Fun & Games" and "Together or Not At All" |
| 2018 | Animal Kingdom | Eric | Episode: "Wolves" |
| 2019 | Eagles | Mitch | Episode: "Sleepover" |
| 2019 | Chad & Abby in Paris | Li Shin | Television miniseries |
| 2020 | Westworld | Gibbons | Episode: "The Absence of Field" |
| 2020 | Station 19 | Sting Ray | Episode: "I'll Be Seeing You" |
| 2020–2024 | Days of Our Lives | Li Shin | 111 episodes |
| 2020 | Extracurricular | Mr. Choi (voice) | English version 2 episodes |
| 2020 | Birthmother's Betrayal | Officer Cho | Television movie |
| 2020 | Sweet Home | Do-Hun | 10 episodes |
| 2022 | Call Me Kat | Doug | Episode: "Call Me Cupid" |
| 2022–present | Zatima | Bryce | Main cast |
| 2022 | Days of Our Lives: Beyond Salem | Li Shin | Television miniseries |
| 2022 | Breakwater | Troy | 4 episodes |
| 2023 | Strong Girl Nam-soon | Additional voice | 2 episodes |
| 2025 | The Rookie | Hell P.D. Actor | Episode: "A Deadly Secret" |
