= KJ Smith =

American actress (born 1985)

KJ Smith-Black
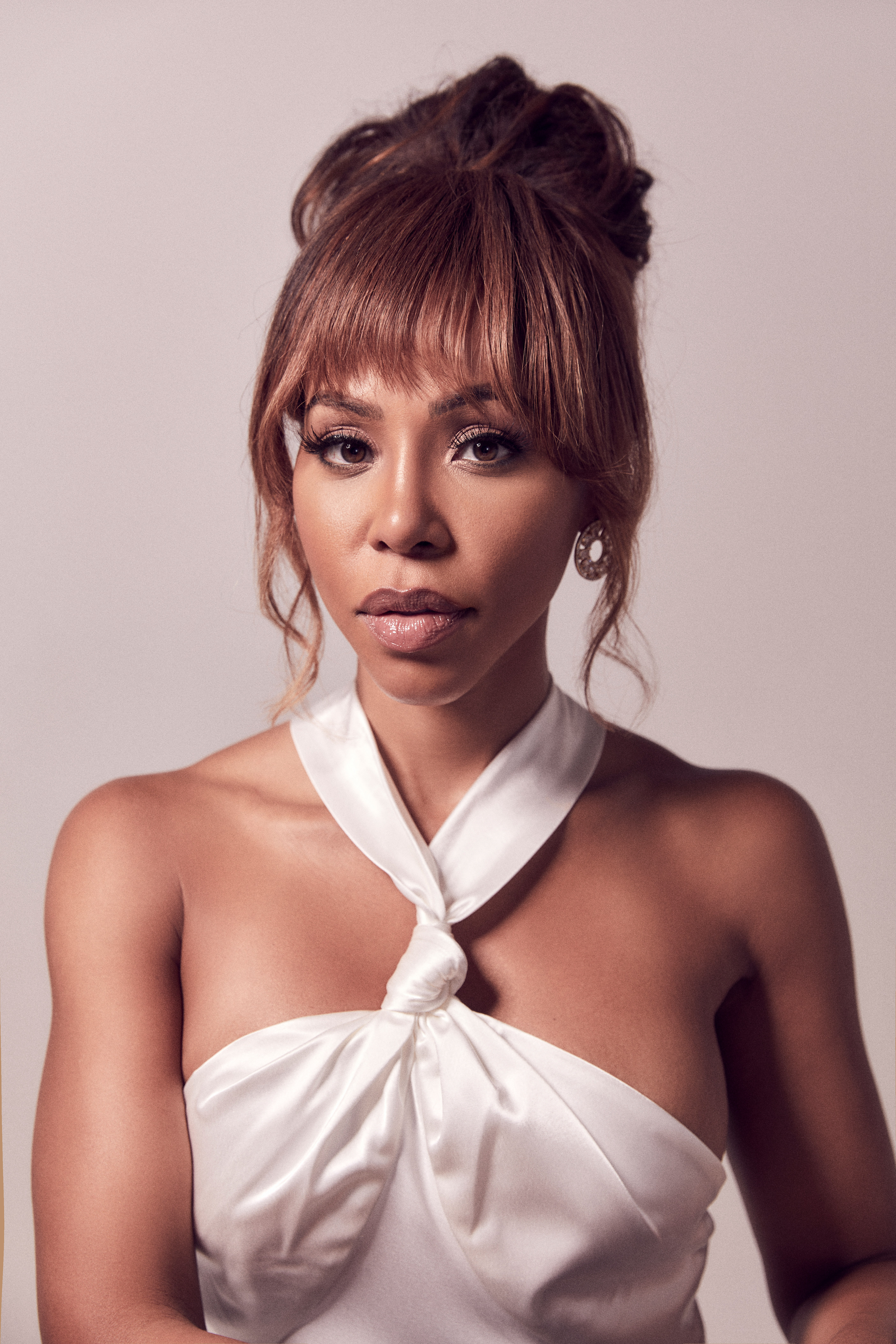
- Born: Khaneshia JaNea Smith; May 6, 1985 (age 41); Tallahassee, Florida, U.S.
- Education: Florida State University (BA) Florida A&M University
- Occupation: Actress
- Years active: 2009–present
- Spouse: Skyh Black (m. 2023)
- Children: 1

Khaneshia Smith Black (née Smith), (born May 6, 1985) known professionally as KJ Smith, is an American actress, known for her role as Andrea "Andi" Barnes in the comedy-drama, Sistas.

== Early life ==
Smith was born on May 6, 1985, in Tallahassee, Florida. She was a cheerleader and softball player in high school. She studied Business Marketing at Florida State University, where she earned her bachelor's degree and later went on to work in corporate America. Smith later went back to further her education at Florida A&M University, where she studied journalism.

== Career ==
Smith began her acting career in 2009 with appearing in short films and small parts in television comedies include Conan, Real Husbands of Hollywood, Jimmy Kimmel Live! and Comedy Bang! Bang!. She also guest-starred in a number of sitcoms such as Survivor's Remorse, Mann & Wife, It's Always Sunny in Philadelphia and Black-ish. She played secondary role in the 2015 made-for-television movie Whitney and the following year had a recurring role in the Oprah Winfrey Network drama series, Queen Sugar.

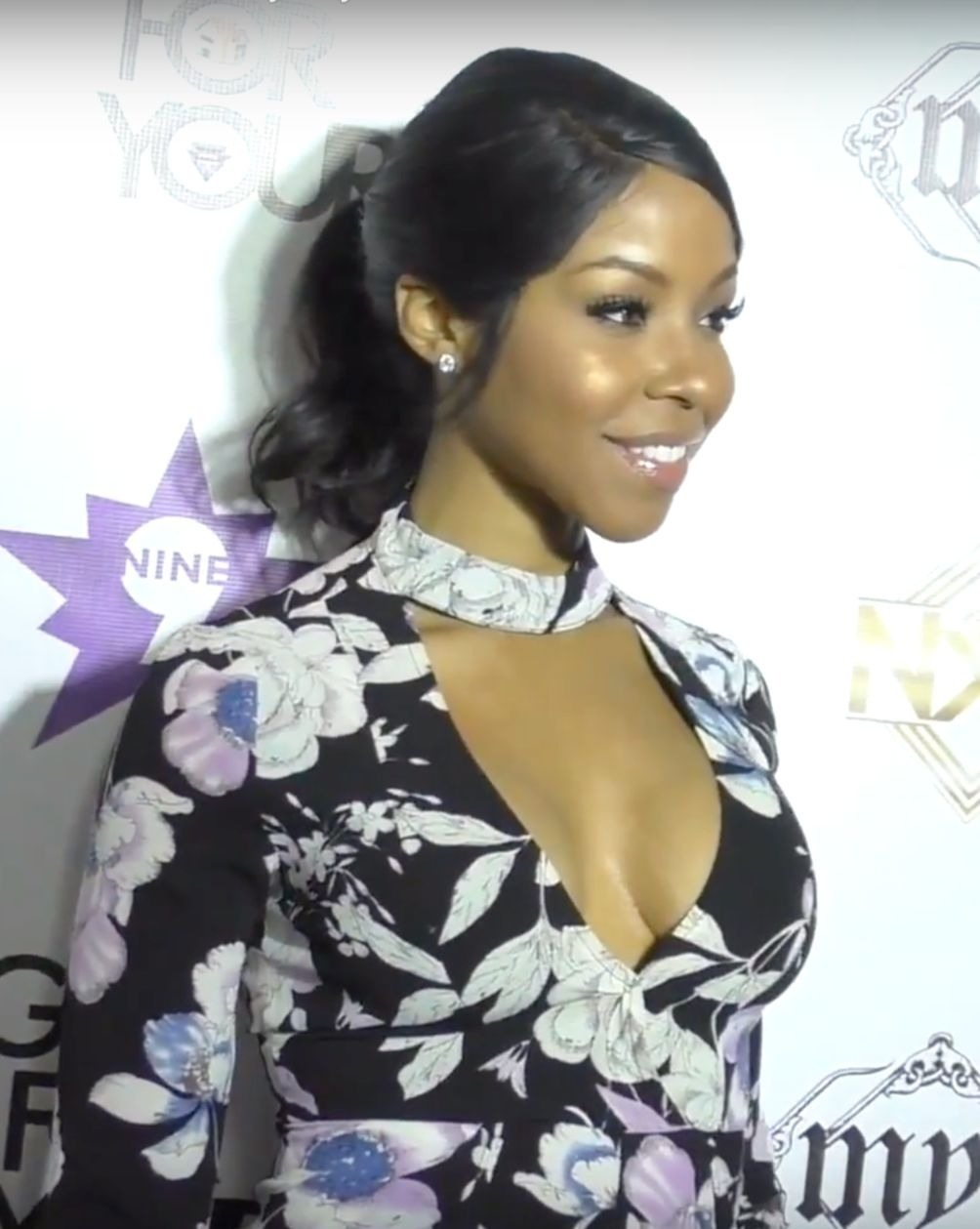
Smith in 2016

In 2017, Smith had a recurring role during the first season of the CW comedy-drama series, Dynasty, and guest-starred on Being Mary Jane, Saints & Sinners and Ozark. In 2018, she co-starred in the web drama series, Giants produced by Issa Rae. Smith also made guest appearances on NCIS: Los Angeles, The Fosters, Lethal Weapon, Fuller House, Family Reunion, All Rise and blackAF. From 2015 to 2018, she had a recurring role on Bounce TV sitcom Family Time and in 2019 had a recurring role in short-lived ABC legal drama, The Fix, In 2019, she co-starred in the comedy film A Madea Family Funeral and the following year appeared in psychological thriller Fatal Affair for Netflix. Smith also played the lead role in the drama film The Available Wife (2020).

From 2019 to 2021, Smith starred in the BET family drama series, The Family Business. In 2019 she landed her breakthrough role as Andrea "Andi" Barnes in the BET comedy-drama series, Sistas opposite Ebony Obsidian, Novi Brown and Mignon Von. In 2022, she also had a recurring role in season two of the Power prequel series, Power Book III: Raising Kanan, on STARZ.

== Personal life ==
Smith is married to actor and Sistas co-star Skyh Alvester Black. In May 2025, Smith and Black announced that they were expecting their first child. In August 2025, Smith and Black revealed to People that they moved from Los Angeles to Stone Mountain, Georgia to be closer to their families because both their families are on the East Coast. Their 10,348 sq. ft. property was built in 1976 which consists of five bedrooms, seven bathrooms, an indoor pool, a theater, bar, and gym. On October 23, 2025, they welcomed their first daughter.

== Filmography ==
=== Film ===
Year	Title	Role	Notes
2009	Talent	Waitress	Short
2010	Dogs Are a Woman's Best Friend	Jasmin	Short
2010	The City	-	Short
2010	Cocoa Love	Funeral Attendee	Short
2011	Hope	Arissa	Short
2011	Sex/Absurd	Whitney	
2011	Hot Girls on the Beach	Bianca	Video
2012	One Call Away	Restaurant Patron #1	Short
2015	Whitney	Girl with Steve	TV movie
2017	Baker's Man	Naomi	
2017	Love at the Shore	Maureen	TV movie
2017	Caravaggio and My Mother the Pope	Gospel Nurse	
2018	Throwback Holiday	Kimberly Wiggins	
2019	A Madea Family Funeral	Carol	
2019	I Got the Hook Up 2	Lieutenant Moore	
2019	I Left My Girlfriend for Regina Jones	Denise	
2020	Fatal Affair	Deborah Lee	
2020	The Available Wife	Nicole	

=== Television ===
Year	Title	Role	Notes
2011	Make Love Not War	Tracy Stoudimire	Recurring Cast: Season 2
2011	All My Children	Gloria the Resort Waitress	Episode: "Episode #1.10632"
2011	1000 Ways to Die	Sorority Girl	Episode: "Death, the New Black"
2012	Conan	Comedy Sketch Player	Episode: "Episode #2.54" & "#2.120"
2013	The Therapist	Dr. Monica Knight	Recurring Cast: Season 2
2013	Jacked Up	Ashley	Main Cast
2013	Real Husbands of Hollywood	Young Woman #1	Episode: "Frauditions" & "The Bump Stops Here"
2014	Friday: The Web Series	Mrs. Parker	Episode: "Deebo Ditch"
2014	Jimmy Kimmel Live!	Sketch Artist	Episode: "Eva Longoria/Wiz Khalifa"
2014	Survivor's Remorse	Kiara	Episode: "On the Carpet"
2014–15	Black Boots	Blair	Recurring Cast: Season 1
2015	Almost 30	Cute Upbeat Girl	Episode: "Almost Roommates"
2015	Mann & Wife	Avery	Episode: "Mann's Bodyguard"
2015	Comedy Bang! Bang!	Female Witchbuster	Episode: "Weird Al Yankovic Wears a Different Hawaiian Shirt"
2015–18	Family Time	Melinda	Recurring Cast: Seasons 3–6
2016	It's Always Sunny in Philadelphia	Sequoia	Episode: "Frank Falls Out the Window"
2016	Nicky, Ricky, Dicky & Dawn	Miss Jody	Episode: "Ballet and the Beasts"
2016	Queen Sugar	Lena	Recurring Cast: Season 1
2017	Being Mary Jane	Sunitha Rashad	Episode: "Getting Judged"
2017	Saints & Sinners	Marlene	Episode: "This Union Will Be the Death of Me"
2017	Ozark	Stripper	Episode: "Tonight We Improvise"
2017	Dynasty	Kori Rucks	Recurring Cast: Season 1
2018	Giants	Bianca	Recurring Cast: Season 2
2018	The Inspectors	Gabby	Episode: "Stop the Presses"
2018	NCIS: Los Angeles	Chelsea Parker	Episode: "Reentry"
2018	Black-ish	Linda	Episode: "Collateral Damage"
2018	The Fosters	Angela	Episode: "Where the Heart Is"
2018	Lethal Weapon	Beth	Episode: "Leo Getz Justice"
2018	Fuller House	Producer	Episode: "President Fuller"
2019	The Fix	Charlie	Recurring Cast
2019	Family Reunion	Coach Wilson	Episode: "Remember the First Day of School?"
2019	All Rise	Cassie Lange	Episode: "Fool for Liv"
2019	Tales	Billie	Episode: "Ex-Factor"
2019–21	The Family Business	Sasha Duncan	Recurring Cast: Season 1, Main Cast: Season 2-3
2019–	Sistas	Andrea "Andi" Barnes	Main Cast
2020	BlackAF	Tischina	Episode: "yo, between you and me... this is because of slavery"
2020	Bruh	Andrea "Andi" Barnes	Recurring Cast: Season 1
2022	Power Book III: Raising Kanan	Palomar	Recurring Cast: Season 2
