= Skyh Black =

American actor and model (born 1988)

- Born: Alvester Martin; February 16, 1988 (age 38); Miami, Florida, U.S.
- Other name: Alvester Martin III
- Occupations: Actor; model; singer
- Years active: 2000–present
- Spouse: KJ Smith (m. 2023)
- Children: 1

Skyh Alvester Black (born February 16, 1988) is an American actor, dancer and model, known for his role in the BET+ drama series, All the Queen's Men.

== Life and career ==
Black was born Alvester Martin and raised by his grandparents in Miami, Florida. He took an interest in dance at three years old while watching Michael Jackson videos on television. He attended New World School of the Arts in Downtown Miami and later School of American Ballet in New York. Black later moved to Los Angeles and worked as a backup dancer for Rihanna, Mariah Carey and Beyonce. After appearing in Michael Jackson's posthumous music video "A Place with No Name", choreographer Debbie Allen pushed Black, who was homeless at the time, into acting. In 2016, Black released his debut R&B single and music video "Overdose" under the name Alv3ster. In 2017, he starred in the Vivica A. Fox Lifetime reality series, Vivica's Black Magic about her creation of all-male exotic dance group, and the following year, appeared in a small role in her film Kinky.

From 2020 to 2021, Black had a recurring role in the BET comedy-drama series, Sistas as Novi Brown's character love interest. In 2021, he was cast in a series regular role as Amp "Addiction" Anthony in the BET+ drama series, All the Queen's Men. Also in 2021, he starred in the Allblk legal drama series, Lace. He played his first leading film role in the 2022 thriller Stranger Next Door for Lifetime. In 2023, Black starred and co-executive produced BET+ thriller film Love Marry Kill and the Holiday romantic drama Christmas Angel He also starred and executive produced the romantic comedy-drama film, A Haitian Wedding.

== Personal life ==
In 2023, Black married actress KJ Smith, they first met together on the set of Sistas in 2020. They married on September 3, 2023, in Malibu. In May 2025, Black and Smith announced that they were expecting their first child. In August 2025, Black and Smith revealed to People that they moved from Los Angeles to Stone Mountain, Georgia to be closer to their families because both their families are on the East Coast. Their 10,400 sq. ft. property was built in 1976 which consists of five bedrooms, seven bathrooms, an indoor pool, a theater, bar, and gym.

== Filmography ==
=== Film ===
Year	Title	Role	Notes
2000	Center Stage	ABA Student	Uncredited
2007	Stomp the Yard	Mu Gamma Stepper	
2007	Bratz: The Movie	Dancer	
2011	Leave It on the Floor	Dancer	
2011	Footloose	Dancer	
2018	Kinky	Executive Trae	
2018	Beauty Mark	Karlos	Short film
2019	South Central Love	Kesean	
2022	Stranger Next Door	Jesse Holmes	
2023	Love Marry Kill	Marcus Benoit	Co-executive producer
2023	Christmas Angel	Calvin	
2023	A Haitian Wedding	Patrick Casey	Executive producer

=== Television ===
Year	Title	Role	Notes
2017	Vivica's Black Magic	Himself	8 episodes
2017	Tales	Rory	Episode: "You Got Me"
2019	Hello Cupid 3.0	Ali	Web series, 8 episodes
2019	The Chadwick Journals	Darnell	Web series, 4 episodes
2020	Stuck with You	Raymond	Episodes: "Lemons and Oranges" and "Beware of the Ex"
2021	Lucifer	Hot Bounty	Episode: "Bloody Celestial Karaoke Jam"
2021	Black Monday	Arnie Markowitz	Episode: "Four!"
2020–2021	Sistas	Jacobi	17 episodes
2021–present	All the Queen's Men	Amp "Addiction" Anthony	Series regular
2021	Lace	Othello Charles	Series regular, 6 episodes
