= All the Queen's Men (TV series) =

American drama television series by Tyler Perry

- Also known as: Tyler Perry's All the Queen's Men
- Genre: Drama; Crime; Romance; Thriller
- Created by: Christian Keyes
- Based on: Ladies Night by Christian Keyes
- Written by: Christian Keyes; Tyler Perry
- Starring: Eva Marcille; Skyh Alvester Black; Candace Maxwell; Racquel Palmer; Michael Bolwaire; Keith Swift; Dion Rome; Jeremy Williams; Christian Keyes; Carter the Body; Oshea Russell; Kiki Haynes; Rashan Ali; Charles Dumas; La'Toya Kirkland; Chrystale Wilson
- Country of origin: United States
- Original language: English
- No. of seasons: 5
- No. of episodes: 78

Production
- Executive producers: Tyler Perry; Michelle Sneed; Christian Keyes; Mike Strong; Deandra Short; Kim Fields; Elon Johnson; Asante White; Valencia Parker; Armani Ortiz; Matthew Barnes; Tony L. Strickland; Andy Norman; Mavro Diamanti; Tsedy Gebeyehu; Valencia Y. Hawkins; Antoinetta Stallings; Mark E. Swinton; Jason Moss
- Producers: Eva Marcille; KiKi Haynes; Michael Bolwaire; Skyh Black; Candice Maxwell
- Camera setup: Multiple camera
- Running time: 40–43 min.
- Production company: Tyler Perry Studios

Original release
- Network: BET+
- Release: September 9, 2021 – September 4, 2025
- Network: Paramount+
- Release: June 10, 2026 – present

All the Queen's Men is an American drama television series created by Christian Keyes and executive produced by Tyler Perry. It premiered on BET+ on September 9, 2021. The series is an adaptation 'made for television' based on the 2015 urban romance novel Ladies Night, which Keyes authored himself and was presented by Carl Weber.

== Plot ==
Set in Atlanta, Marilyn "Madam" DeVille (Eva Marcille) is a fierce businesswoman who rules all in the lucrative male exotic nightclub industry. Madam is surrounded by a band of trusted employees who are down to make sure that she and her empire are successful. As her journey continues, she is hellbent on expanding her Queendom. However, Madam soon discovers that more money and more power mean more problems.

== Cast and characters ==
=== Main ===
- Eva Marcille as Marilyn "Madam" DeVille
- Skyh Alvester Black as Amp "Addiction" Anthony
- Candace Maxwell as DJ Dime
- Racquel Palmer as Blue
- Michael Bolwaire as Doc
- Keith Swift as Babyface
- Dion Rome as El Fuego
- Calen Kirin Meeks as Jay
- Jeremy Williams as Midnight
- Christian Keyes as Raphael "The Concierge" Damascus (season 2–present; recurring, season 1), Madam's love interest
- Oshea Russell as Tommy (season 3-present; recurring, seasons 1–2)
- Kiki Haynes as Detective Katrina Davis (season 3; recurring, seasons 1–2), Doc's love interest
- Carter the Body as Trouble (season 3; recurring, seasons 1–2)
- Rashan Ali as Ms. Tandy (season 4; recurring, seasons 1–3), Jack Tandy's wife and Babyface's lover
- Charles Dumas as James "Cadillac" DeVille (season 4; recurring, seasons 1–3), the father of Marilyn and Carla
- La'Toya Kirkland as Nurse Johnson (season 4: recurring, seasons 1–3), James' lover
- Chrystale Wilson as Carla DeVille (season 4: recurring, seasons 1–3), Madam's sister

=== Recurring ===
- Jeryl Prescott as Judge Martha Ross
- Sherrice Eaglin As Samantha (Season 5)
- Julia Pace Mitchell as Ms. Patty (seasons 1–2)
- Donna Biscoe as Patrice Ellis (seasons 1–2)
- Bruna Boa Mutunda as Shemika
- Donny Carrington as Red
- Tony Bellissimo as Casanova
- Leslie Sheri as Teresa Singleton (season 2)
- J. Marques Johnson as Rayshon (seasons 2–3)
- Buster Camp as Champ (seasons 2–3)
- Justus Pickett as Fernando (season 2–3)
- Enya Flack as D.A. Rodds (season 3)
- Timothy Bayou Banga Roberts as Big D (season 3), Dime's lover
- Gwendolyn Osborne as Dr. Cabrera (season 4)

== Episodes ==
Season	Episodes		Originally released		
Season	Episodes		First released	Last released	Network
1	10		September 9, 2021		BET+
2	20	10	July 14, 2022	August 11, 2022	BET+
2	20	10	January 12, 2023	February 9, 2023	BET+
3	16	8	July 20, 2023	August 31, 2023	BET+
3	16	8	January 11, 2024	February 22, 2024	BET+
4	16	8	November 28, 2024	January 9, 2025	BET+
4	16	8	July 24, 2025	September 4, 2025	BET+
5	16	8	June 10, 2026	July 22, 2026	Paramount+
5	16	8	October 21, 2026	TBA	Paramount+

=== Season 1 (2021) ===
No. overall	No. in season	Title	Directed by	Written by	Original release date
1	1	"The Pilot"	Kim Fields	Christian Keyes & Joseph K.P. Simmons	September 9, 2021
2	2	"Silent Partner"	Kim Fields	Christian Keyes & Joseph K.P. Simmons	September 9, 2021
3	3	"Blackmail Baby"	Kim Fields	Christian Keyes & Joseph K.P. Simmons	September 9, 2021
4	4	"Looking at Trouble"	Kim Fields	Christian Keyes & Joseph K.P. Simmons	September 9, 2021
5	5	"Dirty Dancing"	Kim Fields	Christian Keyes & Joseph K.P. Simmons	September 9, 2021
6	6	"When the Family Feuds"	Kim Fields	Christian Keyes & Joseph K.P. Simmons	September 9, 2021
7	7	"Kryptonite"	Derrick Doose, Kim Fields	Christian Keyes & Joseph K.P. Simmons	September 9, 2021
8	8	"The Ringmaster"	Kim Fields	Christian Keyes & Joseph K.P. Simmons	September 9, 2021
9	9	"Balls to the Wall"	Tyler Perry	Tyler Perry	September 9, 2021
10	10	"Everybody vs Madam"	Tyler Perry	Tyler Perry	September 9, 2021

=== Season 2 (2022–23) ===
No. overall	No. in season	Title	Directed by	Written by	Original release date
Part 1
11	1	"Amplified"	Tyler Perry	Tyler Perry	July 14, 2022
12	2	"True Blue"	Tyler Perry	Tyler Perry	July 14, 2022
13	3	"Cash of the Titans"	Tyler Perry	Tyler Perry	July 21, 2022
14	4	"Mr. and Mrs. Money/Kill Bill"	Tyler Perry	Tyler Perry	July 21, 2022
15	5	"Bait and Switch"	Tyler Perry	Tyler Perry	July 28, 2022
16	6	"A Million Ways to Die"	Tyler Perry	Tyler Perry	July 28, 2022
17	7	"Pimpin' Ain't Easy"	Tyler Perry	Tyler Perry	August 4, 2022
18	8	"Big Momma Thang"	Tyler Perry	Tyler Perry	August 4, 2022
19	9	"C.R.E.A.M."	Tyler Perry	Tyler Perry	August 11, 2022
20	10	"Bombs Over Buckhead"	Tyler Perry	Tyler Perry	August 11, 2022
Part 2
21	11	"Consequences and Repercussions"	Tyler Perry	Tyler Perry	January 12, 2023
22	12	"Cloak and Dagger"	Tyler Perry	Tyler Perry	January 12, 2023
23	13	"The Target"	Tyler Perry	Tyler Perry	January 19, 2023
24	14	"Retribution"	Tyler Perry	Tyler Perry	January 19, 2023
25	15	"Good Cop, Bad Cop"	Tyler Perry	Tyler Perry	January 26, 2023
26	16	"Can You Keep a Secret"	Tyler Perry	Tyler Perry	January 26, 2023
27	17	"Deal or No Deal"	Tyler Perry	Tyler Perry	February 2, 2023
28	18	"The Sit Down"	Tyler Perry	Tyler Perry	February 2, 2023
29	19	"Danger, Danger"	Tyler Perry	Tyler Perry	February 9, 2023
30	20	"Never Get Too Comfortable"	Tyler Perry	Tyler Perry	February 9, 2023

=== Season 3 (2023–24) ===
No. overall	No. in season	Title	Directed by	Written by	Original release date
Part 1
31	1	"Deep Cover"	Armani Ortiz	Tyler Perry	July 20, 2023
32	2	"Daddy's Girl"	Armani Ortiz	Tyler Perry	July 20, 2023
33	3	"No Way Out"	Armani Ortiz	Tyler Perry	July 27, 2023
34	4	"The Choice is Yours"	Armani Ortiz	Tyler Perry	August 3, 2023
35	5	"Lost and Found"	Armani Ortiz	Tyler Perry	August 10, 2023
36	6	"Never Scared"	Armani Ortiz	Tyler Perry	August 17, 2023
37	7	"Weakness"	Armani Ortiz	Tyler Perry	August 24, 2023
38	8	"Never Bluff"	Armani Ortiz	Tyler Perry	August 31, 2023
Part 2
39	9	"Eye to Eye"	Armani Ortiz	Tyler Perry	January 11, 2024
40	10	"Nowhere to Hide"	Armani Ortiz	Tyler Perry	January 11, 2024
41	11	"The Ultimate Price"	Armani Ortiz	Tyler Perry	January 18, 2024
42	12	"The Crossroads"	Matt Alves	Valencia Parker	January 25, 2024
43	13	"I Got Five On It"	Matt Alves	Valencia Parker	February 1, 2024
44	14	"Déjà Vu"	Armani Ortiz	Valencia Parker	February 8, 2024
45	15	"Caught Slippin"	Armani Ortiz	Valencia Parker	February 15, 2024
46	16	"Check Mate"	Armani Ortiz	Valencia Parker	February 22, 2024

=== Season 4 (2024–25) ===
No. overall	No. in season	Title	Directed by	Written by	Original release date
Part 1
47	1	"Hail Mary"	Armani Ortiz	Valencia Parker	November 28, 2024
48	2	"Careless Whispers"	Armani Ortiz	Arthur Harris	November 28, 2024
49	3	"99 Problems"	Armani Ortiz	Yvette Foy	December 5, 2024
50	4	"Back in the Game"	Armani Ortiz	Monice Mitchell Simms	December 12, 2024
51	5	"Family Ties"	Armani Ortiz	Valencia Parker	December 19, 2024
52	6	"Gas Face"	Armani Ortiz	Tyler Perry	December 26, 2024
53	7	"Trick Daddy"	Armani Ortiz	Yvette Foy	January 2, 2025
54	8	"You Got Served"	Armani Ortiz	Valencia Parker	January 9, 2025
Part 2
55	9	"Rat-Tat-Tat-Tat"	Armani Ortiz	Tyler Perry	July 24, 2025
56	10	"Blow the Whistle"	Armani Ortiz	Tyler Perry	July 24, 2025
57	11	"Smoke and Mirrors"	Armani Ortiz	Craig LaMarsh	July 31, 2025
58	12	"Weak in the Knees"	Armani Ortiz	Tyler Perry	August 7, 2025
59	13	"U.N.I.T.Y"	Armani Ortiz	Tyler Perry	August 14, 2025
60	14	"Backstabbers"	Armani Ortiz	Tyler Perry	August 21, 2025
61	15	"All Eyez on Me"	Armani Ortiz	Tyler Perry	August 28, 2025
62	16	"Murder Was the Case"	Armani Ortiz	Tyler Perry	September 4, 2025

=== Season 5 (2026) ===
No. overall	No. in season	Title	Directed by	Written by	Original release date
Part 1
63	1	"I See Dead People"	Armani Ortiz	Valencia Parker	June 10, 2026
64	2	"They Not Like Us"	Armani Ortiz	Arthur Harris	June 10, 2026
65	3	"Pop Out and Show 'Em"	Armani Ortiz	Yvette Foy	June 17, 2026
66	4	"Man Down"	Armani Ortiz	Tamiko K. Brooks	June 24, 2026
67	5	"The Truth of the Matter"	Armani Ortiz	Deandra Short	July 1, 2026
68	6	"Wop Wop Wop"	Armani Ortiz	Chris Denson	July 8, 2026
69	7	"Cell Block One"	Armani Ortiz	Arthur Harris	July 15, 2026
70	8	"Certified Boogeyman"	Armani Ortiz	Valencia Parker	July 22, 2026
71	9	"Rabbit Hole"	Armani Ortiz	Valencia Parker	October 21, 2026
Madam's Shooter gets revealed
72	10	"Ain't You Tired"	Armani Ortiz	Valencia Parker	October 21, 2026
The Land Deal didn't go as planned

== Production ==
=== Development ===
The series was picked up by BET+ on February 24, 2021. The series premiered on September 9, 2021.

On February 1, 2022, the series was renewed for a second season.

On April 16, 2024, All the Queen's Men was renewed for a fourth season.

The fifth and final season is set to premiere on June 10, 2026 on Paramount+.

=== Casting ===
The main cast was revealed on March 25, 2021.

On March 17, 2022, J. Marques Johnson joined the cast in a recurring role for the second season.

== Novel adaptation ==
The television series in loosely based on Christian Keye's fictional story and characters from his 2015 urban novel Ladies Night. Whereas the main character in the television series is set around Marilyn 'Madam' DeVille and her crimes while the novel sets premise of the main character Amp Anthony and his crimes and romance. Albeit his character in the series have followed similar experiences relating to the book being an ex-con. Madam's name in the series is also changed from 'Madam' Mary Fox (novel) to Marilyn DeVille and is the owner of Club Eden as in the book, but however does not share relation to Anthony as the television series intertwines their stories together, as Amp is now Madam's estranged nephew. One other character adapted from the novel, DJ Dime is also named Allison, who in similarity with the book befriends and have a romantic relationship with Amp Anthony. The premise of the television series revolves more about the lives of the many exotic dancers at Club Eden but creates and leaves the central focus on Madam who becomes the villain and savior of the show.

== Crossovers ==
All the Queen's Men sets its own storyline and have not featured any crossover characters from other shows as of yet, however the main character Marilyn 'Madam' guest starred on Tyler Perry's Sistas in season 5 and was revealed to be the cousin of Fatima, an independent tough-minded character from the series that eventually gained her own spin-off series Zatima, Madam does a favor and helps Fatima's co-worker Andi, who needs help to get her friend Sabrina out of legal troubles. Also while not seen in episodes prior (Sistas), she also sent thugs to help out Fatima in her own troubles after being harassed by her co-worker Hayden. Fatima reveals this both to Andi after to the two met each other and Hayden while threatening him once again as a reminder to what really happened to him violently weeks ago.

Another character from the series, Alonzo "El Fuego" Garcia, appeared as a recurring character on Sistas rekindling his connection with Danni, a past college mate and friend to the ladies of the series. He tries to makes attempts at romance with Danni and flaunts his new career as a male exotic dancer at Club Eden, after years of losing weight and started his health and fitness journey after his long battle of being overweight (which is addressed often as a brief running gag in 'Queen's Men'), but the romance eventually fails after finally giving it a try with Danni, however he continued to do favors helping out the ladies on the series when needed from his multiple side jobs.

The actor Skyh Alvester Black, who portrays Amp on All the Queens Men did appear on Sistas as a recurring character named Jacobi who briefly dated Sabrina on their series. This in turn may have created confusion upon viewers as both series shares the same parallel universe in story plots.

The actress Raquel Palmer, who plays Blue on All the Queen's Men, also appeared on Sistas in a recurring role as Officer Rayah who is a childhood friend of Zac. They have a flirtatious, romantic/sexual tension association, which is complicated by their past, where Zac & his friends had a bet as to who could deflower her first.
