= Armani Ortiz =

American director

- Born: Armani Jay Ortiz; Bronx, New York, U.S
- Occupations: Director, producer
- Years active: 2015–present

Armani Jay Ortiz is an American director, writer, actor and producer. Known for work at Tyler Perry Studios, Ortiz directed over 100 episodes of television series. He directed the 2023 documentary film Maxine's Baby: The Tyler Perry Story, and in 2024 created and produced BET+ drama series, Perimeter.

== Life and career ==
Ortiz was born and raised in Bronx, New York and graduated from the St. John's University in Queens. After graduating in 2012, Ortiz started his career working for Sean Combs' Revolt TV. In 2015 he met Tyler Perry and moved to Atlanta for work at the Tyler Perry Studios. Since moving to Atlanta, Ortiz directed several short films, most notable Noir (2020). In 2022 he began directing episodes of Tyler Perry's series Bruh, Zatima, Tyler Perry's Young Dylan, Sistas, Ruthless, The Oval and All the Queen's Men.

In 2023, Ortiz co-directed alongside Gelila Bekele the documentary film Maxine's Baby: The Tyler Perry Story. It was released on November 17, 2023, by Amazon Prime Video to positive reviews from critics. In 2024 he created, directed and produced BET+ drama series, Perimeter.
