= Sistas (TV series) =

American comedy drama television series

- Also known as: Tyler Perry's Sistas
- Genre: Comedy drama Crime; Romance; Thriller; Soap opera Satire
- Created by: Tyler Perry
- Written by: Tyler Perry
- Directed by: Tyler Perry
- Starring: KJ Smith; Mignon Von; Ebony Obsidian; Novi Brown; Devale Ellis; Chido Nwokocha; Anthony Dalton; Brian Jordan Jr.; Kevin Walton; Crystal Renee Hayslett; Trinity Whiteside; Chris Warren; Angela Beyincé; Branden Wellington; Monti Washington; Devin Way; Joi Symone; Tonya Pinkins; David Lami Friebe; Austin Scott
- Country of origin: United States
- Original language: English
- No. of seasons: 10
- No. of episodes: 213

Production
- Executive producers: Tyler Perry; Michelle Sneed; Asante White
- Camera setup: Single
- Running time: 42 minutes
- Production company: Tyler Perry Studios

Original release
- Network: BET
- Release: October 23, 2019 – present

Related
- Zatima

Sistas is an American comedy drama television series created, written and executive produced by Tyler Perry that premiered on October 23, 2019, on BET.

== Plot ==
Set in Atlanta, Georgia, this show follows four single, beautiful African-American women: Andi Barnes (KJ Smith) an ambitious attorney, Danni King (Mignon Von) an abrasive airline supervisor, Karen Mott (Ebony Obsidian) a street-smart hair salon owner, and Sabrina Hollins (Novi Brown), a stylish yet reserved bank teller, who bond over shared experiences while also navigating their romantic, personal, and professional lives.

== Cast and characters ==
=== Main ===
- KJ Smith as Andrea "Andi" Barnes, a divorce attorney who gets in a relationship with a married man who never solves a case.
- Mignon Von as Daniella "Danni" King, an abrasive and young-at-heart airline supervisor.
- Ebony Obsidian as Karen Mott, a hair salon owner in a complicated relationship, as well as the love interest of a newly separated man. (seasons 1–9)
- Novi Brown as Sabrina Hollins, a bank supervisor who falls in love with a man whose sexuality she questions. (seasons 1–9)
- DeVale Ellis as Zac Taylor, Karen's ex and later, father of her child and Fatima's love interest and later, husband.
- Chido Nwokocha as Gary Marshall Borders, a married man who starts a relationship with Andi
- Brian Jordan Jr. as Maurice Webb, Sabrina's gay coworker and friend
- Kevin Walton as Aaron Carter, Karen's married love interest and later, father of her child, (seasons 1–6: recurring, season 7)
- Anthony Dalton as Calvin Rodney, Sabrina's love interest (seasons 1–6)
- Crystal Renee Hayslett as Fatima Wilson-Taylor, Andi's assistant and friend at the firm and Zac's love interest and later, wife (season 2–present; recurring season 1)
- Trinity Whiteside as Preston Horace, Danni's love interest (seasons 2–6; recurring season 1)
- Chris Warren as Hayden Moss, Fatima's colleague and one-time fling (season 5–present; recurring seasons 2–4)
- Angela Beyincé as Pamela "Pam" Malbrough, Karen's hair salon assistant (season 7-present; recurring seasons 1–6)
- Branden Wellington as Tony King, Danni's co-worker and love interest (season 7; recurring, season 6)
- Monti Washington as Rich, Sabrina's new love interest (season 7; recurring, season 6)
- Sean Sagar (season 6) & Devin Way (season 7) as Jordan Williams, Penelope's brother, Andi's new love interest and Gary's rival (season 7; recurring, season 6)
- Joi Symone as Tamara, Hayden's partner and Gary's lover (season 7; recurring, seasons 5–6)
- Tonya Pinkins as Marie Willis, Hayden's lover (season 7)
- David Lami Friebe as Trey, Karen and Pam's new love interest (season 8; recurring, season 7)
- Austin Scott as Robin, Andi's new love interest (season 8; recurring, seasons 1—8)

=== Recurring ===
- Jesse Lewis IV as Bootsy (season 2)
- Crystal-Lee Naomi as Jasmine Borders, Gary's wife who Andi represents before Jasmine learns about the affair with her husband (season 1; guest, seasons 2–3, 8)
- Michael King as Don Bellamy, Andi's former boss (season 1; guest, season 2)
- Madison McKinley as Fawn Carter, Aaron's wife (season 1)
- Keena Ferguson as Leslie Davenport, a private investigator (season 1)
- Tobias Truvillion as Morris Hollis, a criminal defense attorney (season 1)
- Shari Belafonte as Lisa Mott, Karen's mother (seasons 1-7)
- Sean Poolman as Paris Johnson, Andi's love interest (seasons 1–2)
- Skyh Alvester Black as Jacobi, Sabrina's love interest (seasons 2–3)
- Mackenro Alexander as Que, Maurice's fling, currently on the run for the robbery at the Brookhaven Bank (season 3–present)
- Dion Rome as El Fuego, Danni's former collegemate, who works as a male stripper at Club Eden. His real name is Alonzo Garcia (seasons 3–4)
- Tanya Chisholm as Jenna (season 4)
- Eva Marcille as Marilyn "Madam" DeVille, Fatima's cousin who helps Andi with Sabrina's legal troubles, and the owner of Club Eden (season 5)
- Jason Weaver as Brian (season 6)
- Heather B. as Cheryl (season 6)
- Sal Stowers as Penelope Williams, Jordan's sister and Gary's pregnant mistress (seasons 6–7)
- Sebrina Purcell as Sgt Tiffany Hamilton, Tony's ex wife and Danni's main rival (season 7)
- Amani Ariel Diggs as Breana, Tony’s daughter and constant troublemaker (season 7)
- Nzinga Imani as Angela, Fatima's friend (season 5–present)
- Jasmin Brown as Deja, Fatima and Madam's rival (season 5–present)
- Shamaarke Purcell as Damany, Sabrina's friend (season 7)
- Sullivan Jones as Dr. Vaughn, Karen's doctor & Andi's new love interest (season 9)
- Duby Maduegbunam as Chaz Duncan, Fatima's new friend & Zac's new rival (season 9)
- Darone Okolie as Roc, Danni's cousin & Sabrina's new love interest (season 9)
- Walnette Marie Santiago as Nia (season 9)

=== Crossovers ===
Bruh: KJ Smith reprised her role of Andrea "Andi" Barnes on the BET+ comedy series, Bruh (another series created by Tyler Perry). Andi made brief appearances with her work partner Mike Alexander, whom he and three other men are the central characters of that series.

All the Queen's Men: Dion Rome guest appeared as exotic dancer El Fuego, (a character from the BET+ drama series All the Queens Men created by Christian Keyes and produced by Tyler Perry Studios) and became a recurring character in a minor role on Sistas in seasons 3 & 4. Eva Marcille guest starred in season 5 as Madam, the owner of Club Eden.

== Episodes ==
Season	Episodes		Originally released	
Season	Episodes		First released	Last released
1	25	9	October 23, 2019	December 18, 2019
1	25	16	January 8, 2020	April 29, 2020
2	22	12	October 14, 2020	December 23, 2020
2	22	10	January 27, 2021	March 31, 2021
3	22	11	June 9, 2021	August 18, 2021
3	22	11	October 13, 2021	December 22, 2021
4	22	11	January 5, 2022	March 16, 2022
4	22	11	June 1, 2022	August 10, 2022
5	22	11	October 12, 2022	December 21, 2022
5	22	11	January 4, 2023	March 15, 2023
6	22	11	May 31, 2023	August 9, 2023
6	22	11	October 18, 2023	December 27, 2023
7	22	11	January 3, 2024	March 13, 2024
7	22	11	May 29, 2024	August 7, 2024
8	22		October 16, 2024	March 12, 2025
9	22		July 16, 2025	December 17, 2025
10	22	11	January 7, 2026	March 18, 2026
10	22	11	October 7, 2026	December 16, 2026

=== Season 1 (2019–20) ===
No. overall	No. in season	Title	Directed by	Written by	Original release date	U.S. viewers (millions)
Part 1
1	1	"Pilot"	Tyler Perry	Tyler Perry	October 23, 2019	0.89
2	2	"Mixed Signal"	Tyler Perry	Tyler Perry	October 30, 2019	0.82
3	3	"A Woman with No Soul"	Tyler Perry	Tyler Perry	November 6, 2019	0.70
4	4	"New Stories"	Tyler Perry	Tyler Perry	November 13, 2019	0.85
5	5	"One Day at a Time"	Tyler Perry	Tyler Perry	November 20, 2019	0.82
6	6	"No Judgement"	Tyler Perry	Tyler Perry	November 27, 2019	0.87
7	7	"Boy Bye"	Tyler Perry	Tyler Perry	December 4, 2019	0.91
8	8	"Old Faithful"	Tyler Perry	Tyler Perry	December 11, 2019	0.85
9	9	"Acceptance"	Tyler Perry	Tyler Perry	December 18, 2019	0.77
Part 2
10	10	"Revelations"	Tyler Perry	Tyler Perry	January 8, 2020	0.83
11	11	"The Sister Circle"	Tyler Perry	Tyler Perry	January 15, 2020	0.99
12	12	"All I Got"	Tyler Perry	Tyler Perry	January 22, 2020	1.02
13	13	"In Front of Me"	Tyler Perry	Tyler Perry	January 29, 2020	1.02
14	14	"To Be Free"	Tyler Perry	Tyler Perry	February 5, 2020	0.96
15	15	"Too Much Glass"	Tyler Perry	Tyler Perry	February 12, 2020	1.02
16	16	"The Firm"	Tyler Perry	Tyler Perry	February 19, 2020	0.96
17	17	"The Trojan Horse"	Tyler Perry	Tyler Perry	February 26, 2020	0.85
18	18	"Bugaboo"	Tyler Perry	Tyler Perry	March 4, 2020	0.89
19	19	"Give Me the Night"	Tyler Perry	Tyler Perry	March 11, 2020	0.92
20	20	"A Chance to Love"	Tyler Perry	Tyler Perry	March 18, 2020	0.99
21	21	"From the Balcony"	Tyler Perry	Tyler Perry	March 25, 2020	1.05
22	22	"The Yellow Dress"	Tyler Perry	Tyler Perry	April 1, 2020	0.98
23	23	"Home For a Queen"	Tyler Perry	Tyler Perry	April 8, 2020	0.94
24	24	"A Bad Feeling"	Tyler Perry	Tyler Perry	April 15, 2020	0.94
25	25	"The Long Road"	Tyler Perry	Tyler Perry	April 29, 2020	0.99

=== Season 2 (2020–21) ===
No. overall	No. in season	Title	Directed by	Written by	Original release date	U.S. viewers (millions)
Part 1
26	1	"The Lonely Road"	Tyler Perry	Tyler Perry	October 14, 2020	1.02
27	2	"High Crimes"	Tyler Perry	Tyler Perry	October 14, 2020	0.98
28	3	"It's All About Pacing"	Tyler Perry	Tyler Perry	October 21, 2020	0.90
29	4	"Trying To Stay Open"	Tyler Perry	Billy Sam	October 28, 2020	0.88
30	5	"Up In Flames"	Tyler Perry	Tyler Perry	November 4, 2020	0.86
31	6	"That Look"	Tyler Perry	Tyler Perry	November 11, 2020	0.80
32	7	"Complications"	Tyler Perry	Tyler Perry	November 18, 2020	0.87
33	8	"Moving On"	Tyler Perry	Tyler Perry	November 25, 2020	0.82
34	9	"When I Get Home"	Tyler Perry	Tyler Perry	December 2, 2020	1.01
35	10	"The Encounter"	Tyler Perry	Tyler Perry	December 9, 2020	1.02
36	11	"The Hot Stove"	Tyler Perry	Tyler Perry	December 16, 2020	1.04
37	12	"Thinking of You"	Tyler Perry	Tyler Perry	December 23, 2020	1.08
Part 2
38	13	"Let It Be"	Tyler Perry	Tyler Perry	January 27, 2021	1.03
39	14	"Just for Me"	Tyler Perry	Tyler Perry	February 3, 2021	0.85
40	15	"A Tough Decision"	Tyler Perry	Tyler Perry	February 10, 2021	0.83
41	16	"Missing What You Never Had"	Tyler Perry	Tyler Perry	February 17, 2021	0.89
42	17	"Addicted"	Tyler Perry	Tyler Perry	February 24, 2021	0.85
43	18	"When it's Midnight"	Tyler Perry	Tyler Perry	March 3, 2021	0.90
44	19	"Severing All Ties"	Tyler Perry	Tyler Perry	March 10, 2021	0.92
45	20	"Catch Fade"	Tyler Perry	Tyler Perry	March 17, 2021	1.00
46	21	"Where the Heart Is"	Tyler Perry	Tyler Perry	March 24, 2021	0.94
47	22	"In the Shadows"	Tyler Perry	Tyler Perry	March 31, 2021	0.84

=== Season 3 (2021) ===
No. overall	No. in season	Title	Directed by	Written by	Original release date	U.S. viewers (millions)
Part 1
48	1	"When You're Confused"	Tyler Perry	Tyler Perry	June 9, 2021	0.96
49	2	"Acting Normal"	Tyler Perry	Tyler Perry	June 16, 2021	0.85
50	3	"The Gift of Goodbye"	Tyler Perry	Tyler Perry	June 23, 2021	0.89
51	4	"Just a Talk"	Tyler Perry	Tyler Perry	June 30, 2021	0.90
52	5	"Being a Boy"	Tyler Perry	Tyler Perry	July 7, 2021	1.00
53	6	"The Chase"	Tyler Perry	Tyler Perry	July 14, 2021	0.88
54	7	"Protecting Myself"	Tyler Perry	Tyler Perry	July 21, 2021	0.89
55	8	"Little White Lies"	Tyler Perry	Tyler Perry	July 28, 2021	0.97
56	9	"Complicated Situations"	Tyler Perry	Tyler Perry	August 4, 2021	0.89
57	10	"Run Tell That"	Tyler Perry	Tyler Perry	August 11, 2021	1.00
58	11	"Unlock It"	Tyler Perry	Tyler Perry	August 18, 2021	1.12
Part 2
59	12	"The Dollar Store"	Tyler Perry	Tyler Perry	October 13, 2021	0.96
60	13	"Water Under the Bridge"	Tyler Perry	Tyler Perry	October 20, 2021	0.90
61	14	"One Word Answers"	Tyler Perry	Tyler Perry	October 27, 2021	1.03
62	15	"Unknown Caller"	Tyler Perry	Tyler Perry	November 3, 2021	0.97
63	16	"At Seven"	Tyler Perry	Tyler Perry	November 10, 2021	0.83
64	17	"Burning Taboo"	Tyler Perry	Tyler Perry	November 17, 2021	0.95
65	18	"From A Woman"	Tyler Perry	Tyler Perry	November 24, 2021	0.85
66	19	"The Wild Card"	Tyler Perry	Tyler Perry	December 1, 2021	1.05
67	20	"We Got Time"	Tyler Perry	Tyler Perry	December 8, 2021	1.01
68	21	"Curve Balls"	Tyler Perry	Tyler Perry	December 15, 2021	1.05
69	22	"A Woman's Work"	Tyler Perry	Tyler Perry	December 22, 2021	1.05

=== Season 4 (2022) ===
No. overall	No. in season	Title	Directed by	Written by	Original release date	U.S. viewers (millions)
Part 1
70	1	"A Brick Wall"	Tyler Perry	Tyler Perry	January 5, 2022	0.94
71	2	"Still Water Runs Deep"	Tyler Perry	Tyler Perry	January 12, 2022	1.04
72	3	"Pleasantries"	Tyler Perry	Tyler Perry	January 19, 2022	1.00
73	4	"The Night Game"	Tyler Perry	Tyler Perry	January 26, 2022	1.03
74	5	"Life, Soul, and Heart"	Tyler Perry	Tyler Perry	February 2, 2022	1.10
75	6	"Hard To Get"	Tyler Perry	Tyler Perry	February 9, 2022	1.00
76	7	"Moving On Up"	Tyler Perry	Tyler Perry	February 16, 2022	1.02
77	8	"The Sister"	Tyler Perry	Tyler Perry	February 23, 2022	1.05
78	9	"Counter Punch"	Tyler Perry	Tyler Perry	March 2, 2022	0.98
79	10	"Our Favorite Places"	Tyler Perry	Tyler Perry	March 9, 2022	0.99
80	11	"Fine Wine"	Tyler Perry	Tyler Perry	March 16, 2022	0.94
Part 2
81	12	"Goodbye At The Door"	Tyler Perry	Tyler Perry	June 1, 2022	0.89
82	13	"Shaking in the Rain"	Tyler Perry	Tyler Perry	June 8, 2022	0.78
83	14	"Money Is King"	Tyler Perry	Tyler Perry	June 15, 2022	0.96
84	15	"We Know Enough"	Tyler Perry	Tyler Perry	June 22, 2022	0.96
85	16	"Look Closely"	Tyler Perry	Tyler Perry	June 29, 2022	0.99
86	17	"Some Sort Of Woman"	Tyler Perry	Tyler Perry	July 6, 2022	0.95
87	18	"Enemy of Mine"	Tyler Perry	Tyler Perry	July 13, 2022	1.03
88	19	"Benefit of the Doubt"	Tyler Perry	Tyler Perry	July 20, 2022	0.96
89	20	"Inside and Out"	Tyler Perry	Tyler Perry	July 27, 2022	1.01
90	21	"Moving on Out"	Tyler Perry	Tyler Perry	August 3, 2022	1.00
91	22	"Make Him Great"	Tyler Perry	Tyler Perry	August 10, 2022	0.95

=== Season 5 (2022–23) ===
No. overall	No. in season	Title	Directed by	Written by	Original release date	U.S. viewers (millions)
Part 1
92	1	"Pain and Suffering"	Tyler Perry	Tyler Perry	October 12, 2022	0.91
93	2	"My Boyfriend's Back"	Tyler Perry	Tyler Perry	October 19, 2022	0.92
94	3	"No Stress"	Tyler Perry	Tyler Perry	October 26, 2022	0.99
95	4	"The Letter"	Tyler Perry	Tyler Perry	November 2, 2022	0.95
96	5	"It's All About Who You Know"	Tyler Perry	Tyler Perry	November 9, 2022	1.01
97	6	"Keep It One Hundred"	Tyler Perry	Tyler Perry	November 16, 2022	0.98
98	7	"Ego Trip"	Tyler Perry	Tyler Perry	November 23, 2022	0.98
99	8	"Pushed to the Limit"	Tyler Perry	Tyler Perry	November 30, 2022	1.00
100	9	"Pursuit for Truth"	Tyler Perry	Tyler Perry	December 7, 2022	1.03
101	10	"Discretion Is Key"	Tyler Perry	Tyler Perry	December 14, 2022	0.96
102	11	"Dead to Rights"	Tyler Perry	Tyler Perry	December 21, 2022	1.00
Part 2
103	12	"Backlash"	Tyler Perry	Tyler Perry	January 4, 2023	1.01
104	13	"Feeling the Heat"	Tyler Perry	Tyler Perry	January 11, 2023	0.99
105	14	"Fair Game"	Tyler Perry	Tyler Perry	January 18, 2023	0.99
106	15	"Two Can Play That Game"	Tyler Perry	Tyler Perry	January 25, 2023	1.07
107	16	"Picture Perfect"	Tyler Perry	Tyler Perry	February 1, 2023	1.03
108	17	"Looks Are Deceiving"	Tyler Perry	Tyler Perry	February 8, 2023	0.96
109	18	"Friends Are Lovers"	Tyler Perry	Tyler Perry	February 15, 2023	0.89
110	19	"Truth Hurts"	Tyler Perry	Tyler Perry	February 22, 2023	0.96
111	20	"What Goes Around"	Tyler Perry	Tyler Perry	March 1, 2023	1.00
112	21	"A Vicious Cycle"	Tyler Perry	Tyler Perry	March 8, 2023	1.04
113	22	"Too Little, Too Late"	Tyler Perry	Tyler Perry	March 15, 2023	0.96

=== Season 6 (2023) ===
No. overall	No. in season	Title	Directed by	Written by	Original release date	U.S. viewers (millions)
Part 1
114	1	"Straight No Chaser"	Armani Ortiz	Tyler Perry	May 31, 2023	0.98
115	2	"Full Circle Moments"	Armani Ortiz	Tyler Perry	June 7, 2023	0.81
116	3	"Fanning the Flames"	Armani Ortiz	Tyler Perry	June 14, 2023	1.01
117	4	"Face the Fire"	Armani Ortiz	Tyler Perry	June 21, 2023	0.98
118	5	"Better Safe Than Sorry"	Armani Ortiz	Tyler Perry	June 28, 2023	0.94
119	6	"Mending Fences"	Armani Ortiz	Tyler Perry	July 5, 2023	0.92
120	7	"Ordinary Pain"	Armani Ortiz	Tyler Perry	July 12, 2023	0.94
121	8	"Uneven Playing Field"	Armani Ortiz	Tyler Perry	July 19, 2023	0.93
122	9	"True Colors"	Armani Ortiz	Tyler Perry	July 26, 2023	1.06
123	10	"The Aftermath"	Armani Ortiz	Tyler Perry	August 2, 2023	1.03
124	11	"No Turning Back"	Armani Ortiz	Tyler Perry	August 9, 2023	1.08
Part 2
125	12	"Daydreams"	Matt Alves	Tyler Perry	October 18, 2023	1.06
126	13	"Truth Is"	Matt Alves	Tyler Perry	October 25, 2023	1.04
127	14	"Something New"	Matt Alves	Tyler Perry	November 1, 2023	0.98
128	15	"Too Close To Home"	Matt Alves	Tyler Perry	November 8, 2023	0.89
129	16	"Relentless Pursuit"	Matt Alves	Tyler Perry	November 15, 2023	0.92
130	17	"Taste of Freedom"	Matt Alves	Tyler Perry	November 22, 2023	0.82
131	18	"From the Blindside"	Matt Alves	Tyler Perry	November 29, 2023	0.97
132	19	"Dear Karma"	Matt Alves	Tyler Perry	December 6, 2023	0.94
133	20	"The Last Laugh"	Matt Alves	Tyler Perry	December 13, 2023	0.95
134	21	"Lose to Win"	Matt Alves	Tyler Perry	December 20, 2023	0.99
135	22	"Beautiful Lies"	Matt Alves	Tyler Perry	December 27, 2023	1.05

=== Season 7 (2024) ===
No. overall	No. in season	Title	Directed by	Written by	Original release date	U.S. viewers (millions)
Part 1
136	1	"New Beginnings"	Armani Ortiz	Jamey Giddens	January 3, 2024	1.24
137	2	"Drunk in Love"	Armani Ortiz	Kourtney Richard	January 10, 2024	1.01
138	3	"Grand Openings and Closings"	Armani Ortiz	Lucien Christian Adderley & Richard "Byrd" Wilson	January 17, 2024	1.13
139	4	"Death Becomes Them"	Armani Ortiz	Lucien Christian Adderley & Richard "Byrd" Wilson	January 24, 2024	1.00
140	5	"Hanging in the Balance"	Armani Ortiz	April "A.P." Powell	January 31, 2024	0.86
141	6	"Pretty Hurts"	Armani Ortiz	Maggie Bush	February 7, 2024	0.89
142	7	"It's Giving Scandal"	Armani Ortiz	Kourtney Richard	February 14, 2024	0.96
143	8	"Pens and Needles"	Armani Ortiz	Lucien Christian Adderley & Richard "Byrd" Wilson	February 21, 2024	0.83
144	9	"Threes a Crowd"	Armani Ortiz	April "A.P." Powell	February 28, 2024	0.82
145	10	"The Good Fight"	Armani Ortiz	Maggie Bush	March 6, 2024	0.95
146	11	"Gone Girl"	Armani Ortiz	Jamey Giddens	March 13, 2024	1.09
Part 2
147	12	"Next Level"	Armani Ortiz	April "A.P." Powell	May 29, 2024	0.87
148	13	"Who Can I Run To"	Armani Ortiz	Lucien Christian Adderley & Richard "Byrd" Wilson	June 5, 2024	0.95
149	14	"All for the D"	Armani Ortiz	Kourtney Richard	June 12, 2024	0.74
150	15	"Love Means Never Having to Say You're Sorry"	Armani Ortiz	Jamey Giddens	June 19, 2024	0.74
151	16	"Close to You"	Armani Ortiz	Maggie Bush	June 26, 2024	0.80
152	17	"Walk of Shame"	Armani Ortiz	Kourtney Richard	July 3, 2024	0.84
153	18	"Where Do Broken Hearts Go?"	Armani Ortiz	Teleplay by : Jamey Giddens; Story by : Tre'Mond "TK" Kearse	July 10, 2024	0.87
154	19	"It Takes a Village"	Armani Ortiz	Lucien Christian Adderley & Richard "Byrd" Wilson	July 17, 2024	0.92
155	20	"Beautiful Liar"	Armani Ortiz	Kourtney Richard	July 24, 2024	0.83
156	21	"Penultimate"	Armani Ortiz	Jamey Giddens	July 31, 2024	0.80
157	22	"Had It Coming"	Armani Ortiz	Lucien Christian Adderley & Richard "Byrd" Wilson	August 7, 2024	0.83

=== Season 8 (2024–25) ===
No. overall	No. in season	Title	Directed by	Written by	Original release date	U.S. viewers (millions)
158	1	"Dead Man Walking"	Armani Ortiz	Jamey Giddens	October 16, 2024	0.88
159	2	"Tea Time"	Armani Ortiz	Chrystal Ellzy	October 23, 2024	0.73
160	3	"Up Close and Personal"	Armani Ortiz	Yolanda E. Lawrence	October 30, 2024	0.76
161	4	"Showin' Out"	Armani Ortiz	Lucien Christian Adderley & Richard "Byrd" Wilson	November 6, 2024	0.71
162	5	"Wounded Eros"	Armani Ortiz	Maggie Bush	November 13, 2024	0.80
163	6	"Web of Deceit"	Armani Ortiz	April "A.P." Powell	November 20, 2024	0.74
164	7	"Game Recognizes Game"	Armani Ortiz	Story by : Jamey Giddens; Teleplay by : Tre'Mond "TK" Kearse	November 27, 2024	0.64
165	8	"Appearances"	Armani Ortiz	Yolanda E. Lawrence	December 4, 2024	N/A
166	9	"Missing Pieces"	Armani Ortiz	April "A.P." Powell	December 11, 2024	N/A
167	10	"Forget Me Not"	Armani Ortiz	Maggie Bush	December 18, 2024	N/A
168	11	"Breathe"	Armani Ortiz	Lucien Christian Adderley & Richard "Byrd" Wilson	December 18, 2024	N/A
169	12	"Pull the Trigger"	Armani Ortiz	Maggie Bush	January 1, 2025	N/A
170	13	"Aftershocks"	Armani Ortiz	Chrystal Ellzy	January 8, 2025	N/A
171	14	"Knock Knock"	Armani Ortiz	Lucien Christian Adderley & Richard "Byrd" Wilson	January 15, 2025	N/A
172	15	"Tectonic Shifts"	Armani Ortiz	Story by : Yolanda E. Lawrence; Teleplay by : Jamey Giddens	January 22, 2025	N/A
173	16	"Choose You"	Armani Ortiz	April "A.P." Powell	January 29, 2025	N/A
174	17	"Call Me By His Name"	Armani Ortiz	Yolanda E. Lawrence	February 5, 2025	N/A
175	18	"War to Roses"	Armani Ortiz	Maggie Bush & Tre'Mond "TK" Kearse	February 12, 2025	N/A
176	19	"Knuckin' and Buckin'"	Armani Ortiz	Lucien Christian Adderley & Richard "Byrd" Wilson	February 19, 2025	N/A
177	20	"Boss Lady"	Armani Ortiz	April "A.P." Powell	February 26, 2025	N/A
178	21	"London Bridges"	Armani Ortiz	Teleplay by : Jamey Giddens; Story by : Chrystal Ellzy	March 5, 2025	N/A
178	22	"Before You Walk Out of My Life"	Armani Ortiz	Lucien Christian Adderley & Richard "Byrd" Wilson	March 12, 2025	N/A

=== Season 9 (2025) ===
No. overall	No. in season	Title	Directed by	Written by	Original release date	U.S. viewers (millions)
179	1	"No Time to Wait"	Armani Ortiz	Kourtney Richard	July 16, 2025	N/A
180	2	"Do No Harm"	Armani Ortiz	Courtney Glaudé	July 23, 2025	N/A
181	3	"Having Faith"	Armani Ortiz	Lucien Christian Adderley & Richard "Byrd" Wilson	July 30, 2025	N/A
182	4	"One Is The Loneliest Number"	Armani Ortiz	Chrystal Ellzy	August 6, 2025	N/A
183	5	"Heavy Is The Crown"	Armani Ortiz	Maggie Bush	August 13, 2025	N/A
184	6	"New Normal"	Armani Ortiz	April "A.P." Powell	August 20, 2025	N/A
185	7	"Cutting Ties"	Armani Ortiz	Courtney Glaudé	August 27, 2025	N/A
186	8	"Truth Is"	Armani Ortiz	Maggie Bush	September 3, 2025	N/A
187	9	"Return To Sender"	Armani Ortiz	Lucien Christian Adderley & Richard "Byrd" Wilson	September 10, 2025	N/A
188	10	"Back Shot"	Armani Ortiz	April "A.P." Powell	September 17, 2025	N/A
189	11	"Surprise, Surprise"	Armani Ortiz	Kourtney Richard	September 24, 2025	N/A
190	12	"Search Party"	Armani Ortiz	Kourtney Richard	October 8, 2025	0.60
191	13	"On My Own"	Armani Ortiz	Maggie Bush	October 15, 2025	0.54
192	14	"Pull Up On Me!"	Armani Ortiz	Lucien Christian Adderley & Richard "Byrd" Wilson	October 22, 2025	0.55
193	15	"Family Affair"	Armani Ortiz	Courtney Glaudé	October 29, 2025	N/A
194	16	"Unbreakable Bond"	Armani Ortiz	April "A.P." Powell	November 5, 2025	N/A
195	17	"The Ties That Bind"	Armani Ortiz	Chrystal Ellzy	November 12, 2025	N/A
196	18	"Diamonds Are Forever"	Armani Ortiz	Kourtney Richard	November 19, 2025	N/A
197	19	"Taking It All Back"	Armani Ortiz	Lucien Christian Adderley & Richard "Byrd" Wilson	November 26, 2025	N/A
198	20	"Bon Voyage"	Armani Ortiz	April "A.P." Powell & Maggie Bush	December 3, 2025	N/A
199	21	"Girls Just Wanna Have Fun"	Armani Ortiz	Lucien Christian Adderley & Richard "Byrd" Wilson	December 10, 2025	N/A
200	22	"The Hangover"	Armani Ortiz	Kourtney Richard	December 17, 2025	N/A

=== Season 10 (2026) ===
No. overall	No. in season	Title	Directed by	Written by	Original release date	U.S. viewers (millions)
Part 1
201	1	"Next of Kin"	Armani Ortiz	Courtney Glaudé	January 7, 2026	N/A
202	2	"Guilty"	Armani Ortiz	Courtney Glaudé	January 14, 2026	N/A
203	3	"With Or Without You"	Armani Ortiz	Courtney Glaudé	January 21, 2026	N/A
204	4	"Safety Blanket"	Armani Ortiz	Courtney Glaudé	January 28, 2026	N/A
205	5	"Misery Loves Company"	Armani Ortiz	Courtney Glaudé	February 4, 2026	N/A
206	6	"Anything But Shy"	Armani Ortiz	Courtney Glaudé	February 11, 2026	N/A
207	7	"Leaving to Stay"	Armani Ortiz	Courtney Glaudé	February 18, 2026	N/A
208	8	"Laid Best Plans"	Armani Ortiz	Courtney Glaudé	February 25, 2026	N/A
209	9	"Visiting Ours"	Armani Ortiz	Courtney Glaudé	March 4, 2026	N/A
210	10	"Big As Us"	Armani Ortiz	Courtney Glaudé	March 11, 2026	N/A
211	11	"Three Sided Circle"	Armani Ortiz	Courtney Glaudé	March 18, 2026	N/A
Part 2
212	12	"Hello Goodbye"	Armani Ortiz	Courtney Glaudé	October 7, 2026	N/A
213	13	"Long Row To Hoe"	Armani Ortiz	Courtney Glaudé	October 14, 2026	TBD
214	14	"Shoulda Woulda Coulda"	TBA	TBA	October 21, 2026	TBD
215	15	"Ripples Wake Waves"	TBA	TBA	October 28, 2026	TBD
216	16	"Serve and Protect"	TBA	TBA	November 4, 2026	TBD
217	17	"In His Eyes"	TBA	TBA	November 11, 2026	TBD

== Production ==
On May 12, 2020, BET renewed the series for a second season, with Perry announcing that production would start on July 8, 2020. The second season premiered on October 14, 2020. It was the first scripted, primetime television series in the U.S. to complete production under COVID-19 pandemic safety protocols, with Tyler Perry Studios employing a bio-secure bubble strategy.

On January 19, 2021, BET renewed the series for a third season. The third season premiered on June 9, 2021.

On October 20, 2021, BET renewed the series for a fourth season which premiered on January 5, 2022.

On March 22, 2022, BET renewed the series for a fifth season, which premiered on October 12, 2022.

On April 26, 2023, BET renewed the series for a sixth season, which premiered on May 31, 2023.

On December 31, 2023, BET renewed the series for a seventh season, which premiered on January 3, 2024.

On April 16, 2024, BET renewed the series for an eighth season, which premiered on October 16, 2024.

Season 9 premiered on July 16, 2025.

On December 17, 2025, BET renewed the series for a landmark 10th season, which premiered on January 7, 2026.

== Spin-offs ==
=== Zatima ===
On December 8, 2021, it was announced that BET+ ordered Zatima, a spin-off starring Devale Ellis as Zac Taylor and Crystal Renee Hayslett as Fatima Wilson. The series premiered on September 22, 2022.

=== Divorced Sistas ===
On May 5, 2025, it was announced that BET+ ordered Divorced Sistas, a spin-off starring LeToya Luckett as Rasheda, Khadeen Indréa as Geneva, Porscha Coleman as Naomi, Briana Price as Tiffany, and Jennifer Sears as Bridgette. Premiering on June 9, 2025, the series follows five close friends as they navigate life, love and the challenges that come with divorce, marriage and dating.
