= Something from Tiffany's =

2022 film by Daryl Wein

- Official release poster
- Directed by: Daryl Wein
- Screenplay by: Tamara Chestna
- Based on: Something from Tiffany's by Melissa Hill
- Produced by: Lauren Neustadter; Reese Witherspoon
- Starring: Zoey Deutch; Kendrick Sampson; Ray Nicholson; Shay Mitchell
- Cinematography: Bryce Fortner
- Edited by: Casey Brooks
- Music by: Jay Lifton; Ryan Miller
- Production company: Hello Sunshine
- Distributed by: Amazon Studios
- Release date: December 9, 2022
- Running time: 87 minutes
- Country: United States
- Language: English

Something from Tiffany's is a 2022 American Christmas romantic comedy film directed by Daryl Wein, from a screenplay by Tamara Chestna, starring Zoey Deutch, Kendrick Sampson, Ray Nicholson, and Shay Mitchell. It is based on the novel of the same name by Melissa Hill.

Rachel's life gets upended when she mistakenly believes her boyfriend Gary got her an engagement ring, when his gift was accidentally switched with someone else's, inadvertently leading her to the person she is meant to be with.

Something from Tiffany's was released on December 9, 2022, by Amazon Studios via Prime Video.

== Plot ==
After her boyfriend Gary is hit by a car outside a Tiffany's store on their anniversary, Rachel finds an engagement ring box in his belongings and assumes he wants to propose. Unbeknownst to her, the ring was actually purchased by Ethan, one of the men who performed first aid, and Ethan unknowingly left with the box containing the Tiffany earrings Gary bought for Rachel.

The next morning, his daughter Daisy insists they go to check on Gary in the hospital. Rachel introduces herself and invites him to her bakery as a thank-you for helping her boyfriend. When the shop suddenly gets busy, Ethan steps in to help her manage the rush. The two get on well, walking along the East River in Manhattan afterward to get to know each other.

At Christmas, both men present their Tiffany gifts. When Ethan realizes the mix-up, he says nothing, as his girlfriend Vanessa likes the earrings. Gary, confused by his amnesia, supposes he must have bought the ring, so he proposes to Rachel. Although she was unsure about the idea upon finding the box days ago, she says yes.

The next day, Ethan tries to meet Gary to retrieve the ring so he can propose to Vanessa. Rachel is there, wearing her new ring. The two spend the evening together, though he eventually leaves abruptly.

The following day, Gary refuses to return the ring when Ethan confronts him. When Rachel goes to Tiffany's to get advice on how to clean her ring, the saleswoman says she made the sale and describes the man and daughter who bought it. Rachel recognizes Ethan from the description and understands what must have happened.

Confronted by Rachel, Gary admits he suspected the ring was not his, but realized he wanted to marry her, so he went through with the proposal—and he still wants to marry her. Rachel meets Ethan at her bakery and tells him Gary will return the ring.

On New Year's Eve, one of Gary's friends reveals that when Rachel met Gary, he was on his way to a hook-up. She breaks up with him. Ethan and Vanessa simultaneously arrive. Vanessa is upset to learn that Ethan has been lying to her. During their argument, they realize they have different plans for the future, and also decide to break up.

Daisy orchestrates a romantic way for Ethan and Rachel to meet by the East River, where they kiss, starting a relationship. A year later at Christmas Eve, Ethan proposes to her with the ring she accidentally received a year earlier.

== Cast ==
- Zoey Deutch as Rachel Meyer
- Kendrick Sampson as Ethan Greene
- Ray Nicholson as Gary Wilson
- Shay Mitchell as Vanessa
- Leah Jeffries as Daisy Greene, Ethan's daughter
- Jojo T. Gibbs as Terri Blake
- Javicia Leslie as Sophia
- Chido Nwokocha as Brian Harrison
- Rose Abdoo as Tiffany Saleswoman
- Michael Roark as David

== Production ==
On October 30, 2021, it was reported that Zoey Deutch would star in and be an executive producer on Something from Tiffany's, based on the novel of the same name by Melissa Hill. The film would be produced by Reese Witherspoon and Lauren Neustadter for Hello Sunshine, as a co-production with Amazon Studios. It would be Hello Sunshine's first film, and was adapted for the screen by Tamara Chestna.

In December 2021, it was reported that Kendrick Sampson, Ray Nicholson, Shay Mitchell, and Leah Jeffries had joined the cast. In February 2022, it was reported that Jojo T. Gibbs, Javicia Leslie, Chido Nwokocha, Stephanie Shepherd, and Michael Roark had been added to the cast.

Filming commenced in New York City in December 2021.

== Release and reception ==
The film was released on Prime Video on December 9, 2022.

On the review aggregator website Rotten Tomatoes, 72% of 36 critics' reviews are positive, with an average rating of 5.6/10. The website's consensus reads: "Tis the season for romantic misfortune, and there's still time to get Something from Tiffany's—a little box of derivative fun that bolsters a low-carat hand of comedy and good chemistry." On Metacritic, the film has a weighted average score of 46 out of 100, based on 10 critics, indicating "mixed or average reviews".
