= Perimeter (TV series) =

- Genre: Drama; Crime; Action; Romance; Soap Opera; Thriller
- Created by: Armani Ortiz
- Starring: Tatyana Ali; Donavan Christie, Jr.; Ava Mone't; Malcolm Xavier; Jalen Gilbert; West Montez; Jordan Coleman; Sharon Conley; Evan Gamble; Shawn Vaughn
- Country of origin: United States
- Original language: English
- No. of seasons: 1
- No. of episodes: 4

Production
- Executive producers: Armani Ortiz; Tyler Perry
- Producers: Asante White; Deancé Wyatt; Carmen K. Jones; Mark E. Swinton; Will Areu; Angi Bones
- Camera setup: Single-camera
- Production company: Tyler Perry Studios

Original release
- Network: BET+
- Release: February 29, 2024

Perimeter is an American period drama television series created by Armani Ortiz and executive produced by Tyler Perry. Set in Atlanta in the 1990s, the series centers around Paige Dawn (Ava Mone't), a promising sophomore student at Spelman College who falls in love with a drug dealer; her father, Councilman Robert Dawn (Donavan Christie Jr.), with political ambitions; and her mother, Connie (Tatyana Ali).

The series premiered on February 29, 2024, on BET+.

== Cast and characters ==
- Ava Mone't as Paige Dawn
- Malcolm Xavier as Malcolm
- West Montez as Romeo
- Jalen Gilbert as Jonathan
- Tatyana Ali as Connie Dawn
- Donavan Christie Jr. as Robert Dawn
- Jordan Coleman as Evelyn
- Sharon Conley as Lauren Thompson
- Evan Gamble as Nathan
- Shawn Vaughn as Justin

== Episodes ==
| No. | Title | Directed by | Written by | Original release date | BET air date | U.S. linear viewers (millions) |
|---|---|---|---|---|---|---|
| 1 | "To Whom It May Concern Part 1" | Armani Ortiz | Armani Ortiz | February 29, 2024 | April 8, 2025 | N/A |
| 2 | "To Whom It May Concern Part 2" | Armani Ortiz | Armani Ortiz | February 29, 2024 | April 15, 2025 | N/A |
| 3 | "Help Me Part 1" | Armani Ortiz | Armani Ortiz | February 29, 2024 | April 22, 2025 | N/A |
| 4 | "Help Me Part 2" | Armani Ortiz | Armani Ortiz | February 29, 2024 | April 29, 2025 | N/A |
