= The Oval (TV series) =

American television series (2019–present)

- Also known as: Tyler Perry's The Oval
- Genre: Soap opera; Political drama; Crime; Romance; Thriller; Mystery; Suspense
- Created by: Tyler Perry
- Written by: Tyler Perry (Seasons 1-6); Mark E. Swinton (Season 7)
- Directed by: Tyler Perry (Seasons 1-5); Armani Ortiz (Seasons 6-7)
- Starring: Ed Quinn; Kron Moore; Paige Hurd; Daniel Croix Henderson; Javon Johnson; Ptosha Storey; Vaughn W. Hebron; Teesha Renee; Lodric Collins; Ciera Payton; Taja V. Simpson; Walter Fauntleroy; Brad Benedict; Travis Cure; Matthew Law; Bill Barrett; Derek A. Dixon; Nick Barrotta; Kaye Singleton; Russell Thomas; Nelson Estevez; Chyna Layne
- Composers: Jay Weigel (seasons 1-6); Lance Trevino (season 7)
- Country of origin: United States
- Original language: English
- No. of seasons: 7
- No. of episodes: 157

Production
- Executive producers: Tyler Perry; Michelle Sneed (season 1)
- Producers: Mark E. Swinton; Tommy Watt (seasons 6-7); Will Areu (seasons 6-7); Angi Bones (seasons 6-7); Tony L. Strickland (seasons 6-7); Elon Johnson (season 7)
- Camera setup: Multiple camera
- Running time: 42 minutes
- Production company: Tyler Perry Studios

Original release
- Network: BET
- Release: October 23, 2019 – December 23, 2025
- Network: Paramount+
- Release: April 15, 2026

Related
- Ruthless

The Oval is an American political drama soap opera created, executive produced, written, and directed by Tyler Perry, which premiered on October 23, 2019, on BET. The series chronicles the lives of a family placed in the White House by people of power, while also highlighting the personal side and everyday lives of the staff who run its inner workings.

A spin-off, Ruthless, premiered on BET+ on March 19, 2020.

== Cast and characters ==
=== Main ===
- Ed Quinn as Hunter Franklin, the President of the United States
- Kron Moore as Victoria Franklin, the First Lady of the United States
- Paige Hurd as Gayle Franklin, Hunter and Victoria's daughter (main season 1; guest season 2)
- Daniel Croix Henderson as Jason Franklin, Hunter and Victoria's son
- Javon Johnson as Richard Hallsen, the White House Butler
- Ptosha Storey as Nancy Hallsen, the Butler's wife
- Vaughn W. Hebron as Bartholomew "Barry" Hallsen, Richard and Nancy's son (Seasons 1–4)
- Teesha Renee as Sharon Barry's former girlfriend and Kareem's former girlfriend
- Lodric Collins as Donald Winthrop, White House Chief of Staff
- Ciera Payton as Lilly Winthrop, Donald's wife and a fashion designer
- Taja V. Simpson as Priscilla Owens, White House residence staff supervisor
- Walter Fauntleroy as Sam Owens, Secret Service agent and Priscilla's Husband
- Brad Benedict as Kyle Flint, Secret Service agent
- Travis Cure as Bobby Cayden, Lilly's friend
- Matthew Law as Kareem Richardson, local pharmacy owner (main seasons 1–4; recurring season 5–present)
- Bill Barrett as Max Carter, Secret Service agent (main season 2–present; recurring season 1)
- Derek A. Dixon as Dale, a worker at Kareem's pharmacy and friend of Sharon (seasons 2–6)
- Nick Barrotta as Allan Maxwell, Donald's assistant and Ellie's ex-boyfriend (main season 3–present; recurring season 1–2)
- Kaye Singleton as Simone Winter, the Second lady (season 3–present)
- Russell Thomas as Eli Winter, the Vice President of the United States (season 3–present)
- Nelson Estevez as Alonzo White, Secret Service agent
- Chyna Layne as Dilva Prinn (season 7)

=== Recurring ===
- Melissa L. Williams as Ruth Truesdale/Denise Truesdale (season 1–2)
- Russell Charles Pitts as Picky/Leon, Gayle's boyfriend (season 1)
- Maurii Davenport as Lindsay Yuma, Secret service agent (season 1)
- Ashley Monique Harper as Jean Peterson, a White House maid (season 1)
- Yvonne Senat Jones as Tally, Ruth's friend (season 1)
- Natasha Ward as Ellie Lyles, the current White House press secretary (season 1–3)
- Gillian White as Diane Wilmont, the former White House press secretary (season 1–2)
- Janee Michelle as Maude, Victoria's mother (season 1–2)
- Donna Feldman as Dr. Meadows
- Ken Lawson as Officer Driver (season 5)
- Ariel D. King as Lena (season 5)

==== Ruthless crossover guest appearances ====
- Blue Kimble as Andrew (season 1)
- Lenny Thomas as Dikhan (season 1, 3, 5)
- Joshua Adeyeye as Manny (season 3–5)
- Matt Cedeño as 'The Highest' (season 4)
- Baadja-Lyne Odums as Elder Mother Marva (season 4)
- Colin McCalla as River (season 5)

== Episodes ==
Season	Episodes		Originally released		
Season	Episodes		First released	Last released	Network
1	25	12	October 23, 2019	January 22, 2020	BET
1	25	13	May 6, 2020	July 22, 2020	BET
2	22	13	February 16, 2021	May 11, 2021	BET
2	22	9	July 20, 2021	September 14, 2021	BET
3	22	11	October 12, 2021	December 21, 2021	BET
3	22	11	January 11, 2022	March 22, 2022	BET
4	22	11	October 11, 2022	December 20, 2022	BET
4	22	11	January 3, 2023	March 14, 2023	BET
5	22	11	October 17, 2023	December 26, 2023	BET
5	22	11	January 2, 2024	March 12, 2024	BET
6	22	11	January 7, 2025	March 18, 2025	BET
6	22	11	October 28, 2025	December 23, 2025	BET
7	22		April 15, 2026 (Note: Season 7 also aired weekly on BET from May 20 to September 30, 2026.)		Paramount+

=== Season 1 (2019–20) ===
No. overall	No. in season	Title	Directed by	Written by	Original release date	U.S viewers (millions)
Part 1
1	1	"Pilot"	Tyler Perry	Tyler Perry	October 23, 2019	1.01
2	2	"Unforgettable"	Tyler Perry	Tyler Perry	October 30, 2019	0.94
3	3	"Heat"	Tyler Perry	Tyler Perry	November 6, 2019	0.84
4	4	"Rats Can Smell Poison"	Tyler Perry	Tyler Perry	November 13, 2019	0.96
5	5	"Allies"	Tyler Perry	Tyler Perry	November 20, 2019	0.88
6	6	"Lab Rats"	Tyler Perry	Tyler Perry	November 27, 2019	0.95
7	7	"The Dark Sheep"	Tyler Perry	Tyler Perry	December 4, 2019	0.95
8	8	"Eye on the Sparrow"	Tyler Perry	Tyler Perry	December 11, 2019	1.03
9	9	"The Fish Bowl"	Tyler Perry	Tyler Perry	December 18, 2019	0.94
10	10	"Going Black"	Tyler Perry	Tyler Perry	January 8, 2020	0.93
11	11	"The United Front"	Tyler Perry	Tyler Perry	January 15, 2020	1.11
12	12	"Hidden Secrets"	Tyler Perry	Tyler Perry	January 22, 2020	1.11
Part 2
13	13	"Fear of God"	Tyler Perry	Tyler Perry	May 6, 2020	1.03
14	14	"One Time"	Tyler Perry	Tyler Perry	May 13, 2020	1.02
15	15	"Clock Work"	Tyler Perry	Tyler Perry	May 20, 2020	0.94
16	16	"The Dangerous Game"	Tyler Perry	Tyler Perry	May 27, 2020	1.03
17	17	"Five Families"	Tyler Perry	Tyler Perry	June 3, 2020	1.03
18	18	"Me and You"	Tyler Perry	Tyler Perry	June 10, 2020	1.09
19	19	"Clueless"	Tyler Perry	Tyler Perry	June 17, 2020	1.00
20	20	"Call of Duty"	Tyler Perry	Tyler Perry	June 24, 2020	0.88
21	21	"The Godfather"	Tyler Perry	Tyler Perry	July 1, 2020	0.88
22	22	"The Loving Parents"	Tyler Perry	Tyler Perry	July 8, 2020	0.99
23	23	"Unexpected Guest"	Tyler Perry	Tyler Perry	July 15, 2020	0.92
24	24	"Twenty-Four Hours"	Tyler Perry	Tyler Perry	July 22, 2020	1.00
25	25	"One of Us"	Tyler Perry	Tyler Perry	July 22, 2020	1.11

=== Season 2 (2021) ===
No. overall	No. in season	Title	Directed by	Written by	Original release date	U.S viewers (millions)
Part 1
26	1	"A Little Girl Talk"	Tyler Perry	Tyler Perry	February 16, 2021	1.00
27	2	"Natural Habitat"	Tyler Perry	Tyler Perry	February 23, 2021	0.79
28	3	"Wicked Things"	Tyler Perry	Tyler Perry	March 2, 2021	0.83
29	4	"The Fencer"	Tyler Perry	Tyler Perry	March 9, 2021	0.86
30	5	"A Stranger at Home"	Tyler Perry	Tyler Perry	March 16, 2021	0.78
31	6	"Malicious Intent"	Tyler Perry	Tyler Perry	March 23, 2021	0.90
32	7	"Hidden Secrets"	Tyler Perry	Tyler Perry	March 30, 2021	0.80
33	8	"Don't Believe Your Eyes"	Tyler Perry	Tyler Perry	April 6, 2021	0.76
34	9	"Political Junkie"	Tyler Perry	Tyler Perry	April 13, 2021	0.80
35	10	"The Master"	Tyler Perry	Tyler Perry	April 20, 2021	0.84
36	11	"Empty Your Bag"	Tyler Perry	Tyler Perry	April 27, 2021	0.95
37	12	"Misunderstood"	Tyler Perry	Tyler Perry	May 4, 2021	0.81
38	13	"Every Weekend"	Tyler Perry	Tyler Perry	May 11, 2021	0.89
Part 2
39	14	"The Target"	Tyler Perry	Tyler Perry	July 20, 2021	0.72
40	15	"Don't Move"	Tyler Perry	Tyler Perry	July 27, 2021	0.78
41	16	"Familiar Faces"	Tyler Perry	Tyler Perry	August 3, 2021	0.74
42	17	"Body Parts"	Tyler Perry	Tyler Perry	August 10, 2021	0.94
43	18	"Like a Boss"	Tyler Perry	Tyler Perry	August 17, 2021	0.89
44	19	"Nine Lives"	Tyler Perry	Tyler Perry	August 24, 2021	0.92
45	20	"The Skies Have Eyes"	Tyler Perry	Tyler Perry	August 31, 2021	0.84
46	21	"Powerful Hands"	Tyler Perry	Tyler Perry	September 7, 2021	0.93
47	22	"Doomsday"	Tyler Perry	Tyler Perry	September 14, 2021	0.97

=== Season 3 (2021–22) ===
No. overall	No. in season	Title	Directed by	Written by	Original release date	U.S viewers (millions)
Part 1
48	1	"An Eye for an Eye"	Tyler Perry	Tyler Perry	October 12, 2021	0.97
49	2	"Off Limits"	Tyler Perry	Tyler Perry	October 19, 2021	0.84
50	3	"The Mole"	Tyler Perry	Tyler Perry	October 26, 2021	1.01
51	4	"In Need of Protection"	Tyler Perry	Tyler Perry	November 2, 2021	0.85
52	5	"Behind Closed Doors"	Tyler Perry	Tyler Perry	November 9, 2021	0.86
53	6	"A Family Matter"	Tyler Perry	Tyler Perry	November 16, 2021	0.90
54	7	"Ho Patrol"	Tyler Perry	Tyler Perry	November 23, 2021	0.89
55	8	"One Rule"	Tyler Perry	Tyler Perry	November 30, 2021	0.99
56	9	"Glove Up"	Tyler Perry	Tyler Perry	December 7, 2021	0.97
57	10	"Checkmate"	Tyler Perry	Tyler Perry	December 14, 2021	1.03
58	11	"The Children"	Tyler Perry	Tyler Perry	December 21, 2021	0.96
Part 2
59	12	"The Dutiful Wife"	Tyler Perry	Tyler Perry	January 11, 2022	1.01
60	13	"Tragic Monologues"	Tyler Perry	Tyler Perry	January 18, 2022	1.05
61	14	"The Command Performance"	Tyler Perry	Tyler Perry	January 25, 2022	0.95
62	15	"Wicked"	Tyler Perry	Tyler Perry	February 1, 2022	0.99
63	16	"The Hornet's Nest"	Tyler Perry	Tyler Perry	February 8, 2022	0.97
64	17	"Get a Grip"	Tyler Perry	Tyler Perry	February 15, 2022	0.91
65	18	"Next to Impossible"	Tyler Perry	Tyler Perry	February 22, 2022	0.87
66	19	"Gathering Evidence"	Tyler Perry	Tyler Perry	March 1, 2022	0.78
67	20	"The Vendetta"	Tyler Perry	Tyler Perry	March 8, 2022	0.95
68	21	"Ugly Politics"	Tyler Perry	Tyler Perry	March 15, 2022	1.01
69	22	"Road Kill"	Tyler Perry	Tyler Perry	March 22, 2022	0.84

=== Season 4 (2022–23) ===
No. overall	No. in season	Title	Directed by	Written by	Original release date	U.S viewers (millions)
Part 1
70	1	"The Package"	Tyler Perry	Tyler Perry	October 11, 2022	0.70
71	2	"Black Stallion"	Tyler Perry	Tyler Perry	October 18, 2022	0.60
72	3	"Into the Woods"	Tyler Perry	Tyler Perry	October 25, 2022	0.74
73	4	"Wicked"	Tyler Perry	Tyler Perry	November 1, 2022	0.65
74	5	"Image, Power, and Money"	Tyler Perry	Tyler Perry	November 8, 2022	0.70
75	6	"Guns Blazing"	Tyler Perry	Tyler Perry	November 15, 2022	0.60
76	7	"Hook, Line, and Sinker"	Tyler Perry	Tyler Perry	November 22, 2022	0.66
77	8	"It's Over"	Tyler Perry	Tyler Perry	November 29, 2022	0.60
78	9	"Out of Line"	Tyler Perry	Tyler Perry	December 6, 2022	0.73
79	10	"Truth Be Told"	Tyler Perry	Tyler Perry	December 13, 2022	0.74
80	11	"What's Done in the Dark"	Tyler Perry	Tyler Perry	December 20, 2022	0.72
Part 2
81	12	"The Stories We Tell"	Tyler Perry	Tyler Perry	January 3, 2023	0.71
82	13	"Back Off"	Tyler Perry	Tyler Perry	January 10, 2023	0.69
83	14	"Know Your Place"	Tyler Perry	Tyler Perry	January 17, 2023	0.65
84	15	"Deception"	Tyler Perry	Tyler Perry	January 24, 2023	0.65
85	16	"Problem Diverted"	Tyler Perry	Tyler Perry	January 31, 2023	0.63
86	17	"Bridge Over Troubled Water"	Tyler Perry	Tyler Perry	February 7, 2023	0.71
87	18	"No Regrets"	Tyler Perry	Tyler Perry	February 14, 2023	0.70
88	19	"It's No Secret"	Tyler Perry	Tyler Perry	February 21, 2023	0.76
89	20	"The Point of No Return"	Tyler Perry	Tyler Perry	February 28, 2023	0.66
90	21	"Pins and Needles"	Tyler Perry	Tyler Perry	March 7, 2023	0.75
91	22	"The Last Strike"	Tyler Perry	Tyler Perry	March 14, 2023	0.73

=== Season 5 (2023–24) ===
No. overall	No. in season	Title	Directed by	Written by	Original release date	U.S viewers (millions)
Part 1
92	1	"Turning Tables"	Tyler Perry	Tyler Perry	October 17, 2023	0.67
93	2	"The Missing Link"	Tyler Perry	Tyler Perry	October 24, 2023	0.63
94	3	"Man Down"	Tyler Perry	Tyler Perry	October 31, 2023	0.65
95	4	"Coming Clean"	Tyler Perry	Tyler Perry	November 7, 2023	0.58
96	5	"Something to Hide"	Tyler Perry	Tyler Perry	November 14, 2023	0.55
97	6	"Gone in a Second"	Derrick Doose	Tyler Perry	November 21, 2023	0.59
98	7	"Exit Wound"	Tyler Perry	Tyler Perry	November 28, 2023	0.65
99	8	"Sorry Not Sorry"	Tyler Perry	Tyler Perry	December 5, 2023	0.63
100	9	"Better Than Revenge"	Tyler Perry	Tyler Perry	December 12, 2023	0.64
101	10	"Sound of Silence"	Tyler Perry	Tyler Perry	December 19, 2023	0.64
102	11	"Recovery"	Tyler Perry	Tyler Perry	December 26, 2023	0.68
Part 2
103	12	"Who's Playing Who?"	Tyler Perry	Tyler Perry	January 2, 2024	0.83
104	13	"A Snake in the Grass"	Tyler Perry	Tyler Perry	January 9, 2024	0.64
105	14	"Off the Deep End"	Tyler Perry	Tyler Perry	January 16, 2024	0.69
106	15	"Dark Secrets"	Tyler Perry	Tyler Perry	January 23, 2024	0.70
107	16	"Bed of Lies"	Tyler Perry	Tyler Perry	January 30, 2024	0.72
108	17	"No Regrets"	Tyler Perry	Tyler Perry	February 6, 2024	0.68
109	18	"Adjust and Adapt"	Tyler Perry	Tyler Perry	February 13, 2024	0.68
110	19	"Breaking News"	Tyler Perry	Tyler Perry	February 20, 2024	0.61
111	20	"Keep Your Enemies Close"	Tyler Perry	Tyler Perry	February 27, 2024	0.61
112	21	"Losing It"	Tyler Perry	Tyler Perry	March 5, 2024	0.58
113	22	"Wild Wild West"	Tyler Perry	Tyler Perry	March 12, 2024	0.62

=== Season 6 (2025) ===
No. overall	No. in season	Title	Directed by	Written by	Original release date	U.S viewers (millions)
Part 1
114	1	"No Escape"	Armani Ortiz	Tyler Perry	January 7, 2025	N/A
115	2	"Blow for Blow"	Armani Ortiz	Tyler Perry	January 14, 2025	N/A
116	3	"Grown Woman"	Armani Ortiz	Tyler Perry	January 21, 2025	N/A
117	4	"Stalemate"	Armani Ortiz	Tyler Perry	January 28, 2025	N/A
118	5	"Unpleasant Surprise"	Armani Ortiz	Tyler Perry	February 4, 2025	N/A
119	6	"Power Play"	Armani Ortiz	Tyler Perry	February 11, 2025	N/A
120	7	"If These Walls Could Talk"	Armani Ortiz	Tyler Perry	February 18, 2025	N/A
121	8	"In Due Time"	Armani Ortiz	Tyler Perry	February 25, 2025	N/A
122	9	"Between Two Fires"	Armani Ortiz	Tyler Perry	March 4, 2025	N/A
123	10	"The Breaking Point"	Armani Ortiz	Tyler Perry	March 11, 2025	N/A
124	11	"Seeing Is Believing"	Armani Ortiz	Tyler Perry	March 18, 2025	N/A
Part 2
125	12	"On Your Mark"	Armani Ortiz	Tyler Perry	October 28, 2025	N/A
126	13	"The Fight for Power"	Armani Ortiz	Tyler Perry	October 28, 2025	N/A
127	14	"Crossed Boundaries"	Armani Ortiz	Tyler Perry	November 4, 2025	N/A
128	15	"The Time Is Now"	Armani Ortiz	Tyler Perry	November 11, 2025	N/A
129	16	"Ironclad"	Armani Ortiz	Tyler Perry	November 18, 2025	N/A
130	17	"A Plan Deferred"	Armani Ortiz	Tyler Perry	November 25, 2025	N/A
131	18	"Lies and Alibis"	Armani Ortiz	Tyler Perry	December 2, 2025	N/A
132	19	"Air Tight"	Armani Ortiz	Tyler Perry	December 9, 2025	N/A
133	20	"The Price We Pay"	Armani Ortiz	Tyler Perry	December 16, 2025	N/A
134	21	"Counterblow"	Armani Ortiz	Tyler Perry	December 23, 2025	N/A
135	22	"Trade of Power"	Armani Ortiz	Tyler Perry	December 23, 2025	N/A

=== Season 7 (2026) ===
No. overall	No. in season	Title	Directed by	Written by	Original release date
136	1	"Catching Fade"	Armani Ortiz	Mark E. Swinton	April 15, 2026
137	2	"A Dish Best Served Cold"	Armani Ortiz	Mark E. Swinton	April 15, 2026
138	3	"Friday the 13th"	Armani Ortiz	Mark E. Swinton	April 15, 2026
139	4	"Sweet Dreams"	Armani Ortiz	Mark E. Swinton	April 15, 2026
140	5	"Family Secrets"	Armani Ortiz	Mark E. Swinton	April 15, 2026
141	6	"Upon Which We Stand"	Armani Ortiz	Mark E. Swinton	April 15, 2026
142	7	"The Enemy Within"	Armani Ortiz	Mark E. Swinton	April 15, 2026
143	8	"Worth the Work"	Armani Ortiz	Mark E. Swinton	April 15, 2026
144	9	"A Woman Scorned"	Armani Ortiz	Mark E. Swinton	April 15, 2026
145	10	"An Ethical Presidency"	Armani Ortiz	Mark E. Swinton	April 15, 2026
146	11	"Will You Stand with Me"	Armani Ortiz	Mark E. Swinton	April 15, 2026
147	12	"The Promise"	Armani Ortiz	Mark E. Swinton	April 15, 2026
148	13	"The Hit List"	Armani Ortiz	Mark E. Swinton	April 15, 2026
149	14	"To Walk and Chew Gum"	Armani Ortiz	Mark E. Swinton	April 15, 2026
150	15	"The Black Mamba"	Armani Ortiz	Mark E. Swinton	April 15, 2026
151	16	"Earth Shattering"	Armani Ortiz	Mark E. Swinton	April 15, 2026
152	17	"Chicken and Rice"	Armani Ortiz	Mark E. Swinton	April 15, 2026
153	18	"Riding the Troubled Waters"	Armani Ortiz	Mark E. Swinton	April 15, 2026
154	19	"In a Heartbeat"	Armani Ortiz	Mark E. Swinton	April 15, 2026
155	20	"Twenty-Four Hours"	Armani Ortiz	Mark E. Swinton	April 15, 2026
156	21	"Agent Stan Bennett"	Armani Ortiz	Mark E. Swinton	April 15, 2026
157	22	"The Filthy Rat"	Armani Ortiz	Mark E. Swinton	April 15, 2026

== Production ==
On February 23, 2021, BET renewed the series for a third season, which premiered on October 12, 2021.

On March 22, 2022, BET renewed the series for a fourth season, which premiered on October 11, 2022.

On September 15, 2023, BET renewed the series for a fifth season, which premiered on October 17, 2023.

On April 16, 2024, the series was renewed for a sixth season, which premiered on January 7, 2025.

The seventh season premiered on Paramount+ on April 15, 2026, but a week later was removed from the site with no explanation given. On May 14, 2026, it was announced that the season, now called the final season, will be rereleased on both Paramount+ and BET beginning May 20, 2026.

== Spin-off ==
On November 7, 2019, it was announced that BET+ ordered Ruthless, a spin-off starring Melissa L. Williams as Ruth Truesdale about a religious sex cult. The series premiered on March 19, 2020.

== Derek Dixon allegations ==
On June 17, 2025, The Oval actor Derek A. Dixon filed a sexual assault and battery lawsuit against Tyler Perry which alleged that Perry had engaged in numerous acts of unwanted sexual advances against him since 2021. In his lawsuit, Dixon stated that Perry had "been using his power and influence to molest, abuse, and sexually assault impressionable and vulnerable employees and actors who look to him for guidance and mentorship while pursuing their dreams." Dixon had previously filed an Equal Employment Opportunity Commission (EEOC) complaint in 2024 which alleged sexual harassment by Perry, and afterwards quit The Oval when the complaint did not result in any action from the show's producers.
