= Chido Nwokocha =

American actor

- Occupation: Actor
- Years active: 2013–present

Chido Nwokocha is an American actor.

== Early life and education ==
Chido Nwokocha is a Nigerian-American who grew up in Sacramento, California. He attended Ohio University, where he played wide receiver. After college, he played professionally for the San Jose SaberCats of the Arena Football League. When a knee injury cut his football career short, he pursued an acting career.

== Career ==
In 2019, Nwokocha began his series regular role of Gary Marshall Borders on the BET show Sistas, written, directed and produced by Tyler Perry. Sistas was renewed for a second season and he returns as Gary Marshall Borders. He has also appeared in a recurring role in TNT’s Murder in the First, and guested on such series as Days of Our Lives, and The Night Shift. Film credits include Destroyer, The Mendoza Line, Bad Therapy and Top Gun: Maverick.

== Filmography ==
=== Television ===
Year	Title	Role	Notes
2024	FBI: International	Tim Connelly	Episode: "June"
2024	Magnum P.I.	Shane	Episode: "The Big Squeeze"
2023	All Rise	Judge Jabari Fleming	Episode: "Trouble Woman"
2022	Quantum Leap	Dr. Felix Watts	Episode: "O Ye of Little Faith"
2021	The Resident	James Carroll	Episode: "Mina's Kangaroo Court"
2020	Hawaii Five-0	Sgt. Michaels	Episode: "I ho'olulu, ho'ohulei 'ia e ka makani"
2019–present	Sistas	Gary Marshall Borders	Series regular; 124 episodes
2019	The Rookie	Marcos Gibson	Episode: "Manhunt"
2018	Days of Our Lives	Luke	Episode: "Episode #1.13473"
2017	The Night Shift	Greggs	Episode: "Control"
2016	Shooter	FBI Special Agent #2	Episode: "Musa Qala"
2016	Murder in the First	Nathan Woodward	2 episodes
2016	Scorpion	Lackey	Episode: "Sun of a Gun"
2013	Little Daddy	Arresting Officer	
2012–13	Wives with Knives	Steve / Matthew	2 episodes

=== Film ===
Year	Title	Role	Notes
TBA	Crossed	Kitrick	Post-production
2022	Something from Tiffany's	Brian	
2022	The Seven Faces of Jane	Tayo	
2022	Top Gun: Maverick	Mission Controller	
2020	Wildcat	Medic	
2020	Bad Therapy	Policeman	
2018	Destroyer	Cop	
2014	Fist 2 Fist 2: Weapon of Choice	Dono Marro	
2014	The Mendoza Line	Doc	

=== Video games ===
Year	Title	Role	Notes
2016	Mafia III	Additional Cinematics Cast	

== See also ==
- IMDb
- Instagram
- Apple TV+
- Spectrum News
- The Perfect Man
