= Fatal Affair =

2020 American psychological thriller film

- Promotional poster
- Directed by: Peter Sullivan
- Written by: Rasheeda Garner; Peter Sullivan
- Produced by: Barry Barnholtz; Nia Long; Jeffrey Schenck; Peter Sullivan; Brian Nolan
- Starring: Nia Long; Omar Epps; Stephen Bishop; KJ Smith
- Cinematography: Eitan Almagor
- Edited by: Randy Carter
- Music by: Matthew Janszen
- Production company: Hybrid Films
- Distributed by: Netflix
- Release date: July 16, 2020
- Running time: 89 minutes
- Country: United States
- Language: English

Fatal Affair is a 2020 American psychological thriller film directed by Peter Sullivan, who co-wrote the screenplay with Rasheeda Garner. It stars Nia Long, Omar Epps, Stephen Bishop, and KJ Smith.

It was released on July 16, 2020, by Netflix.

== Plot ==
Ellie Warren is an attorney living with her husband Marcus who is recovering after a hit and run driver collided with his bicycle. They have just moved into a new house on the coast from the city of San Francisco now that their daughter Brittany has left for college. Ellie meets her firm's new tech consultant, David Hammond, who she has not seen since college twenty years ago. She remains unaware that David is in anger management therapy following an incident with a woman named Deborah. Ellie and David initially meet for drinks, but the situation turns sexual in the club’s bathroom, although Ellie resists. Afterwards, David stalks her via phone calls, texts, viewings of her house from a distance, breaking into her home, hacking into her home security system, sending her a package, and dating Ellie's friend Courtney, despite Ellie's warnings to stay away from her and her family. Ellie neglects telling Marcus or the police. Although Ellie is her trusted friend and David is a new beau, Courtney scoffs at Ellie’s warnings about dating David.

Ellie learns from another one of her former college classmates that David was suspected of, but never arrested for murdering his ex-wife Deborah and her new boyfriend a few months after the divorce. Ellie sends Courtney an e-mail with information about Deborah's murder and how David likely committed it, but David deletes it. Ellie is horrified to see him golfing with Marcus. Ellie accesses David's apartment, where she finds pictures of Deborah and of herself on his computer. Ellie warns Courtney about the pictures; however, David arrives and attacks Courtney. With the police finally involved and looking for David, he feigns suicide by substituting his supposed burned body for that of a homeless man he murders. David leaves a suicide note and other messages confessing his murder of Deborah and her boyfriend; his stalking of Ellie; and, other evidence his guilt.

One night, Ellie receives a message from her assistant (presumably from David) to sign some documents at the office. Ellie finds her assistant murdered on the office floor. Ellie rushes home and, en route, calls the police. She finds David at her house and conceals a knife. In their ensuing scuffle, Ellie knocks David unconscious with a vase, opting not to kill him with the knife she dropped on the floor, with which she initially defended herself. She sees the corpse of Brittany's boyfriend, Scott, and finds Marcus and Brittany tied up. She frees them as the police arrive, but David kills the solitary cop sent to respond to the emergency. As Brittany flees in her car, a fight ensues between Marcus, David, and Ellie. In the melee, Ellie finally stabs David, who then steals the cop’s gun and threatens Ellie. Marcus intervenes and the conflict ends with David falling to his death off a beach cliffside. A few months later, Brittany returns to school, and the Warrens’ newly purchased house is for sale.

== Cast ==
- Nia Long as Ellie Warren
- Omar Epps as David Hammond
- Stephen Bishop as Marcus Warren
- KJ Smith as Deborah Lee
- Jason-Shane Scott as Travis Green
- Aubrey Cleland as Brittany Warren
- Maya Stojan as Courtney
- Carolyn Hennesy as Janice
- Kate Orsini as Lauralee
- Lyn Alicia Henderson as Detective Larson
- Fredella Calloway as Dr. Leigh Beverly
- Jacob Aaron Gaines as Scott
- Kym Jackson as Nicole
- Estelle Swaray as Linda

== Production ==
In October 2019, Deadline reported that Netflix had partnered with Hybrid Films with Peter Sullivan directing the film project. Nia Long, Omar Epps and Stephen Bishop were attached to star in the film, with Sullivan and Rasheeda Garner writing the script. Long, Barry Barnholtz, Brian Nolan and Jeffrey Schenck would serve as producers on the film. In November 2019, it was announced KJ Smith had joined the cast of the film. Principal photography for the film took place on location in Los Angeles, California in 2019.

== Release ==
The film was released on July 16, 2020 by Netflix. It was the top-streamed film on the site in its debut weekend, then placed sixth the following weekend.

== Reception ==
On Rotten Tomatoes, the film holds an approval rating of 19% and an average rating of 3.7/10, based on 37 reviews. The website's critics consensus reads: "As basic as its title, Fatal Affair gets lost between 'so bad it's good' and 'barely there.'" On Metacritic, the film has a weighted average score of 34 out of 100, based on 10 critics, indicating "generally unfavorable" reviews.

Kate Erbland of IndieWire gave the film a "C−" and wrote: "Too chaste to be a Fatal Attraction ripoff and far too dull to approach the hammy charms of Obsessed the greatest assets of Peter Sullivan's Fatal Affair are stars Nia Long and Omar Epps. They keep this from looking and feeling like a limp Lifetime movie knockoff."
