= Brian Jordan Jr. =

American actor

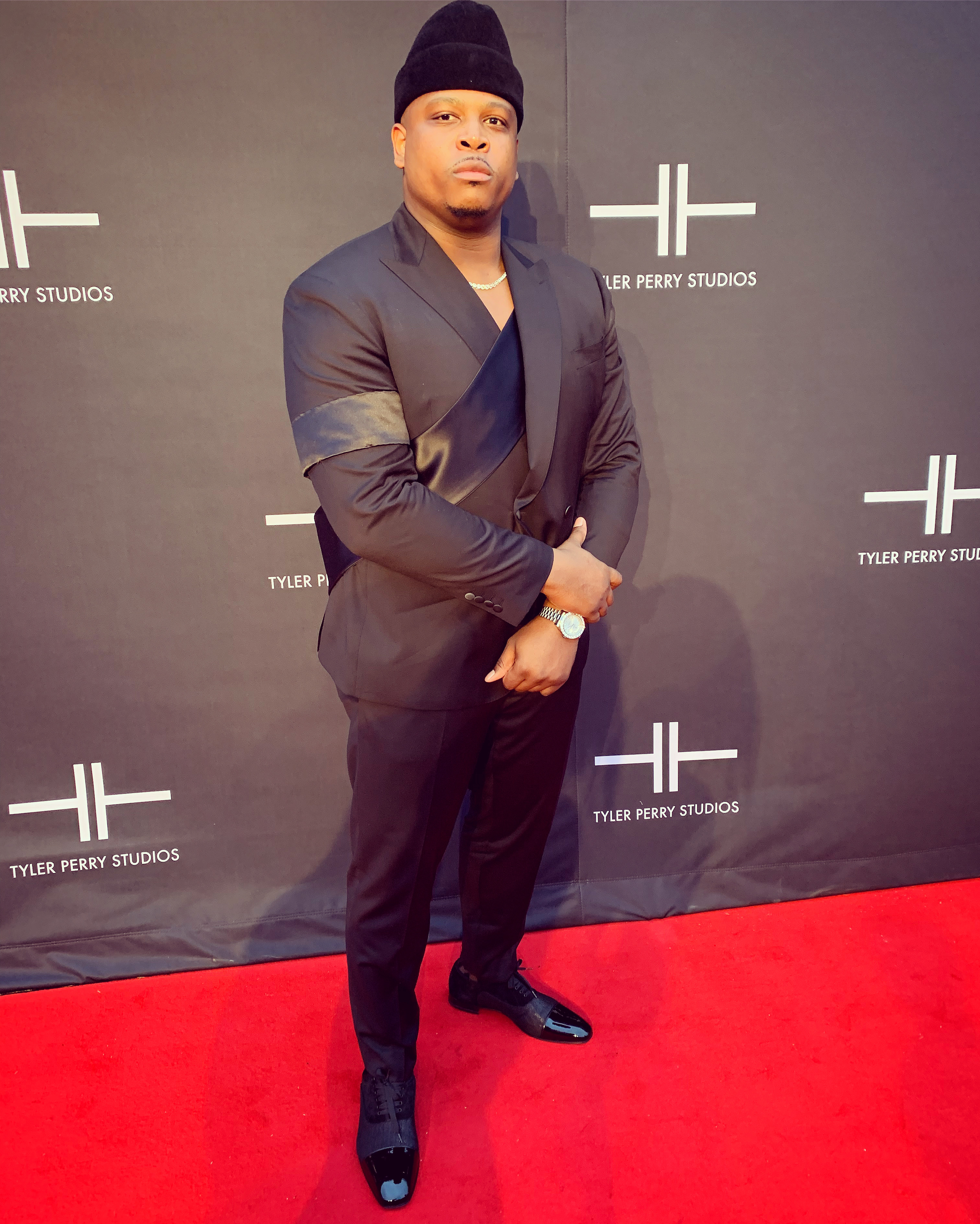
- Born: June 3, 1992 (age 33); Baton Rouge, Louisiana
- Education: Tisch School of the Arts; Louisiana State University
- Occupations: Actor; singer; dancer

Brian Jordan Jr. is an American actor, singer and dancer with many off-broadway and regional theatre credits. He trained at NYU Tisch School of the Arts and The Debbie Allen Dance Academy. Currently is he is starring as Maurice Webb on #1 HIT Sistas on BET. Jordan is a native of Baton Rouge, Louisiana.

== Filmography ==
=== Film ===
Year	Title	Role	Notes
2019	Christmas Belles	Leonard	
2019	Bolden	Principal Dancer	
2020	Sister Circle	Himself	Guest/ Interviewee

=== Television ===
Year	Title	Role	Notes
2019–present	Sistas	Maurice Webb	Series regular
