= Bruh =

US comedy television series by Tyler Perry

- Also known as: Tyler Perry's Bruh
- Genre: Comedy
- Created by: Tyler Perry
- Written by: Tyler Perry
- Directed by: Tyler Perry
- Starring: Barry Brewer; Mahdi Cocci; Phillip Mullings Jr.; Monti Washington; Chandra Currelley-Young; Candice Renee; Alyssa Goss; Shawn Vaughn
- Country of origin: United States
- Original language: American English
- No. of seasons: 4
- No. of episodes: 75

Production
- Executive producers: Tyler Perry; Michelle Sneed; Mark E. Swinton
- Camera setup: Single
- Running time: 22–29 minutes
- Production company: Tyler Perry Studios

Original release
- Network: BET+
- Release: May 7, 2020 – August 15, 2024

Related
- Sistas

Bruh is an American television series created, written, executive produced and directed by Tyler Perry that premiered on May 7, 2020, on BET+.

== Plot ==
The series follows five middle-aged best friends (John, Tom, Mike, Bill and Greg) from college as they explore the world of dating, careers and friendship in a present-day society. John, the owner of a sandwich shop (A's & J's), struggles to make ends meet after an incident got him kicked out of college. He often depends on his friends for support and lives with his mother, Alice who constantly tolerates him. She co-owns the business with her son. Tom, a successful doctor, struggles to uphold his name when an incident from his past with one of his co-workers puts his career in jeopardy. Mike, who works as a lawyer, wants to settle down but struggles to put his womanizing ways to rest. His on-and-off girlfriend Pamela finds it hard to believe. Bill, who is an architect, is revisited by his ex, Regina who is recently engaged to one of his good friends from college so he attempts to reconcile with her, due to infidelity which ended their relationship. Bill works hard to prove to her that he's a changed man and Greg, Tom's college roommate who is also a doctor, moves to Atlanta to rebuild his life after going through a rough divorce and immediately builds a relationship with the guys while Tom is away dealing with a family emergency and works with Tom at the hospital. Greg meets Darla, an officer who lives down the hall from him and Tom and is instantly attracted to her. The "bruhs" come together to get away from their everyday lives.

== Cast and characters ==
=== Main ===
- Barry Brewer as Johnathan "John" Watts, a businessman
- Mahdi Cocci as Dr. Thomas "Tom" Brooks, a doctor
- Phillip Mullings Jr. as Michael "Mike" Alexander, a lawyer
- Monti Washington as Billiam "Bill" Frazier, an architect
- Chandra Currelley-Young as Alice Watts, John's mother
- Candice Renee as Regina, Bill's ex, who is engaged to another man
- Alyssa Goss as Pamela Jones, Mike's on-and-off girlfriend
- Shawn Vaughn as Dr. Greg Hunter (season 3; recurring season 2), Tom's college roommate who moves to Atlanta after getting divorced

=== Recurring ===
- Angela Marie Rigsby as Laura (season 1), John and Alice's employee at their restaurant
- Caroline Harris as Valerie (season 1), a nurse who works with Tom at the hospital and accuses him of sexual harassment
- Darren Sirell Cain as Peter Promnickel (season 1), Regina's ex-fiancé
- Quei Tann as Officer Darla Grills (seasons 2–3), Tom's neighbor and Greg's love interest
- Liz Lafontant as Natalie (seasons 2–3), Bill's ex and a yoga instructor
- Ebony N. Mayo as Littia (seasons 2–3), a bartender and John's new love interest
- Karen Malina White as Hilda (season 3), Regina's mother
- Christopher B. Duncan as Coach O'Brien (season 4)

=== Special guest cast from Tyler Perry's Sistas ===
- KJ Smith as Andrea "Andi" Barnes, Mike's friend and colleague
- Michael King as Don Bellamy, Mike and Andi's boss

== Episodes ==
Season	Episodes		Originally released	
Season	Episodes		First released	Last released
1	24	12	May 7, 2020	July 9, 2020
1	24	12	October 10, 2020	November 12, 2020
2	19	10	May 27, 2021	July 15, 2021
2	19	9	October 21, 2021	December 2, 2021
3	22	11	May 12, 2022	July 7, 2022
3	22	11	December 1, 2022	January 26, 2023
4	10		July 18, 2024	August 15, 2024

=== Season 1 (2020) ===
No. overall	No. in season	Title	Directed by	Written by	Original release date
Part 1
1	1	"Pilot"	Tyler Perry	Tyler Perry	May 7, 2020
2	2	"My Own Two Feet"	Tyler Perry	Tyler Perry	May 7, 2020
3	3	"Chapter 7"	Tyler Perry	Tyler Perry	May 7, 2020
4	4	"On My Own"	Tyler Perry	Tyler Perry	May 14, 2020
5	5	"The Hamster Wheel"	Tyler Perry	Tyler Perry	May 21, 2020
6	6	"In Debt"	Tyler Perry	Tyler Perry	May 28, 2020
7	7	"The Cute Ones"	Tyler Perry	Tyler Perry	June 4, 2020
8	8	"My Brother's Keeper"	Tyler Perry	Tyler Perry	June 11, 2020
9	9	"Twenty-Four Hours"	Tyler Perry	Tyler Perry	June 18, 2020
10	10	"A Lone Wolf"	Tyler Perry	Tyler Perry	June 25, 2020
11	11	"The Double Standard"	Tyler Perry	Tyler Perry	July 2, 2020
12	12	"Dogs in the Snow"	Tyler Perry	Tyler Perry	July 9, 2020
Part 2
13	13	"Playing With Fire"	Tyler Perry	Tyler Perry	September 10, 2020
14	14	"On Thin Ice"	Tyler Perry	Tyler Perry	September 10, 2020
15	15	"Blue Sports Car"	Tyler Perry	Tyler Perry	September 10, 2020
16	16	"She's Calling"	Tyler Perry	Tyler Perry	September 17, 2020
17	17	"Falling Into Fate"	Tyler Perry	Tyler Perry	September 24, 2020
18	18	"White Horse"	Tyler Perry	Tyler Perry	October 1, 2020
19	19	"A Fool in Love"	Tyler Perry	Tyler Perry	October 8, 2020
20	20	"In the Past"	Tyler Perry	Tyler Perry	October 15, 2020
21	21	"The Slow Walk"	Tyler Perry	Tyler Perry	October 22, 2020
22	22	"Better Late Than Never"	Tyler Perry	Tyler Perry	October 29, 2020
23	23	"Nelly"	Tyler Perry	Tyler Perry	November 5, 2020
24	24	"Bad Cologne"	Tyler Perry	Tyler Perry	November 12, 2020

=== Season 2 (2021) ===
No. overall	No. in season	Title	Directed by	Written by	Original release date
Part 1
25	1	"I Love LA"	Tyler Perry	Tyler Perry	May 27, 2021
26	2	"There She Go"	Tyler Perry	Tyler Perry	May 27, 2021
27	3	"The Coffee Date"	Tyler Perry	Tyler Perry	May 27, 2021
28	4	"Receipts"	Tyler Perry	Tyler Perry	June 3, 2021
29	5	"The Code"	Tyler Perry	Tyler Perry	June 10, 2021
30	6	"More Than A Peck"	Tyler Perry	Tyler Perry	June 17, 2021
31	7	"High School"	Tyler Perry	Tyler Perry	June 24, 2021
32	8	"The Flower Child"	Tyler Perry	Tyler Perry	July 1, 2021
33	9	"An Eye for An Eye"	Tyler Perry	Tyler Perry	July 8, 2021
34	10	"The Long Journey"	Tyler Perry	Tyler Perry	July 15, 2021
Part 2
35	11	"One Chance"	Tyler Perry	Tyler Perry	October 21, 2021
36	12	"Like The Wind"	Tyler Perry	Tyler Perry	October 21, 2021
37	13	"What I Feel"	Tyler Perry	Tyler Perry	October 21, 2021
38	14	"Tomorrow Comes"	Tyler Perry	Tyler Perry	October 28, 2021
39	15	"Cold Feet"	Tyler Perry	Tyler Perry	November 4, 2021
40	16	"The Appointed Time"	Tyler Perry	Tyler Perry	November 11, 2021
41	17	"Once Upon a Time"	Tyler Perry	Tyler Perry	November 18, 2021
42	18	"Around Each Corner"	Tyler Perry	Tyler Perry	November 25, 2021
43	19	"It's Just Dinner"	Tyler Perry	Tyler Perry	December 2, 2021

=== Season 3 (2022–23) ===
No. overall	No. in season	Title	Directed by	Written by	Original release date
Part 1
44	1	"The Dog House"	Tyler Perry	Tyler Perry	May 12, 2022
45	2	"The Morning After"	Tyler Perry	Tyler Perry	May 12, 2022
46	3	"Human To Human"	Tyler Perry	Tyler Perry	May 12, 2022
47	4	"Control"	Tyler Perry	Tyler Perry	May 19, 2022
48	5	"In The Blink Of An Eye"	Tyler Perry	Tyler Perry	May 26, 2022
49	6	"Honesty Is Best"	Tyler Perry	Tyler Perry	June 2, 2022
50	7	"Blueprints"	Tyler Perry	Tyler Perry	June 9, 2022
51	8	"Say What You Want"	Tyler Perry	Tyler Perry	June 16, 2022
52	9	"The Set Up"	Tyler Perry	Tyler Perry	June 23, 2022
53	10	"Around And Around"	Tyler Perry	Tyler Perry	June 30, 2022
54	11	"A Wall Between Us"	Tyler Perry	Tyler Perry	July 7, 2022
Part 2
55	12	"Pound Cake"	Tyler Perry	Tyler Perry	December 1, 2022
56	13	"A Repeat"	Tyler Perry	Tyler Perry	December 1, 2022
57	14	"Between A Rock And A Hard Place"	Tyler Perry	Tyler Perry	December 1, 2022
58	15	"Upside Down"	Tyler Perry	Tyler Perry	December 8, 2022
59	16	"Dancing Around"	Tyler Perry	Tyler Perry	December 15, 2022
60	17	"In A Hallway"	Tyler Perry	Tyler Perry	December 22, 2022
61	18	"In Control"	Tyler Perry	Tyler Perry	December 29, 2022
62	19	"Troubled Waters"	Tyler Perry	Tyler Perry	January 5, 2023
63	20	"Misery"	Tyler Perry	Tyler Perry	January 12, 2023
64	21	"Locked Out"	Tyler Perry	Tyler Perry	January 19, 2023
65	22	"A Signed Letter"	Tyler Perry	Tyler Perry	January 26, 2023

=== Season 4 (2024) ===
No. overall	No. in season	Title	Directed by	Written by	Original release date
66	1	"A Fresh Start"	Mark E. Swinton	Branyon Davis	July 18, 2024
67	2	"Blessings"	Derrick Doose	Tony Rhone III	July 18, 2024
68	3	"Double Up"	Mark E. Swinton	Tyrell Crawford	July 25, 2024
69	4	"Ghosts"	Derrick Doose	Branyon Davis	July 25, 2024
70	5	"Disconcerted"	Mark E. Swinton	Tyrell Crawford	August 1, 2024
71	6	"Invest In Yourself"	Derrick Doose	Tony Rhone III	August 1, 2024
72	7	"The Art of Retrieval"	Unknown	Unknown	August 8, 2024
73	8	"To Life"	Unknown	Unknown	August 8, 2024
74	9	"Secrets and Weakness"	Unknown	Unknown	August 15, 2024
75	10	"Decent Proposal"	Derrick Doose	Tyrell Crawford	August 15, 2024

== Production ==
In September 2020, a second season was announced consisting of 19 episodes. The second season premiered on May 27, 2021. In November 2021, the series was renewed for a third season, which premiered on May 12, 2022. On April 16, 2024, the show was renewed for a fourth season, which premiered on July 18, 2024.
