= Crystal Renee Hayslett =

American actress

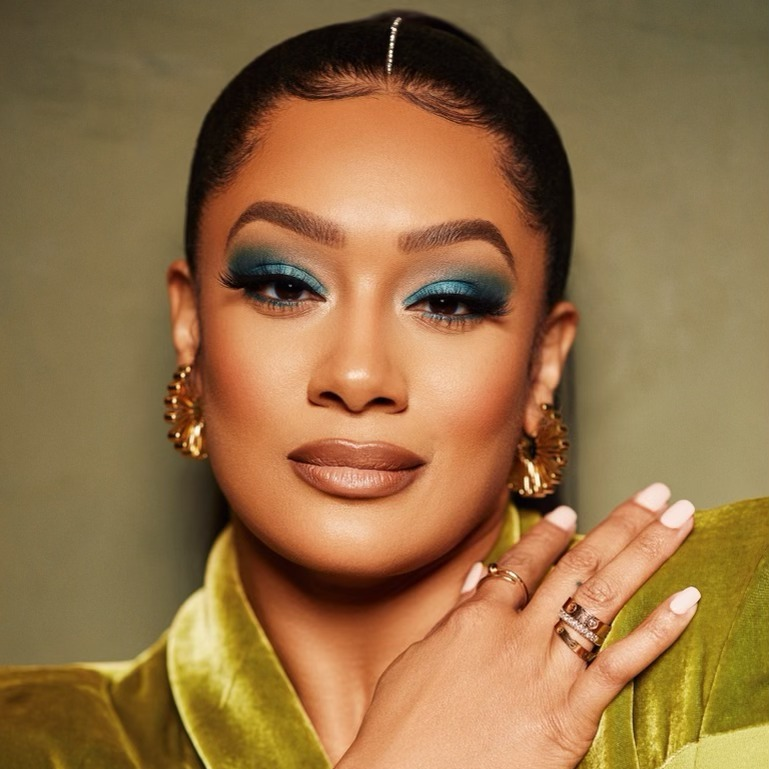
- Born: Martin, Tennessee
- Education: University of Tennessee at Martin
- Occupations: Actress, costume designer, singer-songwriter
- Years active: 2010–present
- Website: crystalreneehayslett.com

Crystal Renee Hayslett is an American actress, producer, podcast host and costume designer. She is known for her role as Fatima Wilson in the BET comedy-drama series, Sistas and its spin-off, Zatima.

== Life and career ==
Hayslett was born and raised in Tennessee. She attended the University of Tennessee at Martin, where she earned a bachelor's degree in Mass Communication and Public Relations. She worked on Capitol Hill for a short time and left Washington, D.C. in 2009 and moved to Atlanta to pursue music and acting. She landed a job at Tyler Perry Studios as a production assistant in 2012. Hayslett worked as costume designer in television series If Loving You Is Wrong, Too Close to Home, The Haves and the Have Nots, The Paynes and Tyler Perry's Young Dylan, and films The 5th Wave (2016), Boo! A Madea Halloween (2016), Sleepless (2017), Boo 2! A Madea Halloween (2017), Acrimony (2018), Nobody's Fool (2018), A Madea Family Funeral (2019) and Tyson's Run (2022).

In 2019, Hayslett was cast for the recurring role in the Tyler Perry comedy-drama series, Sistas playing Fatima Wilson. She was promoted to series regular as of show' second season. In 2021, it was announced that BET+ ordered Zatima, a spin-off starring Hayslett and Devale Ellis. The series premiered in 2022. In 2023, Hayslett appeared in the musical comedy film, Praise This.

== Filmography ==
Year	Title	Role	Notes
2010	This Time	Waitress	Short film
2018	The Choir Director	Gale	
2019—present	Sistas	Fatima Wilson	Recurring (season 1); main role (season 2–present)
2022–present	Zatima	Fatima Wilson	Main role
2023	Praise This	Natalie	
