= Zatima =

American comedy drama television series

- Also known as: Tyler Perry's Zatima
- Genre: Comedy drama
- Created by: Tyler Perry
- Written by: Tyler Perry
- Directed by: Tyler Perry
- Starring: Devale Ellis; Crystal Renee Hayslett; Nzinga Imani; Remington Hoffman; Cameron Fuller; Jasmin Brown; Guyviaud Joseph; Laila Odom; Ameer Baraka; Trinity Whiteside; Lindsay Diann
- Country of origin: United States
- Original language: English
- No. of seasons: 4
- No. of episodes: 70

Production
- Executive producer: Tyler Perry
- Producer: Mark E. Swinton
- Camera setup: Single
- Production company: Tyler Perry Studios

Original release
- Network: BET+
- Release: September 22, 2022 – October 9, 2025
- Network: Paramount+
- Release: May 12, 2026 – present

Related
- Sistas

Zatima is an American comedy drama television series created by Tyler Perry as a spin-off of Sistas. It premiered on BET+ on September 22, 2022. The series moved to Paramount+, and the second half of its fourth season premiered on May 12, 2026.

== Plot ==
In this spin-off from Sistas, Zac and Fatima start their new journey as a couple but a series of secrets, lies, infidelity, and exes threaten the pair's newfound love.

== Cast and characters ==
=== Main ===
- Devale Ellis as Zachary "Zac" Taylor
- Crystal Renee Hayslett as Fatima Wilson-Taylor
- Nzinga Imani as Angela
- Remington Hoffman as Bryce
- Cameron Fuller as Nathan
- Jasmin Brown as Deja (season 2–present; recurring, season 1)
- Guyviaud Joseph as Tony (season 2–present; recurring, season 1)
- Danielle LaRoach as Belinda (season 2–present; recurring, season 1)
- Laila Odom as Connie (season 2–present)
- Ameer Baraka as Jeremiah (season 3–present; recurring, season 1–2)
- Trinity Whiteside as Preston Horace (season 3–present)
- Lindsay Diann as Leslie (season 4; recurring, season 3)

=== Recurring ===
- Tony D. Head as Henry
- Kim Baptiste as Mona Wilson
- Jamie Jones as Dr. Reid (season 2)
- Redaric Williams as Paul (season 2)
- Jen Harper as Gladys (season 2)
- Hasani Vibez Comer as Micah (season 3)

== Episodes ==
Season	Episodes		Originally released		
Season	Episodes		First released	Last released	Network
1	10		September 22, 2022	October 20, 2022	BET+
2	20	10	March 16, 2023	April 13, 2023	BET+
2	20	10	August 24, 2023	September 21, 2023	BET+
3	20	10	October 3, 2024	October 31, 2024	BET+
3	20	10	December 26, 2024	January 23, 2025	BET+
4	20	10	September 11, 2025	October 9, 2025	BET+
4	20	10	May 12, 2026	July 7, 2026	Paramount+

=== Season 1 (2022) ===
No. overall	No. in season	Title	Directed by	Written by	Original release date
1	1	"A New Chapter"	Tyler Perry	Tyler Perry	September 22, 2022
2	2	"Water Under The Bridge"	Tyler Perry	Tyler Perry	September 22, 2022
3	3	"Off Limits"	Tyler Perry	Tyler Perry	September 29, 2022
4	4	"To Tell The Truth"	Tyler Perry	Tyler Perry	September 29, 2022
5	5	"The Element of Surprise"	Tyler Perry	Tyler Perry	October 6, 2022
6	6	"Cutting Ties"	Tyler Perry	Tyler Perry	October 6, 2022
7	7	"Trouble at Home"	Tyler Perry	Tyler Perry	October 13, 2022
8	8	"About Last Night"	Tyler Perry	Tyler Perry	October 13, 2022
9	9	"Wicked"	Tyler Perry	Tyler Perry	October 20, 2022
10	10	"To Be Frank"	Tyler Perry	Tyler Perry	October 20, 2022

=== Season 2 (2023) ===
No. overall	No. in season	Title	Directed by	Written by	Original release date
Part 1
11	1	"Basic Instinct"	Tyler Perry	Tyler Perry	March 16, 2023
12	2	"Guilt Trip"	Tyler Perry	Tyler Perry	March 16, 2023
13	3	"Close Quarters"	Tyler Perry	Tyler Perry	March 23, 2023
14	4	"Temperature Rising"	Tyler Perry	Tyler Perry	March 23, 2023
15	5	"Not What You Think"	Tyler Perry	Tyler Perry	March 30, 2023
16	6	"Too Close for Comfort"	Tyler Perry	Tyler Perry	March 30, 2023
17	7	"Mind Over Matter"	Tyler Perry	Tyler Perry	April 6, 2023
18	8	"Suspicious Minds"	Tyler Perry	Tyler Perry	April 6, 2023
19	9	"The Dinner Diagnosis"	Tyler Perry	Tyler Perry	April 13, 2023
20	10	"The Good With The Bad"	Tyler Perry	Tyler Perry	April 13, 2023
Part 2
21	11	"Out of Love"	Armani Ortiz	Tyler Perry	August 24, 2023
22	12	"Risky Business"	Armani Ortiz	Tyler Perry	August 24, 2023
23	13	"Never Too Late"	Armani Ortiz	Tyler Perry	August 31, 2023
24	14	"Redemption"	Armani Oritz	Tyler Perry	August 31, 2023
25	15	"Moments Of Clarity"	Armani Oritz	Tyler Perry	September 7, 2023
26	16	"A Gamble At Love"	Armani Oritz	Tyler Perry	September 7, 2023
27	17	"Energy Shift"	Armani Oritz	Tyler Perry	September 14, 2023
28	18	"Pride To The Side"	Armani Oritz	Tyler Perry	September 14, 2023
29	19	"Dear Mama"	Armani Oritz	Tyler Perry	September 21, 2023
30	20	"The Ugly Truth"	Armani Oritz	Tyler Perry	September 21, 2023

=== Season 3 (2024–25) ===
No. overall	No. in season	Title	Directed by	Written by	Original release date
Part 1
31	1	"Counting The Cost"	Kvle Johnson	Tyler Perry	October 3, 2024
32	2	"Brother's Keeper"	Kvle Johnson	Tyler Perry	October 3, 2024
33	3	"Decisions, Decisions"	Kvle Johnson	Tyler Perry	October 10, 2024
34	4	"Help Yourself"	Kvle Johnson	Tyler Perry	October 10, 2024
35	5	"Game Changer"	Kvle Johnson	Tyler Perry	October 17, 2024
36	6	"No More Lies"	Matt Alves	Tyler Perry	October 17, 2024
37	7	"Losing It"	Matt Alves	Tyler Perry	October 24, 2024
38	8	"Brothers and Enemies"	Matt Alves	Tyler Perry	October 24, 2024
39	9	"Mercy Me"	Matt Alves	Tyler Perry	October 31, 2024
40	10	"Twin Flames"	Matt Alves	Tyler Perry	October 31, 2024
Part 2
41	11	"Actions and Consequences"	Matt Alves	Tyler Perry	December 26, 2024
42	12	"Tipping Point"	Matt Alves	Tyler Perry	December 26, 2024
43	13	"Life Goes On"	Courtney Glaudé	Tyler Perry	January 2, 2025
44	14	"Free Zac"	Courtney Glaudé	Tyler Perry	January 2, 2025
45	15	"Everybody Knows"	Courtney Glaudé	Tyler Perry	January 9, 2025
46	16	"Art of Surprise"	Courtney Glaudé	Tyler Perry	January 9, 2025
47	17	"Forgiveness"	Courtney Glaudé	Tyler Perry	January 16, 2025
48	18	"Unrequited Love"	Courtney Glaudé	Tyler Perry	January 16, 2025
49	19	"Surprise Surprise"	Courtney Glaudé	Tyler Perry	January 23, 2025
50	20	"To Die For"	Courtney Glaudé	Tyler Perry	January 23, 2025

=== Season 4 (2025–26) ===
No. overall	No. in season	Title	Directed by	Written by	Original release date
Part 1
51	1	"To Live For"	Courtney Glaudé	Courtney Glaudé	September 11, 2025
52	2	"Spring Forward"	Courtney Glaudé	Courtney Glaudé	September 11, 2025
53	3	"Who Left the Door Open"	Courtney Glaudé	Courtney Glaudé	September 18, 2025
54	4	"Obsession"	Courtney Glaudé	Courtney Glaudé	September 18, 2025
55	5	"Lose to Win"	Courtney Glaudé	Courtney Glaudé	September 25, 2025
56	6	"Seeing Double"	Courtney Glaudé	Courtney Glaudé	September 25, 2025
57	7	"Stronger Together"	Courtney Glaudé	Courtney Glaudé	October 2, 2025
58	8	"Family Affair"	Courtney Glaudé	Courtney Glaudé	October 2, 2025
59	9	"Smoking Mirrors"	Courtney Glaudé	Courtney Glaudé	October 9, 2025
60	10	"Through the Fire"	Courtney Glaudé	Courtney Glaudé	October 9, 2025
Part 2
61	11	"Protect & Serve"	Courtney Glaudé	Courtney Glaudé	May 12, 2026
62	12	"Court of Opinion"	Courtney Glaudé	Courtney Glaudé	May 12, 2026
63	13	"Drive Me Crazy"	Courtney Glaudé	Courtney Glaudé	May 19, 2026
64	14	"Operation Zac Attack"	Courtney Glaudé	Courtney Glaudé	May 26, 2026
65	15	"Matters of the Heart"	Courtney Glaudé	Courtney Glaudé	June 2, 2026
66	16	"The Takedown" "Pride and Prejudice"	Courtney Glaudé	Courtney Glaudé	June 9, 2026
67	17	"Life is Hard, Death is Easy" "Making Amends"	Courtney Glaudé	Courtney Glaudé	June 16, 2026
68	18	"Bet on Black"	Courtney Glaudé	Courtney Glaudé	June 23, 2026
69	19	"The Setup" "The Countdown"	Courtney Glaudé	Courtney Glaudé	June 30, 2026
70	20	"In the Shadows"	Courtney Glaudé	Courtney Glaudé	July 7, 2026

== Production ==
=== Development ===
The series was picked up by BET+ on December 8, 2021. On August 26, 2022, it was announced that the series would premiere on September 29, 2022. It was later rescheduled to September 22, 2022, a week before. On February 17, 2023, a second season was ordered and announced and it premiered on March 16, 2023. The third season premiered on October 3, 2024. On January 24, 2025, the show was renewed for a fourth season which premiered on September 11, 2025. On April 22, 2026, it was announced that the second half of the fourth season will premiere on May 12, 2026 on Paramount+.

=== Casting ===
The main cast was revealed on August 26, 2022.
