= Devale Ellis =

American football player (born 1984)

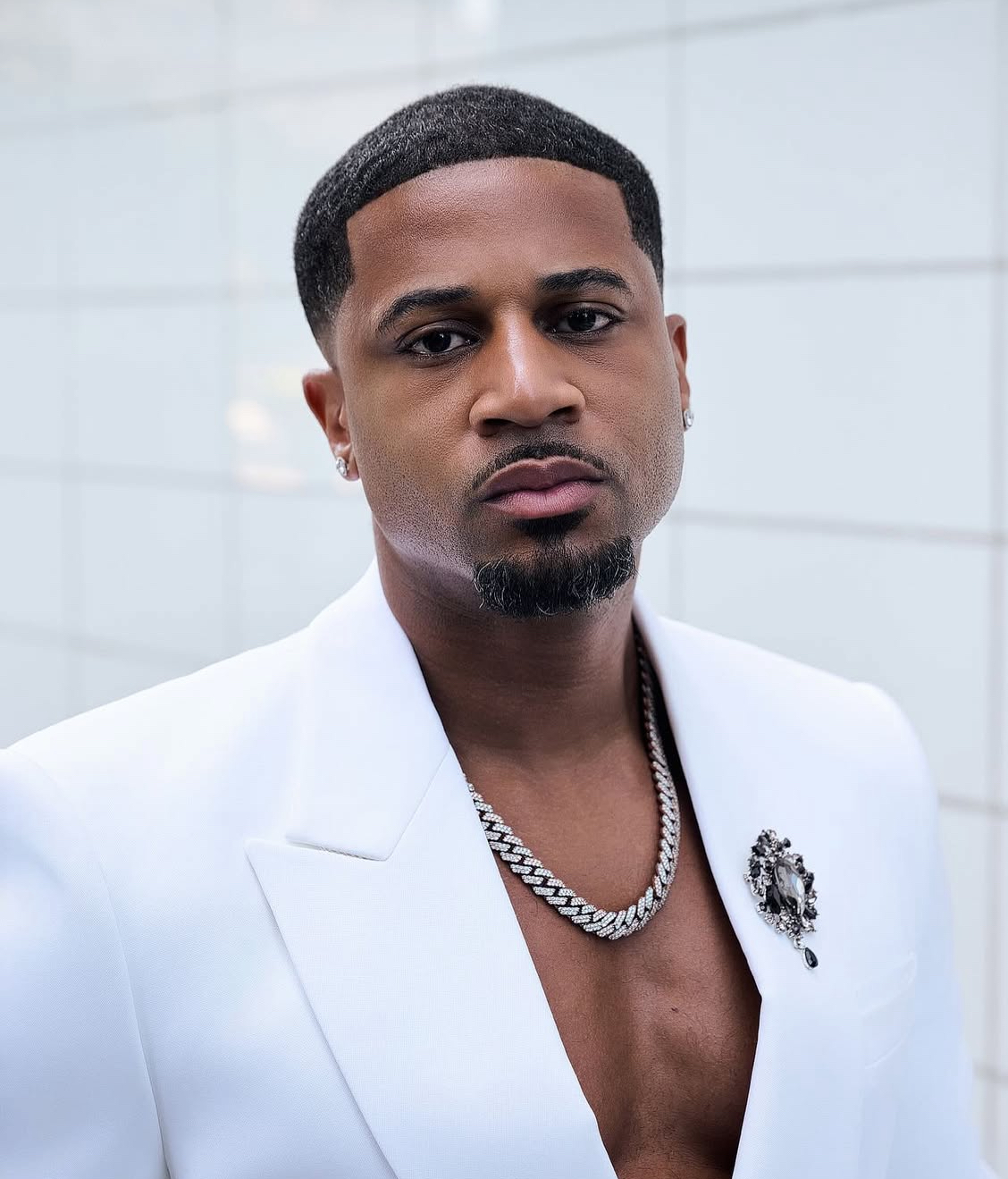
- Ellis in 2025

No. 15
- Position: Wide receiver

Personal information
- Born: April 2, 1984 (age 42); Brooklyn, New York, U.S.
- Listed height: 5 ft 10 in (1.78 m)
- Listed weight: 174 lb (79 kg)

Career information
- College: Hofstra
- NFL draft: 2006: undrafted

Career history
- Detroit Lions (2006–2007); Cleveland Browns (2009)

Awards and highlights
- Second-team All-A-10 (2005)

Career NFL statistics
- Receptions: 4
- Receiving yards: 41
- Return yards: 200
- Stats at Pro Football Reference

Devale Ellis (born April 2, 1984, in Brooklyn, New York) is an American actor and former football player. He was signed by the Detroit Lions as an undrafted free agent in 2006. He played college football at Hofstra. As an actor, Ellis is best known for portraying Zac Taylor in the BET comedy-drama series Sistas and its spin-off Zatima.

== Early life ==
Devale Ellis is the son of Troy and Karen Ellis. He has one brother Brian and a sister Tori. Devale attended James Madison High School in Brooklyn, New York, where he played football and basketball. In his senior year at Madison, he lit up the Public School Athletic League. He was in the top ten for catches made and in the top ten for touchdowns made by a wide receiver. He also played in the PSAL all-star game. During the season, he earned the nickname Devale "Show Time" Ellis.

He attended Hofstra University, where he was a teammate of New Orleans Saints wide receiver Marques Colston. Ellis finished his career with 176 catches for 2,207 yards (a 12.5 per-catch average) and 22 touchdowns. As a senior in 2005, he led Hofstra with 74 receptions for 943 yards and five touchdowns. He ranked second in the Atlantic 10 in receptions, third in receiving yards, and ninth in all-purpose yards (103.8 yards per game). As a junior, with Colston sidelined all season with an injury, Ellis led the team ranked second in the Atlantic 10 and 11th in I-AA with 74 catches, good for 1,067 yards (a 14.4 average) and 13 touchdowns.

== Football career ==
He went undrafted in the 2006 NFL draft, but was signed as a free agent to the Detroit Lions as a wide receiver (WR) after participating in the rookie mini-camp as a tryout player. He was signed to the Lions eight man practice squad on September 3, 2006. Although he played in the season opener against the Seattle Seahawks on the September 9th, he was waived from the active roster on September 11, and shortly afterwards re-signed with the practice squad. As of October 15, he had been upgraded to the active roster and made his first start against the Buffalo Bills. Ellis was waived by the Lions during final cuts on August 30, 2008.

After spending the 2008 regular season out of football, Ellis was signed to a future contract by the Cleveland Browns on December 31, 2008. He was waived on July 26, 2009.

== Acting career ==
In 2010s, Ellis began acting guest-starring on television series including Power, The Mysteries of Laura, Gotham, The Blacklist and NCIS. In 2019 he was cast as a series regular in the BET comedy-drama series, Sistas. Ellis also had a recurring role in another BET series, Bigger from 2019 to 2021 and guest-starred on The Equalizer. In 2022 he appeared in the thriller film Single Black Female for Lifetime starring opposite Amber Riley and Raven Goodwin. Also that year, Ellis played male lead opposite Eva Marcille in the Oprah Winfrey Network comedy-drama television film, A Christmas Fumble. In 2021, it was announced that BET+ ordered Zatima, a spin-off starring Ellis and Crystal Renee Hayslett. The series premiered in 2022. In 2023, he was cast opposite Christina Milian in the Netflix romantic comedy film Meet Me Next Christmas.

== Personal life ==
He is married to Khadeen Joseph (b. 1983). Together they have four sons: Jackson Carter (b. 2011), Kairo Shakur (b. 2016), Kaz Hendrix (b. 2017) and Dakota Marley (b. 2021).Devale and Khadeen have a comedy filled YouTube channel called "The Ellises" where they showcase their family vlogs and skits. In 2019, they created a podcast called “Dead Ass” together where they share stories, opinions and give advice on love, marriage and business.

== Filmography ==
=== Film ===
Year	Title	Role	Notes
2013	Full Circle	Tommy	
2015	Stanhope	Raheem	Short film
2016	Ticket Cop	Ace	Short film
2016	Honorable Mike	Larry the EMS Guy	Short film
2016	A Piece of Me: An Everyday Story	Bryce King	
2017	Marz	Mel	Short film
2022	Single Black Female	Eric	Television film
2022	A Christmas Fumble	Jordan Davies	
2023	The Perfect Find	Dialo	
2024	Meet Me Next Christmas	Teddy	

=== Television ===
Year	Title	Role	Notes
2014	Young Like Us	Trent	2 episodes
2015	Power	Light Skin	Episode: "Time's Up"
2016	The Mysteries of Laura	Cyclist	Episode: "The Mystery of the Downward Spiral"
2017	Gotham	Orderly	Episode: "Wrath of the Villains: Unleashed"
2017	The Blacklist	Chuck Shaw	Episode: "Dembe Zuma (No. 10)"
2017	Master of None	Security Guard	Episode: "New York, I Love You"
2017	Giving Me Life (in the Land of the Deadass)	Randall	Episode: "Nala"
2017–19	Makeup X Breakup	Gavin	13 episodes
2017	Placeholders	Lonely Heart	2 episodes
2017–18	Tough Love	Joseph	5 episodes
2017	Vish Merrick	Vish Merrick	10 episodes
2019	It's Bruno!	Nelson	5 episodes
2019	NCIS	Dante Brown	Episode: "Institutionalized"
2021	The Equalizer	Preacher / Reggie Floyd	Episode: "Judgment Day"
2019–21	Bigger	Ken	7 episodes
2019–present	Sistas	Zac Taylor	Main role
2022	Everything's Trash	Damien Washington	Episode: "Rom-Coms Are Mostly Trash"
2022–present	Zatima	Zac Taylor	Main role
2023	61st Street	Mason	2 episodes
