= Novi Brown =

American actress

- Born: Berlin, Germany
- Occupation: Actress
- Years active: 2012–present

Novi Brown is a German-born American actress. She starred as Sabrina Hollins in the BET comedy-drama series, Sistas.

== Life and career ==
Brown was born in Berlin, Germany and spent the first years of life between the United States and Germany. She attended the City College of New York and began her acting career appearing in theatre productions of The Vagina Monologues, Dutchman and Boston Marriage. She made her first screen appearance in the 2014 made-for-television film, My Dad's a Soccer Mom. In 2019, she began starring as Sabrina Hollins in the BET comedy-drama series, Sistas.

In 2022, Brown played the leading roles in three films: the horror thriller Alone in the Dark for Tubi, the romantic comedy The First Noelle, and the holiday comedy Holiday Hideaway opposite Vivica A. Fox for BET+.

== Filmography ==
=== Film ===
Year	Title	Role	Notes
2019	Sleeping with My Student	Megan	
2020	Under My Skin	Sales Assistant	
2021	Real Talk	Gina	
2022	Spider	Roshanda James	
2022	Alone in the Dark	Bri Collins	
2022	The First Noelle	Noelle	
2022	Holiday Hideaway	Winnie	
2022	Skip to the End	Hannah	Short film
2024	A Wesley South African Christmas	Cameron Wesley	

=== Television ===
Year	Title	Role	Notes
2014	My Dad's a Soccer Mom	Tori	Television film
2019—2025	Sistas	Sabrina Hollins	Main role
2022	NCIS	Olive Miller	Episode: "Starting Over"
