= List of programs broadcast by BET =

This is a list of current and upcoming programming on BET (Black Entertainment Television).

== Current programming ==
=== Original programming ===
==== Drama ====
Title	Genre	Premiere	Seasons	Length	Status
Sistas	Comedy drama	October 23, 2019	10 seasons, 212 episodes	31–42 min	Season 10 ongoing
Her Baby	Thriller	October 7, 2026	1 season, 4 episodes	31 min	Pending
Church Wives	Drama	November 4, 2026	1 season, 1 episode	30 min	Season 1 ongoing

==== Comedy ====
Title	Genre	Premiere	Seasons	Length	Status
Tyler Perry's Assisted Living	Sitcom	September 2, 2020	7 seasons, 135 episodes	18–21 min	Season 7 ongoing
Lot Patrol	Mockumentary sitcom	June 30, 2026	1 season, 6 episodes	18–22 min	Season 1 ongoing

==== Unscripted ====
===== Docuseries =====
Title	Subject	Premiere	Seasons	Length	Status
The Coach Vick Experience	Sports	February 4, 2026	1 season, 8 episodes	41 min	Pending
OG Stories	Culture	June 17, 2026	1 season, 6 episodes	26–32 min	Pending

===== Reality =====
Title	Genre	Premiere	Seasons	Length	Status
Ms. Pat Settles It	Reality court show	October 18, 2023	3 seasons, 60 episodes	21 min	Renewed

===== Variety =====
Title	Genre	Premiere	Seasons	Length	Status
ComicView: Rooftop Series	Stand-up comedy	June 30, 2026	1 season, 10 episodes	42 min	Renewed
Nick Cannon @ Night	Talk show	October 20, 2026	1 season, 1 episode	42 min	Season 1 ongoing

==== Continuations ====
These shows have been picked up by BET for additional seasons after having aired previous seasons on another network.

Title	Genre	Prev. network(s)	Premiere	Seasons	Length	Status
Tyler Perry's House of Payne (seasons 7–12)	Sitcom	TBS	September 2, 2020	6 seasons, 136 episodes	12–23 min	Pending

==== Music shows ====
- BET Music Playlist (since 1983)
- BET International Playlist (since 1983)

==== Award shows ====
- BET Awards (2001–present)
- BET Hip Hop Awards (2006–present)
- Soul Train Music Awards (2009–present)
- BET Gospel Awards (2005–present)
- NAACP Image Awards (2020–present)

=== Acquired programming ===
- Family Matters (2009–2014; 2023)
- The Fresh Prince of Bel-Air (2008; 2014–present)
- Martin (2015)
- The Jamie Foxx Show (2005–2008; 2009–2016; 2023–2024; 2025–present)
- Tyler Perry's House of Payne (seasons 1–6) (2015)
- Tyler Perry's Meet the Browns (2016)
- The Neighborhood (2020)
- Ruthless (2020)
- First Wives Club (2021)
- American Gangster: Trap Queens (2021)
- The Family Business (2021)
- Celebrity Family Feud (2021–2022; 2023–present)
- Bruh (2022)
- The Game (2022)
- The Ms. Pat Show (2022)
- Kingdom Business (2022)
- All the Queen's Men (2022)
- College Hill: Celebrity Edition (2022)
- Sacrifice (2022)
- The Black Hamptons (2022)
- Zatima (2022)
- I Love Us (2023)
- The Breakfast Club (2023)
- Average Joe (2023)
- Let's Make a Deal (2023)
- Celebrity Squares (2023)
- Diggstown (2024)
- The Michael Blackson Show (2024)
- Tyler Perry's For Better or Worse (2025)
- Pound 4 Pound (2025)
- Beyond the Gates (2026)
- The Jennifer Hudson Show (2026)

== Former programming ==
=== Original programming ===
==== Drama ====
- Being Mary Jane (2013–19)
- Rebel (2017)
- The Quad (2017–18)
- Tales (2017–2022)
- Hit the Floor (2018)
- In Contempt (2018)
- The Family Business (2018) (Note: Moved to BET+)
- American Soul (2019–2020)
- Games People Play (2019–2021)
- The Oval (2019–2026)
- Long Slow Exhale (2022) (Note: Co-production with Spectrum Originals)
- Haus of Vicious (2022)

==== Comedy ====
- The Way We Do It (2001–2002)
- Hey Monie! (2003)
- S.O.B.: Socially Offensive Behavior (2007)
- Somebodies (2008)
- The Game (2011–2015)
- Let's Stay Together (2011–2014)
- Reed Between the Lines (2011)
- Second Generation Wayans (2013)
- Zoe Ever After (2016)
- 50 Central (2017)
- The Comedy Get Down (2017)
- Boomerang (2019–2020)
- Twenties (2020–2021)
- The Hospital (2025)

==== Miniseries ====
- Madiba (2017)
- The New Edition Story (2017)
- The Bobby Brown Story (2018)

==== Docuseries ====
- American Gangster (2006)
- Death Row Chronicles (2018)
- CopWatch America (2019)
- Murder in the Thirst (2019)
- No Limit Chronicles (2020)
- Ruff Ryders Chronicles (2020)
- Boiling Point (2021)
- Disrupt & Dismantle (2021)
- Klutch Academy (2021)
- The Murder Inc Story (2022)
- America in Black (2023–2024)
- Welcome to Rap City (2023)

==== Reality ====
- ComicView (1992–2008, 2014)
- Testimony (2000–2004)
- How I'm Living (2001–2003)
- The Center (2002–2007)
- Coming to the Stage (2003)
- College Hill (2004–2009)
- Ultimate Hustler (2005)
- Lil' Kim: Countdown to Lockdown (2006)
- DMX: Soul of a Man (2006)
- Keyshia Cole: The Way It Is (2006–2008)
- Baldwin Hills (2007–2009)
- Hell Date (2007–2008)
- Sunday Best (2007–2015, 2019–2020)
- Black Poker Stars Invitational (2008)
- Brothers to Brutha (2008)
- Iron Ring (2008)
- Harlem Heights (2009)
- Frankie & Neffe (2009)
- Played by Fame (2009)
- Welcome to Dreamland (2009)
- Tiny and Toya (2009–2010)
- Monica: Still Standing (2009–2010)
- The Family Crews (2010–2011)
- The Michael Vick Project (2010)
- Trey Songz: My Moment (2010)
- Changing Lanes (2010)
- Being Terry Kennedy (2010)
- Toya: A Family Affair (2011)
- Born to Dance: Laurieann Gibson (2011)
- Keyshia & Daniel: Family First (2012)
- Real Husbands of Hollywood (2013–2016)
- Just Keke (2014)
- Nellyville (2014–2015)
- The BET Life of... (2015)
- DeSean Jackson: Home Team (2015)
- It's a Mann's World (2015)
- Keyshia Cole: All In (2015)
- Punk'd (2015)
- The Westbrooks (2015)
- The Xperiment (2015)
- About the Business (2016)
- Chasing Destiny (2016)
- Criminals at Work (2016)
- From the Bottom Up (2016–2018)
- The Gary Owen Show (2016)
- Ink, Paper, Scissors (2016)
- Music Moguls (2016)
- Gucci Mane & Keyshia Ka'oir The Main Event (2017)
- The Grand Hustle (2018)
- Hustle in Brooklyn (2018)
- RAQ Rants (2018)
- Ladies' Night (2019)
- The Next Big Thing (2019)
- Keyshia Cole: My New Life (2019)
- BET Presents: The Encore (2021)
- After Happily Ever After (2022)
- Love & Hip Hop: Miami (2025–2026)

==== Music & award shows ====
- Bobby Jones Gospel (1980–2016)
- Video Soul (1981–1996)
- Video Vibrations (1984–1999)
- Midnight Love (1985–2005)
- Softnotes (1987–1991)
- Video LP (1986–1995)
- Rap City (1989–2008)
- Video Gospel (1989–2011)
- Heart & Soul of R&B (1991–1996)
- Caribbean Rhythms (1993–1998)
- In Your Ear (1995-1996)
- Unreal (1996)
- Hit List (1996–1999)
- Planet Groove (1997–1999)
- Jam Zone/Cita's World (1997–2003)
- Videolink (1999–2000, 2001–2002)
- Hits: From the Streets (1999–2003)
- Lift Every Voice (1999–2024)
- All (1999–2000)
- Out The Box (1999-2000)
- Morning Moves (1999–2000)
- AM @ BET (2000–2001)
- 106 & Park (2000–2014)
- BET Next (2000–2006)
- BET:iNY (2000–2002)
- Access Granted (2001–2019)
- BET: Uncut (2000–2006)
- BET.COM Countdown (2001–2006)
- BET's Top 25 Countdown (2001–2008)
- Celebration of Gospel (2001)
- BET Start (2002–2005; 2006)
- 106 & Park Prime (2003–2004)
- BET Music (2003–2008)
- BET Now (2003–2008)
- The Center (2003–2007)
- BET: After Dark (2005–2007)
- Top 20 Countdown (2005–2013)
- Top 50 Countdown (2005–2006)
- Remixed! (2005–2006)
- Hotwyred (2006)
- The 5ive (2007)
- BET Honors (2008)
- The Deal (2008–2010)
- 106 & Gospel (2009)
- Joyful Noise (2016–2017)
- One Shot (2016–2017)
- Black Girls Rock! (2010)

==== Specials ====
- Spring Bling (1997–2010)
- Notarized (1999–2014)
- Rip the Runway (2005–2013)
- A Very BET Christmas (2010–2011)
- BET News Justice for Us: A BET Town Hall Live (2014)
- Saving Our Selves (2020)
- Black + Iconic (2023)

==== Other ====
- Karen's Kitchen (1982)
- BET Style (2004–2006)
- The Black Carpet (2006–2008)

==== News ====
- This Week in Black Entertainment (1984–1990)
- Screen Scene (1990–1997)
- BET Nightly News (2002–2005)
- Don't Sleep! (2012)

==== Game shows ====
- Nipsey Russell's Juvenile Jury (1983–1984)
- Tell Me Something Good (1988–1989)
- Family Figures (1990)
- Honda Campus All-Star Challenge (1990–1995)
- Love Between the Sexes (1992–1993)
- Triple Threat (1992–1993)
- On the Beat (2001–2002)
- The Road Show (2005)
- Take the Cake (2007)
- Pay It Off (2009–2010)
- Face Value (2017)
- Black Card Revoked (2018)

==== Sports programming ====
- Black College Football (1981–2005)
- ABL on BET (1996–1998)
- BET's MAAD Sports (1998–2000)
- Roc Nation Sports Live Boxing (2015)

==== Talk shows ====
- Teen Summit (1989–2002)
- Oh, Drama! (2000–2001)
- Personal Diary (2005)
- The Mo'Nique Show (2009–2011)
- T.D. Jakes Presents: Mind, Body & Soul (2013)
- Wendy's Style Squad (2016)
- The Rundown with Robin Thede (2017–2018)
- Mancave (2018)
- Twenties After-Show With B. Scott (2021)
- The Wine Down with Mary J. Blige (2023)
- 106 & Sports (2025)

==== Kids & family ====
- Kimboo and Kids (1991–1992)
- Story Porch (1992–1996)
- The Fabulous Reggae Dogs (1995)

=== Syndicated programming ===
==== Drama ====
- I Spy (1984–1986)
- Soul Food (2004–2008)
- The Wire (2006–2008)
- Scandal (2013–2017)
- The Book of Negroes (2015)
- Black&Sexy TV (2015)
- The Breaks (2017)
- The Good Fight (2020)
- All Rise (2020)
- Survivor's Remorse (2021)
- The Chi (2021)
- The Porter (2022)
- Ambitions (2022)
- New York Undercover (2022–2023)

==== Comedy ====
- The Bill Cosby Show (1983–1985)
- Roll Out (1988)
- Soap (1989)
- Baby... I'm Back! (1989–1991)
- Sanford and Son (1989–1991; 1996)
- Desmond's (1989–1993)
- Frank's Place (1990–1991)
- Sanford (1991–1997; 2008)
- Uptown Comedy Club (1992–1994)
- What's Happening!! (1993–1995)
- What's Happening Now!! (1993–1995)
- Roc (1994–1996; 2004)
- Benson (1995–1997)
- Thea (1995–1999; 2008)
- Out All Night (1996)
- 227 (1997–1999)
- Sparks (1998–2000)
- Good News (1999–2000)
- Amen (1999–2001)
- Linc's (2000–2001)
- Fatherhood (2004)
- The Cosby Show (2004–2007)
- In Living Color (2005–2008; 2010)
- The Hughleys (2005–2006; 2009–2024)
- The Wayans Bros. (2005–2008; 2014–2016; 2023)
- A Different World (2008; 2018–2020)
- Diff'rent Strokes (2008)
- Comedy Central Presents (2008)
- Malcolm & Eddie (2008)
- Smart Guy (2008–2009)
- The Steve Harvey Show (2008–2011; 2014; 2019)
- Wild 'n Out (2008; 2014; 2025)
- The Bernie Mac Show (2009–2012; 2017)
- Sister, Sister (2009–2010; 2023)
- City Guys (2010)
- My Wife and Kids (2011–2014; 2023–2024)
- Moesha (2012–2014; 2017)
- Chappelle's Show (2013; 2017)
- The Soul Man (2013)
- Instant Mom (2014)
- The Carmichael Show (2016)
- Eve (2016)
- In the House (2016)
- George Lopez (2017)
- Black-ish (2018–2023)
- Bob Hearts Abishola (2020)
- The Cleveland Show (2020–2021)
- Bigger (2021–2022)
- Living Single (2021–2023; 2025)
- Noah's Arc (2022)

==== Soap operas ====
- Generations (1991–1993)

==== Reality ====
- Run's House (2007)
- Making the Band (2008)
- 50 Cent: The Money and the Power (2008)
- Lip Sync Battle (2016–2017)
- Basketball Wives (2023)
- Basketball Wives: Orlando (2023)

==== News ====
- BET Nightly News
- Dish Nation (2016)
- 48 Hours (2024)

==== Game shows ====
- Family Feud (2014)

==== Talk shows ====
- The Montel Williams Show (2008–2009)
- The Wendy Williams Show (2009–2017) (moved to Bounce TV)
- The Queen Latifah Show (2014–2015)
- The Real (2014–2017) (moved to Bounce TV)

==== Court shows ====
- Judge Karen (2008)
- Judge Hatchett (2008–2009)

==== Kids & family ====
- Just Jordan (2007–2010)
- Romeo! (2007–2008)
- The Proud Family (2008–2009)
- True Jackson, VP (2009)
- Black Panther (2011)
