= Planet Groove =

Planet Groove is a music oriented talk show that premiered in late 1996 on BET, when the short-lived Unreal was cancelled. This show's hostess was Rachel Stuart (who originally hosted Caribbean Rhythms). Like Video Soul, the show had a primetime slot, airing from 8PM-10PM (Eastern Time) as a 2-hour long music video program. It also had a Top-20 countdown on Fridays as well.

== Hour change/New time ==
In late 1997, the show's time slot was changed to 7PM-9PM (Eastern). 1998 saw a decrease in hours, going from two hours to one.

== Cancellation ==
With a decrease in popularity, the show was cancelled in 1999. Planet Groove was somewhat revived when BET launched 106 & Park in 2000. 106 & Park was a top-ten video countdown show that aired live every weekday in the United States and Japan. It was cancelled in 2014.
