= Midnight Love (TV series) =

- Title card, 2003
- Created by: Alvin Jones
- Country of origin: United States

Production
- Running time: 120 minutes

Original release
- Network: BET
- Release: August 10, 1985 – September 3, 2005

Midnight Love is a late-night music video block on the BET network that originally aired from 1985 until 2005. The show's creator, Alvin Jones, occasionally in voiceover, alongside various music artists. It showcased music videos of R&B/Soul ballads and Quiet Storm songs (Slow Jams).

== Format and hosts ==
BET's former VJ/Producer Alvin "THE UNSEEN VJ" Jones was one of the producers of the show. Occasionally, there was a request line where viewers could request their favorite video. Throughout the years Jones was host, there were captions showing that viewers were able to write to the network (in care of Midnight Love) if they wanted to dedicate or request a video to a loved one. By 1992, a 1-900 request line was created for the viewers. In 1994, the dedication line was expanded. Although the show was cancelled in 2005, it was reformed under a new name, BET After Dark. Captain Paul Porter (also "then" host of Video Vibrations) hosted the show for a few years, as well as Sherry Carter.

== Time slots ==
The time slot was often rotated back and forth from 12 a.m. to 1 a.m., but for the most part of the 1990s the show aired Monday to Friday at midnight, and Saturdays at 1:30 a.m. The show's duration also began to change in the late 1990s, going from two hours to one hour. From 1997 through mid–1998, it aired for 90 minutes, while on some Saturdays, it aired for two hours. By the fall of 1998, its duration remained an hour long, until it taken off the air in 2005.
