= Paigion =

American actress

- Born: Kimberly Paigion Walker; September 27, 1986 (age 39); Detroit, Michigan, United States
- Education: Western Michigan University
- Occupations: Media personality, actress, producer
- Known for: Hot 107.5, 106 & Park "MTV2's WorldStar TV"
- Website: www.paigion.com

Kimberly Paigion Walker (born September 27, 1986), better known mononymously as Paigion, is an American actress, radio and television personality. She is best known as the one-fourth of the new set of hosts of BET's 106 & Park from October 1, 2012 through May 2013.

On February 3, 2017, she appeared on MTV2's WorldStar TV. She now films skits and posts them on YouTube.

== Early life ==
Walker was born in Oak Park, Michigan on September 27, 1986, and graduated from Ferndale High School in 2004. She graduated from Western Michigan University with a degree in film and media studies.

== Career ==
=== Radio ===
Walker got her first break in radio as a high school reporter at the urban radio station WJLB ("FM 98"). She later landed a position in the promotions department at the urban radio station WGPR ("Hot 107.5"). where she worked her way into an on-air position. She has also served as a local producer for top radio programs such as, The Tom Joyner Morning Show and The Rickey Smiley Morning Show.

=== Television ===
In November 2011, Paigion received her first shot at television on BET's 106 and Park as a correspondent after a successful screen test. Shortly after, BET extended an offer to host their annual Notarized New Year's Eve video countdown show alongside Shorty da Prince. Paigion went on to make a total of 11 appearances on BET's 106 & Park as a correspondent. On May 29, 2012, Rocsi and Terrence J announced they would be leaving 106 & Park on September 28, 2012. On June 1, 2012, a nationwide search for the next hosts began and ended on October 1, 2012. Walker became one-fourth of the fourth set of hosts for BET's 106 & Park alongside Shorty da Prince, Bow Wow and Miss Mykie on October 1, 2012. She stopped appearing in May 2013.

== Filmography ==
Film
Year	Film	Role	Notes
2012	"Loud Pack" DVD Movie / 'Why Do Men Cheat? The Movie	Stacey	Film Debut
Television
Year	Title	Role	Notes
2012–2013	106 & Park	Herself - Hostess	
