= Miss Mykie =

- Born: Mykel Antoinea Gray; March 28, 1985 (age 41); Denver, Colorado, U.S.
- Other names: Miss Mykie, Mykie, Mykel Gray
- Education: Howard University
- Occupations: Actress, television personality, singer, songwriter
- Years active: 2000–present
- Known for: 106 & Park
- Musical career
- Genres: R&B, hip hop, pop
- Instruments: Vocals, piano
- Website: www.missmykie.com

Mykel Antoinea Gray (born March 28, 1985) known by her stage name, Miss Mykie is an American actress, television personality, and recording artist. Miss Mykie is best known for being one-fourth of the new set of hosts of BET's 106 & Park from October 1, 2012 throughout May 2013. Shortly thereafter Miss Mykie would start her own show. She is credited with launching and hosting, the first ever Instagram show, "The Tea" on July 15, 2013.

== Early life ==
Born as Mykel Antoinea Gray in Denver, Colorado. Gray grew up in a family of seven siblings, where they would put on talent shows or pretend to be their own hosts/contestants of their own game shows in their basement. At the age of 3, she and her family moved to Houston, Texas. At the age of 13, she began to take an interest in music, in the hopes of becoming a singer-songwriter and even formed an all-girl group while she was a freshman in high school. She recalls, "My dad and brother built a studio in our house that I spent countless hours in." Shortly after this, her older brother had become her manager and producer, helping her craft a studio album, which was eventually shelved. She began to perform regularly on local shows and opened up for best-known artists such as Tyrese Gibson, Slim Thug, Sean Paul, among others.

Shortly after graduating from high school, Gray was accepted to the historically black college, Howard University in Washington, D.C., but in the middle of her first year she faced a major tragedy. Her older brother was killed, a few days before his 23rd birthday, and this had a profound effect on Gray. Despite the tragedy she joined the Ooh La La Dance Line for Howard's Showtime Marching Band, and became a soror of the Alpha chapter, Alpha Kappa Alpha sorority. Gray graduated from Howard University in May 2007 with a Bachelor of Fine Arts Degree, in acting.

== Career ==
After graduating from college, Gray taught theater arts at Gregory-Lincoln Education Center in Houston, Texas from August 2007 until June 2012. She resigned as a middle school teacher to pursue careers in television hosting, acting and music. Gray is also an accomplished singer-songwriter, and in 2012, she recorded her debut studio album. She created an industry buzz with over 1 million YouTube hits this year. Gray officially became one-fourth, of the fourth set of hosts for BET's 106 & Park alongside Paigion, Shorty da Prince and Bow Wow. They were officially introduced, as the new hosts, on October 1, 2012. Gray, alongside Johnson and Walker left the show midway through May 2013, with Angela Simmons temporarily replacing them for the remainder of Summer 2013. Miss Mykie is credited with launching and hosting, the first ever Instagram show, "The Tea", originating on July 15, 2013. Miss Mykie is presently the Host of "The Drop", a Russell Simmons production. On December 19, 2014, Mykie makes a triumphant return to BET, hosting the final episode of 106 & Park, titled "The Final Act" alongside Free Marie, Julissa, Rocsi Diaz, and Canadian Keshia Chante.

== Music ==
- 2010: Imma AKA (single)
