= The Black Carpet =

The Black Carpet may refer to:

- The Black Carpet (TV series), an American TV series on BET
- The Black Carpet (album), a 2007 album by Nicky Jam
