= Ax 'Em =

- DVD released by York Entertainment
- Directed by: Michael Mfume
- Written by: Michael Mfume
- Produced by: Michael Mfume
- Starring: Michael Mfume
- Cinematography: Reggie Daniels
- Edited by: George Bolden
- Production company: 2 Smooth Film Productions
- Distributed by: York Entertainment
- Release date: January 29, 1992 (Baltimore)
- Running time: 71 minutes
- Country: United States
- Language: English
- Budget: $400,000

Ax 'Em (originally titled The Weekend It Lives) is a 1992 American slasher film directed by and starring Michael Mfume, son of United States Representative Kweisi Mfume. The film follows a group of friends on a weekend retreat at a remote cabin in the woods who become the targets of a crazed killer.

Ax 'Em is the re-edit of the movie released by York Entertainment in 2003. York changed the tone of the movie, wanting it to be a pure horror movie instead of a horror/comedy. The plot below describes this re-edit, as the original film has never been released on home video.

Though less well known than other famous "bad movies," Ax 'Em is considered a contender for one of the worst movies of all time due to its near-complete failure on every technical level, including an inability to hear significant portions of dialogue, widely varying generation loss across shots, and extremely disjointed, incomprehensible editing.

== Plot ==
In 1990, Mister Mason arrived home from work, armed himself with a shotgun, and proceeded to kill his wife and two of his children. Mister Mason turned the gun on himself, leaving his mentally ill son, Harry Mason, alive. When the police arrived to the scene of the crime, Harry Mason and the bodies of his dead siblings were missing.

In 2003, college student Michael decides to take his girlfriend Kea and their friends to his Granddad's house in the woods for the weekend. Joining Michael and Kea on the trip are Kevin, Michelle and Tonya, along with couples Shawn and Erika, Tony and Kendra, and Rock and Nikki. At Michael’s Granddad's house, a grown up Harry Mason breaks into the house and kills Granddad with an axe.

The next day, the group arrives to the house, with Michael and the others not questioning Granddad's disappearance. At night, around a campfire, Michael recounts the story of the Masons for everyone. Michael explains he was a childhood friend and neighbor to the Mason children growing up. During a search party for Harry 13 years prior, Michael found the bodies of Harry's siblings propped up in his own backyard, but when he ran to get his Granddad, the bodies were gone. The story spooks some of the group, and they all turn in for the night

The next morning, a trio of teenagers late for a class field trip try to catch up with their bus as their car runs out of gas. Sarah stays behind while Brian and Breakfast venture off in the woods to find help. They come across Harry Mason’s old house, and after Breakfast catches the feeling of something being wrong, he runs away. Brian continues to search the house for a phone, only for Harry Mason to come up behind him and smash a rotary phone into his head. By nightfall, Sarah is found and stalked by Harry before she runs away.

Back at Granddad's House, Rock has sneaked off into the woods with Tonya to have sex when Rock is cut by Harry offscreen. Rock and Tonya flee back inside to warn everybody. Harry disables the group's cars, throws Brian's body through the front door, and barges inside to hack and slash Shawn with his machete. The group run off in separate directions as Tonya is struck in the head.

Rock stumbles his way into Harry house, hiding underneath a draped sheet. Nikki arrives shortly after and hides in a closet upstairs. Kevin reaches the area next, having reconvened with Erika offscreen when they are attacked by Harry. Harry hacks the machete into Erika’s head, and proceeds to shoot Kevin to death with one of Granddad’s guns. Nikki discovers the bodies of Harry's siblings in his closet and is confronted by him, but she is saved by Rock. They manage to knock Harry down and they run away together.

Meanwhile, Michael ventures back into his Granddad’s house with Kea to get a gun. In the house, Michael finds his Granddad's body stashed in the closet. Michael and Kea are cornered by Harry in the basement, but Michael shoots him 6 times before they escape through a window.

Tony and Kendra discover a random car battery on the ground, and later come across the locked car of Michael's Granddad. Nikki and Rock reconvene with Tony and Kendra at the car who are soon joined by Michael and Kea. Michael unlocks the car while Tony runs away to get the missing battery that Michael and Kendra came across earlier. Harry appears and chases the others away from the car as he and Michael shoot one another.

Michael, Kea, Nikki, Rock and Kendra sneak into the Mason basement to hide, reconvening with Michelle who hid there too. Harry barges in and the group holds their ground. Michael realizes it's Harry all grown up, but Kea snatches the gun from Michael and shoots him multiple times. Harry gets up and grabs his machete, but not before Michael picks up a pitchfork and stabs him in the chest with it.

Tony comes back to inform them the battery is in the car and they're ready to escape. Everyone runs out while Michael reloads the gun and shoots Harry multiple times. The seven friends escape in the car.

Unbeknownst to them, Harry walks out in the middle of the road behind them, then proceeds to walk back into the woods.

== Cast ==
- Michael Mfume as Michael
- Sandra Pulley as Kea
- Joe Clair as Tony
- Racquel Price as Kendra
- Tracy Wiggs as Rock
- Maria Copper as Nikki
- Kelci Jeter as Tonya
- Greg Jones as Shawn
- Kristine Louisa as Erika
- Fredrick Montgomery as Kevin
- Thomas Hunt as Brian
- D-Taylor Murphy as Breakfast
- Chris Gatewood as Granddad
- Archie Williams as Harry Mason
- Julia Gorin as Sarah
- Arthur M. Jolly as Mother Killed

== Production ==
Michael Mfume wrote, directed, produced, and starred in the film with no experience, contacts or money for production. Eventually Mfume managed to accrue $400,000 from a group of investors while also accepting help from friends and family such as Mfume's mother providing craft services and his father also donating some money. The film was shot in 15 days over a four-month period in Baltimore, Maryland at Morgan State University, Ashburton, Walbrook Junction and Druid Hill Park. The cast consisted of amateur actors who were mostly friends of Mfume's from Morgan State. Mfume also had interviews and screenings for the film setup with The Walt Disney Company, Columbia Pictures, and Warner Bros., which John Singleton helped set up after meeting with Mfume. When Mfume spoke of his aspirations for the film, he was quoted:

When you think of horror films in the '90s, you going to think of Michael Mfume.

After finding no distributors and still using its original title of The Weekend it Lives, the film had a very short theatrical run in Baltimore, Maryland in 1992, before falling into complete obscurity.

11 years later in 2003, York Entertainment purchased the home video rights for The Weekend It Lives. Wanting to market it as a straight horror film, a large re-edit took place with scenes that are now incomplete, out of order, or missing entirely leaving much of the film incoherent. Furthermore, the film was renamed Ax 'Em. The original film had a comedic-horror parody tone rather than straight horror, which can still be seen in the re-edit.

It is unknown if any prints of the original version still exist.

== Reception ==
Critical reception for Ax 'Em has been overwhelmingly negative, and Beyond Hollywood opined that the film was "one of the most visually atrocious films I’ve come across in a long, long time." Something Awful gave it a rating of -48, commenting "How do you review a movie so unfit for public viewing that you can't even figure out any of the characters' names?" I-Mockery criticized the film heavily in one of their movie spotlights, remarking "At the end of the credits, the word, "peace" is shown. Never have I seen a stronger case for war."

A contemporary review of the film's original release (as The Weekend It Lives) was slightly more positive. Writing for The Baltimore Sun, reviewer Stephen Hunter commented that the film initially showed some promise but that "Once the killings begin, the movie ceases to generate much interest."
