= Madelyne Woods =

American television personality

Madelyne Woods is a cable television personality who appeared on BET throughout the 1990s. She completed undergraduate at University of Maryland at College Park graduating with a Bachelor of Science degree in Journalism in 1986. She completed her master's degree in Mass Communication at Howard University, graduating in 1987. Not long after joining BET, she was anchoring the BET Newsbriefs, one-minute news updates that aired during program breaks. Over the span of her career at BET, she was assigned to various news / interview shows, including the opportunity to host Video LP as Sherry Carter transitioned into hosting Video Soul, the flagship prime-time entertainment program for the network.

Although not specifically tied to any rap-formatted show on BET, Woods maintained popularity within the hip hop community. She was immortalized in the lyrics of the Tribe Called Quest song "Electric Relaxation":

"Not to come across as a thug or a hood, But hon, you got the goods, like Madelyne Woods"
