= Joe Clair =

American comedian and actor

- Born: Joe Clair; February 13, 1969 (age 56); Seat Pleasant, Maryland, U.S.
- Occupation(s): stand-up comedian, radio personality, VJ and actor
- Years active: 1992–present

Joe Clair (born February 13, 1969), also known by the nickname "Joe Cleezy", is an American stand-up comedian, radio personality, VJ and actor. He is a native of the Seat Pleasant, Maryland suburb of Washington, D.C.

== Career ==
Clair is best known as a former host of BET's Rap City from 1994 to 1999. He hosted his own morning drive time show on WPGC-FM in Washington, D.C. from 5:50am-10am.

Clair earned a bachelor's degree in psychology from Morgan State University in Baltimore, Maryland. Aside from his work as host of Rap City, Clair has also hosted several radio shows and appeared on the stand-up comedy shows Def Comedy Jam and ComicView. Clair was named morning drive time host at WPGC-FM in his hometown of Washington, D.C., in February 2015 to July 2021.

As an actor, Clair has appeared in several films, most notably the 1992 horror film Ax 'Em, where he plays the role of Tony.

== Filmography ==
=== Film ===
Year	Title	Role	Notes
1992	Ax 'Em	Tony	
1998	High Freakquency	MC Nappy	
2000	Train Ride	Keith	
2007	Lord Help Us	Julius 'Jewels' Vernon	Video
2009	The Greatest Song	Kyle	
2010	Who Da Man?	Alvin	Short
2010	Major Player	Jay Evans	Short
2011	He Said, She Said: A Romantic Comedy	John	Video
2020	Holiday Heartbreak	Al	TV movie

=== Television ===
Year	Title	Role	Notes
1994–1999	Rap City	Himself/Host	Main Host
1995	Snaps	Himself	Episode: "Episode #1.2"
1999	Girls Nite Out	Himself/Host	Main Host
2001–2004	MADD Sports	Himself/Host	Recurring Host
2002	Comic Groove	Himself	Episode: "Episode #1.3"
2005	The War at Home	Officer	Episode: "Dave Get Your Gun"
2005–2009	1st Amendment Stand Up	Himself	Recurring Guest
2006	Def Comedy Jam	Himself	Episode: "Episode #7.9"
2007	106 & Park	Himself/Judge	Episode: "The Hip Hop Weekend"
2007	Take the Cake	Himself/Host	Main Host
2008	ComicView	Himself	Episode: "ComicView: One Mic Stand"
2009	Comics Unleashed	Himself	Episode: "November 23, 2009"
2009–2010	Greek	Fire Marshall	Guest Cast: Season 2-3
2011	Comedy All-Stars	Himself/Host	Main Host
2014	Comics Unleashed	Himself	Episode: "May 15, 2014"
2018	We Are Washington	Himself	Episode: "202 Creates & Dog Tag Bakery"
2022	The Real Housewives of Potomac	Himself	Episode: "Show Time!"
2023	Welcome to Rap City	Himself	Episode: "The Notorious Basement"
