= Family Time (TV series) =

American television sitcom (2012–2020)

- Genre: Sitcom
- Created by: Bentley Kyle Evans
- Starring: Omar Gooding; Angell Conwell; Jayla Calhoun; Bentley Kyle Evans Jr.
- Country of origin: United States
- Original language: English
- No. of seasons: 8
- No. of episodes: 91

Production
- Executive producers: Bentley Kyle Evans; Trenten Gumbs; Elizabeth Kealoha; Ri-Karlo Handy; Richard Gumbs III
- Running time: 22 minutes
- Production companies: Bent Outta Shape Productions; 3G Films; Harvest Studios; Bounce Original Production

Original release
- Network: Bounce TV
- Release: June 18, 2012 – December 16, 2020

Family Time is an American television sitcom that was created by Bentley Kyle Evans, and aired on Bounce TV from June 18, 2012, to December 16, 2020. It stars Omar Gooding and Angell Conwell as Anthony and Lisa Stallworth, a working-class family bumped to the middle class by a winning lottery ticket. It was the first original series for the network.

The first season has six episodes and aired in the summer of 2012. The 10-episode second season aired from October 14, 2014, to December 14, 2014. On May 7, 2015, the series was renewed for a third season that aired from October 6, 2015, to December 8, 2015. On April 13, 2016, the show was renewed for a fourth season, airing from October 4, 2016, to December 27, 2016. On August 3, 2017, the show was renewed for a fifth season, that premiered on October 3, 2017. The series was renewed for a sixth season and premiered on October 1, 2018. The series has also been renewed for a 13 episode-seventh season, that premiered on October 9, 2019. On August 11, the series was renewed for an eighth and final season, airing from October 7, 2020, to December 16, 2020.

== Premise ==
After a construction worker gets lucky, winning $500,000 on a lottery scratch-off ticket, he suddenly find himself and his wife launched into middle-class society, and decide to move with their two young children into a new neighborhood.

== Cast and characters ==
=== Regular cast ===
- Omar Gooding as Anthony "Tony" Stallworth
- Angell Conwell as Lisa Calloway-Stallworth
- Jayla Calhoun as Ebony Stallworth, Lisa and Tony's daughter
- Bentley Kyle Evans Jr. as Devin Stallworth, Lisa and Tony's son

=== Recurring cast ===
- Tanjareen Thomas as Rachel Calloway, Lisa's sassy younger lesbian sister
- Paula Jai Parker as Lori Calloway-Wilson, Lisa's older sister
- Clayton Thomas as Donnie
- Rodney Perry as Rodney
- Chris Williams and Erica Shaffer as Todd (Season 1-2 for Todd) and Vivian Stallworth, Tony's well-to-do brother and Caucasian sister-in-law
- Richard Gant and Judyann Elder as Darius and Beverly Stallworth, Tony's parents
- Shanti Lowry as Cheryl
- KJ Smith as Melinda (season 3–6)
- Teresa Topnotch as Brandy (season 7–8)

Guest stars also include Lynn Whitfield, Lawrence Hilton-Jacobs, Jackée Harry, Dorian Gregory, and Michelle Williams.

== Episodes ==
=== Series overview ===
Season	Episodes	Originally released	
Season	Episodes	First released	Last released
1	6	June 18, 2012	July 23, 2012
2	10	October 14, 2014	December 14, 2014
3	10	October 6, 2015	December 8, 2015
4	13	October 4, 2016	December 27, 2016
5	13	October 2, 2017	December 18, 2017
6	13	October 1, 2018	December 17, 2018
7	13	October 9, 2019	December 30, 2019
8	13	October 7, 2020	December 16, 2020

=== Season 1 (2012) ===
No. overall	No. in season	Title	Directed by	Written by	Original release date
1	1	"There Goes the Neighborhood" "Pilot"	Bentley Kyle Evans	Bentley Kyle Evans	June 18, 2012
2	2	"No Happy Ending"	Bentley Kyle Evans	Wayne D. Stamps	June 25, 2012
3	3	"The Note"	Bentley Kyle Evans	Nile Evans	July 2, 2012
4	4	"The Tennis Bracelet"	Bentley Kyle Evans	David L. Moses	July 9, 2012
5	5	"When a Woman's Fed Up"	Bentley Kyle Evans	Stacey Evans Morgan	July 16, 2012
6	6	"Gray Area"	Bentley Kyle Evans	Bentley Kyle Evans	July 23, 2012

=== Season 2 (2014) ===
No. overall	No. in season	Title	Directed by	Written by	Original release date
7	1	"The First Rule About Fight Night Is You Don’t Talk About Night"	Bentley Kyle Evans	Alex Kavutskiy	October 14, 2014
8	2	"The Will"	Bentley Kyle Evans	Leo J. Lawrence	October 21, 2014
9	3	"No New Friends"	Bentley Kyle Evans	Rachelle Williams-BenAry	October 28, 2014
10	4	"Hospitality"	Bentley Kyle Evans	Bentley Kyle Evans	November 4, 2014
11	5	"No Lie Zone"	Bentley Kyle Evans	Stacey Evans Morgan	November 11, 2014
12	6	"Lisa’s Leftovers"	Bentley Kyle Evans	Andre Akil	November 18, 2014
13	7	"Powering Down"	Bentley Kyle Evans	B.J. Therman	November 25, 2014
14	8	"The Oops Baby"	Bentley Kyle Evans	Clayton Thomas	December 2, 2014
15	9	"Cut It Out"	Bentley Kyle Evans	Nile Evans	December 9, 2014
16	10	"Hobby Hunters"	Bentley Kyle Evans	Bentley Kyle Evans & Alex Kavutskiy	December 16, 2014

=== Season 3 (2015) ===
No. overall	No. in season	Title	Directed by	Written by	Original release date
17	1	"Slide Hustles"	Bentley Kyle Evans	Nile Evans	October 6, 2015
18	2	"Forbidden Fruits"	Bentley Kyle Evans	Leo J. Lawrence	October 13, 2015
19	3	"The Help"	Bentley Kyle Evans	Bentley Kyle Evans	October 20, 2015
20	4	"Salt N Pepa N Spice"	Bentley Kyle Evans	Bentley Kyle Evans	October 27, 2015
21	5	"What's Ours Is Mine"	Bentley Kyle Evans	Bentley Kyle Evans	November 3, 2015
22	6	"Troop Dad"	Bentley Kyle Evans	Stacey Evans Morgan	November 10, 2015
23	7	"Air RNB"	Bentley Kyle Evans	Michael Anthony Snowden	November 17, 2015
24	8	"Kissing Cousins"	Bentley Kyle Evans	Alex Kavutskiy	November 24, 2015
25	9	"Bright House, Big Dusty House"	Bentley Kyle Evans	Alex Kavutskiy	December 1, 2015
26	10	"What Happens After Vegas"	Bentley Kyle Evans	Alex Kavutskiy	December 8, 2015

=== Season 4 (2016) ===
No. overall	No. in season	Title	Directed by	Written by	Original release date
27	1	"She’s Got Game"	Bentley Kyle Evans	Jay Phillips	October 4, 2016
28	2	"The Things We Do for Love"	Bentley Kyle Evans	Bentley Kyle Evans & Alex Kavutskiy	October 11, 2016
29	3	"Pushing Buttons"	Bentley Kyle Evans	Bentley Kyle Evans & Alex Kavutskiy	October 18, 2016
30	4	"Head of House"	Bentley Kyle Evans	Bentley Kyle Evans & Alex Kavutskiy	October 25, 2016
31	5	"Unhappy Anniversary"	Bentley Kyle Evans	Bentley Kyle Evans & Alex Kavutskiy	November 1, 2016
32	6	"Stallworth vs Stallworth vs Stallworth"	Bentley Kyle Evans	Bentley Kyle Evans & Alex Kavutskiy	November 8, 2016
33	7	"No Place Like Home"	Bentley Kyle Evans	Bentley Kyle Evans & Alex Kavutskiy	November 15, 2016
34	8	"Thanks for Giving"	Bentley Kyle Evans	Bentley Kyle Evans & Alex Kavutskiy	November 22, 2016
35	9	"Daddie Donnie"	Bentley Kyle Evans	Bentley Kyle Evans & Alex Kavutskiy	November 29, 2016
36	10	"Every Cloud Has A Silver Lining"	Bentley Kyle Evans	Alex Kavutskiy	December 6, 2016
37	11	"Girls' Getaway"	Bentley Kyle Evans	Unknown	December 13, 2016
38	12	"Merry Kwanzaa"	Bentley Kyle Evans	Angell Conwell & Redaric Williams	December 17, 2018
39	13	"Sick of This"	Bentley Kyle Evans	Bentley Kyle Evans & Alex Kavutskiy	December 27, 2016

=== Season 5 (2017) ===
No. overall	No. in season	Title	Directed by	Written by	Original release date
40	1	"Rich Donnie"	Bentley Kyle Evans	Unknown	October 2, 2017
41	2	"Social Media"	Bentley Kyle Evans	Jazmen Darnell Brown and Chazman T. Rodgers	October 9, 2017
42	3	"Reunited and It Feels So Good"	Bentley Kyle Evans	Alex Kavutskiy	October 16, 2017
43	4	"Let Cheatin' Dogs Lie"	Bentley Kyle Evans	Bentley Kyle Evans and KyLee Evans and Liana Mendoza	October 23, 2017
44	5	"Halloween Time"	Bentley Kyle Evans	Alex Kavutskiy	October 30, 2017
45	6	"They’re Shooting"	Bentley Kyle Evans	Unknown	November 6, 2017
46	7	"Stalking for Love"	Bentley Kyle Evans	Unknown	November 13, 2017
47	8	"No Thanksgiving"	Bentley Kyle Evans	Charles Allen Burney and Omar Gooding and Jamie Nieto	November 20, 2017
48	9	"Cheer Up"	Bentley Kyle Evans	Patricia Cuffie-Jones	November 27, 2017
49	10	"Cold Feet"	Bentley Kyle Evans	Alex Kavutskiy	December 4, 2017
50	11	"Love Tat"	Bentley Kyle Evans	Stacey Evans Morgan	December 11, 2017
51	12	"College Bound"	Bentley Kyle Evans	Bentley Kyle Evans and Alex Kavutskiy	December 18, 2017
65	13	"Secret Stallworth"	Bentley Kyle Evans	Bentley Kyle Evans and Alex Kavutskiy	December 18, 2017

=== Season 6 (2018) ===
No. overall	No. in season	Title	Directed by	Written by	Original release date
53	1	"Black & White"	Bentley Kyle Evans	Bentley Kyle Evans & Alex Kauvtskiy	October 1, 2018
54	2	"The Aftermath"	Bentley Kyle Evans	Patricia Cuffie-Jones	October 8, 2018
55	3	"Happy Homecoming"	Bentley Kyle Evans	Stacey Evans Morgan	October 15, 2018
56	4	"Mancrush"	Bentley Kyle Evans	Bentley Kyle Evans & Alex Kauvtskiy	October 22, 2018
57	5	"The Good Neighbors"	Bentley Kyle Evans	KyLee Evans and Liana Mendoza and Oren Williams	October 29, 2018
58	6	"Kick Rocks"	Bentley Kyle Evans	Bentley Kyle Evans & Alex Kauvtskiy	November 5, 2018
59	7	"It’s About To Be Lit"	Bentley Kyle Evans	Jazmen Darnell Brown & Chazman T. Rodgers	November 12, 2018
60	8	"Jive Turkey Day"	Bentley Kyle Evans	Kylee Evans	November 19, 2018
61	9	"Work Wife, Unhappy Life"	Bentley Kyle Evans	Stacey Evans Morgan	November 26, 2018
62	10	"Doctor Dad"	Bentley Kyle Evans	Clayton Thomas	December 3, 2018
63	11	"Roots"	Bentley Kyle Evans	Bentley Kyle Evans & Alex Kauvtskiy	December 10, 2018
64	12	"Stallworths for Real"	Bentley Kyle Evans	Jay Phillips	December 17, 2018
65	13	"Scrooge"	Bentley Kyle Evans	Omar Gooding and Jazmen Darnell Brown & Chazman T. Rodgers	December 17, 2018

=== Season 7 (2019) ===
No. overall	No. in season	Title	Directed by	Written by	Original release date
66	1	"Guess Who’s Back"	Bentley Kyle Evans	Liana Mendoza & Markell Palmer	October 9, 2019
67	2	"Goin' All In"	Bentley Kyle Evans	Liana Mendoza and Oren Williams and Zachary Isaiah Williams	October 9, 2019
68	3	"Ya'll"	Bentley Kyle Evans	KyLee Evans and Oren Williams	October 16, 2019
69	4	"Black Love"	Bentley Kyle Evans	Jamie Nieto	October 23, 2019
70	5	"Age Ain’t Nothin' But a Number"	Bentley Kyle Evans	Unknown	October 30, 2019
71	6	"Beyond The Stars"	Bentley Kyle Evans	Bentley Kyle Evans	November 6, 2019
72	7	"No New Friends"	Bentley Kyle Evans	Liana Mendoza and Jennelle Williams	November 13, 2019
73	8	"Sweet Tooth Tony"	Bentley Kyle Evans	Julian Alston and Liana Mendoza and Jamie Nieto	November 20, 2019
74	9	"A Night to Remember"	Bentley Kyle Evans	KyLee Evans	November 27, 2019
75	10	"Working Day and Night"	Bentley Kyle Evans	Miranda Bowden and Kira Talise	December 4, 2019
76	11	"Bro Code"	Bentley Kyle Evans	Unknown	December 11, 2019
77	12	"We Are Family"	Bentley Kyle Evans	Chazman T. Rodgers	December 18, 2019
78	13	"No Stallworth Child Left Behind"	Bentley Kyle Evans	Liana Mendoza and Stacey Evans Morgan	December 18, 2019

=== Season 8 (2020) ===
No. overall	No. in season	Title	Directed by	Written by	Original release date
79	1	"Empty Nest"	Bentley Kyle Evans	Unknown	October 7, 2020
80	2	"Show Me The Money"	Bentley Kyle Evans	Jamie Nieto	October 7, 2020
81	3	"The Set-Ups"	Bentley Kyle Evans	Unknown	October 14, 2020
82	4	"Somebody’s Watching Me"	Bentley Kyle Evans	Unknown	October 21, 2020
83	5	"Notorious D.O.G."	Bentley Kyle Evans	Unknown	October 28, 2020
84	6	"Teamwork Makes The Dream Work"	Bentley Kyle Evans	Chazman T. Rodgers	November 4, 2020
85	7	"The Breadwinner"	Bentley Kyle Evans	Julian Alston & Ryan Lumas	November 11, 2020
86	8	"Thanks For The Ticket"	Bentley Kyle Evans	Liana Mendoza and Jennelle Williams	November 18, 2020
87	9	"Grass Ain’t Greener"	Bentley Kyle Evans	Liana Mendoza and Oren Williams and Zachary Isaiah Williams	November 25, 2020
88	10	"Daddy Divorce"	LaMonte Evans II and Bentley Kyle Evans	Markell Palmer	November 25, 2020
89	11	"Blasts from the Past"	Bentley Kyle Evans	Miranda Bowden and Kira Talise	December 9, 2020
90	12	"Christmas Beyond the Walls"	Bentley Kyle Evans	Stacey Evans Morgan	December 16, 2020
91	13	"Stallworth Murder Mystery"	Bentley Kyle Evans	Zachary Isaiah Williams	December 16, 2020
