= DJ Megatron =

American disc jockey

- Also known as: Mega, Mega McGriff
- Born: Corey McGriff; August 11, 1978
- Origin: Staten Island, New York
- Died: March 27, 2011 (aged 33)
- Genres: Hip hop
- Occupations: DJ, Record producer Rapper, Radio personality, Television personality
- Instruments: Turntable, Sampler
- Years active: 1988—2011
- Website: DJ Megatron on Myspace

Corey McGriff (August 11, 1978 – March 27, 2011), better known as DJ Megatron, was a DJ, record producer, rapper, radio and television personality.

== Career ==
McGriff broadcast hip hop, R&B and urban music through various radio stations in a number of cities in the United States including initially as an intern at New York's WRKS-FM (also known as Kiss FM) as an on-air sidekick of popular personality Fatman Scoop, then for two years at Boston's WBOT-FM (Hot 97.7) and for two-and-one-half years at Philadelphia's WPHI-FM (The Beat).

He was also part of the Black Entertainment Television (BET) television station's "106 & Park" countdown show with his popular segment entitled "What's Good". He was also the host of BET's "On Blast" Internet show.

McGriff was a promoter of local artists from Staten Island. He also appeared in a number of films, including most notably, State Property 2, Blood of a Champion and Killa Season.

== Personal life ==
McGriff was engaged to fiancée Shyleen and he had three children.

== Death ==
On March 27, 2011, McGriff was shot to the chest. Two New York City men, William Williams, 21, and Richard Cromwell, 20, were arrested on April 6, 2011, on charges of murder, robbery and criminal weapon possession in relation to his death. On January 8, 2013, William Williams pleaded guilty to first degree manslaughter. He was sentenced to 21 years in prison.
