= Rachel Stuart =

Jamaican-Canadian model and television host (born 1972)

Rachel Stuart (born 1972) is a Jamaican-Canadian model, actress, tv host and beauty pageant titleholder.

== Personal life ==
Stuart attended Mohawk College. Rachel Stuart is married to Paxton Baker, former vice president of BET Digital Networks and has three children.

== Career ==
Stuart is a former Miss Caraïbes and Miss Universe Jamaica and represented her country at Miss Universe 1993. She is best known for her work as hostess of two programs on BET, the BET network: Caribbean Rhythms, a music video show showcasing musicians from Caribbean nations; and Planet Groove, a music video show that was similar to Video Soul. She also had brief spots on Video Soul as a guest hostess. In 1999, she was a co-hostess of BET's Live From LA (with Michael Colyar). She has hosted "Island Stylee" an award-winning inflight program on Air Jamaica.
