= Video LP =

US television program

Video LP is a half-hour, live viewer call-in program that debuted on September 1, 1986 on BET (when Video Soul and Video Vibrations were expanded). It primarily showcased R&B/Soul and Hip-Hop music videos. The original hostess was Robin Breedon, but the most well-known host was Sherry Carter from 1989 until 1992, when she moved on to co-host Video Soul from 1992–1996). Madelyne Woods also served as hostess for a short time.

The primary format of the live show was Carter introducing a theme for the show in the intro. Throughout the rest of the episode, videos were played that related to the theme, and Carter would typically take viewer calls to get their opinions on the music that was featured. Themes included:

- “Kiss It or Diss It”: viewers would critique (approve or dismiss) new videos that were being debut on Video LP.
- “Artist vs Artist”: Carter would spotlight two artists / groups with similar styles, and callers would vote for which artist they favored.
- “Music-style show”: featured music from a particular genre, such as Dancehall, or a particular artist like Bob Marley in honor of his birthday.
- “Artist Interview”: Carter would have an artist as an in-studio guest, and would interview them as well as take calls from viewers; the artist typically would be there to promote new music.
- “Holiday edition”: these episodes were aired on a particular holiday, such as Independence Day where the hostess and crew did the show from the studio outdoor patio, complete with a BBQ.

Many viewers of Video LP looked forward to the outfit that Carter or Woods would be wearing during an episode, thus making it one of the few shows on BET where the fashion sense of the hostess/wardrobe stylist was prominent.
