= Softnotes =

US television program

Softnotes is a multi-hour music television program created for BET. It debuted in 1987, and was created and produced by Alvin Jones (THE UNSEEN VJ), the former host of Video Vibrations. This program focused on the genre known as Smooth Jazz, mixing up R&B, Soft Rock, & Easy Listening videos. This also showed the growing diversity of BET, and paved the way for other Jazz-dedicated shows like Sound & Style with Ramsey Lewis and Jazz Central. Eventually, the program spun off the BET on Jazz digital cable channel, which is currently BET Her. Softnotes remained on the air until 1991, and Paul Porter (Alvin Jones' successor for Video Vibrations) would host the remainder of the show until it went off the air in mid-late 1991.

Artists like Anita Baker, Kenny G, Najee, Jeff Lorber, Freddie Jackson, and others had their music videos shown on the program.
