= Angell Conwell =

American actress (born 1983)

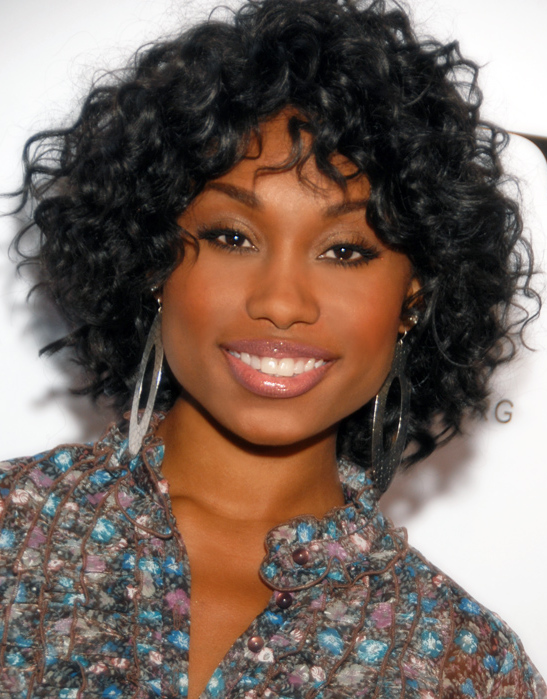
- Conwell attending a Susan G. Komen for the Cure event in 2009
- Born: August 2, 1983 (age 42); Orangeburg, South Carolina, U.S.
- Occupation: Actress
- Years active: 1994–present

Angell Conwell (born August 2, 1983) is an American actress. She is known for her roles as Leslie Michaelson in the CBS daytime soap opera, The Young and the Restless and Lisa Stallworth in the Bounce TV sitcom Family Time. In film, she appeared in Baby Boy (2001) and starred as Veronica on Bigger.

== Personal life ==
Conwell was born in Orangeburg, South Carolina and moved to Columbia, South Carolina at the age of 2. She attended Seven Oaks Elementary School in Columbia where she became the first Black American student body president. She later attended Irmo Middle School in Columbia, South Carolina briefly before relocating to Los Angeles, California. Conwell went on to attend Valley View, Glendale High School, where she was a cheerleader and member of both the Student Body Association and Drama Club. She then attended Glendale Community College also in Glendale.

== Career ==
In 1994, Conwell moved to Los Angeles to film the TV pilot On Our Own. She later was cast in a recurring role in the CBS sitcom Dave's World, and has appeared in a number of sitcoms, including Sabrina the Teenage Witch, The Parkers, One on One and Cuts. In 2001, Conwell made her film debut in the coming-of-age drama Baby Boy starring opposite Omar Gooding. She later appeared in films such as The Wash (2001) and Soul Plane (2004).

In 2010, Conwell was cast as attorney Leslie Michaelson in the CBS daytime soap opera, The Young and the Restless. Conwell first appeared in the role of Leslie Michaelson on December 2, 2010, in a recurring status. Conwell auditioned for the role because her "entire family watches the show", explaining, "the character was one that I really wanted to play. When I went to the audition, I just really felt it and I think it came off in the audition. I really enjoy working with the cast. They are such great actors which I don't think a lot of people realize. The whole experience has been just great". In December 2012, after two years in a recurring role, Conwell was placed on contract by Bell's successor, Jill Farren Phelps. However, she was returned to recurring status in August 2014. Conwell made her last appearance as Leslie on June 22, 2017, but returned in April 2019 in a brief guest appearance to honor Kristoff St. John's and his character.

In 2012, Conwell was cast in a leading role alongside Omar Gooding in the Bounce TV sitcom Family Time. In 2019, she began starring in the BET+ comedy-drama series Bigger. Angell was honored with receiving the Key to the City of Columbia, South Carolina; her hometown by the Mayor Steven Benjamin on February 5, 2019. A day which the Mayor also deemed as Angell Conwell Day.

== Filmography ==
=== Film ===
Year	Title	Role	Notes
2001	Flossin	Vanessa	
2001	Web Girl	Natalie	TV movie
2001	Baby Boy	Kim	
2001	The Wash	Antoinette	
2002	What About Your Friends: Weekend Getaway	Alex	TV movie
2002	BraceFace Brandi	Tonya	Short
2004	Soul Plane	Tamika	
2004	Sugar Valentine	Naomi	
2005	Rhythm City Volume One: Caught Up	Herself	Video
2006	Confessions	Cathy Johnson	
2007	Half Past Dead 2	Cherise Powell	Video
2008	Show Stoppers	Pam	
2008	Who's Deal?	Brenda	
2008	Jury of Our Peers	Kayla	
2008	Love For Sale	Sida	
2009	Portal	Vanya	Video
2009	There's a Stranger in my House	Chelsea	
2009	Frankenhood	Sabrina	
2009	The Killing of Wendy	Toya	
2010	Sex Tax: Based on a True Story	Eve	
2010	Perfect Combination	Alex	
2012	Back Then	Natalie Devine	
2013	24 Hour Love	Sherri	
2014	The Divorce	CeCe Massey	TV movie
2014	4Play	Shanice	
2014	Lyfe's Journey	Tricia Lyfe	TV movie
2015	Touched	Nikki	
2015	The Good, the Bad, and the Dead	Agent Taylor	
2016	Ladies Book Club	Bunny	TV movie
2016	Merry Ex-Mas	Katrina Jackson	TV movie
2017	Message from a Mistress	Jessa Bell	
2018	The Sky Princess	Sizani	
2019	Caretakers	Dr. Leigh Waters	

=== Television ===
Year	Title	Role	Notes
1994–96	Dave's World	Carly	Recurring Cast
1995	Renegade	Jackie	Episode: "Repo Raines"
1996	The Faculty	Marcy	Episode: "Carlos Garcia"
1996	Party Girl	Schoolgirl	Episode: "Just Say No"
1998	Sabrina the Teenage Witch	Student #1	Episode: "You Bet Your Family"
2000	NYPD Blue	Sugar Griffin	Episode: "Goodbye Charlie"
2000	The Parkers	Passion	Episode: "Unforgiven"
2000	3rd Rock from the Sun	Girl #1	Episode: "The Big Giant Head Returns Again: Part 1 & 2"
2001	Moesha	Melony	Episode: "Saving Private Rita"
2001	City Guys	Kianna	Recurring Cast: Season 5
2003	That's So Raven	Andrea	Episode: "Dissin' Cousins"
2003	One on One	Amanda	Episode: "2 Young, 2 Curious"
2003	My Wife and Kids	Tiffany	Episode: "While Out"
2006	Cuts	Crystal	Episode: "Strictly Biz-Nass 2: Biz Nastier"
2010-19	The Young and the Restless	Leslie Michaelson	Regular Cast
2012-13	For Richer or Poorer	Paige	Main Cast
2012-20	Family Time	Lisa Calloway-Stallworth	Main Cast
2013	Real Husbands of Hollywood	Bridgette	Episode: "Auf Wiedersehen, Mitches" & "Hollywood Scuffle"
2014	Rush	Tasha	Episode: "Pilot"
2015	Unsung Hollywood	Herself	Episode: "Baby Boy"
2015	Get Your Life	Lady in Thespian	Episode: "Girl Get Your Blacktresses"
2017	Rosewood	Keke Fairbanks	Episode: "Mummies & Meltdowns"
2018	Nobodies	Actress Jen	Recurring Cast: Season 2
2019-21	Bigger	Veronica Yates	Main Cast

== Awards and nominations ==
Year	Award	Work	Result	Ref
2001	Locarno International Film Festival	Baby Boy	Won	
2013	NAACP Image Award for Outstanding Actress in a Daytime Drama Series	The Young and the Restless	Nominated	
2014	NAACP Image Award for Outstanding Actress in a Daytime Drama Series	The Young and the Restless	Nominated	
2019	Pinnacle Film Award for Best Supporting Actress	Caretakers	Won	

In 2019, Conwell was given the Key to the City of Columbia, South Carolina by Mayor Steven Benjamin.
