= Jacque Reid =

American television and radio personality and journalist

- Born: Jacqueline Elaine Reid; Atlanta, Georgia
- Occupations: Television host, journalist

Jacqueline Elaine "Jacque" Reid is an American television and radio personality and journalist. She was the lead news anchor of The BET Nightly News from 2001 to 2005. Reid is currently one of the co-hosts of the NBC New York affiliate show called "New York Live." She has also guest-hosted The View several times, prior to joining NBC 4 New York.

== Early career and education ==
Reid began her journalism career as an anchor/reporter for WBSG-TV in Brunswick, Georgia and at CBS affiliate WKYT-TV in Lexington, Kentucky. Later, she joined KPRC-TV, the NBC affiliate in Houston, Texas. After her stint in Houston, she anchored the morning news at CNN Headline News.

Reid attended the University of Georgia before transferring to Clark Atlanta University where she earned a Bachelor of Arts degree in print journalism and a Master's degree in Broadcast journalism from Northwestern University in 1991. She is an active member of the National Association of Black Journalists. She is also a member of Delta Sigma Theta sorority.

== Personal ==
Reid was raised in Atlanta, Georgia, graduating from Southwest Dekalb High School in 1985 and is a health and fitness enthusiast. She has said that she would like to have children. Reid maintains a busy work schedule that includes the public speaking circuit.
