= Video Gospel =

- Country of origin: United States
- Original language: English

Original release
- Network: BET
- Release: 1989 – 2011

Video Gospel is a television series that aired on BET featuring gospel music videos. It began airing during the 1989 season. It also aired from 2000 to 2005 and 2010–2011. It originally began airing as the companion series to Video Soul, which aired on BET from 1981 to 1996.
