= Tanjareen Thomas =

American actress

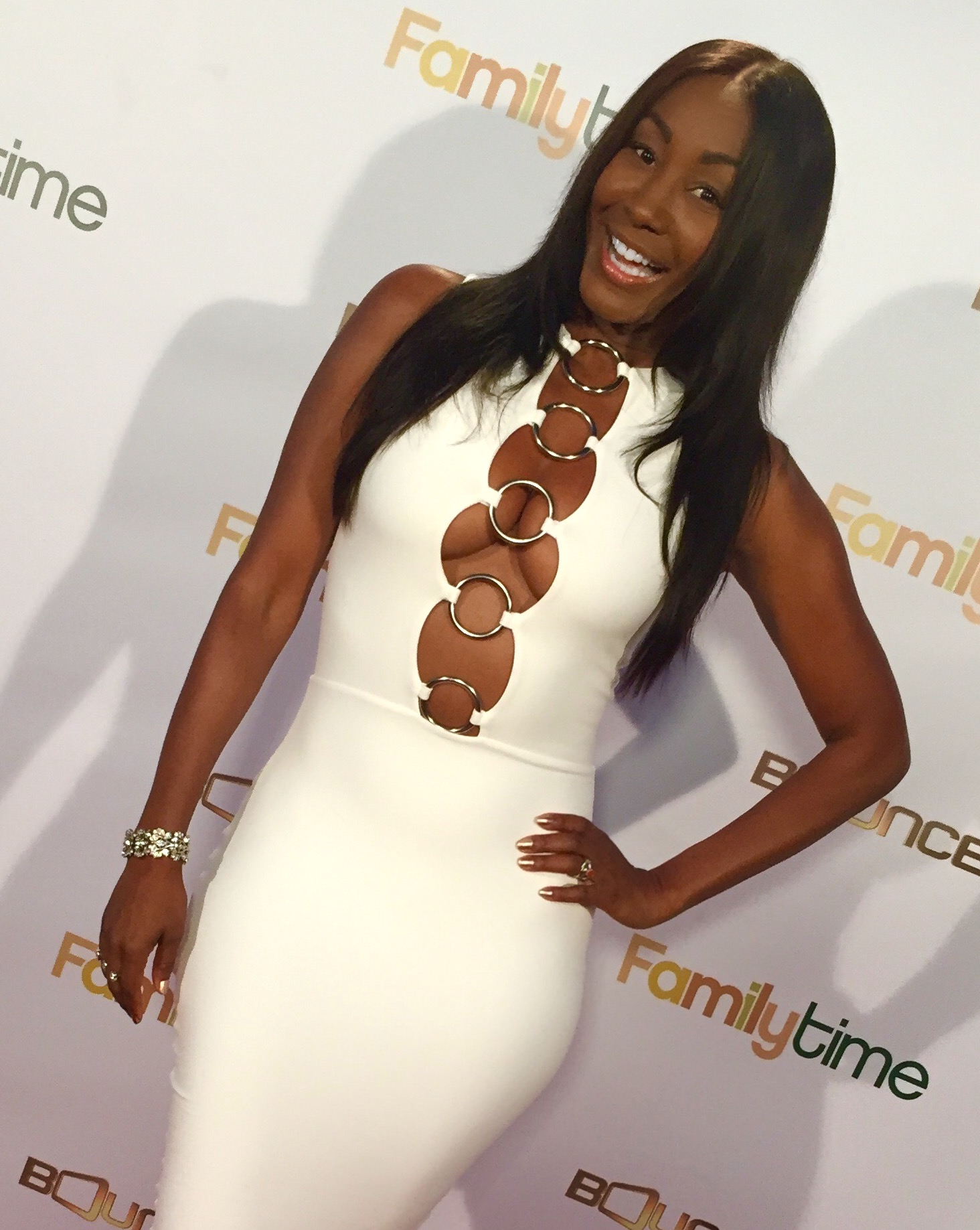
- Tanjareen at the Family Time season 5 wrap party
- Born: Tanjareen Martin
- Occupations: Actress; producer; host; comedian; social media personality
- Years active: 1997–present
- Spouse: Clayton Thomas (m. 2014–present)
- Website: Official website

Tanjareen Thomas is an American actress, producer, comedian, and social media personality.

== Career ==
Her television credits include: Millennials, Famous in Love, Family Time, Curb Your Enthusiasm, Days of Our Lives, Strong Medicine, Howard Stern, The Steve Harvey Show, and City Guys. Thomas is also known for her roles in the films: I Got The Hook Up 2, Johnson Family Vacation as Tangerine, Love For Sale, and Miss March. She has also been in several national commercials, music videos, she's co-hosted weekly radio shows, and hosts weekly live streams.

During the pandemic, Tanjareen created two successful livestream series: Tanjareen's Top Talent (a virtual variety show) and Shoot Your Shott (an interactive dating game show).

== Filmography ==
=== Film ===
Year	Title	Role	Notes
2004	Johnson Family Vacation	Tangerine	
2005	Only In America	Diamond	
2005	N.T.V. Volume 1	Tameka	Video
2005	N.T.V. Volume 2	Tameka	Video
2005	Halloween House Party	CeCe	
2006	Low	Alex	Short
2006	National Lampoon's Cattle Call	Juicy Ventura	
2006	KwameWorld	Bobbi Tweed	Short
2007	Frangela	Marika	TV movie
2008	The Club	-	Short
2008	Da Network	Syreeta O'Neil	TV movie
2008	Love For Sale	Dedra	
2009	Miss March	Crystal	
2009	Hurricane In The Rose Garden	Annabel	Video
2010	Something Like a Business	Taquan's Woman	
2012	Sistaah Friend	-	Short
2013	Baby Girl	Angie	Short
2015	Hype Man	Woman	Short
2015	She Wins	Dominique	
2015	Zodiac Sign	Tasha	
2016	Mouthpiece	Sheila	
2017	BorderClash 4: Cognitive Dissonance	Ororo 'Storm' Munroe	Short
2019	I Got The Hook Up 2	Bre	
2019	Don't Say Yes	Denise	Short
2023	The Get Back	-	
2025	Onyx	Diane	Lead
2026	Hands	Mindy	Lead

=== Television ===
Year	Title	Role	Notes
1997	The Jenny McCarthy Show	Clerk/Gillian	2 episodes
1999	Becker	Molly	Episode: "Love! Lies! Bleeding!"
2000	Change of Heart	Contestant	Episode: "Change of Heart"
2000	Arliss	Nikki Rawls	Episode: "The Value of Honesty"
2000–2003	The Parkers	Mona/Student	Episode: "Funny, Funny Velentine"; Episode: "Somebody's Watching You"
2000–2001	City Guys	Rachel/Model/Rude Customer	Guest: Season 3, Recurring Cast: Season 4–5
2001	V.I.P.	Rand	Episode: "A.I. Highrise"
2001	NYPD Blue	Chelsea	Episode: "Lost Time"
2001	The Steve Harvey Show	Laverne	Episode: "Do Not Duplicate"
2001	Off Centre	Girl #3	Episode: "Trust Me or Don't Trust Me"
2001–2002	Strong Medicine	Carmel	Guest Cast: Season 2–3
2002	For Your Love	Party Girl	Episode: "The Picture Perfect Family"
2003	Wanda at Large	Booty Shaker #1	Episode: "Alma Mater"
2005	All of Us	Woman	2 episodes
2006	Perfect 10: Model Boxing	The Sting Machine	TV series
2007	According to Jim	Assistant	Episode: "The Flannelsexual"
2007	Girlfriends	Karin Durham	Episode: "Wrong Side of the Tracks"
2007	The Sarah Silverman Program	Crack Whore #3	Episode: "Officer Jay"
2007	Without A Trace	Cherokee	Episode: "One and Only"
2007	Days of Our Lives	ADA Jen Chapman	Episode: "Episode #1.10722"
2009	Atom TV	Herself	Episode: "White People Problems"
2009	Curb Your Enthusiasm	Alton's Wife	Episode: "Vehicular Fellatio"
2011	The Celibate Nympho Chronicles: The Web Series	Celibate Nympho	Main Cast
2012	Lyrical Flash Mob	Ka'ron	
2012–2020	Family Time	Rachel	Recurring Cast
2013	How Men Become Dogs	Rachel Carsey	Episode: "Hamlin Let The Dogs Out"
2013	Zane's The Jump Off	Lauren Strickland	Recurring Cast
2013	The Rev	Brenda Starr	Main Cast
2014–2018	The Grand Slams	Egg (voice)	Main Cast
2015	Sex Sent Me to the ER	Tosha/Amber	2 episodes
2015	Conan	Cyber Monday Looter #1	Episode: "Tom Jones/Oliver Hudson"
2015	Tosh.0	Club Girl	Episode: "Fart Porn"
2017	A Girl Is a Gun	Lips	Episode: "Save the Last Dance for Me"
2017	Famous in Love	Brandy	Recurring Cast: Season 1
2017–2018	Here's the Thing	Amy	Recurring Cast
2018	Liza on Demand	Mistress AKA Shannon	Episode: "Valentine's Day"
2018	Funny Married Stuff	Brooke	Episode: "Catch The Big D"
2018	Insecure	Isys	Episode: "High Life"
2018	Unmasked: Sidewalk Superheroes	Pam	Recurring Cast
2021–2022	Millennials	Carmen Dandridge	Recurring Cast
2022	Phat Tuesdays	Herself	Recurring Guest
2023	The Michael Blackson Show	Latrisha Jackson	Recurring Cast
2026	Lot Patrol	Sharlett	Series Regular

== Commercials ==
- 2001 - Subway Sandwiches
- 2003 - Pop Secret Popcorn
- 2003 - Reebok D'Funkd Clothing (print ad)
- 2004 - McDonald's Salads
- 2005 - Southwest Airlines
- 2006 - Michelob Beer
- 2008 - Body By Jake Shadow Boxer
- 2008 - Pizza Hut Tuscani Pasta
- 2012 - Dherbs Full Body Detox
- 2014–2017 - Denny's Grand Slams campaign (VoiceOver)
- 2021 - Hulu

== Podcast Hosting ==
- 2008–2009: co-host of "Speedy's Comedy Corner" on The Foxxhole
- 2008–2010: co-host of "Chopping It Up Live" on 93.5fm KDAY (Los Angeles) and on DherbsRadio.com
- 2011–2012: co-host of "Black Hollywood Weekly with The Sistars" for AfterBuzz TV
- 2015: host of "Musical Boot Camp" on "HumorMillMag.com"
- 2020–2025: co-host and producer of "Marriage Go Round"

== Personal life ==
Tanjareen is from Inglewood, California.

Tanjareen met Clayton Thomas while being a guest on Speedy’s Comedy Corner in February 2008

Tanjareen married comedian/ writer Clayton Thomas on May 14, 2014
