= Welcome to Rap City =

2023 television documentary series

- Genre: Documentary
- Directed by: Rahman Ali Bugg
- Country of origin: United States
- Original language: English
- No. of series: 1
- No. of episodes: 3

Production
- Executive producers: Connie Orlando; Jamal Noisette; Sam Walker II; Peter Bittenbender; Jenya Meggs; Camara Rose
- Producer: Laquin Alexander
- Editor: Kristian R. Hill
- Production company: Mass Apeal

Original release
- Network: BET
- Release: October 10 – October 12, 2023

Welcome to Rap City is an American three-part television documentary series about the music video television program block Rap City. The series premiered on October 10, 2023, on BET.

== Cast ==
- Selwyn Seyfu Hinds
- Deb Antney
- Shanti Das
- John D. Tucker
- Kimberly Osorio
- Stephen G. Hill
- Lee Harris
- Debra L. Lee
- Alvin Jones
- Charlamagne tha God
- Keith Paschall
- Hans "Prime" Dobson
- Chris "The Mayor" Thomas
- Matthew Smith
- Da Brat
- Mike B.
- Melanie Massie
- Leslie Segar
- Ludacris
- Chaka Zulu
- Sam Walker II
- Prince DaJour
- Kevin Liles
- T.I.
- Trina
- Eve
- Aiyisha T. Obafemi
- Gregg Diggs
- Jim Jones
- Joe Clair
- Tuma Basa
- Big Tigger
- Penny McDonald
- Gabrielle Peluso
- J-Nicks

== Episodes ==
No.	Title	Original release date	U.S. viewers (millions)
1	"Building a City"	October 10, 2023	N/A
2	"The Notorious Bassment"	October 11, 2023	N/A
3	"A Changing City"	October 12, 2023	N/A
