= Rap City =

- The outro frame, 2007
- Also known as: Rap City: Tha Basement (1999–2005)
- Created by: Alvin Jones; Keith Paschell; Stephen G. Hill; Craig Henry; John Dr. Teeth Tucker
- Starring: Chris Thomas (1989–1991); Hans Dobson (1989–1993); Prince DaJour (1991–1994); Joe Clair (1994–1999); Leslie Segar (1994–1999); Big Tigger (1998–2005); DJ Mad Linx (2005–2006); J-Nicks (2005–2006); Q-45 (2006–2008)
- Country of origin: United States

Production
- Producers: Matt Smith (2000–2008); Theron "Tee Smif" Smith (2007-2008); Gregory Trent (2001–2005); Craig Henry (1997–1999); Obi Holly (1997–2000); John "Dr. Teeth" Tucker (1998–2001)
- Running time: 120 minutes (1989–2005); 60 minutes (2005–2008)

Original release
- Network: BET
- Release: August 11, 1989 – November 8, 2008

Rap City, also known as Rap City: Tha Basement from 1999 to 2005, is a music video television program block that originally aired on the Black Entertainment Television (BET) network from August 11, 1989, to November 8, 2008. The program was an exclusive showcase for hip hop music videos, and features interviews with and freestyles from popular rappers, and often has guest DJs serve as co-hosts.

== History ==
=== Conception ===
The show was created by former BET VJ/producer Alvin Jones, a.k.a. "The Unseen VJ". This was a spin-off of the "Rap Week" segment of Video Vibrations, also hosted by "The Unseen VJ". While its competitor Yo! MTV Raps, which is now discontinued, mainly focused on popular rappers, Rap City also included videos from up-and-coming underground rappers.

In 1999, Stephen G. Hill, then-president of Music Programming, took Rap City from its original format, a traveling show that went into the cities of the hottest rappers in the country, to an in studio format. Retitled Rap City: Tha Basement after meeting [at a DJ/Music Convention] DJ & radio personalities The Bassment Brothers: Trouble T & Phil the Thrill, who were doing a show called Friday Night in the Bassment on WKKV fm radio in Milwaukee, WI during this time. Big Tigger, the host chosen for the show, even resembled one of the brothers: Trouble T. So much so that his grandmother reached out to him to congratulate him about the show after mistaking Tigger for her grandson! Hill, Senior Producer Craig Henry and Producer John Tucker were credited with creating the studio format. Henry created a 360° basement set that gave the illusion of a real basement, and Tucker was noted for creating the iconic performance in the bathroom that became "The Booth".

=== Hosts and timeslots ===
Among notable previous hosts of the show are Chris Thomas (the first host of the show from 1989–1991). Throughout his run, Thomas was also known as "The Mayor of Rap City", or simply "The Mayor". Other hosts included Hans Dobson aka Prime (1989–1993) (died 2024), Prince DaJour (1991–1994), Joe Clair (1994–1999), Leslie Segar (a.k.a. Big Lez) (1994–1999), Big Tigger (1998–2005), DJ Mad Linx (2005–2006), J-Nicks (2005–2006) and Q-45 (2006–2008).

On September 13, 1999, Stephen G. Hill, BET's President of Music Programming, Senior Producer Craig Henry and Producer John Tucker a new show to fit a studio format; Rap City was re-titled Rap City: Tha Basement and newly hosted by Big Tigger (a.k.a. Tigger), who succeeded Joe Clair and Big Lez. On August 28, 2000, BET moved the show to 4 p.m. On January 18, 2005, the show was repackaged and Big Tigger was replaced as host by Mad Linx, a DJ and radio personality. He was replaced in order to host BET Style, and later 106 & Park. The transition was explained that Tigger's "mother" sold the basement and forced him out to live with his father. On October 3, 2005, Mad Linx went on hiatus to host BET Road Show; for the following several months, the show was hosted by J-Nicks, a native of St. Louis. Occasionally, special guests (such as a hip hop star) would host Rap City. The show's runtime was also shortened from two to one hour.

On December 28, 2005, BET returned the show to its original 5 p.m. time slot. Mad Linx returned to his weekday routine on February 2, 2006. J-Nicks left to work as a weekday radio DJ for WHTA Hot 107.9 FM in Atlanta. On August 14, 2006, Q45 replaced Mad Linx on the show. On September 25, 2006, the time slot for Rap City changed to 4 p.m., and then flipped back to 5 p.m. in October 2006. From that moment on, Q45 hosted the show on Weekdays. Mad Linx hosted Rap City Top 10 on Saturdays and Big Tigger hosted the show as Rap City Presents... specials.

On September 17, 2007, BET changed the time slot of Rap City to 1 a.m. ET, a time slot previously held by syndicated programming. In October 2007, due to series-low ratings, Rap City returned to its previous time slot at 5 p.m. In September 2008, Rap City obtained a new time of 3 p.m.

=== The Freestyle Booth ===
One of the most prominent and most popular segments of the show has been the freestyle booth. The booth was a segment that was added when Rap City becomes a studio format renamed Rap City Tha Basement. Producer John Tucker is credited with creating the now iconic segment The Booth located in the basement bathroom, where the elements gave a grassroots, raw feel to the show. In these particular segments, the guests would lay exclusive new (or often recycled) vocals on the spot. This came to be around Big Tigger's tenure, which also included a guest DJ every week. Seemingly, this concept was scrapped when "Tha Basement" concept left but it has since returned. This is now seen as a major staple of Rap City, although no hosts other than Joe Clair and Big Tigger have joined in during the freestyle sessions. When Rap City premiered in 2005, the show featured a different studio, which replaced the basement. Instead of the basement bathroom, artists would freestyle in an elevator room, where they would often leave their signatures on the wall.

=== Finale ===
On October 1, 2008, BET officially canceled Rap City. Its last airing was Saturday, November 8, 2008, and was replaced by now-cancelled The Deal on November 10, 2008. On Friday, June 12, 2009, a Rap City: Relapse special was aired on BET hosted by Big Tigger with guest Eminem. On November 6, 2013, Rap City returned with another special called EM360 with guest Eminem to promote his album The Marshall Mathers LP 2. In 2021, a Rap City '21 special was aired with Big Tigger as a host, with Fat Joe as guest.

== Legacy ==
In 2023, a documentary about this series, Welcome to Rap City, premiered on BET for three episodes. It also aired on VH1 and streamed on Paramount+.
