= Lot Patrol =

American mockumentary sitcom

- Genre: Mockumentary sitcom; Workplace comedy; Comedy verite
- Created by: Manny Halley; Ernest L. Dancy
- Written by: Manny Halley; Ernest L. Dancy
- Directed by: Erik White
- Starring: DeRay Davis; Carl Anthony Payne II; Alex Thomas; Tamera "Tee" Kissen; Skeet Carter; Darius McCrary; T.K. Kirkland; Tanjareen Thomas; Nick Nervies; Dawn Raven; Iyana Halley; Gary "G Thang" Johnson
- Country of origin: United States
- Original language: English
- No. of seasons: 1
- No. of episodes: 6

Production
- Producers: Manny Halley; Manny "world" Halley Jr.; Ernest L. Dancy
- Editor: Brian Ging
- Camera setup: Single-camera
- Production company: Manny Halley Productions

Original release
- Network: BET
- Release: June 30, 2026 – present

Lot Patrol is an American television mockumentary sitcom that premiered on BET on June 30, 2026.

== Cast ==
=== Main ===
- DeRay Davis as Touche
- Carl Anthony Payne II as Vasco
- Alex Thomas as Woodman
- Tamera "Tee" Kissen as Bonita
- Skeet Carter as Lesley
- Darius McCrary as Captain Hill
- T.K. Kirkland as Mr. Cox
- Tanjareen Thomas as Sharlett
- Nick Nervies as John
- Rob Gordon as Rodney
- Glenn Keong as Simon
- Gary "G Thang" Johnson as Erik
- Dawn Raven as Brenda
- Iyana Halley as Tiffany

=== Recurring ===
- Sara Ruth Brown as Clueless Assistant
- Christina Rodriguez as Cyndy
- Erik White as Director 1
- Gloria Tsai as Mrs. Washington
- Lionell Dalton as Hank
- Steven Clark as Alex
- Aria Darice as Brooklyn
- Luzma Ortiz as Senora Luisa
- Hana Giraldo as Becky
- Sarah Hall as Tara
- Huntington Daly as Ethan Goldstein
- Audra Kinkead as Whitney
- Alan Aymic as Custodian
- Malachi Barnes as PA/Usher
- Tiffany Black as Imani Employee #1
- Casey Lee Sussman as Imani Employee #2
- Edward Beckford as Driver
- Michael Rubenstone as Drunk Empliyee
- Barry Brisco as Black Lightning
- Lovely Riley as Woodman's Girlfriend
- Rob Johnson as Crew #1
- Keir Thirus as Crew #2
- Donte Mack as Masked Man
- Quavion Jones as Ray
- Bat Aklive as Savage
- Danielle Watkins as Hilda Thornberry
- Mike Ciriaco as Mr. Cox Attorney
- Brian Vangeem as Host
- Jason Griffin as Event Guest #1
- Ashley Robinson as Event Guest #2
- Christina Faulkner as Dancer
- Ricardo "Ricky Dula" Sosa as Truck Driver #1
- Seif Nabulsi as Truck Driver #2

=== Guest ===
- Kyle Massey as himself
- Michael Jai White as himself
- Masika Kalysha as herself
- Jeremih as himself
- Tony Cox as himself
- Kris D. Lofton as himself
- Alesha Renee as herself

== Episodes ==
No.	Title	Written by	Original release date	U.S. viewers (millions)
Part 1
1	"No ID, No Entry"	Ernest L. Dancy	June 30, 2026	N/A
2	"Show Your ID"	Ernest L. Dancy	July 7, 2026	N/A
3	"The Naked Intruder"	Ernest L. Dancy	July 14, 2026	N/A
4	"Chocolate Protocol"	Ernest L. Dancy	July 21, 2026	N/A
5	"VIP List Panic"	Ernest L. Dancy	July 28, 2026	N/A
Part 2
6	"Going Hard or Going Home"	TBA	November 3, 2026	TBD
7	"Method to the Madness"	TBA	November 10, 2026	TBD
