= The Michael Blackson Show =

American television sitcom

- Created by: Mark E. Swinton
- Starring: Michael Blackson; April Parker Jones; Rhyan Hill; Bryce Clyde Jenkins; Notlim Taylor; Noah Taliferro; Victoria N. Alcala; Naomi Lavette; Bianca McMillian; Coach Wes Lee; Betty Mitchell; Terri Abney; Clayton English; Alexis Rhee; Josh Reiter; Tanjareen Thomas; Josh Reiter; Mateo Mpinduzi-Mott; Antonia Humes; Ken Colquitt; Jordan Briscoe; DeAndre Stephens; Roy "King Roy" Williams Jr.; Jabari Marshall; Nikki LaShae
- Composers: Walt Liquor; Larry Jazz
- Country of origin: United States
- Original language: English
- No. of seasons: 1
- No. of episodes: 4

Production
- Executive producers: Michael Blackson; Mark E. Swinton; Tyler Perry
- Producers: Deancé Wyatt; Carmen K. Jones; Will Areu; Angi Bones
- Production company: Tyler Perry Studios

Original release
- Network: BET+
- Release: July 27, 2023

The Michael Blackson Show is an American television sitcom that premiered on BET+ on July 27, 2023.

== Plot ==
An African teacher wearing a dashiki, chasing the American Dream, faces culture shock while dealing with rebellious teenagers and quirky colleagues at his new school.

== Cast and characters ==
- Michael Blackson as Michael Black
  - Greg Wattkis as Michael Black's stunt double
- April Parker Jones as Ms. Randolph
- Rhyan Hill as Devontae
- Bryce Clyde Jenkins as Trayvon
- Notlim Taylor as Rasheida
- Noah Taliferro as Bobby
- Victoria N. Alcala as Juanita
- Naomi Lavette as Ursula
- Bianca McMillian as Aleesha
- Coach Wes Lee as Harold Byrd
- Betty Mitchell as Miss Rakowski
- Clayton English as Irv
- Terri Abney as Ms. Reed
- Alexis Rhee as Fang Wu
- Josh Reiter as Carson
- Tanjareen Thomas as Latrisha Jackson
- Mateo Mpinduzi-Mott as Gene
- Antonia Humes as Lisa
- Ken Colquitt as Principal Watkins
- Jordan Briscoe as Bruno The Bully
- DeAndre Stephens as Nerd #1
- Roy 'King Roy' Williams Jr. as Tyrone The MC
- Jabari Marshall as Rodney
  - Jermaine Holt as Rodney's stunt double
- Nikki LaShae as Deldra

== Episodes ==
No.	Title	Directed by	Written by	Original release date	BET air date	U.S. linear viewers (millions)
1	"The First Day Pt. 1"	Mark E. Swinton	Mark E. Swinton	July 27, 2023	August 6, 2024	N/A
2	"The First Day Pt. 2"	Mark E. Swinton	Mark E. Swinton	July 27, 2023	August 13, 2024	N/A
3	"Introducing Miguel"	Mark E. Swinton	Mark E. Swinton	July 27, 2023	August 20, 2024	N/A
4	"Family Ties"	Mark E. Swinton	Mark E. Swinton	July 27, 2023	August 27, 2024	N/A
