= Her Baby =

American thriller television series

- Genre: Thriller
- Starring: Mia Reese; Destyni Hannah Cooper; Brandon McGee
- Country of origin: United States
- Original language: English
- No. of seasons: 1
- No. of episodes: 4

Production
- Camera setup: Multiple camera
- Production company: aTwist

Original release
- Network: BET
- Release: October 7, 2026 – present

Her Baby is an American thriller micro-series which premiered on BET on October 7, 2026.

== Cast and characters ==
- Mia Reese as Naomi
- Destyni Hannah Cooper as Imani
- Brandon McGee as Cory
- Brasai Butler as Margaret
- Maurice T. Johnson as Doctor
- Andre Ellerby as ER Doctor
- Pandora Broadwater as Psychiatrist
- Anthony Lamar Hailey as Paramedic 1
- Rycal Blount as Paramedic 2

== Episodes ==
No.	Title	Directed by	Written by	Original release date
1	"Her Surrogate"	Courtney Miller	Unknown	October 7, 2026
2	"Her Insulin"	Courtney Miller	TBA	October 14, 2026
3	"Her Husband"	TBA	TBA	October 21, 2026
4	"Her Baby"	TBA	TBA	October 28, 2026
