= Karen DeWitt =

American journalist and communications executive

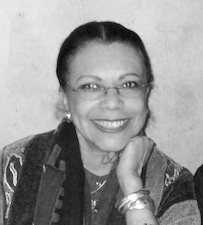
- Born: April 18, 1944 (age 82); Washington, Pennsylvania
- Education: Miami University
- Occupation: Journalist
- Spouse: Jesse Lewis (1969-1974)

Karen DeWitt (born April 18, 1944) is an American journalist and communications executive. She worked for the New York Post, National Journal, The Washington Post, The New York Times, USA Today, and the Washington Examiner, and was a senior producer for ABC’s Nightline. In 2017 she joined the faculty at Morgan State University, the largest HCBU in Maryland, where she serves as Digital Newsroom Director at the School of Global Journalism and Communication.

== Early life ==
DeWitt, born in her mother’s hometown of Washington, Pennsylvania, was brought up by her parents — Geraldine (Streibling) DeWitt and Donald LeFevre DeWitt — in Dayton, Ohio. She has two younger brothers, Donald LeFevre DeWitt, Jr., and Mark Andre DeWitt.

Her father, a native of Kingston, New York, was descended from the community of historic Black families in Ulster County, dating back to the Revolutionary War.

== Education ==
DeWitt graduated in 1962 from Julienne High School in Dayton, where she served as president of her senior class. Drawn to both music and art, as well as writing, she studied violin throughout her school years and also attended the Dayton Art Institute from 1954-1962.

From 1962 to 1966, she attended Miami University in Oxford, Ohio, where she majored in English and philosophy. After her freshman year, she spent the summer working as a paid intern for The Pittsburgh Courier, one of the most widely circulated Black newspapers in the United States. While in Oxford, she wrote for the campus newspaper The Miami Student, and also its magazine supplement.

== Peace Corps ==
DeWitt applied to join the Peace Corps in 1965. Required to spend a summer in preparation, following her Miami junior year she lived in Los Angeles where she was enrolled in the demanding Advanced Peace Corps Trainee program based on the UCLA campus. After graduation from Miami University in April 1966, she was assigned to spend two years in Ethiopia, living and working in the town of Waliso, 114 km southwest of Addis Ababa. There she taught English to students in secondary school.

== Personal life ==
In early 1969, while working for the New York Post, DeWitt met Jesse Lewis, a reporter for The Washington Post. They married six weeks later — and in June 1969, moved to Lebanon, where Lewis, appointed The Washington Post’s Middle East correspondent, was to open the paper’s bureau in Beirut.

== Career ==
While living in Beirut, DeWitt wrote features and news articles for The Daily Star, the largest English-language daily newspaper in the Middle East, from 1969 to 1972.

Having returned to the U.S., she took a staff writer position at The Washington Post's Style section in 1977, before moving on to occupy a national correspondent slot at the Washington bureau of The New York Times at the end of that year.

In 1982, she produced and starred in 26 episodes of Karen's Kitchen, a cooking show for the fledgling network Black Entertainment Television.

DeWitt worked for USA Today from 1982 to 1990, where she was White House correspondent covering Ronald Reagan's second term, before becoming assistant national editor. During five of her eight years at USA Today, she was a foreign correspondent, covering South Africa before the end of apartheid. She also reported firsthand on wars on Honduras and Nicaragua, and covered the fall of President Manuel Noriega in Panama.

DeWitt then moved back to The New York Times Washington bureau, where she reported as a national correspondent until 1997.

From 1997 through 2001, she worked as a senior producer on the ABC News late-night program Nightline.

After four years with ABC News, she launched her own media and communications consultation company, Suo Marte Media Consultancy, in 2001. Among her clients were the Children’s Defense Fund, People for the American Way, and the National Association of Home Builders.

In 2004, DeWitt became the first Washington editor at the Washington Examiner.

In 2005 she was appointed Director of Communications for the Leadership Conference on Civil Rights, and later, Vice-President of Content for the Leadership Conference on Human and Civil Rights after the organization changed its name in 2010.

As Communications Manager for The Sentencing Project — a research and advocacy group dedicated to working for “a fair and effective criminal justice system" — from 2011 to 2014, DeWitt once wrote: “I spent a lifetime writing who, what, where, when, why and how. I know how to tell and sell a story. At this point in my life, I could be selling soap. I’d rather sell justice.”

From 2014 to 2017, she was speechwriter for the president of the American Bar Association.

Since 2012, DeWitt has been a regular contributor to the Baltimore Post-Examiner.

She began teaching at Morgan State University in 2017, and has served as Digital Newsroom Director at their School of Global Journalism and Communication since 2019.

== Awards and fellowships ==
DeWitt received a journalism award in 1979 from the University of the District of Columbia.

During the 1989-90 academic year, she was an R.M. Seaton Fellow at Kansas State University.

In June through September 1995, she was a U.S.-Japan Leadership Program Fellow in Tokyo.

She won a Best Feature award from the National Association of Black Journalists for writing and producing the 1999 Nightline episode "Found Voices: The Slave Narratives."
