= Craft service =

Film industry food service

Craft service, crafts service, or craft services is the department in film, television and video production which provides cast and crew with snacks, drinks, and other assistance.

Craft service workers, nicknamed "crafty", are so called because they provide their services to the other departments, known as crafts, in a set. In the United States and Canada they are represented by a union, the International Alliance of Theatrical Stage Employees (IATSE). Other departments such as camera, sound, electricians, grips, props, art director, set decorator, special effects, hair, and make-up are referred to as crafts. Craft service is also an IATSE stagecraft and the work is covered by a collective bargaining agreement.

The purpose of the craft service union local is to service the other IATSE crafts. Crafts service laborers are one of the few crew jobs that can cross jurisdictional lines to assist other department crew members including set dressers, property persons, camera persons, grips, lighting technicians, costumers, make up artists, and hair stylists. Their work can range from assisting set dressers with transporting decor to an underwater set, maintaining shop equipment for the special effects department, and working as a layout board technician to help protect filming locations. Laborers affiliated with the Laborers' International Union of North America (LiUNA!) Local 724 are the other unionized crew members who can cross jurisdictional lines to assist IATSE carpenters, sheet metal workers, plasterers, and off-production painters. While the laborers would provide cross-jurisdictional service to these trades during the construction of new sets or wrecking of sets, the labor work on stages or sets and locations during the actual shooting of the picture would be provided by crafts service workers.

Craft service is different from catering; craft service refers to the food always available to the crew while they are working, while catering is provided by a catering company or a restaurant and handles full meals.

Typically there is one main table where the snacks and coffee are set up (which is simply called "crafty" or "the crafty table"). Occasionally there are two craft service stations, with one being for cast and crew and another for non-union background actors. A "satellite" crafty may be set up next to the camera, as they may not be able to leave their workstations. In addition to snacks and drinks, the craft service department may perform odd jobs including digging holes for camera placement, laying out protective materials, and keeping the set clean.
