= Born to Dance: Laurieann Gibson =

- Genre: Reality
- Starring: Laurieann Gibson
- Country of origin: United States
- Original language: English
- No. of seasons: 1

Production
- Production location: California

Original release
- Network: BET
- Release: August 2, 2011

Related
- The Dance Scene

Born to Dance is an American reality television series hosted by choreographer Laurieann Gibson. The series premiered premiere on BET on August 2, 2011.

== Overview ==
The series stars Laurieann Gibson and follows 20 aspiring dancers competing for the chance to become Hollywood's next "It" dancer.

== Cast ==
Laurieann Gibson
Richard Jackson
Bethany "Peanut" Strong
Jahleeka “Jelly” Morris
