= Dherbs, Inc. =

American herbal distribution company

- Formerly: Dherbs Health Emporium
- Company type: Private
- Industry: Health products
- Founded: 2004
- Founder: A.D. Dolphin
- Headquarters: Los Angeles, California, United States
- Website: www.dherbs.com

Dherbs, Inc. is an American privately owned herbal distribution company headquartered in Los Angeles, California. It was founded in 2004 by A.D. Dolphin, who is also the company's CEO. Dherbs is best known for its use of "Vegicaps", a herbal supplement tablet that does not use gelatin.

== Products ==
The company's products include organic and herbal supplements for health cleanses. The Dherbs Full Body Cleanse was recognized by Shape as one of the "Top 10 Detox Diets of 2014".

Dherbs was featured on The Steve Harvey Morning Show and The D.L. Hughley Show and has been endorsed by Brandy, Shemar Moore and Elise Neal. In 2016, on The Steve Harvey Show, the company donated ten thousand dollars to a couple who started a camp for adolescent males.
