= Bigger (TV series) =

- Genre: Comedy
- Created by: Felischa Marye
- Written by: Felischa Marye
- Starring: Tanisha Long; Angell Conwell; Rasheda Crockett; Tristen J. Winger; Chase Anthony
- Country of origin: United States
- Original language: English
- No. of seasons: 2
- No. of episodes: 20

Production
- Executive producer: Will Packer
- Running time: 28-33 min.
- Production companies: Will Packer Productions; Running With Scissors, Inc.; Capital Arts Entertainment

Original release
- Network: BET+
- Release: September 19, 2019 – April 22, 2021

Bigger is an American comedy television series executive produced by Will Packer that premiered on September 19, 2019 on BET+. On February 18, 2020, BET+ announced the series was renewed for a second season which premiered on April 22, 2021. In December 2021, the series was canceled after two seasons.

== Premise ==
Bigger follows "five thirty-somethings living in Atlanta as they try to build professional and personal lives they can be proud of, but the one thing they don't have keeps impeding their progress: love. Unresolved feelings from college are uncovered and secrets revealed, forcing these friends to finally deal with uncomfortable truths about each other."

== Cast ==
- Tanisha Long as Layne Roberts
- Angell Conwell as Veronica Yates
- Rasheda Crockett as Tracey Davis
- Tristen J. Winger as Vince
- Chase Anthony as Deon

=== Recurring ===
- Lucius Baston as Terry
- Devale Ellis as Ken

== Episodes ==
Season	Episodes	Originally released	
Season	Episodes	First released	Last released
1	10	September 19, 2019	November 7, 2019
2	10	April 22, 2021	

=== Season 1 (2019) ===
No. overall	No. in season	Title	Directed by	Written by	Original release date	BET air date	U.S. linear viewers (millions)
1	1	"What's Best? (Pilot)"	Charles Stone III	Felischa Marye	September 19, 2019	January 27, 2021	N/A
2	2	"Is Bigger Really Better?"	Charles Stone III	Michelle Listenbee Brown	September 19, 2019	February 3, 2021	N/A
3	3	"Smack My Ass Like You Mean It"	Crystle Roberson	David A. Arnold	September 19, 2019	February 10, 2021	N/A
4	4	"Thot That Counts"	Crystle Roberson	Angela Nissel	September 26, 2019	February 17, 2021	N/A
5	5	"The Greg's"	Chioke Nassor	Carla Banks Waddles	October 3, 2019	February 24, 2021	0.36
6	6	"Baby Steps"	Chioke Nassor	Felischa Marye	October 10, 2019	March 3, 2021	0.41
7	7	"Where Do We Go from Here?"	Angela Barnes Gomes	Courtney Perdue & Baindu Saidu	October 17, 2019	March 10, 2021	0.35
8	8	"Paint 'n Sip"	Angela Barnes Gomes	Lou-Lou Igbokwe	October 24, 2019	March 17, 2021	0.46
9	9	"Mazel Tov"	Charles Stone III	Breannah Gibson	October 31, 2019	March 24, 2021	0.42
10	10	"What Am I Supposed To Do With…"	Charles Stone III	Felischa Marye & Devon K. Shepard	November 7, 2019	March 31, 2021	0.48

=== Season 2 (2021) ===
No. overall	No. in season	Title	Directed by	Written by	Original release date	BET air date	U.S. linear viewers (millions)
11	1	"All Good"	Crystle Roberson	Felichsa Marye	April 22, 2021	January 5, 2022	0.43
12	2	"You Feel Better? I Feel Better"	Crystle Roberson	Breannah Gibson	April 22, 2021	January 12, 2022	0.48
13	3	"N****s in Retrograde"	Henry Chan	Courtney Purdue & Baindu Saidu	April 22, 2021	January 19, 2022	0.49
14	4	"Grown Man Shit"	Henry Chan	Craig Wayans	April 22, 2021	January 26, 2022	0.44
15	5	"Time Don't Give You Time"	Leslie Kolins Small	Howard Jordan, Jr.	April 22, 2021	February 2, 2022	0.56
16	6	"No Hands"	Leslie Kolins Small	Antonio F. March & Jacquline McKinley	April 22, 2021	February 9, 2022	0.34
17	7	"I vs We"	Nefertite Nguvu	Rochée Jeffrey	April 22, 2021	February 16, 2022	0.35
18	8	"Strangers at a Shiva"	Felisha Marye	Devon K. Shepard	April 22, 2021	February 23, 2022	0.29
19	9	"A Different Man"	Nferie Brown	Jen Golum	April 22, 2021	March 2, 2022	0.35
20	10	"The Right and Wrong Time"	Felisha Marye	Felisha Marye	April 22, 2021	March 9, 2022	0.36

== Production ==
On April 11, 2018, it was announced that BET had given a series order to the production for a first season consisting of ten episodes. Will Packer was set to executive produce the series with Sheila Ducksworth and Felischa Marye serving as writers and co-executive producers. Production companies involved in the series include Will Packer Productions and Collins Entertainment. On February 18, 2020, BET+ announced the series was renewed for a second season which premiered on April 22, 2021. On December 13, 2021, the series was canceled after two seasons.
