= Personal Diary =

TV Series

Personal Diary logo from BET

Personal Diary is a half-hour TV series that aired on BET which profiled notable African Americans. This TV series was an attempt to broaden the viewer demographics of BET by offering content not based primarily on music and entertainment performances or videos, but content that highlighted historical moments or significant achievements through a first-person, narrative style.

Two signature characteristics distinguished Personal Diary from other TV interview programs. The first was that the questions posed to the featured guest were never heard during the episode, giving the impression that the guest was relaying a stream of thoughts rather than participating in a typical question-and-answer interview. The second was the extreme close-up technique used in the taping of the episode, where the guest's face was prominently shown in frame throughout the episode.

Guests who appeared on the show included educator Marva Collins, Rosa Parks, Ramsey Lewis, Shirley Chisholm, and Barbara Jordan.
