= BET Experience =

Annual american music festival

- Dates: June (historically)
- Locations: Los Angeles, California
- Years active: 2013–present
- Founders: BET
- Area: Crypto.com Arena
- Organizer: Black Entertainment Television (BET)
- Sponsors: Crypto.com
- Website: bet.com/betexperience

BET Experience, also known as BETX, is an annual event organized by Black Entertainment Television (BET) that combines live music, entertainment, and cultural events. Held in Los Angeles, California, the BET Experience is designed to celebrate African American culture, music, and entertainment. The multi-day event typically occurs around the same time as the BET Awards.

== History ==
The first edition of the BET Experience took place made in 2013 as an accompanying event for the BET Awards. The event is viewed as an extension of the BET Awards aimed at promoting the celebration of African American culture across multiple days and engaging the wider audience through various events and activations.

The first edition of the festival featured three days of concerts, comedies held at the L.A. Live complex in downtown Los Angeles, featuring performances, fan interactions, and brand activations, panels on various topics related to wellness and empowerment of Black Americans, and movie showings. BET estimated the number of attendees in 2013 to be well over 100,000 visitors. The headlining acts at the event included artists like Beyoncé, Snoop Dogg, J. Cole, Miguel, and R. Kelly. The programming at the BET Experience also included various events outside concerts.

The festival also featured special segments of BET's "106 & Park" show, late-night concert performances, and movie showings from various films. In addition to these events, the BET Experience included an award ceremony, which marked the culmination of the festival program and was its most significant event.

== Events and activities ==
The BET Experience offers a wide range of events and activities, catering to diverse interests and age groups. Some of the notable features of the BET Experience include:

- Concerts: A highlight of the BET Experience is the Staples Center concerts, where artists from the hip-hop, R&B, and gospel music scenes perform. These concerts feature a mix of established and emerging artists.
- BETX Fan Fest: The BETX Fan Fest is a free event held at the Los Angeles Convention Center. It includes a variety of interactive experiences, such as live performances, fashion shows, dance competitions, and brand activations. Fans can also participate in gaming lounges, beauty makeovers, and other activities.

== Venue and location ==
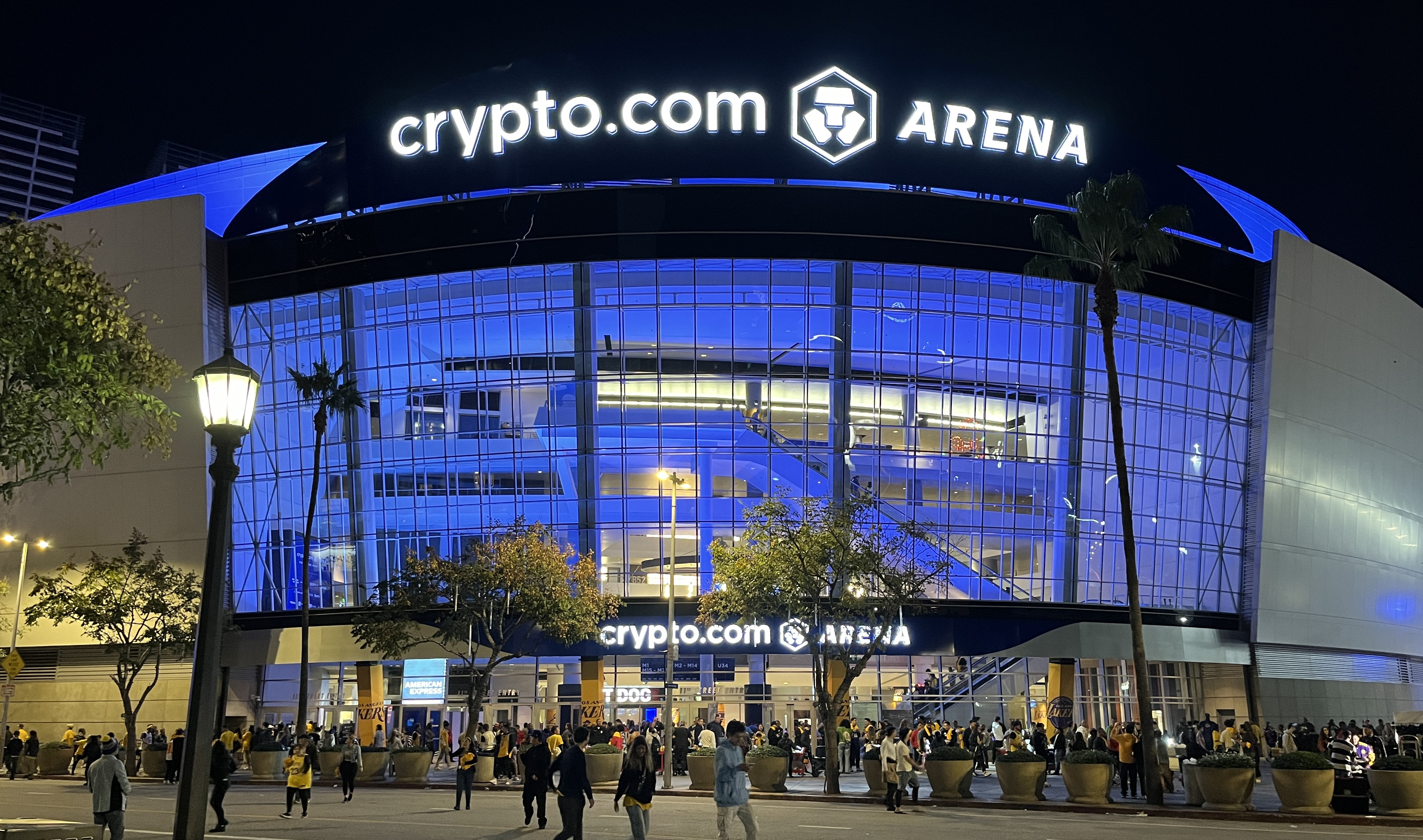

The BET Experience is primarily held at the L.A. Live entertainment complex in Los Angeles, which includes venues like the Staples Center (now known as the Crypto.com Arena), the Microsoft Theater, and the Los Angeles Convention Center. These venues are used to host the various activities of the BET Experience, such as concerts, panel discussions, and fan-focused events.

== Impact and performances ==
=== Notable Performances and Highlights ===
Notable Performances
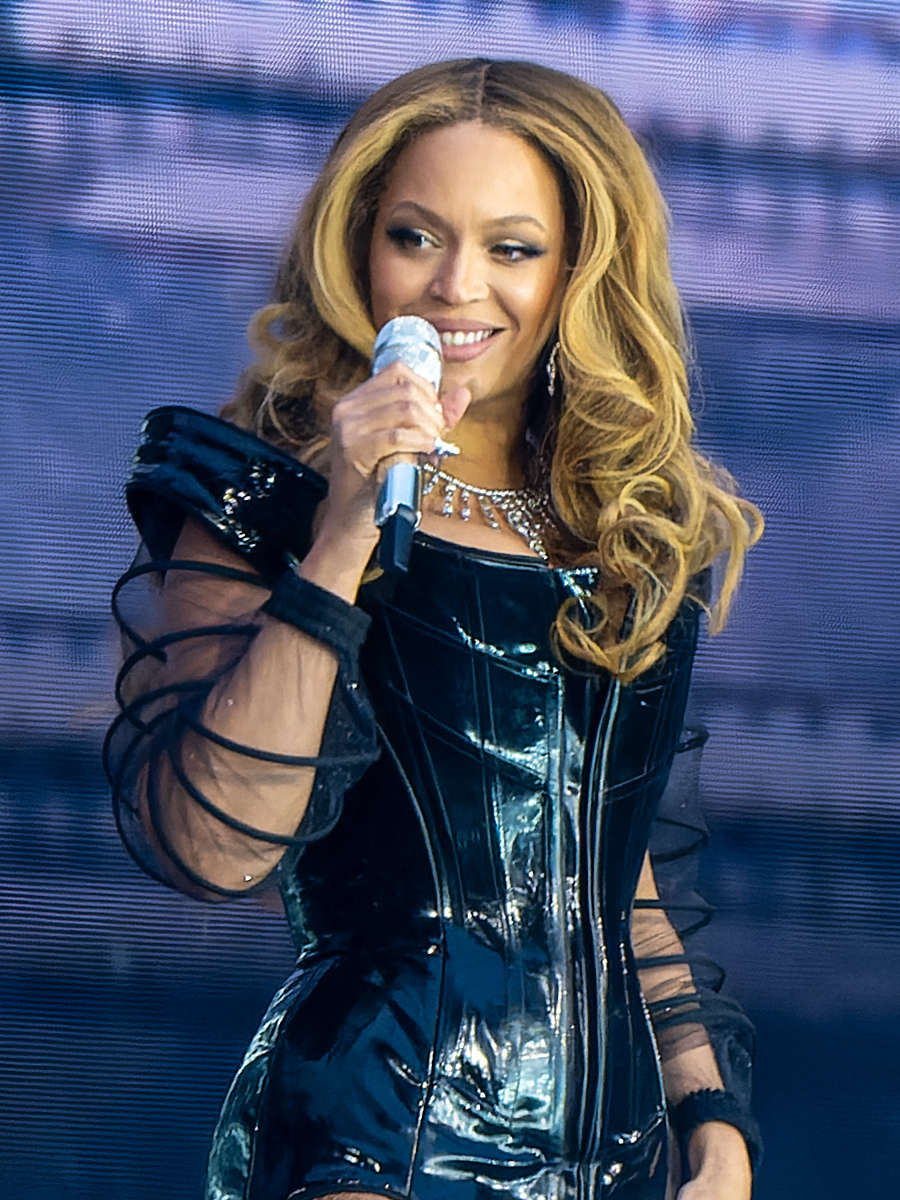

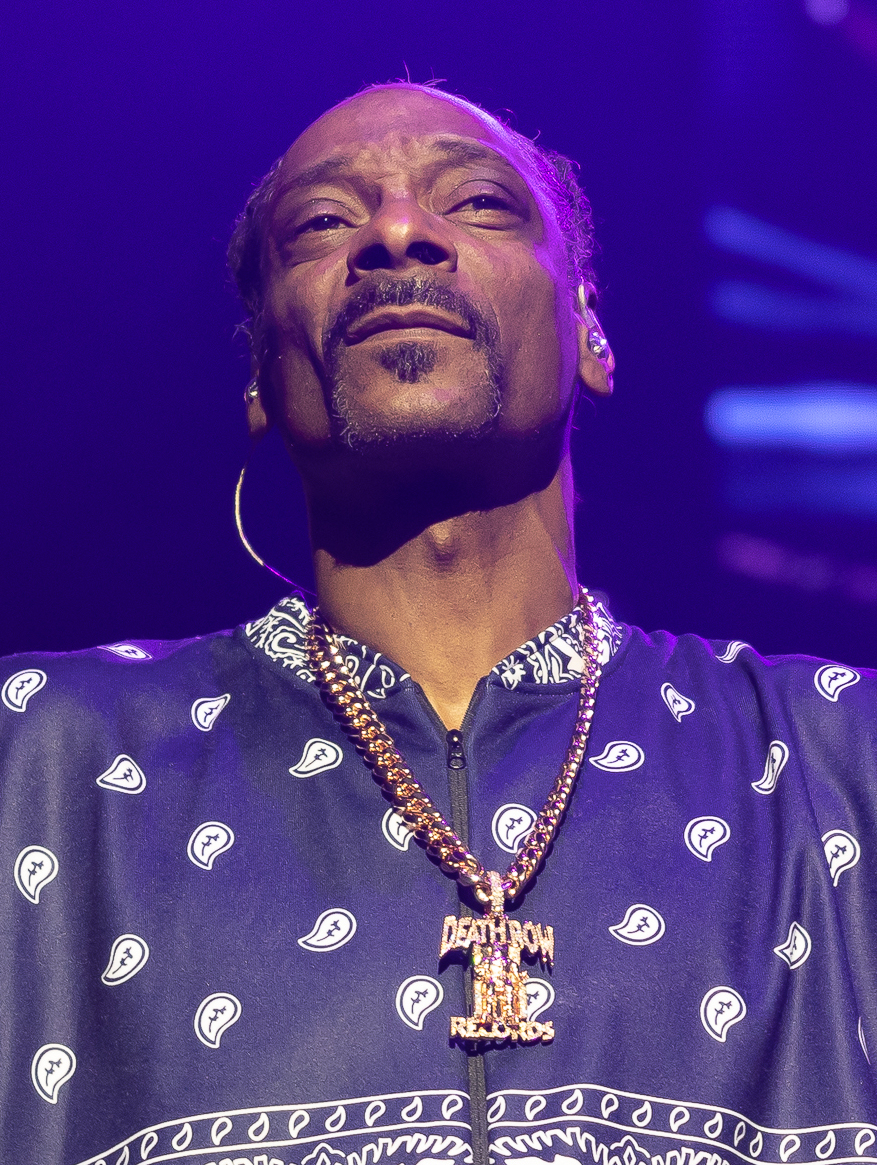

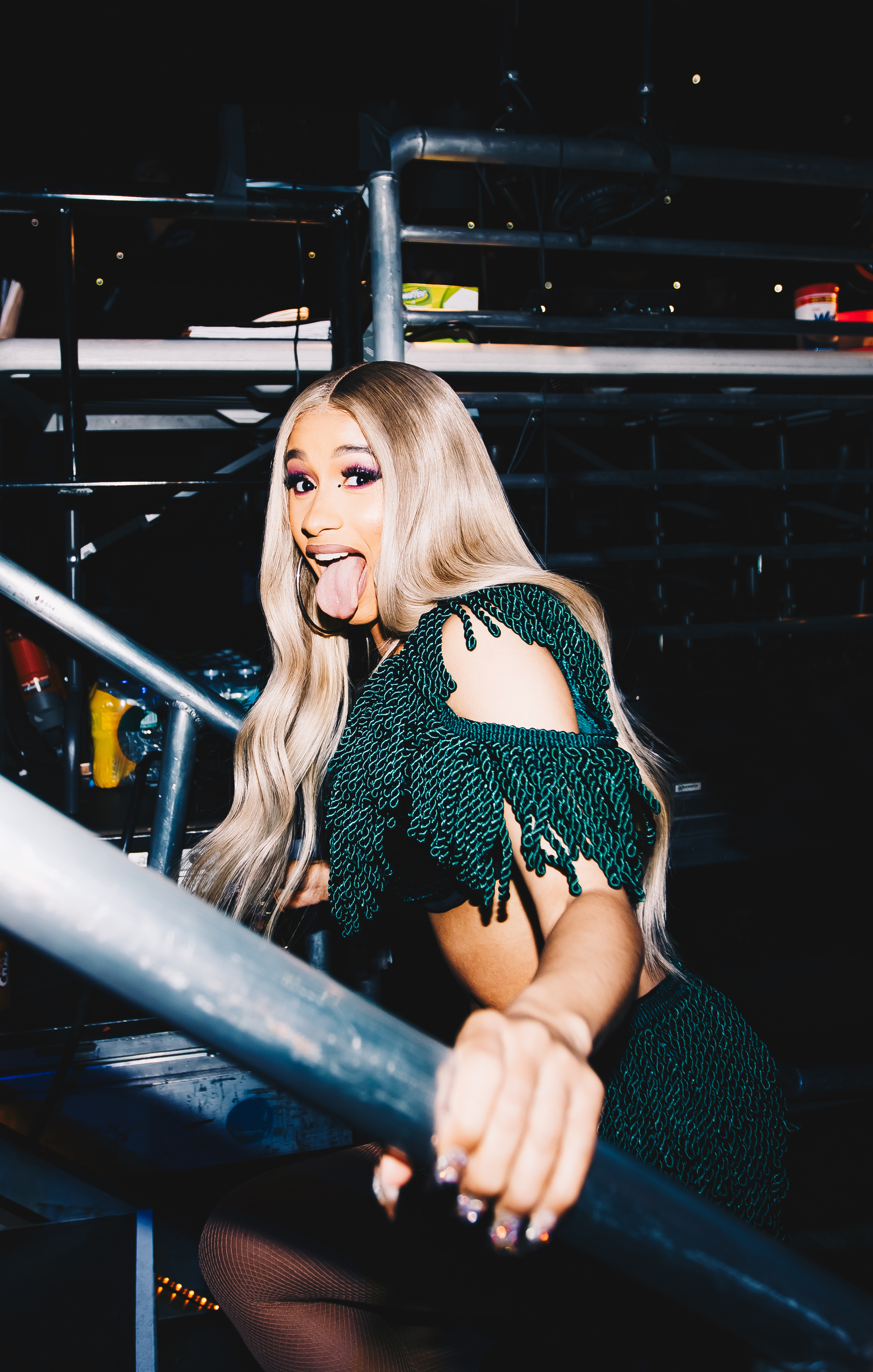

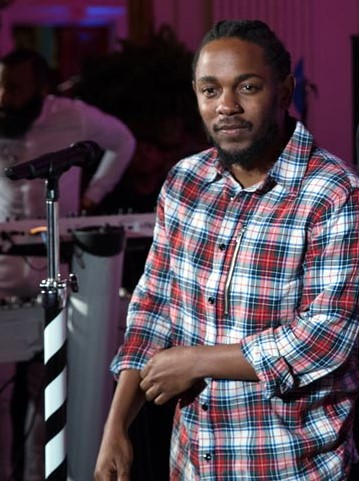

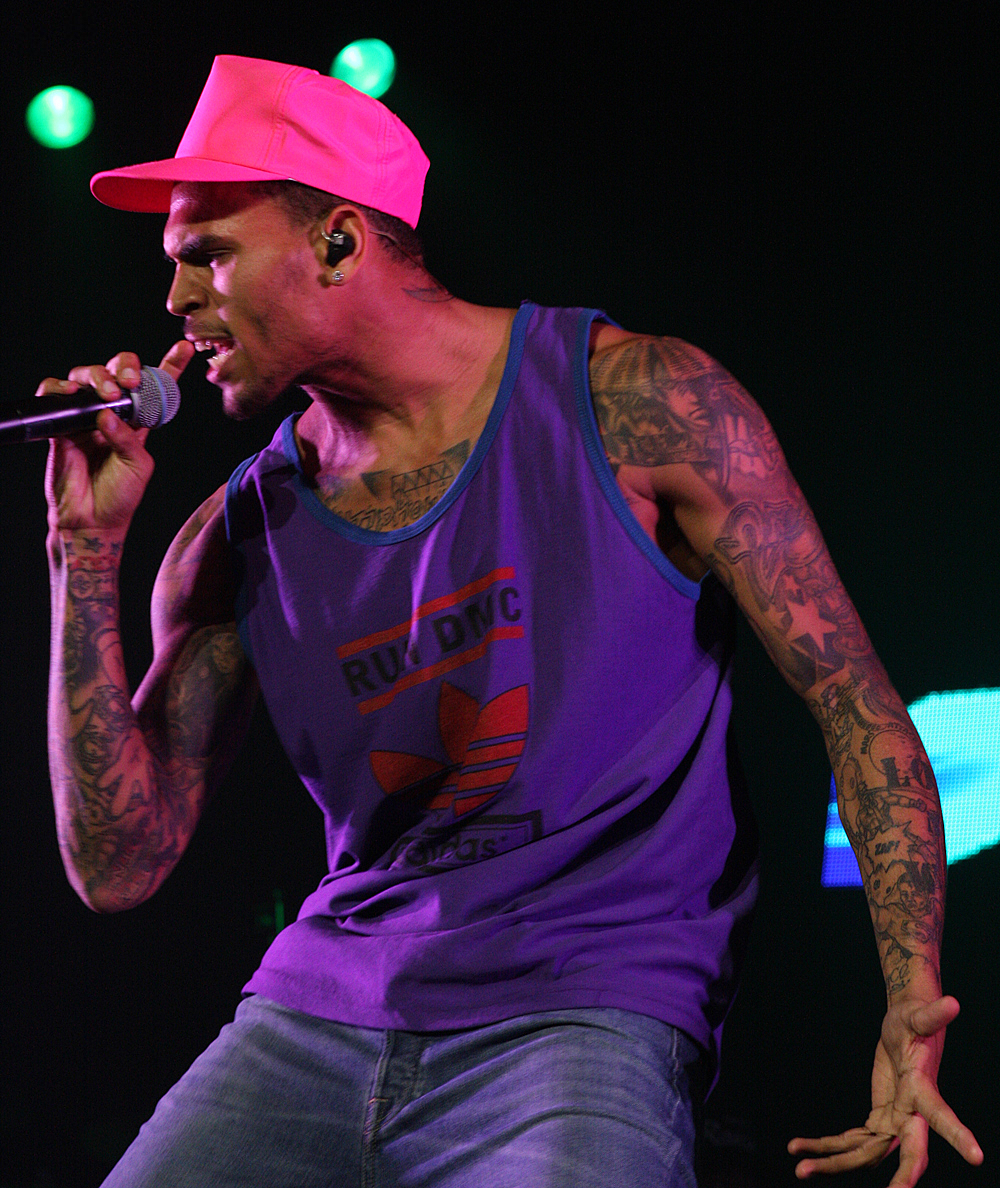

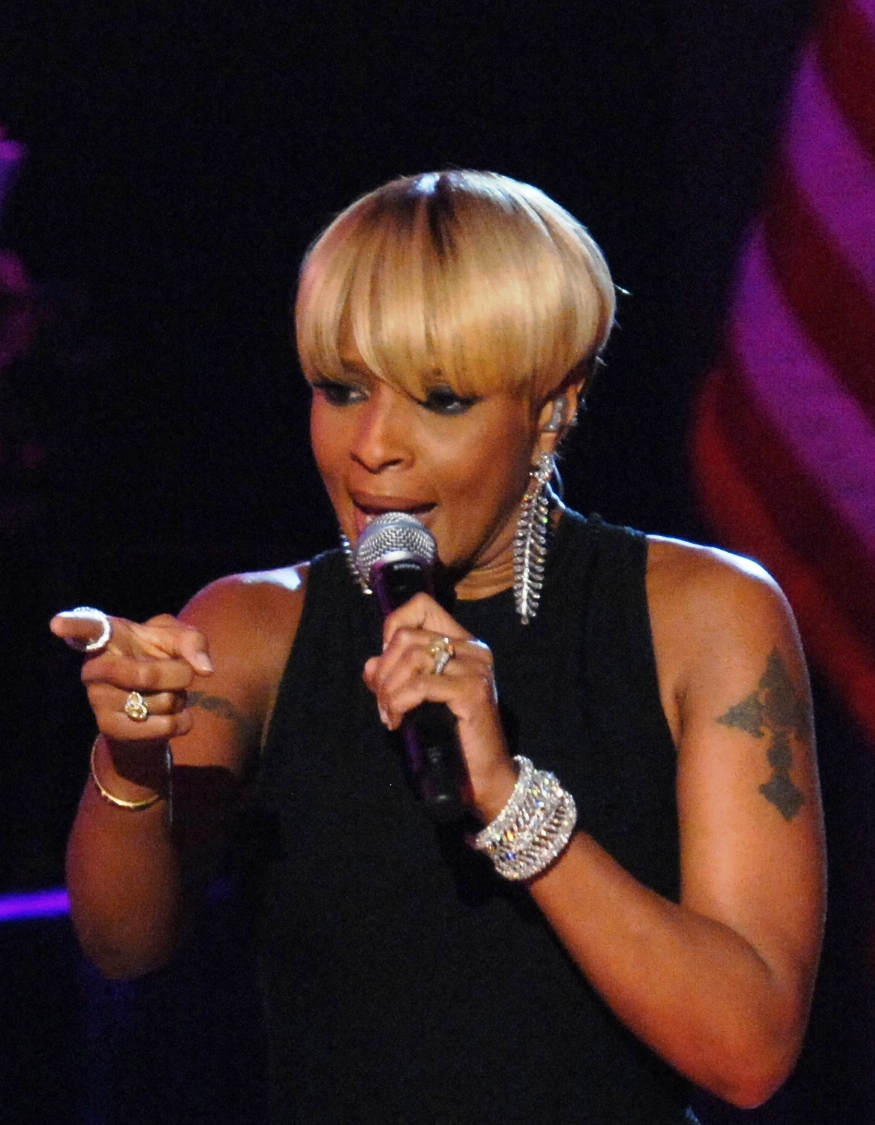

Over time, the BET Experience has featured performances by prominent artists such as Beyoncé, Kendrick Lamar, Snoop Dogg, Mary J. Blige, and Chris Brown. The event’s programming includes a variety of musical genres, ranging from hip-hop and R&B to gospel and soul, offering a diverse lineup aimed at broad audience appeal. In addition to musical performances, the BET Experience includes various events such as red carpet appearances, celebrity basketball games, and pre-awards dinners. These activities offer attendees opportunities to engage with performers and participate in events leading up to the BET Awards.

=== Cancellation and Adaptation ===
In 2020, the BET Experience was held virtually for the first time due to the global COVID-19 pandemic. The shift to an online format included digital content and performances, allowing the event to continue while adhering to public health guidelines. This adaptation also expanded access, enabling a wider international audience to participate.

The 2024 edition of the BET Experience, presented by Walmart, took place from June 26 to 29. The event featured a late-night comedy series with performances by comedians including Chris Spencer, Michael Blackson, and Tiffany Haddish. Musical acts included major artists such as Cardi B and Davido. The festival also included sports, related programming, such as a celebrity basketball game showcasing both athletes and entertainers.
