= BET Nightly News =

BET Nightly News is the main newscast of the BET network. The newscast covered national and international news stories from a black perspective.

The program ran for four years, ending in July 2005. The nightly newscast was replaced by a new format, which included hourly updates and on-line supplements.

Past anchors of the newscast included Michelle Miller and Jacque Reid. The executive producer of the program was Will J. Wright.
