= 106 & Gospel =

- 106 & Gospel's logo
- Starring: Angel Taylor (2009); Jor'el Quinn (2009); Tye Tribbett (2009)
- Country of origin: United States
- No. of episodes: 6

Production
- Running time: 60 minutes

Original release
- Network: BET
- Release: January 11, 2009 – April 2009

106 & Gospel is an inspirational version of the top 10 video countdown show 106 & Park, that aired Sundays on BET. The show premiered on January 11, 2009 and it featured a live audience, gospel music videos, choir battles, and many celebrity guests. The show was canceled in April 2009 due to low ratings on the network.

== Format ==
The program played the top 10 most requested videos of the day, as requested by viewers who could vote by telephone or online. In addition to the music video countdown, a religious show also aired one new music video known as the New Joint of the Day, and a music video from the past known as the Flashback Joint of the Day. Viewers were also able to view videos from singers who talked about how the gospel had an impact in their lives.

== Hosts ==
Angel Taylor from Trin-i-tee 5:7 and Jor'el Quinn from 21:03 were the hosts of the show. The show also featured Tye Tribbett, where his segment "Tye's Tidbits", Tye talked about upcoming events and releases from gospel singers.

== See also ==
- 106 & Park
