= The Murder Inc Story =

2022 television documentary series

- Genre: Documentary
- Directed by: Michael J. Payton
- Country of origin: United States
- Original language: English
- No. of series: 1
- No. of episodes: 5

Production
- Executive producers: Irv Gotti; Ja Rule; Darcell Lawrence; Chris Costine; Tiffany Lea Williams
- Production company: Visionary Ideas

Original release
- Network: BET
- Release: August 9 – September 6, 2022

The Murder Inc Story is an American five-part television documentary series which premiered on August 9, 2022 on BET.

== Episodes ==
No.	Title	Directed by	Original release date	U.S. viewers (millions)
1	"Get the Fortune"	Michael J. Payton	August 9, 2022	0.37
2	"Livin' It Up" "World's Most Dangerous"	Michael J. Payton	August 16, 2022	0.43
3	"Foolish"	Michael J. Payton	August 23, 2022	0.33
4	"So Much Pain"	Michael J. Payton	August 30, 2022	0.33
5	"Pain Is Love"	Michael J. Payton	September 6, 2022	0.28
