= 106 & Sports =

American sports talk show

- Genre: Sports talk show
- Presented by: Cam Newton; Ashley Nicole Moss
- Country of origin: United States
- Original language: English
- No. of series: 1
- No. of episodes: 8 (list of episodes)

Production
- Executive producers: LeBron James; Maverick Carter; Jamal Henderson; Philip Byron; Courtney Whitaker; Tiffany Lea Williams
- Production company: SpringHill Studios

Original release
- Network: BET
- Release: October 15 – December 3, 2025

Related
- 106 & Park

106 & Sports is an American sports talk show and spinoff of 106 & Park hosted by Cam Newton & Ashley Nicole Moss. The series premiered on October 15, 2025, on BET.

After only 8 episodes, BET announced that they would not continue with the show.

== Episodes ==
No.	Title	Original release date	U.S. viewers (millions)
1	"The New Era Begins!" "Cam and Ashley Week #1"	October 15, 2025	N/A
Episode 1 Summary: Top 5 Countdown: #5: Angel Reese is Now a Victoria's Secret Angel; #4: Bad Bunny Makes History as Super Bowl Headliner; #3: Shedeur Sanders Named Browns' 2nd String QB; #2: Chiefs and Lions Clash in Postgame Brawl; #1: Las Vegas Aces Win Third WNBA Championship; Special Guests: Terrence J; Gelo Ball; Claressa Shields; Cam Newton's family; Games: Start, Bench or Trade; Hard Hitting Questions
2	"Tip-Off Takeover" "Cam and Ashley Week #2"	October 22, 2025	N/A
Episode 2 Summary: Top 5 Countdown: #5: The NBA Season Has Officially Begun; #4: Faith and Football - NFL Baptisms; #3: Snitch Line Created for NIL Violation; #2: "Automated Officiating" for Better Calls in the NBA; #1: The Dodgers Return to the World Series; Special Guests: Ellie the Elephant; Ty Young; Ryan Howard; Games: Drip or Slip: Mascot Edition; Start, Bench or Trade
3	"Parking Lot Legends" "Cam and Ashley Week #3"	October 29, 2025	N/A
Episode 3 Summary: Top 5 Countdown: #5: The Future is Now: NBA Rookies; #4: Cam Newton Breaks the Internet; #3: The Cost of Fandom; #2: Russell Wilson vs Sean Payton; #1: Chauncey Billups/Terry Rozier; Cam's Drip Check: Jarred Vanderbilt, Shai Gilgeous-Alexander, Tyrese Haliburton; Special Guests: Flau'jae Johnson; Bruiser the Bulldog (Alabama A&M Mascot); Chad "Ochocinco" Johnson; Game: Crystal Baller
4	"Love & Basketball...& Football & Baseball. & Boxing...&" "Cam and Ashley Week #4"	November 5, 2025	N/A
Episode 4 Summary: Top 5 Countdown: #5: Ja Morant Suspended; #4: NFL Trade Deadline; #3: Should Athletes Play Through Pain?; #2: WNBA Lockout; #1: Legendary Players Become Coaches at HBCUs; Special Guest: Brittney Griner; Games: Crystal Baller; Ballin' on a Budget
5	"Wild Out Wednesday" "Cam and Ashley Week #5"	November 12, 2025	N/A
Episode 5 Summary: Top 5 Countdown: #5: The Hairline Heard 'Round the World; #4: Kevin Durant Trolls Ja Morant's Father; #3: The Mental Toll of Sports; #2: Grammy Nominations Announced; #1: Claressa Shields' Knockout Deal; Special Guest: Bianca Belair; Game: Start, Bench or Trade
6	"Need for Speed" "Cam and Ashley Week #6"	November 19, 2025	N/A
Episode 6 Summary: Top 5 Countdown: #5: Love and Basketball: Klay Defends Megan; #4: Sebastian Telfair from Riches to Rags; #3: Trooper Clashes with South Carolina Players at Texas A&M; #2: Nico Harrison Fired from the Mavericks; #1: Steph Curry is Parting Ways with Under Armour; Special Guests: Taylor Townsend; DeMarcus Cousins; Game: Start, Bench or Trade
7	"It's Giving" "Cam and Ashley Week #7"	November 26, 2025	N/A
Episode 7 Summary: Top 5 Countdown: #5: HBCU Football Deserves More Airtime; #4: Are Pelicans and Grizzles Moving to New Cities?; #3: Project B Reimagines Women's Basketball; #2: Hardwood Heirs: Born to the Game; #1: Is U.S. Basketball Losing Its Home Court Advantage?; Special Guests: Gary Payton Sr.; Tim Hardaway Sr.; Game: Dinner Draft
8	"Heavy Hitters" "Cam and Ashley Week #8"	December 3, 2025	N/A
Episode 8 Summary: Top 5 Countdown: #5: The New Draft Choice: Nil Riches or Pro Ambition; #4: Holiday Showdown: NBA vs. NFL?; #3: Celebs Shaping the Next Wave of Star Athletes; #2: Celeb Side Quests: Method Man's NFL Debut; #1: Year of the Level Up; Special Guests: Todd Gurley; Lamont Roach Jr.; Game: HBCU Meme Madness
