= Leslie Segar =

American dancer

- Born: Jackson Heights, Queens
- Other name: Big Lez
- Education: Springfield College
- Occupations: Dancer, choreographer, actress, producer, radio host
- Website: www.lesliesegar.com

Leslie Segar also known as "Big Lez", is a dancer, choreographer, actress, radio and television personality, and fitness specialist. She is known as a host of Rap City and as the dancer in the opening credits of Living Single.

== Early life and education ==
Segar is from Jackson Heights, Queens. As a young teen she was a gymnast. She has a bachelor's degree in physiology and sport medicine from Springfield College in Springfield, Massachusetts.

== Career ==
Segar has worked as a dancer, choreographer, on-air radio and television personality, producer, fitness specialist, and actress, and is noted for her athletic style and ability to backflip. Her first audition was for the production of Club XXII, a Hip Hop twist of Shakespeare's Twelfth Night produced by Randy Weiner and Rob Hanning and starring Lauryn Hill, MC Lyte, and Wyclef Jean. She has danced with LL Cool J, Bobby Brown, Salt n' Pepa, Mary J. Blige, Whitney Houston, Michael Jackson, and Michael K. Williams, and was a dancer in the opening credits of Living Single. She is most known for her time on Rap City from 1994 to 1999. Segar has choreographed for Sean Combs on Mary J. Blige's first album.

In 2019, she co-hosted a weekly internet radio show Tha Spin Room.

In 2026, Leslie Segar appeared as Denise Harris in Paper Made, directed by Ryan Watson and filmed in Tampa, Florida. The film premiered at the AMC Westshore 14 in Tampa on August 28th, 2026.

== Personal life ==
As of 2020, Segar was living in Los Angeles.

== Filmography ==
=== Film ===
Year	Title	Role	Notes
1991	House Party 2	Dancer	
1992	Malcolm X	Dancer	
1993	Who's the Man?	Sheneequa	
1995	New Jersey Drive	Angry Resident	
1997	Hav Plenty	Jane	
1997	An Alan Smithee Film: Burn Hollywood Burn	Herself	
1999	The Breaks	Janealle	
2001	3 A.M.	Newsstand Woman	
2005	The Fabric of a Man	Gayle	Video
2008	142 John Street	Latrice Warren	Short
2022	A Miracle Before Christmas	Valerie Jenkins	
2024	Trope	Tracey	
2026	Paper Made	Denise Harris	
