= Shorty da Prince =

American rapper

- Born: Jordan C. Johnson; September 11, 1989 (age 36)
- Origin: St. Louis, Missouri, United States
- Genres: Rap, Hip hop
- Occupations: Singer, songwriter, rapper, actor, producer, television personality, radio personality
- Years active: 2007–present
- Labels: Atlantic, Platinum Power Moves
- Website: www.shortydaprince.com

Jordan Johnson (born September 11, 1989), better known by his stage name Shorty da Prince, is an American radio DJ, a rapper, and a television personality. He was one-fourth of the new set of hosts of BET's 106 & Park from October 1, 2012, through May 2013 He is from St. Louis, Missouri, but later relocated to Detroit, Michigan, where he works as a radio host for radio station Hot 107.5.

== Career ==
Shorty started his career in radio when he was just twelve years old after winning a radio host search at KATZ 100.3 The Beat. He hosted a Saturday morning show and begin to become popular radio DJ in the city, eventually becoming the prime time DJ in St Louis, landing the 6 pm-to-midnight slot Monday through Friday, all while still in high school. After honing his craft, Shorty became one of St. Louis' top rated on-air personalities on WHHL HOT 104.1. In 2010, he set his sights on Detroit and landed a gig hosting a top-rated night show on the most popular hip hop station in the city, HOT 107.5. As of 2015 Shorty can be heard on 93.9 WKYS in the DMV (DC/MD/VA).

Shorty soon realized his talents could not be contained behind a microphone and decided to step in front of the camera. He pursued opportunities in television, quickly landing the opportunity to act as a correspondent for BET's 106 and Park and eventually securing the host slot.

Throughout his career in radio, Shorty also chased his love of music. At the age of fifteen, Shorty signed a deal with Track Boyz Entertainment (Nelly Air Force Ones) under the stage name Shorty da Kid. The Track Boyz introduced Shorty da Kid on a tour of artist showcases attended by Universal, Def Jam, Capital and Atlantic Records executives. During the Atlantic records showcase, Shorty caught the eye of media executive Kevin Liles and was immediately signed to Atlantic Records.

Shorty is most known for his 2008 summer anthem "Wah Wah Wow". Despite being released from Atlantic/Warner Bros Records in 2010 Shorty continues to crank out music for his fans. Upon his release, Shorty da Kid changed his stage name to Shorty da Prince.

Beginning May 5, 2014, Shorty will become the afternoon drive DJ on Cleveland radio station WENZ 107.9 FM.
