= 106 & Park =

American hip-hop and R&B music video show

- Created by: Stephen G. Hill
- Presented by: A. J. Calloway and Free (2000–05); Big Tigger and Julissa (2005–06); Terrence J and Rocsi (2006–12); Bow Wow (2012–14); Miss Mykie (2012–13); Paigion (2012–14); Shorty da Prince (2012–13); Angela Simmons (2013); Keshia Chanté (2013–14); Cam Newton; Ashley Nicole Moss; Official DJ: DJ Enuff; DJ Prostyle; DJ Lyve; DJ Megatron; DJ Q45; DJ Jus
- Country of origin: United States
- No. of episodes: 4,711

Production
- Production locations: CBS Broadcast Center, Midtown Manhattan, New York City.
- Running time: 60/90/120 minutes

Original release
- Network: BET (2000–2014); BET+ (2026–present)
- Release: September 11, 2000 – December 19, 2014
- Release: October 15, 2025 – present

106 & Park is an American hip-hop and R&B music video show, set up in a countdown format, that was broadcast on weekdays at 6:00 pm ET/5:00 pm CT on BET; it aired on a one-day delay on BET International. It was the network's highest-rated show throughout its run. On November 14, 2014, BET cancelled 106 & Park, with an alleged shift to a digital-only format, with occasional specials during network event programming, though the last time it was seen in any form was the 2016 BET Experience, and the digital-only program never aired.

Several outlets have reported that, in light of the show's 25th anniversary, a reboot will premiere by September 2025.

== Location ==
The show was originally produced in East Harlem, New York City, and the title of the show is derived from the original studio location, NEP's Metropolis Studios, at East 106th Street and Park Avenue. In 2001, Viacom's acquisition of BET prompted a change to the CBS Broadcast Center at 524 West 57th Street between 10th & 11th Avenues, in the Hell's Kitchen section of Midtown Manhattan, turning its title into a misnomer for the rest of its history.

== Hosts ==
=== A. J. & Free (2000–2005) ===
A. J. Calloway and Marie "Free" Wright were the first hosts of the show from September 11, 2000 until July 28, 2005, when Calloway announced that it would be his last show, as well as for Free (who spoke via phone), as the show was either presented by Calloway or Wright.

=== Julissa & Big Tigger (2005–2006) ===
On August 1, 2005, 106 & Park had been presented by television personality and model Julissa Bermudez and Rap City: Tha Basement's Big Tigger until July 3, 2006 as temporary replacements for the show before they could find another female co-host for Terrence J. Around this time, Terrence J guest co-hosted the show with Julissa. Celebrities (Bow Wow and Mýa) hosted the show as well.

=== Terrence J & Rocsi (2006–2012) ===
On July 6, 2006, Rocsi (Raquel Diaz), then an afternoon host for Chicago's radio station WPWX (92.3), and Terrence J (Terrence Jenkins) became the hosts after winning BET's "New Faces" contest. On May 29, 2012, Rocsi and Terrence J announced they would be leaving 106 & Park in 2012. Thus beginning a nationwide search for the next hosts of 106 & Park, which started on June 1, 2012 and ended on October 1, 2012. Terrence J and Rocsi's last episode as hosts was broadcast on September 28, 2012. The announcement for the new hosts of 106 & Park was broadcast on Monday.

The highly anticipated farewell episode aired on September 28, 2012, and was hosted by La La Anthony and Pooch Hall. In the taped video messages, several celebrities wish their farewell for Terrence J and Rocsi. They included Jim Jones, French Montana, Julissa and Big Tigger (former hosts of the show), 2 Chainz, Ace Hood, Alicia Keys, Amar'e Stoudemire, Big Sean, B.o.B, Bobby V, Brandy Norwood, Busta Rhymes, Cassidy, Ciara, Common, Doug E. Fresh, DMX, Dwyane Wade, Elle Varner, E-40, Future, Jacob Latimore, Keke Palmer, Mary J. Blige, MGK, Mike Epps, Ne-Yo, Shannon Brown and Monica, Stalley, Rick Ross, Robin Thicke, T.I., Wyclef Jean and Bow Wow (who later hosted with Miss Mykie for next month).

=== Bow Wow & "The Search" (2012–2013) ===
On October 1, 2012, the new hosts for 106 & Park were announced, including Shad "Bow Wow" Moss, Jordan "Shorty da Prince" Johnson, Kimberly "Paigion" Walker and Mykel "Miss Mykie" Gray. For the first time in the show's 12-year history, there were officially four hosts for 106 & Park, instead of two. On January 15, 2013, 106 & Park revealed a new set, graphics, logo, and theme music. On January 23, 2013, former host Rocsi Diaz made an unannounced appearance on the show. New segments included "The Mykie Report", "The Battle of the Sexes", "Girl Chat", "Inside the Rapper's Studio", "Virtually Famous" and other programs with 106 & Park guest correspondent "Franky J" in future works. On July 3, 2013, after several weeks of rumors and speculation about the fates of Johnson, Walker and Gray returning to the show, BET released a statement confirming the news that they would not return to the show. The hosts have never appeared on the show in the nearly two months since May 2013. Bow Wow remained as a permanent host on the show, along with Angela Simmons serving as a temporary co-host for the summer, her last day was on September 30, 2013, along with special guest co-hosts such as Adrienne Bailon.

=== Bow Wow & Keshia Chanté (2013–2014) ===
On September 27, 2013, Canadian rapper Drake made the official announcement that Bow Wow would be joined by another Canadian Keshia Chanté as the official new co-host, who would officially start on October 1, 2013. On November 14, 2014, BET cancelled 106 & Park. The show aired its final episode on December 19, 2014.

== Broadcasting history ==
The show launched as an hour-long show until expanding to 90 minutes in 2001. In New Year's Eve (for all years), the show introduces to its only holiday special, called 106 & Party, along with performances by all artists. In 2008, the show was expanded to two hours with occasional 90-minute episodes during eventual weeks. The show celebrated its 2,000th episode on August 20, 2008. From July 25, 2011 to September 2, 2011, the show was also expanded to three hours.

The show's "10th anniversary" special was on October 6, 2010. The past hosts, A. J. Calloway & Free (original; 2000–2005), Julissa & Big Tigger (2005–2006) returned to the show to celebrate along with current hosts Terrence J and Rocsi.

The show's final episode ("The Final Act") was on December 19, 2014. The past hosts, A. J. Calloway & Free (original; 2000–2005), Julissa & Big Tigger (2005–2006), Terrence J & Rocsi (2006–2012) and Shorty da Prince, Paigion and Miss Mykie of "The Search" (2012–2013) also returned to the show to honor with current hosts Bow Wow and Keshia Chanté with a special guest appearances by Wale and Keyshia Cole.

== Freestyle Friday ==
Each Friday, one popular segment is called Freestyle Friday, featured two aspiring rappers competing in a freestyle battle until the studio audience and celebrity judges, alternating for 30 seconds in each of two rounds.

== BET Experience ==
The show returned during the 2015 BET Experience from Los Angeles. It was hosted by Ray J and Tinashe on June 26, 2015, along with Yara Shahidi, Marcus Scribner and Keshia Chanté on June 27, 2015. It returned again in 2016 for the last time.

== 106 & Park Video Hall of Fame ==
As with TRL's "Retirement Home", a video which appeared on the countdown 65 times would be retired from further countdown consideration and be placed into the "106 & Park Video Hall of Fame". This normally occurred frequently, and earned Bow Wow the permanent title of Mr. 106 & Park, and Aaliyah (died in 2001) the permanent title of Miss 106 & Park for having the most #1's of their respective genders. The final video to be retired was "Ridin'" by Chamillionaire featuring Krayzie Bone on December 19, 2014.

== Reception ==
In 2016 (two years after its end), a New York Times study of the 50 TV shows with the most Facebook likes found that 106 & Park "is popular in the New York metro area, generally"

== See also ==
- 106 & Gospel (a short-lived, religious-themed spin-off that featured with gospel artists)
- 106 & Sports
