= The Black Carpet (TV series) =

- Starring: Danella; Touré
- Country of origin: United States

Production
- Running time: approx. 30 mins (per episode)

Original release
- Network: BET
- Release: July 13, 2006 – December 24, 2008

The Black Carpet is a show that aired on BET. It presented news and gossip about African-American celebrities. BET aired the show weekly after its original premiere on July 13, 2006, when it replaced BET Style. The show's hosts were Touré and Danella.

Touré confirmed that the show was cancelled in late 2008. The last episode was aired on December 24, 2008.
