= BET Style =

- Presented by: Melyssa Ford; Big Tigger
- Country of origin: United States
- Original language: English
- No. of seasons: 1
- No. of episodes: 36

Production
- Executive producer: Candida Boyette

Original release
- Network: BET
- Release: October 5, 2004 – July 6, 2006

BET Style is an entertainment show, much like syndicated Entertainment Tonight, that focuses on African Americans in the entertainment industry. It aired from 2004 to 2006 on BET at 7:30e-p/6:30c on Thursdays. Its hosts were usually Big Tigger and Melyssa Ford. Its last episode was on July 6, 2006. It was replaced by The Black Carpet, a show covering similar material in a new format.
