= Video Vibrations =

Video Vibrations was a 4-hour-long daily video block that showcased popular music videos. It was one of BET's early video shows. The show aired October 1, 1984 until 1997, when it was changed to Vibrations. It was developed to appeal to black audiences and show a wider array of black music than MTV or other networks at the time.

The first video on Video Vibrations was Prince's "When Doves Cry". In the beginning, due to a limited supply of videos from black artists, popular mainstream white artists with crossover appeal were also featured in the lineup. As the supply of videos from black artists expanded, so did BET's position as an influential voice of the music industry.

== Hosts ==
The show was hosted by a VJ speaking offscreen. All three hosts were prominent in radio as well.

- Alvin "The Unseen VJ" Jones (1984–1991), one of BET's other first VJ's, alongside Donnie Simpson.
- "Captain" Paul Porter (1991–1996).
- Lorenzo "Ice Tea" Thomas (1996–1997)

== Popular segments ==
- Rap Week – a segment dedicated to hip-hop and rap. Numerous artists were interviewed as well. This was also the inspiration for Alvin Jones to create Rap City. The show went off the air in 2008.
- The Monday Music Marathon – a showcase of music videos by one artist or genre.

== Music Intros ==
The program did not use a theme song or used any recorded tracks until 1991, when they used the single "Mindflux" from the British act N-Joi as their "theme song" for their intros and breaks up until they left the air in 1997.
