= Video Soul =

- Starring: Donnie Simpson; Sherry Carter
- Country of origin: United States

Production
- Running time: 120 minutes

Original release
- Network: Black Entertainment Television (BET)
- Release: June 26, 1981 – September 1996

Video Soul was a two–hour long American music video program that originally aired on BET from June 26, 1981 to September 1996. The program was devoted to showcasing R&B and Soul recording artists and performers' music videos.

== History ==
Video Soul premiered on June 26, 1981 and was originally a half-hour show. Debuting five weeks before MTV, the show became a domicile for Black talent, whereas MTV refused to play videos by most African-American musicians. Both BET and Video Soul served as a place of refuge for new African-American musical artists (the "Soul" part indicates African-American culture). The expanded two-hour long primetime version premiered on June 26, 1983 and aired from 9 to 11 p.m. E.T., Monday through Thursdays. A top 20 countdown aired Friday nights, 9–11 p.m. E.T. as well. Throughout the early to mid-1990s, until the show ended, it aired from 8 to 10 pm E.T.

Virgil Hemphill was the original first host of the series, calling himself the "Reverend Eldorado". After Hemphill left the series, Donnie Simpson became the show's most prominent VJ although he joined the show a few years after it premiered. Sherry Carter (who also hosted BET's Video LP, a half-hour-long video program) and Sheila Banks were the other hosts. Throughout its run, it was responsible for surprise guests, bringing groups/bands back together, memorable interviews, etc. A number of up-and coming artists had their first interview on Video Soul.

== Other formats ==
Video Soul Top-20 aired on Fridays, and showcased the hottest top 20 videos of the week. It was also known as The Coca-Cola Video Soul Top-20 Countdown, as Coca-Cola became a sponsor of the show. Video Soul By Request was a two-hour long video block on Saturdays. This edition premiered in mid-1992. It showcased videos requested by viewers who called a 1-900 number. Throughout its run, Sherry Carter hosted unseen when she became a host for Video Soul in 1992.

== Revival ==
Donnie Simpson planned to bring back the program in 2019. It was unclear if it would be filmed in Washington, D.C. like the original series. Two years later, the program eventually premiered on Tubi.

== Hosts ==
- Donnie Simpson (1983–1996)
- Sherry Carter (1989–1996)
- Sheila Banks
- Kenya Moore
- Brett Walker (1994–1996)
- Leslie "Big Lez" Segar (1994–1995)
