= Stephanie Charles =

Haitian-American actress

- Born: Boston, Massachusetts, U.S
- Years active: 1997–present

Stephanie Charles is an American actress.

== Biography ==
Charles was born in Boston, Massachusetts to Haitian parents. She speaks both English and Haitian Creole.

== Career ==
She moved to Los Angeles when she was seven years old and later began acting. She appeared in sitcom include Smart Guy, Sister, Sister, and had a recurring role on The Parent 'Hood. Charles later left acting and formed an R&B girl group called MRZ, they were signed to the Universal/Motown label and worked in New York. Then the group broke up, she returned to Los Angeles and began acting again, appearing in film and television.

In 2018, Charles starred in the Oprah Winfrey Network sitcom The Paynes produced by Tyler Perry, playing the role of Nyla. The series was canceled after one season of 38 episodes. Perry later cast her in his BET+ soap opera Ruthless.

== Filmography ==
=== Film/Movie ===
Year	Title	Role	Notes
2011	The Lonely Hour	Samantha	Short
2011	Donatella	Donatella	Short
2011	The Other Side of Sanity	Naleen	Short
2013	Natalie Portman	Stephanie	Short
2013	Diggy Simmons MOW	Sherri Manning	TV movie
2014	Traveler of the East	Anetra Morris / Ariel	Short
2014	Knocked	Keisha	Short
2015	Bound to Vengeance	Nina	
2015	Jacob Stone	Friend	Short
2015	Reggie Gaskins' Urban Love Story	Allison	
2015	Untold	Kim	Short
2015	Wingman Inc.	Angela	
2015	Avouterie	Lola	
2016	New Merica	Janice	Short
2017	Hometown Hero	Michelle	TV movie
2019	Killing Your Daughter	Allie	
2019	Like Blood	Flynn	
2019	Gaslit	Mary Cooper	

=== Television ===
Year	Title	Role	Notes
1997	City Guys	Cheerleader #1	Episode: "The Package"
1998	Smart Guy	Stacie / Leslie	Episode: "Goodbye, Mr. Chimps" & "My Two Dads"
1997-99	The Parent 'Hood	Jamie	Recurring cast: season 4, guest: season 5
1999	Sister, Sister	Holly	Episode: "Mixed Doubles"
2006	ER	Nicole	Episode: "Tell Me No Secrets..."
2008	Bones	Kamaria Manning	Episode: "Player Under Pressure"
2012	G.I.A.	Tia	Episode: "Pilot" & "Night Terrors"
2014	Instant Mom	Jenny	Episode: "48 Hours"
2014	NCIS	Coast Guard Petty Officer Patricia Felton	Episode: "The San Dominick"
2017	The Loonies	Stevie	Main cast
2018	The Paynes	Nyla Payne	Main cast
2018-19	Shameless	Tyesha	Episode: "Do Right, Vote White!" & "Los Diablos!"
2020–	Ruthless	Sarah	Main cast
2022	Black-ish	Jasmine	Episode: "Bow-Mo"
