= Nadège August =

American actress

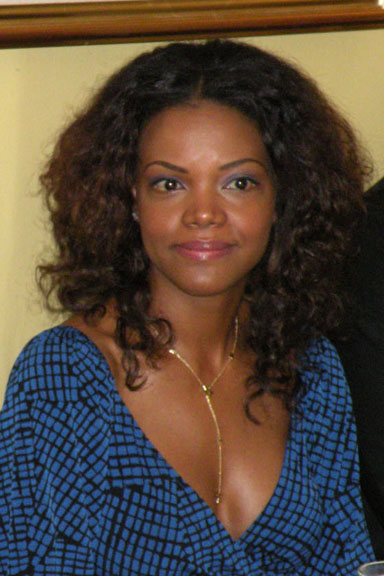
- Nadège August at a press conference in Los Angeles on October 9, 2009
- Born: Brooklyn, New York, U.S.
- Occupations: Actor, producer
- Years active: 2000–present

Nadège August (also credited as Nadège Auguste) is an American actress and podcaster.

== Biography ==
August was born in Brooklyn, New York, but was raised in Haiti from the ages of eight to fourteen. In 2001, she made her feature film debut in role of Ursula, the French-speaking girlfriend of Clifton Powell, in The Brothers. Since then she has appeared in The Princess Diaries 2: Royal Engagement and the female lead in the award-winning independent film Runt. She also starred in and produced the short film Solus, which was screened at several film festivals. She has appeared on episodes of the television series Criminal Minds, 1600 Penn, Dexter, ER, The Unit, and Accidentally on Purpose. She is the creator, writer, executive producer, and star actress of the web series Bougie Dilemma on YouTube. She also appears as Joan in Tyler Perry's Ruthless on BET+ and plays Darlene Wilson in Nickelodeon's Young Dylan

August has also performed on stage, and is a member of the Actors Studio organization. In 2019, She won Desert Theatre League Outstanding Supporting Actress Award for playing in David Lindsay-Abaire Good People Coachella Valley Repertory. In 2008, she received an NAACP Theatre Award nomination for her role of Abbie Putnam in a production of Eugene O'Neill's Desire Under the Elms.

August hosts the weekly podcast What the Fockery?

== Filmography ==
=== Film ===
Year	Title	Role	Notes
2001	The Brothers	Ursula	
2001	Focus	Anisa	
2004	The Princess Diaries 2: Royal Engagement	Princess Nadege	
2004	Silver Lake	Marla Rowan	TV movie
2005	Runt	Cynthia Davis	
2005	Break a Leg	Crying Actress in Class	
2006	Solus	Claudine Vincent	Short
2007	Talk to Me	Caller (voice)	
2007	Murdering Mama's Boy	Eugenia	Short
2009	Carla	Carla Williamson	Short
2011	Bosco's Guitar	Faty	Short
2012	Undercover Bridesmaid	Kimmy	TV movie
2013	The Last Letter	Cheryl	
2014	Friend Request	Ms. Marlow	TV movie
2014	Get on Up	Additional Voice	
2015	Baby Steps	Tekisha	
2015	Raven's Touch	Angela	
2021	Out of Time	Lisa	

=== Television ===
Year	Title	Role	Notes
2000	Malcolm & Eddie	Sameedra Hill	Episode: "Your Number's Up"
2000	City Guys	Mariah	Episode: "Makin' Up Is Hard to Do"
2001	First Years	Marie	Episode: "The First Thing You Do..."
2001	18 Wheels of Justice	Elise Betrie	Episode: "A Family Upside Down"
2004	ER	Mrs. Lemonier	Episode: "Get Carter"
2006	The Unit	Elsabet	Episode: "Unannounced"
2009	Accidentally on Purpose	Beautiful Woman	Episode: "Pilot"
2011	Mr. Sunshine	Tanya	Episode: "The Assistant"
2012	Make It or Break It	Nina	Episode: "It Takes Two"
2012	The Mentalist	Female Cyclist	Episode: "If It Bleeds, It Leads"
2013	1600 Penn	Vanessa	Episode: "Skip the Tour"
2013	Happy Endings	Leslie Gruff	Episode: "The Straight Dope"
2013	Criminal Minds	Sheila Goode	Episode: "Restoration"
2013	Dexter	Receptionist	Episode: "A Beautiful Day" & "Are We There Yet?"
2014	Castle	Leslie	Episode: "Dressed to Kill"
2014	Key & Peele	Girl in Club	Episode: "Old Ladies and Satan"
2015	Bougie Dilemma	Nadège Bourgeoise	Main cast
2016	The Millionaires	Salah	Recurring cast
2018	Alex, Inc.	Rebecca	Episode: "The Wax Museum" & "The Internet Trolls"
2020-21	Tyler Perry's Young Dylan	Darlene Wilson	Recurring cast: season 1, guest: season 2
2020-	Ruthless	Joan	Recurring cast

== Awards and recognition ==
- 2019: DTL Outstanding Supporting Actress - Drama- Professional Winner
- 2008: NAACP Theatre Award nomination, Best Supporting Female - Local, Desire Under the Elms
- 2016 NAACP Theatre Award for Best Lead Female- Local Nomination for "Sunset Baby" by Dominique Morisseau
