= Melissa L. Williams =

American actress and model

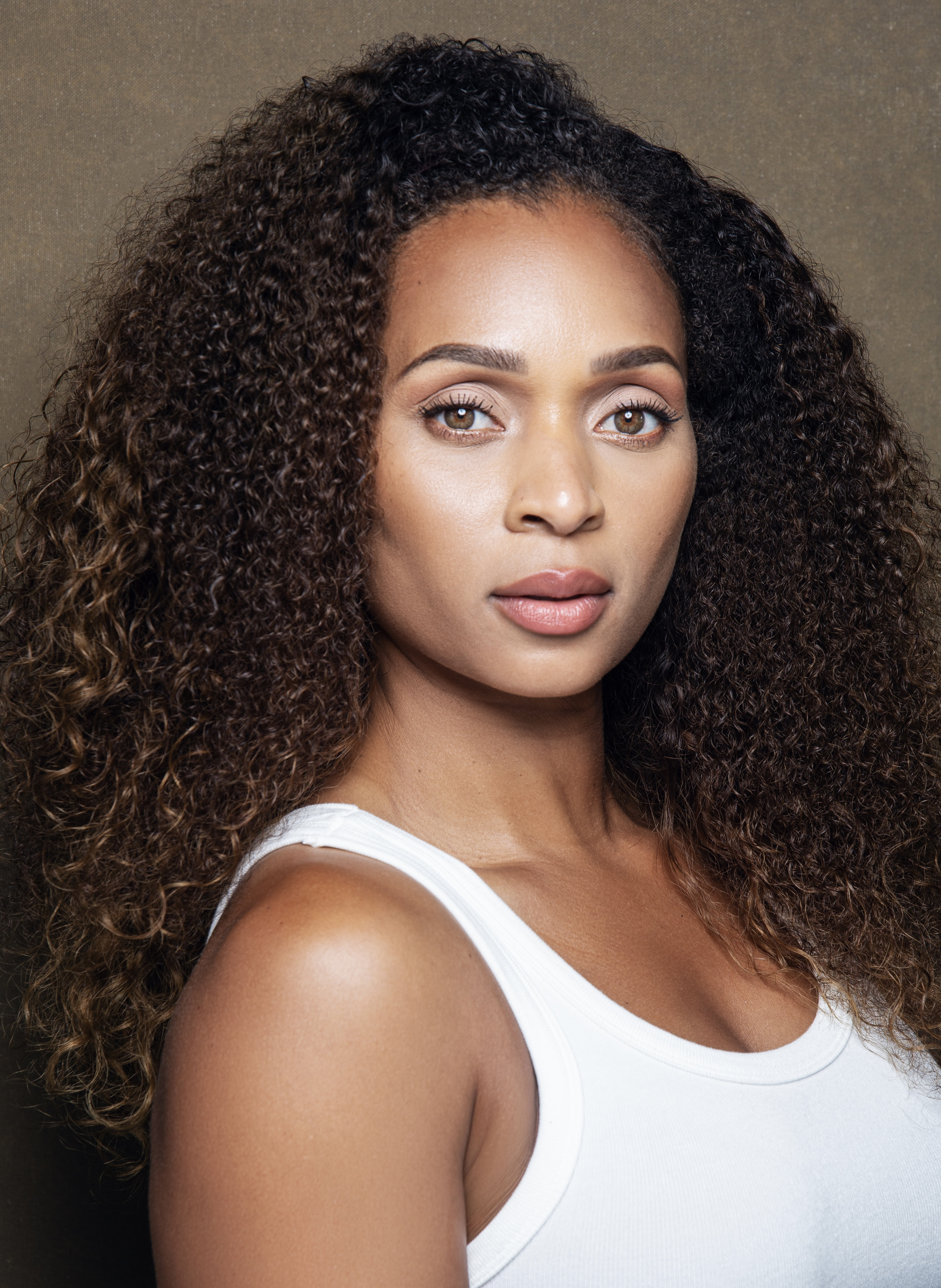
- Born: Oklahoma City, Oklahoma, U.S.
- Occupations: Actress and singer
- Years active: 2011–present

Melissa L. Williams is an American actress and singer, widely recognized for her standout performances in Tyler Perry's hit series The Oval, where she portrays both Denise and Ruth. She also stars in the spin-off series Ruthless.

== Life and career ==
Williams was born in Oklahoma City, Oklahoma. She is the oldest of seven children. Williams moved to Atlanta and attended Clark Atlanta University. She began her career appearing in several musicals at the local theater before moving to Los Angeles. On television, she guest starred on The Game, If Loving You Is Wrong and Rosewood. She received Indie Series Awards nomination for her performance in Poz Roz.

In 2019, Tyler Perry cast Williams in a dual role as twin sisters in his BET prime time soap opera The Oval. She later went to star in its spinoff Ruthless for streaming service BET+.

== Filmography ==
=== Film ===
Year	Title	Role	Notes
2017	The First Stone	Reigh	
2017	Escape Artist	Beatrice Evans	
2021	Dutch	Nina	
2023	Game of Deceit	Elle	
2024	Dutch II: Angel's Revenge	Nina	
2025	Never Alone 4 Christmas Memphis	Monica	

=== Television ===
Year	Title	Role	Notes
2015	The Game	Jasmine	Episode: "Get Up, Stand Up"
2016	If Loving You Is Wrong	Grace	Episodes: "An Evil Alliance" & "For Pete"
2017	Rosewood	Woman #1	Episode: "Mummies and Meltdowns"
2017	Hand of God	Nurse	Episode: "Not Writing a Love Letter"
2017-18	Wade's World	Vanessa	Episodes: "AfterMath" & "Chess Not Checkers"
2018	Me, Myself & I	Beyonce Impersonator	Episode: "The Breakup"
2019	Hello Cupid 3.0	Zaya	Main cast
2019	Poz Roz	Amber	Recurring cast
2019–21	The Oval	Denise Truesdale/Ruth Truesdale	Recurring cast: season 1-2
2020–	Ruthless	Ruth Truesdale	Main cast

== Awards and nominations ==
Year	Awards	Category	Recipient	Outcome
2019	Indie Series Awards	Indie Series Award for Best Supporting Actress - Drama	"Poz Roz"	Nominated
