= Isaiah Johnson (actor) =

American actor and singer

- Occupations: Actor; singer; professor
- Years active: 2008–present
- Known for: Hamilton

Isaiah Johnson is an American actor and singer. He is best known for his performance in the role of George Washington in various productions of Lin-Manuel Miranda’s stage musical, Hamilton.

He’s also served as the professor of the performing arts at the Savannah College of Art and Design.

== Education ==
Johnson studied at Howard University and the New York University Tisch School of the Arts.

== Acting credits ==
=== Stage ===
Ref:

| Year(s) | Production | Role | Notes |
|---|---|---|---|
| 2008 | Big River | Jim | Olney Theatre Center |
| 2010–2011 | The Merchant of Venice | Prince of Morocco | Broadhurst Theatre, Broadway |
| 2011–2012 | Richard III | Lord Mayor of London / Earl Rivers | International tour |
| 2012–2013 | Peter and the Starcatcher | Captain Scott | Brooks Atkinson Theatre, Broadway |
| 2013 | Othello | Othello | Hudson Guild Theatre |
| 2014 | The Music Man | Harold Hill | New Jersey Performing Arts Center |
| 2014 | Hamilton | George Washington | Workshop |
| 2014 | Randy Newman's Faust | The Lord | New York City Center, Off-Broadway |
| 2014–2015 | Side Show | Swing | St. James Theatre, Broadway |
| 2015–2016 | The Color Purple | Mister | Bernard B. Jacobs Theatre, Broadway |
| 2017–2018 | Hamilton | George Washington | US National Tour |
| 2019 | Hamilton | George Washington | Luis A. Ferré Performing Arts Center |
| 2019 | Hamilton | George Washington | Orpheum Theatre |
| 2023 | The Tempest | Prospero | Seattle Repertory Theatre |
| 2026 | Hamilton | George Washington | Richard Rodgers Theatre, Broadway |

=== Screen ===
| Year(s) | Production | Role | Notes |
|---|---|---|---|
| 2012 | Person of Interest | Monty Spencer | Episode: "Masquerade" |
| 2013 | Think Tank | Lawrence | 5 episodes |
| 2014 | Homegirls | Brandon | 3 episodes |
| 2014 | The Knick | Man Who Stabbed Sears | Episode: "Get the Rope" |
| 2017 | Curb Your Enthusiasm | George Washington | Episode: "The Shucker" |
| 2019–2021 | David Makes Man | Sky | 13 episodes |
| 2020 | Nancy Drew | Bashir | Episode: "The Phantom of Bonny Scot" |
| 2020–2021 | All Rise | Leon Parson | 2 episodes |
| 2023 | Caught Up | Terrell | Episode: "Complicated" |
| 2023 | Florida Man | Benny | 7 episodes |
| 2024 | Blue Bloods | Jeff Willard | Episode: "New York Minute" |
| 2024 | FBI: Most Wanted | Shawn Odunze | Episode: "Highway to Hell" |
| 2025 | Law & Order | Darius Cain | Episode: "Inherent Bias" |
