= Love & Murder: Atlanta Playboy =

2023 crime drama movie series

- Genre: Crime; Drama; Romance; Musical
- Based on: Redbone: Money, Malice and Murder in Atlanta by Ron Stodghill
- Written by: Gregory R. Anderson
- Directed by: Jaira Thomas
- Starring: Taye Diggs; Keesha Sharp; Ciera Payton; Apryl Jones; Ernestine Johnson; Nicole Lyn; Rob Brown; Tye White; Yung Joc; Donzaleigh Abernathy; David Vaughn; Anton Peeples; Thea Camara; Monica Pearson; Mark Taylor; Karlie Redd; Yandy Smith
- Composer: Ozzy Doniz
- Country of origin: United States
- Original language: English
- No. of episodes: 2

Production
- Executive producers: Stephanie R. Gayle; Mona Scott-Young; Abbey MacDonald; Marvin Neil; Lorisa Bates; Eric Tomosunas; Nick Roses; Ron Stodghill
- Producers: Keith Neal; Ron Robinson; Jimmy Watson; Brian Rikuda; Devin Griffin; Eric Tomosunas; Ron Stodghill
- Editor: Aaron Putnam
- Running time: 98 minutes (Part 1); 93 minutes (Part 2)
- Production companies: Monami Productions; Swirl Films

Original release
- Network: BET+
- Release: September 21 – September 28, 2023

Love & Murder: Atlanta Playboy is an American two-part crime drama movie series that premiered on BET+ on September 21, 2023.

== Cast ==
Character	Title	
Character	Part 1	Part 2
Lance Herndon	Taye Diggs	Taye Diggs
Blair Herndon	Keesha Sharp	Keesha Sharp
Sophia Smith	Ciera Payton	Ciera Payton
Harmony West	Apryl Jones	Apryl Jones
Delyse Burnell	Ernestine Johnson	Ernestine Johnson
Khloe Cross	Nicole Lyn	Nicole Lyn
Carter Brighton	Rob Brown	Rob Brown
Prosecutor Ryan Sullivan	Tye White	Tye White
Theo "Trip"	Yung Joc	Yung Joc
Isabelle Herndon	Donzaleigh Abernathy	Donzaleigh Abernathy
Detective Colin De Luca	David Vaughn	David Vaughn
Detective James Curtis	Anton Peeples	Anton Peeples
Mrs. Piedmont	Thea Camara	Thea Camara
Charlotte Ambrose	Monica Pearson	Monica Pearson
Ivan Cross	Mark Taylor	Mark Taylor
Careesha	Karlie Redd	Karlie Redd
Kehlani	Yandy Smith	Yandy Smith

== Episodes ==
No.	Title	Directed by	Written by	Original release date	BET air date	U.S. linear viewers (millions)
1	"Part 1"	Jaira Thomas	Gregory R. Anderson	September 21, 2023	February 16, 2024	N/A
2	"Part 2"	Jaira Thomas	Gregory R. Anderson	September 28, 2023	February 17, 2024	N/A

== Production ==
=== Development ===
Part 1 of the series premiered on September 21, 2024 while Part 2 premiered a week after.

=== Casting ===
In April 2023, Taye Diggs was cast in the leading role. Two days later, Keesha Sharp was cast in a leading role opposite Diggs. In May 2023, Rob Brown, Ciera Payton, Nicole Lyn, Apryl Jones and Ernestine Johnson were added to the cast.
