= Love You to Death =

Love You to Death may refer to:

- Love You to Death (band), a Canadian pop punk band
- Love You to Death (album), 2016 album by Tegan and Sara
- Love You to Death (2012 film), a Hindi-language comedy film
- Love You to Death (2019 film), a film that aired on Lifetime
- Love You to Death (American TV series), a 2023 docuseries
- Love You to Death (Spanish TV series), a 2025 romantic comedy television series
- "Love You to Death", a song by Type O Negative from their album October Rust
- "Love You to Death", a song by Taeyang from his album Rise
- "Love You to Death", a song by Kill Hannah from their album Until There's Nothing Left of Us
- "Love You to Death", a song by Kamelot from their album Ghost Opera
- Love You to Death, an alternative title of the novel Shadowland by Meg Cabot
- Love You to Death, an alternative title for the American TV series 'Til Death Do Us Part in Canada and Australia
- "Love You to Death" (Forever Knight), the final episode of the first season of Forever Knight

== See also ==
- I Love You to Death, 1990 film
