= David Makes Man =

2019 American drama television series

- Promotional poster
- Genre: Coming-of-age; Drama
- Created by: Tarell Alvin McCraney
- Starring: Akili McDowell; Alana Arenas; Isaiah Johnson; Ade Chike Torbert; Travis Coles; Cayden K. Williams; Nathaniel Logan McIntyre; Jordan Bolger; Phylicia Rashad
- Composer: Gary Gunn
- Country of origin: United States
- Original language: English
- No. of seasons: 2
- No. of episodes: 20

Production
- Executive producers: Dee Harris-Lawrence; Tarell Alvin McCraney; Mike Kelley; Melissa Loy; Michael B. Jordan; John J. Strauss; Oprah Winfrey
- Running time: 41–57 minutes
- Production companies: Warner Horizon Scripted Television (season 1); Warner Bros. Television (season 2); Page Fright; Outlier Society Productions; Harpo Films

Original release
- Network: OWN
- Release: August 14, 2019 – August 24, 2021

David Makes Man is an American coming-of-age drama television series that premiered on August 14, 2019, on OWN. In December 2019, OWN renewed the series for a second season which premiered on June 22, 2021.

== Premise ==
David Makes Man follows a 14-year-old named David "from the projects who is haunted by the death of his friend and relied on by his hardworking mother to find a way out of poverty."

== Cast and characters ==
=== Main ===
- Akili McDowell as David
  - Kwame Patterson as Adult David (season 2)
- Alana Arenas as Gloria, David's and JG's mother
- Phylicia Rashad as Dr. Woods-Trap
- Nathaniel Logan McIntyre as Seren
  - Kyle Beltran as Adult Seren (recurring season 2)
- Isaiah Johnson as Sky
- Ade Chike Torbert as Raynan
- Jordan Bolger as Shinobi
- Cayden K. Williams as JG (Jonathan Greg), David's younger brother and Gloria's younger son
  - Arlen Escarpeta as Adult JG (season 2)
- Travis Coles as Mx. Elijah
- Daniel Augustin as Eman
- Gillian Williams as Jessica Kelly
- Ruben Santiago-Hudson as Dr. Bree
- Elvis Nolasco as Tio-Teo
- Randy Gonzalez as Mr. Lopez
- Lela Rochon as Alma
- Trace Lysette as Femi
- Liza Colón-Zayas as Principal Fallow
- Juanita Jennings as Mrs. Hertrude
- Lindsey Blackwell as Marissa
  - Erica Luttrell as Adult Marissa (season 2)
- Solomon Valdez as Willie Derrick
- Teshi Thomas as Tare
  - Aba Arthur as Adult Tare (season 2)
- Nick Creegan as Desmond
- Kimaya Naomi as Shella
  - Zsané Jhé as Adult Shella (season 2)
- Logan Rozos as Star Child
- Tony Plana as Joe Padilla (season 2)
- Brittany S. Hall as Nicole (season 2)
- Bobbi Baker as Robin (season 2)
- Patrice Arenas as Denise (season 2)
- Trinity Cidel as Trenise (season 2)
- Brandi Huzzie as Trisha (season 2)
- Rodney Gardiner as Corey Roberts (season 2)
- Janmarco Santiago as Elan (season 2)

== Episodes ==
=== Series overview ===
Season	Episodes	Originally released	
Season	Episodes	First released	Last released
1	10	August 14, 2019	October 16, 2019
2	10	June 22, 2021	August 24, 2021

=== Season 1 (2019) ===
No. overall	No. in season	Title	Directed by	Written by	Original release date	U.S. viewers (millions)
1	1	"David's Sky"	Michael Francis Williams	Tarell Alvin McCraney	August 14, 2019	0.537
An introduction to David's world. At school, David acts out and jokes around, but all is not what it seems. At the Ville, he acts as a protector to his brother JG and has to navigate the more dangerous aspects of his living situation. Throughout all of this, he's haunted by a person from his past.
2	2	"Dai Out"	Kiel Adrian Scott	Tarell Alvin McCraney & Lucien Christian Adderley & Richard "Byrd" Wilson	August 21, 2019	0.425
David takes JG to JG's grandfather's house, but is joined by an unwanted guest. David has to make up for his failure as lookout by delivering a package all while trying to beat his mother home from her shift. On his journey home, he meets Femi and Star. Star is on his way to the Ville to stay with Mx. Elijah.
3	3	"MJB"	Kiel Adrian Scott	Teleplay by : Tarell Alvin McCraney; Story by : Tarell Alvin McCraney & Lucien Christian Adderley & Richard "Byrd" Wilson	August 28, 2019	0.461
David meets with the school counselor. Dr. Woods-Trap tasks David with incorporating Seren into his "Where I came from presentation," and tells him he will have to present the next day or lose 50 points on his grade. Seren will only help if David spends the night. David gets a glimpse into Seren's seemingly picturesque home life as well as a glimpse into his parents' behavior.
4	4	"Gloria"	Kiel Adrian Scott	Denitria Harris-Lawrence	September 4, 2019	0.503
Gloria starts the day hopeful about a job promotion, but her day gets progressively worse, with rude customers, sexual harassment, a bad fall leaving her left side bruised, and then getting fired. When she arrives at home, JG has caused issues with the landlord after he set his bed sheets on fire after having another accident. Mx. Elijah tries to cheer Gloria up by taking her to the Gala, but, after a fantasy of a fun night, Gloria declines.
5	5	"Love or Poetize These Hoes"	Daina Reid	Jaquen Castellanos	September 11, 2019	0.549
Gloria is at home full-time and discovers David's school is throwing a school dance and tells him he is attending and has to ask a girl. He initially asks Marissa, who looks shocked and excited, but when he tells her he's only asking because he had to ask someone, she declines and asks Seren instead. David asks a girl from the Ville, Tare. At the dance, she's able to easily feel comfortable, but David is constantly guarded. Frustrated, Tare leaves. David follows her home on the bus where they start to bond.
6	6	"When It All Falls"	Daina Reid	John J. Strauss	September 18, 2019	0.349
Gloria struggles with the bureaucracy associated with unemployment, as well as her sobriety. JG sells the sneakers his grandfather gave him to pay the rent, but put cash into the dropbox, not realizing it can easily be stolen. David attends an informational session for Hurston, and plays up his situation, to the dismay of Dr. Woods-Trap, whose recommendation he is desperately seeking. David and Gloria both make questionable decisions in order to get the rent paid.
7	7	"Son of Man"	Daina Reid	Allison Davis	September 25, 2019	0.300
It's Halloween! And also the day of Seren's big church solo. David accompanies the Kelly's to church, and sees more evidence of the turmoil Seren deals with at home. The Kelly's drop David off at the Ville and Gloria invites Seren to stay for Halloween, and Mx. Elijah helps Seren and David with their costumes. David, meanwhile, is also working to make his prescription pad theft worth the risk, and starts to formulate a plan on how to get pills to sell without getting caught, with Mx. Elijah even in on the scheme. Seren leaves the Ville, but hands David a note before he departs.
8	8	"Bubble House"	Cheryl Dunye	John J. Strauss & Jaquen Castellanos	October 2, 2019	0.291
A hurricane is coming, but there are bigger issues in David's world. Seren is missing, and his parents think David had something to do with it. Dr. Bree suspects David of stealing his prescription pad. Dr. Woods-Trap scolds David for how he uses his situation to his advantage again and David calls her out on it, and may have cost himself a recommendation letter. Meanwhile, in the Ville, the prescription drug scheme results in a raid, a loss of life, and David finding out Raynan's involvement in Sky's murder. One bright spot, Mx. Elijah lets David know one plan of his was actually a success as the "package" arrived in Tampa.
9	9	"Some I Love Who Are Dead"	Cheryl Dunye	Allison Davis & Denitria Harris-Lawrence	October 9, 2019	0.370
The residents of the Ville deal with the loss of one of their own while preparing for the oncoming hurricane. Raynan has to hunker down with the people he wants to avoid most. Gloria reluctantly takes David and JG to her mother's where both their past mistakes are dredged up. David and Gloria have a heart to heart.
10	10	"3 Sons' Sky"	Cheryl Dunye	Teleplay by : Tarell Alvin McCraney; Story by : Lucien Christian Adderley & Richard "Byrd" Wilson	October 16, 2019	0.333
The hurricane has passed and residents return to the Ville, but they are still not safe. David realizes he must end the prescription pad scheme and find a way to rid the Ville of Desmond, Shinobi, and Teo for good. Mrs. Kelly returns to the Ville looking for Seren and continues to accuse David of knowing something. Gloria struggles. David and Tare continue to connect.

=== Season 2 (2021) ===
No. overall	No. in season	Title	Directed by	Written by	Original release date	U.S. viewers (millions)
11	1	"Barrel of Oranges"	Kiel Adrian Scott	Teleplay by : Tarell Alvin McCraney; Story by : Lucien Christian Adderley & Richard Wilson	June 22, 2021	0.365
Years have passed. David is now a strategic marketer for urban planning, JG is a cop now married with a teenage daughter, and Gloria is 15 years sober running a home for foster children. David is working toward becoming a partner at his firm and taking big swings with a new client. JG and Gloria haven't forgotten the ville, and JG still visits Mx. Elijiah to bring groceries. While making a trip, JG tries to break apart a fight and is accidentally shot. He makes it to the hospital and is breathing on his own, but the doctors say there is internal bleeding that will require surgery.
12	2	"Hurston"	Kiel Adrian Scott	Lucien Christian Adderley & Richard Wilson	June 29, 2021	0.356
A flashback to David's sophomore year at Hurston. At first, David appears to be well acclimated to the school and has several friends, but he is constantly reminded of how he is different from the other boys at his school. He eventually gets suspended for fighting after his "friend" repeatedly uses a racial slur. When he returns, his friends continue to provoke him resulting in a swimming race where David gets a leg cramp and almost drowns. It is revealed to be the dream of an adult David. When he wakes up, he gets a phone call from his mom urging him to come to the hospital.
13	3	"Y'all Gucci"	Erica A. Watson	Kristin Palombo & John J. Strauss	July 6, 2021	0.339
JG's condition improves, but the doctors find more damage once they operate and recommend inducing a coma. David has trouble coping and walks out of a therapy session. At work, Joe Padilla is less than pleased with opposition coming from the environmentalist so he assigns Elan to be David's assistant. JG is released from the hospital after being in a coma for 5 days and goes back to his mother's house for a welcome home party. Sheela stops by and reconnects with JG. David goes back to therapy, ostensibly to quit, but his therapist tells him why he needs to continue, resulting in him seeing more visions of people from his past.
14	4	"Savage, Classy, Bougie, Ratchet"	Erica A. Watson	Denitria Harris-Lawrence	July 13, 2021	0.453
Many things are happening in the Ville. Sheela is trying to get payment from delinquent renters. David stops by to do some more reconnaissance for his development project and runs into Marissa doing environmental work. Sheela confronts David to find out whats going on and reaches out to Gloria to get some help in stopping David's plan. David spends some time with Mx. Elijah at their home for the first time in 15 years and sees how difficult things have become for them. JG stops by the Ville to drop off groceries for Mx. Elijah and connects with Sheela.
15	5	"My Own Best Friend"	Kiel Adrian Scott	Jaquen Castellanos	July 20, 2021	0.349
David tries to think positively but he ends up making a bigger mess of things. At work, Joe realizes David lied by omission about JG and feels he cannot work with him until David comes up with a plan that hinges on JG's help, which JG is reluctant to give. JG and Trish are fighting and their daughter hears everything, leading her to consider running away. David also messes things up with Nicole by telling her too much information. Aside from all things going on in David's life he runs into Tare and the two catch up.
16	6	"Vizcaya"	Erica A. Watson	Tarell Alvin McCraney	July 27, 2021	0.336
David finally reunites with Seren on the night of the charity event, and there are more surprise visitors abound. Shella feels uncomfortable in more ways than one. David stages a plea at the event to get Joe to change his mind about the mall and develop homes instead, which Joe accepts, as planned. David come to terms that he needs an escape so he turns to Seren for help.
17	7	"No Atheists in Rabbit Holes"	Kiel Adrian Scott	Allison Davis	August 3, 2021	0.177
David spends the night at Seren's as he and JG both deal with fallout from the charity event. Seren reveals the real reason why he stayed away from Miami all these years. JG goes looking for comfort and may have created a bigger problem. David returns to the Ville and gets a much needed pep talk from Mx. Elijah.
18	8	"Chaos is Come Again"	Kiel Adrian Scott	John J. Strauss	August 10, 2021	0.182
David goes to therapy hoping his therapist can be used as a strategy session, but he ends up spending an intense hour working on his inner demons and realizing why his life is so filled with chaos.
19	9	"Homecoming"	Erica A. Watson	Denitria Harris-Lawrence & Jaquen Castellanos	August 17, 2021	0.111
David allows his inner child to express himself with surprising results, including a realization. JG is struggling with the fallout of the shooting, but, to complicate matters, his daughter Trenise goes missing. Gloria, JG, and David look for her in the Ville, but each end up leaving with a new perspective of their behavior. David gets a surprise when he goes into his apartment: he finds Trenise sitting there.
20	10	"Trouble the Water"	Erica A. Watson	Allison Davis & Tarell Alvin McCraney	August 24, 2021	0.144
Trenise shows up at David's, informing JG. He later, with her help, finds a way to solve the problems with the Ville and Joe Padilla with a new perspective so, he, Shella, and Mx. Elijah along with the rest of the Ville residents, team up for a major turnaround with the board meeting, which turns into a success. David reconnects with Nicole and has a heart to heart with Gloria about her upcoming move. JG and Shella are honest with each other.

== Production ==
=== Development ===
On August 16, 2017, it was reported that Oprah Winfrey Network had given the production a straight-to-series order created by Tarell Alvin McCraney. On June 26, 2018, it was announced that Dee Harris-Lawrence will be the showrunner and set to serve as an executive producer along with Tarell Alvin McCraney, Mike Kelley, Melissa Loy, Michael B. Jordan, and Oprah Winfrey. Production companies involved with the series were slated to include Warner Horizon Scripted Television, Page Fright, and Outlier Productions. The series was set to premiere on August 14, 2019. The pilot episode was premiered at South by Southwest on March 10, 2019. On December 19, 2019, OWN renewed the series for a second season. On June 29, 2020, HBO Max acquired the streaming rights for the series which was debuted on July 16, 2020. The series' producer Dee Harris-Lawrence most recently signed an overall deal with Warner Bros. Television Studios. The second season premiered on June 22, 2021.

=== Casting ===
In June 2018, it was announced that Akili McDowell, Phylicia Rashad, Nathaniel Logan McIntyre, Isaiah Johnson, Ade Chike Torbert, Jordan Bolger, Cayden K. Williams, and Travis Coles are cast as series regulars. In August 2018, Alana Arenas has been cast as a series regular while Gillian Williams, Ruben Santiago-Hudson, Elvis Nolasco, and Randy Gonzalez are cast in recurring roles. On October 25, 2018, Lela Rochon, Trace Lysette, Liza Colón-Zayas, Juanita Jennings, Lindsey Blackwell, Solomon Valdez, Teshi Thomas, and newcomers Nick Creegan, Kimaya Naomi and Logan Rozos have joined the series in recurring roles. On August 6, 2020, Kwame Patterson and Arlen Escarpeta were cast in starring roles for the second season. On December 8, 2020, Tony Plana, Brittany S. Hall, Erica Luttrell, Zsané Jhé, Bobbi Baker, Patrice Arenas, Trinity Cidel, Brandi Huzzie, Rodney Gardiner, and Janmarco Santiago joined the cast in recurring roles for the second season.

=== Filming ===
Production began in the summer of 2018 in Orlando, Florida.

== Reception ==
=== Critical response ===
On review aggregator Rotten Tomatoes, the series holds an approval rating of 100% based on 23 reviews, with an average rating of 8.98/10. The website's critical consensus reads, "Powerful, beautiful, and like nothing else on TV, David Makes Man blends dreamy aesthetics with an empathetically crafted story to create a truly unique viewing experience." On Metacritic, it has a weighted average score of 81 out of 100, based on 11 critics, indicating "universal acclaim".

=== Accolades ===
Year	Award	Category	Nominee(s)	Result	Ref
2019	Gotham Awards	Breakthrough Series - Longform	David Makes Man	Nominated	
2019	Critics' Choice Television Awards	Best Drama Series	David Makes Man	Nominated	
2020	Peabody Awards	Entertainment	David Makes Man	Won	
