= Caught Up =

Caught Up may refer to:

- Caught Up (film), directed by Darin Scott, 1998
  - Caught Up (soundtrack), the soundtrack to the 1998 crime film
- Caught Up (TV series), an American television series
- Caught Up (Millie Jackson album), 1974
- Caught Up (EP), by Sarah Close, 2017
- "Caught Up" (Ja Rule song), 2004
- "Caught Up" (Usher song), 2004
- "Caught Up", by Flo from Access All Areas, 2024
- "Caught Up", by John Legend from Love in the Future, 2013
- "Caught Up", by Kevin Federline from Playing with Fire, 2006
- "Caught Up", by Snoop Doggy Dogg from Death Row: The Lost Sessions Vol. 1, 2009
