= Beast (2022 American film) =

Film directed by Baltasar Kormákur

- Theatrical release poster
- Directed by: Baltasar Kormákur
- Screenplay by: Ryan Engle
- Story by: Jaime Primak Sullivan
- Produced by: Will Packer; Baltasar Kormákur; James Lopez
- Starring: Idris Elba; Sharlto Copley; Iyana Halley; Leah Jeffries
- Cinematography: Philippe Rousselot
- Edited by: Jay Rabinowitz
- Music by: Steven Price
- Production companies: Will Packer Productions; RVK Studios
- Distributed by: Universal Pictures
- Release date: August 19, 2022 (United States)
- Running time: 93 minutes
- Countries: Iceland; South Africa; United States
- Language: English
- Budget: $36 million
- Box office: $59.1 million

Beast is a 2022 survival action horror film directed by Baltasar Kormákur from a screenplay by Ryan Engle, based on a story by Jaime Primak Sullivan, and starring Idris Elba, Iyana Halley, Leah Jeffries and Sharlto Copley. It follows a widowed father and his two teenage daughters who visit a South African game reserve, but must fight to survive when they are stalked and attacked by a ferocious, rogue, man-killing lion.

Beast was released in the United States on August 19, 2022, by Universal Pictures. The film received generally positive reviews from critics, while grossing just over $59 million on a $36 million production budget.

== Plot ==
Recently widowed Dr. Nate Samuels and his daughters, Meredith and Norah, arrive at the Mopani Reserve in South Africa for a vacation. Nate reunites with his old friend, Martin Battles, a biologist and Mopani manager, who introduced Nate and his wife. Martin takes Nate and the girls to the village where Nate's wife grew up. Nate confides in Martin his guilt over being distant following his and his wife's separation, after which she developed terminal cancer. The trip is to reconnect with his daughters.

The next day, Martin and the family tour the reserve's restricted areas. Martin shows the trio a local lion pride that he helped raise, and notices that one of them is injured. At a nearby Tsonga community, Martin discovers that most of the population has been killed. Suspecting that a rogue lion is responsible, Martin rushes back to report the finding. Nate encounters an injured Tsonga man on the road, but is unable to save him. Martin is attacked by the rogue male lion; it then ambushes Nate, who takes cover in the car. Meredith speeds away but crashes into a tree, stranding them.

Martin radios Nate on a walkie-talkie, warning him to stay away, as the lion may be using Martin as bait to lure the others out. As the radio is out of range to contact help, Nate assembles a tranquilizer rifle, hoping to subdue the lion long enough to recover Martin and trek back to civilization. The lion attacks, and Meredith takes advantage of the distraction to save Martin. Norah stabs the lion with a tranquilizer dart after it knocks the gun from Nate's hands, causing the lion to retreat. Meredith brings Martin back to the car, and Nate treats his wound.

As night falls, a now-recovering Martin speculates that the lion went rogue after poachers killed its pride. Soon after, the poachers arrive and initially agree to transport the group to the village in exchange for payment, but tensions rise after they spot Martin, an avid anti-poacher, inside the car. The lion attacks and scatters the poachers, killing most of them. Nate maneuvers his way past the lion and finds the poachers' truck keys. Back in the car, Martin holds the lion off long enough to allow the sisters to escape, though Meredith sustains a deep laceration to her side. The car falls into a ravine and Martin sacrifices himself by setting off an explosion from the leaking gasoline, severely burning the lion. Nate starts the truck and races away with Meredith and Norah, but has to stop before they run out of fuel. They leave the truck and walk to an abandoned schoolhouse nearby, which the poachers used as their base.

Nate treats Meredith's wound and forages for water. The lion appears and stalks the girls, but Nate returns and scares it off. Locking his daughters inside a room, he promises to return after subduing the lion. After provoking the lion into chasing him, Nate lures it to the local lion pride. The rogue lion overtakes and mauls Nate, nearly killing him, but the lion pride's males, Kuda and Kawe, intervene and kill the rogue. A Mopani worker named Banji arrives and saves Nate as he loses consciousness.

Awakening in a hospital, a recovering Nate tells his daughters he loves them. Sometime later, the three return to the reserve, this time as a united family, and recreate the photo Nate's late wife took of herself next to her favorite tree.

== Cast ==
- Idris Elba as Dr. Nate Samuels, a widowed father
- Iyana Halley as Meredith Samuels, the elder daughter of Nate who is rebellious and argumentative
- Leah Sava Jeffries as Norah Samuels, the younger daughter of Nate who is more sensitive
- Sharlto Copley as Martin Battles, a wildlife biologist who is Nate's old friend
- Naledi Mogadime as Amahle, Nate's wife and the girls' mother, who died from cancer
- Tafara Nyatsansa as Banji, a Mopani worker
- Martin Munro as Kees
- Ronald McWanazi as Mutende

== Production ==
=== Development ===
In September 2020, it was announced that Idris Elba would star in a new Universal Pictures film titled Beast, based on an original idea by Jaime Primak-Sullivan and directed by Baltasar Kormákur. In June 2021, Sharlto Copley, Iyana Halley, and Leah Sava Jeffries joined the cast.

=== Filming ===
Filming commenced on June 1, 2021, in South Africa and lasted for 10 weeks. Filming locations included Cape Town, Limpopo, and the Orange River.

=== Music ===
Steven Price composed the film score. Back Lot Music has released the soundtrack.

==== Track listing ====
No.	Title	Length
1.	"Beast"	2:08
2.	"One Got Away"	2:50
3.	"The Amahle Tree"	1:28
4.	"I Wasn't Home"	0:58
5.	"Ready for Safari"	1:13
6.	"The Only Law That Matters"	2:39
7.	"The Fire Is Still Hot"	4:44
8.	"Is Anybody Still Alive?"	2:55
9.	"To The Water"	2:18
10.	"Stay in the Car"	3:23
11.	"In His Territory Now"	3:25
12.	"You Have One Shot"	6:12
13.	"That Thing Is a Beast"	1:18
14.	"Amahle Would Be Proud of You"	3:47
15.	"A Very Dangerous Place"	3:39
16.	"Ten Minutes"	3:08
17.	"Come Back Please Dad"	4:17
18.	"Sorry Boy"	2:47
19.	"There's Got to Be Something"	2:39
20.	"Trust Me"	2:49
21.	"The Beast"	2:53
22.	"Everything's Going to Be OK"	1:00
23.	"Into The Pridelands"	1:44
24.	"I Missed All the Signs"	4:12
25.	"Coda"	0:59
26.	"N'na Duniyaa (Sona Jobarteh)"	4:45
Total length:		74:08

== Release ==
=== Theatrical ===
Beast was released on August 19, 2022, by Universal Pictures.

=== Home media ===
The film was released on VOD on September 8, 2022, followed by a Blu-ray and DVD release on October 11, 2022. It was released on Peacock on October 7, 2022.

== Reception ==
=== Box office ===
Beast grossed $31.8 million in the United States and Canada, and $27.3 million in other territories, for a worldwide total of $59.1 million, against a production budget of $36 million.

In North America, Beast was released alongside Dragon Ball Super: Super Hero, and was projected to gross around $10 million from 3,743 theaters in its opening weekend. The film made $4.3 million on its first day, including $925,000 from Thursday night previews. It went on to debut at $11.6 million, finishing second behind Super Hero. The largest demographic was African-American at 34%, followed by 26% Caucasian, 23% Hispanic, and 10% Asian. Nearly half the opening weekend audience was over 35 years old, and a third was over 45. In its second weekend, the film made $4.9 million, finishing third.

=== Critical response ===
On review aggregator Rotten Tomatoes, 68% of 208 reviews are positive, with an average rating of 6/10. The site's critics consensus reads, "Want to watch Idris Elba fight a lion? The admirably lean yet ultimately disposable Beast is just the movie you're looking for." Metacritic gave the film a weighted average score of 54 out of 100, based on 46 critics, indicating "mixed or average" reviews. Audiences polled by CinemaScore gave the film an average grade of "B" on an A+ to F scale, while PostTrak gave the film a 65% overall positive score, with 46% saying they would definitely recommend it.

Several critics singled praise for cinematographer Philippe Rousselot. Wenlei Ma writing for news.com.au commended the film's focus: "it's a chase film and what you get is a suspenseful chase. Job done." Critic Dwight Brown wrote: "The success of this film's eye-catching, ear-grabbing hocus pocus can be traced back to smart direction, near seamless visual/sound effects, tight editing and the supremely talented Idris Elba."

Odie Henderson of RogerEbert.com, gave it 2.5 out of 4 and compared the film to its contemporary, Prey (2022): "both have messages about hunters ravaging the animal kingdom and paying dearly for it [...]. The climactic showdown in both films boils down to the hero using what they know about their location and their foe, though this film requires a lot more suspension of disbelief." Richard Roeper called it "intermittently exciting but also quite dumb and ridiculous".

=== Accolades ===
The film was nominated for Outstanding Animated Character in a Photoreal Feature at the 21st Visual Effects Society Awards. It was also nominated for Outstanding Achievement in Effects in a Live Action Production at the 50th Annie Awards.

== See also ==
- The Ghost and the Darkness (1996), an American historical adventure film
- Prey (2007), a South African thriller film
- Rogue (2020), an American action thriller film
