= Angel (2023 TV series) =

- Genre: Crime drama
- Created by: Yolanda Halley
- Written by: Manny Halley, Siergio Michael
- Directed by: Yolanda Halley, Jamal Hill, David Wolfgang
- Starring: Efrangeliz Medina; Elise Neal; Iyana Halley; Michele "Siya" Sherman; Lana "MC Lyte" Moorer; Malcolm David Kelley; Alex West
- Country of origin: United States
- Original language: English
- No. of seasons: 1
- No. of episodes: 3

Production
- Executive producer: Manny Halley
- Producers: Yolanda Halley, Manny Halley, Rodney Turner II
- Production company: Imani Entertainment

Original release
- Network: BET+
- Release: January 5, 2023 – present

Related
- Dutch

Angel is a TV series (originally a miniseries) streamed on BET+. It premiered in January 2023. The show functions as a prequel to the 2021 feature film Dutch, based on Teri Woods' 2003 novel. It stars Efrangeliz Medina, Elise Neal, Iyana Halley, Michele ‘Siya’ Sherman, Lana ‘MC Lyte’ Moorer, Ej King, Manny World, Jadah Blue, Nize, Jeremy Weaver,Alex West as Montez and Malcolm David Kelley as Dutch. The miniseries was produced by Imani Films.

In 2024, it was announced that the show would become a series with a full season.

== Premise ==
Angel Alvarez (Efrangeliz Medina) escapes foster care with other foster girls. To survive, she turns to a life of crime.

== Cast of characters ==
- Efrangeliz Medina as Angel
  - Kaya Jackson as Young Angel
- Elise Neal as Teresa
- Iyana Halley as Sheree, Angel's foster sister
- Malcolm David Kelley as Dutch
- Michele ‘Siya’ Sherman as Diamond, a gangster and mentor to Angel
- Lana ‘MC Lyte’ Moorer as Detective Monroe
- Jeremy Miller as Detective Holt
- Richard T. Jones as McCoy, Angel's attorney
- Ej King as Ms. Toni
- Jadah Blue as Dakiya
- Jeremy Weaver as Craze
- Alex West as Montez
