= Peter and the Starcatcher =

Play written by Rick Elice

- Broadway Logo
- Written by: Rick Elice
- Characters: Peter Pan; Molly Aster; Black Stache
- Subject: Peter and the Starcatcher

Premiere
- Date: February 13, 2009
- Place: La Jolla Playhouse

Peter and the Starcatcher is a play based on the 2004 novel Peter and the Starcatchers by Dave Barry and Ridley Pearson, adapted for the stage by Rick Elice. The play provides a backstory for the characters of Peter Pan, Mrs Darling, Tinker Bell and Hook, and serves as a prequel to J. M. Barrie's Peter and Wendy. After a premiere in California at the La Jolla Playhouse, the play transferred to Off-Broadway in 2011 and opened on Broadway on April 15, 2012. The show ended its Broadway run on January 20, 2013, and reopened Off-Broadway once again at New World Stages in March 2013, ending in January 2014.

== Plot ==
=== Act I ===
At a bustling port in England, two ships set sail for the kingdom of Rundoon. The Wasp carries Lord Leonard Aster, escorted by a squadron of British navy seamen, led by Lieutenant Greggors. The Neverland, captained by the sinister Bill Slank, carries Lord Aster's daughter Molly, her nanny, Mrs. Bumbrake and three orphan boys: Prentiss, Ted, and a nameless orphan known only as Boy. Each ship has a trunk aboard, one containing precious cargo belonging to the Queen and the other a decoy. After realizing that no one cares enough to say goodbye to the orphans, the Boy proclaims that he hates grownups.

Aster places an amulet around his own neck and a matching one around Molly's. He warns her never to take it off or let anyone else touch it, and to use it if she is ever in trouble. Molly says that she is only an apprentice Starcatcher.

Once at sea, Lieutenant Greggors reveals that his real name is Smee and the seamen are pirates. Captain Scott and the real seamen have been taken prisoner. Smee introduces Captain Black Stache, who threatens to kill Molly unless Aster gives him the key to the trunk. When Aster refuses, he steals the trunk key. The amulet around Lord Aster’s neck begins to glow. Molly’s matching amulet starts to glow and the boys notice. Molly divulges that her father is on a secret mission for the Queen. It is revealed that Slank swapped the trunks and the Queen's treasure is on board The Neverland. Stache commands that the ship be turned around. The Wasp pursues The Neverland.

Lord Aster contacts Molly through the amulet and instructs her to bring the Queen’s trunk to him once the two ships meet. Aster tells Molly that she is now a part of the mission. The Boy overhears and insists that Molly tell him what is going on. Molly tells the Boy about Starcatchers, a handful of people whose sole mission is to protect "starstuff." Molly explains that a Starcatcher’s primary duty to collect starstuff as it falls to earth and dispose of it. Slank catches the Boy and throws him overboard. The Boy starts to drown and Molly saves him.

When the two ships meet, Molly asks the Boy to stall the pirates while she gets the Queen’s trunk to The Wasp, and the Boy sits on the decoy trunk to “protect the treasure”. Stache tries to lure the Boy off the trunk by offering him a place on his crew. Stache suggests some piratical names for him. One of them, ‘Pirate Pete’, strikes a chord with the Boy and he chooses a name for himself: ‘Peter’. Losing patience, Stache knocks Peter off the trunk, opens it, and realizes he has been tricked. As Peter celebrates his own cleverness, Stache knocks him overboard. Molly dives into the ocean and swims after Peter.

=== Act II ===
Atop a mountain on the island, Peter absorbs the freedom of open skies and clean air for the first time in his life. A yellow bird flies around his head. Ted and Prentiss arrive, and Peter enlists them in the mission to get the trunk to The Wasp.

The island’s natives, the Mollusks, capture the boys. The chief, Fighting Prawn, sentences them to death. They are to be sacrificed and fed to Mr. Grin, the island’s hungriest crocodile. Trapped inside Mr. Grin’s cage, Molly and the boys bicker about what to do. Peter gets Mr. Grin to open his mouth and Molly tosses her amulet in. Mr. Grin grows to an enormous size, bursting out of the cage and floating away as Molly and the boys flee. The Mollusks are furious and pursue them. Peter falls into a lake, where he is greeted by the mermaid who calls herself ‘Teacher’. Teacher and the island give Peter a second name: ‘Pan’. Peter climbs out of the grotto and bolts back up to the mountaintop.

The next morning, Smee and Stache try to lure the children into the open. Smee reveals he has taken Mrs. Bumbrake and Alf prisoner. The Mollusks enter with prisoners of their own — Lord Aster and Captain Scott. Mrs. Bumbrake recognizes Fighting Prawn as her long-lost kitchen boy from Brighton. A fight ensues, ending with Stache threatening Molly's life. Peter relents and gives Stache the trunk, even if it means never leaving the island. However, Stache opens the lid to discover the trunk empty, due to water that seeped inside dissolving the starstuff, which has diffused into the ocean, meaning the entire group's efforts were for nothing. A frustrated Stache slams the lid shut, only to accidentally cut off his own hand in the process. Delirious from pain, Stache blames Peter for his troubles and vows to be his foe for all eternity. Hearing Mr. Grin approaching, the Pirates leave to feed Stache’s severed hand to the crocodile. Fighting Prawn honors Peter as a true hero and allows the English to leave.

Lord Aster makes Molly a full-fledged Starcatcher. Peter mentions his encounter with Teacher. They realize that Peter, by being dunked in the starstuff-infused waters of the grotto, has been transformed and cannot leave the island. Lord Aster captures the yellow bird and turns it into a pixie to protect and guide Peter. As The Wasp sails away, Peter settles into the eternal present of childhood.

== Cast of Characters ==
- Boy: A nameless and friendless 13 year-old orphan, deeply mistrustful of adults and neglected to the point of never having seen the sun. His adventures allow him to find the hero within himself, and to take on a name worthy of the legend he becomes.
- Molly Aster: A 13 year-old apprentice Starcatcher desperate to prove herself to her father. Highly intelligent and physically adept, she remains socially awkward and something of a know-it-all, and her relationship with the orphan boys is driven as much by competition as it is by friendship.
- Black Stache: A highly intelligent but malapropism-prone pirate chief, so called due to the black mustache that is a trademark in his family. In search of a great hero who he can oppose to become a great villain, Stache is given to scenery chewing and anachronistic jokes, and has a hook in his future. The name ‘Black Stache’ is a reference to the pirate Blackbeard.
- Prentiss: One of the Boy’s orphan companions. Pompous and sarcastic, he is intent on proclaiming himself the leader of the gang of Orphans but is too cowardly to really do anything about it, and usually follows Peter and Molly with only nominal protest.
- Ted: One of the Boy’s orphan companions, nicknamed ‘Tubby Ted’. Constantly hungry, he is obsessed with food and faints at the mere mention of sticky pudding. He accepts Molly as a mother figure immediately, often referring to her by that title. Once on the Island, he spends most of his time attempting to figure out how to eat a pineapple.
- Smee: Black Stache’s faithful first mate. More intelligent than he gives himself credit for (but still not overly bright), Smee is willing to follow his captain in any amount of hare-brained schemes. Somehow, this ends up with him disguising himself as a Mermaid, which is far from a pretty sight.
- Lord Leonard Aster: Molly’s father, A Starcatcher on a secret mission for Queen Victoria. He loves his daughter dearly but is perhaps guilty of placing his mission above her safety. Constantly paranoid about the security of top-secret conversation, he has trained Molly to converse in Dodo, Porpoise, and Norse code (a Morse code-like system used by ancient Vikings).
- Fighting Prawn: The fierce chief of the tribe of Mollusk Islanders, who was sold into slavery in England as a boy, where he became a kitchen slave in a fine house. He speaks almost exclusively in Italian cooking terms. The actor in this role also portrays Grempkin, the sadistic schoolmaster of St. Norbert’s Orphanage for Lost Boys, Sanchez, one of Black Stache’s crew, and Mack, the world’s most incompetent Sailor.
- Mrs. Bumbrake: Molly’s faithful nanny, a prim and proper Englishwoman prone to alliteration. In the tradition of the pantomime dame, the role is written to be portrayed by a male actor, who also plays Teacher a wise and mysterious mermaid.
- Alf: A salty and flatulent sailor on The Neverland, who falls deeply and instantly in love with Mrs. Bumbrake. He is good-natured, but somewhat coarse and has no time for children.
- Bill Slank: The nasty, greedy, and cruel captain of The Neverland. It is Slank’s greed for the Queen’s secret treasure that sets the entire plot in motion. The actor in the role also portrays Hawking Clam, Fighting Prawn’s son.
- Captain Robert Falcon Scott: Captain of The Wasp, and Lord Aster’s old friend from their schooldays, based loosely on the real Robert Falcon Scott.
- The ensemble cast portrays narrators, mermaids, pirates, sailors, islanders, and various other creatures, locations, and people throughout the show.

== Productions ==
The play premiered at the La Jolla Playhouse in California, running from February 13 to March 8, 2009. It was co-directed by playwright Rick Elice's partner Roger Rees and Alex Timbers. An instrumental score was written by Wayne Barker. The cast starred Adam Green as Peter Pan.

The play, now titled Peter and the Starcatcher, opened Off-Broadway at New York Theatre Workshop, beginning performances on February 18, 2011. The show received several extensions, eventually closing on April 24, 2011. The new cast starred Celia Keenan-Bolger as Molly, Christian Borle as Black Stache, and Adam Chanler-Berat as Peter. From mid-March through April 1, Borle shared the role of Black Stache with Steve Rosen. Chanler-Berat shared the role of Peter with Jason Ralph.

The show then opened on Broadway at the Brooks Atkinson Theatre, with previews starting on March 28, 2012 and officially opening on April 15, 2012. The original Broadway cast included Christian Borle (Black Stache), Celia Keenan-Bolger (Molly), Adam Chanler-Berat (Boy), Teddy Bergman (Fighting Prawn), Arnie Burton (Mrs. Bumbrake), Matt D’Amico (Slank), Kevin Del Aguila (Smee), Carson Elrod (Prentiss), Greg Hildreth (Alf), Rick Holmes (Lord Aster), Isaiah Johnson (Captain Scott) and David Rossmer (Ted). Art for the Broadway production, which draws upon the whimsical, imaginative content in the show, was crafted by Vermont-based woodworker John W. Long, and featured in The New York Times. On July 2, 2012, Matthew Saldivar replaced Borle in the role of Black Stache. The Broadway production of Peter and the Starcatcher closed on January 20, 2013 after 18 previews and 319 regular performances.

The show re-opened Off-Broadway at New World Stages beginning on March 18, 2013. It closed on January 12, 2014.

A national tour launched in Denver on August 15, 2013 and concluded in Pittsburgh on May 25, 2014. A second national tour launched in Toledo on February 5, 2015 and concluded in Burlington, VT on April 14, 2015.

An Australian production of the play, produced by Dead Puppet Society, opened at the Canberra Theatre Centre on 15 October 2024, before touring to Melbourne, Sydney and Brisbane. It featured Colin Lane as Black Stache, Peter Helliar as Smee, Otis Dhanji as Boy and Olivia Deeble as Molly, and was directed by David Morton, with additional music by James Dobinson and movement direction by Liesel Zink.

The play is available for licensing from Music Theatre International.

== Original casts ==
Character	World Premiere La Jolla Playhouse (2009)	Off-Broadway New York Theatre Workshop (2011)	Broadway Brooks Atkinson Theatre (2011)	Off-Broadway New World Stages (2012)	US tour (2013)	Australian tour (2024)
Black Stache	Christian Borle	Christian Borle	Christian Borle	Rick Holmes	John Sanders	Colin Lane
Molly	Celia Keenan-Bolger	Celia Keenan-Bolger	Celia Keenan-Bolger	Nicole Lowrance	Megan Stern	Olivia Deeble
Boy	Adam Green	Adam Chanler-Berat	Adam Chanler-Berat	Jason Ralph	Joey deBettencourt	Otis Dhanji
Grempkin Mack Sȧnchez Fighting Prawn	Teddy Bergman	Teddy Bergman	Teddy Bergman	Josh Grisetti	Lee Zarrett	Ryan Gonzalez
Mrs. Bumbrake Teacher	Maggie Carney	Arnie Burton	Arnie Burton	Jon Patrick Walker	Benjamin Schrader	Lucy Goleby
Slank Hawking Clam	Andrew McGinn / Jared Dagar	Matt D'Amico	Matt D'Amico	Matt D'Amico	Jimonn Cole	Paul Capsis
Smee	Ron Choularton	Kevin Del Aguila	Kevin Del Aguila	Kevin Del Aguila	Luke Smith	Peter Helliar
Prentiss	Carson Elrod	Carson Elrod	Carson Elrod	Andrew Mueller	Carl Howell	Morgan Francis
Alf	Greg Hildreth	Greg Hildreth	Greg Hildreth	Evan Harrington	Harter Clingman	John Batchelor
Lord Aster	John G. Preston	Karl Kenzler	Rick Holmes	Edward Baker-Duly	Nathan Hosner	Alison Whyte
Captain Scott	Charlie Reuter	Brandon J. Dirden	Isaiah Johnson	Alex Hernandez	Ian Michael Stuart	Hugh Parker
Ted	David Rossmer	David Rossmer	David Rossmer	Nate Miller	Edward Tournier	Benjin Maza
Sailor / Pirate	—N/a	Eric William Love	—N/a	—N/a	—N/a	—N/a
Ammm	Irungu Mutu	—N/a	—N/a	—N/a	—N/a	—N/a
Jim	Kevin Johnston	—N/a	—N/a	—N/a	—N/a	—N/a

== Critical response ==
Although the show garnered positive-to-mixed reviews by most critics, it received a rave review from The New York Times, with Ben Brantley writing:

"When the H.M.S. Neverland goes down in Peter and the Starcatcher, it's the most enthralling shipwreck since James Cameron sent the Titanic to her watery grave in the late 1990s ... The cast is, with no exceptions, wonderful ... It's a performance that you might classify as 'over the top', but only in the sense that the entire production is. With grown-up theatrical savvy and a child's wonder at what it can achieve, Peter and the Starcatcher floats right through the ceiling of the physical limits imposed by a three-dimensional stage. While there's not a body harness in sight, like those used to hoist the title characters of Mary Poppins and Spider-Man, this show never stops flying."

== Awards and nominations ==
=== Original Off-Broadway production ===
Year	Award	Category	Nominee	Result
2011	Lucille Lortel Awards	Outstanding Play		Nominated
2011	Lucille Lortel Awards	Outstanding Choreographer	Steven Hoggett	Won
2011	Lucille Lortel Awards	Outstanding Lead Actor	Christian Borle	Won
2011	Lucille Lortel Awards	Outstanding Scenic Design	Donyale Werle	Won
2011	Off Broadway Alliance Awards	Best New Play		Nominated
2011	Drama Desk Awards	Outstanding Featured Actor in a Play	Christian Borle	Nominated
2011	Drama Desk Awards	Outstanding Featured Actress in a Play	Celia Keenan-Bolger	Nominated
2011	Drama Desk Awards	Outstanding Choreography	Steven Hoggett	Nominated
2011	Drama Desk Awards	Outstanding Music in a Play	Wayne Barker	Won
2011	Drama Desk Awards	Outstanding Costume Design	Paloma Young	Nominated
2011	Tina Awards	The Best Of Off-Broadway (Play)		Nominated
2011	Tina Awards	Best Ensemble (Play)		Nominated
2011	Tina Awards	Best Actor (Play)	Christian Borle	Nominated
2011	Tina Awards	Best Director	Roger Rees and Alex Timbers	Nominated
2011	Tina Awards	Best Choreographer	Steven Hogget	Nominated
2011	Tina Awards	Best Scenic Design	Donyale Werle	Nominated
2011	Tina Awards	Best Lighting Design	Jeff Croiter	Nominated
2011	Tina Awards	Best Sound Design	Darron L. West	Won
2011	Tina Awards	Best Costume Design	Paloma Young	Nominated
2011	Obie Awards	Best Director	Roger Rees and Alex Timbers	Won

=== Original Broadway production ===
Year	Award	Category	Nominee	Result
2012	Tony Awards	Best Play		Nominated
2012	Tony Awards	Best Direction of a Play	Roger Rees and Alex Timbers	Nominated
2012	Tony Awards	Best Performance by a Featured Actor in a Play	Christian Borle	Won
2012	Tony Awards	Best Performance by a Featured Actress in a Play	Celia Keenan-Bolger	Nominated
2012	Tony Awards	Best Sound Design of a Play	Darron L. West	Won
2012	Tony Awards	Best Lighting Design of a Play	Jeff Croiter	Won
2012	Tony Awards	Best Costume Design of a Play	Paloma Young	Won
2012	Tony Awards	Best Scenic Design of a Play	Donyale Werle	Won
2012	Tony Awards	Best Original Score	Wayne Barker and Rick Elice	Nominated
2012	Broadway.com Audience Choice Awards	Favorite Play		Won
2012	Broadway.com Audience Choice Awards	Favorite Actress	Celia Keenan-Bolger	Won
2012	Broadway.com Audience Choice Awards	Favorite Funny Performance	Christian Borle	Won
