= Iyana Halley =

American actress (born 1993)

- Born: January 27, 1993 (age 33); Brooklyn, New York City, New York, U.S
- Occupation: Actress
- Years active: 2013–present

Iyana Halley (born January 27, 1993) is an American actress. She appeared in films True to the Game (2017) and its sequels, If Not Now, When? (2019), Dutch (2021), Licorice Pizza (2021) and Beast (2022).

== Early life, family and education ==
Halley was born and raised in Brooklyn, New York City.

== Career ==
Halley's career began with appearances in television series Justice for All with Judge Cristina Perez, Tosh.0, Family Time and The Mayor. She made her big screen debut in the drama film True to the Game (2017) and later reprised her role in its sequels (2020 and 2021). In 2018 she was featured in the final episode of HBO miniseries Sharp Objects and later co-starred in the drama film If Not Now, When?. In 2019 she appeared in the miniseries I Am the Night and starred in an episode of HBO anthology series, Room 104. She also appeared in films The Hate U Give (2018), Nineteen Summers (2019), Dutch (2021), Between Forever (2021) and Licorice Pizza (2021).

In 2022, Halley played the leading role in the thriller film Wayward, and starred with Idris Elba in the survival action horror film Beast. It received mixed-to-positive reviews from critics and bombed at the box office.

On television, she had recurring role in the NBC drama This Is Us and guest-starred in two episodes on ABC comedy series Abbott Elementary as the daughter of Sheryl Lee Ralph's character. In 2022, she guest-starred on Law & Order: Special Victims Unit and later had recurring roles on Good Trouble and All American: Homecoming. In 2023, she starred in the BET+ miniseries, Angel, and she starred opposite Garcelle Beauvais in the Lifetime television film Black Girl Missing in the title role. In 2024 she starred in the thriller film One Night Stay.

== Filmography ==
=== Film ===
Year	Title	Role	Notes
2017	Sins of the Father	Casey	Short
2017	True to the Game	Bria	
2018	The Hate U Give	Bianca	
2019	Skin in the Game	Runway	
2019	Best of Life	Hope Best	Short
2019	Nineteen Summers	Young Porsha	
2019	If Not Now, When?	Teenage Patrice	
2020	Numb	Tiana	Short
2020	Gone	Alli	Short
2020	True to the Game 2	Bria	
2021	Black Prom	Dahlia	Short
2021	Dutch	Sam	
2021	Between Forever	Gigi	
2021	Real Talk	Theresa	
2021	Licorice Pizza	Brenda	
2021	True to the Game 3	Bria	
2022	Wayward	Dawn	
2022	Beast	Meredith Samuels	
2023	Black Girl Missing	Lauren	
2023	Rock the Boat	Sommer	
2024	One Night Stay	Jessica	
2024	Rock the Boat 2	Sommer	
2025	Aftershock: The Nicole P Bell Story	Tila	Post-production

=== Television ===
Year	Legacy	Role	Notes
2013	Justice for All with Judge Cristina Perez	Patty Holt	Episode: "A Work of Heart/Your Juice Stained My Opportunity"
2015	Tosh.0	Teenage Girl	Episode: "Fedora Hero Saves Eggs"
2016	Una Palabra	Amber	Episode: "Amber Odom"
2017	Family Time	Young Regina	Episode: "Let Cheatin' Dogs Lie"
2017	The Mayor	Tina	Episode: "Will You Accept This Rose?"
2018	Sharp Objects	Mae	Episode: "Milk"
2019	I Am the Night	Sharon	Episode: "Pilot"
2019	Game Shakers	Giggling Girl #2	Episode: "Bug Tussle"
2019	Room 104	Zohara	Episode: "Rogue"
2021	On My Block	Aaliyah	Episode: "Chapter Thirty"
2021	Partners in Rhyme	Chloe	Episode: "PregNOT"
2021–22	This Is Us	Adult Annie	Guest: Season 1, Recurring Cast: Season 2
2021–23	Good Trouble	Kendy	Recurring Cast: Season 3, Guest: Season 4-5
2022–23	All American: Homecoming	Wilinda	Recurring Cast: Season 1-2
2022–24	Abbott Elementary	Taylor Howard	Recurring Cast: Season 1, Guest: Season 3
2023	Angel	Sheree	Recurring Cast
2023	Black Girl Missing	Lauren	Television film

=== Music Videos ===
Year	Song	Artist
2016	"Switching Lanes"	T.I. featuring Big K.R.I.T. & Trev Case
2018	"Boblo Boat"	Royce da 5′9″ featuring J. Cole
