= Ernestine Johnson Morrison =

American actress, producer, and poet

- Born: Ernestine Johnson
- Occupations: Actress; producer; poet
- Years active: 2001–present
- Spouse: Jay Morrison (m. 2018)
- Children: 1

Ernestine Johnson Morrison is an American actress, producer and poet.

== Filmography ==
=== Film ===
Year	Title	Role	Notes
2001	Love the Hard Way	Jack's Neighbour	
2012	Sugar Mommas	Kendra	TV movie
2012	Reckless	Lisa Daniels	Short
2014	Where's the Love?	Tristan	
2014	Think Like a Man Too	Pool Waitress	
2014	Hear No Evil	Brian's Mom	
2016	Ladies Book Club	Female Friend	TV movie
2016	DigitalLivesMatter	Erica	
2017	Dirty South House Arrest	Jalissa	
2017	Downsized	Tisha	
2017	Poorly Rich	Farrah	Short
2018	The Mothers	Campaign Manager	Short
2018	The Morning After: Part One	Ashleigh	
2018	Daddy's Home	Stephanie Mayfield	Short
2019	Bro, I Shrunk My Sidechick!	Bria	Short
2019	Angrily Ever After	Brianna	
2020	Open	Zoey Taylor	TV movie
2022	Scheme Queens	Audra	
2022	Boxed In	Lori	
2023	Freeman Hospitality	Joy	Short
2023	Love & Murder: Atlanta Playboy	Delyse	
2024	The Geechee Witch: A Boo Hag Story	Dr. Zoe Quade	

=== Television ===
Year	Title	Role	Notes
2016	Cream X Coffee	Female Officer	Episode: "Absence of Light"
2017	24: Legacy	Lisa	Episode: "10:00 p.m.-11:00 p.m."
2017	Shots Fired	Reporter #2	Episode: "Hour Nine: Come to Jesus"
2018	The Quad	Herself	Episode: "#InLoveAndTrouble"
2019	Broad City	Nikki	Episode: "Stories"
2019	Last Call	Naima	Episode: "Misconceptions"
2019	Ambitions	Woman Cop	Episode: "Reap What You Sew"
2019	BET Her Presents: The Waiting Room	Devon	Episode: "The Waiting Room"
2021	Queen Sugar	Power Broker #1	Episode: "And Dream with Them Deeply"
2022	Johnson	Sade	Episode: "Altar Call"
2023	The Company You Keep	Taraji Selassie	Episode: "Company Man"
2024	Genius	Annie	Episode: "The American Promise"
2024	Ruthless	Alex	Recurring Cast: Season 4
2025	Beyond the Gates	Shanice Johnson	Regular Cast
