= The Brothers (2001 film) =

2001 romantic comedy drama film by Gary Hardwick

- Theatrical release poster
- Directed by: Gary Hardwick
- Written by: Gary Hardwick
- Produced by: Doug McHenry; Darin Scott
- Starring: Morris Chestnut; D. L. Hughley; Bill Bellamy; Shemar Moore; Tamala Jones; Gabrielle Union
- Cinematography: Alexander Gruszynski
- Edited by: Earl Watson
- Music by: Marcus Miller
- Production companies: Screen Gems; Bro-Boyz Productions, Inc.
- Distributed by: Sony Pictures Releasing
- Release date: March 23, 2001
- Running time: 102 minutes
- Country: United States
- Language: English
- Budget: $6 million
- Box office: $27.9 million

The Brothers is a 2001 romantic comedy drama film starring Morris Chestnut, D. L. Hughley, Bill Bellamy, and Shemar Moore. The film was written and directed by Gary Hardwick, who has directed other films and television series such as Deliver Us from Eva and Hangin' with Mr. Cooper. Gabrielle Union, Tatyana Ali, Jenifer Lewis, Tamala Jones, and Clifton Powell also star in the film's ensemble cast. Dubbed as the male version of the 1995 film Waiting to Exhale, this film traces the journey of four African-American men as they take on love, sex, friendship, honesty and commitment.

The film was released in March 2001 and grossed nearly $28 million at the box office, which quintupled the movie's production cost of $6 million. It was nominated for NAACP Image Awards and Black Reel Awards.

== Plot ==
Jackson Smith, Brian Palmer, Derrick West and Terry White are lifelong friends since childhood. The film has separate subplots with each character, showing how their friendships binds them.

Jackson, a physician, struggles with commitment issues and often has nightmares with a bride. When working through his issues with a therapist, she suggests he meet a woman that night and "give his heart to her." He soon meets a beautiful freelance photographer who makes Jackson realize that he may be capable of true love and commitment. When he finds out that Denise once dated his father, his new outlook on love takes a turn.

Brian, an attorney, realizes that his chronic womanizing is catching up to him in ways he didn't imagine when a former lover (also the judge in a case he is currently working) sends him to jail. He makes a vow to not date African-American women because he believes that they carry unnecessary drama. Brian is working to gain custody of his younger brother who currently lives in a affection-less household with his mother.

Derrick, the only married member of the group, loves his wife and daughter, but is struggling with the idea of his wife not giving him the type of sex he desires. After many attempts to convince his wife that pleasing your partner is an important part of a successful marriage, he and his wife separate. In addition to wanting more in the bedroom, Derrick is trying to convince his wife to let his ailing mother live in their home.

Terry, a former womanizer who is tired of playing the field and ready to settle down, is preparing to marry his girlfriend of two months, Bebe, despite the warnings of his friends who feel that he is rushing into the commitment. As his wedding day fast approaches, he'll have to decide if he is truly ready to make the leap into the rest of his life.

== Cast ==
- Morris Chestnut as Jackson Smith
- D. L. Hughley as Derrick West
- Bill Bellamy as Brian Palmer
- Shemar Moore as Terry White
- Gabrielle Union as Denise Johnson
- Tamala Jones as Sheila West
- Tatyana Ali as Cherie Smith
- Jenifer Lewis as Louise Smith
- Clifton Powell as Fred Smith
- Susan Dalian as BeBe Fales
- Julie Benz as Jessie Caldwell
- Vanessa Bell Calloway as Dr. Thelma Woolridge
- Angelle Brooks as Judge Carla Williams
- Gary Hardwick as T-Boy
- Nadege August as Ursula

== Soundtrack ==
The Brothers - Music From The Motion Picture

Soundtrack album by Various artists
- Released: March 20, 2001
- Recorded: 2000–2001
- Genres: Hip hop, R&B
- Length: 71:03
- Label: Warner Bros.
- Producers: Alison Ball-Gabriel (exec.); Doug McHenry (exec.); Gary Hardwick (exec.); Pilar McCurry (exec.)

Singles from The Brothers - Music From The Motion Picture
- 1. "Love Don't Love Me" Released: March 13, 2001

Professional ratings
Review scores
| Source | Rating |
|---|---|
| Allmusic | 3/5 stars |

The film's soundtrack album was released on March 20, 2001 by Warner Bros. Records and features songs recorded by various hip hop and R&B recording artists.

=== Track listing ===
The Brothers: Music from the Motion Picture
| No. | Title | Performer(s) | Length |
|---|---|---|---|
| 1. | "Love Don't Love Me" | Eric Benét | 4:35 |
| 2. | "Lay It Down" | Jermaine Dupri & R.O.C. featuring Lil' Mo | 3:27 |
| 3. | "Good Love" | RL | 4:08 |
| 4. | "Let It Go" | Jaheim featuring Castro | 2:46 |
| 5. | "Two of a Kind" | Eddie Levert featuring Gerald Levert | 4:51 |
| 6. | "Hi 2 U" | Snoop Dogg | 5:25 |
| 7. | "Josephine" | DL | 4:54 |
| 8. | "2Night" | Somethin' for the People | 4:06 |
| 9. | "Teach Each Other" | Maze featuring Frankie Beverly | 7:24 |
| 10. | "Wheel of Fortune" | Lil' Johnny | 4:09 |
| 11. | "I'm Through" | Cassie Bonner | 5:14 |
| 12. | "I Put It Down" | Duganz | 3:34 |
| 13. | "Happy" | AB and Zu | 4:24 |
| 14. | "Forever" | Dave Hollister | 4:35 |
| 15. | "No Question" | Remember Us | 5:00 |
| 16. | "The Love Theme" | Marcus Miller | 3:06 |

=== Weekly charts ===
| Chart (2001) | Peak position |
|---|---|
| US Billboard 200 | 32 |
| US Top R&B/Hip-Hop Albums (Billboard) | 9 |

== Reception ==
=== Box office ===
The film opened second at the North American box office making $10.3 million USD in its opening weekend.

== Critical response ==
Entertainment Weekly's Owen Gleiberman gave the film a B+ grade and wrote, "These ardent, mostly single-guy romantics deeply love women but stumble the moment they try to figure out how to love them. Written and directed by Gary Hardwick, The Brothers is filled with the sort of just-try-and-top-this-sucker dialogue that leaves an audience hooting with delight, yet it digs more vibrantly into issues of trust, pleasure, commitment, and camaraderie than any Hollywood feature in recent memory." Roger Ebert gave the film 3 out of 4 stars and particularly praised the scenes with Chestnut and Union.

On review aggregate website Rotten Tomatoes, The Brothers has an approval rating of 64% based on 67 critics' reviews, with an average rating of 5.8/10. The website's critics consensus reads, "Often seen as a Waiting to Exhale with men, The Brothers is amiable. However, it feels superficial and somewhat of a retread." Metacritic, which uses a weighted average, assigned the film a score of 50 out of 100, based on 23 critics, indicating "mixed or average" reviews.

== Awards and nominations ==
- NAACP Image Awards
  - Outstanding Motion Picture (nominated)
- Black Reel Awards
  - Theatrical- Best Director (nominated): Gary Hardwick
  - Theatrical- Best Screenplay (nominated): Gary Hardwick
  - Theatrical- Best Supporting Actress (nominated): Gabrielle Union
