= Bound to Vengeance =

- Theatrical film poster
- Directed by: José Manuel Cravioto
- Written by: Rock Shaink Jr. Keith Kjornes
- Produced by: Daniel Posada; Alex Garcia; Rodolfo Marquez
- Starring: Richard Tyson; Bianca Malinowski; Kristoffer Kjornes; Dustin Quick; Stephanie Charles
- Cinematography: Byron Werner
- Edited by: Jorge Macaya
- Music by: Simon Boswell
- Production companies: Dark Factory Entertainment; Itaca Films
- Distributed by: Broadmedia Studios (Japan); Notorious Pictures (Italy); IFC Midnight and Scream Factory (USA); Monster Pictures (Australia)
- Release dates: 23 January 2015 (Sundance Film Festival); 26 June 2015
- Running time: 93 minutes
- Country: United States
- Language: English

Bound to Vengeance is a 2015 American horror-thriller film about a woman who escapes her confinement in a basement by a sexual predator. The film had its world premiere on January 23, 2015 at the Sundance Film Festival.

== Plot ==
The film begins with a man driving his van to an abandoned house in a remote area. He cooks a meal and brings it to the basement, where a girl is being held captive, with her leg chained to the floor. Without him noticing, she pulls out a brick and hits him violently on the head. She searches for the keys, unlocks the chain holding her leg and uses it to chain his leg.

She rushes out of the house, just to find out she's completely stranded in the middle of nowhere, with no one to ask for help. She can't start the van because she doesn't have the van keys. After finding a phone inside the house, she tries to call the police, but it doesn't work. While searching for the van keys, she discovers a revolver and a folder containing photos of some girls, along with their names (even her own photo). She quickly learns that she's not the only victim of the man (Phil).

She takes a bath, puts on Phil's clothes before getting back to the basement. She holds the revolver at Phil, asking him where the other girls are. He dares her to kill him, telling her that he's the only one that knows their whereabouts; if she kills him, she will kill them too (he informs her that there are 4 other girls in total). He also makes a deal with her: he shows her the girls, she brings him to the hospital. She goes upstairs, makes a snare, puts it around his neck and leads him to the van, forcing him to take her to the closest victim: a black girl named Nina.

Eve finds Nina at the first house, but when she finishes unlocking the chain holding Nina's leg, she rushes out of the house in a hysterical fear - despite Eve's explanation that she's trying to help her. Nina trips over a water hose and falls onto a metal fence, which impales her neck and kills her.

Eve makes Phil drive to the next house, where she finds Laura - the second victim - in a room chained to the ceiling. He frees her, but right then, he tells Laura that Eve is about to take her place. Laura angrily beats Eve, giving him the chance to get the snare out of his neck. Eve shoots Laura dead in self-defense and shoots his leg before he can attack her. She beats him with a wooden bar before taking him to the van. He taunts her that she caused the death of those victims (Nina, Laura, and Dylan - another victim girl who appears in the flashback footage with Eve at an amusement park. It is later revealed that Dylan is Eve's sister; she was held captive in the same basement with Eve, and is now dead). She ties him up with duct tape and drives to the next house.

She gets in the house alone and finds Lea - the third victim - chained in a dark room. Right then, two men - one fat and one skinny - get in the house and go upstairs, ready to rape Lea. Eve recognizes the skinny one to be the rapist that sexually attacked her before. Eve shoots both of them, killing the fat guy immediately and leaving the skinny guy bleeding to death.

Lea accompanies Eve to the next location: an abandoned warehouse. They find some girls inside a locked room. They tell Eve and Lea that the kidnappers brought them there, they couldn't do anything but wait for those men to take them away. Eve leaves Lea at the warehouse, telling her to keep an eye on the girls and call the police. When she returns to the van, she finds Phil sitting in the front seat. He distracts her when a tall guy (presumably the captor of the girls in the warehouse) sneaks behind her, then grabs her and subdues her. When she wakes up, Phil is holding her tight, telling the tall guy to shoot her leg, like she did to him before. But at that very moment, Lea appears and hits the tall guy on the head with a spanner, killing him. Eve beats Phil for tricking her. Lea then stays at the warehouse when Eve goes with Phil to the final house.

She gets in the house to find no one but her boyfriend Ronnie (who also appears in the flashback footage with Eve and Dylan) sleeping on an armchair. Panic-stricken, she holds the revolver at him and interrogates him why he's there (because it's not his house), and why Phil knows his name (Phil keeps calling Ronnie's name on the way to the houses). He concocts a story that the police didn't help him to find Eve, and in the desperate attempt to look for her, he lost his job. He tries to calm her down, but she suddenly hears a noise at the closet and she takes him there. Eve spots the photos of the victim girls in a folder, but Ronnie again lies to her that on the way searching for her, he found and rescued many girls, except her. She orders him open the closet door and turn on the light. To her horror, she finds Katrina - the last victim - lying inside. Eve now realizes that her boyfriend and Phil are behind all of the kidnappings, including hers. In the van, Phil cuts the duct tape holding his hands, but before he can start the van to get away, he hears gunshots and sees the light flashing inside the house several times, suggesting that Eve shoots Ronnie dead. At that time, the police arrive at the warehouse and free all captive girls there, including Lea.

Eve leaves the house, shoots the van in a frenzy of rage, before telling Phil that they will go to the “final address”, where it turns out to be Phil's house (a flashback reveals that she asks Ronnie for Phil's address before finishing him off). Afraid that his wife and daughter may find out his true colors, he pleads with her not to go there, but this bears no fruit. She throws him in front of his house. His wife is terrified to find her husband severely beaten. She quickly brings him into the house, but before his daughter closes the door, a hand (Eve's hand) holds it open, implying that she comes back to exact her revenge on Phil. What really happened to him and his family remains unknown.

The movie ends with the satisfied Eve walking away, then standing on the street, with a cold and murderous look on her bloody face.

== Cast ==
- Richard Tyson as Phil
- Bianca Malinowski as Lea
- Kristoffer Kjornes as Ronnie (as Kris Kjornes)
- Dustin Quick as Laura
- Stephanie Charles as Nina

== Release ==
Bound to Vengeance had its world premiere at the Sundance Film Festival on January 23, 2015, and showed at the Imagine Film Festival, Berlin Fantasy Filmfest later that same year. On June 26, 2015 the film had a limited theatrical release in the United States prior to its release on home media on November 11 of the same year, also in the United States.

== Reception ==
Critical reception for Bound to Vengeance has been negative. On Rotten Tomatoes the film has an approval rating of 25% based on 12 reviews. On Metacritic, it has a score of 27 out of 100 based on reviews from 5 critics. Common criticism for the film centered upon its violence and story, which Slant Magazine felt "trivializes victim trauma by treating its main character's best-laid plans as punchline fodder." A reviewer for TheFrightFile.com commented that the movie "holds one's attention, but not one's faith, telling a story that simply has too many holes to buy into it.”

In contrast, Cinema Crazed gave a more favorable opinion and commented that the film would be polarizing, that it would be best appeal to a niche audience, and that it was an entertaining example of revenge exploitation cinema. Shock Till You Drop editor Chris Alexander wrote a mixed review, writing "I’m not sure if it’s a good film but it’s tight, taut, never dull and offers some nice deviations from the usual revenge programmer, enough that I certainly can recommend it as a fine bit of filthy time-wasting."
