= Florida Man (TV series) =

American television series

- Official release poster
- Genre: Crime; Comedy drama
- Created by: Donald Todd
- Directed by: Miguel Arteta; Haifaa Al-Mansour; Julian Farino; Clark Gregg
- Starring: Édgar Ramírez; Abbey Lee; Otmara Marrero; Lex Scott Davis; Emory Cohen; Isaiah Johnson; Anthony LaPaglia
- Country of origin: United States
- Original language: English
- No. of episodes: 7

Production
- Executive producers: Donald Todd; Jason Bateman; Michael Costigan; Miguel Arteta; Nikki Toscano
- Cinematography: Adrian Peng Correia, Wes Cardino
- Running time: 50–54 minutes
- Production companies: Donald Todd Productions; Aggregate Films

Original release
- Network: Netflix
- Release: April 13, 2023

Florida Man is an American crime drama television limited series created by Donald Todd, who serves as an executive producer alongside Jason Bateman, Michael Costigan, and Miguel Arteta. It stars Édgar Ramírez as an ex-cop who is sent back to his home state of Florida to solve a case. Abbey Lee, Otmara Marrero, Lex Scott Davis, Emory Cohen, Isaiah Johnson and Anthony LaPaglia also star in main roles. The series was shot in Wilmington, North Carolina.

Florida Man was released on April 13, 2023, on Netflix.

== Premise ==
Mike Valentine is a struggling ex-cop forced to return to his home state of Florida to find a Philly mobster's runaway girlfriend. What should be a quick gig becomes a spiraling journey into buried family secrets and an increasingly futile attempt to do the right thing.

== Cast ==
=== Main ===
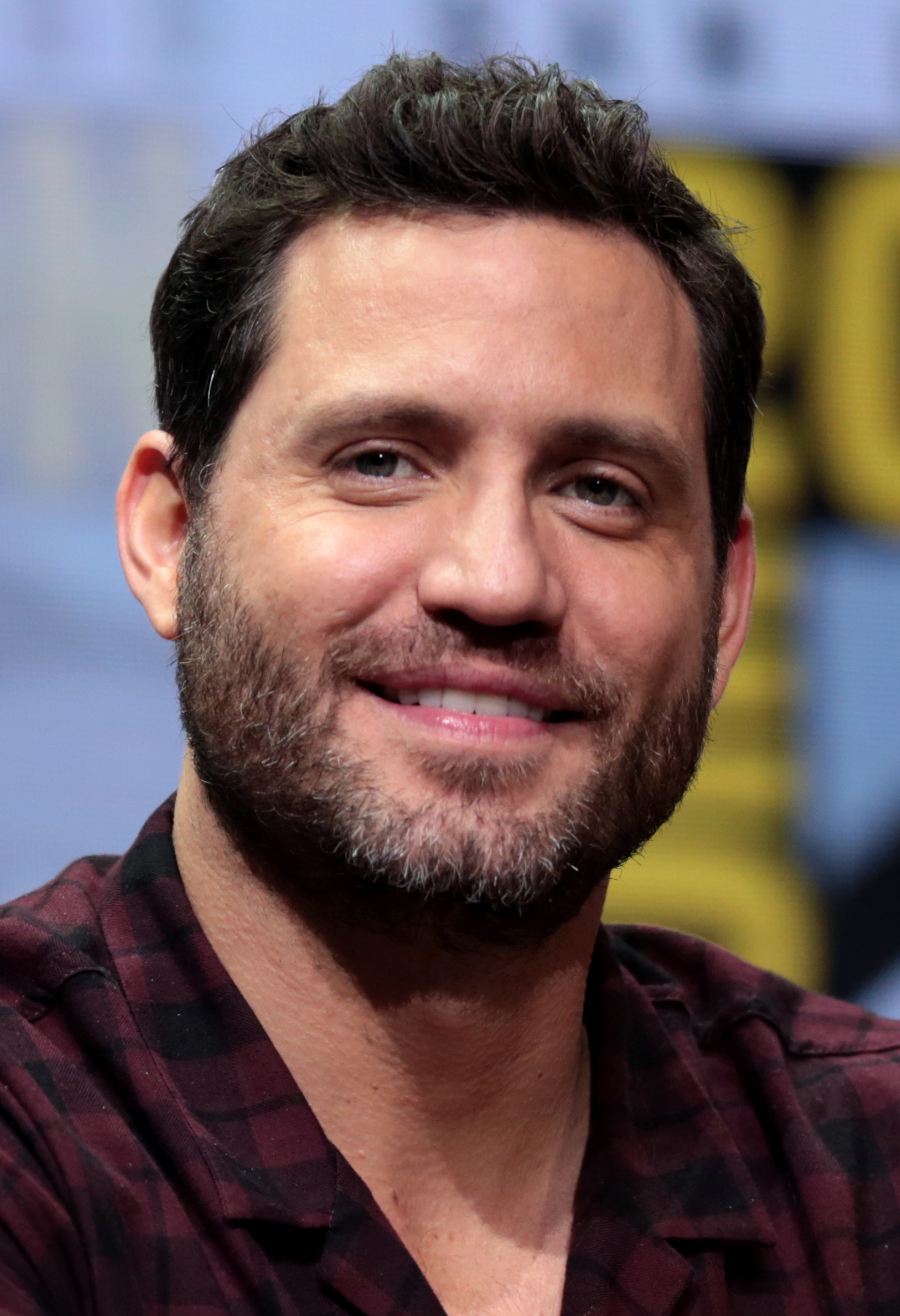
Édgar Ramírez portrays the lead character.

- Édgar Ramírez as Mike Valentine
- Abbey Lee as Delly West
- Otmara Marrero as Patsy, Mike's sister
- Lex Scott Davis as Iris, Mike's ex-wife and a detective
- Emory Cohen as Moss Yankov, Mike's boss
- Isaiah Johnson as Benny, a motel owner
- Anthony LaPaglia as Sonny Valentine, Mike's father

=== Recurring ===
- Clark Gregg as Deputy Sheriff Ketcher
- Sibongile Mlambo as Clara, Benny's wife
- Paul Schneider as Officer Andy Boone
- Lauren Buglioli as Kaitlin Fox, a news anchor
- Michael Esper as Deacon, Patsy's husband
- Leonard Earl Howze as Ray-Ray, a former cop
- Isabel Gameros as Tyler, Patsy and Deacon's 14-year-old daughter
- Judy Reyes as Captain Donna Delgado
- Mark Jeffrey Miller as Buzz, Sonny Valentine's associate
- Andres Sing as jail officer (uncredited)

== Episodes ==
| No. | Title | Directed by | Written by | Original release date |
|---|---|---|---|---|
| 1 | "The Realest Goddamned Place on Earth" | Miguel Arteta | Donald Todd | April 13, 2023 |
| 2 | "Welcome to Hell, Mike" | Julian Farino | Nikki Toscano | April 13, 2023 |
| 3 | "The Chain" | Julian Farino | Tom J. Astle | April 13, 2023 |
| 4 | "One More Day" | Haifaa al-Mansour | Alvaro Rodriguez | April 13, 2023 |
| 5 | "Please Don't Wake Up" | Haifaa al-Mansour | Donald Todd | April 13, 2023 |
| 6 | "Should We Talk About the Corn?" | Clark Gregg | Rheeqrheeq Chainey | April 13, 2023 |
| 7 | "Sunk Costs" | Clark Gregg | Donald Todd & Tom J. Astle | April 13, 2023 |

== Production ==
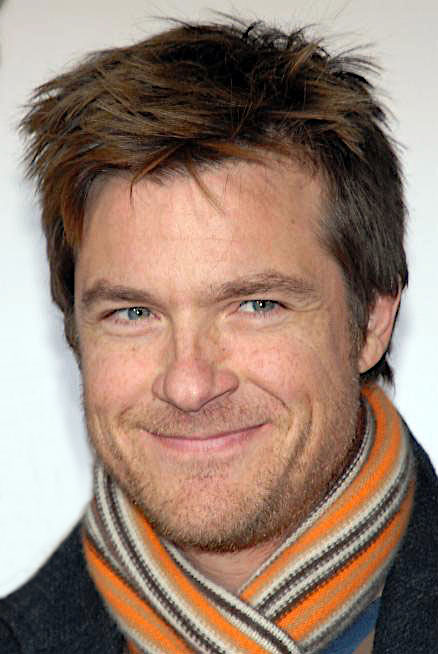
Producer Jason Bateman

In July 2018, Jason Bateman and Michael Costigan's Aggregate Films signed a multi-year production deal with Netflix. The largest partnership in the streamer's history at the time, this deal also served to increase Bateman's collaborations with Netflix after their revival of Arrested Development and the release of Ozark. In a statement, Bateman said the streamer's releases allowed him to avoid worrying about how many people watch his content and said "Netflix is succeeding on the merits and word of mouth and we are excited to bring them stuff."

In April 2021, Netflix announced that it had given an eight-episode series order to Florida Man with Édgar Ramírez attached to star and Aggregate Films set to produce. In August, it was reported that Miguel Arteta, Julian Farino, Haifaa al-Mansour, and Kevin Bray would direct two episodes each. That same month, Anthony LaPaglia, Abbey Lee, Otmara Marrero, Lex Scott Davis, Emory Cohen, Clark Gregg, Isaiah Johnson, Sibongile Mlambo, Paul Schneider, Lauren Buglioli, Michael Esper, Leonard Earl Howze, Isabel Gameros, and Mark Jeffrey Miller joined the cast.

Principal photography began on August 10, 2021, and was scheduled to conclude on November 16. Filming took place in Wilmington and Carolina Beach, North Carolina. After several filming delays, shooting continued in December 2021. The Pointe at Barclay, a shopping complex in Wilmington, was also a filming location. Cargo containers, colorful buildings, and wooden structures were brought to the complex for the shoot. Additional filming locations included Stevens Ace Hardware, UniFirst Uniform Services, Hell's Kitchen, Copper Penny, and Quanto Basta.

The limited series premiered on April 13, 2023, on Netflix, with seven episodes instead of the original eight-episode order.

== Reception ==
The review aggregator website Rotten Tomatoes reported a 22% approval rating with an average rating of 5/10, based on 9 critic reviews.
