= Dutch (2021 film) =

Crime film by Preston A. Whitmore II

- Directed by: Preston A. Whitmore II
- Written by: Preston A. Whitmore II
- Based on: Dutch by Teri Woods
- Produced by: Manny Halley
- Starring: Lance Gross; Natasha Marc; James Hyde; Jeremy Meeks; O.T. Genasis; Isabella Ferreira; Miles Stroter; James Quattrochi; Macy Gray; Markice Moore; Tyrin Turner; Melissa L. Williams; Robert Costanzo; JJ Batteast
- Cinematography: Brian Taylor
- Edited by: Andre Jones
- Music by: Chris Paultre
- Production company: Imani Films
- Distributed by: Faith Media Distribution
- Release date: March 12, 2021
- Running time: 109 minutes
- Country: United States
- Language: English
- Box office: $404,371

Dutch is a 2021 American romantic crime drama film written and directed by Preston A. Whitmore II and based on Teri Woods's novel of the same name. The film stars Lance Gross as Benard "Dutch" James, with Natasha Marc, James Hyde, Jeremy Meeks, Anthony Jacobs, O.T. Genasis, Isabella Ferreira, Miles Stroter, James Quattrochi, Macy Gray, Markice Moore, Tyrin Turner, Melissa L. Williams, Robert Costanzo and JJ Batteast.

The film was released in selected theatres on March 12, 2021, by Faith Media Distribution. It received negative reviews from critics and grossed $404,371.

== Cast ==
- Lance Gross as Benard "Dutch" James
  - Malcolm David Kelley as Teen Dutch
  - JJ Batteast as Young Dutch
- Natasha Marc as Michelle, Dutch's lawyer & later, new love interest, girlfriend, fiancee, wife & other mother of his child.
- James Hyde as Anthony Jacobs
- Jeremy Meeks as Craze
- O.T. Genasis as Kazami
- Isabella Ferreira
- Miles Stroter as Qwan
- Iyana Halley as Sam
- James Quattrochi as Frank
- Macy Gray as Delores Murphy
- Markice Moore as Zoom
- Tyrin Turner as Sugar Ray
- Melissa L. Williams as Nina, Dutch's love interest.
- Robert Costanzo as Fat Tony Cerone
- Bellamane and Rocsi Diaz as Angel Charlie, Dutch's new love interest & later, mother of his child & Goldielocs's ex-girlfriend.
  - Geraldine Moreno as Teen Angel
- Jamal Woolard as Roll
- Anthony 'Cream' Langston as Black
- D'Kia Anderson as Goldielocs, Angel's new love interest & later, ex-girlfriend.
- Noel Santiago as Cappo
- Liz Benoit as Kelly Yates
- Rashod Freelove as Malik
- Ebony N. Mayo as Sonya, Zoom's new love interest and later, girlfriend.
- Thabang Molaba as Mbaye
- Massi Furlan as Renato
- Giuseppe Russo as Ciccio Mancuso
- Denny Mendez as Carmela, Dutch's new girlfriend.

== Production ==
On February 28, 2020, it was reported that Lance Gross would star in the film directed by Preston Whitmore II and based on the New York Times Best Seller by Teri Woods. Macy Gray, Jeremy Meeks, Micheal Blackson, O.T. Genasis, Mellissa Williams, and James Hyde also were cast.

== Reception ==
On the review aggregator website Rotten Tomatoes, 20% of 5 critics' reviews are positive, with an average rating of 3.6/10.

Joe Leydon from Variety gave it a negative review writing: "There's nothing to recommend in writer-director Preston A. Whitmore II's small-budget, low-octane crime drama."

== Prequel series ==
In 2023, BET+ released Angel, a miniseries produced by Imani Films also based on Teri Woods's 2003 novel. The series follows Angel Alvarez (Efrangeliz Medina) who escapes foster care after years of abuse. The miniseries also starred Elise Neal as her abusive mother, Iyana Halley, Michele ‘Siya’ Sherman, Lana ‘MC Lyte’ Moorer, EJ King, Manny World, Jadah Blue, Nize, Jeremy Weaver, and Malcolm David Kelley as Dutch.

== Sequels ==
A sequel, Dutch II: Angel's Revenge, directed by Salvatore Sclafani, was released on BET+ on January 18, 2024. A third installment, Dutch III: International Gangster, also directed by Sclafani, was released on BET+ on July 31, 2025.
