= Gabrielle Union: My Journey to 50 =

2023 television documentary series

- Genre: Docuseries
- Starring: Gabrielle Union
- Country of origin: United States
- Original language: English
- No. of episodes: 2

Production
- Executive producers: Jesse Collins; Dionne Harmon; Madison Merritt; Elaine Metaxas; Sergio Alfaro; Tiffany Mills; Gabrielle Union; Kian Gass; Erin Beaurem; Tahira Francis Rogers; Monique Lauren Peters; Scott Pearlman
- Production locations: Zanzibar, Tanzania; Accra, Ghana; Namibia; Cape Town, South Africa
- Production companies: Jesse Collins Entertainment; I'll Have Another Productions

Original release
- Network: BET+
- Release: June 15, 2023

Gabrielle Union: My Journey to 50 is an American two-part docuseries that premiered on BET+ on June 15, 2023.

== Cast ==
- Gabrielle Union
- Dwyane Wade
- Kaavia James Union Wade
- Theresa Union (Gabrielle's mother)
- Katie Union (Gabrielle's aunt)
- Chelsea Union (Gabrielle's niece)
- Tracy Union (Gabrielle's sister)
- Adair Curtis
- Essence Atkins
- Angie Martinez

== Episodes ==
No.	Title	Original release date	BET air date	U.S. linear viewers (millions)
1	"Trials & Transformations"	June 15, 2023	October 15, 2023	N/A
2	"Monuments & Milestones"	June 15, 2023	October 15, 2023	N/A
