= Bobbi Baker =

American actress

- Born: July 8, 1981 (age 45); Raleigh, North Carolina, U.S.
- Occupation: Actress
- Years active: 2002–present
- Spouse: Nate James

Bobbi Baker (born July 8, 1981) is an American actress that is best known for her role as Kiki on the Tyler Perry sitcom House of Payne. She also had a role in the film Madea Goes to Jail. She is currently playing a role in Tyler Perry's Ruthless.

== Biography ==
Baker was born in Raleigh, North Carolina. She graduated from Athens Drive High School in 1998.

Baker attended Oxford School of Drama's Summer Intensive program in 2000. She graduated from Western Carolina University in 2001 with a degree in theatre. She also became a member of Delta Sigma Theta sorority at Western Carolina University's Pi Gamma chapter. Next she studied for four years at Juilliard, graduating in Spring 2007. Baker was the first person in the history of the Juilliard Drama Division to graduate with the honor of Scholastic Distinction for her work on a thesis entitled, To What Extent is Black Preaching a Manifestation of Black Culture?

=== Personal ===
She married Nate James in August 2007. James was a forward on and team captain of the Duke University basketball team when they won the 2001 NCAA championship. He later worked as an assistant coach at the school.

Their son Nathaniel III was born on July 26, 2009.

== Career ==
After graduating from Juilliard she acted as Claudia in Hartford Stage Company/Long Wharf Theatre's stage adaptation of Toni Morrison's first novel The Bluest Eye. Baker earned a solid review for her part in The Bluest Eye, with The New York Times writing:

"Bobbi Baker is just terrific as a barbershop owner, Claudia, easily conveying both her adult perspective on the events of her girlhood and the child's more limited understanding of them". Baker was also featured in the late Notorious B.I.G's One More Chance music video. Baker was standing by him in the bottom of the stairs dancing as he was rapping his verses.

In late 2007 an audition tape she submitted to Tyler Perry was selected and she was cast as Kiki on House of Payne.

Baker plays the recurring character of Kiki, a female barbershop employee, in the show's third season. The character, a slick-talking Northerner, was a challenge for Baker. "Kiki's a pistol...People don't see me as tough. I decided to dig deep and find this character. When we started shooting, she just started to emerge", Baker stated. Baker was subsequently asked to join House of Payne for additional seasons. Her work led Perry to cast her as the assistant district attorney in his film Madea Goes to Jail. "It's been sort of a 'work begets work' type experience for me," Baker said.

== Filmography ==
- Madea Goes to Jail (2009) as Tanya

== Television ==
- Dawson's Creek (2002) (1 episode)
- House of Payne (2008–2012) as Kiki
- Being Mary Jane (2014) as Rayna Hilson
- Ruthless (2020) as Cynthia
- Rap Shit (2022) as Mia's mom
