= Love You to Death (American TV series) =

2023 television documentary series

- Genre: Docuseries
- Country of origin: United States
- Original language: English
- No. of seasons: 1
- No. of episodes: 20

Production
- Running time: 41 minutes

Original release
- Network: BET+
- Release: March 23 – August 24, 2023

Love You to Death is an American docuseries that premiered on BET+ on March 23, 2023.

== Episodes ==
Season	Episodes	Originally released	
Season	Episodes	First released	Last released
1	20	March 23, 2023	August 24, 2023

=== Season 1 (2023) ===
No.	Title	Original release date	VH1 air date	U.S. linear viewers (millions)
1	"Unfaithful"	March 23, 2023	January 9, 2024	N/A
2	"The Deepest Betrayal"	March 23, 2023	January 16, 2024	N/A
3	"Fairytale Ended"	March 23, 2023	January 23, 2024	N/A
4	"A Cry for Help"	March 23, 2023	January 30, 2024	N/A
5	"Love Lessons"	March 23, 2023	February 6, 2024	N/A
6	"Too Much Love"	March 23, 2023	February 13, 2024	N/A
7	"Love Calling"	March 23, 2023	February 20, 2024	N/A
8	"Nightmare Before Prom"	March 23, 2023	February 27, 2024	N/A
9	"Tortured by Love"	March 23, 2023	March 5, 2024	N/A
10	"Body in the Bay"	March 23, 2023	March 12, 2024	N/A
11	"A Family Affair"	August 24, 2023	March 19, 2024	N/A
12	"Affairs of the Heart"	August 24, 2023	March 26, 2024	N/A
13	"Laws of Attraction"	August 24, 2023	April 2, 2024	N/A
14	"Missing in Missouri"	August 24, 2023	April 9, 2024	N/A
15	"Love Letter"	August 24, 2023	April 16, 2024	N/A
16	"Addicted to Love"	August 24, 2023	Final 2025	N/A
17	"Run Away Love"	August 24, 2023	Final 2025	N/A
18	"Family Secrets"	August 24, 2023	Final 2025	N/A
19	"Killer Performance"	August 24, 2023	Final 2025	N/A
20	"Can't Move On"	August 24, 2023	Final 2025	N/A
