= Ruthless (TV series) =

American drama television series by Tyler Perry

- Also known as: Tyler Perry's Ruthless
- Genre: Drama
- Created by: Tyler Perry
- Written by: Tyler Perry
- Directed by: Tyler Perry
- Starring: Melissa L. Williams; Matt Cedeño; Lenny Thomas; Yvonne Senat Jones; Baadja-Lyne Odums; Jaime M. Callica; Nirine S. Brown; Blue Kimble; Stephanie Charles; Herve Clermont; Anthony Bless; Bobbi Baker James; Stevie Baggs, Jr.; Colin McCalla; Samantha L. Thomas; Michelle Nuñez; Alise Willis; Jael Pettigrew; Nadège August; Joshua Adeyeye
- Composer: Elvin Ross
- Country of origin: United States
- Original language: English
- No. of seasons: 6
- No. of episodes: 115

Production
- Executive producers: Tyler Perry; Michelle Sneed; Mark E. Swinton
- Camera setup: Multiple camera
- Running time: 41-80 minutes
- Production company: Tyler Perry Studios

Original release
- Network: BET+
- Release: March 19, 2020 – May 1, 2025
- Network: Paramount+
- Release: June 30, 2026 – present

Related
- The Oval

Ruthless is an American drama series created, executive produced, written, and directed by Tyler Perry. The series is produced under Perry's overall deal with Viacom/CBS. It is a spin-off from the BET drama The Oval. The first season of 24-episodes premiered on March 19, 2020, on BET+. Starting on February 23, 2021, the show began airing on BET following new episodes of The Oval. Season 2 premiered on March 11, 2021. Season 3 premiered on March 10, 2022. Season 4 premiered on April 20, 2023. In April 2024 the show was renewed for a fifth season, which premiered on August 8, 2024.

The sixth season premiered on Paramount+ on June 30, 2026.

== Plot ==
In a backdoor pilot during the first three episodes of The Oval, Ruth Truesdale (Melissa L. Williams) kidnaps her daughter Callie to join her and the sex-crazed members of the Rakudushi cult. Ruth gains status within the cult after assisting in the punishment of her friend Tally, which earns her the position of Elder. However, in order to be initiated into the position of Elder, she is required to be gang-raped by seven high-ranking cult members, including Andrew and Dikhan, in the presence of The Highest. After being gang-raped, Ruth no longer wants to be a member of the cult and begins planning an escape with her best friend, Tally.

The leader of the Rakudushis is "the Highest" (Matt Cedeño). His demeanor is very calm, peaceful, and welcoming as this is to cover up the fact that he is a sexual sadist. He uses drugs to make newcomers black out and lose all memory in order to violently rape them. He himself is also a drug addict.

Dikhan (Lenny Thomas), is a high-ranking cult member who is the right hand to The Highest. He is the overseer of everything that happens on the cult's property. Dikhan is very handsome and loyal to The Highest, but he is also extremely invasive and stern. It is revealed in Season one, episode seven, that Dikhan and The Highest have been in a homosexual relationship for twelve years. However, Dikhan is bisexual. He has been having a secret affair with Ruth and is also attracted to Lynn (Nirdine Brown). Dikhan has fallen in love with Ruth, however, Ruth is only using him to plan her escape from the cult. Dikhan is under the impression that Ruth is pregnant with his child. He has to hide his feelings for Ruth because of his relationship with the Highest. It is also against the rules of the cult. The Highest becomes suspicious about Dikhan and Ruth, after smelling Ruth's soap on him. The Highest's fondness of Andrew and River causes Dikhan to become jealous and insecure. Members of all ranks of the cult fear Dikhan. Dikhan reports all wrongdoing of the cult members to The Highest and often recommends and inflicts their punishment.

The Rakudushi cult was infiltrated by undercover FBI agent Andrew (Blue Kimble) who eventually converted his beliefs into that of the religious sex cult and is in the process of becoming a high-ranking member of the Rakadushis. Andrew is married to Sarah and they have one son. After infiltrating and becoming an unwavering believer of the Rakadushi religion, he began a secret, forbidden, sexual affair with Tally (Yvonne Senat Jones), who is also a member of the Rakadushi cult. Andrew falls in love with Tally, and eventually gets her pregnant. Tally does not know that Andrew is an undercover FBI agent who is also married. Andrew is a very loyal member and believer of the Rakadushi cult and its beliefs. However, he is frequently torn between his beliefs and his love for Tally, when Tally is severely and continuously punished for her mistakes and rebellious behavior. Tally questions Andrew's love for her after finding out Andrew was one of the seven men who gang-raped Ruth. Andrew had homosexual sex with The Highest one time, proving his loyalty to the cult, but causing friction between him and Dikhan, due to Dikhan being in love with The Highest.

== Cast and characters ==
=== Main ===
- Melissa L. Williams as Ruth Truesdale
- Matt Cedeño as The Highest/Tyrone Luckett
- Lenny Thomas as Anthony/Dikhan (seasons 1–5)
- Yvonne Senat Jones as Tally (seasons 1–2)
- Baadja-Lyne Odums as Marva
- Jaime M. Callica as Brian Rollins (seasons 1–4)
- Nirine S. Brown as Lynn (seasons 1–4)
- Blue Kimble as Andrew (seasons 1–6)
- Stephanie Charles as Sarah (seasons 1–3)
- Herve Clermont as Mack (seasons 1–4)
- Anthony Bless as Malcolm Green
- Bobbi Baker James as Cynthia (seasons 1–3)
- Stevie Baggs, Jr. as Oliver (seasons 1–3)
- Colin McCalla as River
- Samantha L. Thomas as Paula
- Michelle Nuñez as Zane
- Alise Willis as Lacey (seasons 1–5)
- Jael Pettigrew as Clark (seasons 1–2)
- Nadège August as Joan (season 3–present, recurring seasons 1–2)
- Joshua Adeyeye as Manny (season 3–present, recurring season 1)

=== Recurring ===
- Kelvin Hair as Boboconati Smith
- Zephaniah Terry as William
- Robert Craighead as Sheriff Walker Conley
- Derek A. Dixon as Dale
- Ashleigh Morghan as Melinda (seasons 1–3)
- Jeremy Palko as Deputy Billy Poke (seasons 1–2)
- David Bianchi as Lilo
- Rhonda Stubbins White as Agnes (seasons 1–3)
- Steven G. Norfleet as Lewis (season 4–5)
- Pierre V. Johnson as George (season 4–6)
- Alex Cubis as Aaron (seasons 1, 3–5)
- Ekeobong as Laura (seasons 4–5)
- Gissette Valentin as Desiree Walton (season 4–present)
- Rocky Myers as Kal (season 4–present)
- Jason Alan Carvell as Obadiah (season 4-present)
- Dakota Kruz as Glitch (season 5)
- Telvin Griffin as Heat (season 5)

== Production ==
=== Development ===
The series was picked up by BET+ on November 7, 2019, with 24 episode order. The first season was shot over the course of 13 days in Atlanta. As production began during the height of the COVID pandemic, it was filmed in a quarantine "bubble" at Tyler Perry Studios in Atlanta.

=== Casting ===
Melissa Williams plays the lead role, after previously appearing on The Oval. New series regular cast members were announced in October 2020 to appear from the second season. Kelvin Hair was announced as a recurring cast member in March 2021.

== Episodes ==
Season	Episodes		Originally released		
Season	Episodes		First released	Last released	Network
1	24	12	March 19, 2020	June 4, 2020	BET+
1	24	12	November 26, 2020	January 28, 2021	BET+
2	19	9	March 11, 2021	April 22, 2021	BET+
2	19	10	November 25, 2021	January 13, 2022	BET+
3	22	11	March 10, 2022	May 5, 2022	BET+
3	22	11	December 8, 2022	February 2, 2023	BET+
4	22	10	April 20, 2023	June 15, 2023	BET+
4	22	12	February 1, 2024	April 4, 2024	BET+
5	18	8	August 8, 2024	September 12, 2024	BET+
5	18	10	March 13, 2025	May 1, 2025	BET+
6	20	10	June 30, 2026	August 25, 2026	Paramount+
6	20	10	TBA	TBA	Paramount+

=== Season 1 (2020–21) ===
No. overall	No. in season	Title	Directed by	Written by	Original release date
Part 1
1	1	"Pilot"	Tyler Perry	Tyler Perry	March 19, 2020
2	2	"The Precious Jewel"	Tyler Perry	Tyler Perry	March 19, 2020
3	3	"The Holy Ground"	Tyler Perry	Tyler Perry	March 19, 2020
4	4	"Waiting For Tomorrow"	Tyler Perry	Tyler Perry	March 26, 2020
5	5	"The Chosen"	Tyler Perry	Tyler Perry	April 2, 2020
6	6	"Lost"	Tyler Perry	Tyler Perry	April 9, 2020
7	7	"The Outsiders"	Tyler Perry	Tyler Perry	April 30, 2020
8	8	"Heaven On Earth"	Tyler Perry	Tyler Perry	May 7, 2020
9	9	"To Be Chosen"	Tyler Perry	Tyler Perry	May 14, 2020
10	10	"The Closer"	Tyler Perry	Tyler Perry	May 21, 2020
11	11	"The Devil's Brew"	Tyler Perry	Tyler Perry	May 28, 2020
12	12	"Wicked Acts"	Tyler Perry	Tyler Perry	June 4, 2020
Part 2
13	13	"An Angel From Heaven"	Tyler Perry	Tyler Perry	November 26, 2020
14	14	"The Restful Sleep"	Tyler Perry	Tyler Perry	November 26, 2020
15	15	"On Assignment"	Tyler Perry	Tyler Perry	November 26, 2020
16	16	"Quid Pro Quo"	Tyler Perry	Tyler Perry	December 3, 2020
17	17	"Unnatural Acts"	Tyler Perry	Tyler Perry	December 10, 2020
18	18	"Drinking My Scotch"	Tyler Perry	Tyler Perry	December 17, 2020
19	19	"The Purge"	Tyler Perry	Tyler Perry	December 24, 2020
20	20	"The Dark Walkers"	Tyler Perry	Tyler Perry	December 31, 2020
21	21	"Two Days"	Tyler Perry	Tyler Perry	January 7, 2021
22	22	"Into the Woods"	Tyler Perry	Tyler Perry	January 14, 2021
23	23	"Live Bait"	Tyler Perry	Tyler Perry	January 21, 2021
24	24	"Out of Time"	Tyler Perry	Tyler Perry	January 28, 2021

=== Season 2 (2021–22) ===
No. overall	No. in season	Title	Directed by	Written by	Original release date
Part 1
25	1	"The Outhouse"	Tyler Perry	Tyler Perry	March 11, 2021
26	2	"Over The Barrel"	Tyler Perry	Tyler Perry	March 11, 2021
27	3	"Holding On By A Thread"	Tyler Perry	Tyler Perry	March 11, 2021
28	4	"Duplicity"	Tyler Perry	Tyler Perry	March 18, 2021
29	5	"Agitators"	Tyler Perry	Tyler Perry	March 25, 2021
30	6	"Trust No One"	Tyler Perry	Tyler Perry	April 1, 2021
31	7	"The Code"	Tyler Perry	Tyler Perry	April 8, 2021
32	8	"Small Little Lies"	Tyler Perry	Tyler Perry	April 15, 2021
33	9	"The Ritual Bath"	Tyler Perry	Tyler Perry	April 22, 2021
Part 2
34	10	"My Brother's Keeper"	Tyler Perry	Tyler Perry	November 25, 2021
35	11	"Secrets of the Garden"	Tyler Perry	Tyler Perry	November 25, 2021
36	12	"Masquerade"	Tyler Perry	Tyler Perry	November 25, 2021
37	13	"Evil Deeds"	Tyler Perry	Tyler Perry	December 2, 2021
38	14	"Prophecy"	Tyler Perry	Tyler Perry	December 9, 2021
39	15	"Caged Birds"	Tyler Perry	Tyler Perry	December 16, 2021
40	16	"Retribution"	Tyler Perry	Tyler Perry	December 23, 2021
41	17	"Into the Woods"	Tyler Perry	Tyler Perry	December 30, 2021
42	18	"Precious Armor"	Tyler Perry	Tyler Perry	January 6, 2022
43	19	"The Raku Way"	Tyler Perry	Tyler Perry	January 13, 2022

=== Season 3 (2022–23) ===
No. overall	No. in season	Title	Directed by	Written by	Original release date
Part 1
44	1	"The Calming"	Tyler Perry	Tyler Perry	March 10, 2022
45	2	"Uncharted Territory"	Tyler Perry	Tyler Perry	March 10, 2022
46	3	"Prepare the Throne"	Tyler Perry	Tyler Perry	March 10, 2022
47	4	"The Highest To Be"	Tyler Perry	Tyler Perry	March 17, 2022
48	5	"Proving Grounds"	Tyler Perry	Tyler Perry	March 24, 2022
49	6	"Punishment and Games"	Tyler Perry	Tyler Perry	March 31, 2022
50	7	"The Strangers"	Tyler Perry	Tyler Perry	April 7, 2022
51	8	"A Masterful Plan"	Tyler Perry	Tyler Perry	April 14, 2022
52	9	"Does The Highest Know"	Tyler Perry	Tyler Perry	April 21, 2022
53	10	"The Law of Obedience"	Tyler Perry	Tyler Perry	April 28, 2022
54	11	"Late Supper"	Tyler Perry	Tyler Perry	May 5, 2022
Part 2
55	12	"Troubling Revelations"	Tyler Perry	Tyler Perry	December 8, 2022
56	13	"The Great Escape"	Tyler Perry	Tyler Perry	December 8, 2022
57	14	"Dilapidated"	Tyler Perry	Tyler Perry	December 8, 2022
58	15	"The Pencil Sharpener"	Tyler Perry	Tyler Perry	December 15, 2022
59	16	"Lessons Learned"	Tyler Perry	Tyler Perry	December 22, 2022
60	17	"Just Keep Breathing"	Tyler Perry	Tyler Perry	December 29, 2022
61	18	"No Mercy"	Tyler Perry	Tyler Perry	January 5, 2023
62	19	"When the Tables Turn"	Tyler Perry	Tyler Perry	January 12, 2023
63	20	"Dance and Punishment"	Tyler Perry	Tyler Perry	January 19, 2023
64	21	"Just One More Time"	Tyler Perry	Tyler Perry	January 26, 2023
65	22	"Enough Is Enough"	Tyler Perry	Tyler Perry	February 2, 2023

=== Season 4 (2023–24) ===
No. overall	No. in season	Title	Directed by	Written by	Original release date
Part 1
66	1	"A Matter of Time"	Tyler Perry	Tyler Perry	April 20, 2023
67	2	"What's Done in the Dark"	Tyler Perry	Tyler Perry	April 20, 2023
68	3	"Behind Closed Doors"	Tyler Perry	Tyler Perry	April 27, 2023
69	4	"Eager Little Flower"	Tyler Perry	Tyler Perry	May 4, 2023
70	5	"Close Call"	Tyler Perry	Tyler Perry	May 11, 2023
71	6	"Disappearing Act"	Tyler Perry	Tyler Perry	May 18, 2023
72	7	"You Have to Play the Game"	Tyler Perry	Tyler Perry	May 25, 2023
73	8	"Eye for an Eye"	Tyler Perry	Tyler Perry	June 1, 2023
74	9	"Wicked Intentions"	Tyler Perry	Tyler Perry	June 8, 2023
75	10	"Tonight Is the Night"	Tyler Perry	Tyler Perry	June 15, 2023
Part 2
76	11	"State of Emergency"	Tyler Perry	Tyler Perry	February 1, 2024
77	12	"The Art of Secrecy"	Tyler Perry	Tyler Perry	February 1, 2024
78	13	"Keep Fighting"	Tyler Perry	Tyler Perry	February 1, 2024
79	14	"Now You See Me"	Tyler Perry	Tyler Perry	February 8, 2024
80	15	"Do Or Die"	Tyler Perry	Tyler Perry	February 15, 2024
81	16	"Plan In Action"	Tyler Perry	Tyler Perry	February 22, 2024
82	17	"Crossing The Line"	Tyler Perry	Tyler Perry	February 29, 2024
83	18	"Hot On Their Tail"	Tyler Perry	Tyler Perry	March 7, 2024
84	19	"The Ticking Clock"	Tyler Perry	Tyler Perry	March 14, 2024
85	20	"Lamb To The Slaughter"	Tyler Perry	Tyler Perry	March 21, 2024
86	21	"Make Or Break"	Tyler Perry	Tyler Perry	March 28, 2024
87	22	"Fistful of Greed"	Tyler Perry	Tyler Perry	April 4, 2024

=== Season 5 (2024–25) ===
No. overall	No. in season	Title	Directed by	Written by	Original release date
Part 1
88	1	"Children of the New Paradise"	Armani Ortiz	Mansa Ra	August 8, 2024
89	2	"Il Fin Di Chi Fa Mal"	Armani Ortiz	Meagan Daine	August 8, 2024
90	3	"The Night is Long"	Armani Ortiz	Osokwe Tychicus Vasquez	August 8, 2024
91	4	"Death Will Bring Death"	Armani Ortiz	Osokwe Tychicus Vasquez	August 15, 2024
92	5	"The Measure"	Armani Ortiz	Branyon Davis	August 22, 2024
93	6	"Soup Du Jour"	Armani Ortiz	Dui Jarrod	August 29, 2024
94	7	"Revelations"	Armani Ortiz	Meagan Daine	September 5, 2024
95	8	"Of Mothers and Sons"	Armani Ortiz	Meagan Daine	September 12, 2024
Part 2
96	9	"The Sunshine"	Armani Ortiz	Branyon Davis	March 13, 2025
97	10	"The Song"	Armani Ortiz	Branyon Davis	March 13, 2025
98	11	"Sights and Silence"	Armani Ortiz	Dui Jarrod	March 13, 2025
99	12	"Pieces to Be Played"	Armani Ortiz	R.F. Drakaea	March 20, 2025
100	13	"I'm a Soldier"	Armani Ortiz	Mark Swinton	March 27, 2025
101	14	"He Lives"	Armani Ortiz	Osokwe Tychicus Vasquez	April 3, 2025
102	15	"Going to Battle"	Armani Ortiz	Mark Swinton	April 10, 2025
103	16	"The Unthinkable"	Armani Ortiz	Mark Swinton	April 17, 2025
104	17	"Into The Blackness"	Armani Ortiz	Mark Swinton	April 24, 2025
105	18	"Calamity"	Armani Ortiz	Mark Swinton	May 1, 2025

=== Season 6 (2026) ===
No. overall	No. in season	Title	Directed by	Written by	Original release date
Part 1
106	1	"Divine Intervention"	Courtney Glaudé	Courtney Glaudé	June 30, 2026
107	2	"The Chosen Son"	Courtney Glaudé	Courtney Glaudé	June 30, 2026
108	3	"The Agronytes"	Courtney Glaudé	Courtney Glaudé	July 7, 2026
109	4	"The Well Runs Dry"	Courtney Glaudé	Courtney Glaudé	July 14, 2026
110	5	"POWERless"	Courtney Glaudé	Courtney Glaudé	July 21, 2026
111	6	"The Naked Truth"	Courtney Glaudé	Courtney Glaudé	July 28, 2026
112	7	"Silent Negotiation"	Courtney Glaudé	Courtney Glaudé	August 4, 2026
113	8	"The Blood Still Works"	Courtney Glaudé	Courtney Glaudé	August 11, 2026
114	9	"Tunnel Vision"	Courtney Glaudé	Courtney Glaudé	August 18, 2026
115	10	"Fire and Desire"	Courtney Glaudé	Courtney Glaudé	August 25, 2026
