= Caught Up (TV series) =

American television sitcom

- Created by: Tyler Perry
- Starring: Jasmin Brown; Duby Maduegbunam; Alexis B. Santiago; Brittney Ayona Clemons; Jazmine Robinson; Avis-Marie Barnes; Mac Wells; E. Lloyd Napier; Mackenzie Clark; Sh'Kia; Courtney Mathew Julien; Adrian Eppley; Khalani Simon-Barrow; Michael Adonye; Oliver Blank; Leesa Neidel; J. Carlos Flores; Holly Pass; Eric Weston Davis; Chris Mayo; Drew Stephenson; Xzavier Beacham; DeRon Cash; Isaiah Johnson; Wendell Scott Jr.; Rashal James; Shay Mack
- Country of origin: United States
- Original language: English
- No. of seasons: 1
- No. of episodes: 4

Production
- Executive producers: Jasmin Brown; Tyler Perry
- Producers: Carmen K. Jones; Mark E. Swinton; Will Areu; Angi Bones
- Editor: Mike Greene
- Production company: Tyler Perry Studios

Original release
- Network: BET+
- Release: August 24, 2023

Caught Up is an American television comedy drama that premiered on BET+ on August 24, 2023.

== Plot ==
Jazzy was raised by her Caribbean parents to never settle for less, but her life changes when her seemingly perfect boyfriend drops an unexpected bombshell.

== Cast and characters ==
- Jasmin Brown as Jazzy, Toya
  - Katrina Rivera as Jazzy's stunt double
- Duby Maduegbunam as Wayne
- Alexis B. Santiago as Christina
- Brittney Ayona Clemons as Brenda
- Jazmine Robinson as Ashley
- Avis-Marie Barnes as Louise
- Mac Wells as Dooley
- Chris Mayo as Darius
- Drew Stephenson as Vin
- Xzavier Beacham as Male #1
- DeRon Cash as Lil' Smoke
- Isaiah Johnson as Terrell
- E. Lloyd Napier as Fayard
- Mackenzie Clark as Hostess
- Sh'Kia as Whitney
- Courtney Mathew Julien as Pastor Egbert
- Adrian Eppley as Operator V.O.
- Khalani Simon-Barrow as Lil Brenda
- Michael Adonye as Brother
- Oliver Blank as Library Clerk
- Leesa Neidel as Motivational Speaker
- J. Carlos Flores as Butler
- Holly Pass as Pharmacy Clerk
- Eric Weston Davis as News Reporter
- Wendell Scott Jr. as Gerald Brooks
- Rashal James as Lil' Smoke's Goon
- Shay Mack

== Episodes ==
No.	Title	Directed by	Written by	Original release date	VH1 air date
1	"Don't Judge Me"	Mark E. Swinton	Teleplay by : Tyler Perry & Jasmin Brown	August 24, 2023	September 30, 2024
2	"Right vs. Wrong"	Mark E. Swinton	Jasmin Brown	August 24, 2023	October 7, 2024
3	"A Love Poem"	Mark E. Swinton	Mark E. Swinton	August 24, 2023	October 14, 2024
4	"Complicated"	Mark E. Swinton	Mark E. Swinton	August 24, 2023	October 21, 2024
