= BET+ =

Defunct internet video on demand service

- Dissolved: 23 June 2026; 4 months ago (folded into Paramount+); 22 July 2026; 4 months ago (separated app)
- Successor: Paramount+ (BET Hub)
- Headquarters: New York City, New York, U.S.
- Area served: United States, American Samoa, Guam, Northern Mariana Islands, Palau, Puerto Rico, Virgin Islands
- Owner: Paramount Skydance Corporation
- Key people: Scott Mills (President); Tyler Perry; Devin Griffin (General manager)
- Parent: BET Media Group
- Website: bet.plus at the Wayback Machine (archived 2026-05-13)
- Launched: September 19, 2019; 7 years ago

BET+ was a streaming service operated by Tyler Perry Studios and the BET Media Group, a subsidiary of Paramount Skydance Corporation's Paramount Media Networks. The service was first announced on June 24, 2019, launched on September 19, 2019, and shut down on July 22, 2026.

BET+ featured both original films and television series from the BET program library and was the exclusive streaming home of programming produced by Tyler Perry, as part of BET's overall deal with him. Will Packer and Tracy Oliver also signed on to produce original programming for the service.

BET+ was part of Viacom's 2017 turnaround strategy, which saw the company acquiring and investing into digital platforms. Prior to the announcement of BET+, Viacom acquired the free streaming platform Pluto TV on March 4, 2019, and launched several channels branded after Viacom-owned cable networks and IPs, including BET-branded channels.

== History ==
Original BET+ logo from September 2019 to November 2021.

In 2017, Viacom launched BET Play, which carried BET original content but was not available in the United States. During that same year, Tyler Perry signed a multiyear production deal with Viacom.

On June 24, 2019, BET+ was announced as a joint venture between BET and Tyler Perry Studios, set to launch in the fall of that year. As part of his deal with BET, Perry has part ownership in the service.

On September 9, 2019, an official launch date was announced for September 19, 2019, and announced Devin Griffin as general manager of the streaming service. The service launched on September 19 that year. BET+ accounted for half of subscriber growth and nearly all revenue growth for BET in 2021.

On March 13, 2026, Paramount Skydance announced its purchase of Tyler Perry Studios' stake in BET+, with plans to shut down the service and folded it into Paramount+ on July 22, 2026, and its programming moving to the BET Hub.

== Original programming ==
=== Drama ===
Title	Genre	Premiere	Seasons	Length	Status
Ruthless	Drama	March 19, 2020	5 seasons, 104 episodes	41–80 min	Ended (Note: Moved to Paramount+.)
A Luv Tale	Drama	June 2, 2021	1 season, 6 episodes	11–20 min	Ended
All the Queen's Men	Drama	September 9, 2021	4 seasons, 62 episodes	33–50 min	Ended
Sacrifice	Thriller	November 4, 2021	1 season, 10 episodes	40–50 min	Ended
Kingdom Business	Drama	May 19, 2022	2 seasons, 16 episodes	41–51 min	Ended
The Black Hamptons	Drama	August 25, 2022	2 seasons, 12 episodes	43–44 min	Ended
Zatima	Comedy drama	September 22, 2022	4 seasons, 60 episodes	24–37 min	Ended
I Got a Story to Tell	Thriller anthology	October 27, 2022	6 episodes	41–88 min	Miniseries
Angel	Drama	January 5, 2023	1 season, 3 episodes	47–55 min	Ended
Legacy	Crime drama	March 2, 2023	3 episodes	30–46 min	Miniseries
Perimeter	Drama	February 29, 2024	1 season, 4 episodes	30–36 min	Ended
The Family Business: New Orleans	Crime drama	January 23, 2025	1 season, 8 episodes	43 min	Ended
Divorced Sistas	Drama	June 10, 2025	1 season, 8 episodes	42–51 min	Ended

=== Comedy ===
Title	Genre	Premiere	Seasons	Length	Status
Bigger	Comedy	September 19, 2019	2 seasons, 20 episodes	26–33 min	Ended
First Wives Club	Comedy	September 19, 2019	3 seasons, 29 episodes	25–35 min	Ended
Bruh	Comedy	May 7, 2020	4 seasons, 75 episodes	22–29 min	Ended
Leimert Park	Comedy	March 25, 2021	6 episodes	9–11 min	Miniseries
The Ms. Pat Show	Sitcom	August 12, 2021	5 seasons, 46 episodes	25–35 min	Ended
Real Husbands of Hollywood: More Kevin, More Problems	Satire	February 10, 2022	6 episodes	29–34 min	Miniseries
Average Joe	Dark comedy	June 26, 2023	1 season, 10 episodes	39–50 min	Ended
The Michael Blackson Show	Sitcom	July 27, 2023	1 season, 4 episodes	21–26 min	Ended
Caught Up	Comedy drama	August 24, 2023	1 season, 4 episodes	24–28 min	Ended
Churchy	Comedy drama	February 15, 2024	2 seasons, 16 episodes	20–30 min	Pending
Diarra from Detroit	Dark comedy	March 21, 2024	1 season, 8 episodes	39–45 min	Ended

=== Animation ===
Title	Genre	Premiere	Seasons	Length	Status
Lil Kev	Adult animated sitcom	March 6, 2025	1 season, 10 episodes	23 min	Ended

=== Unscripted ===
==== Docuseries ====
Title	Subject	Premiere	Seasons	Length	Status
American Gangster: Trap Queens	True crime	October 16, 2019	4 seasons, 40 episodes	41–47 min	Pending
All the Way Black	Comedy/culture	June 4, 2020	1 season, 12 episodes	19–22 min	Ended
Love You to Death	True crime	March 23, 2023	1 season, 20 episodes	41 min	Ended
Gabrielle Union: My Journey to 50	Travel	June 15, 2023	2 episodes	41 min	Miniseries

==== Reality ====
Title	Genre	Premiere	Seasons	Length	Status
College Hill: Celebrity Edition	Reality	June 27, 2022	3 seasons, 24 episodes	41 min	Ended
The Impact: Atlanta	Reality	October 5, 2022	3 seasons, 26 episodes	40–42 min	Ended
In Love & Toxic: Blue Therapy	Reality	October 19, 2023	1 season, 6 episodes	45–48 min	Ended
House on Fire	Reality	June 5, 2025	1 season, 8 episodes	45–53 min	Pending

==== Variety ====
Title	Genre	Premiere	Seasons	Length	Status
I Love Us	Comedy clip show	June 2, 2022	1 season, 10 episodes	21 min	Ended

=== Co-productions ===
These shows have been commissioned by BET+ in cooperation with a partner from another country.

Title	Genre	Partner/Country	Premiere	Seasons	Length	Status
The Porter	Drama	CBC Television/Canada	May 5, 2022	1 season, 8 episodes	46–54 min	Ended

=== Continuations ===
These shows have been picked up by BET+ for additional seasons after having aired previous seasons on another network.

Title	Genre	Prev. network(s)	Premiere	Seasons	Length	Status
The Family Business (seasons 2–6)	Crime drama	BET	July 2, 2020	5 seasons, 54 episodes	40–47 min	Ended
The Rich and the Ruthless (season 4)	Satire	Allblk	May 13, 2021	1 season, 5 episodes	22–28 min	Ended
Haus of Vicious (season 2)	Drama	BET	September 19, 2024	1 season, 8 episodes	43–44 min	Ended

=== Exclusive international distribution/co-productions ===
These shows have been acquired and co-produced by BET+ for exclusive first-run release in the United States through deals with international partners.

Title	Genre	Partner/Region	Premiere	Seasons	Length	Status
Dark Money	Drama	BBC One/United Kingdom	January 15, 2020	4 episodes	55–56 min	Miniseries
Diggstown	Legal drama	CBC Television/Canada	April 23, 2020	4 seasons, 26 episodes	44 min	Ended
Pulse	Science fiction thriller	Showmax/South Africa	August 18, 2022	1 season, 6 episodes	42 min	Ended

== Original films ==
=== Feature films ===
Title	Genre	Premiere	Length
Sacrifice	Thriller	December 19, 2019	1 h 16 min
Carl Weber's Influence	Mystery	February 20, 2020	1 h 32 min
Trigger	Thriller	October 22, 2020	1 h 7 min
The Business of Christmas	Holiday family film	December 3, 2020	1 h 45 min
Kiss Me for Christmas	Holiday romance	December 10, 2020	1 h 22 min
Troubled Waters	Drama	December 17, 2020	1 h 37 min
Never and Again	Romance	February 11, 2021	1 h 29 min
Redeemed	Drama	February 18, 2021	1 h 20 min
Favorite Son	Drama	May 6, 2021	1 h 35 min
American Gangster Presents: Big Fifty: The Delrhonda Hood Story	Biopic	September 30, 2021	1 h 35 min
A Rich Christmas	Holiday family drama	November 4, 2021	1 h 31 min
Soul Santa	Holiday comedy	November 11, 2021	1 h 35 min
A Jenkins Family Christmas	Holiday comedy drama	November 18, 2021	1 h 34 min
Christmas Deja Vu	Holiday fantasy	November 25, 2021	1 h 32 min
The Business of Christmas 2	Holiday drama	December 2, 2021	1 h 25 min
Merry Switchmas	Holiday family film	December 9, 2021	1 h 25 min
A Christmas Wish	Holiday family film	December 16, 2021	1 h 29 min
Christmas for Sale	Holiday romance	December 23, 2021	1 h 28 min
Dear Best Friend	Thriller	January 13, 2022	1 h 39 min
The Millennial	Drama	January 27, 2022	1 h 20 min
North of the 10	Comedy drama	February 10, 2022	2 h 34 min
A Royal Surprise	Romance	March 10, 2022	1 h 28 min
Unfinished	Thriller	March 24, 2022	1 h 41 min
Due Season	Drama	April 14, 2022	1 h 33 min
Trophy Wife	Drama	April 28, 2022	1 h 27 min
A Message From Brianna	Horror	May 12, 2022	1 h 20 min
Red Winter	Thriller	May 26, 2022	1 h 13 min
Outsiders	Thriller	June 2, 2022	1 h 25 min
B-Boy Blues	Drama	June 9, 2022	1 h 43 min
Block Party	Comedy	June 16, 2022	1 h 31 min
Bid for Love	Drama	June 23, 2022	1 h 21 min
The Ghost and the House of Truth	Drama	July 21, 2022	1 h 7 min
The Missing	Drama	August 25, 2022	1 h 29 min
Stalked Within	Drama thriller	September 8, 2022	1 h 22 min
Hello	Drama thriller	September 22, 2022	1 h 32 min
A Wesley Christmas	Holiday family film	November 3, 2022	1 h 38 min
The First Noelle	Holiday romantic comedy	November 10, 2022	1 h 30 min
Christmas Party Crashers	Holiday romantic comedy	November 17, 2022	1 h 24 min
Holiday Hideaway	Holiday family film/Romance	November 24, 2022	1 h 36 min
The Christmas Clapback	Holiday family film	November 24, 2022	1 h 20 min
The Sound of Christmas	Holiday musical	November 24, 2022	1 h 35 min
Rolling Into Christmas	Holiday romance	December 1, 2022	1 h 36 min
A Miracle Before Christmas	Holiday drama/Family/Fantasy	December 8, 2022	1 h 43 min
A Blackjack Christmas	Holiday family film	December 15, 2022	1 h 53 min
A Christmas Gift	Holiday family film	December 22, 2022	1 h 30 min
Imani	Thriller	January 6, 2023	1 h 30 min
The Reading	Thriller	February 2, 2023	1 h 36 min
My Valentine Crush	Romance	February 9, 2023	1 h 24 min
Under His Influence	Thriller	February 16, 2023	1 h 28 min
Infidelity	Drama	March 2, 2023	1 h 29 min
Game of Deceit	Drama thriller	March 9, 2023	1 h 28 min
Dance for Me	Thriller	March 30, 2023	1 h 32 min
Lethal Legacy	Drama thriller/Mystery	April 20, 2023	1 h 28 min
The Final Say	Romance	May 4, 2023	1 h 33 min
Love Marry Kill	Mystery thriller	May 18, 2023	1 h 36 min
Deadly Entanglement	Thriller	June 8, 2023	1 h 28 min
Jericho Ridge	Action thriller	June 29, 2023	1 h 27 min
Call Her King	Action thriller	July 7, 2023	1 h 39 min
Sisters	Crime drama/Thriller	August 3, 2023	1 h 35 min
Cruel Encounters	Thriller	August 10, 2023	1 h 31 min
Ruined	Thriller	August 17, 2023	1 h 32 min
Love & Murder: Atlanta Playboy Part One	Crime drama	September 21, 2023	1 h 38 min
Love & Murder: Atlanta Playboy Part Two	Crime drama	September 28, 2023	1 h 33 min
First Lady of BMF: The Tonesa Welch Story	Crime drama	October 5, 2023	1 h 44 min
Wake	Crime thriller	October 12, 2023	1 h 24 min
God's Grace: The Sheila Johnson Story	Biopic	October 19, 2023	1 h 41 min
Paradies	Thriller	October 23, 2023	1 h 9 min
Paradies 2	Thriller	October 23, 2023	1 h 9 min
Stay Out	Horror	October 26, 2023	1 h 37 min
A Wesley Christmas Wedding	Holiday romantic comedy	November 2, 2023	1 h 33 min
Heart for the Holidays	Holiday drama	November 2, 2023	1 h 32 min
Christmas Angel	Holiday drama/Musical/Romance	November 9, 2023	1 h 32 min
Sworn Justice: Taken Before Christmas	Holiday drama	November 16, 2023	1 h 29 min
So Fly Christmas	Holiday romance	November 23, 2023	1 h 32 min
A Royal Christmas Surprise	Holiday romance	November 30, 2023	1 h 32 min
The Christmas Ringer	Holiday romance	November 30, 2023	1 h 38 min
Never Alone for Christmas	Holiday comedy	December 7, 2023	1 h 39 min
Christmas Rescue	Holiday fantasy	December 14, 2023	1 h 24 min
Favorite Son Christmas	Holiday drama	December 14, 2023	1 h 40 min
Whatever It Takes	Holiday comedy drama	December 21, 2023	1 h 30 min
One Night Stay	Thriller	January 4, 2024	1 h 21 min
Dutch II: Angel's Revenge	Drama	January 18, 2024	1 h 48 min
My Valentine Wedding	Romance	February 8, 2024	1 h 41 min
Kemba	Biopic	February 22, 2024	1 h 47 min
For What It's Worth	Drama	March 7, 2024	1 h 31 min
Soul Mates	Thriller	March 21, 2024	1 h 35 min
The Despaired	Supernatural drama	May 2, 2024	1 h 28 min
The Deadly Getaway	Thriller	May 9, 2024	1 h 25 min
RSVP	Action	May 30, 2024	1 h 25 min
Incision	Thriller	June 6, 2024	1 h 39 min
Young. Wild. Free.	Crime/Drama/Romance/Thriller	June 29, 27, 2024	1 h 39 min
Who's Cheating Who?	Thriller	August 29, 2024	1 h 36 min
Trope	Horror	September 12, 2024	1 h 26 min
Deadly Intentions	Action	September 19, 2024	1 h 23 min
Dying to Be Famous	Thriller	October 3, 2024	1 h 23 min
A Christmas Miracle	Holiday family film	November 7, 2024	1 h 28 min
Style Me for Christmas	Holiday romantic comedy	November 14, 2024	1 h 38 min
A Wesley South African Christmas	Holiday family drama	November 21, 2024	1 h 36 min
The Day Before Christmas	Holiday romantic comedy	November 28, 2024	1 h 21 min
Brewster's Millions: Christmas	Holiday romantic comedy	December 5, 2024	1 h 40 min
Too Many Christmases	Holiday family film	December 12, 2024	1 h 32 min
Queens of Christmas	Holiday comedy	December 19, 2024	1 h 22 min
Blended Christmas	Holiday family film	December 25, 2024	1 h 22 min
Sugar Baby	Crime drama/Romantic thriller	February 13, 2025	1 h 22 min
Fighting to Be Me: The Dwen Curry Story	Crime/Drama	February 27, 2025	1 h 22 min
Soul of a Sister	Drama	March 27, 2025	1 h 22 min
The Accused	Thriller	April 4, 2025	1 h 22 min
Onyx	Sci-fi/Action	May 22, 2025	1 h 22 min
To Get Her	Action/Thriller	May 29, 2025	1 h 22 min
Dutch III: International Gangster	Crime drama	July 31, 2025	1 h 22 min
Peripheral	Horror/Thriller	August 7, 2025	1 h 22 min
Holy Hustle	Drama	September 4, 2025	1 h 22 min
Fatal Detour	Horror thriller	September 18, 2025	1 h 28 min
War Dawgz	Action thriller	October 16, 2025	1 h 28 min
A Demon's Revenge	Horror	October 30, 2025	1 h 37 min
Christmas by Design	Holiday romantic comedy	November 20, 2025	1 h 24 min
Son of the Preacher	Holiday romantic comedy	November 27, 2025	1 h 34 min
Love After Holidays	Holiday drama	December 4, 2025	1 h 15 min
Never Alone for Christmas: Memphis	Holiday romantic comedy	December 11, 2025	1 h 39 min
Vera's Holiday Flop	Holiday romantic comedy	December 18, 2025	1 h 37 min
A Soulful Christmas	Holiday romantic comedy	December 25, 2025	1 h 36 min

=== Stand-up comedy specials ===
Title	Premiere	Length
Preacher Lawson: Get to Know Me	February 20, 2020	58 min

=== Specials ===
Title	Genre	Premiere	Length
Tyler Perry's Madea's Farewell Play	Musical play	August 27, 2020	2 h 16 min
Martin: The Reunion	Unscripted reunion	June 16, 2022	1 h 32 min
Usher: Rendezvous in Paris	Concert film	May 8, 2025	1 h 42 min
