= Cristine Rose =

American actress

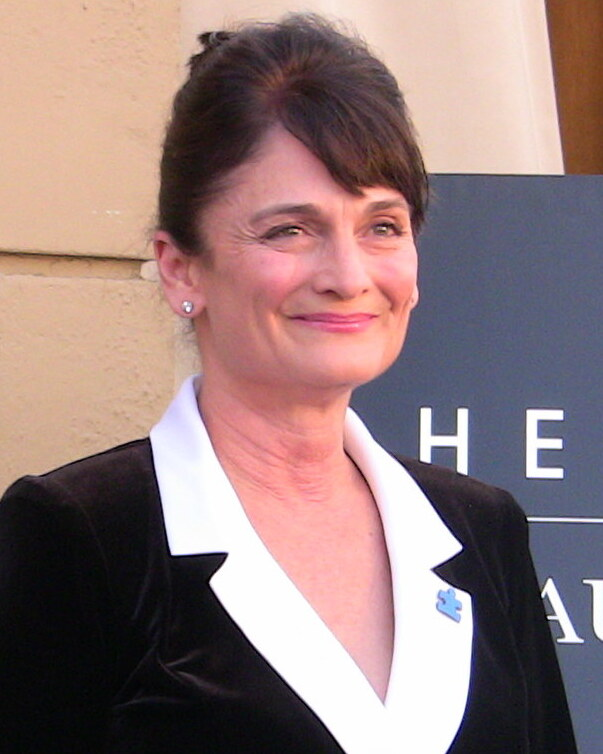
- Rose at Heroes for Autism event, Hollywood, California, April 19, 2009
- Occupation: Actress
- Years active: 1977–2018

Cristine Rose is an American actress. She is best known for her role as Angela Petrelli on the hit NBC science fiction drama Heroes.

== Career ==
She was a regular on the short-lived television series Ferris Bueller which was a TV remake of the famous film Ferris Bueller's Day Off which she co-starred in with a then-unknown Jennifer Aniston. She also had major recurring roles on Picket Fences as Lydia Brock, as Barbara Norton on Grace Under Fire, and on Providence as Cynthia Blake. She also had recurring roles on Ellen as Susan, and on Charmed as Claire Pryce, in both shows' premiere seasons; both characters were the boss of the series lead's characters in their respective jobs.

Rose has had guest roles in various shows, including 7th Heaven, Life Goes On, Friends, Days of Our Lives, Passions, Party of Five, The Wonder Years, Matlock, Malcolm in the Middle, Ally McBeal, Murder, She Wrote, Boston Legal, Diagnosis: Murder, Nash Bridges, CSI: Crime Scene Investigation, NCIS, NCIS: Los Angeles, The Practice, L.A. Law, Chicago Hope, Crossing Jordan, ER, St. Elsewhere, Star Trek: The Next Generation, Gilmore Girls, Kate & Allie, Murphy Brown, Newhart, Growing Pains, How I Met Your Mother, Sabrina, the Teenage Witch, Clueless, Dharma and Greg, Life with Bonnie, The Nanny, The Jamie Foxx Show, The King of Queens, Two and a Half Men, Big Love, The Mentalist, Six Feet Under, Charmed and How to Get Away with Murder.

From 2006 to 2010, Rose played Angela Petrelli on the NBC series Heroes. In 2008, her role went from recurring to series regular. She reprised her role in 2015 as part of the miniseries Heroes Reborn. As for her roles in movies as of 2009, she had a small role in the movie He's Just Not That Into You and was one of the main supporting characters on the Disney Channel television movie Go Figure.

== Filmography ==
=== Film ===
Year	Title	Role	Notes
1977	The Trial of Lee Harvey Oswald	Jackie Kennedy	Television movie
1986	Singing the Blues in Red	Lucy Bernstein	Film debut
1987	Ishtar	Siri Darma	Credited as Christine Rose
1988	Judgement in Berlin	Marsha Stern	
1985	Love, Long Distance	Sybil Sylver	Television movie
1988	Terrorist on Trial: The United States vs. Salim Ajami	Justice Department Woman	Television movie
1990	Burning Bridges	Gloria	Television movie
1990	Extreme Close-Up	Ms. Garfield	Television movie
1991	For the Very First Time	Mrs. Allen	Television movie
1991	Passion	Veronica Andrews	Television movie
1992	Just My Imagination	Brenda Sands	Television movie
1996	For the Future: The Irvine Fertility Scandal	Rina Manelli	Television movie
1997	The Last Time I Committed Suicide	Mrs. Greenway	Credited as Christine Rose
1999	The Big Split	unknown role	
2000	The Lost Child	Elaine	Television movie
2000	What Women Want	Sloane/Curtis Attorney	
2005	Go Figure	Natasha Goberman	Television movie
2005	Mrs. Harris	Suzanne	Television movie
2005	Enough About Me	Ruth	Television movie
2007	Cook Off!	Victoria Dougherty	
2008	Shades of Ray	Mrs. Khaliq	
2008	Float	Pamela Fulton	
2009	He's Just Not That Into You	Wealthy Divorcee	Uncredited
2010	Jeffie Was Here	Mrs. Mangold	
2011	Take Me Home	Lynnette	
2014	Any Other Friday	Connie	Short film
2014	Muffin Top: A Love Story	Deborah	
2015	The Better Half	Gwen	
2017	Cook Off	Victoria Dougherty	

=== Television ===
Year	Title	Role	Notes
1984	Kate & Allie	Rosie	Television debut Episode: "Candidate"
1985	Spenser: For Hire	Unknown role	Episode: "Children of a Tempest Storm"
1987	Matlock	Lacey St. John	Episode: "The Nurse"
1987	Growing Pains	Roseanne Flagg	Episode: "A Reason to Live"
1988	Mr. President	Agent Bell	Episode: "Insecurity"
1988	Moonlighting	Lauren Baxter	Episode: "Eek! A Spouse!"
1988	Just the Ten of Us	Kate Dibie	Episode: "Close Encounters"
1988	St. Elsewhere	Unknown role	Episode: "The Abby Singer Show" credited as Christine Rose
1988	Dear John	Gloria	Episode: "Pilot"
1988	My Sister Sam	Phyllis	Episode: "The Good, the Bad and the Auditor"
1988	L.A. Law	Gay Halloran	Episode: "Hand Roll Express"
1988-1989	TV 101	Mary Alice Peevey	Recurring role; 4 episodes
1989	Murder, She Wrote	Miss Hayes	Episode: "From Russia...with Blood"
1989	Valerie	Rita Traeger	2 episodes
1989	Newhart	Debbie	Episode: "Cupcake in a Cage"
1990	Murphy Brown	Beth	Episode: "Subpoena Envy"
1990	Life Goes On	Ms. Dougherty	Episode: "Corky's Crush"
1990	The Famous Teddy Z	Unknown role	Episode: "Pitching the Net"
1990-1991	Ferris Bueller	Barbara Bueller	Series regular; 13 episodes
1991	The Wonder Years	Dr. Ferleger	Episode: "Buster"
1991	CBS Schoolbreak Special	Marilyn Millers	Episode: "Dedicated to the One I Love"
1991	Growing Pains	Lucy Snyder	Episode: "The Big Fix"
1991	Civil Wars	Doris Stipes	Episode: "Daveja-Vu All Over Again"
1991	Anything But Love	Unknown role	Episode: "Salmonella Is Coming to Town"
1991	Davis Rules	Unknown role	Episode: "They're Writing Songs of Love, But Nun for Me"
1991	Uncle Buck	Gwen	Episode: "The Music Man"
1991	Palace Guard	Unknown role	Episode: "House Arrest"
1992	Night Court	Dr. Weeks	2 episodes
1992	Down the Shore	Wilma Shryer	Episode: "Schwing Time"
1992-1993	Flying Blind	Ellen Barash	Series regular; 12 episodes
1992-1996	Picket Fences	Lydia Brock	Recurring role; 5 episodes
1993	Star Trek: The Next Generation	Gi'ral	2 episodes
1993	Almost Home	The Director	Episode: "You Ought to Be in Pictures" credited as Christine Rose
1993	The Nanny	Dr. Bort	Episode: "Imaginary Friend" credited as Christine Rose
1993	L.A. Law	Attorney for Nat's Son	Episode: "Rhyme and Punishment"
1993	The Elvira Show	Lindsay	Unknown episode
1993-1996	Grace Under Fire	Barbara Norton	Recurring role; 4 episodes
1994	Models Inc.	Dr. Townsend	2 episodes
1994	Empty Nest	Nan	Episode: "The Courtship of Carol's Father"
1994	The Boys Are Back	Dina	Episode: "Fred Runs Away"
1994	Ellen	Susan	Recurring role; 3 episodes
1996	Chicago Hope	Judy Beckman	Episode: "Liar, Liar"
1996	The Jeff Foxworthy Show	Katherine Blosier	Episode: "Puppy Love Triangle"
1996	Nash Bridges	Desk Sergeant	Episode: "25 Hours of Christmas"
1997	Ellen	Emily	Episode: "Alone Again...Naturally"
1997	Moloney	Andrea Yates	Episode: "Ball & Chain"
1997	The Jamie Foxx Show	Marsha Darden	Episode: "I've Fallen and I Won't Get Up"
1997	Men Behaving Badly	Dorothy Halverson	Episode: "The Box"
1997	Party of Five	Jenny Selby	2 episodes
1997	Cracker: Mind Over Murder	Mrs. Lang	Episode: "Lemmings Will Fly"
1997	George & Leo	Ronnie	Episode: "The Review"
1997	Ally McBeal	Marci Hatfield	Episode: "Drawing the Lines"
1997	413 Hope St.	Mrs. Jefferson	Episode: "Quentin Goes Home"
1997-1998	Clueless	Mrs. Mumford	Recurring role; 3 episodes
1998	Sabrina, the Teenage Witch	Mrs. Chessler	Episode: "Five Easy Pieces of Libby"
1998	ER	Mrs. Martinez	Episode: "Shades of Gray"
1998	C-16: FBI	Leslie Dreyfuss	Episode: "Green Card"
1998	Prey	Sandra Cook	Episode: "Collaboration"
1998	Buddy Faro	Unknown role	Episode: "Touched by an Amnesiac"
1998	Dharma & Greg	Autumn	Episode: "Unarmed and Dangerous"
1998	The King of Queens	Helen	Episode: "Supermarket Story"
1999	Beverly Hills, 90210	Judge Mary Addison	Episode: "Trials and Tribulations"
1999	Zoe, Duncan Jack & Jane	Lilian Gottlieb/Johnny's Mother	Episode: "When Zoe Met Johnny"
1999	It's Like, You Know...	Zoe	Episode: "Welcome to L.A., Part 1"
1999	Charmed	Claire Pryce	Recurring role; 5 episodes credited as Christine Rose
1999	Honey, I Shrunk the Kids: The TV Show	Madame Curie	Episode: "Honey, It's a Blunderful Life"
1999-2000	Providence	Cynthia Blake	Recurring role; 7 episodes
2000	Diagnosis Murder	Sarah Prince	Episode: "Jake's Women"
2000	Days of Our Lives	Dawn Larson	Episode: "#1.8849"
2000	Bull	Mrs. Spencer	Episode: "Love's Labors Lost"
2001	Six Feet Under	Hannah	Episode: "An Open Book"
2001	The Agency	Margaret Callan	Episode: "Closure"
2001	Malcolm in the Middle	Mrs. Demarco	Episode: "Malcolm's Girlfriend"
2001	Philly	Dr. Ellen Kovell	Episode: "Loving Sons"
2001-2003	Gilmore Girls	Francine Hayden	2 episodes
2002	Any Day Now	Barbara Hoffman	Episode: "In Too Deep"
2002	Life with Bonnie	Shelly	Episode: "Pilot"
2002	The Practice	Bernice White	2 episodes
2002	Presidio Med	Unknown role	Episode: "When Approaching a Let-Go"
2002-2004	Friends	Bitsy Hannigan	2 episodes
2003	7th Heaven	Mrs. Iglitz	Episode: "Dick"
2003	The Lyon's Den	Ms. Conningham	Episode: "Beach House"
2003	Two and a Half Men	Lenore	Episode: "Merry Thanksgiving"
2004	NCIS	Pat Stone	Episode: "Dead Man Talking"
2004	CSI: Crime Scene Investigation	Grandma Giles	Episode: "Down the Drain"
2004	Without a Trace	Irene Shaw	Episode: "American Goddess"
2005	Boston Legal	Meredith Waters	Episode: "Men to Boys"
2006	Crossing Jordan	Dr. Wasserman	Episode: "Dreamland" credited as Christine Rose
2006	Commander in Chief	Alice Marlow	Episode: "The Elephant in the Room"
2006	Lovespring International	Alice	Episode: "Lydia's Perfect Man"
2006	Saved	Amanda Alden	Episode: "Secrets and Lies"
2006-2010	Heroes	Angela Petrelli	Recurring (seasons 1-2), main cast (seasons 3-4); 53 episodes
2006-2011	Big Love	Evelyn Linton	2 episodes
2006-2014	How I Met Your Mother	Virginia Mosby	Recurring role; 7 episodes
2007	State of Mind	Rosalind Warren, MD	2 episodes
2008	Heroes: Going Postal	Angela Petrelli	Television miniseries; episode: "Let's Talk"
2008-2009	Heroes: The Recruit	Angela Petrelli	Television miniseries series regular; 6 episodes
2010	The Mentalist	Pauline	Episode: "Pink Chanel Suite"
2010-2011	Brothers & Sisters	Dean Danielle Whitley	2 episodes
2011	Private Practice	Myra Freedman	Episode: "Something Old, Something New"
2011	Mad Love	Penny	Episode: "After the Fireworks"
2011	NCIS: Los Angeles	Alexa Comescu	2 episodes
2012	Longmire	Donna Craig	Episode: "The Worst Kind of Hunter"
2014	NCIS: New Orleans	Hannah Tarlow	Episode: "Chasing Ghosts"
2015	Aquarius	Grace's Mother	Episode: "A Whiter Shade of Pale"
2015-2016	Heroes Reborn	Angela Petrelli	Television miniseries; 3 episodes
2016-2017	How to Get Away with Murder	Judge Wenona Sansbury	2 episodes
2017	Trial & Error	Josie Davis	Recurring role; 8 episodes
2018	Sharp Objects	Nurse Beverly	Television miniseries; episode: "Falling"

=== Theater ===
Year	Title	Role	Notes
1979	The Rainmaker	Unknown role	Cape Playhouse
1981	My Sister in This House	Christine	Humana Festival
1981	Swop	Ruth Anne	Humana Festival
1981	Cul-De-Sac	Unknown role	Tyrone Guthrie Theater
1987	Reno and Yolanda	Raylene	
1989-1990	Uncle Vanya	Unknown role	Tyrone Guthrie Theater
