= List of The Jamie Foxx Show episodes =

The Jamie Foxx Show is an American sitcom created by Jamie Foxx and Bentley Kyle Evans for The WB. The series stars Jamie Foxx, Garcelle Beauvais, Christopher B. Duncan, Ellia English, and Garrett Morris. It premiered on August 28, 1996 and ended on January 14, 2001, with a total of 100 episodes over the course of 5 seasons.

== Series overview ==
Season	Episodes	Originally released	
Season	Episodes	First released	Last released
1	22	August 28, 1996	May 14, 1997
2	22	September 7, 1997	May 17, 1998
3	20	September 17, 1998	May 20, 1999
4	24	September 24, 1999	May 19, 2000
5	12	October 8, 2000	January 14, 2001

== Episodes ==
=== Season 1 (1996–1997) ===
No. overall	No. in season	Title	Directed by	Written by	Original release date	Prod. code	US viewers (millions)
1	1	"Pilot"	Steve Zuckerman	Story by : Bentley Kyle Evans & Jamie Foxx; Teleplay by : Bentley Kyle Evans	August 28, 1996	475314	5.5
When Jamie King arrives in Hollywood, California, from Texas, he dreams of succeeding in show business. First, he'll have to be content with working and living at the aging, once-famous Los Angeles hotel "The King's Tower", owned by his sensible aunt Helen King, and her troublesome husband Junior King. Attempting to ignore the uptight and condescending hotel accountant, Braxton P. Hartnabrig, and the dimwitted bellman Dennis, Jamie vies for the attention of the sexy and shrewd front desk clerk Francesca "Fancy" Monroe. Meanwhile, due to Junior's negligence and compulsive gambling, the hotel is in serious debt.
2	2	"The Bad Seed"	Shelley Jensen	Bentley Kyle Evans	September 4, 1996	465801	5.0
When Jamie learns that Fancy loves children, he tries to impress her by becoming mentor to young Nelson, the most harmless-looking child Jamie could find. But Nelson quickly figures out that Jamie is exploiting him to attract Fancy, and sets out to make Jamie's life hellish by blackmailing him and stealing various items from around the hotel: computer files, Junior's fine Cuban cigars, and Fancy's diary.
3	3	"Who's Da Man?"	Shelley Jensen	Kevin G. Boyd & Craig Davis	September 11, 1996	465802	5.4
Aunt Helen convinces Jamie to take heartbroken Braxton out on the town with him, to a club owned by basketball player Gary Payton. After some flirting lessons from Jamie, it's "B Smooth" who impresses the ladies. Meanwhile, Helen tries to cure Junior of lotto fever.
4	4	"Burned Twice by the Same Flame"	Shelley Jensen	Matt Wickline	September 18, 1996	465803	4.4
Jamie's newly engaged ex shows up at the hotel and he thinks she's there to see him, until she reveals she's there for a convention. Embarrassed, Jamie asks Fancy to pose as his girlfriend while the ex is in town. Meanwhile, Junior is stumped by a hotel plumbing problem.
5	5	"We Finally Got a Piece of the Pie"	John Sgueglia	Andy Wiley	September 25, 1996	465804	4.5
Jamie schemes with Junior to start a business selling Helen's popular sweet-potato pies and turns the hotel into a giant bakery, with Helen, Junior, and Fancy helping to bake. But when Jamie unwisely tastes one of the pies to find out why they are so popular, he eats the next day's entire order one after another.
6	6	"And Bubba Makes Three"	John Sgueglia	Larry Wilmore	October 2, 1996	465805	4.3
Braxton's going to be inducted into the Burgeoning Black Men's Club. However, his eccentric parents are in town at the same time, and he's worried they may ruin his induction.
7	7	"Stuck on You"	Scott Baio	Sandy Frank	October 9, 1996	465806	6.7
As an anniversary surprise for Helen, Junior secretly sends her wedding ring to a jeweler for reconditioning. At Junior's request, Jamie picks up the ring, but while showing the ring to Fancy and Braxton, Jamie hears Helen approaching and, panicking, slips it onto Fancy's finger—where it gets stuck. Jamie must think fast to save Junior's surprise.
8	8	"Kiss & Tell"	Scott Baio	Andy Wiley	October 30, 1996	465807	4.7
Jamie hosts a Halloween masquerade party at the hotel, complete with prize money for the best costume. When Fancy refuses to be his date, Jamie invites another woman, Chante, to make Fancy jealous. However, Fancy and Chante wear identical costumes. By mistake, Jamie passionately kisses Fancy, who hides the fact that she actually enjoys it. Jamie and Fancy then privately fantasize about each other.
9	9	"Seems Like Old Times"	Scott Baio	Kenny Snyder	November 6, 1996	465808	5.6
Junior reunites with his former army buddies, including "Charming" Charles, now a successful entertainment attorney. Impressed with Jamie, Charles promises to help his career by introducing him to powerful people. Thrilled, Jamie convinces Charles to stay in the hotel for a few days, then witnesses Charles making romantic advances to Helen. Jamie must choose between advancing his career or standing up for his family.
10	10	"A Star Is Almost Born"	Paul Miller	Cooper James	November 13, 1996	465809	4.8
Jamie's dreams of stardom come true with the arrival of director Ike Yee, who uses the hotel as the setting for his latest movie starring Jackie Chin and gives Jamie a role in the movie.
11	11	"A Killer Ending"	Shelley Jensen	Larry Wilmore	November 20, 1996	465810	5.1
Jamie thinks a hotel guest is a fugitive killer — who's eyeing Fancy as his next victim.
12	12	"A Thanksgiving to Remember"	Shelley Jensen	Andy Wiley	November 27, 1996	465811	5.3
Jamie's childhood friend Icepick, a flamboyant pro-football star cut by his team on Thanksgiving Day, threatens to jump from a window ledge.
13	13	"I Am What I Scam"	Shelley Jensen	Craig Davis	January 8, 1997	465812	5.38
Jamie is jealous when Fancy's smooth-talking ex-boyfriend Kenneth sweeps into the hotel flashing plenty of cash—and a diamond ring. However, news from two mysterious guests tells Jamie it's not time to ring those wedding bells just yet: they're about to nab a notorious scam artist.
14	14	"I Do, I Didn't"	Paul Miller	Kyra Keene & Janine Sherman	January 22, 1997	465813	5.92
Fancy throws a wild bachelorette party for her sorority sister Janine, but the bride gets cold feet the day after when she wakes up next to the stripper — Jamie.
15	15	"Little Red Corvette"	Art Dielhenn	Cooper James	January 29, 1997	465815	5.21
Jamie is much too quick to buy a Corvette off a shady guy on the street, and when the car turns out to be hot, he and Braxton land in jail with prisoners planning to tunnel to freedom.
16	16	"Act Like You Love Me"	Art Dielhenn	Sandy Frank	February 5, 1997	465814	5.01
Movie actress Edwina DuBois, a college gal pal of Helen's, tries to show Jamie the ways of the casting couch while teaching an acting seminar at the hotel.
17	17	"Westside"	Scott Baio	Leo Lawrence	February 12, 1997	465817	5.28
Jamie's left in charge for the weekend with one rule — no wild parties — a promise that's hard to keep when the Westside Connection checks in with a wad of cash and a huge entourage. Jamie must compete with a smitten Ice Cube for Fancy's affection. Then, with the hotel a complete mess due to the party, Jamie learns that Helen and Junior are returning home early.
18	18	"The Young and the Meatless"	Scott Baio	Stacey Lyn Evans	February 19, 1997	465818	5.68
Jamie has a beef with his conscience when he's offered a job as spokesperson for a hamburger joint right after agreeing to become a vegetarian, in order to impress Fancy.
19	19	"Step Up to Get Beat Down"	Steve Zuckerman	Kevin G. Boyd	February 26, 1997	465816	3.65
A chance to sing on a local radio show nets Jamie a contract with record mogul Sweet and Low, but when the deal comes up a little short he tries to raise the stakes—a move that leads to several "accidents" at the hotel. Eventually, Jamie annuls the contract by threatening to reveal some embarrassing information about the producer.
20	20	"Break Yourself, Fool"	Joel Zwick	Cooper James	April 30, 1997	465820	3.86
Fancy's new boyfriend, a police officer named Morris, has skills as a hostage negotiator that come in handy when Jamie and Braxton are held captive in a bank robbery gone awry.
21	21	"I've Fallen and I Won't Get Up"	Joel Zwick	Kevin G. Boyd & Craig Davis	May 7, 1997	465819	5.25
A hotel guest scams a free room after claiming to have fallen on a wet lobby floor. But when Jamie learns of her duplicity and boots her out, the Kings land in a courtroom. Jamie proves to the court that she is faking by saying that her dance moves are horrendous and she gets up and dances to prove that's a lie, exposing her as a scammer.
22	22	"Save the Drama for Your Mama"	Shelley Jensen	Bennie R. Richburg Jr.	May 14, 1997	465821	4.78
Jamie is looking forward to a visit from his mom, a chanteuse whose maternal duties often took a back seat to her career. When a call from her agent pulls her away from yet another important night in her son's life, it forces Jamie to face some hard truths about their relationship.

=== Season 2 (1997–1998) ===
No. overall	No. in season	Title	Directed by	Written by	Original release date	Prod. code	US viewers (millions)
23	1	"Freezer Burn"	Steve Zuckerman	Bentley Kyle Evans	September 7, 1997	466803	3.81
A pool party at the hotel turns frosty for Jamie, who gets locked in the freezer with Fancy and Braxton.
24	2	"The Accused"	Joel Zwick	Cooper James	September 14, 1997	466802	3.20
All fingers point to Braxton after a string of thefts at the hotel.
25	3	"The Employee Formerly Known as Prince"	Gerren Keith	Sandy Frank	September 21, 1997	466804	3.72
An African prince (Clifton Powell) takes a job at the hotel and pursues Fancy as his future princess.
26	4	"One Flew Over the County's Nest"	Shelley Jensen	Kyra Keene & Janine Sherman	September 28, 1997	466801	3.10
A knock on the head lands Jamie in the hospital, where he's mistakenly committed to the psychiatric ward.
27	5	"Is She Is, or Is She Ain't?"	Gerren Keith	Kevin G. Boyd	October 5, 1997	466805	3.88
Braxton seems to be dating a stripper (Mari Morrow).
28	6	"Do the Write Thing"	Jim Drake	Edward C. Evans & Arthur Harris	October 12, 1997	466807	3.63
Tim (Anthony Michael Hall), a Hollywood agent becomes interested in Jamie's TV script.
29	7	"Misery Loves Company"	Debbie Allen	Edward C. Evans & Arthur Harris	October 26, 1997	466809	3.88
A hotel guest (Ajai Sanders) becomes obsessed with making Jamie her eternal husband on Halloween.
30	8	"Dog Pounded"	Gerren Keith	Craig Davis	November 2, 1997	466806	2.37
Jamie agrees to dog-sit a celebrity canine in exchange for a chance to meet a top movie producer.
31	9	"Mo' Money, Mo' Problems"	Steve Zuckerman	Kevin G. Boyd	November 9, 1997	466808	4.01
When the family wins the lottery they end up having more problems then they thought.
32	10	"Traffic School Daze"	Gerren Keith	Craig Davis	November 16, 1997	466810	4.99
To avoid another ticket on his driving record, Jamie must go to traffic school.
33	11	"Too Much Soul Food"	Gerren Keith	Bennie R. Richburg Jr.	November 23, 1997	466812	4.08
Jamie takes a reluctant Junior to the hospital where he faces a serious diagnosis.
34	12	"Super Face Off"	Shelley Jensen	Cooper James	December 14, 1997	466811	3.89
There's a jewel thief being hunted in L.A. that looks like Jamie.
35	13	"Soul Mate to Cellmate"	Debbie Allen	Kenny Buford	January 11, 1998	466813	3.61
Jamie begins dating a woman named Carla (Tichina Arnold) to make Fancy jealous, but he later finds out that the woman is married to a man in prison.
36	14	"Papa Don't Preach"	Gerren Keith	Kyra Keene & Janine Sherman	January 18, 1998	466816	3.01
A minister's daughter finds that she likes performing with Jamie's band more than singing in the church choir. Guest appearances: Ronald Isley as Reverend Leroy Bullock, and Mary J. Blige as Ola Mae
37	15	"Convent-ional Gifts"	Amanda Bearse	Kyra Keene & Janine Sherman	February 1, 1998	466814	4.38
Jamie's bawdy present for Braxton winds up in the hands of Helen, who mistakes it for a gift she's giving a nun.
38	16	"Passenger 187"	Gerren Keith	Kenny Smith Jr.	February 8, 1998	466815	4.50
Jamie's first time on an airplane turns into an adventure after a little bad pork—and a lot of alcohol—leaves the pilot incapacitated.
39	17	"Ain't Nothin' Happenin' Cap'n"	Joel Zwick	Kevin G. Boyd	February 15, 1998	466818	4.42
Jamie is unable to perform when Fancy challenges him to meet her in her bedroom.
40	18	"It's All Good, Fellas"	Gerren Keith	Craig Davis	February 22, 1998	466819	5.03
Jamie saves the life of a mobster, who in turn offers to "eliminate" a fitness instructor who's caught Fancy's eye.
41	19	"You Ain’t Gotta Go Home, But…"	Joel Zwick	Edward C. Evans & Arthur Harris	March 1, 1998	466817	4.16
Financial woes cause Braxton and Jamie to become an odd couple of roommates.
42	20	"The Afterschool Special"	Gerren Keith	Cooper James	April 26, 1998	466820	4.50
Jamie's young pal Nelson (Orlando Brown) gets his hands on a gun after being worked over by a schoolyard bully.
43	21	"I'm Too Sexy For This Shoot"	Shelley Jensen	Story by : Brian Caldirola; Teleplay by : Kyra Keene & Janine Sherman	May 3, 1998	466821	4.21
Jamie and Braxton find what appear to be nude pictures of Fancy on the internet.
44	22	"How Jamie Got His Groove Back"	Gerren Keith	Story by : Devon Carter; Teleplay by : Kenny Smith Jr.	May 17, 1998	466822	3.97
Jamie is involved in a fender bender with vocalists K-Ci and JoJo.

=== Season 3 (1998–1999) ===
No. overall	No. in season	Title	Directed by	Written by	Original release date	Prod. code	US viewers (millions)
45	1	"Jamie Returns"	Gerren Keith	Bennie R. Richburg Jr.	September 17, 1998	467701	3.51
Jamie returns from his tour with K-Ci and JoJo to find that Fancy has moved on without him.
46	2	"Don't Hate the Player, Hate the Game"	Gerren Keith	Kevin G. Boyd & Bentley Kyle Evans	September 24, 1998	467702	2.85
Jamie feels guilty after his deception causes problems between Fancy and Silas (Alan F. Smith); Helen and Junior learn that honesty isn't always the best policy.
47	3	"MEN-o-pause"	Gerren Keith	Kevin G. Boyd	October 1, 1998	467703	3.88
Helen's youthful new look leaves Junior feeling like a senior citizen, so he asks for Jamie's help—and ends up with a makeover.
48	4	"Swing Out Sister"	Amanda Bearse	Josh Goldstein	October 8, 1998	467704	4.67
Jamie's little sister, Kim (Monica Calhoun), visits from Texas with big plans that her meddlesome brother objects to. Meanwhile, things begin to heat up between Braxton and his new friend Cameron.
49	5	"Is There a Doctor in the House?"	Shelley Jensen	Craig Davis	October 15, 1998	467705	4.02
When Silas gets called into surgery, Jamie steps in to escort Fancy to her high-school reunion.
50	6	"Guess Who's Not Coming to Dinner?"	Shelley Jensen	Kyra Keene & Janine Sherman	October 29, 1998	467706	3.59
Jamie tries to reunite Braxton with an old girlfriend, not realizing that Braxton is already seeing the GPS Girl.
51	7	"Just Don't Do It"	Amanda Bearse	Cooper James	November 5, 1998	467708	3.95
Jamie's mother (Jo Marie Payton) is engaged to a younger man (Gerald Levert).
52	8	"We Got No Game"	Gerren Keith	Arthur Harris & Edward C. Evans	November 12, 1998	467707	4.33
Jamie takes on the challenge of coaching a Pee-Wee basketball team, but gets frustrated during a game and challenges the opposing coach to a personal grudge match. The opposing coach, who is an NBA player is sure to beat Jamie, unless Jamie can find some help.
53	9	"Lonesome Cow-Bro"	Amanda Bearse	Brian Caldirola	November 19, 1998	467709	3.33
Junior and Helen tell Jamie the story of their ancestors' first hotel.
54	10	"Christmas Day-Ja Vu"	Amanda Bearse	Cooper James	December 17, 1998	467710	4.24
Jamie has his own version of Ground Hog Day by reliving Christmas Eve as a mall Santa puts a curse on him to teach him the meaning of Christmas.
55	11	"Taps for Royal"	John Bowab	Josh Goldstein	January 14, 1999	467711	4.44
Jamie tries to reunite Uncle Junior with his long-lost best friend, Royal (Ben Vereen).
56	12	"Bro-Jack"	Joel Zwick	Edward C. Evans & Arthur Harris	January 21, 1999	467712	4.43
Jamie must find the art thief who hit an art auction at the King's Tower.
57	13	"Scareder Than a Mug"	Joel Zwick	Kyra Keene & Janine Sherman	February 4, 1999	467713	4.40
Helen's encounter with a mugger sends her into therapy.
58	14	"Forever Your Girl"	John Bowab	Kyra Keene & Janine Sherman	February 11, 1999	467715	4.30
Jamie falls for a hotel guest in town searching for her biological father.
59	15	"Where There's a Will, Go the Other Way"	Joel Zwick	Kenny Smith Jr.	February 18, 1999	467714	3.8
Jamie learns that Junior and Helen are leaving him the hotel in their will.
60	16	"Uncle Junior's Cabin"	Gerren Keith	Charles B. Proctor	February 25, 1999	467716	4.16
Junior and Helen offer stressed employees their cabin for a weekend getaway but the staff accidentally get trapped in the cabin with no food.
61	17	"Change of Heart"	Gerren Keith	Kevin G. Boyd	April 29, 1999	467720	4.09
Fancy and Silas's relationship goes on the rocks. They decide to go on the game show Change of Heart, dating other people to decide if they should remain together.
62	18	"Fire and Desire: Part 1"	Joel Zwick	Craig Davis	May 6, 1999	467717	3.51
While dealing with her relationship with Silas, Fancy now has to deal with her jealousy of Jamie and Cherise.
63	19	"Fire and Desire: Part 2"	Joel Zwick	Kenny Smith Jr.	May 13, 1999	467718	3.77
While the heroic Jamie and Cherise revel in the spotlight, Fancy burns with jealousy.
64	20	"Always Follow Your Heart"	Shelley Jensen	Cooper James	May 20, 1999	467719	2.87
Fancy tells Jamie how she feels about him and they get together.

=== Season 4 (1999–2000) ===
No. overall	No. in season	Title	Directed by	Written by	Original release date	Prod. code	US viewers (millions)
65	1	"Just Fancy"	Steve Zuckerman	Mara Brock Akil	September 24, 1999	225352	2.65
When Jamie introduces Fancy to hotel guest Debbe Dunning without mentioning that she's his girlfriend, Fancy feels slighted.
66	2	"Mr. Bo-Jingles"	Steve Zuckerman	Cooper James	September 24, 1999	225351	3.35
Braxton and Fancy get promotions and Jamie feels left out that he didn't get a promotion, so he decides to quit and he gets a new job as a jingle writer at Jingles 2000.
67	3	"Poker Face"	Shelley Jensen	Kevin G. Boyd	October 1, 1999	225353	2.74
When Jamie ignores Fancy in favor of a poker game with the guys, she crashes the game and shows everyone how well she can play. Meanwhile, Braxton has problems with the Y2K upgrade he installed on the hotel's computer system.
68	4	"I Believe I Can Fly"	Shelley Jensen	Kenny Smith	October 1, 1999	225354	3.45
When Jamie's commercial jingle is rejected, he sends an irate e-mail to everyone at Jingles 2000. Meanwhile, Fancy brings a group of "Family Feud" contestants to King's Tower.
69	5	"Why Don't We Just Roll... Reversal"	Shelley Jensen	Michael Carrington	October 8, 1999	225355	1.84
Inspired by their friends at a party, Jamie and Fancy try a role-reversal exercise that leads to a late-night argument about their future together. Meanwhile, Gloria tries to get a promotion to head of housekeeping.
70	6	"The Ugly Truth"	Gerren Keith	Cooper James	October 15, 1999	225360	2.98
Jamie can't believe it when his position as top jingle writer is threatened by a woman who he thinks was hired just for her looks. Meanwhile, Fancy goes after a rich new client for the hotel.
71	7	"Homie, Lover, Friend"	Mark Cendrowski	Bentley Kyle Evans & Kevin G. Boyd	October 22, 1999	225357	2.97
Jamie becomes jealous when Marcus (Thomas Mikal Ford), an old boyfriend of Fancy's invites her to an exhibit at his art gallery, resulting in a confrontation over the matter of trust in their relationship.
72	8	"Give Me Some Credit"	Sheldon Epps	Mara Brock Akil	November 5, 1999	225359	2.78
After his credit card is denied while clothes shopping with Fancy and her well-to-do parents, Jamie must prove to her father that he will be able to provide for her. Meanwhile, Braxton is forced to cut the hotel's budget.
73	9	"Liar, Liar, Pants on Fire"	Shelley Jensen	Yolanda Braxton-Sherman	November 12, 1999	225356	3.23
Jamie is afraid of what Fancy will think if she finds out that he has been escorting a young female client on the firm's orders, so he lies about why he has been breaking their dates. Meanwhile, Braxton decides to take up Fancy's idea for sprucing up the rooms at the hotel.
74	10	"Joy Ride"	Shelley Jensen	Rushion McDonald	November 19, 1999	225358	3.03
When Jamie borrows Fancy's new BMW convertible for a beach outing, it gets towed away. Meanwhile, Braxton tries to avert a strike at the hotel.
75	11	"Get Up, Stand Up"	Richard Correll	Kenny Smith	December 3, 1999	225361	3.00
Fancy needs a new kitchen countertop installed in time for Nikki's bridal shower, which Fancy reluctantly agrees to host. Meanwhile, Braxton dreads attending an awards banquet in his honor because he can't find a date.
76	12	"Super Ego"	Richard Correll	Rushion McDonald	January 7, 2000	225362	3.45
Fancy and her friends are kicked out of Jamie's NFL playoff party and leave the hotel with football's Lawrence Taylor and Charles Woodson. When Jamie catches up with the girls and their new friends at another bash, his big mouth leads to an athletic challenge.
77	13	"Family Business"	Richard Correll	Michael Carrington	January 14, 2000	225363	2.89
Jamie writes a jingle for a commercial promoting the King's Tower and he charges his aunt and uncle for his services, which jeopardizes his free lodging at the hotel.
78	14	"Friendly Fire"	Shelley Jensen	Bennie R. Richburg Jr.	January 28, 2000	225364	2.97
Jamie is promoted to supervisor at Jingles 2000. His first task: fire an incompetent writer who is also one of his friends. Meanwhile, a flu epidemic hits the hotel staff.
79	15	"Home Suite Home"	Richard Correll	Mara Brock Akil	February 4, 2000	225365	3.02
Jamie joyfully moves into his own bachelor pad, but when Fancy starts decorating it for him, he begins to feel a little crowded by her constant presence.
80	16	"Behind the Jingle"	Richard Correll	Kevin G. Boyd	February 11, 2000	225366	2.76
The pressures of being a supervisor affect the quality of Jamie's jingles, so he passes off one of Mouse's ideas as his own, which leads to a guilt-filled dream about his future.
81	17	"Partner fo' Life"	Gerren Keith	Michael Carrington	February 18, 2000	225367	3.22
To cover the medical costs of an injured friend, Jamie signs insurance forms that claim he and his friend are life partners, which leads to a misinterpreted party invitation.
82	18	"Hot Coco on a Cold Night"	Gerren Keith	Kenny Smith	February 25, 2000	225368	2.53
Fancy fulfills a fantasy for Jamie by waiting on him hand and foot, and he begins to prefer his dream lover to the real thing. He expects his girlfriend to pamper him continually, which leads to an embarrassing display of attention during an important business dinner.
83	19	"Rollin' in the Dough"	Gerren Keith	Greg D. Shelton	April 7, 2000	225369	2.01
Jamie advises Braxton's financial group to invest in a doughnut franchise, but Braxton balks at the idea, causing the other members of the group to kick him out.
84	20	"Musical Chairs"	Mark Cendrowski	Rushion McDonald	April 21, 2000	225371	2.32
Jamie sings with Nicole at a nightclub, which rekindles his interests in a career in music—despite Fancy's misgivings. Jamie later agrees to perform with Nicole again after they are asked back for another gig.
85	21	"Jamie in the Middle"	Richard Correll	Cooper James	April 28, 2000	225370	2.34
Jamie works on a jingle with Method Man and Redman and they both seek Jamie's help in courting Nicole, but she doesn't date rappers.
86	22	"I Second That Demo-tion"	Shelley Jensen	Bennie R. Richburg Jr.	May 5, 2000	225372	2.14
Jamie and Nicole risk their jobs by working on their demo tape in the Jingles 2000 studio after hours—against company policy and they later meet the night janitor who claims he is related to Montell Jordan.
87	23	"Roadtrip: Part 1"	Gerren Keith	Adriane Kelly	May 12, 2000	225373	2.12
Nicole kisses Jamie on the stage before they perform a gig in Las Vegas, a trip Fancy refused to join them on. Fancy then makes a surprise visit to Jamie's hotel room only to find that he is sharing it with Nicole.
88	24	"Roadtrip: Part 2"	Shelley Jensen	Bennie R. Richburg Jr.	May 19, 2000	225374	2.98
To win Fancy back, Jamie buys her an engagement ring, only to get an offer from Nicole to sing with her on tour in Europe.

=== Season 5 (2000–2001) ===
No. overall	No. in season	Title	Directed by	Written by	Original release date	Prod. code	US viewers (millions)
89	1	"On Bended Knee"	Gerren Keith	Cooper James	October 8, 2000	226451	2.62
Jamie balks at proposing to Fancy, so he breaks up with her—but accidentally leaves an engagement ring at her apartment. He and his pals then search her place for the rock, hoping to find it before Fancy does.
90	2	"Double or Nothing"	Gerren Keith	Kenny Smith	October 15, 2000	226452	2.31
Phil and Mouse take Jamie to a club to help him get over losing his job and Fancy, but Jamie's pickup lines fall flat with the ladies. Then he meets a woman named Nancy (Golden Brooks), who seems to have much in common with Fancy.
91	3	"Serve No Wine Before I Get Mine"	Richard Correll	Michael Carrington	October 22, 2000	226453	2.70
After a series of low-paying gigs, Jamie gets a break and records one of his original songs for a record producer, but the arrangement might not be as legitimate as the singer thinks.
92	4	"Shades of Gray"	Bentley Kyle Evans	Mara Brock Akil	October 29, 2000	226454	3.14
A lonely Jamie spends the night with Fancy at her apartment, but the morning after proves awkward for the former couple. The tension increases later that night when Jamie sees Fancy with another man at a party.
93	5	"I'll Do It My Dammy.com"	Richard Correll	Kevin G. Boyd	November 5, 2000	226455	2.88
Jamie refuses to sign with a record company and instead tries to sell compact discs of his original music over the internet (parodying the film The Matrix).
94	6	"Candy Girl"	Mark Cendrowski	Adriane Kelly	November 12, 2000	226457	2.83
Jamie wants to film a video for his latest song at the hotel, but Helen opposes the idea because of the video's sexual content. To further complicate matters, the actress slated to appear in the video objects to her lack of wardrobe.
95	7	"Shakin' and Fakin"	Shelley Jensen	Kenny Smith	November 19, 2000	226456	2.34
Jamie gets sick after eating Japanese food and Fancy nurses him through the night, only to have him fake a relapse the next day to keep her from going out with another guy.
96	8	"If the Shoe Fits..."	Jamie Foxx	Bennie R. Richburg Jr.	November 26, 2000	226460	2.90
Jamie finds a pair of size-22 sneakers under Fancy's bed and he thinks that she is involved with NBA star Kevin Garnett, who books a press conference at the hotel.
97	9	"Cupid"	Mark Cendrowski	Michael Carrington	December 10, 2000	226458	2.56
After striking out with Fancy at a bowling alley, Jamie calls upon Cupid (Gary Coleman) to help him win back Fancy's affections. Meanwhile, Mouse starts dating a new woman he met with the love god's help.
98	10	"Bachelor Party"	Jamie Foxx	Cooper James	December 17, 2000	226459	2.75
Jamie catches Fancy auditioning male dancers for her bachelorette party after they each promised not to have such gatherings, so he and Mouse plan to get even.
99	11	"East Side Story"	Shelley Jensen	James Webb	January 7, 2001	226461	2.45
The Kings announce their retirement and offer the hotel to Jamie and Fancy — but Fancy considers a job offer in New York. Meanwhile, Braxton feels unappreciated at work, having assumed that his time at the hotel would merit his taking over the operation.
100	12	"Always and Forever"	Gerren Keith	Bentley Kyle Evans	January 14, 2001	226462	2.82
Many things get in the way of Jamie and Francesca's wedding.
