= Maneater =

Maneater or man-eater may refer to:

- Human cannibal, a human who eats other humans
- Man-eating animal, an individual animal or being that preys on humans as a pattern of hunting behavior
- Man-eating plant, a fictional form of carnivorous plant large enough to kill and consume a human or other large animal
- Femme fatale, a stock character of a mysterious, beautiful, and seductive woman whose charms ensnare her lovers, often leading them into compromising, deadly traps

== Film and television ==
- Shark! (a.k.a. Man-Eater), a 1969 Mexican-American action film
- The Man-Eater (film), a 1999 Italian erotic drama film
- Maneater (2007 film), an American natural horror film
- Maneater (2009 film), an American natural horror film
- Maneater (2022 film), an American horror thriller film
- Maneater (film series), an American natural horror film series
- Maneater (miniseries), an American television miniseries
- "Maneater" (Eureka), an episode of the television series Eureka
- Mangeuses d'hommes (a.k.a. Man Eaters), a 1988 French sexual comedy/horror film

== Games ==
- Maneater (video game), a 2020 video game
- Man Eater, a fictional character in the video game series Castlevania
- Maneaters, fictional characters in the Warhammer Fantasy setting
- Maneaters, a type of enemy from the video game Lethal Company

== Music ==
- "Maneater" (Hall & Oates song), a 1982 song by Daryl Hall and John Oates
- "Maneater" (Nelly Furtado song), a 2006 song by Nelly Furtado

== Other uses ==
- The Maneater, an American newspaper
- Man-Eaters, an American comic book series by Chelsea Cain, Kate Niemczyk, and Lia Miternique

== See also ==
- Man Eaters and Jungle Killers, a 1957 book by Kenneth Anderson
- Man-Eaters of Kumaon, a 1944 book by Jim Corbett
  - Man-Eater of Kumaon, a 1948 American film
- The Man-Eater of Malgudi, a 1961 novel by R. K. Narayan
- The Man-Eating Myth, a 1979 book by William Arens
