= Raven Goodwin =

American actress

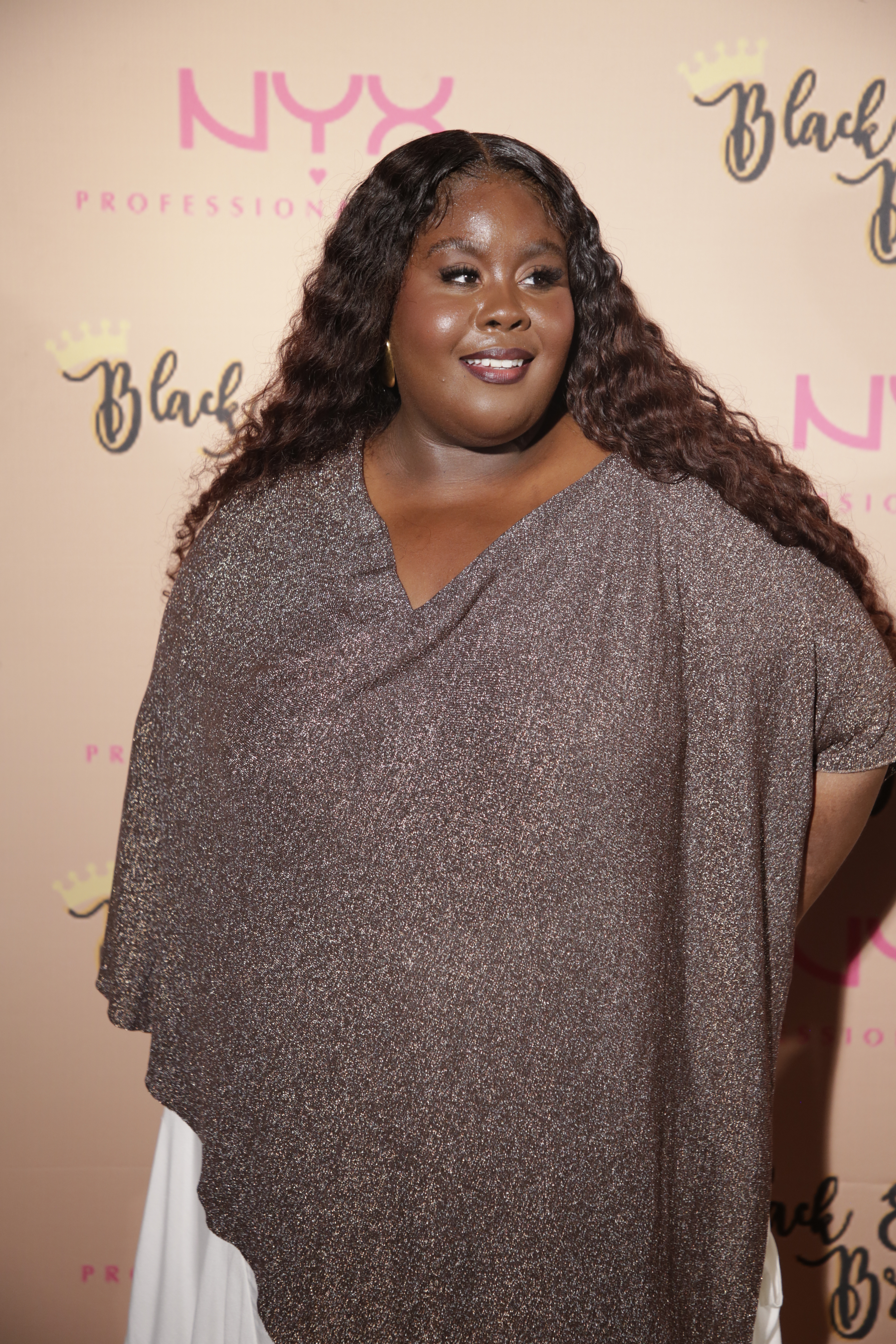
- Goodwin at Black Excellence Brunch 2026
- Occupation: Actress
- Years active: 2001–present
- Children: 2

Raven Goodwin is an American actress. She made her debut with the comedy film Lovely & Amazing (2001), which earned her an Independent Spirit Award nomination, and next received a Screen Actors Guild Award nomination for her role in the drama film The Station Agent. She made her shift to television roles starring in the Nickelodeon comedy series Just Jordan (2007–2008).

In 2010, Goodwin transitioned to mature roles with the series Huge (2010), and subsequently came to mainstream recognition with a recurring role on the sitcom Good Luck Charlie (2010–2014). Her widespread breakthrough came with a leading role on the BET series Being Mary Jane (2013–2019), for which her performance received praise. She has since appeared as Eliza on the comedy series SMILF (2017–2019) and as Denise Clark-Bradford in the television film The Clark Sisters: First Ladies of Gospel (2020), the latter of which earned her a Black Reel Award nomination. She made her return to film with a cameo in the action film Snatched (2017).

== Career ==
=== 2001–2008: Child acting ===
Goodwin began acting in 2001, making her debut with the comedy drama film Lovely & Amazing, starring as Annie Marks. Goodwin's performance was praised, leading her to receive a number of award nominations for the role, of which includes a Black Reel Award nomination and an Independent Spirit Award. The New York Times wrote on her performance that "Of the three daughters, Annie (Goodwin) seems the most grounded", and Empire magazine named Goodwin a "stand-out" of the film.

In 2003, Goodwin was cast in Tom McCarthy's independent comedy-drama The Station Agent as Cleo. Filmed over a strain of time in the same year, The Station Agent and the performances of the ensemble were acclaimed upon release. She earned a Screen Actors Guild Award nomination for the role, which ranks her among the youngest actresses to be nominated. On Goodwin's acting, Roger Ebert, who previously reviewed Lovely & Amazing, said that she "like (Peter) Dinklage, has a particular and unshakable presence on the screen, and I hope the movies do not misplace her, as they do so many child actors."

In 2004, Goodwin began working on television, making guest appearances on various shows, of which include the sitcom Malcolm in the Middle, and the television series Strong Medicine and Everybody Hates Chris. In 2006, Goodwin appeared in the critically panned comedy film Phat Girlz as Young Jazmin Biltmore. Goodwin landed the main role of Tangie Cunningham on Nickelodeon sitcom Just Jordan, which began airing in 2007, running for two seasons.

=== 2009–present: Mainstream breakthrough ===
In 2010, Goodwin was cast in the main role of Becca in the sitcom Huge, which ran for a season. The show averaged roughly a million viewers per episode. Later that year, Goodwin was cast as the recurring role of Ivy Wentz in Disney Channel sitcom Good Luck Charlie. Following this, Goodwin played the role of Sheila on Fox's comedy drama Glee for three episodes, and appeared as Desiree in American sitcom New Girl. Her role on Good Luck Charlie earned particular praise.

In 2013, Goodwin was cast in the main role of Niecy Patterson, the niece of Gabrielle Union's character, in the American drama series Being Mary Jane, which she played until the show ended in 2019. Being Mary Jane polarized critics and audiences, and broke records for the BET network, and gave Goodwin recognition in mature roles. On the transition from Disney, she said that "it was very necessary. At one point I was doing Disney and Being Mary Jane at the same time. But it still felt natural. It still felt organic." She played the role until 2019, a period of time in which she sporadically took television and film roles.

In 2017, she was cast in the role of Eliza in the American television program SMILF; she was initially set to portray a recurring role, though she was promoted to a series regular for the show's second season. The series ran for 2 years, and was cancelled following several misconduct allegations made by SMILF's cast and crew against Frankie Shaw. In spite of this, SMILF obtained widespread acclaim throughout its run, and received a Golden Globe Award nomination. Goodwin had a minor role in the 2017 action-comedy film Snatched as Lew.

In 2019, Goodwin starred in the BET television film Christmas Belles. In the same year, she was cast as Denise Clark-Bradford in the Lifetime television film The Clark Sisters: First Ladies of Gospel. Released in 2020, the feature was Lifetime's most-watched in four years, and Goodwin's acting was lauded by critics; she received a nomination for another Black Reel Award.

In January 2021, Goodwin was cast as actress Hattie McDaniel in the independent biographical film Behind the Smile. On being cast in the role, Goodwin stated that "I am forever honored. I look forward to bringing this important historical and relevant life story to the screen." As of June 2026, the film has not been released. In August 2021, Goodwin began playing the recurring character of Josephine on the drama series Our Kind of People.

She starred as co lead Monica Harris in the Lifetime (TV channel) trilogy Single Black Female, Single Black Female 2: Simone's Revenge (2024) and Single Black Female 3: The Final Chapter (2025). The first film was released on February 5, 2022, and was the most viewed Lifetime original film since Wendy Williams: The Movie (2021)

She portrays Dr Brooklyn Boyer--the daughter of Kimberly Reece and Spencer Boyer-- on the reboot A Different World (2026 TV series).

== Personal life ==
Goodwin announced her engagement to business executive Wiley Battle through Instagram, which was picked up across various media outlets. They have since married. She has two children.

== Filmography ==
=== Film ===
Year	Title	Role	Notes
2001	Lovely & Amazing	Annie Marks	
2003	The Station Agent	Cleo	
2006	Phat Girlz	Young Jazmin Biltmore	
2007	All About Us	DJ	
2008	My Genie	Princene "Princess" Gingi	
2017	Snatched	Lew	
2024	Lola	Babina	
TBA	Behind the Smile	Hattie McDaniel	Upcoming film

=== Television ===
Year	Title	Role	Notes
2004	Malcolm in the Middle	Special Kid # 2	Episode: "Dewey's Special Class"
2005	Strong Medicine	Tara	Episode: "Infectious Love"
2006	Everybody Hates Chris	Tangee	Episode: "Everybody Hates Valentine's Day"
2006	All of Us	Courtney	2 episodes
2006	Just a Phase	Crystal	Unsold television film
2007–2008	Just Jordan	Tangie Cunningham	Main role
2008	30 Rock	Pam	Episode: "Believe in the Stars"
2010	Huge	Rebecca "Becca" Huffstatter	Main role
2010–2014	Good Luck Charlie	Ivy Wentz	Recurring role
2010	Meet the Browns	Rose Watkins	Episode: "Meet the Trainer"
2011	Glee	Sheila	3 episodes
2011	New Girl	Desiree	Episode: "Bells"
2011	Good Luck Charlie, It's Christmas!	Ivy Wentz	Television film
2013–2019	Being Mary Jane	Niecy Patterson	Main role
2017–2019	SMILF	Eliza	Recurring (season 1), main role (season 2)
2019	Christmas Belles	Delia	Television film
2020	The Clark Sisters: First Ladies of Gospel	Denise Clark Bradford	Lifetime movie
2021	Our Kind of People	Josephine	Recurring role
2022	Single Black Female	Monica Harris	Television film
2022–present	Abbott Elementary	Krystal	3 Episodes
2024	Single Black Female 2: Simone's Revenge	Monica Harris	Television film
2024	Grotesquerie	Merritt Tryon	Main role
2024	Style Me for Christmas	Tiffany	Television film
2025	Single Black Female 3: The Final Chapter	Monica Harris	Television film
2026	The Real Housewives of Atlanta	Herself	Episode: "Rebels & Outlaws"

== Awards and nominations ==
Year	Award	Category	Work	Result	Ref.
2003	Black Reel Awards	Outstanding Breakthrough Performance	Lovely & Amazing	Nominated	
2003	Independent Spirit Awards	Best Breakthrough Performance	Lovely & Amazing	Nominated	
2003	OTA Film Awards	Best Film Performance	Lovely & Amazing	Nominated	
2004	Phoenix Film Critics Society Awards	Best Ensemble Acting (shared with cast)	The Station Agent	Nominated	
2004	Screen Actors Guild Awards	Outstanding Performance by a Cast in a Motion Picture (shared with cast)	The Station Agent	Nominated	
2020	Black Reel Awards	Outstanding Supporting Actress in a TV Movie or Limited Series	The Clark Sisters: First Ladies of Gospel	Nominated	
