= Trell Thomas =

American founder and activist

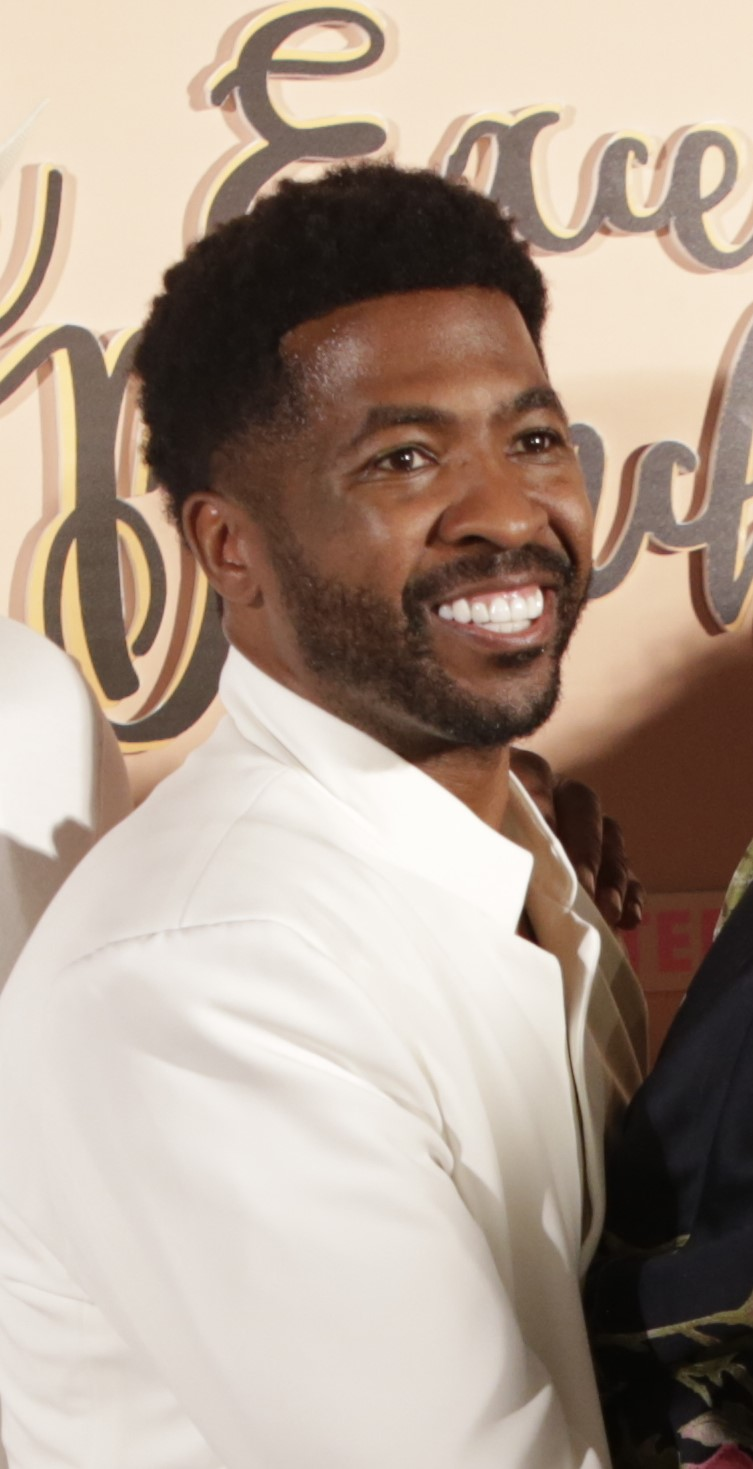
- Thomas at Black Excellence Brunch 2026.
- Occupations: Founder, activist
- Known for: Black Excellence Brunch

Trell Thomas is an American founder and activist. In 2018, he founded the Black Excellence Brunch, a meeting event which brings members of the Black community together to honor its achievements and discuss its relevant concerns.

== Career ==
Thomas spent many years working in the entertainment industry. In 2018, he founded the Black Excellence Brunch after being inspired by a dining event he hosted in New York City in anticipation of his move to Los Angeles. Through nationwide events with members of the Black community, he sought to replicate the tradition of Sunday dinners after church which frequently occurred during his childhood in South Carolina. Thomas has organized such events at Disney, the Toronto International Film Festival, and the White House, among many others.
