= Single Black Female =

2022 television film by Shari L. Carpenter

- Promotional poster
- Inspired by: Single White Female by Don Roos
- Written by: Sa'Rah Jones; Tessa Evelyn Scott
- Directed by: Shari L. Carpenter
- Starring: Amber Riley; Raven Goodwin; K. Michelle
- Country of origin: United States
- Original language: English

Production
- Producer: Gingi Rochelle
- Editor: David Impicciatore
- Running time: 85 minutes

Original release
- Network: Lifetime
- Release: February 5, 2022

Single Black Female is a 2022 thriller television film directed by Shari L. Carpenter and written by Sa'Rah L. Jones and Tessa Evelyn Scott. Starring Amber Riley, Raven Goodwin, and K. Michelle, it is inspired by the 1992 film Single White Female. The film was released on February 5, 2022, and was the most viewed Lifetime original film since Wendy Williams: The Movie (2021).

The film was followed by two sequels Single Black Female 2: Simone's Revenge (2024) and Single Black Female 3: The Final Chapter (2025).

== Plot ==
Monica Harris, looks on, deep in a reverie of her as a child playing with her father. Her friend Bebe approaches bringing her back to reality. Donning all black, it is revealed Monica's father has died, offscreen, and they are now at his funeral. While eulogizing her father a man, soon revealed to be her boyfriend that does erectile dysfunction commercials as an occupation, interrupts her heartfelt eulogy when his cell phone goes off loudly. Annoyed with this outburst the entire audience looks at him sharply, especially Monica's mother, he whispers sorry and she continues on as a mysterious woman wearing a black veil makes her exit.

Now back at the repast, Andre suggests some grief sex should lift Monica's spirit. Instantly turned off by this, she reminds him why she is sad. Monica’s mother says that she wished Monica would have mentioned the philanthropy her father did while he was alive, showing the tension between the two and Monica's feelings of falling short in her mother's eyes. Her friend Bebe expresses interest in a much older gentleman and expresses her fear of being alone. Being a great friend Monica reassures her that she will be there for Bebe and shares more on how difficult her relationship is with her mom and wishing she had the support her father gave her, from her mother. Andre joins them causing for Bebe to make an inappropriate comment and exit the conversation. They laugh as she thanks him for being there for her fathers service and repast.

Shortly after, Monica is seen packing things in a box labeled ‘Andre's Stuff’ seemingly upbeat and motivated while doing so. While locking her front door she sees her neighbor, Mrs. Fletcher, who walks with her flask and openly drinks at anytime. Mrs. Fletcher asks Monica sarcastically, “where’d you hide the body” as they laugh about Andres belongings fitting in one box, still Monica shows concern and offers to come over and cook her a real breakfast to which, Mrs. Fletcher declines because she does not allow visitors in her home and is very private.

At lunch with Bebe, Monica shares that she and Andre have broken up. Shocked, Bebe asks for more information to which Monica tells Bee she received a DM of Andre having sex with another woman in a club. Bebe, being her typical inappropriate self, asks to see the photo and Monica declines. She lets Bee know that she is not sad about the breakup and is moving forward.

We now see Monica in her professional setting, a Houston-based television host. Her cohost Elodie Price, expresses how happy she is to have Monica back and gains a compliment from the esteemed Rochelle Clark, to which they giggle and discuss their ambitions at the station and promise one another not to let any progress they make cost them their friendship. As Elodie walks away a sound guy approaches Monica, noticeably taken aback, she mentions how he is new but he rebuttals saying he has worked there over a year and he too is looking to get promoted. Introducing himself as the new floor director, while taking her mic, Eric shakes her hand as their conversation abruptly ends as she shifts her attention to Jeff, asking how she can get the newly open host spot on the show Tea Time.

Jeff tells her that her work ethic alone should make her a shoo-in and how she is a star but how the same could be said about Elodie. She humbly agrees about this and Jeff quips how her humility will cost her that job and to be more assertive, advising how the higher ups need to see that she is up to the tasks presented. He then tells her that her assistant Nate, has quit and that they found a replacement without getting Monica's input. Jeff assures her she will love her new assistant and if not she can fire her as he takes her to be introduced to Simone. Almost star struck and too lost for words, Simone just stares at Monica until Monica breaks the ice. Jeff comments on just how closely Monica and Simone resemble one another. Seemingly validated by this, Simone happily accepts this as a compliment.

Monica takes Simone to her workspace as Simone gushes over Monica, even saying how much better Monica is than Elodie. Unfazed by the praise and the obvious obsession Simone has for her, Monica remains aloof prompting Simone to ask if she did something wrong. Monica assures her no and invites her to tell her more about who she is, than about Monica herself. Simone says how she does not have much to tell and how she came to Houston from Virginia two weeks prior. She shares that she has distant family in the state and hopes they can reconnect. Just then, Monica receives a call from her ex, Andre, whose call she ignores and gives Simone the rest of the day off. Simone, still eager to start, accepts tomorrow as her official start date and leaves but not before quoting Monica's father, leaving Monica perplexed.

Waiting for the elevator Simone admires a picture of Monica hanging in the hall, the doors open and Eric introduces himself and nicknames Simone ‘first day’ as the pair share a laugh. Getting off on the wrong floor Simone runs into Elodie who does not know who she is and comfortably bad mouths Monica, in front of Simone, while on the phone.

Simone arrives to a recognizable door and rings the bell. The antisocial Mrs. Fletcher comes out refusing to take in a stranger let alone the pleading Simone until Simone pulls out a rubber banded wad of hundred dollar bills, seemingly changing Mrs. Fletchers mind.

Upset about the breakup, Andre meets with Monica at her job parking lot for his belongings, where they argue and Andre alleges the photo is not him. Further annoying Monica and confirming she made the right decision by ending things. Heading home she runs into Simone coming out of Mrs. Fletchers home. Naturally questioning what she is doing there to which Simone is very forthcoming, even telling her that Mrs. Fletcher is gone out of town for a few weeks and they can grab a bottle of liquor from her vast collection. Monica obliges and the two get to know one another over drinks. However, Simone begins displaying some signs of jealousy over Monica's friendship with Bebe.

Simone shifts her attention to a picture of Monica's dad. Recognizing him as a former mayor who she has read about, but asks Monica more. Rebutting Monica's claims that her father was perfect by saying over time she learns no one is perfect. An emotional Monica cries as she defends her father overwhelmed with tears. Simone rushes in to console her, seeing Bebe calling and sending it to ignore.

Monica awakes the next morning to Simone wearing her New Edition T-shirt and cooking her breakfast. Puzzled by this Monica asks how she got into her apartment. Simone assures Monica that she looked after her after she became emotional while they were drinking last night and that they should get ready for work. Monica offers Simone some of her old wardrobe further feeding Simones obsession with Monica, who practices posing and speaking like Monica.

At work Monica is more seriously pursuing the host position, even having a back and forth with Elodie in front of Rochelle Clark, who encouraged the two that that is what the network wants to see, feistiness. Surprised by Elodie breaking their promise they made to one another, Monica argues with Elodie, showing Elodies true intentions. Simone watches from a distance watching it all unfold. Shortly after Elodie is attacked while walking to her car. Creating an opportunity for Monica to host the show solo for the first time. Instead Monica opted not to film live as they used the day to wish Elodie well and as a mental health day.

Eric finally works up the nerve to ask Monica out, after her ex asks Eric to deliver flowers to Monica. Simone learns of this when Monica has to raincheck their plans because of her date, noticeably upsetting Simone, who was under the impression Eric was attracted to her. Seeing him in the elevator after having an episode, she corners him and tells him she is great at many things, leaving him shaken.

While dropping off Monica's dry-cleaning, Simone tries on a dress Monica nearly mistakenly gave her, but took back once realizing it was a dress her father bought her. Simone seizes this opportunity to try on the dress, knowing Monica is out with Eric. Suddenly the pair arrive back home in a heated moment of passion, kissing and undressing. Simone watches clandestinely and becomes aroused, causing her to masturbate at the sight of them having sex. Simone attempts to sneak out of Monica's house while she and Eric are sleeping but Monica catches her right as she is exiting the front door. She tells Monica she forgot to leave her keys when she dropped off her dry-cleaning earlier.

The next morning at work Simone intensely questions how Eric's date with Monica went and warns him not to sleep with Monica because she is too vulnerable from her recent breakup to make sound decisions. The next time Monica sees Eric, he is very cold and distant towards her, making her question if she did anything wrong.

The same day Simone calls and asks if she could come in late because the distant relative she mentioned in the past is reaching out. Monica gives her the day off wishing her luck with her meeting. Arriving in a posh restaurant, Simone meets with Denise, whose name was not revealed yet, for their meeting. Denise pays her off and warns her to stay away from her daughter, Monica. As Denise leaves abruptly, Simone screams, scaring everyone in the restaurant.

Once more Monica attempts to find out what happened to make Eric cold towards her to which he replies, Simone. Just as this is revealed Simone shows up to Denise's mansion, unafraid and unfazed, Denise opens her door as they have a quick back and forth ending with Simone warning her and showing the contents of her bookbag, Mrs. Fletcher's severed head.

Monica angrily goes next door to confront Simone over the things she said to Eric but Simone is not there. Monica breaks into Mrs. Fletchers house discovering an unkempt, foul smelling home. She continues through the home and finds her red dress that her father bought her and a DVD from Andre, who never could explain or believe what happened to him the night he cheated on Monica. She goes home to watch the DVD and sees Simone enticing Andre and spiking his drink. Calling Bebe from the office, Monica tells her how she now knows she cannot trust Simone just as Simone arrives.

Monica confronts Simone with the truth, leaving Simone no room to explain and firing her. As Monica is leaving her office she is met with Simone waiting for her by her car. She drugs Monica and holds her hostage. When Monica comes to she sees that Simone has also taken her mother hostage. Simone explains that she and Monica are sisters and she met their father before he died. She also reveals she killed him by drugging his drink. Monica keeps her talking as Bebe sneaks up behind her, hitting her in the head with a vase. Bebe releases Monica and Denise from their bonds as they run to escape. Bebe and Simone begin fighting ending with a seemingly fatal blow to Bebe. Believing this to be the end of the fight Simone takes off in search of Monica who impales her with a metal pipe, telling her that is for taking her father from her.

Now the solo host of Tea Time, Monica is shooting her first episode as a sour Elodie reluctantly applauds. Denise and Eric cheer her on as she dedicates her first episode to Bebe, who is bandaged up but well and in a relationship.

== Cast ==
- Amber Riley as Simone Hicks
- Raven Goodwin as Monica Harris
- K. Michelle as Bebe Morgan, Monica's best friend
- Janet Hubert as Denise Harris, Monica's mother
- Devale Ellis as Eric
- Kron Moore as Clarke Michelle

== Production ==
On October 29, 2021, it was announced that Lifetime ordered Single Black Female written by Sa'Rah L. Jones and Tessa Evelyn Scott with director Shari L. Carpenter. The film's story is inspired by the 1992 film Single White Female starring Bridget Fonda and Jennifer Jason Leigh.

Amber Riley and Raven Goodwin were approached to star as co-leads in part because they are frequently mistaken for each other. The film was shot in Atlanta, Georgia.

== Release ==
Single Black Female premiered on Lifetime on February 5, 2022.

The film was watched by 5.1 million viewers on-air and online and was the most-watched original movie of the year across all telecasts.

== Sequels ==
In 2024, a sequel was released called Single Black Female 2: Simone's Revenge. In 2025, it was followed by the final film called Single Black Female 3: The Final Chapter.
