= Divorced Sistas =

American comedy drama television series

- Also known as: Tyler Perry's Divorced Sistas
- Genre: Comedy drama; Romance; Thriller; Crime; Soap opera
- Created by: Tyler Perry
- Written by: Tyler Perry
- Directed by: Tyler Perry
- Starring: LeToya Luckett; Khadeen Indréa; Porscha Coleman; Briana Price; Jennifer Sears; RonReaco Lee; DeVon Franklin; Donovan Christie Jr.; Robert Christopher Riley; Michael Bolwaire
- Country of origin: United States
- Original language: English
- No. of seasons: 1
- No. of episodes: 16

Production
- Executive producers: Tyler Perry; Devale Ellis; Crystal Renee Hayslett; Mark E. Swinton; LeToya Luckett
- Producers: Khadeen Ellis (Andrea); Carmen K. Jones; Andy Norman; David Joseph; Colette S. Knight; David Joseph; Chido Nwokocha; KJ Smith; Asante White; DeVon Franklin; Carole Wurst; Angi Bones; Will Areu; Nadia Brown; Tony L. Strickland
- Camera setup: Single
- Production company: Tyler Perry Studios

Original release
- Network: BET+
- Release: June 10 – July 24, 2025
- Network: Paramount+
- Release: April 15, 2026 – present

Related
- Sistas

Divorced Sistas is an American comedy drama television series created and produced by Tyler Perry and starring LeToya Luckett. It is a spin-off of BET comedy drama Sistas and premiered on BET, BET Her, and VH1 on June 9, 2025; and on BET+ on June 10, 2025. On April 7, 2026, Tyler Perry announced via Facebook that the second half of season 1 would be premiering exclusively on Paramount+ on April 15, as BET+ would be merging on the service later in June 2026. The first season concluded on May 27, 2026.

In August 2026, the series was renewed for a second and third season.

== Plot ==
Per the streamer's official description: "Divorced Sistas follows five close friends — Rasheda, Geneva, Naomi, Tiffany, and Bridgette — as they navigate life, love, and the challenges that come with divorce, marriage, and dating."

== Cast and characters ==
- LeToya Luckett as Rasheda
- Khadeen Indréa as Geneva
- Porscha Coleman as Naomi
- Briana Price as Tiffany
- Jennifer Sears as Bridgette
- RonReaco Lee as William
- DeVon Franklin as Pastor Jeff
- Donovan Christie Jr. as Franklin
- Robert Christopher Riley as Javon
- Michael Bolwaire as Hakeem

== Episodes ==
No.	Title	Directed by	Written by	Original release date
Part 1
1	"The Pretty Lady"	Tyler Perry	Tyler Perry	June 10, 2025
2	"Old Flames, New Scars"	Tyler Perry	Tyler Perry	June 12, 2025
3	"Hushed Tones"	Tyler Perry	Tyler Perry	June 19, 2025
4	"Line in the Sand"	Tyler Perry	Tyler Perry	June 26, 2025
5	"Breath of Fresh Air"	Tyler Perry	Tyler Perry	July 3, 2025
6	"Heavier Than Words"	Tyler Perry	Tyler Perry	July 10, 2025
7	"Brutal Honesty"	Tyler Perry	Tyler Perry	July 17, 2025
8	"Birds of a Feather"	Tyler Perry	Tyler Perry	July 24, 2025
Part 2
9	"Lies in Disguise"	Tyler Perry	Tyler Perry	April 15, 2026
10	"A Little Grace"	Tyler Perry	Tyler Perry	April 15, 2026
11	"Dangerous Games"	Tyler Perry	Tyler Perry	April 22, 2026
12	"Disappearing Act"	Tyler Perry	Tyler Perry	April 29, 2026
13	"Beyond Redemption"	Tyler Perry	Tyler Perry	May 6, 2026
14	"Honesty Hour"	Tyler Perry	Tyler Perry	May 13, 2026
15	"Seeing Red"	Tyler Perry	Tyler Perry	May 20, 2026
16	"Author Of Confusion"	Tyler Perry	Tyler Perry	May 27, 2026
