= Man on Fire (The Vampire Diaries) =

- The Vampire Diaries episode
- Episode no.: Season 5 Episode 19
- Directed by: Michael Allowitz
- Written by: Melinda Hsu Taylor; Matthew D'Ambrosio
- Production code: 2J7519
- Original air date: April 24, 2014

Guest appearances
- Marguerite MacIntyre (Elizabeth Forbes); Michael Malarkey (Enzo); Raffi Barsoumian (Markos); Caitlin McHugh (Sloan); Penelope Mitchell (Liv Parker); Heather Hemmens (Maggie James); Chris Brochu (Luke Parker)

Episode chronology
← Previous "Resident Evil"	Next → "What Lies Beneath"
- The Vampire Diaries season 5

"Man on Fire" is the 19th episode of the fifth season of the American series The Vampire Diaries and the series' 108th episode overall. "Man on Fire" was originally aired on April 24, 2014, on The CW. The episode was written by Melinda Hsu Taylor and Matthew D'Ambrosio and directed by Michael Allowitz.

== Plot ==
Stefan (Paul Wesley) tries to keep Elena (Nina Dobrev) busy by helping her study so she will not think of Damon (Ian Somerhalder), after he told her that he does not want to see her again. Bonnie (Kat Graham) joins them at the library and Stefan and Elena notice that despite the fact that she might die soon since the Other Side is falling apart, Bonnie is acting like nothing is happening. Their discussion gets interrupted by Enzo (Michael Malarkey), who comes wanting revenge on Stefan for killing his true love, Maggie (Heather Hemmens). Stefan denies that he was the one who did it despite Enzo showing him a picture of Maggie as a proof that she was killed by "the Ripper". Stefan denies it, since during that period, he was not "the Ripper", but Enzo does not believe him.

Damon looks for the traveler's knife and goes to Matt's (Zach Roerig) place to ask for it. Matt and Jeremy (Steven R. McQueen) are also looking for it all over the house and cannot find it. They tell Damon that Tyler (Michael Trevino) told them it was in the house but they did not hear from him since then. Damon puts the pieces together and realizes that Tyler must have been possessed by the Travelers. He calls Enzo for help but Enzo tells him that he is with Stefan and Elena and that he is about to kill Stefan because he was the one who murdered Maggie. Damon tries to tell him that this is not possible because Stefan was not "the Ripper" during the '60s, but Enzo does not want to hear him.

Enzo uses the help of Liv (Penelope Mitchell) to cause pain to Elena and Stefan to make him admit his actions. Bonnie asks her to stop but she cannot because if she doesn't do whatever Enzo wants, he will kill her brother Luke (Chris Brochu), who Enzo keeps hostage. Stefan keeps denying that he had anything to do with Maggie's death, so Enzo threatens to kill Bonnie. To save her life, Stefan admits that he did kill Maggie. Through flashbacks we see that Stefan and Maggie met and Maggie recognized him as one of the Salvatore brothers and asked him to tell her where Damon is so she can kill him. Maggie, who didn't know that Wes saved Enzo, believed that Damon was responsible for Enzo's death in the fire and wanted to revenge his death.

In the meantime, Damon asks Liz' (Marguerite MacIntyre) help to find out more about Maggie and her death. Liz, having the date of the murder, finds the file and brings it to Damon. When Damon sees it, he remembers that he was the one who killed Maggie. Through another flashback, we see that Maggie did find Damon and attempted to kill him, but Damon stopped her, killed her and made it look like it was Stefan. Damon did not know that the woman was Enzo's true love, since she did not give him her name.

Enzo tortures Stefan and Damon gets there in time before he kills him. Damon confesses to Enzo that he was the one who killed Maggie, but did not know who she was and that at the time he had his emotions turned off, so he did many bad things. Stefan asks Damon why he made it look like he did it. Damon answeres that while Maggie was the hope Enzo held onto, Stefan was his, and when he didn’t noticed Damon was missing for five years, Damon hold a grudge towards Stefan. Damon apologizes and tells Enzo he can kill him and hate him if he wants. Enzo does not want to hate Damon because he is the only thing he has left, so he turned off his emotions so he will not care about anything that he does, despite Damon trying to stop him.

Enzo attacks Liv while Damon and Stefan try to stop him, but he runs away taking Elena with him. Damon asks Stefan to help Liv while he goes after Enzo, believing he can help him. Stefan gives Liv some of his blood to save her life and then runs after Enzo as well. Enzo wants to kill Elena because he knows Damon loves and cares about her, but Elena fights back, so he snaps her neck. Stefan gets there in time to stop him before he stakes her and the two of them start to fight.

Damon finds Elena unconscious and takes her home so she will be safe. He leaves her on the couch and leaves. Enzo and Stefan keep fighting and Enzo wants to burn Stefan because he knows that if he does, it will hurt Damon, because he loses his only brother. Stefan puts his hand into Enzo's chest reaching his heart and tells him that he will kill him, because he knows that he will not stop until he kills Damon, but hesitates to do the final move. Enzo changes his mind about killing Stefan and believes that turning the two brothers against each other will be a better way to revenge Damon, so he pulls himself back, leaving Stefan holding his heart and the one responsible for the death of Damon's beat friend.

Stefan decides that it is better not to tell Damon about Enzo's death, so he texts him from Enzo's phone that he is leaving town and then goes to find Elena. Elena wakes up and doesn't know how she got home. Stefan tells her about Enzo and what happened and that he does not want Damon to know. He also calls Bonnie to tell her the same and Bonnie agrees. Enzo appears to her to pass to the Other Side and Bonnie hides the fact that the dead man is Enzo from Jeremy.

In the meantime, the travelers' leader Markos (Raffi Barsoumian) uses Sloan (Caitlin McHugh) who volunteered for their experiment. They want to see if they can remove magic with the doppelganger's blood. Markos uses Tyler's blood to turn Sloan into a vampire. Then Sloan drinks the doppelganger blood they have from Stefan and Elena while the rest of the travelers chant a spell. After a while, they check if the spell worked and if Sloan is no longer a vampire; she is not. Right after, she dies, since the spell brings the person to their last state of being human which was being dead. Markos announces that they now know that the doppelganger blood can reverse the spell of someone being a vampire and they can finally defeat them to make the town their home.

The episode ends with Stefan and Damon talking about Enzo. Damon explains to Stefan that while he was captured by the Augustine it was Enzo that kept him from hating Stefan, when Damon believed that he did not care about him and that is why he did not come to save him. He said Enzo envied him for having a brother. And it was good that they still had people on the outside just living there lives free of their Augustine hell. Damon said that’s why he had to save him, he owes him. While the two brothers talk, we see Enzo being in the room as a ghost and listening to them and seem pleased for the vendetta that is about to start between the two brothers.

== Feature music ==
In the "Man on Fire" episode we can hear the songs:

- "Starlight" by Johnny Angel
- "Poor Little Girl" by Buddy Stewart
- "Ninety Nine Pounds of Dynamite" by Buddy Stewart
- "Locked In a Cage" by Brick and Mortar
- "Breathless" by U.S. Royalty
- "Be What You Be" by Angus Stone

== Reception ==
=== Ratings ===
In its original American broadcast, "Man on Fire" was watched by 1.81 million; up by 0.15 from the previous episode.

=== Reviews ===
"Man on Fire" received mixed reviews.

Carrie Raisler of The A.V. Club gave the episode an A− rating focusing the review on Enzo. "The main reason this episode works so well is that it focuses on Enzo, who is one of the better additions to the Mystic Falls universe in quite some time. [...] it helps that Enzo himself has an interesting backstory. Michael Malarkey plays him with a fire in his belly, infusing him with personality and verve. Enzo has been lurking around in the shadows of most of this season’s stories, but he finally got his very own showcase here, and it was a doozy."

Stephanie Flasher of TV After Dark gave the episode a B rating saying that the episode was very "Denzo-centric". "In summary, [Man on Fire] was an acceptable episode of the hit supernatural show. The writers did a great job showcasing Michael Malarkey’s talents as an actor in this episode. The direction was great too, allowing the audience see the varying sides of Enzo’s character. Ian did a great job alongside Enzo. The writers have done a good job showing Damon’s character development from week to week."

Ashley Dominique of Geeked Out Nation gave the episode a B− rating. "Centered around a situation that should have been filled with tension, everyone in "Man Of Fire" [sic] just seemed to be going through the motions."

Jim Halterman from TV Fanatic rated the episode with 3.5/5 saying: "While tonight’s episode wasn’t perfect by any means - and there was obviously plenty for me to be snarky about - I did enjoy it more than past outings mostly because I feel as though we’re finally heading somewhere and it could be really fun."

Stephanie Hall of K Site TV gave a good review to the episode saying that it served as a setup for the remaining ones. "There were bits and pieces of the season’s overall mythology scattered throughout that prevents this from being a true filler episode, but much of the drama in "Man on Fire" felt drawn out. That’s not to say it wasn’t enjoyable, because it was, just on a more gratuitous level than the convoluted mythology-heavy episodes of the recent past."

Caroline Preece from Den of Geek gave a good review to the episode saying that the strength of Vampire Diaries is in its male relationships and focused on the revenge story between Enzo, Damon and Stefan. "As do Enzo’s actions in 2014 (or whatever year we’re actually in), essentially framing Stefan for his murder and royally screwing up the brothers’ temporary truce. To have them fighting about a lost friendship rather than lost love is more refreshing than it maybe should be for a show essentially about supernatural romance [...] That’s exciting, and should inject future episodes with a bit of drama."

Josie Kafka of Doux Reviews rated the episode with 2.5/4. "TVD has been hit or miss all season, and I wonder if that is just, as they say, the new normal. With some shows, we know to expect mythology episodes interspersed with standalones. With others, we know to expect comedy every now and again, usually right before the big sad. Maybe, with TVD, we can expect a constant 2:1 ratio of good:awkward. Those awkward episodes shift all the pieces on the board, and set us up for the fun and games of the stronger episodes."

Jen of TV Over Mind gave a mixed review to the episode saying that overall it was a frustrating episode. "The Vampire Diaries is known for its complex storylines, but something about this season just feels tired to me. Yes, we learned of the Travelers’ true agenda but even that is still a bit confusing. Flashbacks to the past fill in more of Enzo’s story (which was long overdue) but it all led up to a pointless secret by the end."
