= Porscha Coleman =

American actress, singer, dancer, and TV host

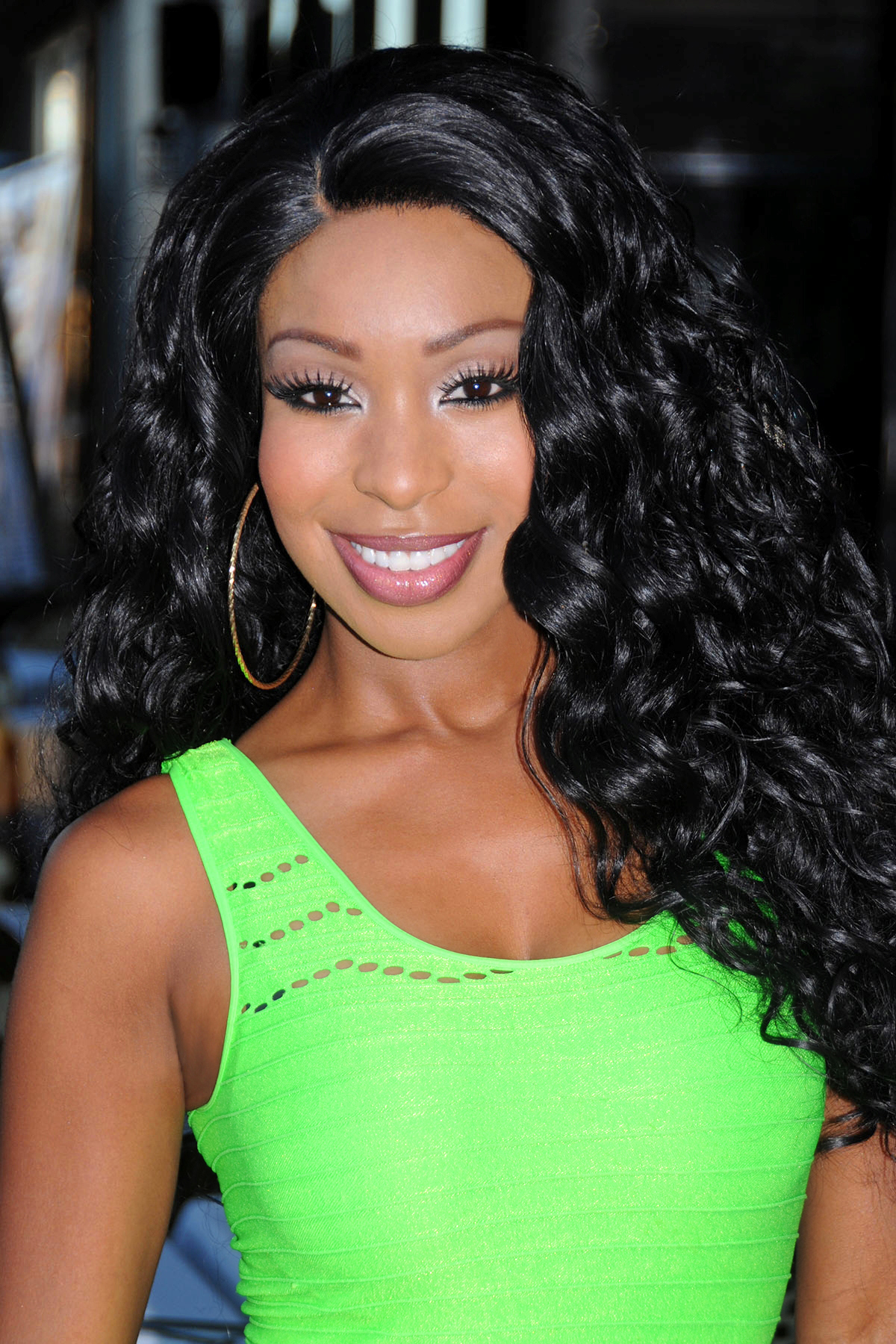
- Porscha Coleman in 2014
- Born: Porscha Lee Coleman
- Occupations: Actress; singer; dancer; TV host
- Years active: 1999–present

Porscha Lee Coleman is an American actress, singer, dancer, and television host. Coleman is best known for her being the Co-Host on the Hollywood Today Live (2013–2015) and her main role as Chelsea Dixon on Netflix's sitcom Dad Stop Embarrassing Me! (2021).

== Filmography ==
=== Film ===
| Year | Title | Role | Notes | |
|---|---|---|---|---|
| 1995 | Friday | Little Girl by the Ice Cream truck (Uncredited) | movie | |
| 1995 | 2004 | Pixel Perfect | Rachel | TV movie |
| Woman Thou Art Loosed | 2004 | Lil' Bit | | |
| 2006 | Dr. Dolittle 3 | Singer (voice) | Video | |
| 2006 | Holy Fit | Patricia | Short | |
| 2009 | Janky Promoters | Dancer #1/Sandra | | |
| 2012 | Christmas in Compton | Kendra Campbell | | |
| 2017 | You Can't Fight Christmas | Belinda King | | |
| 2018 | Gangland: The Musical | Kayla | | |
| 2022 | Maneater | Sunny | | |
| 2022 | The Christmas Clapback | Tisha | | |
| 2022 | A Miracle Before Christmas | Faith | | |
| 2024 | Too Many Christmases | Kayla | | |
| TBA | All-Star Weekend † | TBA | Completed | |

=== Television ===
| Year | Title | Role | Notes |
|---|---|---|---|
| 1999 | The Gregory Hines Show | Christy | Episode: "Get Smarter" |
| 1999 | NYPD Blue | Tonya | Episode: "What's Up, Chuck?" |
| 2000 | Touched by an Angel | Renee | Episode: "God Bless the Child" |
| 2001 | Great Pretenders | Herself | Episode: "Episode #2.26" |
| 2001 | The Geena Davis Show | Sandy | Recurring Cast |
| 2001 | The Ellen Show | Kid #1 | Episode: "Missing the Bus" |
| 2002 | My Wife and Kids | Shaneka | Episode: "Samba Story" |
| 2002 | The Jersey | Vanessa Gilpin | Episode: "Coleman's Big Date" |
| 2002–03 | Boston Public | Sheila Pepper | Recurring Cast: Season 3 |
| 2003 | The Parkers | Erica Willis | Recurring Cast: Season 5 |
| 2004 | 10-8: Officers on Duty | Kim Nash | Episode: "Love Don't Love Nobody" |
| 2004 | Eve | Lisa | Episode: "Above Average Joe" |
| 2004–05 | 7th Heaven | Angela | Recurring Cast: Season 9 |
| 2005 | Bones | Female Dancer #1 | Episode: "The Man in the Wall" |
| 2006 | Entourage | Video Ho #1 | Episode: "I Wanna Be Sedated" |
| 2006 | Misconceptions | Sales Clerk | Episode: "Bad Guy's Day Off" |
| 2006–07 | Las Vegas | Dancer #2 | Guest Cast: Season 3 & 5 |
| 2007 | Wild 'N Out | Herself | Episode: "Episode #4.7" & "#4.13" |
| 2007 | Room 401 | Herself | Episode: "Just a Trim" |
| 2009 | The Claudia Jordan Show and Friends | Herself/Co-Host | Main Co-Host |
| 2010 | The League | Camille | Episode: "The Expert Witness" |
| 2010–13 | Maury | Herself/Guest Host | Recurring Guest Host |
| 2011 | The Closer | Dancer #3 | Episode: "Unknown Trouble" |
| 2012 | New Girl | Blade | Episode: "Bathtub" |
| 2013 | The Hustle | Danielle | Episode: "Worst Comes to Worst My Peoples" |
| 2013–15 | Hollywood Today Live | Herself/Co-Host | Main Co-Host |
| 2014 | The Soup | Herself | Episode: "Episode #11.33" |
| 2014 | Silicon Valley | Mochachino | Episode: "The Cap Table" |
| 2015 | Dish Nation | Herself/Host | Episode: "September 11, 2015" |
| 2015 | Switched at Birth | Georgia | Episode: "The Accommodations of Desire" |
| 2019 | Last Call | Sierra | Episode: "Loose Lips" |
| 2019 | Ballers | Regina | Episode: "Copernicursed" |
| 2019 | In the Cut | Tracey | Episode: "America's Got Skillz, Part 2" |
| 2020 | Good Girls | Mindy | Recurring Cast: Season 3 |
| 2021 | Paradise City | Gloria | Recurring Cast |
| 2021 | Dad Stop Embarrassing Me! | Chelsea Dixon | Main Cast |
| 2022–23 | Gown and Out in Beverly Hills | Herself | Guest Cast: Season 3–4 |
| 2023 | Head Over Hill | Lauren Thomas | Main Cast |
| 2023–24 | All American: Homecoming | Crystal | Guest Cast: Season 2–3 |
| 2024 | Alexanderthetitan | Lauren | Episode: "Da Shadow" |
| 2025–present | Divorced Sistas | Naomi | Main Cast |
| 2025 | Power Book IV: Force | Jade | Episode: "Lines in the Sand" |

=== Music videos ===
| Year | Title | Artist | Role |
|---|---|---|---|
| 2006 | "Cupid's Chokehold" | Gym Class Heroes featuring Patrick Stump | Girlfriend #1 |
| 2007 | "Get Buck in Here" | DJ Felli Fel featuring Diddy, Akon, Ludacris and Lil Jon | Herself |
| 2010 | "Got Your Back" | T.I. featuring Keri Hilson | Herself |
| 2015 | "She Keeps Me Up" | Nickelback | Herself |

=== Video game ===
| Year | Title | Role | Ref. |
|---|---|---|---|
| 2022 | Anthem | Jani/Narrator (voice) | |
