= Khadeen Ellis =

American media personality (born 1983)

- Born: Khadeen Indréa Joseph; December 5, 1983 (age 42); Brooklyn, New York City, U.S.
- Occupations: Actress; author; podcast host; producer
- Known for: Tyler Perry's Divorced Sistas
- Spouse: Devale Ellis
- Children: 4
- Beauty pageant titleholder
- Title: Miss New York Teen USA 2002 (1st Runner-Up); Miss New York Teen USA 2001 (finalist); Miss New York Pre-Teen (Winner)

Khadeen Ellis (née Indréa; born December 5, 1983) is an American actress, author, podcast host, producer, media personality and former beauty queen. She is known for co-hosting the podcast Dead Ass with Khadeen and Devale Ellis with Devale Ellis, which later became Ellis Ever After, And for her role as Geneva in the Divorced Sistas.

== Life and career ==
Khadeen Indréa Joseph was born on December 5, 1983, in Brooklyn, New York City. To Morrison Joseph. Khadeen came from a Caribbean family background and grew up in Canarsie. She started participating in pageants at the age of 10 after she became interested in television shows. She competed in Miss New York and later held the titles of Miss New York Pre-Teen and Miss New York Senior Teen. She participated as a contestant in the Miss New York Teen USA Pageant, becoming a finalist in 2001 and emerging as the third runner-up in 2002, and she competed in the national pageant. She continued participating in pageants until the age of 19.

After considering an interest in nursing, Joseph pursued communications and attended Hofstra University. She graduated from Hofstra with both a Bachelors in Broadcast Journalism and a Masters in Speech Communication, Rhetorical Studies and Performance.

Khadeen began her media career as a television host and later appeared with her husband, Devale Ellis, on OWN's docuseries Black Love. In 2019, Ellis and Devale started the podcast Dead Ass with Khadeen and Devale Ellis.

In 2023 Khadeen released the book We Over Me: The Counterintuitive Approach to Getting Everything You Want from Your Relationship, the book discusses her approach to marriage and relationships and became a New York Times bestseller.

As an actress, Khadeen appeared in A Piece of Me: An Everyday Story (2016), Makeup X Breakup (2019), Bruh (2020), and The Business of Christmas (2020).

In 2025, she was cast as Geneva in Tyler Perry's Divorced Sistas.

== Filmography ==
=== Film ===
Year	Title	Role
2016	A Piece of Me: An Everyday Story	Maxine King
2020	The Business of Christmas	Cyndi

=== Television ===
Year	Title	Role	Notes
2019	Makeup X Breakup	Ronnie	4 episodes
2020	Bruh	Jaclie	1 episode
2025–2026	Divorced Sistas	Geneva	16 episodes; spin-off of Sistas

== Bibliography ==
- Ellis, Devale; Ellis, Khadeen (2023). We Over Me: The Counterintuitive Approach to Getting Everything You Want from Your Relationship. Blackstone Audio. ISBN 979-8217069118.
- Ellis, Khadeen; Ellis, Devale; Taylor, K.C. (2020). The Ellises and The Time Machine: Why Do We Have to Say "Black Lives Matter?". Self-published. ISBN 978-1736108260.

== Awards and nominations ==
Awards and nominations for Khadeen Indréa
Year	Ceremony	Category	Result	Ref.
2020	Webby Award	Podcasts – General Series, Diversity & Inclusion	Won	
