= Dad Stop Embarrassing Me! =

2021 American sitcom streaming television series

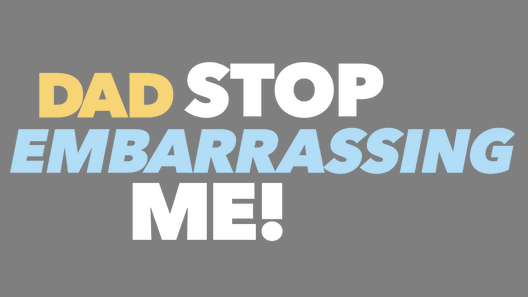
- Genre: Television sitcom
- Created by: Jamie Foxx & Jim Patterson
- Starring: Jamie Foxx; David Alan Grier; Kyla-Drew; Porscha Coleman; Jonathan Kite; Heather Hemmens
- Music by: Ainz Brainz Prasad
- Country of origin: United States
- Original language: English
- No. of seasons: 1
- No. of episodes: 8

Production
- Executive producers: Bentley Kyle Evans; Jamie Foxx; Corinne Foxx; Ken Whittingham
- Producers: Alex Avant; Chris Arrington; James Barnett
- Cinematography: Robin J. Strickland; Donald A. Morgan
- Editor: Andy Zall
- Camera setup: Multi-camera
- Running time: 23–27 minutes
- Production company: A Grandma's Hands Production

Original release
- Network: Netflix
- Release: April 14, 2021

Dad Stop Embarrassing Me! is an American comedy television series created by Jamie Foxx and Jim Patterson that premiered on Netflix on April 14, 2021. That June, it was canceled after one season.

== Cast and characters ==
=== Main ===
- Jamie Foxx as Brian Dixon, a single father and businessman based in Atlanta, and Pops' son. He inherited his mother's cosmetics company, BAY Cosmetics.
  - Foxx also plays in one-time episode roles: Rev. Sweet Tee, the local church's reverend; Cadillac Calvin, Brian's uncle and Pops' brother; and Rusty, a bartender
- David Alan Grier as Pops Dixon, Brian's father
- Kyla-Drew as Sasha Dixon, Brian's teenaged daughter who recently moved from Chicago to Atlanta after the death of her mother
- Porscha Coleman as Chelsea Dixon, Brian's sister and Pops' daughter
- Jonathan Kite as Johnny Williams, Brian's best friend who is an Atlanta police officer
- Heather Hemmens as Stacy Collins, Brian's colleague at BAY Cosmetics

=== Recurring ===
- Valente Rodriguez as Manny, Brian's handyman
- Miracle Reigns as Zia Williams, Sasha's best friend and Johnny's daughter

=== Guest ===
- Luenell as Sheila
- Eugene Byrd as Matt Ross
- Jackée Harry as Elizabeth, Pops' sister and Brian's aunt

== Episodes ==
No.	Title	Directed by	Written by	Original release date
1	"#BlackPeopleDontGoToTherapy"	Ken Whittingham	Teleplay by : Jim Patterson and Jamie Foxx & Bentley Kyle Evans; Story by : Jamie Foxx & Jim Patterson	April 14, 2021
2	"#Godastamaste"	Ken Whittingham	Teleplay by : Jesse Jensen; Story by : Jacque Edmonds Cofer & Steve Leff	April 14, 2021
3	"#YeezysAndShrimp"	Ken Whittingham	Teleplay by : Max Searle & Jacque Edmonds Cofer; Story by : Johnny Mack & Jamie Rhonheimer	April 14, 2021
4	"#NipplesOrNuts"	Ken Whittingham	Teleplay by : Steve Leff & Molly Kiernan; Story by : Jim Patterson & Max Searle	April 14, 2021
5	"#TheMotherPucker"	Ken Whittingham	Teleplay by : Johnny Mack & Rachel Livingston; Story by : Jamie Rhonheimer & Max Searle	April 14, 2021
6	"#ThrillaOnTheGrilla"	Ken Whittingham	Teleplay by : Jamie Rhonheimer & Tori Collins; Story by : Jamie Foxx & Corinne Foxx	April 14, 2021
7	"#RichDadWokeDad"	Bentley Kyle Evans	Teleplay by : Jim Patterson & Jesse Jensen; Story by : Steve Leff & Johnny Mack	April 14, 2021
8	"#MaybeItsBAYBelline"	Bentley Kyle Evans	Teleplay by : Bentley Kyle Evans; Story by : Bentley Kyle Evans & Wayne Stamps	April 14, 2021

== Production ==
On September 1, 2020, Netflix gave Dad Stop Embarrassing Me! a series order. The series was created by Jamie Foxx and Jim Patterson who also executive produced it alongside Bentley Kyle Evans and Corinne Foxx with Alex Avant serving as a producer. Ken Whittingham directed six of the eight episodes. It was also announced that Foxx was cast in a starring role alongside Kyla-Drew, David Alan Grier, Porscha Coleman, Jonathan Kite and Heather Hemmens while Valente Rodriguez was cast in a recurring role.

The series was filmed at Sunset Bronson Studios in Hollywood, California, but it is set in Atlanta, Georgia. On June 18, 2021, Netflix canceled the series after one season.

== Release and reception ==
The series was released on April 14, 2021. The review aggregator website Rotten Tomatoes reported an approval rating of 25% based on 12 critic reviews, with an average rating of 4.98/10. The website's critics consensus reads, "Jamie Foxx is funny – sadly, Dad Stop Embarrassing Me! is not." Metacritic gave the series a weighted average score of 49 out of 100 based on 10 critic reviews, indicating "mixed or average reviews".
