= Kron Moore =

American actress and singer

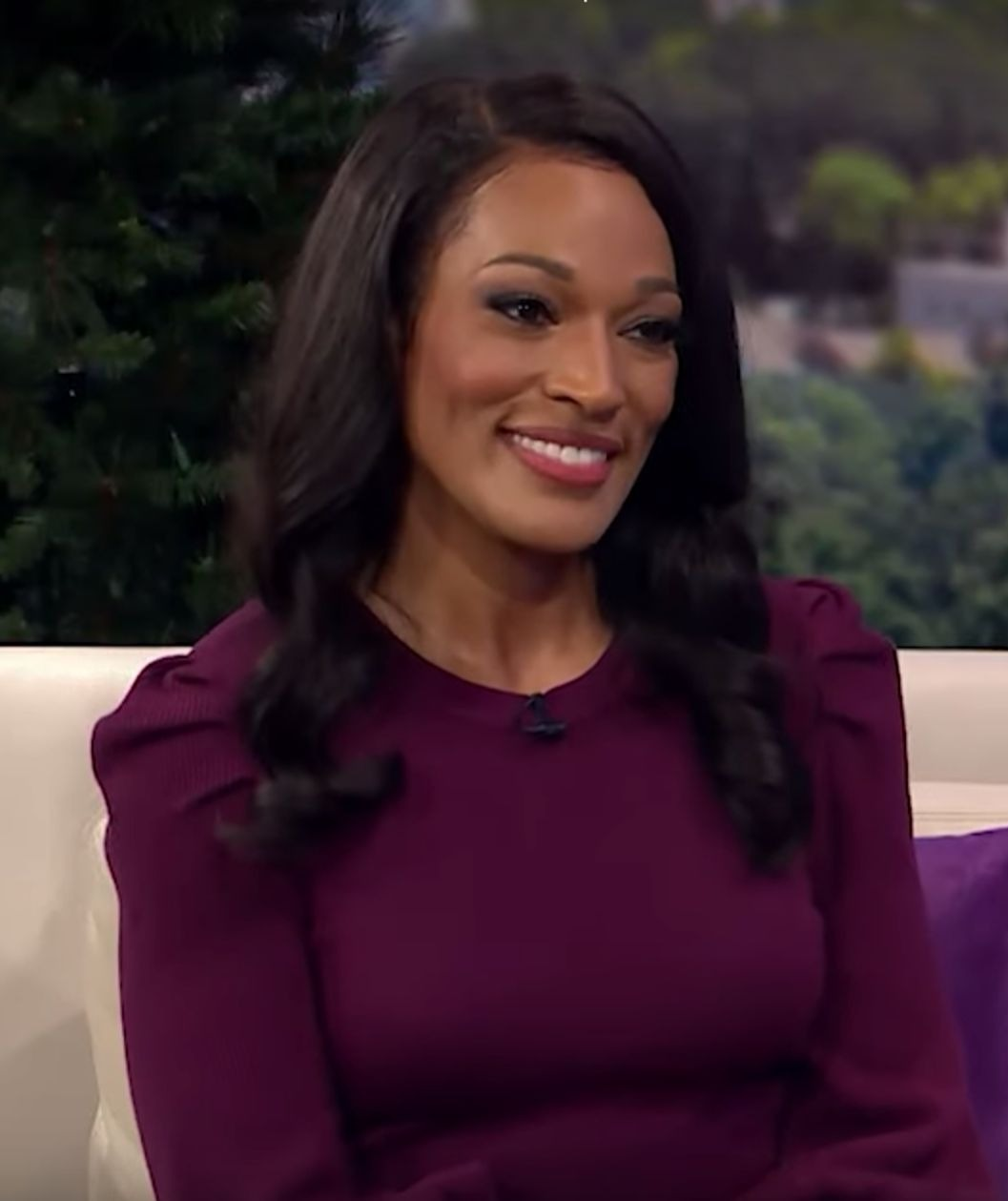
- Kron Moore in 2019
- Born: April 16, 1977 (age 49); Detroit, Michigan, U.S
- Occupation: Actress
- Years active: 2006–present

Kron Moore (pronounced Kay-Ren) is an American actress and singer. She is known for her role as First Lady Victoria Franklin in the BET prime time soap opera The Oval and Bridget Chapel in Stargirl.

== Life and career ==
Moore was born and raised in Detroit, Michigan. She began performing in school plays, but later pursued her career in music, performing in a number of R&B and soul bands before a solo career. She released her debut album in 2002, but it was not a commercial success. She attended the University of Alabama where she earned a bachelor's degree in Psychology.

As an actress, Moore played small roles in films Into the Storm (2014) and The SpongeBob Movie: Sponge Out of Water (2015). On television, she appeared in Tyler Perry's The Haves and the Have Nots and Too Close to Home, before in 2019 he cast Moore in his prime time soap opera The Oval. She plays manipulative First Lady of the United States Victoria Franklin opposite Ed Quinn. Moore also has a recurring role as Bridget Chapel in the DC Universe series Stargirl in 2020. In 2022, she co-starred opposite Amber Riley in the Lifetime thriller Single Black Female.

== Filmography ==
=== Film ===
Year	Title	Role	Notes
2006	InZer0	Seraphic Being	Short
2010	Game Over	Shawnee	Short
2012	The Outsourced	Diamond	
2013	Sucker	Reporter	
2014	Into the Storm	Mrs. Blasky	
2014	Fade	Girl	Short
2015	The SpongeBob Movie: Sponge Out of Water	Woman on Sidewalk	
2018	Dinner for Two	Gloria	TV movie
2020	Beast Beast	Linney	
2022	Single Black Female	Clarke Michelle	

=== Television ===
Year	Title	Role	Notes
2010	Detroit 1-8-7	Nurse	Episode: "Pharmacy Double/Bullet Train"
2014	Swamp Murders	Medical Examiner	Episode: "The Chameleon Killer"
2016	The Haves and the Have Nots	Female Detective	Episode: "Criminology 101"
2017	Too Close to Home	Reporter #2	Episode: "Mercury"
2019	Saints & Sinners	New Attorney	Episode: "Big Sister is Watching"
2019	David Makes Man	Grace	Episode: "Some I Love Who Are Dead"
2019–present	The Oval	First Lady Victoria Franklin	Main cast
2020	Legends of Tomorrow	Dr. Chapel	Episode: "Crisis on Infinite Earths: Part Five"
2020-22	Stargirl	Dr. Bridget Chapel	Recurring cast
2021	Covenant	Mayor Hughes	Episodes: "The Enemy - Part 1 & 2"
