= Hollywood Today Live =

US television news program

- Genre: Entertainment, news
- Country of origin: United States
- Original language: English

Original release
- Release: 2014 – April 2017

Hollywood Today Live was a daily syndicated entertainment news program distributed by Media General stations along with Fox Television Stations under a traditional syndication arrangement, and was produced by Media General's Bitesize division from a studio based in the Hollywood and Vine area of Hollywood. The show was hosted by Ross Mathews, Kristen Brockman, Tanner Thomason, Garcelle Beauvais, red carpet correspondent Amanda Salas, and various guest co-hosts.

The series launched in 2014, and was cancelled in April 2017, shortly after Nexstar completed its purchase of Media General; the lean-run and local-centric Nexstar had no interest in producing a syndicated infotainment program which came with an expensive leased Hollywood studio. In addition, the affiliate base of the program never expanded outside of that of Media General or FTS before its cancellation.

Finally, many stations with strength from other programs in the timeslot where HTL was carried live often refused to carry it in the intended live timeslot, had no interest in promoting a program forced upon them by corporate mandate without local feedback, or had more successful programming such as Entertainment Tonight in the format; for instance, WBAY-TV in Green Bay, an ET-carrying station, aired HTL as a late night offering and offered all but the most minimal promotion on-air and its website required by Media General, never carried promotional tie-in material for the show on its newscasts, and immediately removed the series from their schedule after their sale to Gray Television closed without as much as a viewer notice. WBAY was sold in order to address antitrust concerns in the Media General/Nexstar merger.

Porscha Coleman was one of the show's hosts before being fired. She sued alleging discrimination.
