= Heather Hemmens =

American actress, director (born 1984)

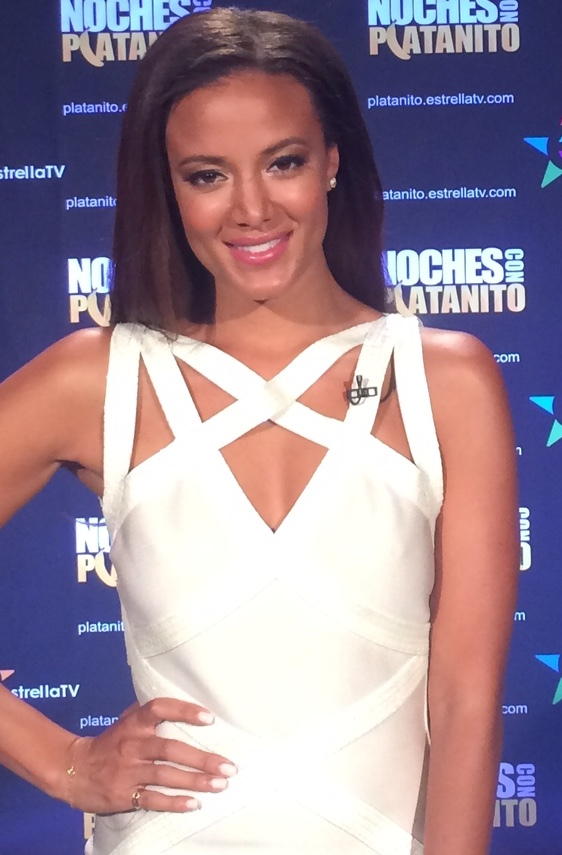
- Born: July 10, 1984 (age 42); Waldo, Maine, U.S.
- Occupations: Actress; director; producer
- Years active: 2003–present

Heather Hemmens (born July 10, 1984) is an American actress, film director, and film producer. She is best known for her role as Alice Verdura in The CW series Hellcats (2010–2011). She starred as Stacy Collins in the Netflix comedy Dad Stop Embarrassing Me! opposite Jamie Foxx and starred as Maria DeLuca in the series Roswell, New Mexico (2019–2022). Previous credits include the OWN series, If Loving You Is Wrong, where she played Marcie Holmes for five seasons.

== Early life and education ==
Hemmens was born to a white American father and a Costa Rican mother in Waldo, Maine. Hemmens attended the performing arts high school Walnut Hill School for the Arts near Boston for her final two years of high school graduating in 2002. She went to Los Angeles to pursue an acting career upon graduating. She has a black belt in martial arts and weapons training.

== Career ==
In her early career, Hemmens had small roles in the films The Dukes of Hazzard (2005) and Glory Road (2006). In addition, Hemmens has also directed and produced the short films Perils of an Active Mind and Designated which were both released in 2010. In 2010, she was cast as Alice Verdura in The CW series Hellcats, a comedy-drama about competitive college cheerleading, executive produced by Tom Welling. The show received mixed reviews, but Hemmens' performance was very positively received by critics, with many referring to her as the breakout star. The series was canceled after one season in 2011. She also guest starred on CSI: NY, CSI: Miami, Without a Trace, The Haves and the Have Nots, Grey's Anatomy, and The Vampire Diaries.

In 2014, Hemmens was cast as one of leads in the Oprah Winfrey Network prime time soap opera If Loving You Is Wrong, created, produced and written by Tyler Perry. In 2018, she was cast in the CW series, Roswell, New Mexico.

In March 2022, Hemmens signed a multi-picture contract with Crown Media Family Networks.

== Filmography ==
=== Film ===
Year	Title	Role	Notes
2004	Pop Rocks	Groupie #1	TV movie
2005	The Dukes of Hazzard	Girl #1	
2006	Glory Road	Latin Girl	
2008	The Candy Shop	Yanni	
2009	Road to the Altar	Z	
2010	Perils of an Active Mind	Kim	Short
2011	3 Musketeers	Alexandra D'Artagnan	Video
2012	Rise of the Zombies	Ashley	
2013	Complicity	Kimberly	
2019	Love, Take Two	Lily Bellenger	TV movie
2021	Christmas in My Heart	Beth	TV movie
2022	Caribbean Summer	Jade	TV movie
2023	A Pinch of Portugal	Anna	TV movie
2023	Come Fly With Me	Emma 'Blitz' Fitzgerald	TV movie
2024	The Groomsmen: First Look	Chelsea	TV movie trilogy
2024	The Groomsmen: Second Chances	Chelsea	TV movie trilogy
2024	The Groomsmen: Last Dance	Chelsea	TV movie trilogy
2024	Christmas Under the Lights	Emily	TV movie
2025	Texas Two-Step	Olivia	TV movie

=== Television ===
Year	Title	Role	Notes
2006	CSI: NY	Paris Brooks	Episode: "Murder Sings the Blues"
2007	CSI: Miami	Stephanie Bennett	Episode: "Dangerous Son"
2007	Without a Trace	Freddy	Episode: "Clean Up"
2010–11	Hellcats	Alice Verdura	Main Cast
2013	The Haves and the Have Nots	Darci	Episode: "Angry Sex" & "The Criminal"
2013	Grey's Anatomy	Sasha	Episode: "Seal Our Fate" & "I Want You with Me"
2014	The Vampire Diaries	Maggie James	Episode: "Man on Fire"
2014	Reckless	Brenda	Episode: "Pilot"
2014–19	If Loving You Is Wrong	Marcie Holmes	Main Cast: Season 1-4
2018	Yellowstone	Melody Prescott	Recurring Cast: Season 1
2019–22	Roswell, New Mexico	Maria DeLuca	Main Cast
2021	Dad Stop Embarrassing Me!	Stacy Collins	Main Cast
