= The Jamie Foxx Show =

American television sitcom (1996–2001)

- Genre: Sitcom
- Created by: Bentley Kyle Evans; Jamie Foxx
- Starring: Jamie Foxx; Garcelle Beauvais; Christopher B. Duncan; Ellia English; Garrett Morris; Andy Berman
- Theme music composer: Jamie Foxx
- Opening theme: "Here Comes Jamie Foxx" (seasons 1–3) "The Simple Things Are All I Need" (seasons 4–5), both performed by Jamie Foxx
- Composer: Bill Maxwell
- Country of origin: United States
- Original language: English
- No. of seasons: 5
- No. of episodes: 100 (list of episodes)

Production
- Executive producers: Bentley Kyle Evans; Marcus King (seasons 2–5); Bennie R. Richburg, Jr. (seasons 2–5); Jamie Foxx (seasons 3–5)
- Producer: Drew Brown
- Production locations: Warner Bros. Studios, Burbank, California
- Camera setup: Videotape; Multi-camera
- Running time: 30 minutes
- Production companies: Bent Outta Shape Productions; Foxxhole Productions; Warner Bros. Television

Original release
- Network: The WB
- Release: August 28, 1996 – January 14, 2001

The Jamie Foxx Show is an American television sitcom, created by Jamie Foxx and Bentley Kyle Evans for The WB. It premiered on August 28, 1996, and ended on January 14, 2001, with a total of 100 episodes over the course of five seasons.

Although the show was not a major success with the ratings due to The WB being a relatively new network, the show did help launch Foxx's acting career while also relaunching Garrett Morris' career after his 1994 shooting. It also served as a launch pad for Garcelle Beauvais, who later starred in ABC's NYPD Blue.

== Synopsis ==
Jamie King (Jamie Foxx) is an aspiring musician from Terrell, Texas, who has come to Los Angeles to pursue a career in entertainment. To support himself, he worked at his family's hotel, the financially strapped King's Tower, which is owned by his aunt and uncle, Aunt Helen and Uncle Junior King (Ellia English and Garrett Morris).

Among his co-workers during the series' run were the beautiful and intelligent front desk clerk Francesca "Fancy" Monroe (Garcelle Beauvais) and Jamie's high-strung, stuffed-shirt, "bourgeois" nemesis/frenemy Braxton P. Hartnabrig (Christopher B. Duncan), who works as an accountant for the King's Tower.

Jamie's romantic overtures toward Fancy were mostly unrequited until the final two seasons, when the two began to tentatively date and eventually became engaged and finally married. Braxton, who generally took the brunt of Jamie's insults, was known to get in a few digs of his own as the series progressed, eventually becoming Jamie's best friend and, at one point, roommate.

== Cast ==
=== Main ===
- Jamie Foxx as Jamie Percy King
- Garcelle Beauvais as Francesca Danielle "Fancy" Monroe
- Christopher B. Duncan as Braxton P. Hartnabrig
- Ellia English as Aunt Helen King
- Garrett Morris as Uncle Junior King
- Andy Berman as Dennis, the bellboy (season 1, episodes 1–12)

=== Recurring ===
- Orlando Brown as Nelson (seasons 1–3)
- Suli McCullough as Mouse (seasons 4–5). McCullough portrayed a different character in season 3 (episode: "Where There's a Will...")
- Alex Thomas as Phil (seasons 4–5)
- Walter Franks as Blab (season 2, episodes 5, 14, 17)
- Speedy as various characters (seasons 1-5, 10 episodes)
- Gladys Knight (season 1, episode 22, and season 5, episode 12) and Jo Marie Payton (season 3, episode 7) as Janice King, Jamie's mother
- Sherri Shepherd as Sheila Yarborough (seasons 4–5)
- Chris Spencer as Curtis (season 4)
- Susan Wood as Cameron (season 3)
- Alan F. Smith as Silas (season 3)
- Blake Clark as Bob Nelson (season 4)
- Kellita Smith as Cherise (seasons 2–3)
- Rhona Bennett as Nicole Evans (season 4)
- Karen Maruyama as Gloria (seasons 4–5)
- Billy Davis Jr. and Marilyn McCoo as William and Joan Monroe, Fancy's parents (seasons 4, episode 8, and season 5, episode 12)
- Scott Atkinson as Hawkins (season 4, episodes 4, 14, 18, and 22)
- Gerald LeVert as Charles Young, Jamie's stepfather (season 3, episode 7, and season 5, episode 12)

== Episodes ==
| Season | Episodes | Originally released | |
| Season | Episodes | First released | Last released |
|---|---|---|---|
| 1 | 22 | August 28, 1996 | May 14, 1997 |
| 2 | 22 | September 7, 1997 | May 17, 1998 |
| 3 | 20 | September 17, 1998 | May 20, 1999 |
| 4 | 24 | September 24, 1999 | May 19, 2000 |
| 5 | 12 | October 8, 2000 | January 14, 2001 |

== Reruns and syndication ==
The series was distributed in broadcast syndication by Telepictures Distribution and Warner Bros. Domestic Television Distribution, and aired on local television stations from 2000 to 2003. Reruns of the series also aired on BET from 2005 to 2008 and started airing once again from 2009 to 2016, and as part of The CW's The CW Daytime block along with reruns of The Wayans Bros. from September 2008 to September 2009. In the 2010s, reruns also aired on Centric, VH1 and MTV2 (until 2020, but as of 2020/2021 only MTV2 shows reruns of the series late nights). Reruns of the series have also been shown on Dabl.

In Jamaica, the series aired on Television Jamaica and CVM Television. In Canada, the series aired on The Comedy Network and Much.

Several episodes of The Jamie Foxx Show were also available on AOL's In2TV, which allowed Internet users to watch streamed or download high resolution episodes of various favorite classics. Since Time Warner's June 2009 announcement that it would split from America Online, the episodes have been moved over to AOL Video.

On November 1, 2021, all episodes of The Jamie Foxx Show were made available for streaming on HBO Max.

== Home media ==
Warner Home Video released season one of The Jamie Foxx Show on DVD in Region 1 on February 8, 2005.

Warner Archive has subsequently released seasons 2–4 on DVD. These are Manufacture-on-Demand (MOD) releases, available from Warner's online store and Amazon. The fifth season has not been released on DVD.

| DVD name | Ep # | Release date |
|---|---|---|
| The Complete First Season | 22 | February 8, 2005 |
| The Complete Second Season | 22 | March 7, 2017 |
| The Complete Third Season | 20 | June 27, 2017 |
| The Complete Fourth Season | 24 | October 24, 2017 |

== In popular culture ==
American producer Pi'erre Bourne used a clip from an early episode in the show as a producer tag, "Yo Pi'erre, you wanna come out here?". Most notably featured in the 2017 hit song "Magnolia" by American rapper Playboi Carti.
