= Black Excellence Brunch =

Black meeting event in the United States

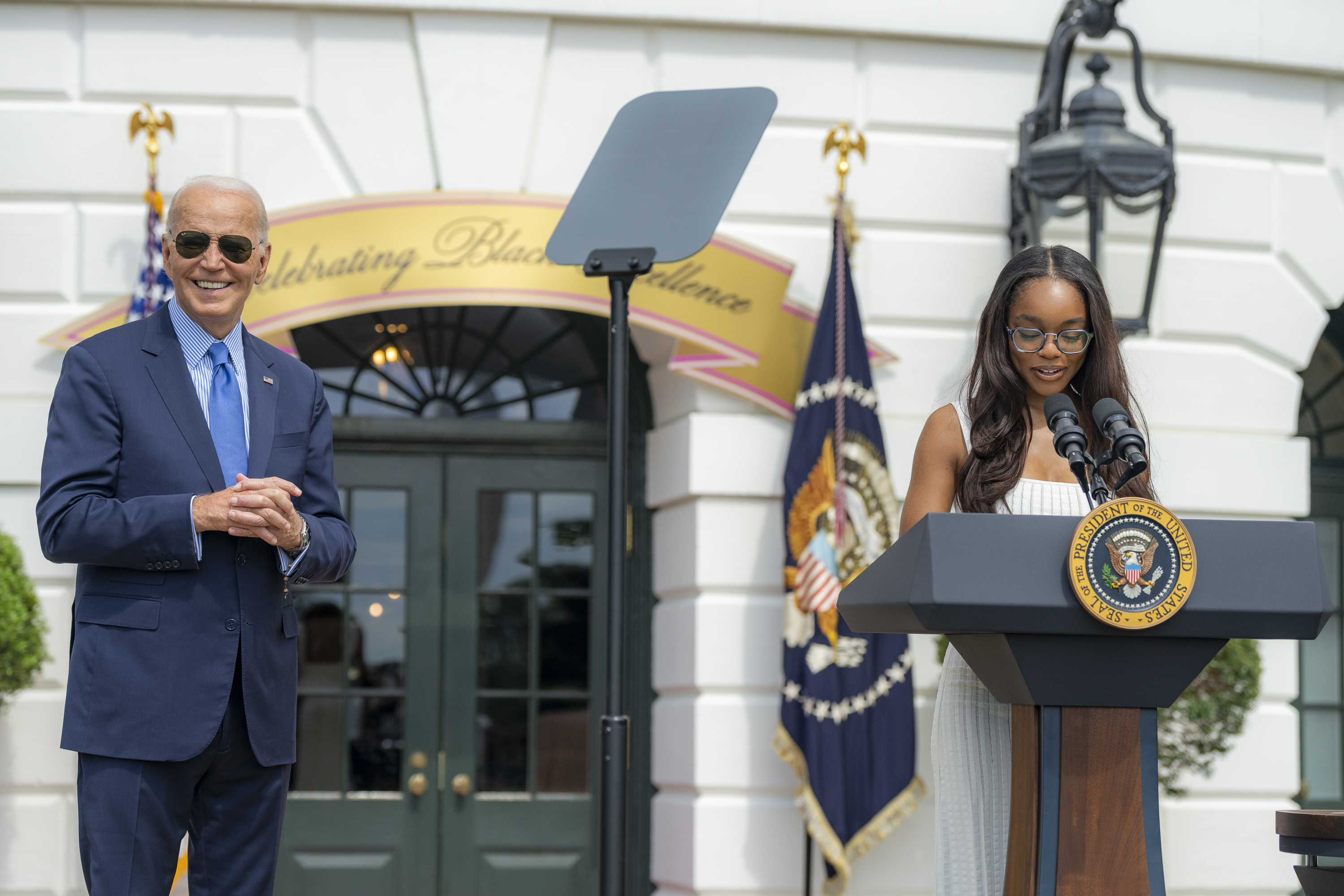
President Joe Biden is introduced by Marsai Martin at a Black Excellence brunch at the White House in 2024.

Black Excellence Brunch is a series of convenings, held all across the United States and abroad, with a stated purpose of discussing achievements and concerns relevant to the Black community.

The series was founded by Trell Thomas who was inspired by Black Sunday family gatherings. Since its founding, the meeting has been hosted in a number of venues, including the White House in 2024.

== Background ==
Thomas grew up in South Carolina, where he would spend many Sundays going to church and afterward having dinners with his family members and the Black community around him: "My mom hosted at our home every Sunday, and it was one of the first places where I got to see and feel the joy of being a Black person."

From then on, Thomas began a career in the entertainment industry, and starting in 2018, he sought to employ the cultural tradition in order to nurture similar spaces of "national impact" with community leaders. The idea for the Black Excellence Brunch began when he had moved from New York City to Los Angeles and dined with his friends, while dressed in all white, at a rooftop restaurant in the former city: "I just remember looking around the table and seeing people like sit up a little bit taller, smile a little bit brighter, laugh a little bit louder and I thought to myself, if I could just give us this feeling all the time."

== History ==
A nationwide phenomenon, Black Excellence Brunches have been in a litany of locations and communities, including Southern Methodist University, Clarksville, Tennessee, and others. During the COVID-19 pandemic, Thomas hosted Black Excellence Brunches virtually. A Black Excellence Brunch has also been held in Ghana.

Many Black Excellence Brunches are also held annually at festivals across the United States, including the Essence Festival of Culture in New Orleans, Louisiana; the Toronto International Film Festival in Toronto, Canada; the American Black Film Festival in Miami, Florida; and the Martha's Vineyard Film Festival in Martha's Vineyard, Massachusetts.

=== 2023 ===
In March 2023, a Black Excellence Brunch was held at The Gathering Spot in Los Angeles in anticipation of Shazam! Fury of the Gods in order to honor one of its stars, Meagan Good. Thomas partnered with Warner Brothers to host the event, and guests included Crystal Renee Hayslett, KJ Smith, Skyh Black, and others.

In May, a Black Excellence Brunch was held in Atlanta, Georgia in celebration of Mother's Day.

In August, a Black Excellence Brunch was held in Los Angeles; Kelly Rowland was among its honorees.

On December 3, the Black Excellence Brunch hosted a screening of The Color Purple in the Linwood Dunn Theatre in Hollywood, Los Angeles; a brunch was hosted afterward at Serra On Vine, with a menu of Southern food by Chef Joe. Many in the film's cast—Danielle Brooks, Taraji P. Henson, Fantasia, among others—as well as its director, Blitz Bazawule, were in attendance, among other high-profile guests like Da Brat, Aba Arthur, and Kevin On Stage.

=== 2024 ===
In March 2024, the Black Excellence Brunch hosted a "To Be Celebrated" event in West Hollywood, California in celebration of the Academy Awards and Women's History Month. SZA, Kyla Pratt, and Niecy Nash were among the attendees.

On September 13, during the Congressional Black Caucus' 53rd Annual Legislative Conference, the Joe Biden administration held a Black Excellence Brunch for the first time ever at the White House South Lawn. Karine Jean-Pierre and Joe Biden both delivered remarks; the latter made an endorsement to the Kamala Harris 2024 presidential campaign, condemned the Springfield pet-eating hoax, and celebrated achievements made by his administration toward the Black community. Other attendees included Thomas himself, Al Sharpton, Hakeem Jeffries, Raphael Warnock, Wes Moore, LeToya Luckett, Roland Martin, Marsai Martin, Iyanla Vanzant, Anthony Anderson, Tabitha Brown, and many others, as well as the St. Augustine Gospel Choir. Monica performed after speeches.

In November, the Black Excellence Brunch hosted a celebration of Black women, in Atlanta, in collaboration with Black Lives Matter. Black Girls Rock! received a $50,000 contribution, and Thomas hosted a fireside chat with Monica. Other attendees included Beverly Bond, Cicley Gay, and Towanda Braxton.

=== 2025 ===
In February 2025, Thomas collaborated with Disney in order to host a Black Excellence Brunch at Walt Disney Studios in Burbank, specifically to honor Black storytellers. Anika Noni Rose, Nate Moore, and Raamla Mohamed attended, among many others. In the same month, a Black Excellence Brunch was held in Atlanta to celebrate the premiere of Beyond the Gates.
