= Bentley Kyle Evans =

American screenwriter

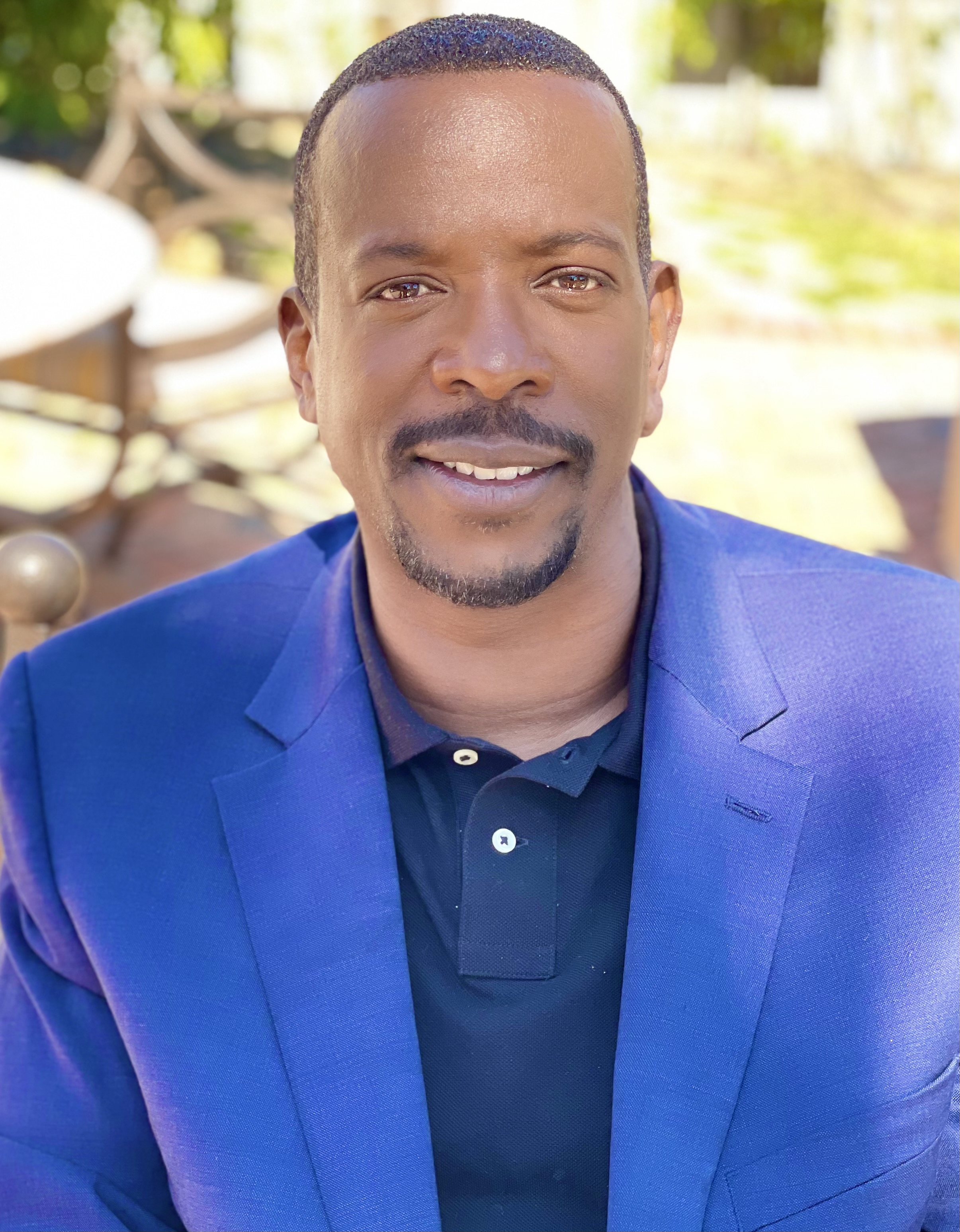
- Born: August 10, 1966 (age 60); Oakland, California, U.S.
- Occupations: Writer, producer, director
- Years active: 1990–present
- Notable work: Martin; The Jamie Foxx Show
- Spouse: Valicia Evans
- Children: 2

Bentley Kyle Evans (born August 10, 1966) is an American television writer, producer, director and actor. He is a native of Oakland, California.

== Early life ==
Evans was born in Oakland, California. Though Evans was born in the Bay Area, he was raised in the View Park-Windsor Hills neighborhood of Los Angeles. He graduated from Westchester High School in 1984. Shortly after, in 1986, he was a Production Assistant on Robert Townsend's "Hollywood Shuffle". He also earned a small speaking role in the film that got him into the Screen Actors Guild (SAG).

== Career ==
Evans made his acting debut in the 1990 film House Party. He is most notable as the show runner on several sitcoms, among them Martin (1992–1997) on FOX, The Jamie Foxx Show (1996–2001) on The WB, and Love That Girl! (2010–2014) on TV One. Outside of television, Evans is the co-screenwriter, with his Martin star Martin Lawrence, of Lawrence's 1996 feature film, A Thin Line Between Love and Hate.

Evans created, executive produces and directs the TV series Family Time, which became Bounce TV's first original scripted program. Evans is also the creator of other Bounce TV sitcoms, such as In the Cut and Grown Folks. In addition, Evans executive produced a new Jamie Foxx sitcom, Dad Stop Embarrassing Me!, which debuted on Netflix in 2021.

Evans teamed up with famed rapper MC Lyte and together they co-created the series Partners in Rhyme which premiered on the ALLBLK. Evans directed the first and second season.

Also on ALLBLK, Evans Executive produces and directs the situation comedy, Millennials. The second season is set to air in the third quarter of 2022.

In 2022, Evans co-wrote and co-executive produced Martin: The Reunion on BET+.

== Personal life ==
Evans has a son and a daughter. His son, Bentley Kyle Evans Jr., had a main role as Devin Stallworth on the TV series Family Time. His daughter, KyLee Evans, is a writer for The Proud Family: Louder and Prouder on Disney+.
