= Maneater (2022 film) =

- Directed by: Justin Lee
- Written by: Justin Lee
- Produced by: Daemon Hillin
- Starring: Nicky Whelan; Shane West; Trace Adkins; Branscombe Richmond; Jeff Fahey
- Cinematography: Eamon Long
- Music by: Daniel Figueiredo
- Production companies: Hillin Entertainment; Benetone Films
- Distributed by: Saban Films
- Release date: 2 March 2022
- Running time: 89 minutes
- Country: United States
- Language: English

Maneater is a 2022 American horror thriller film directed by Justin Lee, starring Nicky Whelan, Shane West, Trace Adkins, Branscombe Richmond and Jeff Fahey.

== Cast ==
- Nicky Whelan as Jessie
- Shane West as Will
- Trace Adkins as Harlan
- Branscombe Richmond as Sheriff Kua
- Jeff Fahey as Professor Hoffman
- Porscha Coleman as Sunny
- Zoe Cipres as Emma
- Kelly Lynn Reiter as Brianna
- Alex Farnham as Ty
- Ed Morrone as Captain Wally
- Kim DeLonghi as Beth

== Release ==
The film was released in theatres, on demand and digital on 26 August 2022.

== Plot ==
The opening credits show an anonymous diver exploring the gorgeous reefs get munched by the Great White.

Jennifer, Harlan's twenty-something daughter, goes surfing on her own and is knocked off her board. She tries to clamber back on but realises she's missing one of her hands; then the Great White comes back in for the kill. Harlan, a widower, later tells the sheriff he only had bits of her to bury after her remains were washed up on a local beach.

A young man jumping off a popular cliff into a lagoon is grabbed in mid-air by the shark, which leaps up out of the white surf.

Captain Wally, on the boat with his wife Beth while Jessie and her friends spend a night on the island, drops his walkie-talkie radio into the sea. He goes into the water to grab it, but while he rests on the boat's steps he's killed by the shark.

Shocked by what has happened to her husband, Beth falls in to the water, tangled in some of the boat's ropes, and she too is killed.

Next morning on the island, Emma and Ty wake up early and go for a swim. Ty has previously cut his hand badly on a knife and has been warned by Wally on no account to go into the water, as sharks can smell the blood. In the sea, he and Emma are attacked. Emma is eaten and Ty's body is later discovered on one of the island's beaches by Jessie and Sunny.

Wally's radio is discovered washed up on the island, so Will rows back to the boat in the dinghy to find out what has happened. Sunny, Brianna and Jessie shout to Will to come back now they've discovered Ty's body. As Will rows towards them they see the shark, which tips him intro the water. He's attacked near the shore. Brianna ties a rope round herself and dives in to save him, with Sunny and Jessie ready to pull her in once she's got hold of Will.

They do this, but the enormous shark grabs Will and Breanna, and pulls Sunny into the sea too. Both young women are killed, though Will survives and drags himself up onto the beach, minus a leg. Jessie tries to treat him with a belt tourniquet and alcohol. She then calls for help on the radio, her appeal heard by Harlan who comes to find her. (We see Will's body at the very end, and he looks as if he's died.)

The shark is trapped in a shallow bay; the tide has gone out and it can't swim out over the reef. Jessie decides to act as bait, diving off the reef and swimming as fast as she can to Harlan's rather decrepit boat. The shark chases her but as she reaches the boat she ducks down into the water, just as the shark launches upwards and opens its cavernous mouth. Harlan repeatedly shoots it, and it sinks dead beneath the surface. Jessie resurfaces, alive and well.

There is one more death: at the end of the film, Harlan is visited at home by his friend Sam, who brings with him a young man called Peter. Peter has a tourism business in South East Asia, and his 10 year old son has been killed by a shark, along with two tourists. They want Harlan, now a hero, to go and kill it. Harlan agrees, despite not wanting to go back to that area.

== Reception ==
John Townsend of Starburst rated the film 2 stars out of 5 and wrote that it is "One for the shark completists only." Matt Donato of IGN gave the film a rating of 3 out of 10. Jeffrey Anderson of Common Sense Media rated the film 1 star out of 5 and called it "abysmally bad".

Ian Sedensky of Culture Crypt gave the film a score of 20 out of 100, writing that "meanders well past the point of fleshing out everyone with backstories and over the border into full-on "where's the shark already?" boredom." Matthew Monagle of The Austin Chronicle rated the film 0.5 stars out of 5, calling it a "particularly rough watch". Noel Murray of the Los Angeles Times wrote that "By the end, "Maneater" has walked right up to the edge of being a fun, silly, "so bad it's good" time-killer. But after taking way too long, it never really arrives there."

Matthew Mahler of MovieWeb wrote that the film "is never gripping or scary enough to ever distract from the silliness of its scenes, making it oddly more fun to put on with some friends for a laugh." Peter Martin of ScreenAnarchy called the film a "fun flick that feels like the fading rays of summer in our North American summer."
