= Sanford Jay Frank =

American screenwriter

- Born: July 21, 1954; Springfield, Massachusetts, U.S.
- Died: April 18, 2014 (aged 59); Calabasas, California, U.S.
- Education: Harvard
- Occupation: television writer

Sanford Jay "Sandy" Frank, also known as Sandy Frank (July 21, 1954 – April 18, 2014), was a television writer who was known as a writer for Late Night with David Letterman. He wrote for Letterman's NBC show for four years, during which the show won four Emmy Awards for comedy-variety writing. Frank had a bachelor's degree in mathematics and a law degree from Harvard and had written for The Harvard Lampoon.

He joined the writing staff for Late Night after running into his old college friend Jim Downey who served as head writer for the Letterman show and had been an original staff writer for Saturday Night Live. He also wrote for In Living Color and The Fresh Prince of Bel-Air.

== Other ==
In 2011, he authored his first book, The Inner Game of Screenwriting.

== Personal life ==
Frank was born in Springfield, Massachusetts and had a wife and three daughters. He died of brain cancer on April 18, 2014, aged 59.
