= List of CSI episodes =

There are episode lists for each of the four TV series in the CSI franchise:

- List of CSI: Crime Scene Investigation episodes, for the original Las Vegas–based series
- List of CSI: Miami episodes, for the Florida-based series
- List of CSI: NY episodes, for the New York City–based series
- List of CSI: Cyber episodes, for the CSI: Crime Scene Investigation spin-off focusing on cyber crimes
