= Basketball Wives season 4 =

Basketball Wives
- Season 4
- DVD cover
- Starring: Kesha Nichols; Kenya Bell; Suzie Kectham; Royce Reed; Jennifer Williams; Tami Roman; Evelyn Lozada; Shaunie O'Neal
- No. of episodes: 17

Release
- Original network: VH1
- Original release: February 20 – June 11, 2012

Season chronology
- ← Previous; Season 3 Next → Season 5

The fourth season of the reality television series Basketball Wives aired on VH1 from February 20, 2012 until June 11, 2012. The show was primarily filmed in Miami, Florida and New York, New York. It was executively produced by Nick Emmerson, Alex Demyanenko, Shaunie O'Neal, Jill Holmes, Tom Huffman, and Sean Rankine.

The show chronicles the lives of a group of women who are the wives and girlfriends, or have been romantically linked to, professional basketball players in the National Basketball Association, though the title of the series does not make this differentiation, solely referring to the women as "wives".

== Production ==
Basketball Wives debuted on April 11, 2010, with thirty-minute episodes. The second season premiered on December 12, 2010, with expanded sixty-minute episodes and featured new cast member Tami Roman. Season 3 made its debut on May 30, 2011, with new cast member Meeka Claxton. The fourth season premiered on February 20, 2012, with two new cast members, Kenya Bell and Kesha Nichols and the departure of Claxton. The fifth season premiered on August 19, 2013, with Tasha Marbury joining the cast. According to a tweet from Tami Roman, the show has been quietly though officially cancelled.

== Cast ==
=== Main cast ===
- Kesha Nichols: Ex-Fiancée of Richard Jefferson
- Kenya Bell: Wife of Charlie Bell
- Royce Reed: Ex-Dancer for Miami/Orlando
- Suzie Ketcham: Ex-Girlfriend of Michael Olowokandi
- Tami Roman: Ex-Wife of Kenny Anderson
- Jennifer Williams: Ex-Wife of Eric Williams
- Evelyn Lozada: Fiancée of Chad Ochocinco
- Shaunie O'Neal: Ex-Wife of Shaquille O'Neal

== Episodes ==
No. overall	No. in season	Title	Original release date	U.S. viewers (millions)
35	1	"Season Premiere"	February 20, 2012	2.50
The explosive fourth season opens in NY to reveal Jen & Evelyn's ten-year friendship on the rocks. Two new ladies are also introduced to the mix: wife/aspiring singer Kenya Bell & ex-fiancee/professional dancer Kesha Nichols. Kesha Nichols and Kenya Bell are added to the opening credits, replacing departing cast member Meeka .
36	2	"Episode 2"	February 27, 2012	2.04
Evelyn and Chad meet to discuss social media accusations of infidelity, while the ladies discover some shocking videos of Kenya online.
37	3	"Episode 3"	March 5, 2012	1.93
Shaunie, Evelyn, & Tami take Kenya to task over throwing Kesha under the bus at her music video auditions. Suzie's behavior at a charity event raises eyebrows, & Tami takes to the therapist's couch to combat her anger issues.
38	4	"Episode 4"	March 12, 2012	1.90
Tami sees red over Kesha talking behind her back. Also, the ladies are conspicuously absent from one of Jen's lip gloss launch events.
39	5	"Episode 5"	March 19, 2012	1.78
Shaunie's birthday party goes south when Evelyn attacks Jen over loyalty and how she's changed in the spotlight of fame. Also, Suzie and Royce drop in on Kesha's family farm in North Carolina while en route to Miami.
40	6	"Episode 6"	March 26, 2012	1.97
The fallout from Jen and Ev's confrontation at Shaunie's birthday party continues, and Ev lays into Kenya for calling her "loose".
41	7	"Episode 7"	April 2, 2012	1.72
Kenya tries to explain herself after some nasty gossip loops back to Evelyn, but things really heat up when Kesha brings in a friend to collaborate her version of the story.
42	8	"Episode 8"	April 9, 2012	1.77
Evelyn and Kenya's feud over loose talk escalates to the point of no return. Also, Suzie's penchant for peacemaking returns as she takes a stab at squashing Royce and Jen's beef.
43	9	"Episode 9"	April 16, 2012	2.02
A trip to the races turns explosive when Evelyn's friend and assistant Nia challenges Jen's recent behavior. Also, Tami and her mother work through some of their issues.
44	10	"Episode 10"	April 23, 2012	1.87
Fallout from Evelyn, Jen, and Nia's altercation at the racetrack deepens the divides within the group. Also, Royce introduces boyfriend Dezmon Briscoe to the girls.
45	11	"Episode 11"	April 30, 2012	1.76
Evelyn and Chad discuss their upcoming wedding while Royce and her father get into it over Royce's relationship with football player Dezmon Briscoe.
46	12	"Episode 12"	May 7, 2012	1.74
The ladies leave Miami behind for a girls' trip to Tahiti, setting the stage for an epic showdown between Tami and Kesha.
47	13	"Episode 13"	May 14, 2012	2.03
The girls play a practical joke on Kenya. Also, Tami and Kesha's conflict escalates, driving one of them to cut their island vacation short.
48	14	"Episode 14"	May 21, 2012	1.94
Jen's standoffish behavior and declaration that she's "lawyered up" irritates Shaunie and Tami, turning up the heat on the final days of the girls' Tahiti trip.
49	15	"Season Finale"	May 28, 2012	1.78
The ladies' trip to Tahiti erupts when Jen is called out on her erratic behavior. After the trip, Shaunie seeks an assist from a higher power in making a life-altering decision.
50	16	"Reunion: Part 1"	June 4, 2012	2.24
John Salley is back as host as the ladies reunite and questions are answered. Can Evelyn and Jennifer finally reconcile their differences? Will Tami apologize to Kesha for her behavior in Tahiti?
51	17	"Reunion: Part 2"	June 11, 2012	2.22
In the final hour of the reunion, tears flow and tempers flare as host John Salley holds no topic off-limits. Also, Shaunie reveals her thoughts on the season's final scene. This episode marks the final appearances of Royce and Kesha, as well as the final regular appearances of Kenya and Jennifer (until the sixth season )
