= Basketball Wives season 5 =

Basketball Wives
- Season 5
- Cover used by ITunes Store
- Starring: Tasha Marbury; Suzie Ketcham; Tami Roman; Evelyn Lozada; Shaunie O'Neal
- No. of episodes: 10

Release
- Original network: VH1
- Original release: August 19 – October 21, 2013

Season chronology
- ← Previous; Season 4 Next → Season 6

The fifth season of the reality television series Basketball Wives aired on VH1 from August 19, 2013 until October 21, 2013. The show was primarily filmed in Miami, Florida and New York, New York. It was executively produced by Nick Emmerson, Alex Demyanenko, Shaunie O'Neal, Jill Holmes, Tom Huffman, and Sean Rankine.

The show chronicles the lives of a group of women who are the wives and girlfriends, or have been romantically linked to, professional basketball players in the National Basketball Association, though the title of the series does not make this differentiation, solely referring to the women as "wives".

== Production ==
Basketball Wives debuted on April 11, 2010, with thirty-minute episodes. The second season premiered on December 12, 2010, with expanded sixty-minute episodes and featured new cast member Tami Roman. Season 3 made its debut on May 30, 2011, with new cast member Meeka Claxton. The fourth season premiered on February 20, 2012, with two new cast members, Kenya Bell and Kesha Nichols and the departure of Claxton. The fifth season premiered on August 19, 2013, with Tasha Marbury joining the cast. According to a tweet from Tami Roman, the show has been quietly though officially cancelled.

== Cast ==
=== Main cast ===
- Tasha Marbury: Wife of Stephon Marbury
- Suzie Ketcham: Ex-Girlfriend of Michael Olowokandi
- Tami Roman: Ex-Wife of Kenny Anderson
- Evelyn Lozada: Ex-Wife of Chad Ochocinco
- Shaunie O'Neal: Ex-Wife of Shaquille O'Neal

=== Recurring cast ===
- Kenya Bell: Ex-Wife of Charlie Bell

== Episodes ==
No. overall	No. in season	Title	Original release date	U.S. viewers (millions)
52	1	"Season Premiere"	August 19, 2013	2.40
Evelyn takes on the media for the first time after an altercation with her husband. Also, Tami tries to convince her to give the marriage a second chance. Tasha Marbury is added to the opening credits replacing departing cast members Kesha, Jennifer and Royce. Kenya is removed from the opening credits and demoted to a recurring cast member
53	2	"Episode 2"	August 26, 2013	1.97
Evelyn's friend Tasha Marbury meets the ladies while Suzie and Tami's insatiable curiosity about an old tabloid scandal makes waves.
54	3	"Episode 3"	September 2, 2013	1.72
The ladies deal with the fallout of Suzie's grilling of Tasha Marbury. Also, Tami raises questions within the group by failing to show for Evelyn's big birthday blowout.
55	4	"Episode 4"	September 9, 2013	1.74
Evelyn takes her issues with her ex to the therapist's couch. Also, Tami expresses her displeasure with Shaunie "planting a bad seed" about her with Tasha.
56	5	"Episode 5"	September 16, 2013	1.97
Tasha's "headbutting" jokes land her and Suzie in hot water with Evelyn. Also, Shaunie tries her hand at producing a play.
57	6	"Episode 6"	September 23, 2013	1.72
Tasha's weave bar grand opening proves more hot mess than hot press. Also, Shaunie, Evelyn and Suzie's early departure from Tasha's birthday party leaves the birthday girl in a bad mood.
58	7	"Episode 7"	September 30, 2013	1.82
Tasha takes Shaunie, Suzie and Evelyn to task for leaving her birthday party but it's what she asks Tami afterward that takes the cake. Also, Suzie and Tasha sprout their own feud after a hotel powwow.
59	8	"Episode 8"	October 7, 2013	2.12
Shaunie announces a girls' trip to London Fashion Week that puts Evelyn's clothing line plans into overdrive. Later, Shaunie's boxing date with Marlon leaves her feeling punchy.
60	9	"Episode 9"	October 14, 2013	1.93
During a whirlwind week in London, Evelyn sweats her hastily arranged Fashion Week debut while the group comes together to help Tasha and Suzie squash their beef.
61	10	"Season Finale"	October 21, 2013	2.23
The ladies help Tasha go toe to toe with a woman who's been posting about her husband online. Also, a surprise invitation to a Kenya Bell performance tests Suzie's patience. This episode marks the final appearance of Suzie, Tasha and Kenya.
