= Basketball Wives season 2 =

Basketball Wives
- Season 2
- DVD Cover
- Starring: Royce Reed; Suzie Ketcham; Tami Roman; Jennifer Williams; Evelyn Lozada; Shaunie O'Neal
- No. of episodes: 12

Release
- Original network: VH1
- Original release: December 12, 2010 – March 14, 2011

Season chronology
- ← Previous; Season 1 Next → Season 3

The second season of the reality television series Basketball Wives aired on VH1 from December 12, 2010 until March 14, 2011. The show was primarily filmed in Miami, Florida. It was executively produced by Nick Emmerson, Alex Demyanenko, Shaunie O'Neal, Jill Holmes, Tom Huffman, and Sean Rankine.

The show chronicles the lives of a group of women who are the wives and girlfriends, or have been romantically linked to, professional basketball players in the National Basketball Association, though the title of the series does not make this differentiation, solely referring to the women as "wives".

== Production ==
Basketball Wives debuted on April 11, 2010, with thirty-minute episodes. The second season premiered on December 12, 2010, with expanded sixty-minute episodes and featured new cast member Tami Roman. Season 3 made its debut on May 30, 2011, with new cast member Meeka Claxton. The fourth season premiered on February 20, 2012, with two new cast members, Kenya Bell and Kesha Nichols and the departure of Claxton. The fifth season premiered on August 19, 2013, with Tasha Marbury joining the cast. According to a tweet from Tami Roman, the show has been quietly though officially cancelled.

== Cast ==
=== Main cast ===
- Royce Reed: Ex-Dancer for Miami/Orlando
- Suzie Ketcham: Ex-Girlfriend of Michael Olowokandi
- Tami Roman: Ex-Wife of Kenny Anderson
- Jennifer Williams: Wife of Eric Williams
- Evelyn Lozada: Ex-Fiancée of Antoine Walker
- Shaunie O'Neal: Ex-Wife of Shaquille O'Neal

=== Recurring cast ===
- Gloria Govan: Fiancée of Matt Barnes
- Kim Russell: Wife of Bryon Russell
- Ashley Walker: Mother of Rafer Alston's child
- Juliannah "Juli" Richmond: Wife of Mitch Richmond

== Episodes ==
No. overall	No. in season	Title	Original release date	U.S. viewers (millions)
10	1	"Season Premiere"	December 12, 2010	1.41
Evelyn draws the line with Suzie over unchecked gossip about a hot weekend in Vegas. Also, Shaunie's attempt to bring Kenny Anderson's ex, Tami, into the circle is met with skepticism. The episode ends with a shocking surprise. Tami Roman is added to the opening credits replacing Gloria Govan, who is demoted to a recurring cast member
11	2	"Episode 2"	December 19, 2010	1.14
Fallout over Suzie and Evelyn's argument has Suzie on the run to an unexpected source….GLORIA! Also, Tami reintroduces her daughters to father Kenny Anderson after many years apart. This episode marks the first appearance of Kim Russell and Juli Richmond.
12	3	"Episode 3"	January 2, 2011	N/A
Shaunie and the ladies launch a surprise ambush on Gloria to find out why her wedding was called off. Jen and Eric finally have "the talk" that will alter the course of their relationship forever.
13	4	"Episode 4"	January 9, 2011	1.38
When Evelyn and Jen finds themselves left off the guest list of a posh fundraiser thrown by circle outsider Ashley Walker, they decide to crash the event. Tempers flare when Tami and Jen get into it over an innocuous remark.
14	5	"Episode 5"	January 16, 2011	1.24
Evelyn and Jen regret volunteering to help Royce and her man Dwayne with a fashion fundraiser. Also, Tami has some surgery done, helping her to lose pounds and setting the stage to gain a friend.
15	6	"Episode 6"	January 23, 2011	1.15
Evelyn is back on the dating scene with a date that ends with a miss…and then one with a kiss. The tension between Jen & Eric reaches a new mark.
16	7	"Episode 7"	January 30, 2011	1.10
Shaunie's surprise announcement of a trip abroad delays Evelyn's connection with flirtatious football icon Chad Ochocinco.
17	8	"Episode 8"	February 6, 2011	0.98
The ladies' trip to Madrid suffers from both Royce's phantom illness and Tami's sudden mood swings. Jen also finds a romantic mark and the women get piggish on the local cuisine.
18	9	"Episode 9"	February 20, 2011	1.05
Jen & Ev accuse Royce of playing both sides by also being friends with outsiders Suzie & Ashley. Additionally, Ashley Walker and player Rafer Alston ambush Jen & Ev to prove that they are, in fact, a genuine item.
19	–	"Top 10 Flagrant Fouls"	February 27, 2011	N/A
Comedian Patrice O'Neal looks back at the top ten moments from Basketball Wives' current season and "Bonus Beefs" from season one.
20	10	"Season Finale"	March 6, 2011	2.28
Evelyn's weekend in Cincinnati with Chad Ochocinco could just be the start of something big. The shocking final act disclosure of a past infidelity links two of the wives and ends the season with an explosive showdown.
21	11	"Reunion: Part 1"	March 13, 2011	1.36
Host John Salley reunites the cast to break down the explosive season finale. He also takes viewers through the ladies' individual journeys this season.
22	12	"Reunion: Part 2"	March 14, 2011	1.90
Host John Salley presses the cast on Jen's recent nude photo scandal and Evelyn's romance with superstar football player Chad Ochocinco. The reunion is also rocked by a couple of surprise guests that are sure to cause an uproar. This episode marks the final appearance of Gloria Govan.
