= Basketball Wives season 3 =

Basketball Wives
- Season 3
- DVD Cover
- Starring: Suzie Ketcham; Meeka Claxton; Royce Reed; Tami Roman; Jennifer Williams; Evelyn Lozada; Shaunie O'Neal
- No. of episodes: 12

Release
- Original network: VH1
- Original release: May 30 – August 22, 2011

Season chronology
- ← Previous; Season 2 Next → Season 4

The third season of the reality television series Basketball Wives aired on VH1 from May 30, 2011 until August 22, 2011. The show was primarily filmed in Miami, Florida. It was executively produced by Nick Emmerson, Alex Demyanenko, Shaunie O'Neal, Jill Holmes, Tom Huffman, and Sean Rankine.

The show chronicles the lives of a group of women who are the wives and girlfriends, or have been romantically linked to, professional basketball players in the National Basketball Association, though the title of the series does not make this differentiation, solely referring to the women as "wives".

== Production ==
Basketball Wives debuted on April 11, 2010, with thirty-minute episodes. The second season premiered on December 12, 2010, with expanded sixty-minute episodes and featured new cast member Tami Roman. Season 3 made its debut on May 30, 2011, with new cast member Meeka Claxton. The fourth season premiered on February 20, 2012, with two new cast members, Kenya Bell and Kesha Nichols and the departure of Claxton. The fifth season premiered on August 19, 2013, with Tasha Marbury joining the cast. According to a tweet from Tami Roman, the show has been quietly though officially cancelled.

== Cast ==
=== Main cast ===
- Royce Reed: Ex-Dancer for Miami/Orlando
- Meeka Claxton: Wife of Speedy Claxton
- Suzie Ketcham: Ex-Girlfriend of Michael Olowokandi
- Tami Roman: Ex-Wife of Kenny Anderson
- Jennifer Williams: Wife of Eric Williams
- Evelyn Lozada: Ex-Fiancée of Antoine Walker
- Shaunie O'Neal: Ex-Wife of Shaquille O'Neal

=== Recurring cast ===
- Ashley Walker: Mother of Rafer Alston's child

== Episodes ==
No. overall	No. in season	Title	Original release date	U.S. viewers (millions)
23	1	"Season Premiere"	May 30, 2011	1.83
While Royce is at odds with Evelyn, Jen and Tami are bent on preventing Evelyn from profiting off the hurtful phrase that launched their season-ending brawl. Is it too late to make amends? Meeka Claxton is added to the opening credits.
24	2	"Episode 2"	June 6, 2011	1.75
Suzie's return to the circle upsets Royce. Also, sparks fly when Tami takes Meeka to task for playing both sides.
25	3	"Episode 3"	June 13, 2011	1.86
Royce's father raises concerns about his daughter's new boyfriend. Also, Evelyn checks out a fertility clinic as she prepares to begin a family with Chad Ochocinco.
26	4	"Episode 4"	June 20, 2011	1.63
Jen's curiosity and suspicions are piqued when Eric wants to take a meeting with Suzie. Also, more than mallets are swinging when Tami and Meeka get into it at an upscale polo event.
27	5	"Episode 5"	June 27, 2011	1.73
A trip to the Big Apple turns sour as Evelyn and Tami's beef over Ev's T-shirts resurfaces. Also, Jen agrees to her first date since splitting with Eric and Evelyn reconciles with her long-absent father.
28	6	"Episode 6"	July 11, 2011	1.86
Shaunie makes waves when she proposes another international girls' trip but excludes Royce from the guest list.
29	7	"Episode 7"	July 18, 2011	2.04
It's an Italian vacation complete with extra baggage as Evelyn's reaction to a radio interview given by Jen threatens to end their friendship and Tami and Meeka butt heads over loose talk and leaving Royce behind.
30	8	"Episode 8"	July 25, 2011	2.33
The ladies' trip to Italy explodes as Tami's feud with Meeka reaches the boiling point, and one member of the circle calls it quits over the drama.
31	9	"Episode 9"	August 1, 2011	2.01
Royce's meeting with Eric makes Jen's blood boil. Chad surprises Evelyn with a unique outing, and Jen finds chemistry on a blind date set up by pal Al Reynolds.
32	10	"Season Finale"	August 8, 2011	2.60
Chad and Evelyn get into it when Evelyn spots him having lunch with another woman. Also, Jen's wild divorce party heats up when her date for the evening arrives.
33	11	"Reunion: Part 1"	August 15, 2011	2.57
Host John Salley returns as he reunites the cast to break down the explosive season finale.
34	12	"Reunion: Part 2"	August 22, 2011	2.87
John Salley coaxes the ladies into dishing more dirt about their drama with Meeka and the status of Evelyn's relationship with Chad is also up for discussion. This episode marks the final appearance of Meeka.
