= Basketball Wives season 1 =

Basketball Wives
- Season 1
- DVD Cover
- Starring: Royce Reed; Suzie Ketcham; Gloria Govan; Jennifer Williams; Evelyn Lozada; Shaunie O'Neal
- No. of episodes: 9

Release
- Original network: VH1
- Original release: April 11 – June 20, 2010

Season chronology
- Next → Season 2

The first season of the reality television series Basketball Wives aired on VH1 from April 11, 2010 until June 20, 2010. The show was primarily filmed in Miami, Florida. It was executively produced by Nick Emmerson Alex Demyanenko, Shaunie O'Neal, Jill Holmes, Tom Huffman, and Sean Rankine.

The show chronicles the lives of a group of women who are the wives and girlfriends, or have been romantically linked to, professional basketball players in the National Basketball Association, though the title of the series does not make this differentiation, solely referring to the women as "wives".

== Production ==
Basketball Wives debuted on April 11, 2010, with thirty-minute episodes. The first season followed the lives of Royce Reed former cheerleader of Orlando and Miami, Suzie Ketcham ex-girlfriend of Michael Olowokandi, Gloria Govan fiancée of Matt Barnes, Jennifer Williams wife of Eric Williams, Evelyn Lozada fiancee of Antoine Walker, and Shaunie O'Neal wife of Shaquille O'Neal. With Erika Moxxam joining the recurring cast.

== Cast ==
=== Main cast ===
- Royce Reed: Ex-Dancer for Miami Heat & Orlando Magic
- Suzie Ketcham: Ex-Girlfriend of Michael Olowokandi
- Gloria Govan: Fiancée of Matt Barnes
- Jennifer Williams: Wife of Eric Williams
- Evelyn Lozada: Ex-Fiancée of Antoine Walker
- Shaunie O'Neal: Wife of Shaquille O'Neal

=== Recurring cast ===
- Erikka Moxam: Ex-Girlfriend of Rasual Butler

== Episodes ==
No. overall	No. in season	Title	Original release date	U.S. viewers (millions)
1	1	"Series Premiere"	April 11, 2010	1.58
Fresh off her highly publicized filing for divorce from megastar basketball legend Shaquille O'Neal, Shaunie O'Neal returns to Miami for a night out with fellow basketball wives and girlfriends.
2	2	"Episode 2"	April 18, 2010	1.39
Evelyn throws herself a lavish 34th birthday party, which well-meaning Royce nearly tanks with a surprise dance routine. Also, Jen struggles with the idea of sticking it out in her troubled marriage to Eric Williams.
3	3	"Episode 3"	April 25, 2010	1.28
Evelyn and Jen leave Miami to visit basketball fiancée Gloria Govan and her soon-to-be hubby Matt Barnes in Orlando. When Jen and Evelyn engage the couple in a discussion of why athletes cheat, drama ensues.
4	4	"Episode 4"	May 2, 2010	1.36
Emotions get heated and things quickly take an ugly turn when Gloria defends her sister's role in an alleged scandal involving Shaunie. Meanwhile, Jen and Eric look to solve their marital issues with a new luxury home.
5	5	"Episode 5"	May 9, 2010	1.23
Suzie's efforts to fix up newly-single Evelyn with a local producer crashes with a thud, but not as fast as the relationship between Royce and Gloria once Royce finds out Gloria's been talking about her behind her back.
6	6	"Episode 6"	May 16, 2010	1.30
Jen's upcoming Haiti benefit inspires Royce to invite the girls to make a difference on a personal level at a local soup kitchen, though Evelyn finds her motives suspect.
7	7	"Episode 7"	May 23, 2010	1.24
Shaunie returns to Miami to check up on the girls, and galpal Erikka is surprised by lingering feelings when she's reunited with ex-boyfriend and professional basketball player, Rasual Butler.
8	8	"Season Finale"	May 30, 2010	0.91
Shaunie gives the girls a break from the Miami heat in her new hometown, Los Angeles. But all of them wind up in the hot seat during a season-ending dinner conversation that ends with almost everyone in tears. This episode marks the final regular Appearance of Gloria.
9	9	"The Reunion"	June 20, 2010	1.04
Host Tanika Ray reunites as the cast returns to recap, reminisce, and revisit the dramatic first season. A surprise guest shows up, letting residue from a past dispute "spill" out onto the reunion stage.
