= Swirl Films =

American production company

- Industry: Entertainment
- Founded: 2001; 25 years ago
- Headquarters: Atlanta, Georgia, United States
- Key people: Eric Tomosunas
- Products: Motion pictures and television
- Owner: Gray Media (2020-present)
- Website: www.swirlfilms.com

Swirl Films is an American independent production company, based in Atlanta, Georgia. The company produced more than 60 made-for-TV films and direct-to-SVOD movies for BET, BET+, Netflix, TV One, Lifetime, Hallmark Channel and Up TV.

== History ==
Swirl Films was founded in 2001 by Eric Tomosunas. The company relocated from Wilmington, North Carolina to Atlanta in 2014. In 2020, television broadcast group Gray Media acquired Swirl Films.

== Selected credits ==
=== Feature films ===
- 20 Funerals (2004)
- Dead Heist (2007)
- Furnace (2007)
- Love for Sale (2008)
- Something Like a Business (2010)
- 35 and Ticking (2011)
- He's Mine Not Yours (2011)
- Note to Self (2012)
- The Undershepherd (2012)
- The Perfect Summer (2013)
- Favorite Son (2021)
- Horror Noire (2021)
- Hello (2022)
- My Name Is Mo'Nique (2023)

=== Television films ===
- Hear No Evil (2014)
- Love Under New Management: The Miki Howard Story (2016)
- When Love Kills: The Falicia Blakely Story (2017)
- Bobbi Kristina (2017)
- Our Dream Wedding (2021)
- Twisted House Sitter (2021)
- Kirk Franklin's A Gospel Christmas (2021)
- Girl in the Basement (2021)
- Don't Waste Your Pretty (2021)
- Suitcase Killer: The Melanie McGuire Story (2022)
- The Night Before Christmas (2022)
- Keyshia Cole This Is My Story (2023)
- Girl in the Closet (2023)
- Whatever It Takes (2023)

=== Television shows ===
- Unsung (2008–)
- Born Again Virgin (2015–2016)
- Here We Go Again (2016)
- Donnie After Dark (2016)
- Saints & Sinners (2016–2022)
- Haus of Vicious (2022)
- Judge Me Not (2023)
