= Erica Page =

American actress and model

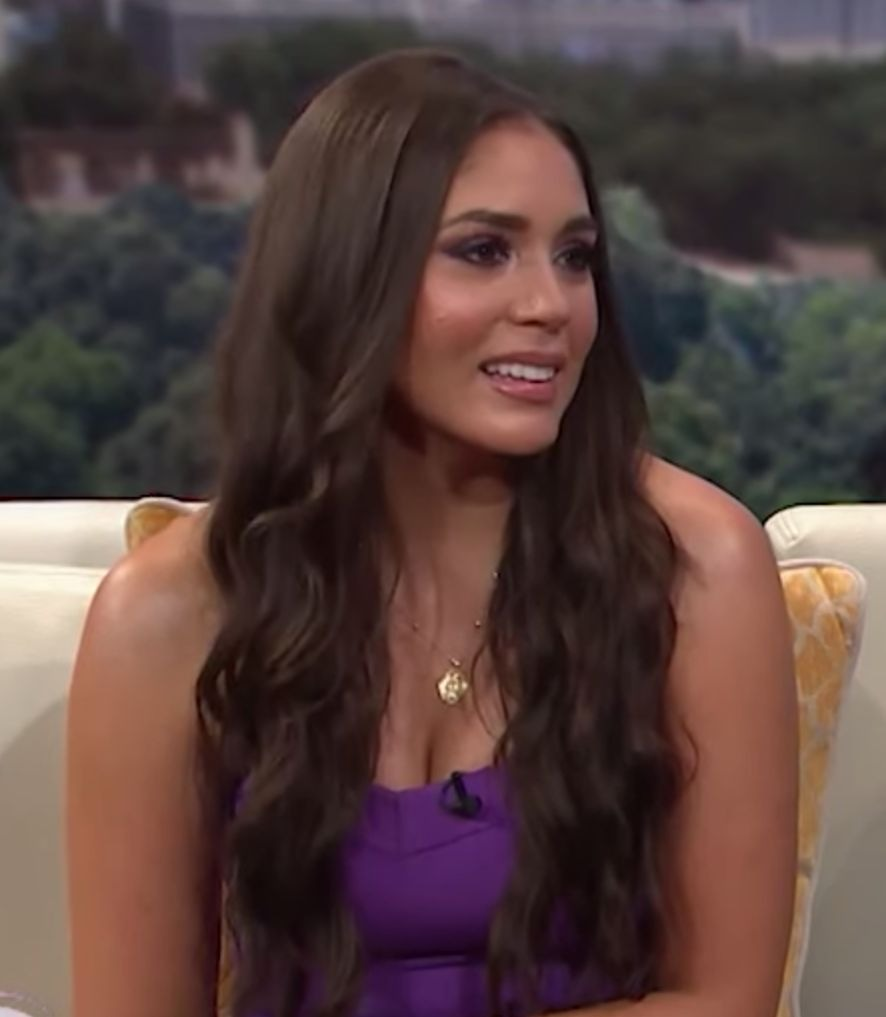
- Page in 2019
- Born: U.S
- Occupation: Actress
- Years active: 2011–present

Erica Page is an American actress and model. She is known for her role as Bella Tru in the Oprah Winfrey Network prime time soap opera, Ambitions.

== Life and career ==
Page is the oldest of nine children and comes from Mexican/American heritage. She began her career with a recurring role in the BET comedy series The Game in 2012, and later played secondary roles in Sleepy Hollow, The Vampire Diaries, Saints & Sinners, and Nashville. Her film credits including Mr. Right (2015), Blue Mountain State: The Rise of Thadland (2016) and Office Christmas Party (2016).

In 2018, Page had a recurring role in the Oprah Winfrey Network prime time soap opera If Loving You Is Wrong and guest-starred in the CW prime time soap opera Dynasty. In 2019, Page was cast in two series regular roles. First, on the Bounce TV comedy series Last Call opposite Charles Malik Whitfield and Brely Evans. Later that year, she began starring in the Oprah Winfrey Network prime time soap opera, Ambitions playing the role of fashion designer Bella Tru, the mistress of Atlanta Mayor Evan Lancaster (Brian J. White).

== Filmography ==
=== Film ===
Year	Title	Role	Notes
2012	No More Games	Gabby	
2012	Redemption 316	Loretta Jones	Short
2014	Bloated Minds	Laura	
2014	First Impression	Fran	
2014	Comeback Dad	Charlotte	
2014	Lyfe's Journey	Amy White	TV movie
2014	Breathe	Lisa Morales	
2014	The Cure	Kennedy Reed	
2015	Mr. Right	Maria	
2015	Thirsty the Movie	Charlotte Bradley	
2015	Love N Success	Stacy Beasley	
2015	Key Road	Ava	
2016	Blue Mountain State: The Rise of Thadland	Tina	
2016	Love Under New Management: The Miki Howard Story	Receptionist	
2016	Closet Space: The Movie	Linda	
2016	Bad Dad Rehab	Christine	TV movie
2016	Bring Out the Lady	Tatiana	TV movie
2016	Office Christmas Party	Drunk Woman #2	
2017	The Run Saga: Breathe	Lisa Morales	
2017	Slaw	Detective Sanchez	
2018	The Mothers	Teacher	Short
2018	The Killing Secret	Carla	
2018	Rosalind	Vivian	Short
2019	Summer Madness	Vernina Calloway	
2020	Life Without Hope	Trina	
2022	Hunther	Paula	
2023	Life Without Hope: A New Chapter	Trina	
2023	Christmas Holidate	Dianna	

=== Television ===
Year	Legacy	Role	Notes
2011-12	Osiris	Nicky	Recurring Cast
2012	The Game	Julie	Recurring Cast: Seasons 5
2012	Just Go 4 It	Jill Jones	Episode: "Episode #1.1"
2013	Sleepy Hollow	Chat Lady	Episode: "The Midnight Ride"
2015	Clairvoyance the Ellis Files	Natalia Ellis	Episode: "Charles Broderick Part 1 & 2"
2016	Homicide Hunter	Christina Massamba	Episode: "Murder Haunts Me"
2016	Swamp Murders	Dr. Gretchen Maras	Episode: "Shoeprints in the Mud"
2016	The Vampire Diaries	Bridal Clerk	Episode: "You Decided That I Was Worth Saving"
2017	Saints & Sinners	Nurse	Episode: "Playing Dirty"
2017	Nashville	Cowgirl Server	Episode: "Ghost in This House"
2018	MacGyver	Lucy	Episode: "Wind + Water"
2018	Ozark	Janet Rayner	Episode: "Once a Langmore..."
2018	Dynasty	Alt Cristal Flores	Episode: "Twenty-Three Skidoo"
2018-19	The Resident	Nurse Anne Huntington	Guest Cast: Season 1-2
2019	Last Call	Rachel Scott	Main Cast
2019	Ambitions	Bella Tru	Main Cast
2021	Covenant	Davina Reyes	Episode: "The Vow - Part 1 & 2"
2022	I Got a Story to Tell	Shanice	Episode: "If You Only Knew"
2023	BMF	Call Girl	Episode: "Both Sides of the Fence"
