= Whatever It Takes (2023 film) =

Christmas film by Tailiah Breon

- Directed by: Tailiah Breon
- Written by: Amaleka McCall; Tu-Shonda Whitaker
- Produced by: James DuBose; Tami Roman
- Starring: Tami Roman; A.J. Johnson; Brely Evans; Kandi Burruss
- Cinematography: Roger Alexander
- Edited by: Charles Jones
- Music by: Ozzy Doniz
- Production companies: Swirl Films; Roman Ramsey Productions
- Distributed by: BET+
- Release date: December 21, 2023
- Running time: 90 minutes
- Country: United States
- Language: English

Whatever It Takes is a 2023 American Christmas comedy-drama film directed by Tailiah Breon and written by Amaleka McCall and Tu-Shonda Whitaker. The film stars Tami Roman, A.J. Johnson, Brely Evans, and Kandi Burruss. It follows the lives of four women navigating new beginnings during the Christmas weekend. The film executive produced by Tami Roman and her Roman Ramsey Productions, James DuBose and Swirl Films. Whatever It Takes was released by BET+ on December 21, 2023.

== Cast ==
- Tami Roman as Tracy
- A.J. Johnson as Alafia
- Brely Evans as India
- Kandi Burruss as Joan
- Zuri James as Devin Jr
- Kendrick Cross as Devin Sr
- Rayan Lawrence as Juju
- Stevie Baggs Jr. as Samaad
- Linda Boston as Ethel 'Mama' Woods
- Katherine Ro as Emma Andrews
- Avangeline Friedlander as Jasmine

== Production ==
On May 16, 2023, it was reported that Tami Roman will executive produce and star in the BET+ holiday film Whatever It Takes from Swirl Films and her production company, Roman Ramsey Productions. Kandi Burruss, Brely Evans, Kendrick Cross, Rayan Lawrence, Zuri James, Stevie Baggs Jr, Linda Boston, Monica Robinson and AJ Johnson round out the cast of the movie directed by Tailiah Breon.
