= The Real World: Los Angeles =

Season of television series

Coordinates: 33°58′48″N 118°28′00″W

- Season 2
- The initial cast of The Real World: Los Angeles
- Starring: Dominic Griffin; Tami Roman; Jon Brennan; Beth Stolarczyk; Aaron Behle; Irene Berrera; David Edwards; Glen Naessens; Beth Anthony
- No. of episodes: 21

Release
- Original network: MTV
- Original release: June 26 – November 11, 1993

Season chronology
- ← Previous; The Real World: New York Next → The Real World: San Francisco

The Real World: California (retrospectively referred to as The Real World: Los Angeles, to distinguish it from subsequent installments of the series set elsewhere in California) is the second season of MTV's reality television series The Real World, which focuses on a group of diverse strangers living together for several months, as the cameras follow their lives and interpersonal relationships. It is the first season of The Real World to be filmed in the Pacific States region of the United States, specifically in California.

The season featured a total of nine cast members over the course of the season, as one cast member was evicted and replaced, and another was replaced when she got married. The Real World expanded from 13 to 21 episodes with this season. Production for the season was from February to June 1993. This is the first of two seasons to be filmed in Los Angeles. In 2008, filming of the twentieth season again took place in Los Angeles, this time in the district of Hollywood.

The season, which documented 22 weeks of the cast's interactions, began with two cast members being flown to Nashville and then spending ten days driving cross country to their Venice Beach house in a Winnebago, picking up a third cast member in Owensboro, Kentucky along the way.

== Season changes ==
When this season first aired in 1993, the original title for this season was The Real World: California. Years later, the season's title was retroactively changed to The Real World: Los Angeles, mainly to avoid confusion with later seasons filmed in California (San Francisco, San Diego, and Hollywood). The show also expanded from 13 half-hour episodes to 21.

This season was the only one in which two housemates, Tami and Dominic, picked up a third housemate, Jon, at his home in a state other than the one in which the show would be set, and traveled to their new home in a Winnebago RV. Journeying in a Winnebago would later become a regular motif on the spinoff show, Road Rules. This was the first season in which cast members left the show during filming: David Edwards, who was asked to leave by his housemates, and Irene Berrera-Kearns, because she got married. Consequently, it was the first season to feature a season total of more than seven cast members, as two additional castmates, Glen Naessens and Beth Anthony, moved in to replace Edwards and Berrera-Kearns. In what would become the norm for The Real World, the entire cast was sent on a trip abroad, whereas in the previous season, only the women were.

The house in which the cast lived now featured a small sound proof room for the weekly "confessional" cast interviews, and became known itself by that name.

== Residence ==
The Venice Beach house where the cast resided

The $2 million (1993 dollars), three-story, 4,520-square-foot (420 m^{2}), four bedroom, four bathroom house is located at 30 30th Avenue in Venice Beach, one block east of the beach. According to the owner, after the filming of the series was complete, the interior and exterior of the house were repainted back to their original pink color. The only room not to be repainted was the room that was renovated into the Confessional room, which was painted blue with white clouds for the filming of the series. When the current owners purchased the house in 1996, the house was painted light blue/gray with a white trim and the interior pink carpeting was changed to gray. A sign outside the house read:

"This area is being used by Bunim-Murray Productions for taping of a television program. By your entrance into this area and your presence, you give unqualified consent to Bunim-Murray to record, use and publicize your voice, actions, likeness and appearance in any manner in connection with the program. If you do not wish to be taped as part of the program, please exit the area until all taping has been completed."

== Cast ==
Cast member	Age (Note: Age at the time of filming.)	Hometown
Aaron Behle	21	San Clemente, California
Aaron is a business/economics major at UCLA, where he enjoys difficult, cutthroat classes, and already has a job lined up for the next fall as a Certified Public Accountant. He was student body president and President of the National Honor Society. He loves to surf, appreciates the diversity of the people in Los Angeles, but his conservative politics are at odds with the liberalism of the area. Aaron voted for George H. W. Bush, and isn't happy about having a Democrat in the White House, remarking that Bill Clinton may be the "antichrist". Despite his conservatism, he is pro-choice on abortion, as is his girlfriend, Erin, which provides conflict with Jon in Episode 10. He has a brother who is engaged to be married. He rooms with Dominic, with whom he becomes best friends, despite their different politics. Jon thinks Aaron enjoys a good confrontation as an opportunity to get his point across, but says that Aaron engages in one-sided discussions in which he refuses to listen to other people, making it impossible to talk to him, a point echoed by Tami and conceded by Aaron himself.
Beth Stolarczyk	24	Garfield Heights, Ohio
Beth is a graduate of Ohio University, where she studied film, television and radio production. She is an avid fan of the entertainment industry, and is in Los Angeles to pursue her career, to meet new people, and challenge herself. She works as a production assistant, in a casting office, and in craft services, but hopes one day to be a producer, director and actor. The death of her father, to whom she was much closer than her mother, was the hardest thing she ever experienced, and has still not been to his grave. She also has a sister, though her mother did not speak to her for a considerable time when Beth was in a relationship with an abusive boyfriend, who continues to call her demanding to see her. Her mother, Eugenia, a Polish-American radio host for WERE (1300 AM), works constantly, even doing shows on Christmas, and does not express her feelings often, which is why Beth feels they are not that close, even though she loves her mother very much. Beth discusses this when her mother visits the house in Episode 19. According to MTV, her friends describe her as a "drama queen" whose life is like a soap opera. The rest of the cast affirms this label, including Dominic, who characterizes her as "animated", and Aaron, who calls her a "psycho". She eventually grows close to Jon and Tami, forming a trio by the cast trip to Mexico. Though Tami thinks Beth is the cast member most ready to settle down, Beth says that she has not had sex in a long time, because finding a suitable man in Los Angeles is difficult. Glen, however, develops an intense animosity toward Beth by Episodes 18 and 19, seeing her as selfish, and "a mess", leading the two to attempt a dialogue in the latter episode.
David Edwards	21	Washington D.C.
David is a stand-up comedian who has been in Los Angeles for a couple of months, having worked in local clubs, and appeared on FOX's In Living Color. He is meticulous in taking care of his clothes, he explains, because he grew up poor, and his mother had to scavenge dumpsters for basic necessities. He experiences a number of differences with his roommate, Jon, over things ranging from musical tastes, household duties and racial stereotypes, and his perception of the cliques in the house cause him to come into conflict with the others as well. Jon believes that as a comedian, David is always trying to be funny and acts out as if in front of an audience, much to Jon's irritation. After David pulls bedcovers off an underwear-clad Tami as a joke in Episode 6, which develops into a serious matter among the housemates, the cast evicts him in Episode 7.
Dominic Griffin	24	Dublin, Ireland
Dominic is a writer who writes television reviews for Variety and several music columns for other magazines, though most of his income comes from bartending. Dominic, who was born and raised in Dublin first came to the United States at age 17 for a vacation, but liked the weather and people so much he that decided to stay. He is distinguished by his spiked black hair and according to MTV, a good sense of humor. He has a younger sister named Barbara and more than one brother, though he has not always been as close to his father as he would have liked. In Episode 13, returns home to visit his mother and ailing father. He says he is "severely addicted" to nicotine, and his castmates sometimes express the feeling that he drinks too much. He has a German Shepherd named George, and hates cats, which provides a potential problem when he moves in with Beth, who has a cat. He rooms with Aaron, who becomes his best friend, despite their differences in politics and lifestyle, though the others feels the two form a clique from they are excluded. Dominic says that his knowledge comes from experience, whereas Aaron's is derived from books. He says he feels "very claustrophobic" when it comes to relationships, explaining that he gets bored and restless after being with the same woman after a while, and prefers to move on to explore other women.
Irene Berrera-Kearns	25	Covina, California
Irene is a Deputy Sheriff for the Los Angeles County Sheriff's Department who works as a courtroom bailiff, delivering subpoenas, and handling evictions. She serves as the "mom" of the house, and develops a close relationship with Jon. Her fiancé, Tim, is also a Deputy, whom she met at work, and their wedding in Episode 11 is one of the highlights of the season. Irene has a predilection for blonde-haired men, leading her to think that Tim is jealous when they meet Aaron upon moving in. She becomes depressed in Tim's absence, but becomes good friends with Jon, whom she says makes her laugh, and defends him from Aaron's taunts. Tami describes Irene as the most stable member of the household.
Jon Brennan	18	Owensboro, Kentucky
Jon, who is the youngest cast member, comes from a devout Christian household that does not keep alcohol in the house, and feels out of place in cities like Las Vegas or Los Angeles. Though he enjoys his time in Los Angeles, he is not willing to undergo the lifestyle change he feels would be necessary to live there. He is a country singer taking a semester off from Belmont University to pursue his music career in Los Angeles. Back home, he is a local celebrity who performs regularly at Goldie's Best Little Opry House in Owensboro, and hopes one day to be a successful recording artist. He did not get very good grades in school, and says he can't imagine having a conventional job. He has a sister and a brother named Buck, and though he commands a crowd while performing, offstage he says he never had any "close, close friends". Though he sings and plays the guitar, he has no interest in writing, which puts him with odds with the prevailing career wisdom he encounters in Los Angeles. He becomes known for drinking copious amounts of Kool-Aid, and for his outspoken conservative views, as he is a devout, anti-abortion Christian who has never smoked, consumed alcohol or had sex. He experiences a number of differences with his roommate, David, over things ranging from musical tastes, household duties and racial stereotypes, and Jon's irritation with what he perceives as David's constant acting out for attention. Jon becomes closest to Irene, who says that she understands the isolation he feels in Los Angeles, and takes offense at the constant jokes with which Aaron degrades Jon, though Dominic says it is merely good-natured ribbing. Jon calls her "Mom", and she and Tim spend a weekend with Jon in her hometown, whose more modest pace compared to LA reminds Jon of his own home. Though Jon and Tami's first meeting is marked by conflict over their differences, they eventually become good friends by Episode 18, forming a trio with Beth S. Beth S. opines that of the entire cast, Jon has changed the most by the end of the season, pointing to his exposure to a different city and different lifestyles, a point echoed by Beth A. and Jon himself.
Tami Akbar (later Roman)	22	Mount Vernon, New York
Tami is an alumna of Howard University and a singer who works as an AIDS care specialist, which proves difficult when patients she grows close to get sick and die. Her true aspiration is music, as she is a member in a four-woman R&B group called Reality. She is extremely close to her mother, who had her when she was fifteen and half, and thinks of her almost as a sister rather than as a mother. When Tami was a senior in high school, she and her mother were homeless for three months following the loss of her mother's job, and struggled to procure basic necessities as they lived in her mother's car before Tami's mother managed to get their lives back on track. Though Tami was raised a Muslim, she begins each day with a Buddhist chant to ensure peace and serenity. She appeared on the dating game show Studs a year ago, and appears again on the program in Episode 4. David feels that she is spoiled when it comes to men, and only dates men who submit to her control and her demands, though she says she isn't certain what she wants in terms of relationship, and that she has trouble seeing herself marrying or being with any one person. In Episode 11, she has an abortion, sparking discussions on that topic among the cast. Tami sees herself as extremely neat, and when Beth A. first moves in, she sees Tami as very controlling, and sometimes harsh, owing to the various issues going on in Tami's life. Despite her initial differences with Jon and Beth S, the three eventually become a close trio by Episode 18.
Glen Naessens	22	Philadelphia, Pennsylvania
Glen, whom MTV describes as "intense", was chosen from three candidates to replace David after his eviction. Glen is the lead singer of an alternative band named Perch. Although he and Jon get along well when he first moves in, Glen later laments that he hasn't really bonded with the cast as he has with his friends back home, and invites his band out to L.A. to spend time at the house. He loves basketball, and though does night gigs with Perch "just for the hell of it", he makes money by working days at a record store, and hopes to become a filmmaker. He is Catholic, and feels that he is "close to God", who he sees as his best friend, though he respects religious diversity. He says he has trouble being with any one woman for a prolonged period of time, as he tends to tire of them. He also says that he is normally shy, but becomes good friends with Beth A. He develops an intense animosity toward Beth Stolarczyk by Episodes 18 and 19, seeing her as selfish, and "a mess", leading the two to attempt a dialogue in the latter episode.
Beth Anthony	22	Eugene, Oregon
Beth A., who joins the cast in Episode 12 after Irene gets married, works as a production assistant, doing scenic painting and craft services work. She is a recovering alcoholic and member of Alcoholics Anonymous. MTV describes her as "soft-spoken", and she describes herself as having "dignity and integrity". Her status as a lesbian causes Tami to ponder her own biases when she first moves in. She becomes close friends with Glen, who says he appreciates her sincerity and depth.

=== Duration of cast ===
Cast members	Episodes																				
Cast members	1	2	3	4	5	6	7	8	9	10	11	12	13	14	15	16	17	18	19	20	21
Dominic	Featured	Featured	Featured	Featured	Featured	Featured	Featured	Featured	Featured	Featured	Featured	Featured	Featured	Featured	Featured	Featured	Featured	Featured	Featured	Featured	Featured
Jon	Featured	Featured	Featured	Featured	Featured	Featured	Featured	Featured	Featured	Featured	Featured	Featured	Featured	Featured	Featured	Featured	Featured	Featured	Featured	Featured	Featured
Tami	Featured	Featured	Featured	Featured	Featured	Featured	Featured	Featured	Featured	Featured	Featured	Featured	Featured	Featured	Featured	Featured	Featured	Featured	Featured	Featured	Featured
Beth S.		Entered (Note: In Episode 1, only 3 of the 7 cast members were introduced. The other 4 cast members were introduced in Episode 2.)	Featured	Featured	Featured	Featured	Featured	Featured	Featured	Featured	Featured	Featured	Featured	Featured	Featured	Featured	Featured	Featured	Featured	Featured	Featured
Aaron		Entered	Featured	Featured	Featured	Featured	Featured	Featured	Featured	Featured	Featured	Featured	Featured	Featured	Featured	Featured	Featured	Featured	Featured	Featured	Featured
Glen							Entered (Note: David was kicked out of the house in Episode 7 after all of the cast members voted him out of the house. Glen replaced David in Episode 7.)	Featured	Featured	Featured	Featured	Featured	Featured	Featured	Featured	Featured	Featured	Featured	Featured	Featured	Featured
Beth A.												Entered (Note: Irene left the house in Episode 12 after getting married. Beth A. replaced Irene in Episode 12.)	Featured	Featured	Featured	Featured	Featured	Featured	Featured	Featured	Featured
Irene		Entered	Featured	Featured	Featured	Featured	Featured	Featured	Featured	Featured	Featured	Left									
David		Entered	Featured	Featured	Featured	Featured	Kicked														

== Episodes ==
No. overall	No. in season	Title	Original release date
14	1	"Boot Scootin' Boogie"	June 26, 1993
As the New York cast initially offers their predictions and advice for the new Los Angeles cast, Dominic picks up Tami in Nashville, and they drive across country in a Winnebago to pick up Jon in Kentucky, though they stay to watch him perform first. The three get to know one another on the way to LA, and as they begin to form opinions about one another, Jon makes a comment about Tami and Dominic that they see as derogatory.
15	2	"To a New Beginning..."	July 1, 1993
As Dominic, Tami and Jon continue their trip to LA, Tami takes issue with Dominic's tendency to go off on his own and bring back women to the Winnebago, and her and Jon's mutual biases emerge and lead to a heated exchange of epithets. After getting to Venice Beach and meeting Aaron, Irene, David and Beth, at the season house, the trio decide to put the road trip behind them, and begin with a blank slate.
16	3	"Too Many Cat Fights in This House"	July 8, 1993
Tami risks driving with a suspended license, a result of $2,000 in unpaid parking tickets, though Irene affirms that she will act according to her role as a Sheriff's Deputy if she sees illegal activity when off-duty. Jon and David's relationship alternates between amenability and disagreements over music, household duties and perceptions of racial stereotypes. Dominic is similarly irritated with Beth, first because of the intrusion of her cat into his personal space, and then when the cast is turned away from a Beverly Hills party to which she informed them they were invited.
17	4	"David, David, David"	July 15, 1993
David and Tami argue over the inclusion of his visiting friends from Chicago on an outing, and his perception that she is spoiled. Feeling she needs to improve her social life, Tami goes out on two dates as part of her second appearance on the dating game Studs. A miscommunication over a night out leads to an explosive public argument between David, Irene and Dominic, with accusations of cliquism, lack of consideration and feelings of persecution leveled among the three. David further comes into conflict with Beth over household cleanliness and courtesy over use of the phone, while Jon thinks David is always playing to an audience, and is difficult to get along with, and David sees the cast's attempt to discuss their differences with him as gangpiling.
18	5	"Different Strokes for Different ..."	July 22, 1993
Tami's appearance on Studs does not go as planned. Jon and Beth ponder Aaron and Dominic's unlikely friendship, which Jon, Irene and Beth feel has become a clique from which others are excluded. The cast comes to think that Beth is a "drama queen" who exaggerates trivial matters. Aaron and David are perplexed at Jon, who stays home all day and declines their offers of assistance in finding work. Irene takes umbrage at Aaron's constant jokes at Jon's expense, though Dominic says it is merely good-natured ribbing. Irene's fiance Tim suggests that he and Irene spend a weekend in her hometown with Jon, which includes a performance by Jon at a country bar.
19	6	"Is David Going Home?"	July 29, 1993
David pulls the blankets off an underwear-clad Tami as a joke, but an outraged Tami retaliates, and the ensuing argument is further exacerbated David's exposing himself and Beth's comparison of David's explanation to the rationalization of a rapist. David, who perceived Tami herself to have been amused by his actions, objects to this characterization, while Tami objects to what she sees as a lack of sympathy by the other men. After Tami temporarily leaves the house, the cast discusses the matter, with the women demanding that David move out.
20	7	"No Apologies Necessary"	August 5, 1993
David attempts to speak privately with the women, who steadfastly decline, and insist he move out. David argues that Beth peeking at Dominic's boxer shorts in Episode 5 merits her own eviction, but she points out that she did not expose Dominic to others or to the camera, and that he walks around in his boxers frequently. As the rest of the cast continue to discuss Beth's rape comparison, and possible damage to David's career, David eventually moves out.
21	8	"The New Roommate"	August 12, 1993
The cast auditions three people to be their new roommate, and selects Glen, an aspiring filmmaker who works in a record store by day and spends nights singing in a band.
22	9	"Is This Group Bonding?"	August 19, 1993
The group goes on a camping trip to Joshua Tree National Park, where they butt heads with their guides, whom the cast feel are neither competent nor forthcoming with their itinerary, and who infantilize the cast. Beth serves as the victim in a simulated mountain rescue. An acrophobic Tami, who does not take well to climbing, lashes out at the more adept Aaron, and during the course of the trip, reveals that she is pregnant.
23	10	"Pro-Choice or Pro-Life?"	August 26, 1993
Tami informs that cast that she is pregnant, and that she will have an abortion. Tami's mother is angry and devastated that Tami, who works in an AIDS health care center where condoms are ubiquitous, neglected to use them. Although the cast is supportive of Tami's decision, discussion on the topic ensues, in particular between Jon, who is anti-abortion, and Aaron and his visiting girlfriend, Erin, who are pro-choice. As Tami deals with the aftermath of the surgery, her mother explains that she would have had an abortion had they been legal in 1970, but in retrospect is glad that they were illegal, given how positively Tami has defined her life. The episode was preceded by an advisory title card that read: This is the real world where sometimes we face life's serious and sobering struggles. This episode examines one of the most complex, controversial and painful of these struggles. VIEWER DISCRETION IS ADVISED.
24	11	"Wedding Bells Ring"	September 2, 1993
As Irene and the rest of the cast make final preparations for her wedding, Beth and the cast learn that Aaron posed for a Men of Westwood calendar, which he had previously denied, and plaster the entire house with photocopies of his calendar photo, much to his dismay. In attending Irene's wedding, the cast ponders their own future weddings, and observe how Jon, who was closest to Irene, is particularly saddened by her departure, and speculate on his feelings for her.
25	12	"No More Practical Jokes"	September 9, 1993
As a prank, the cast leads Dominic to believe that his car has been towed. Beth A. moves in to replace Irene, and spends time with Beth S., Jon and Glen, though her being a lesbian causes Tami to ponder her own biases. A homesick Glen, who feels that he hasn't bonded with the rest the cast as he has with his friends back home, enjoys a visit from his Perch bandmates, who pursue career opportunities.
26	13	"To My Roomies..."	September 16, 1993
Dominic returns to Ireland to spend time with his ailing father, with whom he has not been as close as he would have liked, and in so doing, must deal with issues of mortality that he has never faced before. Investigating appropriate singing venues, which proves difficult in Los Angeles, Jon competes in a country singing contest, impressing his housemates and tying for first place.
27	14	"Troubling Careers"	September 23, 1993
Beth pursues acting work, but her head shots do not go over well with an agent. She takes an acting class, and later helps put on a play as a showcase for casting directors and agents. Tami's music career continues to face struggles, including body issues and a demanding producer. Tami's coworker puts on an AIDS prevention seminar at the house, though Tami decides to quit the health care center, as the death of patients close to her has taken a toll on her. Feeling uncertain and unhappy, she consults a psychic, takes a class at ITT Technical Institute, and has her jaw wired shut to lose weight.
28	15	"Home Away from Home"	September 30, 1993
After Jon meets with a producer and director about casting him in a film whose lead character is a country singer, he flies home to visit his family. Aaron shows Dominic and Glen around the UCLA campus, and later takes Dom surfing. Jon reflects on his time in LA, saying that although the experience has changed him for the better, it is not his home, as he does not wish to undergo the lifestyle change that living there would effect upon him.
29	16	"Truth or Dare?"	October 7, 1993
The cast grows irritated by the imposition of Glen's friends, in particular his bandmates, whom Glen invites to stay at the house. When a meeting over this leads to the mutual accusation between Glen and the rest of the cast that neither has attempted to get to know the other, the cast attempts to remedy this with a grab bag of anonymously written personal questions. This and other group activities, such as making sandwiches for the homeless, helps the cast bond.
30	17	"Let the Dating Games Begin!"	October 14, 1993
Beth and Tami both experience romantic difficulties, while the rest of the cast discuss their past and possible future relationships as well, in particular Aaron, who spends some time with female friends, as do the other men when the cast throw a party. Glen and Beth A. grow close.
31	18	"Dom and His Drinking"	October 21, 1993
The cast is sent on a trip to Mexico. Jon, Tami and Beth S. observe how much closer they have grown since their initial meeting, though after some group activities, the cast's dissatisfaction with some of Jon and Beth S.'s antics cause the group to break into their usual cliques, which leads to conflict. The cast is also troubled by Dominic's excessive drinking.
32	19	"Beth Puts the Smackdown in Paint..."	October 28, 1993
Beth S. is troubled by her ex-boyfriend, who repeatedly calls her demanding to see her. Beth's mother also visits, providing time for Beth to spend more time with her, and the others to gain insight into Beth. Beth also deals with harsh criticism from Glen and Aaron, though she receives support from Jon and Beth A. in her attempts to have a dialogue with them. The cast eventually relieves their group tension with a game of paintball, which Beth S. wins.
33	20	"The Musical Showcase"	November 4, 1993
Dominic arranges and emcees a musical showcase at which Jon, Glen's band, Perch, and Tami's R&B group, Reality, all perform. In attendance is Irene, as well as Tami's mother, who sees Tami perform publicly for the first time.
34	21	"Goodbye Roomies"	November 11, 1993
As filming comes to an end, the cast prepares to move out, deals with the effects of media exposure, and ponders the future. Aaron also prepares for his graduation, which is attended by the rest of the cast. Dominic's editor at Variety suggest that he write a piece on his experiences during filming. To appear less contentious, the cast does a group confessional, but ends up arguing and storming out.

== In popular culture ==
The show was satirized in the October 2, 1993 episode of the sketch comedy show, Saturday Night Live. The episode, which was hosted by Shannen Doherty, featured a skit depicting a Real World cast patterned after the Los Angeles cast, and poked fun at the discussions of racism, bigotry and political differences that served as a recurring theme that season.

The incident that led to David's eviction was parodied in a 1993 episode of the sketch comedy show, The Jon Stewart Show, with Jon Stewart portraying Tami in the skit.

A skit called The Mad Real World: Hoboken that appeared in a Season 1 episode of Chappelle's Show parodied The Real World franchise but is particularly aimed at the events of The Real World: Los Angeles. During the DVD commentary Dave Chappelle notes that he is a friend of David Edwards, and helped to get him on the cast of The Real World. He notes that much of the impetus for the Chappelle Show skit was his perception that the casts of The Real World often display their racist perceptions of African Americans, especially black men, as typified by the incident with Edwards.

== After filming ==
At the 2008 The Real World Awards Bash, David and Tami received a nomination for "Best Fight", David also received one in the "Gone Baby Gone" category, while Beth was in the running for the "Roommate You Love to Hate" award.

Beth Stolarczyk appeared nude in the May 2002 issue of Playboy magazine, along with other alumni of The Real World and Road Rules: Flora Alekseyeun, Veronica Portillo and Jisela Delgado. She produced, directed and starred in videos such as Reality TV's Sexiest Vixens, and the similarly-themed swimsuit calendars. She founded Planet Beth, an agency for reality TV stars. In 2008, she married Matt Ciriello and together they have two children: Julia and Nicholas.

Dominic Griffin continued his work in the entertainment industry, working as a senior editor at Film Threat magazine, a critic for Variety, and a radio show producer. He also founded a company that helps place music in movies, TV shows and video games. As of 2008, he is a music executive for Disney's TV and film projects.

Jon Brennan returned to his hometown, where as of 2008, he works as a church youth pastor, and performs as a singer/musician. As of 2021, he is still a virgin.

As of 2008, Irene Barrera-Kearns is still a deputy with the L.A. County Sheriff's Department, and a mother of two.

Tami Akbar worked as a model, financial executive and actress, appearing in various TV shows and movies. She married basketball player Kenny Anderson. They have two daughters, Lyric and Jazz, but they later divorced. Under the name Tami Roman, she appeared as a cast member on the VH1 reality television series Basketball Wives, which depicted her and her husband's attempt to salvage their relationship. She also appeared on the Basketball Wives spinoff, Basketball Wives LA.

In 2021, seven of the original nine cast members (excluding Aaron Behle and Dominic Griffin) reunited for The Real World Homecoming: Los Angeles.

=== The Challenge ===
Cast member	Seasons of The Challenge	Other appearances
Aaron Behle	—N/a	—N/a
Beth Stolarczyk	Challenge, Battle of the Seasons (2002), Battle of the Sexes, The Inferno II, The Gauntlet 2, The Duel, The Gauntlet III	The Challenge: All Stars (season 1), The Challenge: All Stars (season 3), The Challenge: All Stars (season 5)
David Edwards	Battle of the Sexes	—N/a
Dominic Griffin	—N/a	—N/a
Irene Berrera-Kearns	—N/a	—N/a
Jon Brennan	Road Rules: All Stars, Battle of the Seasons (2002), The Inferno II	—N/a
Tami Akbar	—N/a	—N/a
Glen Naessens	—N/a	—N/a
Beth Anthony	—N/a	—N/a

David Edwards served as Mr. Big on the second season of The Challenge
