= Livin' Lozada =

American reality television series

- Genre: Reality
- Starring: Evelyn Lozada; Shaniece Hairston
- Country of origin: United States
- Original language: English
- No. of seasons: 2
- No. of episodes: 16

Production
- Camera setup: Multiple
- Running time: 42 minutes

Original release
- Network: Oprah Winfrey Network
- Release: July 11, 2015 – June 25, 2016

Livin' Lozada is an American reality television series starring Evelyn Lozada and her daughter, Shaniece Hairston. It premiered on July 11, 2015, on the Oprah Winfrey Network, as part of its Saturday-night reality lineup.

== Episodes ==
=== Series overview ===
| Season | Episodes | Originally released | |
| Season | Episodes | First released | Last released |
|---|---|---|---|
| 1 | 8 | July 11, 2015 | August 29, 2015 |
| 2 | 8 | May 7, 2016 | June 25, 2016 |

=== Season 1 (2015) ===
| No. overall | No. in season | Title | Original release date | U.S. viewers (millions) |
|---|---|---|---|---|
| 1 | 1 | "Don't Call It a Comeback" | July 11, 2015 | 0.53 |
| 2 | 2 | "What Would Beyoncé Do?" | July 18, 2015 | 0.40 |
| 3 | 3 | "Let Her Skin That Knee" | July 25, 2015 | 0.56 |
| 4 | 4 | "Healing Old Wounds" | August 1, 2015 | 0.39 |
| 5 | 5 | "Back to the Bronx" | August 8, 2015 | 0.49 |
| 6 | 6 | "Your Energy Sucks" | August 15, 2015 | 0.47 |
| 7 | 7 | "There's No Hiding from Iyanla" | August 22, 2015 | 0.51 |
| 8 | 8 | "Something Better to Come" | August 29, 2015 | 0.61 |

=== Season 2 (2016) ===
| No. overall | No. in season | Title | Original release date | U.S. viewers (millions) |
|---|---|---|---|---|
| 9 | 1 | "Ever Since I Left the City" | May 7, 2016 | 0.34 |
| 10 | 2 | "Houston, We Have a Problem" | May 14, 2016 | 0.31 |
| 11 | 3 | "Meet the Crawfords" | May 21, 2016 | 0.35 |
| 12 | 4 | "The Gift of John Edward" | May 28, 2016 | 0.31 |
| 13 | 5 | "Therapy for Shaniece" | June 4, 2016 | 0.38 |
| 14 | 6 | "Evelyn Needs Therapy Too" | June 11, 2016 | 0.34 |
| 15 | 7 | "It’s Not Personal, It’s Business" | June 18, 2016 | 0.30 |
| 16 | 8 | "IVF: I’m Very Forty" | June 25, 2016 | 0.36 |
