= Rayan Lawrence =

American actor and producer

- Born: Brooklyn, New York, U.S.
- Education: John Jay College of Criminal Justice
- Occupations: Actor, producer
- Years active: 2004–present

Rayan Lawrence is an American actor and producer. His most well-known roles include his roles as K-9 on BMF, Neil on Magnum P.I., Juju on Whatever It Takes, and Elliot in Underground.

== Biography ==
Lawrence was born in Brooklyn, New York. Initially wanting to become an FBI agent, he graduated with a bachelor's degree in criminal justice, with a minor in theater, from John Jay College of Criminal Justice in 2005. During his time in college, he played basketball and participated in theater.

Lawrence first began his career in acting by auditioning for a role for an ESPN commercial after participating in a promotional shoot at Kings Plaza. This was later followed by a role on All My Children. At the start of his career, he had worked both as an actor and a model. His influences in acting include Denzel Washington, who he referred to as his "idol". He would go on to play in various television shows and movies, including as Elliot in the 2016-2017 show Underground. He would also portray the rapper Treach in the 2017 bio-pic All Eyez on Me, during which he received rhymes from the real-life Treach for Lawrence's freestyles in the movie. He also played K-9 in the Starz show BMF, where he met the family of the person his character is based on.

== Filmography ==
=== Film ===
Year	Title	Role	Notes
2004	Unknown Soldier	Dancer	
2005	Exhibit 42	-	Short
2005	Frankenthug	Church Guard	Video
2006	Time and Time Again	Heru	Short
2006	Williamsburg	G-Train	
2006	Maya's Soul	Monte	
2006	The Trade Off	Nathan Bryant	
2006	The Engagement Party	Kareem	Short
2007	A Deeper Love	Kevin	
2007	Back Stab	Kurt	
2007	44	S.P.	
2007	Kiari	Payton Louis	Short
2007	STD: Sexually Transmitted Demons	Tyran	Short
2008	Street Revenge	K.C.	
2008	Cadillac Records	Harmonica Player	
2009	Ordinance H5n1	Hector Rivenga	Short
2009	She's Got It	Jordan JD Davis	
2009	Brookes' New America	Webber	Short
2009	Deceptive	Mark Mitchell	
2010	Placebo	Alvin	
2011	The Tombs	Inmate Rayan	Short
2012	The Last Fall	The Turk	
2012	Back Then	Junior	
2014	Seasons of Love	Delivery Man	TV movie
2015	Driving While Black	Debricshaw	
2015	The Man in 3B	Trevor	
2016	Barbershop: The Next Cut	Customer #3	
2017	All Eyez on Me	Treach	
2018	Pimp	Jamal	
2021	Dark City of Villains	Luke	
2022	Layers	Paul	Short
2023	First Comes Love, Then Comes Murder	Doug	TV movie
2023	Gabriel	Gabriel	Short
2023	Whatever It Takes	Juju	TV movie
2024	Goon Squad	Zeek	
2024	The Stepdaughter	Terrance Clark	
2024	Premeditated	Tatum	

=== Television ===
Year	Title	Role	Notes
2007	All My Children	Repo Man #2	Episode: "Episode #1.9698"
2009	Tyler Perry's House of Payne	Roy	Episode: "Payneful News"
2013	Ironside	Senior Cop	Episode: "Brothers in Arms"
2014	Dates from Hell	Trevor	Episode: "Piece of My Heart"
2014	Blue Bloods	Officer Reggie Taylor	Episode: "Power of the Press"
2017	Underground	Elliot	Recurring Cast: Season 2
2018	FBI	Sgt. Winslow	Episode: "Crossfire"
2020	Power	Detective Claremont	Episode: "Reversal of Fortune"
2021	Magnum P.I.	Neil	Episode: "The Day Danger Walked In"
2021	A Luv Tale: The Series	Ken	Recurring Cast
2021-23	BMF	K-9	Guest: Season 1, Recurring Cast: Season 2
2024	Fight Night: The Million Dollar Heist	Melvin	Episode: "Round Five: Ambition Ain't Free"
2025	The Family Business: New Orleans	Pierre Leblanc	Episode: "Surprise, Surprise"
