= Lindsey Pearlman =

American actress (1978–2022)

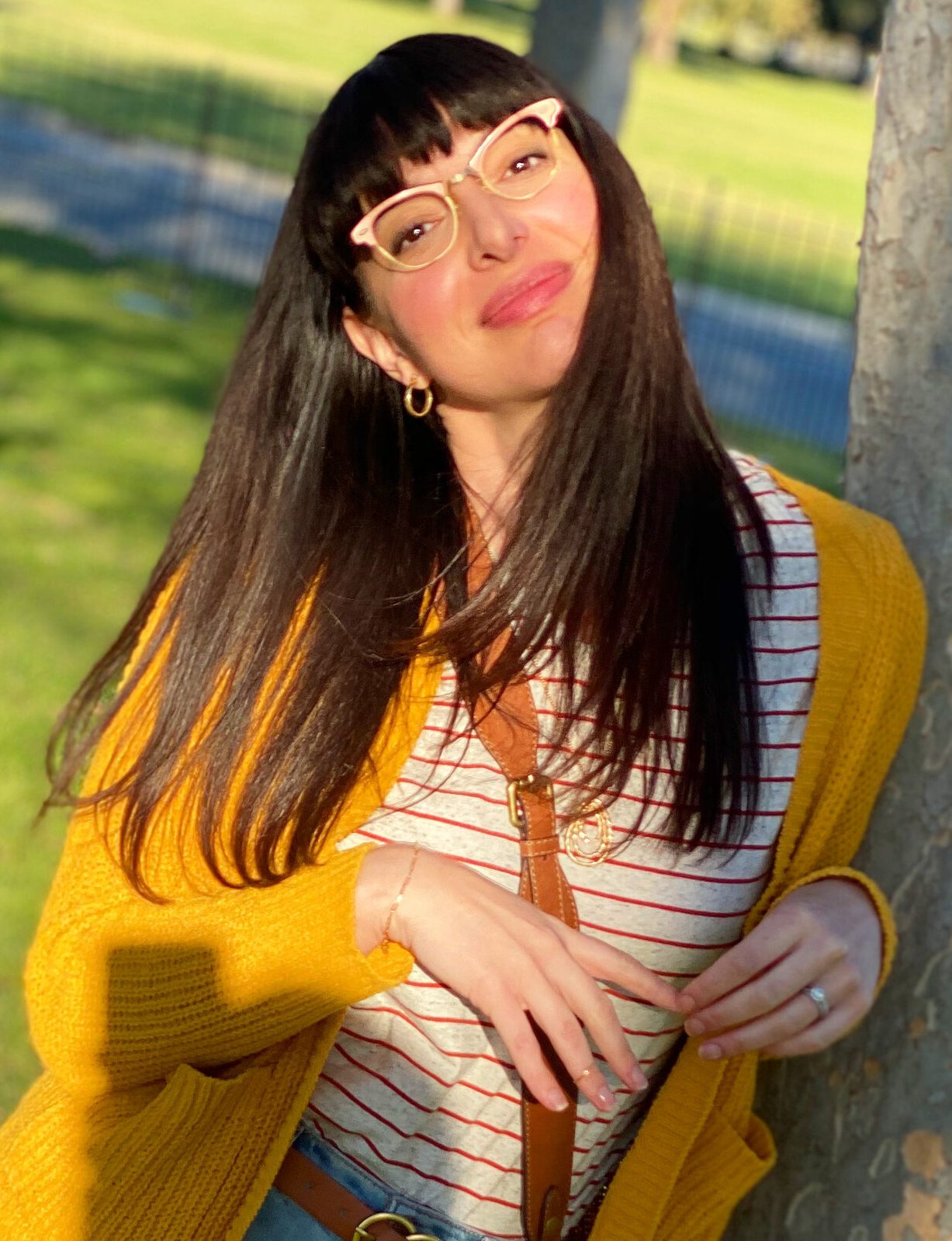
- Pearlman in 2020
- Born: Lindsey Erin Pearlman; October 5, 1978; Chicago, Illinois, U.S.
- Died: February 18, 2022 (aged 43); Runyon Canyon Park, Hollywood, Los Angeles, U.S.
- Spouse: Vance Smith (m. 2013)
- Parents: Stephen Pearlman (father); Sheila Pearlman (mother)
- Relatives: Marni Pearlman (sister)

Lindsey Erin Pearlman (October 5, 1978 – February 18, 2022) was an American actress, known for her roles on General Hospital, Chicago Justice and The Ms. Pat Show. She was also active in television commercials.

== Personal life ==
Pearlman was born on October 5, 1978, in Chicago, Illinois, and started her acting career at a young age. She attended Glenbrook North High School and was active in the theater program. She graduated in 1996. She was married to Vance Smith, a film producer and director.

She was a staunch animal rights activist. Through her work as an organizer for Circus Protest Chicago, she helped to abolish the use of wild animals in Ringling Brothers Circus. Pearlman devoted a great deal of time and effort to rescuing, fostering, and finding permanent homes for animals. In her final years, she frequently worked as a trap-neuter-return volunteer with the Sante D'Or Foundation.

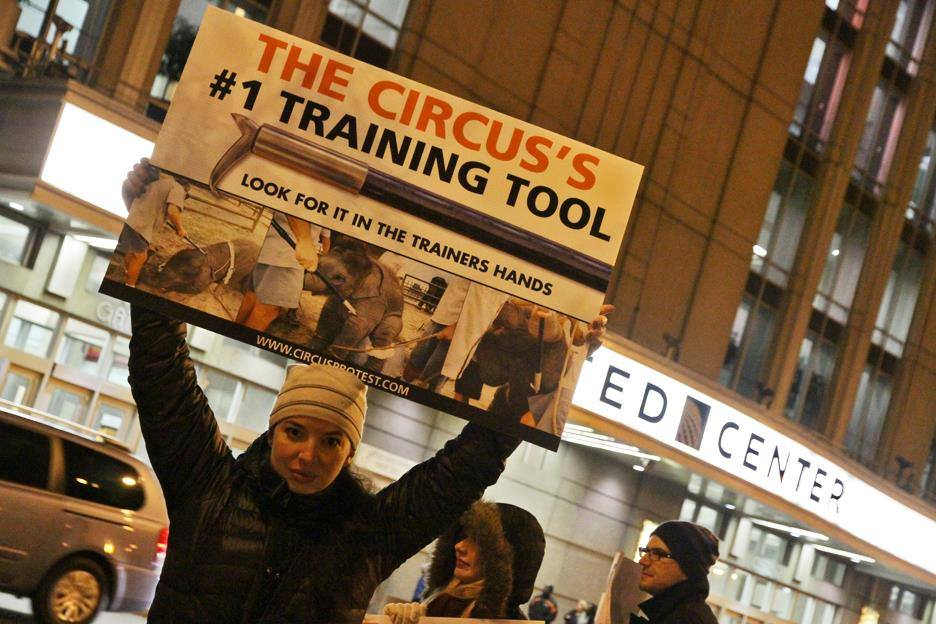
Pearlman leads a protest of the Ringling Bros. and Barnum & Bailey Circus in Chicago in 2013

== Career ==
Pearlman trained at The Second City Conservatory. Before moving to Los Angeles in 2017, she was an active member of the Chicago theatre community. In 2013, she won the Non Equity Joseph Jefferson Award for Actress in a Principal Role for her work in the play Never the Bridesmaid. She also toured to colleges and military bases around the world as a performer in Catharsis Productions' Sex Signals, an interactive improvisational comedy show geared towards sexual assault prevention.

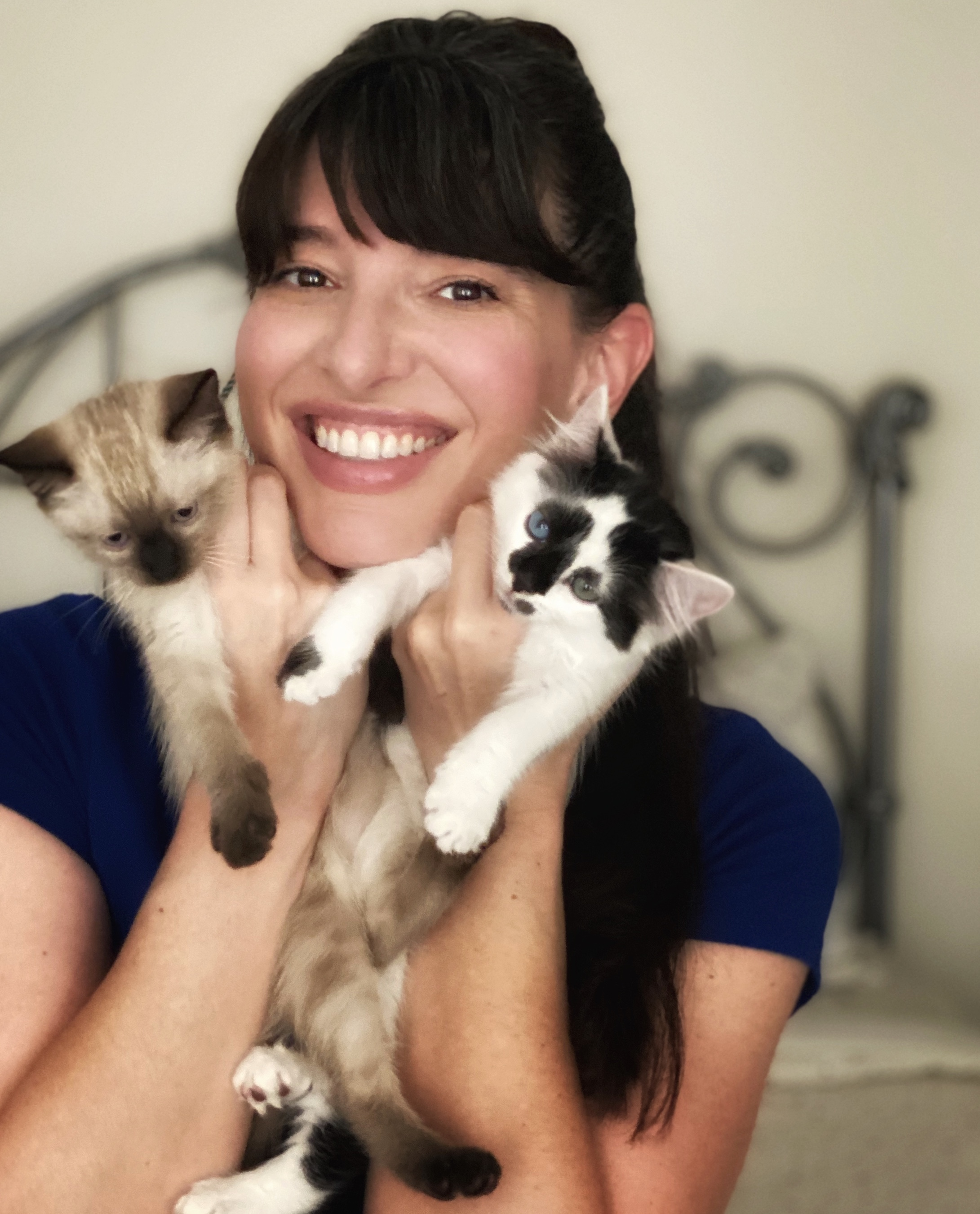
Lindsey with two foster kittens in 2020

On television, she recurred in Chicago Justice, in the role of Joy Fletcher, for five episodes. She also had guest roles in Sneaky Pete, American Housewife, The Purge, General Hospital, and countless television commercials. In 2021, she recurred as Martha on The Ms. Pat Show, and as Karen in Haus of Vicious. She also played Diane Warren on Selena: The Series on Netflix (2021).

== Death ==
On February 15, 2022, Pearlman was reported missing to LAPD. Police found her body in a vehicle on February 18, after responding to a radio call for a death investigation at Franklin Avenue and North Sierra Bonita Avenue. The cause of death, confirmed by the Los Angeles County medical examiner, was determined to be suicide by intentional overdose of a toxic substance.

== Filmography ==
Year	Title	Role	Notes
2015	Empire	Patti Sharp	Episode: "Unto the Breach"
2017	Chicago Justice	Joy Fletcher	5 episodes
2019	Sneaky Pete	Female hotel clerk	Episode: "The Sunshine Switcheroo"
2019	American Housewife	Eve	Episode: "Bed, Bath & Beyond Our Means"
2019	The Purge	Linda	Episode: "Should I Stay or Should I Go"
2020	General Hospital	Margaret McMorris	2 episodes
2021	Selena: The Series	Diane Warren	Episode: "Si una vez"
2021	The Ms. Pat Show	Martha	4 episodes
2022	The Tam and Kevin Show	Mrs. Giving	Episode: "Dumping Demons"
2022	Haus of Vicious	Karen	6 episodes

== See also ==
- List of solved missing person cases (2020s)
