= Brely Evans =

American actress, singer, comic

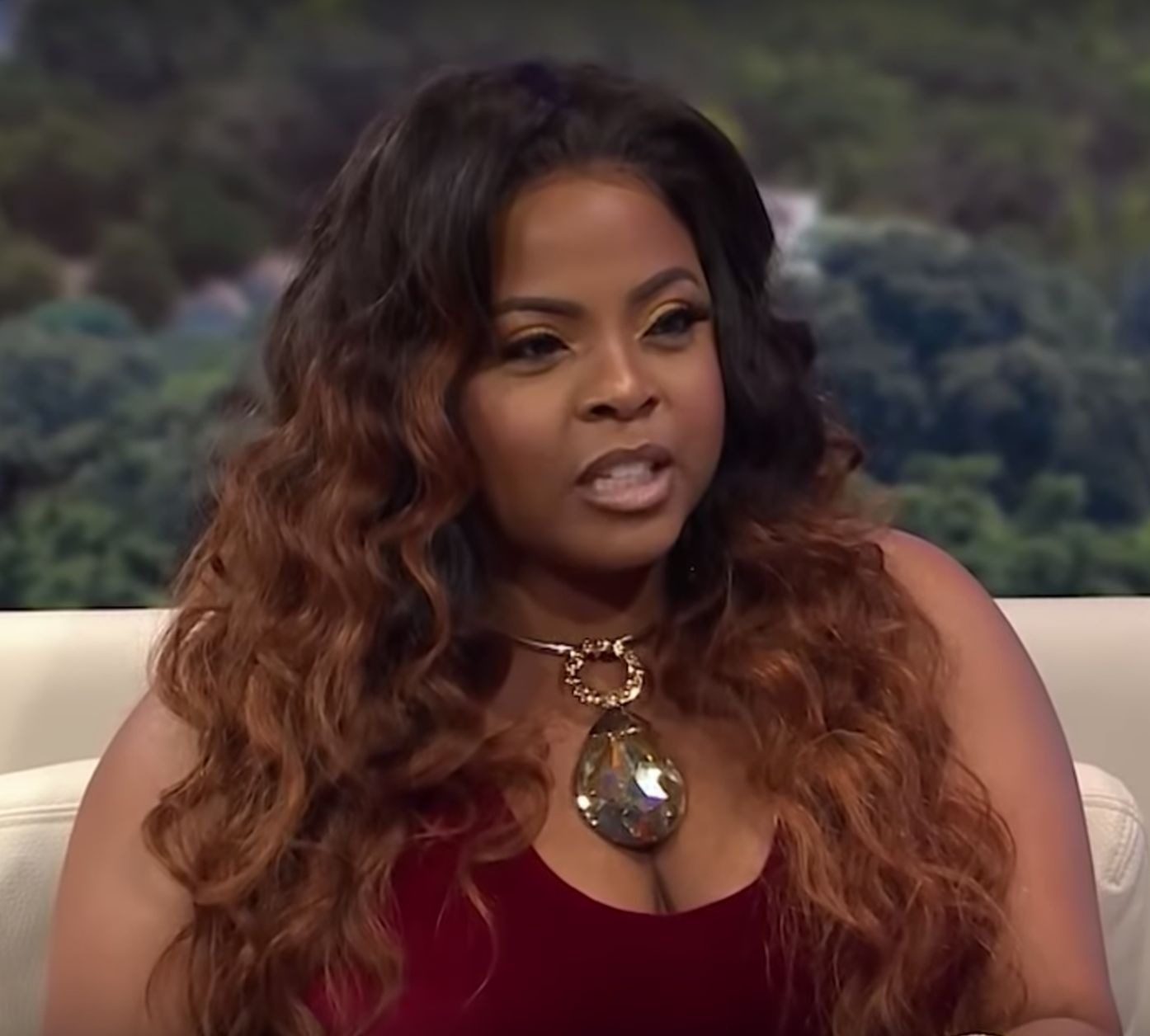
- Evans in 2019
- Born: Oakland, California, U.S
- Occupations: Actress; singer; songwriter; comedian; author; producer
- Years active: 1990–present
- Website: www.brelyevans.com

Brely Evans is an American actress, singer, songwriter, producer, author and comedian. She was a member of the 1990s R&B group Emage. She moved into acting and appeared in films such as Sparkle (2012) and The Man in 3B (2015) and the 2019 Oprah Winfrey Network primetime soap opera, Ambitions. She starred in BET drama series The Family Business (2020–2022) and Haus of Vicious (2022–present).

== Life and career ==
Evans was born and raised in Oakland, California. She was a member in the early 1990s R&B group Emage. Their only album, Soul Deep, was mostly produced by D'Wayne Wiggins from Tony Toni Toné and was released in 1994 by Mercury Records. Their only notable single/Video, "The Choice Is Yours," reached #48 on the Hot R&B/Hip-Hop Songs chart. Evans later received a bachelor’s degree in marketing in Los Angeles and landed a job in Larrabee Sound Studios. She also became a session singer, sang backup on several Warren G songs, and worked on Dr. Dre’s debut studio album, The Chronic. By the end of the 2000s, Evans worked as a real estate agent and sold her first home to Queen Latifah. Evans later had a minor role in the 2010 romantic comedy Just Wright starring Latifah.

In 2010s, Evans began acting in films such as He's Mine Not Yours (2011), Note to Self (2012), and the 2012 remake of Sparkle. She co-starred in the Regina King-directed drama Let the Church Say Amen, and appeared in David E. Talbert's Suddenly Single (2013), Black Coffee (2014), The Man in 3B (2015), and played the leading role in You Can't Fight Christmas (2017). On television, Evans had a recurring roles on BET drama series Being Mary Jane from 2014 to 2015, and TV One comedy series Born Again Virgin in 2015.

In 2019, Evans was cast in two series regular roles. First, a female lead on the Bounce TV comedy series Last Call opposite Charles Malik Whitfield. Later that year, she began starring in the Oprah Winfrey Network prime time soap opera, Ambitions, playing Rondell Lancaster, the sister of Atlanta Mayor Evan Lancaster (Brian J. White). The series was canceled after one season. In 2020 she co-starred in the made-for-television movie Steppin' Back to Love, starred in the first season of Urban Movie Channel horror anthology series Terror Lake Drive, and the Urban Movie Channel comedy-drama series For the Love of Jason.

In 2020, Evans was cast as Sonya Duncan in the first season of the BET crime drama series The Family Business. She was promoted to series regular for the fourth season. In 2022 she co-starred opposite Meagan Tandy in the thriller film Stalked Within and played the lead in the romantic drama film Single Not Searching. Later in 2022 she starred opposite Tami Roman in the BET drama series Haus of Vicious. The following year, Evans starred opposite Denise Boutte in the TV One and Lifetime drama film A Mother's Intuition, and the comedy-drama Whatever It Takes alongside Tami Roman, A.J. Johnson and Kandi Burruss. In 2023, Evans starred as GeGe in the We TV drama series Kold x Windy.

== Filmography ==
=== Film ===
Year	Title	Role	Notes
2008	Outrighteous	Singing Elizabeth	
2010	Just Wright	Sabrina	
2010	Love Chronicles: Secrets Revealed	Nurse	
2011	Tracks	-	Short film
2011	He's Mine Not Yours	Waitress	
2012	The Marriage Lottery	Team Roman	
2012	Note to Self	Tiffany Grace	
2012	C'mon Man	Interviewee	
2012	Sparkle	Tune Ann	
2012	David E. Talbert's Suddenly Single	Kat	
2012	Douglass U	Kayla	
2014	Black Coffee	Nicole	
2014	More to Love	Chelle	
2014	For Love or Money	Lil Mama	
2014	Just a Dream	Rachel	Short film
2015	72 Hours	Marquita	
2015	B Love	Victoria	Short film
2015	The Man in 3B	Connie	
2015	My First Love	Jasmine	
2016	Addicted to You	Amber Taylor	
2017	Walk Away from Love	Lana	
2017	Miss Me This Christmas	Leslie Major	
2017	You Can't Fight Christmas	Leslie Major	
2019	Black Privilege	Angie	
2021	Triggers	Camila	Short film, also associate producer
2022	Boosters LA	Yvonne	
2022	Stalked Within	Trina	
2022	Single Not Searching	Brianna	Also associate producer
2022	Turnt	Kim	
2023	Channel You	Marianne	
2023	A Mother's Intuition	Cicely	
2023	Black Girl Erupted	Jillian	
2023	Wide Open: The Andre Rison Story	Psychologist	
2023	Whatever It Takes	India	
2024	Black Girl Magic	Marie	Also producer
2024	Momma's Boy - A Son Returns	Faith Tenner	Also producer

=== Television ===
Year	Title	Role	Notes
2011	Lbs		Episode: "Tummy Loves Trouble"
2011	The Cookout 2	Ghetto Cheerleader	Television film
2013	Let the Church Say Amen	Shante	Television film
2014–2015	Being Mary Jane	Nichelle	Recurring role (seasons 1–3), 6 episodes
2015	Born Again Virgin	Kelly	Recurring role (season 1), 3 episodes
2017	Mann & Wife	Cabella	Episode: "Take Me to the Mann"
2019	Last Call	Joy Beane	Main role, 13 episodes
2019	Ambitions	Rondell Pauline Lancaster	Main role, 18 episodes
2020	Steppin' Back to Love	Paula	Television film
2020	Terror Lake Drive	Jojo	Recurring role (season 1)
2020–2022	The Family Business	Sonya	Recurring role (season 2); guest star (season 3), Regular (season 4), 14 episodes
2020–2022	For the Love of Jason	Alexandria Grant	Main role, 7 episodes
2022	The Neighborhood	Janice	Episode: "Welcome to the Dream Girls"
2022–present	Haus of Vicious	Avery	Main role
2023–present	Kold x Windy	GeGe	Main role
2024	Churchy		Executive producer

=== Music Videos ===
Year	Title	Artist	Notes
2014	Beautiful	Mali Music	Herself
2015	Shame	Tyrese	Mary
2018	Just My Type	Tiana	Herself
