= Williamsburg (film) =

- Directed by: Brad Saville
- Written by: Brad Saville
- Screenplay by: Brad Saville
- Produced by: Brad Saville; Jeff Roll
- Cinematography: Will Sargent
- Edited by: Brad Saville
- Production company: Cadillac Films
- Release dates: March 9, 2006 (New York Film and Video Festival)
- Running time: 88 minutes
- Country: United States
- Language: English

Williamsburg is a 2006 American independent film written, directed, and edited by Brad Saville, as a black and white feature length narrative comedy/drama that provides a satirical look at the lives of seven failing artists in Williamsburg, Brooklyn.

== Background ==
Williamsburg follows the style set by the French film La Ronde, individually following one character before changing focus when that one interacts with another as the new focus. It was shot on a low budget over a 10-day period, and filmmaker Brad Saville taught himself film editing to complete the project.

== Premise ==
The film follows the lives of artists and artistic poseurs who inhabit a Williamsburg "hipster" neighborhood, as each tries to be true to their own creative inspirations even if such dedication results in self-destruction.

== Cast ==
- Russ Russo as Brother James
- David Marcus as Will
- Olja Hrustic as Adella
- Penny Bittone as Truman
- Evertz Israel Saenz-Perez as Miguel
- Jeff Roll as Monty
- Anna Lamadrid as Anna
- Afi Ekulona as Rafael
- Tehila Kronfeld as Truman's Amy
- Rayan Lawrence as G-Train

== Critical reception ==
Film Threat wrote that aspiring filmmakers should seek out this film in order to "gain inspiration from what cinematographer Will Sargent and director Brad Saville achieved from behind the camera." They felt that in black and white, the film offered "a series of bold, artistic compositions that uses monochromatic hues to create an extraordinary play of light and shadows" and a "striking visual style". They praised the use of camerawork that "brilliantly" mirrored the interplay of its characters. However, it was found that the filmmakers tended to dwell on certain scenes or camera angles too intently to be completely successful. This method required that the cast keep dialog flowing longer than might be expected, but they were themselves praised for bringing their characters life and providing "a memorable tapestry of lives on the artistic fringes." The efforts of actors Russ Russo, Penny Bittone, and Evertz I. Saenz-Perez were singled out as particularly good. The review concluded with the summary "All told, “Williamsburg” is an impressive and memorable achievement."

== Release ==
The film premiered at the New York International Independent Film and Video Festival on May 9, 2006, followed by screenings at the Queens International Film Festival in November of that year, and at Delray Beach Film Festival, the Syracuse International Film Festival, and the Long Island Wine Country Film Festival in 2007.
