= Pimp (2018 film) =

- Directed by: Christine Crokos
- Written by: Christine Crokos
- Produced by: Victoria Bousis; Christine Crokos; Alexis Varouxakis
- Starring: Keke Palmer; Haley Ramm; Aunjanue Ellis; Vanessa Morgan; Mike E. Winfield; Edi Gathegi; DMX
- Cinematography: Rik Zang
- Edited by: John Scott Cook; Todd Sandler
- Music by: Alec Puro
- Production companies: Adrenaline Entertainment; 1821 Pictures
- Distributed by: Vertical Entertainment
- Release date: November 9, 2018
- Running time: 86 minutes
- Country: United States
- Language: English

Pimp is a 2018 American drama film written and directed by Christine Crokos and starring Keke Palmer. Lee Daniels served as an executive producer.

== Plot ==
Wednesday, a female pimp, grows up learning the game from her father Midnight, her mother Mae being one of his girls, making her quit and settling down with her until he dies in his sleep from an overdose. Once he's gone, she's left looking after her mother, who has become an addict, and her girlfriend Nikki.

In need of more money to survive, Nikki decides to turn tricks, insisting it's just business and surprisingly changing their luck. Rising up in the game, Wednesday continues to hustle hard for a dream of a better life for her girls and a ticket out of the Bronx with Nikki, all while looking after a strung out Mae. But when Wednesday pulls a stripper named Destiny (Vanessa Morgan), she believes this is the jackpot to being free.

Destiny begins bringing in big money and trouble, Wednesday spoils her, and disregards the needs of Nikki, who's becoming sick of the lifestyle. When Wednesday’s life seems to be turning around, Mae becomes incarcerated. Visiting her, Wednesday finds out that Mae never loved her and only wanted to be back home. Enraged, Wednesday leaves her there, making that her home. She then comes face to face with Kenny, Destiny’s pimp/ex that she ran away from, who runs a more dangerous game. He confronts Wednesday and takes back Destiny, leaving Wednesday to fight one of Kenny's henchmen who ends up dead.

In a ferocious battle for survival of the fittest, Wednesday fights for freedom and risks everything to protect what's hers including Nikki. She finds out that money is the real thing that should never be brought too close to the heart.

== Cast ==
- Keke Palmer as Wednesday
- Vanessa Morgan as Destiny
- Edi Gathegi as Kenny Wayne
- Haley Ramm as Nikki
- Aunjanue Ellis as Gloria May
- Lyrica Okano as Kim
- DMX as Midnight John
- Paola Lázaro as Louisa
- Mike E. Winfield as Science
- Rayan Lawrence as Jamal
- Paige Searcy as Charlie

== Reception ==
On the review aggregator Rotten Tomatoes, the film holds an approval rating of 56% based on nine reviews, with an average rating of 6.4/10. On Metacritic, the film has a weighted average score of 44 out of 100, based on four critics, indicating "mixed or average reviews".
