= Girl in the Closet =

Television film directed by Jaira Thomas

- Written by: Sa'Rah Jones; Courtney Miller
- Directed by: Jaira Thomas
- Starring: Tami Roman; Remy Ma; Daijah Peters; Danielle LaRoach; Stevie Baggs; Teisha Speight; Willie Raysor
- Music by: Ozzy Doniz
- Country of origin: United States
- Original language: English

Production
- Executive producers: Rob Hill; Abbey Sibucao
- Cinematography: Jalani Riley
- Editor: Ivan Ortega
- Running time: 87 minutes
- Production company: Swirl Films

Original release
- Network: Lifetime
- Release: March 11, 2023

Girl in the Closet is a 2023 American true crime drama television film directed by Jaira Thomas and written by Sa'Rah Jones and Courtney Miller. The film based on the true story of Beatrice Weston who was locked in a basement for ten years after her mother suffered a brain aneurysm in 2001 and endured physical and sexual abuse by her aunt Linda Weston and her aunts boyfriend. Although the story is wrongly portrayed as that of Lauren Kavanaugh; the real story is based out of Philadelphia, most famously known as “The Tacony Dungeon" case or “Philadelphia basement kidnapping” case. Victims such as Tamara Breeden were beaten with various objects, including bats and pistol butts. They were starved, drugged, and forced into prostitution and to live in dark, isolated, and filthy conditions. Weston also targeted mentally disabled and vulnerable people, luring them with promises of a new home. Weston stole their disability checks, and moved them to different locations across several states to evade authorities. Some victims were held for years. In 2015, Linda Weston was sentenced to life in prison plus 80 years. Her accomplices were also convicted and sentenced. It stars Tami Roman, Remy Ma, Daijah Peters, Danielle LaRoach, Stevie Baggs, Willie Raysor,and Teisha Speight. The film premiered on Lifetime on March 11, 2023.

Girl in the Closet is the part of Girl In film series, following Girl in Room 13, Girl in the Basement, Girl in the Bunker, Girl in the Box and Girl in the Shed: The Kidnapping of Abby Hernandez.

== Plot ==
During a birthday party attended by her relatives, Cameron Smith and her mother Patricia are visited by her aunt Mia and her daughter Angela. Patricia is wary of Mia because the latter was arrested after she had killed someone in self-defense and placed his body in a closet.

One day, Patricia suffers from an aneurysm, and Cameron ends up placed in Mia's custody. Mia takes her to her home where she lives with Angela and her husband Chris. Things take a dark turn when Mia has Cameron placed in the basement with several other captives: Nancy, Joanne, and Harland. After Chris gives them drugged Kool-Aid, Mia sells Cameron, Nancy, and Joanne out for sex. After recovering from her aneurysm, Patricia tries to get Cameron back with help from social workers. They end up finding out about Aunt Mia's criminal record, but when they track down Mia's house, a neighbor tells them that they have left town.

In Nashville, Tennessee some years later, Mia, Chris, and Angela have settled down with Cameron, Nancy, Joanne, and Harland placed in the basement. As a result of Nancy and Joanne giving birth from the sex work they are put in, Aunt Mia sells their babies on the black market to make ends meet. While at a bar, Mia entices a medical school graduate named Diana into coming to her house, and imprisons her in the basement to help with the deliveries. Joanne goes into labor, but the baby ends up stillborn. Diana tries to escape, only to slip and fatally hit her head on the steps. As Chris is instructed to bury her body, Mia keeps Cameron in line by promising to frame her for Diana's death unless she remains obedient.

While shopping for groceries, Mia meets a homeless man named Pastor who claims that he is a war veteran. Though Mia is not fooled, she does give him a job as a pimp. Pastor takes Cameron, Nancy, and Joanne to their assigned clients every night. Nancy's client is a police officer, who is told about Mia but decides to do nothing. After Joanne gives birth, Mia confiscates the baby. While Angela goes back to Atlanta after an argument with her mother, Cameron persuades Chris into letting her care for the baby while Mia naps. Behind his back, Cameron takes the baby down to see Joanne.

One day, the police officer client brings Nancy to Mia, claiming that she tried to escape, causing Mia to have Nancy locked in the attic. Cameron regularly visits her to bring her crackers and water after secretly drugging Pastor, but Nancy advises Cameron not to visit her again. One day later, Cameron finds Nancy dead from heatstroke. When Mia, Chris, and Pastor find Nancy dead, Pastor states that he did not sign up for this. Mia reminds him of their agreement and takes everyone back to Atlanta.

At Angela's latest house, the basement proves too small for all the captives, so Angela locks Cameron in the closet with Mia claiming that she is doing this to make her family strong. Chris states to Mia that he can't find another house with a big enough basement and gives some water and crackers to a locked up Cameron.

Sometime later, Angela's landlord has become nosy following some smell complaints from the neighbors. After a visit at the house, he hears a sound from the basement, breaks open the door and finds Harlan and Joanne, whereupon he calls the police. Later that night, Mia, Chris, Angela, and Pastor are arrested. Cameron is freed and is finally reunited with her mother.

Five years later, a remorseful Mia is up for parole with Cameron and Patricia in attendance. When a parole board member asks if anyone would like to say anything before they pass their verdict, Cameron takes the chance to tell Mia that what she said to her before locking in the closet is not making her family stronger and calls her evil. As Mia is led back into prison, a postscript states that the perpetrators that inspired this film received lengthy prison sentences and the city reached a settlement with those that they had failed to help.

== Cast ==
- Tami Roman as Aunt Mia
- Remy Ma as Patricia Smith
- Daijah Peters as Teen Cameron Smith
  - Brielle Oliver as Young Cameron
- Danielle LaRoach as Nancy
- Stevie Baggs as Chris
- Teisha Speight as Joanne
- Jazz Anderson as Angela
- Willie Raysor as Pastor
- Jason Jamal Ligon as Harland
- Matthew Rimmer as John #3/Police Officer
- Bradley Hasemeyer as Josh Goodman
- Jael Roberson as Renee
- LaKeta Booker as Gail
- Jen L. Burry as Diana
- LaTangela Newsome as Yolanda
- Courtney Miller as Dennis
- Kent Fields as Brian

== Reception ==
Film critic Liz Kocan of Decider gave the film a negative review, but praised Tami Roman's performance as sadistic Aunt.
