= The Real World Homecoming: Los Angeles =

Spin-off miniseries of The Real World

- Season 2
- Starring: Tami Roman; Jon Brennan; Beth Stolarczyk; Irene Berrera-Kearns; David Edwards; Glen Naessens; Beth Anthony
- No. of episodes: 8

Release
- Original network: Paramount+
- Original release: November 24, 2021 – January 12, 2022

Season chronology
- ← Previous; The Real World Homecoming: New York Next → The Real World Homecoming: New Orleans

The Real World Homecoming: Los Angeles is the second season of the spin-off miniseries of The Real World, that reunited seven of the nine cast members of the second season of the show to live in the same Venice beach house they lived in for the original series. Dominic Griffin and Aaron Behle did not participate in the reunion. David Edwards left the house in Episode 7 after Tami Akbar called her husband to come by the house and confront him; Edwards returned in the season finale Episode 8 after the security staff intervened, but only stayed long enough to gather his things and wish the rest of the cast not-well before leaving them for good.

The Real World Homecoming was renewed for two more seasons on September 29, 2021. It was also announced that the second season would be reuniting the cast of The Real World: Los Angeles and would premiere on Paramount+ on November 24, 2021.

== Episodes ==
No. overall	No. in season	Title	Original release date
7	1	"It's Still Not Funny"	November 24, 2021
8	2	"Raw Footage"	December 1, 2021
9	3	"We Gonna Be Real or We Not"	December 8, 2021
10	4	"Something Borrowed, Something Blew"	December 15, 2021
11	5	"Moving Forward with a New Story"	December 22, 2021
12	6	"Aint Done Singin' Yet"	December 29, 2021
13	7	"Fight or Flight, PT. 1"	January 5, 2022
14	8	"Fight or Flight, PT. 2"	January 12, 2022
