= Ambitions (TV series) =

American TV series (2019)

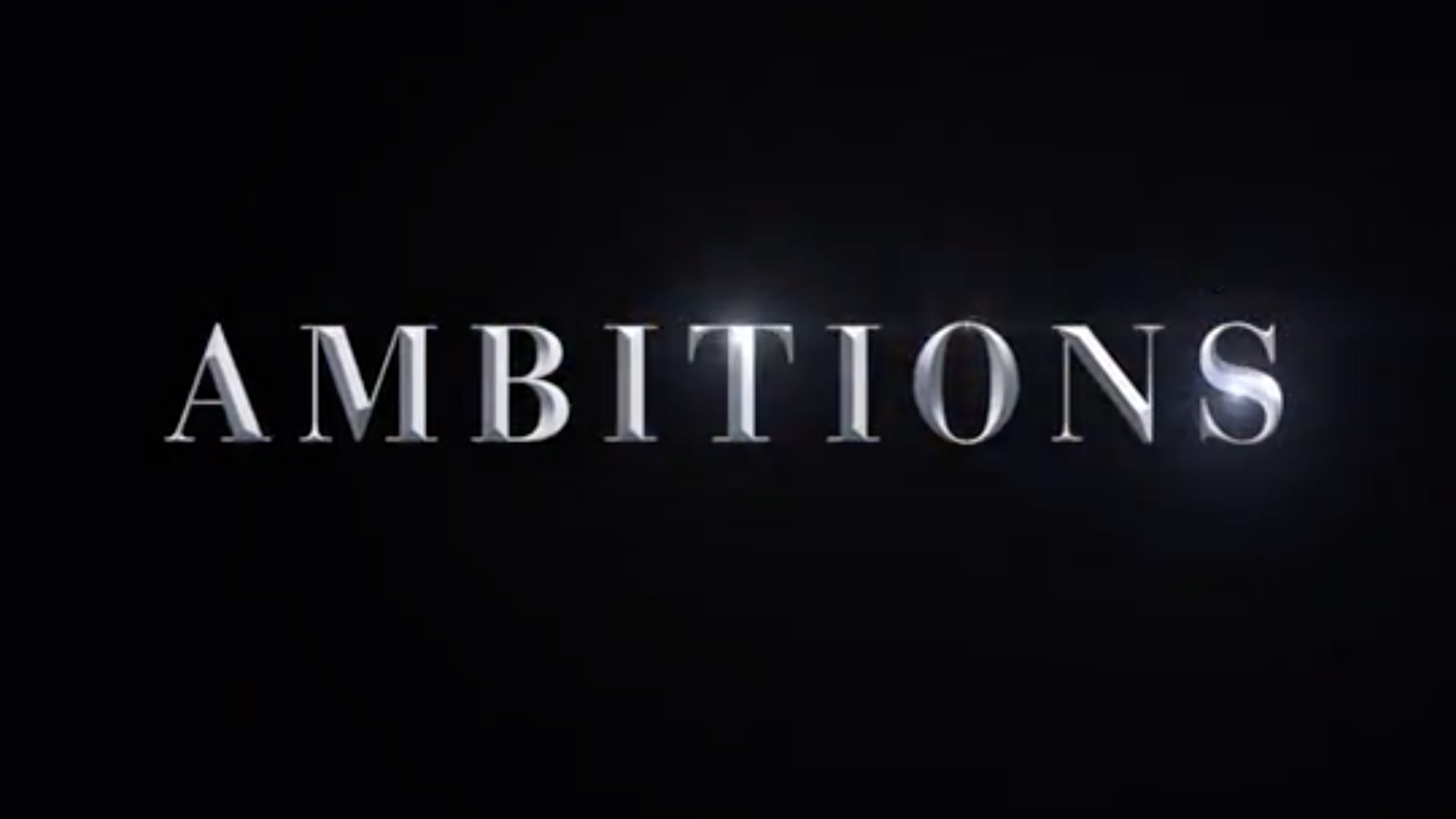
- Genre: Soap opera; Family drama
- Created by: Jamey Giddens; Will Packer
- Written by: Jamey Giddens
- Starring: Robin Givens; Brian J. White; Kendrick Cross; Brely Evans; Erica Page; Essence Atkins
- Composer: Akira Kosemura
- Country of origin: United States
- Original language: English
- No. of seasons: 1
- No. of episodes: 18

Production
- Executive producers: Will Packer; Kevin Arkadie; Jamey Giddens; Sheila Ducksworth
- Running time: 42 minutes
- Production companies: Will Packer Media; Harpo Films; Debmar-Mercury

Original release
- Network: OWN
- Release: June 18 – December 17, 2019

Ambitions is an American drama television series created by Jamey Giddens and Will Packer, and executive produced by Will Packer Productions and Lionsgate Television. The series stars Robin Givens as the glamorous and powerful Stephanie Carlisle, the wife of Atlanta Mayor Evan Lancaster (Brian J. White) and Essence Atkins as Amara Hughes, a lawyer in the U.S. Attorney's Office, who recently relocated to Atlanta. The series premiered on June 18, 2019 on OWN. The second half of the first season debuted on OWN, November 12, 2019. In January 2020, OWN canceled the series after one season.

== Cast and characters ==
=== Main ===
- Robin Givens as Stephanie Carlisle Lancaster, an ambitious attorney and the wife of Atlanta Mayor Evan Lancaster
- Essence Atkins as Amara Hughes, Assistant United States Attorney and former friend-turned-adversary of Stephanie Lancaster
- Brian J. White as Evan Lancaster, Jr., Stephanie's husband and the ambitious Mayor of Atlanta, Georgia
- Kendrick Cross as Titus Hughes, Amara's husband
- Brely Evans as Rondell Pauline Lancaster, Evan Lancaster's older sister and owner of Thelma's Place
- Erica Page as Bella Tru, a fashion designer. She is one of Evan's lovers and mother of his illegitimate son.

=== Recurring ===
- Christina Kirkman as Lori Purifoy, smart and challenging daughter of Hunter Purifoy who works in PR
- Steven Williams as Stephen Carlisle, a powerful attorney and father of Stephanie
- Brian Bosworth as Hunter Purifoy, a savvy pharmaceutical magnate, who is in the throes of combating a class action lawsuit brought by the powerful Carlisle law firm family
- Deena Dill as Juniper Purifoy, Hunter's wife
- Gino Anthony Pesi as Greg Peters, an aggressive, self-confident real estate developer who's trying to make Rondell sell him the family restaurant so he could use the block in an upcoming development plan
- Alexander Mulzac as Damian Collins, A former lover of Amara and United states attorney
- Kayla Smith as Carly Lancaster, Stephanie and Evan's smart and determined daughter, who's a theater major at Spelman College
- Donna Biscoe as Irene Perkins-Carlisle, Stephanie's mother
- Tony Vaughn as Evan "Senior" Lancaster, Sr., Evan and Rondell's father who founded Thelma's Place
- Lana Young as Inez Trujillo, Bella's mother who works at Thelma's Place
- Brianne Cordaro as Daphne Manning, a member of Evan Lancaster's city administration and his mistress
- Andrew Rush as Alix, Evan Lancaster's personal security detail
- Felisha Terrell as Marylin Barnes, Stephanie and Amara's sorority sister, a philanthropist
- E. Roger Mitchell as Marvin Barnes, Marilyn's husband and owner of Beta New Electric
- Maria Legarda as Perla, Bella's jealous friend
- Ashton Leigh as Natasha, Greg Peters cousin

== Episodes ==
No.	Title	Directed by	Written by	Original release date	U.S. viewers (millions)
1	"Friends & Lovers"	Benny Boom	Jamey Giddens	June 18, 2019	1.18
Titus and Amara contend with issues from their past; Stephanie takes her relationship with Evan to the point of no return; The Carlisles and Purifoys take their generational feud to another level; Rondell and Evan seek to tamp down a common threat.
2	"Woman to Woman"	Larry Shaw	Kevin Arkadie	June 25, 2019	1.14
Amara puts Stephanie on notice. Atlanta's first lady learns a shocking secret about a rival. Bella makes a bold play to get what she wants. Rondell finds an ally in her fight to save her restaurant.
3	"Welcome to Birmingham"	Larry Shaw	Susan Dansby	July 2, 2019	1.09
Stephanie looks for a way to repay Amara. Rondell falls out of favor with Senior. Bella looks to exploit her connection to the mayor.
4	"Reap What You Sew"	Benny Boom	Michele Val Jean	July 9, 2019	0.75
Stephanie and Evan join forces to pursue mutual self-interests. Titus undertakes a risky mission that could destroy his career.
5	"Killing Me Softly"	Benny Boom	Trey Anthony	July 16, 2019	0.59
Titus and Amara are surprised by a blast from their past who blows into town; Stephanie comes up with a diabolical plan to retain the firm's most prized client; Rondell's relationship takes a turn; Bella figures out a way to resume her livelihood; Carly gives Lori an ultimatum.
6	"What About Your Friends"	Angela Gomes	Jamey Giddens	July 23, 2019	0.71
Stephanie is a force to be reckoned with at a Women's Empowerment Summit; Bella forges an alliance with Rod; Evan attempts to bargain with Greg Peters; Carly is taken off-guard by Stephanie's perfect timing.
7	"Poison and Wine"	Angela Gomes	Jazmen Darnell Brown	July 30, 2019	0.68
Stephanie makes an accusation and vows to get revenge; Bella navigates Rod and Evan; Amara forms an unlikely partnership that compels Titus to make questionable moves; Senior suffers a health setback; Carly takes a leap of faith with Lori.
8	"Backstabbers"	Neema Barnette	Susan Dansby	August 6, 2019	0.71
Stephanie and Irene conspire against Rondell; Titus takes matters into his own hands; Rondell makes personal and professional moves; Greg's family means business.
9	"Giving Up"	Neema Barnette	Michele Val Jean	August 13, 2019	0.66
Rondell loses in a big way; Stephanie exacts revenge on Lori; The highly anticipated Anniversary Celebration at Thelma's Place ends sooner than expected; Damian continues to wreak havoc in the lives of Titus and Amara.
10	"Ex-Factor"	Benny Boom	Gabrielle Fulton Ponder	August 20, 2019	0.74
The Barnes have a big surprise for the Carlisles, forcing Stephanie and Evan to fight fire with fire; Amara receives backlash at work for her prior indiscretions; Bella makes a bold move with Stephanie; Titus' win for Rondell is eclipsed by the loss he suffers from Damian; Greg tells Stephanie she's run out of time.
11	"A Change is Gonna Come"	Benny Boom	Kevin Arkadie	August 27, 2019	0.79
Stephanie has the ultimate trump card against Amara. Bella is giving love another chance, only to be hurt again. Rondell and Evan are blind-sided.
12	"The Thrill Is Gone"	Kenny Leon	Jazmen Darnell Brown	November 12, 2019	0.59
Evan and Rondell demand justice from Greg; Bella's best friend Perla dispenses advice; Amara's suspicions are confirmed; Evan finds a new rival in Kent; Titus and Amara work to reconcile; Stephanie pushes back against Greg's cousin Natasha.
13	"Since I Lost My Baby"	Kenny Leon	Jacqueline McKinley & Antonia March	November 19, 2019	0.54
Evan and Bell endure the worst day of their lives. A blast from the past haunt Evan and Rondell.
14	"You Owe Me"	Crystle Roberson	Gabrielle Fulton Ponder	November 26, 2019	0.54
Amara sets a trap; Stephanie reveals a painful secret; Hunter teeters on the brink of disaster; Cousin Darcia dispenses life-changing news; Perla feels the heat.
15	"Blood on the Dance Floor"	Crystle Roberson	Jazmen Darnell Brown	December 3, 2019	0.60
Carlisle matriarch Irene shows her mettle; A new foe walks into Amara's life; Stephanie issues an ultimatum; Evan betrays an ally; Titus becomes a target; Damian takes a stand.
16	"Hit 'em Up"	Unknown	Unknown	December 10, 2019	0.48
Rondell and Evan join forces to save Thelma's Place; Stephanie seeks payback; An unlikely suspect comes forth as Senior's killer; Hunter presses Titus to follow his lead; Bella scrutinizes her inner circle; Amara is taken off guard; Stephen and Hunter release their fury; Perla gets revenge.
17	"Through the Wire"	Unknown	Unknown	December 10, 2019	0.54
Stephanie closes in on the corner office; Bella is overwhelmed; Rondell discovers Darcia's dirty secret; Lori grows suspicious of Titus; Stephanie confronts Bella; Damian likes the hand he's dealt himself.
18	"Save the Best for Last"	Unknown	Unknown	December 17, 2019	0.57
Stephanie plays a deadly game with Evan; Titus faces unforeseen circumstances; Stephen has a surprise for Stephanie; Bella loosens Stephanie's grip; Rondell and Evan are pushed to their limits with Darcia; Stephanie and Amara keep their friends close and enemies closer.

== Production ==
=== Development ===
On April 17, 2018, it was announced that Oprah Winfrey Network ordered straight-to-series new scripted drama Ambitions from producer Will Packer and Lionsgate Television. The series was created by Jamey Giddens. Kevin Arkadie later joined as showrunner and Benny Boom directed the pilot episode. On January 23, 2020, the series was canceled after one season.

=== Casting ===
On November 13, 2018, it was announced that Givens will play the leading role, along with Atkins, White, Cross, Evans and Page. On December 4, 2018, Steven Williams and Christina Kirkman have joined the cast. In January 2019, Brian Bosworth, Deena Dill, Gino Anthony Pesi and Kayla Smith were cast in recurring roles for the first season.
