= Haus of Vicious =

American drama television series

- Genre: Drama
- Created by: Jill Ramsey
- Directed by: Kim Fields
- Starring: Tami Roman; Redaric Williams; Erica Peeples; Norman Nixon Jr.; Tiffany Black; Kyler O'Neal; Ella Joyce; Brely Evans; Kayla Eva; Lyric Anderson
- Composers: Warryn Campbell; Henry Roque; Jesse Roque
- Country of origin: United States
- Original language: English
- No. of seasons: 2
- No. of episodes: 16

Production
- Executive producers: Jill Ramsey; Tami Roman; Eric Tomosunas; Kimberly L. Ogletree; Kim Fields; Herb Kimble; Maureen Guthman; Marvin Neil
- Camera setup: Multiple camera
- Running time: 40 minutes
- Production companies: Roman Ramsey Productions; Karat Entertainment; Lux Angeles Studios

Original release
- Network: BET
- Release: August 17 – October 5, 2022
- Network: BET+
- Release: September 19 – October 31, 2024

Haus of Vicious is an American drama television series created by Jill Ramsey that premiered on BET on August 17, 2022.

In March 2024, the series was renewed for a second season, which premiered on BET+ on September 19, 2024.

== Plot ==
The series follows Chantel Vivian (Tami Roman), a fashion designer whose success is overshadowed by her narcissistic husband, addiction, unresolved childhood traumas, and dysfunctional personal life. With the assistance of her secret weapon, Jaelyn Ryan (Erica Peeples), publicist to her Vicious Empire, Chantel works to rise through the ranks, but her husband Kane's (Redaric Williams) behavior threatens to tear down the house.

== Cast and characters ==
=== Main ===
- Tami Roman as Chantel Vivian
- Redaric Williams as Kane
- Erica Peeples as Jaelyn Ryan
- Norman Nixon Jr. as Milan
- Tiffany Black as Raven
- Kyler O'Neal as Izzy
- Ella Joyce as Carolyn
- Brely Evans as Avery
- Kayla Eva as Dayna
- Lyric Anderson as Tia

=== Recurring ===
- Lindsey Pearlman as Karen (season 1)
- Zariyah Gibson as young Chantel (season 1)
- Robert Ri'chard as Nile (season 2)

== Episodes ==
Season	Episodes	Originally released		
Season	Episodes	First released	Last released	Network
1	8	August 17, 2022	October 5, 2022	BET
2	8	September 19, 2024	October 31, 2024	BET+

=== Season 1 (2022) ===
No. overall	No. in season	Title	Directed by	Written by	Original release date	U.S. viewers (millions)
1	1	"Haus of Vicious"	Kim Fields	Tu-Shonda Whitaker & Amaleka McCall	August 17, 2022	0.30
2	2	"A Vicious Scandal"	Kim Fields	Tu-Shonda Whitaker & Amaleka McCall	August 24, 2022	0.35
3	3	"Vicious Lies"	Kim Fields	Tu-Shonda Whitaker & Amaleka McCall	August 31, 2022	0.32
4	4	"Vicious Betrayal"	Kim Fields	Tu-Shonda Whitaker & Amaleka McCall	September 7, 2022	0.34
5	5	"Viciously Passion"	Kim Fields	Tu-Shonda Whitaker & Amaleka McCall	September 14, 2022	0.36
6	6	"Vicious Intent"	Kim Fields	Tu-Shonda Whitaker & Amaleka McCall	September 21, 2022	0.45
7	7	"Vicious Fall"	Kim Fields	Tu-Shonda Whitaker & Amaleka McCall	September 28, 2022	0.38
8	8	"Vicious Rise"	Kim Fields	Tu-Shonda Whitaker & Amaleka McCall	October 5, 2022	0.37

=== Season 2 (2024) ===
No. overall	No. in season	Title	Directed by	Written by	Original release date
9	1	"Vicious Encounters"	Roger Alexander	Jill Ramsey	September 19, 2024
10	2	"Vicious Secrets"	Roger Alexander	Lyric C. Anderson	September 19, 2024
11	3	"Vicious Set-Up"	Roger Alexander	Lyric C. Anderson	September 26, 2024
12	4	"Vicious Intentions"	Roger Alexander	Lyric C. Anderson	October 3, 2024
13	5	"Vicious Life"	Roger Alexander	Lyric C. Anderson	October 10, 2024
14	6	"Vicious Exposure"	Roger Alexander	Lyric C. Anderson	October 17, 2024
15	7	"Vicious Cuts"	Roger Alexander	Dywane D. Birch	October 24, 2024
16	8	"Vicious Showdown"	Roger Alexander	Dywane D. Birch	October 31, 2024

== Production ==
=== Development ===
On May 5, 2021, the series was in development by UrbanflixTV. On August 12, 2022, the series was moved to BET, where it received a series order. The series premiered on August 17, 2022.

On March 25, 2024, the series was renewed for a second season, which premiered on BET+ on September 19, 2024.

=== Casting ===
The main cast was revealed on August 12, 2022.
