= Stevie Baggs =

American gridiron football player (born 1981)

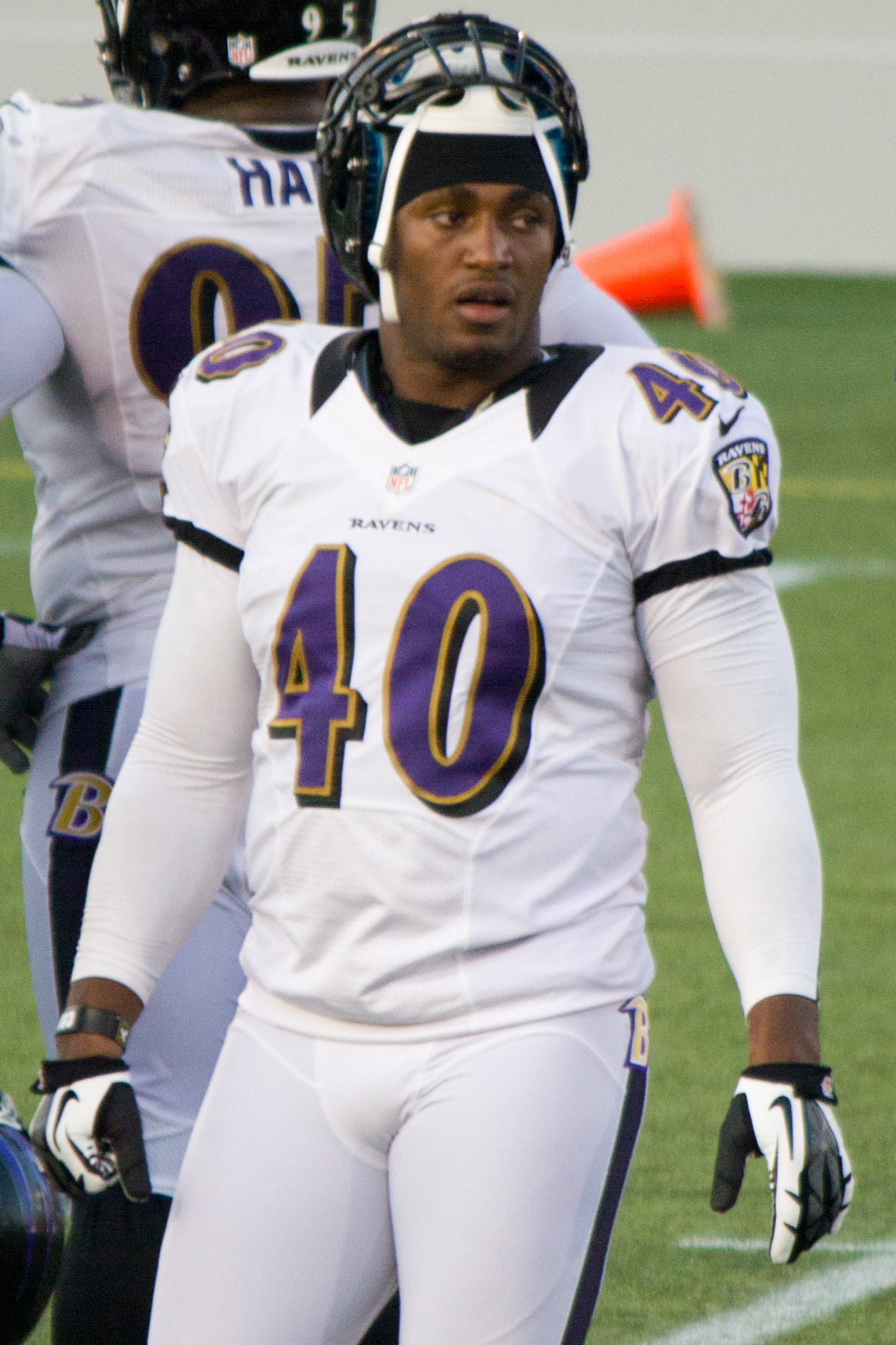
- Baggs during Ravens practice at Navy–Marine Corps Memorial Stadium in August 2012.

Profile
- Position: Linebacker

Personal information
- Born: December 30, 1981 (age 44); Fort Lauderdale, Florida, U.S.
- Listed height: 6 ft 1 in (1.85 m)
- Listed weight: 241 lb (109 kg)

Career information
- College: Bethune-Cookman

Career history
- 2004–2005: Detroit Lions*
- 2005: Jacksonville Jaguars*
- 2006–2007: Winnipeg Blue Bombers
- 2007: Edmonton Eskimos
- 2008–2009: Saskatchewan Roughriders
- 2008: Orlando Predators
- 2010: Arizona Cardinals*
- 2010–2011: Hamilton Tiger-Cats
- 2012: Baltimore Ravens*
- 2012–2013: Calgary Stampeders
- * Offseason or practice squad member only

Awards and highlights
- CFL West All-Star (2009)

Career CFL statistics
- Tackles: 168
- Sacks: 26
- Forced fumbles: 6
- Stats at CFL.ca (archived)
- Stats at ArenaFan.com

Stevie Baggs Jr. (born December 30, 1981) is an American former professional football player and actor.

== Early life ==
Baggs was born and raised in Fort Lauderdale, Florida. He attended Bethune-Cookman University, where he graduated in 2005 with a degree in International Business. During his time at the university, he earned the nickname "Shakespeare" for his performance both on and off the football field.

== College career ==
Baggs played college football at Bethune-Cookman University, where he was a three-time All-American and Mel Blount SBN Defensive Player of the Year and the winner of the Ernie Davis award.

== Professional career ==
Pre-draft measurables
Height	Weight
6 ft 0 3/4 in (1.85 m)	247 lb (112 kg)
Values from Pro Day

=== Detroit Lions ===
He was signed by the Detroit Lions as an undrafted free agent in 2004.

=== Jacksonville Jaguars ===
He was a member of the Jacksonville Jaguars practice squad in 2005.

=== Winnipeg Blue Bombers ===
In 2006, Baggs signed with the Winnipeg Blue Bombers.

=== Edmonton Eskimos ===
He signed and played for the Edmonton Eskimos during the 2007 season.

=== Saskatchewan Roughriders ===
Signed by the Saskatchewan Roughriders as a free agent in September, 2008.h

=== Arizona Cardinals ===
He was signed to the Arizona Cardinals of the NFL for the 2010 season, however was cut before the team finalized its 53-man roster limit.

=== Hamilton Tiger-Cats ===
He played for the Hamilton Tiger-Cats for two seasons from 2010 to 2011.

=== Baltimore Ravens ===
On August 4, 2012, Baggs signed with the Baltimore Ravens

=== Calgary Stampeders ===
On September 7, 2012, Baggs signed as a free agent with the Calgary Stampeders.

== Post-football career ==
Baggs was featured in Season 2 of the reality/dating television series Match Made in Heaven. He has also appeared in television shows such as Love & Hip Hop: Atlanta, Necessary Roughness, and Star. Baggs has had starring roles in Tyler Perry's drama/thriller Ruthless on BET+ and the Netflix series Cobra Kai, and can currently be seen on comedian Kountry Wayne's YouTube series.

He has written two books, Greater Than The Game and Woke.

== Filmography ==
=== Television ===
Year	Title	Role	Notes
2012	Necessary Roughness	Running Back	Episode: "What's Eating You"
2014	The Colorblind Monologues	Cousin Stevie	Episode: "Movin on Up"
2014	For Better or Worse	Officer Baker	Episode: "Who's My Daddy" Pt. 2
2018	Star	Kelvin	"Episode: "All Falls Down"
2018	Coins for Christmas	Male Guest	Television film
2021	Cobra Kai	Andre	Episode: "Miyagi-Do"
2021	The Underground Railroad	Jacob	Episode: "Chapter 2: South Carolina"
2021	Twisted House Sitter	Concierge	Television film
2021	The Game	Dante Simms	3 episodes
2022	Finding Happy	Porter	Main role
2023	Girl in the Closet	Chris	Television film
2023	Whatever It Takes	Samad	Television film
2024	BMF	Officer Hardy	Recurring role
2024	The Really Loud House	Rip Hardcore/Travis	Episode: "Get Out of Dodgeball"
2024	Miss Cleo: Her Rise and Fall	Carl	Television film
2024	Ruthless	Oliver	Main role

=== Film ===
Year	Title	Role	Notes
2014	Getting Even	Richard Parker	
2015	Focus	Coin Toss Thresher	
2015	When I Hold My Ears	Stanley Jones	
2016	Billy Lynn's Long Halftime Walk	Sportscaster (uncredited)	
2017	Love By Chance	Jason	
2017	Dating in Atlanta: The Movie	Broke Man	
2022	A Christmas Prayer	Pint	
2023	80 for Brady	Other Offensive Coach	
2023	The 4th Quarter: Legacy	Bo-Hamilton Cobb	
2024	The Despaired	Jeremiah	
2024	Vampire's House of Cain	Simon	
