= Tami Roman =

American television personality, model, businesswoman and actress (born 1970)

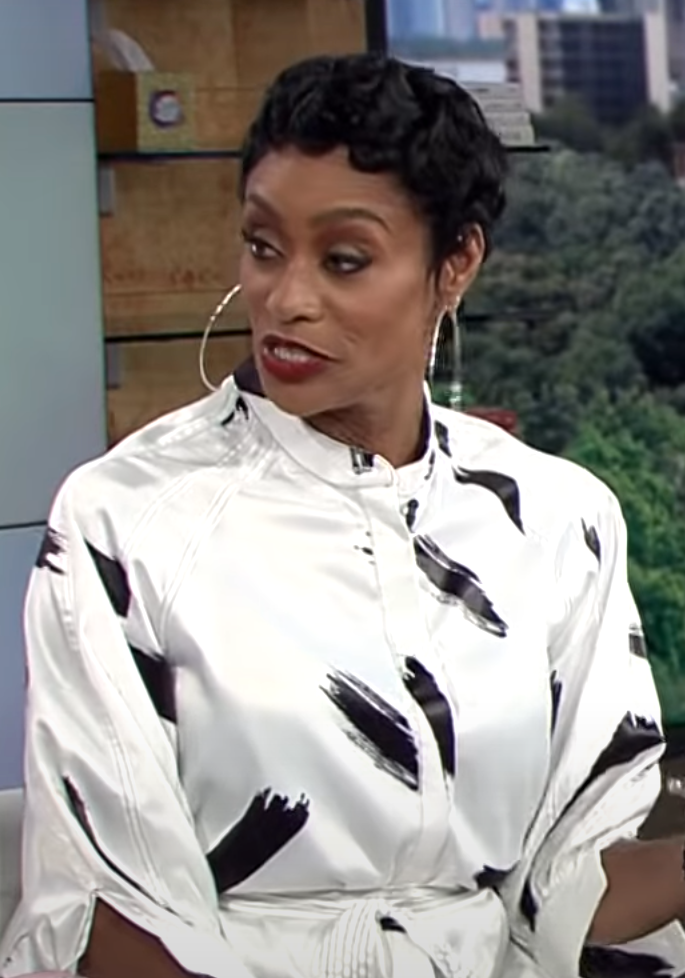
- Roman in 2018
- Born: Tamisha Akbar; April 17, 1970 (age 56); Mount Vernon, New York, U.S.
- Other names: Tami Anderson; Tami Roman Youngblood
- Occupations: Television personality; model; actress; singer; rapper
- Years active: 1993–present
- Spouses: Kenny Anderson (m. 1994; div. 2001); Reggie Youngblood (m. 2018)
- Children: 2
- Website: officialtamiroman.com

Tamisha Akbar Youngblood (née Akbar; born April 17, 1970), known professionally as Tami Roman, is an American television personality, model, actress, singer, businesswoman and producer. She first gained fame on The Real World: Los Angeles in 1993. After making appearances and landing supporting roles in various television shows and films in the 1990s and 2000s, she became one of the breakout stars of VH1's Basketball Wives (2010–2019). Roman later starred in the television series The Family Business (2018–present), Truth Be Told (2019–2023), Haus of Vicious (2022–present) and The Ms. Pat Show (2021–present).

== Career ==
=== Acting and reality television career ===
After securing and subsequently losing an acting role in 1991 classic Boyz n the Hood, Roman reportedly began taking acting classes from notable actress and director Chip Fields. Fields would later assist Roman to parlay her TV fame into a legitimate acting career. Roman gained more fame as she appeared as the dealer on the 2001 revival of Card Sharks, and on several other shows, including an episode of One on One (season 3, episode 4) and UPN’s original tv series, The Parkers, as Dina (season 1, episode 14). In 2010, Roman became one of the main cast members on the VH1 reality series Basketball Wives. She was then cast on the Basketball Wives spinoff Basketball Wives LA, starting with the fourth season in 2015. Roman appeared on two episodes of the CBS show Extant. Roman could also be heard on Tami Roman's Love Talk & Hot Jamz with advice columnist and rapper Willie D of the Geto Boys and Reggie Youngblood. The show aired on Houston's KCOH Radio. Roman and her boyfriend Reggie Youngblood appeared on Marriage Boot Camp: Reality Stars for its third season, which premiered May 29, 2015. Roman plans to release both hair and cosmetic lines.

After Roman released a series of parody short films titled "Bonnet Chronicles" on Instagram, the videos were produced into a scripted series on TIDAL in 2018.

In 2018, Roman was cast as London Duncan-Grant in the BET crime drama series, The Family Business. In 2019, she had a recurring role opposite Vanessa Bell Calloway in the Bounce TV prime time soap opera, Saints & Sinners. Later that year, Roman joined the cast of Apple TV+ drama series, Truth Be Told starring opposite Octavia Spencer. The series ended in 2023. In 2021, Roman was cast in the BET+ comedy series, The Ms. Pat Show starring comedian Ms. Pat, playing her sister, Denise. Roman almost didn’t get the part because Ms. Pat refused to have any reality TV stars a part of her cast. Although Ms. Pat Show’s executive producer, Jordan Cooper, wrote Denise with Roman in mind based on her popular Bonnet Chronicles. Also in 2021, Roman founded production company Roman Ramsey Productions. Her first project was the talk-show Get Into It with Tami Roman for Fox Soul.

In 2022, Roman starred and executive produced the BET drama series, Haus of Vicious. Later that year she had a supporting role in the drama film Bid For Love for BET+. In 2023, Roman produced and went to star in the Lifetime thriller film Girl in the Closet playing the role of sadistic and evil aunt of title character. Also in 2023, Roman starred and executive produced the BET+ films Whatever It Takes and So Fly Christmas.

=== Girl Groups: Reality / Female ===
Reality / Female
- Origin: Los Angeles, California, United States
- Genres: R&B, soul
- Label: Mercury Records (Former)
- Past members: Tami Roman; Monique Johnson; Donyell Floyd; Carlett Martin

During her time on The Real World: Los Angeles, Roman formed her own "En Vogue-esque" R&B girl group quartet called Reality. Roman herself was one of the members (alongside Monique Johnson, Donyell Floyd, and Carlett Martin), and the rapper of the group as well. The group would subsequently sign a record contract with Mercury Records, and Roman changed the group's name from Reality to Female. Upon signing, they were offered the opportunity to join other African-American girl groups in recording the remake of R&B singer Joi's song "Freedom" for the motion picture soundtrack album, Panther. The song featured other R&B girl groups such as En Vogue, SWV, TLC, For Real, Xscape, Brownstone, Y?N-Vee, and Changing Faces alongside solo vocalists such as Mary J. Blige, Monica and Aaliyah. Roman's group also participated in cover versions of "If I Were Your Woman" and "(You Make Me Feel Like) A Natural Woman" by Aretha Franklin for the film. No group album materialized after the release of the film soundtrack.

== Personal life ==
Roman has been married twice and has two children. On August 26, 1993, Roman married NBA player Kenny Anderson and together they had two daughters, Lyric Chanel (b. 1994) and Jazz Lauren (b. 1996). Roman and Anderson later divorced in February 2001. Roman met and started dating Reggie Youngblood in 2013. They got married on August 17, 2018 in Las Vegas, which was documented on their spinoff special "Tami Ever After".

Roman was inducted as an honorary member of Sigma Gamma Rho on July 24, 2026, at their 61st Biennial Boule in Tampa, Florida.

== Filmography ==
=== Film ===
Year	Title	Role	Notes
2001	MacArthur Park	Rose	
2001	Tara	Judge Bankhead	
2001	Sacred Is the Flesh	May	
2003	Hot Parts	Midnight	Video
2004	Hair Show	Zora	
2005	Tears of a Clown	Carolyn Black	
2006	One Foot in, One Foot Out	Valerie	Short
2006	The Last Stand	DeDe Calvin	
2007	South of Pico	Irene	
2010	Something Like a Business	Prosecutor	
2012	Life, Love, Soul	Renee Jackson	
2013	Sunday's at Noon	Mona	Short
2015	Play Date	Jennifer	Short
2016	Beyond the Game	Reality Presenter	
2016	ANYWHERE, U.S.A.	Coco	Short
2017	When Love Kills: The Falicia Blakely Story	Stacey	TV movie
2017	Just Within Reach	Viola	
2018	District	Tasha	
2018	Tijuana Jackson: Purpose Over Prison	Sharea Jackson	
2019	Fall Girls	Linda	
2022	Bid for Love	Dr. Simone	
2023	Girl in the Closet	Mia Smith	TV movie
2023	So Fly Christmas	Dione	TV movie
2023	Whatever It Takes	Tracy	TV movie
2024	Dying to Be Famous	Darlene	
2026	Double Double Trouble	Ali/Drea	TV movie

=== Television ===
Year	Title	Role	Notes
1993	The Real World: Los Angeles	Herself	Main Cast: Season 2
1993	Married... with Children	Meg	Episode: "Scared Single"
1994	Silk Stalkings	Sally	Episode: "The Scarlet Shadow"
2000	The Parkers	Dina	Episode: "Love Is a Royal Pain"
2001	The Steve Harvey Show	Bernadette	Episode: "Not the Best Man"
2002	The Drew Carey Show	Susan	Episode: "What Women Don't Want"
2003	E! True Hollywood Story	Herself	Episode: "Real World"
2003	VH1 Goes Inside	Herself	Episode: "Real World"
2003	Sabrina the Teenage Witch	Saleslady #1	Episode: "You Slay Me"
2003	One on One	Elizabeth	Episode: "PTAmore"
2004	Half & Half	Spice	Episode: "The Big Type Cast Episode"
2004	JAG	Beauty Tech	Episode: "Hard Time"
2005	Summerland	Leslie Sloan	Episode: "What's Past Is Prologue"
2005	Sex, Love & Secrets	Angela	Recurring Cast
2007–08	Moonlight	Maureen "Mo" Williams	Recurring Cast
2010–19	Basketball Wives	Herself	Main Cast: Season 2-8
2011	Love That Girl!	-	Episode: "Dilemma Date"
2013	David Tutera's Celebrations	Herself	Episode: "Super Sweet Sixteen Plus 1"
2013	Belle's	Loreta Cooper	Main Cast
2013	Tiny Tonight	Herself/Co-Host	Main Co-Host
2014	Extant	Cass Hendry	Episode: "Re-Entry" & "Wish You Were Here"
2015	Celebrity Wife Swap	Herself	Episode: "Tami Roman/Kerri Walsh-Jennings"
2015	Marriage Boot Camp: Reality Stars	Herself	Main Cast: Season 3
2015–16	Basketball Wives LA	Herself	Recurring Cast: Season 4, Main Cast: Season 5
2017	Ridiculousness	Herself	Episode: "Tami Roman"
2017	District	Tasha	Main Cast
2017	Tales	Silk	Episode: "All I Need"
2017–18	Wild 'n Out	Herself/Team Captain	Guest Cast: Season 9-10
2018	Steve	Herself/Panelist	Episode: "Episode #1.132"
2018	TiTi Do You Love Me	Herself	Episode: "Stripping Two Away"
2018	Bonnet Chronicles on Tidal	Betty	Main Cast
2018–present	The Family Business	London Duncan-Grant	Main Cast
2019	Uncensored	Herself	Episode: "Tami Roman"
2019	Love & Hip Hop: Atlanta	Herself/Host	Episode: "Love & Hip Hop Awards: Most Certified"
2019	Martha & Snoop's Potluck Dinner Party	Herself/Guest Judge	Episode: "Halloween Food Fight"
2019	Saints & Sinners	Felicia Thompson	Recurring Cast: Season 4
2019–23	Truth Be Told	Lillian "Lily" Scoville	Recurring Cast: Seasons 1 & 3, Main Cast: Season 2
2020	RuPaul's Secret Celebrity Drag Race	Herself/Miss Shenita Cocktail	Episode: "Rusical"
2021	The Mediator	Herself	Episode: "Mommy ATM-No-More"
2021	For Real: The Story of Reality TV	Herself	Episode: "Is It Real?" & "How the Other Half Lives"
2021	Get Into It with Tami Roman	Herself/Host	Main Host
2021	Entertainment Tonight	Herself/Guest Co-Host	Episode: "Episode #41.56"
2021	The Real	Herself/Guest Co-Host	Episode: "Episode #8.46" & "#8.47"
2021–22	The Real World Homecoming: Los Angeles	Herself	Main Cast
2021–present	The Ms. Pat Show	Denise Ford	Main Cast
2022	The Real Housewives of Atlanta	Herself	Episode: "The Edge of Fashion"
2022–24	Haus of Vicious	Chantel Vivian	Main Cast
2022–25	Caught in the Act: Unfaithful	Herself/Host	Main Host

== Accolades ==
Year	Awards	Category	Recipient	Outcome
2022	MTV Movie & TV Awards	MTV Movie & TV Awards for Best Reality Return	The Real World Homecoming: Los Angeles	Nominated
2024	Black Reel Awards	Black Reel Awards for Outstanding Supporting Performance in a Comedy Series	The Ms. Pat Show	Nominated

== See also ==
- List of Puerto Ricans
