= Evelyn Lozada =

American television personality

- Born: Evelyn Alexandra Lozada; December 10, 1975 (age 50); New York City, U.S.
- Occupations: Television personality; model; spokesmodel
- Years active: 2009–present
- Known for: Basketball Wives
- Spouse: Chad Johnson (m. 2012; div. 2012)
- Partners: Antoine Walker (1998–2008); Carl Crawford (2013–2017)
- Children: 2
- Website: evelynlozada.com

Evelyn Alexandra Lozada (born December 10, 1975) is an American television personality, model, and spokesperson. Lozada is best known as one of the six main cast members in the VH1 reality series Basketball Wives throughout its run beginning in 2010.

== Early life ==
Lozada was born in Brooklyn and raised in The Bronx to Nengo Lozada and Sylvia Ferrera. Lozada was raised with her sister by her mother. Lozada is of Puerto Rican ancestry. She moved to Miami in 2007. She worked as a secretary to an entertainment attorney, and later became co-owner of Dulce, a shoe boutique located in Coral Gables, Florida. Lozada was raised as a Catholic.

== Career ==
=== Television ===
Lozada starred in Basketball Wives, an American reality television series franchise on VH1 for five seasons, before joining the cast of Basketball Wives LA for four seasons. After quitting the show in 2021, she returned to the franchise again in 2023, for the second time, as she joined the eleventh season. Another reality television show, Ev and Ocho, which had been planned to follow the lives of her and former husband Chad Johnson, never aired amidst their divorce. Lozada was the center of a third reality television series, Livin' Lozada, with her daughter, Shaniece, which ran for two seasons in 2015–2016. In September 2012, Lozada appeared on the television show Iyanla: Fix My Life where she discussed her personal life and sought emotional healing with Iyanla Vanzant.

=== Books ===
Lozada and her brand strategist, Courtney Parker, wrote the 2012 novel The Wives Association: Inner Circle. Released by Cash Money Content books, the novel follows a young woman who marries a football star and then forms a group of other sports wives - The Wives Association. In 2019, Lozada published the novel, The Perfect Date which was co-written with Holly Lorincz. In 2020, Lozada is scheduled to publish another novel co-written with Holly Lorincz entitled The Wrong Mr. Darcy.

=== Activism ===
In December 2012, Lozada posed for PETA's "I'd Rather Go Naked than Wear Fur" campaign. In September 2017, Lozada launched the Turn Hurt Into Joy online campaign to raise money for domestic violence and sexual assault survivors.

== Personal life ==
Lozada has a daughter, Shaniece Virginia Sabina Hairston (b. 1993), from a previous relationship with Jamal Hairston. Lozada was engaged to NBA player Antoine Walker, with whom she had a ten-year relationship, from 1998 until 2008.

In 2012, Lozada was briefly married to NFL receiver Chad Johnson, being married in St. Martin on July 4, 2012 with their divorce being finalized on September 19, 2012.

Lozada began dating MLB player Carl Crawford in 2013. In December 2013, Lozada and Crawford announced their engagement. Lozada gave birth to their son on March 22, 2014. In August 2017, Lozada and Crawford called off the engagement.

After co-starring in the Peacock's original series, Queens Court, Lozada became engaged to LaVon Lewis, one of the show's contestants.

Lozada is the grandmother to daughter Shaniece Hairston's son, born in December 2024; the child's biological father is Compton rapper The Game.
