= Basketball Wives LA season 5 =

Basketball Wives LA
- Season 5
- Cover used by ITunes Store
- Starring: Malaysia Pargo; Brandi Maxiell; Jackie Christie; Angel Brinks; LaTosha Duffey; Angel Love; Tami Roman; Shaunie O'Neal
- No. of episodes: 16

Release
- Original network: VH1
- Original release: July 17 – October 23, 2016

Season chronology
- ← Previous; Season 4 Next → Season 6

The fifth season of the reality television series Basketball Wives LA aired on VH1 from July 17, 2016, until October 23, 2016. It follows the lives of a group of women who have all been somehow romantically linked to professional basketball players.

It was executively produced by Pam Healey, Sean Rankine, Amanda Scott, Shaunie O'Neal, Mark Seliga, and Lisa Shannon.

== Production ==
Basketball Wives LA was revealed on June 20, 2011, with Kimsha Artest, Gloria Govan, Laura Govan, Jackie Christie and Imani Showalter as the cast. Malaysia Pargo and Draya Michele were announced as part of the cast in the series' July 2011 press release. Kimsha Artest stopped showing up for filming because she did not agree with the "shenanigans and drama", which explains why she was not featured in more than one episode. Tanya Williams was to be the eighth official "wife" but left the series after two episodes. The series premiered on August 29, 2011, to 1.81 million viewers.

== Cast ==
=== Main ===
- Malaysia Pargo: Ex-Wife of Jannero Pargo
- Brandi Maxiell: Wife of Jason Maxiell
- Jackie Christie: Wife of Doug Christie
- Angel Brinks: Ex-Girlfriend of Tyreke Evans
- LaTosha Duffey: Fiancée of Iman Shokuohizadeh
- Angel Love: Girlfriend of DeJuan Blair
- Tami Roman: Ex-Wife of Kenny Anderson
- Shaunie O'Neal: Ex-Wife of Shaquille O'Neal

== Episodes ==
No. overall	No. in season	Title	Original release date	U.S. viewers (millions)
55	1	"Season Premiere"	July 17, 2016	1.58
Brandi debates returning to LA after her fight with Shaunie. Jackie's husband Doug is offered a new job. Angel Brinks and Malaysia have lingering drama. Tami Roman is back with her boo, Reggie Youngblood, hoping for a baby. Tami Roman and Angel Brinks are promoted to main cast members. Angel Love and LaTosha Duffey are added to the opening credits replacing departing cast members Mehgan James and Draya Michele
56	2	"Episode 2"	July 24, 2016	0.92
Brandi throws a Welcome to L.A. party for her "sister" Duffey but Malaysia's attitude at the event is anything but welcoming. Brandi's ex Jason returns from playing ball in China hoping to rekindle their relationship, but Brandi's not ready to take him back. Jackie surprises Doug with the purchase of a downtown condo.
57	3	"Episode 3"	July 24, 2016	1.17
Brandi must defend Malaysia's behavior at the Welcome to L.A. party to "sister" and newcomer Duffey. Malaysia and Angel Brinks finally sit down together in an attempt to put their long-standing feud to rest. Angel Brinks holds a launch party for her clothing line, but drama between Brandi and newcomer Angel Love threatens to derail the entire event.
58	4	"Episode 4"	July 31, 2016	1.11
Angel Brinks's launch party continues and tensions run high as Brandi goes off on Angel Love for voicing her opinion. When Malaysia shows up in sweatpants and sneakers to defend her bestie Brandi, Duffey's opinion about Malaysia changes for the better. Jackie convinces Shaunie and Brandi to sit down to finally hash out their problems and it turns into an all-out showdown.
59	5	"Episode 5"	August 7, 2016	1.13
Malaysia proposes the ladies take a "peace trip" to Big Bear Lake, CA. Shaunie and Brandi let bygones be bygones. Angel Brinks gets mad when her relationship with her baby daddy is called into question.
60	6	"Episode 6"	August 14, 2016	1.26
Tempers flare at Big Bare Lake when Angel Love goes head-to-head with Malaysia, Brandi and Duffey. Duffey offers to direct a music video for Tami's daughter Jazz. Jackie tries to broker peace between Duffey and Love.
61	7	"Episode 7"	August 21, 2016	1.18
Angel Brinks starts to plan her big anniversary party. Tami and Duffey collaborate on Tami's daughter Jazz's music video. Doug breaks the news to Jackie that he is definitely taking a coaching position that will take him away.
62	8	"Episode 8"	August 28, 2016	1.16
Angel Brinks host a star-studded event to celebrate her fifth anniversary of her clothing company. Tami and Reggie visit a fertility doctor. Jackie seeks the advice of an energy healer to get to the root of her emotional issues.
63	9	"Episode 9"	September 11, 2016	1.52
Jackie's violent display at Angel Brinks's anniversary party causes a rift between Jackie and the Angels. Brandi and Duffey plan a Dallas-style "Grillz & Grills" BBQ. Tami confronts Duffey about her daughters music video.
64	10	"Episode 10"	September 18, 2016	1.46
Things get physical when Tami fires Duffey from her daughter's music video. Angel Brinks and Angel Love finally have it out with Jackie after her nasty and humiliating breakdown at Angel Brinks's anniversary party. Tami hustles to finish her daughter's music video in time for the upcoming release party.
65	11	"Episode 11"	September 25, 2016	1.09
Tami gets some interesting and scandalous information from an old friend. Jackie is willing to try anything to lose weight in order to keep Doug interested. At Tami's daughter's video release party, Angel Brinks gets blindsided and Jackie finds herself in the line of fire again.
66	12	"Episode 12"	September 25, 2016	1.45
The limits of Malaysia's friendship are tested when Jackie asks her to be by her side during a very personal weight loss procedure. Duffey apologizes to Tami's daughter Jazz in an attempt to make things right with Tami after their altercation. Doug takes Jackie on a romantic date and reveals a huge surprise.
67	13	"Episode 13"	October 2, 2016	1.68
As the ladies all prepare for their trip to Portugal, Malaysia attempts to broker a peace between Tami and Duffey. Soon after her arrival, Duffey has second thoughts about her decision to come on the trip.
68	14	"Episode 14"	October 9, 2016	1.61
The ladies explore Portugal and try to relax, but the tension between Duffey and Tami has everyone on edge. Jackie fears the worst when she can't get ahold of Doug. Tami finally confronts Duffey in an explosive showdown.
69	15	"Season Finale"	October 16, 2016	1.82
After Tami and Duffey fight, Jackie must decide which one of them can stay with the group and which one must return home. The results of a pregnancy test threaten to change everything for Tami. Doug surprises Jackie with a dream wedding in Portugal.
70	16	"The Reunion"	October 23, 2016	1.78
Marc Lamont Hill hosts the reunion for season five. The ladies reunite on stage to take you inside the most talked about drama from the season. Tami and Duffey come face to face for the first time since their epic rooftop battle in Portugal. Jackie tries to defend her outlandish behavior while Angel Love and Brandi face off in an explosive argument. Shaunie O'Neal makes it known who she doesn't want back. This episodes marks the final appearance of Angel Love.
