= Basketball Wives season 7 =

Basketball Wives
- Season 7
- Cover used by iTunes Store
- Starring: Malaysia Pargo; Jackie Christie; Jennifer Williams; Tami Roman; Evelyn Lozada; Shaunie O'Neal
- No. of episodes: 16

Release
- Original network: VH1
- Original release: May 14 – September 16, 2018

Season chronology
- ← Previous; Season 6 Next → Season 8

The seventh season of the reality television series Basketball Wives aired on VH1 from May 14, 2018 until September 16, 2018. The season was primarily filmed in Los Angeles, California. It was executively produced by Mark Seliga, Pam Healey, Shaunie O'Neal, Amanda Scott, and Sean Rankine.

The show chronicles the lives of a group of women who are the wives and girlfriends, or have been romantically linked to, professional basketball players in the National Basketball Association, though the title of the series does not make this differentiation, solely referring to the women as "wives".

== Production ==
Basketball Wives debuted on April 11, 2010, with thirty-minute episodes. The second season premiered on December 12, 2010, with expanded sixty-minute episodes and featured new cast member Tami Roman. Season 3 made its debut on May 30, 2011, with new cast member Meeka Claxton. The fourth season premiered on February 20, 2012, with two new cast members, Kenya Bell and Kesha Nichols and the departure of Claxton. The fifth season premiered on August 19, 2013, with Tasha Marbury joining the cast. According to a tweet from Tami Roman, the show has been quietly though officially cancelled.

On March 27, 2017, VH1 announced that the series would be returning after nearly four years off-air on April 17, with Evelyn Lozada, Shaunie O'Neal, Tami Roman, Jackie Christie and Malaysia Pargo returning to the franchise.

== Cast ==
=== Main cast ===
- Malaysia Pargo: Ex-Wife of Jannero Pargo
- Jackie Christie: Wife of Doug Christie
- Jennifer Williams: Ex-Wife of Eric Williams
- Tami Roman: Ex-Wife of Kenny Anderson
- Evelyn Lozada: Ex-Fiancée of Carl Crawford
- Shaunie O'Neal: Ex-Wife of Shaquille O'Neal

=== Recurring cast ===
- Kristen Scott: Wife of Thomas Scott
- CeCe Gutierrez: Fiancée of Byron Scott
- Ogom "OG" Chijindu: Girlfriend of Kwame Alexander

== Episodes ==
No. overall	No. in season	Title	Original release date	U.S. viewers (millions)
79	1	"Season Premiere"	May 14, 2018	1.87
80	2	"Episode 2"	May 21, 2018	1.71
81	3	"Episode 3"	May 28, 2018	1.59
82	4	"Episode 4"	June 4, 2018	1.82
83	5	"Episode 5"	June 11, 2018	1.96
84	6	"Episode 6"	June 25, 2018	1.89
85	7	"Episode 7"	July 2, 2018	1.86
86	8	"Episode 8"	July 8, 2018	1.06
87	9	"Episode 9"	July 16, 2018	1.67
88	10	"Episode 10"	July 30, 2018	1.59
89	11	"Episode 11"	August 5, 2018	0.94
90	12	"Episode 12"	August 12, 2018	0.90
91	13	"Episode 13"	August 19, 2018	0.92
92	14	"Episode 14"	August 26, 2018	1.07
93	15	"Episode 15"	September 2, 2018	0.86
94	16	"Season Finale"	September 9, 2018	1.09
95	17	"The Reunion"	September 16, 2018	1.17
