= Basketball Wives season 8 =

Basketball Wives
- Season 8
- Cover used by iTunes Store
- Starring: Malaysia Pargo; Jackie Christie; Jennifer Williams; Tami Roman; Evelyn Lozada; Shaunie O'Neal

Release
- Original network: VH1
- Original release: June 19 – October 16, 2019

Season chronology
- ← Previous; Season 7

The eighth season of the reality television series Basketball Wives premiered on VH1 on June 19, 2019. The season was primarily filmed in Los Angeles, California. It was executively produced by Mark Seliga, Pam Healey, Shaunie O'Neal, Amanda Scott, and Sean Rankine.

The show chronicles the lives of a group of women who are the wives and girlfriends, or have been romantically linked to, professional basketball players in the National Basketball Association, though the title of the series does not make this differentiation, solely referring to the women as "wives".

== Production ==
Basketball Wives debuted on April 11, 2010, with thirty-minute episodes. The second season premiered on December 12, 2010, with expanded sixty-minute episodes and featured new cast member Tami Roman. Season 3 made its debut on May 30, 2011, with new cast member Meeka Claxton. The fourth season premiered on February 20, 2012, with two new cast members, Kenya Bell and Kesha Nichols and the departure of Claxton. The fifth season premiered on August 19, 2013, with Tasha Marbury joining the cast. According to a tweet from Tami Roman, the show has been quietly though officially cancelled.

On March 27, 2017, VH1 announced that the series would be returning after nearly four years off-air on April 17, with Evelyn Lozada, Shaunie O'Neal, Tami Roman, Jackie Christie and Malaysia Pargo returning to the franchise.

== Cast ==
=== Main cast ===
- Malaysia Pargo: Ex-Wife of Jannero Pargo
- Jackie Christie: Wife of Doug Christie
- Jennifer Williams: Ex-Wife of Eric Williams
- Tami Roman: Ex-Wife of Kenny Anderson
- Evelyn Lozada: Ex-Fiancée of Carl Crawford
- Shaunie O'Neal: Ex-Wife of Shaquille O'Neal

=== Recurring cast ===
- Kristen Scott: Wife of Thomas Scott
- CeCe Gutierrez: Fiancee of Byron Scott
- Ogom "OG" Chijindu: Girlfriend of Kwame Alexander
- Feby Torres: Ex-Girlfriend of Lance Stephenson

=== Guest ===
- Dominique Lenard: Ex-Wife of Voshon Lenard
- Vinessa Sacre: Wife of Robert Sacre

== Episodes ==
No. overall	No. in season	Title	Original release date	U.S. viewers (millions)
96	1	"Season Premiere"	June 19, 2019	0.97
Shaunie deals with her son Shareef's devastating diagnosis. Tami keeps a major secret from the ladies. Kristen's invite to Cece's wedding gets revoked. Jen returns to reignite old flames.
97	2	"Episode 2"	June 26, 2019	0.99
Tami faces her daughters after secretly getting married without them. Malaysia's attempts at mending the peace with her family leads to more drama. Jen battles emotional demons from her past.
98	3	"Episode 3"	July 3, 2019	0.70
Evelyn hosts an event for her new business venture, but things go completely haywire when OG drops a bomb on the Scott Family. Tami deals with the reality of her ex's serious health scare.
99	4	"Episode 4"	July 10, 2019	0.93
A series of robberies causes Shaunie and her family to pick up and move. The group eyes Cece as the source of the rumor about Thomas.
100	5	"Episode 5"	July 17, 2019	1.06
The Scott family is noticeably absent at Cece and Bryon's engagement party, leading Malaysia to confront OG. Shaunie plans a getaway trip to calm the tension amongst the group but when Jen shows up, Evelyn has her boxing gloves ready.
101	6	"Episode 6"	July 24, 2019	1.04
Kristen's hope for a Scott family resolution is renewed when she receives some promising news about Bryon. Jen's plus one raises eyebrows. Evelyn and Jen come face to face in San Diego and no one is safe.
102	7	"Episode 7"	July 31, 2019	0.99
Byron sets the record straight about his role in the Thomas rumor. Malaysia refuses to forgive and forget her issues with Jennifer.
103	8	"Episode 8"	August 7, 2019	1.09
Shaunie and the entire O'Neal family celebrate a huge milestone in Shareef's recovery. Tami dives head first into a new creative venture. Jackie forces Feby to face the musicto: ShowBuzzDaily's Top 150 Wednesday Cable Originals & Network Finals: 8.7.
104	9	"Episode 9"	August 14, 2019	1.23
Someone is spreading rumors about Malaysia and her kids. OG and Cece reach a crossroads in their friendship.
105	10	"Episode 10"	August 21, 2019	1.31
Peace may still be possible for the Scotts after Byron and Thomas take a step forward in their relationship. Evelyn faces her ex's daughter after years of estrangement. Malaysia and Jen air out their issues, and Jackie plans to clear her name.
106	11	"Episode 11"	August 28, 2019	1.18
Malaysia and Evelyn question Jennifer's motives for getting back in the circle. Kwame returns home to find OG planning moves for their future together. A malicious article hits the blogs about Malaysia.
107	12	"Episode 12"	September 4, 2019	1.07
Shaunie and Evelyn are ready to find Mr. Right. Kristen and Thomas call a final family meeting in efforts to fix things once and for all. Jackie receives devastating news that may change her friendship with Evelyn for good.
108	13	"Episode 13"	September 11, 2019	1.07
Jen finds herself at odds with Evelyn and Malaysia when photos from her Sip 'n Shop surface with her face edited out. OG feels burned by the group when no one shows support at her retirement gala. This episode marks the final appearance of Tami.
109	14	"Episode 14"	September 18, 2019	1.23
The ladies arrive in Costa Rica where the division among the group is worse than ever. Cece takes a aim at Evelyn for butting into her family business. Feby takes shots at Jackie.
110	15	"Episode 15"	September 25, 2019	1.13
Shaunie, Evelyn, Malaysia, Feby, and Kristen may have lost the battle against the other ladies, but they are determined to win the war as they plot ways to take down Cece, OG and Jackie.
111	16	"Season Finale"	October 2, 2019	1.23
Evelyn has printed receipts that prove OG might not only be a cheater but a home wrecker too. Kristen makes a decision that will forever affect her future with Cece and Byron. Jackie finds herself in the middle of two opposing sides.
112	17	"Reunion – Part 1"	October 9, 2019	1.34
Jennifer clears up what she said about Shaunie's relationship with her ex. Feby calls Jackie out on a lie. OG is forced to make a decision. This episode marks the final appearance of CeCe.
113	18	"Reunion – Part 2"	October 16, 2019	1.21
Jackie attempts to prove her innocence. Malaysia and Jen face off. One of the ladies makes an unexpected exit. Host Marc Lamont Hill sits down with Shaunie to discuss the impact of colorism within the African American community.
