= Basketball Wives LA season 4 =

Basketball Wives LA
- Season 4
- Cover used by ITunes Store
- Starring: Malaysia Pargo; Draya Michele; Brandi Maxiell; Mehgan James; Jackie Christie; Shaunie O'Neal
- No. of episodes: 13

Release
- Original network: VH1
- Original release: July 12 – October 11, 2015

Season chronology
- ← Previous; Season 3 Next → Season 5

The fourth season of the reality television series Basketball Wives LA aired on VH1 from July 12, 2015, until October 11, 2015. It follows the lives of a group of women who have all been somehow romantically linked to professional basketball players.

It was executively produced by Pam Healey, Sean Rankine, Amanda Scott, Shaunie O'Neal, Mark Seliga, and Lisa Shannon.

== Production ==
Basketball Wives LA was revealed on June 20, 2011, with Kimsha Artest, Gloria Govan, Laura Govan, Jackie Christie and Imani Showalter as the cast. Malaysia Pargo and Draya Michele were announced as part of the cast in the series' July 2011 press release. Kimsha Artest stopped showing up for filming because she did not agree with the "shenanigans and drama", which explains why she was not featured in more than one episode. Tanya Williams was to be the eighth official "wife" but left the series after two episodes. The series premiered on August 29, 2011, to 1.81 million viewers.

== Cast ==
=== Main ===
- Malaysia Pargo: Wife of Jannero Pargo
- Draya Michele: Girlfriend of Orlando Scandrick
- Brandi Maxiell: Wife of Jason Maxiell
- Mehgan James: Ex-Girlfriend of Kedrick Brown
- Jackie Christie: Wife of Doug Christie
- Shaunie O'Neal: Ex-Wife of Shaquille O'Neal

=== Recurring cast ===
- Tami Roman: Ex-Wife of Kenny Anderson
- Angel Brinks: Ex-Girlfriend of Tyreke Evans
- Patrice Curry: Wife of Eddy Curry

== Episodes ==
No. overall	No. in season	Title	Original release date	U.S. viewers (millions)
42	1	"Season Premiere"	July 12, 2015	1.90
Jackie desperately tries to work her way back into the group's good graces after causing so much trouble in Paris and at the reunion. Malaysia and Brandi refuse to speak with Jackie unless she agrees to some stipulations. Mehgan James and Shaunie O'Neal are added to the opening credits replacing departing cast members Sundy Carter and Brittish Williams. Although credited, Shaunie does not appear.
43	2	"Episode 2"	July 19, 2015	1.11
Jackie shoots her first commercial for her cognac and is overwhelmed by the chaos of directing. Draya pushes an emotionally ravaged Malaysia to her breaking point and a first time fight ensues between the besties.
44	3	"Episode 3"	July 26, 2015	1.23
Malaysia finally agrees to meet with Jackie to discuss their issues, but makes no promises about friendship moving forward. Shaunie O'Neal joins the LA ladies and learns that the drama is strong within the group.
45	4	"Episode 4"	August 2, 2015	1.46
Shaunie O'Neal joins the LA ladies and learns that the drama is strong within the group. Jackie premieres her commercial, but things go sour when Mehgan finds out what Draya said behind her back. This episode marks the first appearance of Shaunie
46	5	"Episode 5"	August 9, 2015	1.36
Brandi and Malaysia see a new side to their bestie Draya when they realize that she's out for herself. A playful game of Q and A turns physical when Mehgan gets called a liar, again.
47	6	"Episode 6"	August 16, 2015	1.24
Santa Barbara comes to a quick and dramatic end when Draya prompts Mehgan to question Jackie's loyalty. Patrice opens up about the difficulties of having a mixed family and her hopes of someday adopting her husband's son.
48	7	"Episode 7"	August 23, 2015	1.43
Brandi and Mehgan bond over their hatred of crazy Jackie and Mehgan plots her revenge. Draya's selfish ways are put on blast by Malaysia and Brandi and everyone starts to question if she's ever been a loyal friend.
49	8	"Episode 8"	August 30, 2015	1.46
Draya says some unforgivable things that leave her fledgling friendships on the line. Brandi and Jason try to reconcile their differences in couples therapy. Shaunie watches her oldest son Myles grow up from a boy to a man. This episode marks The final appearance of Draya
50	9	"Episode 9"	September 13, 2015	1.34
Brandi wins the group's support when the truth about Draya is revealed. Tensions arise when Malaysia disses Angel's risqué lingerie line. Shaunie, still wary of the LA girls, brings in her old Miami friend Tami Roman for backup.
51	10	"Episode 10"	September 20, 2015	1.31
Malaysia kicks Jackie out of her bedding-line launch party. Shaunie hopes to bring some resolve to the group now that Draya is gone and asks the ladies to join her on a trip to Puerto Rico. A Miami and LA divide starts to form.
52	11	"Episode 11"	September 27, 2015	1.46
Angel attempts to defend her character but is quickly put in the hot seat. Jackie and Malaysia grow sick of their differences and try to finally mend fences. Tempers flare and the beef between Mehgan and Angel comes to a head.
53	12	"Season Finale"	October 4, 2015	1.49
Mehgan finally pushes Angel to her breaking point. A second beach brawl ignites when Brandi and Malaysia confront Tami and Shaunie. Brandi can't hold back her feelings and uses some choice words which do not bode well for her.
54	13	"The Reunion"	October 11, 2015	1.75
Mehgan shocks the ladies with something she found online and tensions between Tami and Brandi explode over talk of Draya. Shaunie and Brandi see each other for the first time since Puerto Rico. Hosted by John Salley. This episode marks The final appearances of Mehgan
