= List of Basketball Wives LA episodes =

Basketball Wives LA is an American reality television series on VH1. It chronicles the lives of women who have been romantically linked to professional basketball players in the National Basketball Association, based in Los Angeles, California.

Developed as the second installment of the Basketball Wives franchise, the Los Angeles-based spin-off aired from August 29, 2011, to October 23, 2016. From season six, which premiered on April 17, 2017, the casts of both shows were combined.

As of October 23, 2016, a total of 70 original episodes of Basketball Wives LA have aired.

== Series overview ==
Basketball Wives LA episodes
Season	Episodes		Originally released		Average Viewers (millions)
Season	Episodes		First released	Last released	Average Viewers (millions)
1	14		August 29, 2011	November 28, 2011	1.70
2	16		September 10, 2012	December 17, 2012	1.75
3	11		February 17, 2014	April 28, 2014	2.06
4	13		July 12, 2015	October 11, 2015	1.43
5	16		July 17, 2016	October 23, 2016	1.37
6	17		April 17, 2017	August 14, 2017	TBA
7	17		May 14, 2018	September 16, 2018	TBA
8	18		June 19, 2019	October 16, 2019	TBA
9	7		February 9, 2021	March 23, 2021	TBA
10	26	13	May 16, 2022	August 1, 2022	TBA
10	26	13	February 13, 2023	May 8, 2023	TBA
11	26	13	October 9, 2023	January 15, 2024	TBA
11	26	13	July 1, 2024	September 23, 2024	TBA
12	TBA		May 5, 2025	TBA	TBA

== Episodes ==
=== Season 1 (2011) ===
No. overall	No. in season	Title	Original release date	U.S. viewers (millions)
1	1	"Series Premiere"	August 29, 2011	1.81
2	2	"Episode 2"	September 5, 2011	1.70
3	3	"Episode 3"	September 12, 2011	1.31
4	4	"Episode 4"	September 19, 2011	1.47
5	5	"Episode 5"	September 26, 2011	1.72
6	6	"Episode 6"	October 3, 2011	1.56
7	7	"Episode 7"	October 10, 2011	1.16
8	8	"Episode 8"	October 17, 2011	1.29
9	9	"Episode 9"	October 24, 2011	1.73
10	10	"Episode 10"	October 31, 2011	1.29
11	11	"Episode 11"	November 7, 2011	1.99
12	12	"Season Finale"	November 14, 2011	2.18
13	13	"Reunion: Part 1"	November 21, 2011	2.26
14	14	"Reunion: Part 2"	November 28, 2011	2.32

=== Season 2 (2012) ===
No. overall	No. in season	Title	Original release date	U.S. viewers (millions)
15	1	"Season Premiere"	September 10, 2012	1.82
16	2	"Episode 2"	September 17, 2012	1.45
17	3	"Episode 3"	September 24, 2012	1.53
18	4	"Episode 4"	October 1, 2012	1.29
19	5	"Episode 5"	October 8, 2012	1.20
20	6	"Episode 6"	October 15, 2012	1.71
21	7	"Episode 7"	October 22, 2012	1.56
22	8	"Episode 8"	October 29, 2012	2.10
23	9	"Episode 9"	November 5, 2012	1.84
24	10	"Episode 10"	November 12, 2012	2.02
25	11	"Episode 11"	November 19, 2012	1.83
26	12	"Episode 12"	November 26, 2012	1.93
27	13	"Episode 13"	December 3, 2012	1.86
28	14	"Season Finale"	December 10, 2012	1.77
29	15	"Reunion: Part 1"	December 10, 2012	2.20
30	16	"Reunion: Part 2"	December 17, 2012	1.89

=== Season 3 (2014) ===
No. overall	No. in season	Title	Original release date	U.S. viewers (millions)
31	1	"Season Premiere"	February 17, 2014	1.95
32	2	"Episode 2"	February 24, 2014	1.88
33	3	"Episode 3"	March 3, 2014	1.90
34	4	"Episode 4"	March 10, 2014	1.66
35	5	"Episode 5"	March 17, 2014	1.87
36	6	"Episode 6"	March 24, 2014	2.37
37	7	"Episode 7"	March 31, 2014	2.13
38	8	"Episode 8"	April 7, 2014	2.29
39	9	"Episode 9"	April 14, 2014	2.16
40	10	"Season Finale"	April 21, 2014	2.20
41	11	"The Reunion"	April 28, 2014	2.21

=== Season 4 (2015) ===
No. overall	No. in season	Title	Original release date	U.S. viewers (millions)
42	1	"Season Premiere"	July 12, 2015	1.90
43	2	"Episode 2"	July 19, 2015	1.11
44	3	"Episode 3"	July 26, 2015	1.23
45	4	"Episode 4"	August 2, 2015	1.46
46	5	"Episode 5"	August 9, 2015	1.36
47	6	"Episode 6"	August 16, 2015	1.24
48	7	"Episode 7"	August 23, 2015	1.43
49	8	"Episode 8"	August 30, 2015	1.46
50	9	"Episode 9"	September 13, 2015	1.34
51	10	"Episode 10"	September 20, 2015	1.31
52	11	"Episode 11"	September 27, 2015	1.46
53	12	"Season Finale"	October 4, 2015	1.49
54	13	"The Reunion"	October 11, 2015	1.75

=== Season 5 (2016) ===
No. overall	No. in season	Title	Original release date	U.S. viewers (millions)
55	1	"Season Premiere"	July 17, 2016	1.58
56	2	"Episode 2"	July 24, 2016	0.92
57	3	"Episode 3"	July 24, 2016	1.17
58	4	"Episode 4"	July 31, 2016	1.11
59	5	"Episode 5"	August 7, 2016	1.13
60	6	"Episode 6"	August 14, 2016	1.26
61	7	"Episode 7"	August 21, 2016	1.18
62	8	"Episode 8"	August 28, 2016	1.16
63	9	"Episode 9"	September 11, 2016	1.52
64	10	"Episode 10"	September 18, 2016	1.46
65	11	"Episode 11"	September 25, 2016	1.09
66	12	"Episode 12"	September 25, 2016	1.45
67	13	"Episode 13"	October 2, 2016	1.68
68	14	"Episode 14"	October 9, 2016	1.61
69	15	"Season Finale"	October 16, 2016	1.82
70	16	"The Reunion"	October 23, 2016	1.78

=== Season 6 (2017) ===
No. overall	No. in season	Title	Original release date	U.S. viewers (millions)
62	1	"Season Premiere"	April 17, 2017	2.61
63	2	"Episode 2"	April 24, 2017	2.07
64	3	"Episode 3"	May 1, 2017	2.01
65	4	"Episode 4"	May 7, 2017	0.65
66	5	"Episode 5"	May 8, 2017	1.89
67	6	"Episode 6"	May 15, 2017	1.91
68	7	"Episode 7"	May 22, 2017	1.98
69	8	"Episode 8"	June 5, 2017	2.09
70	9	"Episode 9"	June 12, 2017	1.81
71	10	"Episode 10"	June 19, 2017	2.06
72	11	"Episode 11"	June 26, 2017	1.95
73	12	"Episode 12"	July 10, 2017	2.26
74	13	"Episode 13"	July 17, 2017	2.19
75	14	"Episode 14"	July 24, 2017	2.05
76	15	"Episode 15"	July 31, 2017	1.93
77	16	"Season Finale"	August 7, 2017	2.18
78	17	"The Reunion"	August 14, 2017	2.18

=== Season 7 (2018) ===
No. overall	No. in season	Title	Original release date	U.S. viewers (millions)
79	1	"Season Premiere"	May 14, 2018	1.87
80	2	"Episode 2"	May 21, 2018	1.71
81	3	"Episode 3"	May 28, 2018	1.59
82	4	"Episode 4"	June 4, 2018	1.82
83	5	"Episode 5"	June 11, 2018	1.96
84	6	"Episode 6"	June 25, 2018	1.89
85	7	"Episode 7"	July 2, 2018	1.86
86	8	"Episode 8"	July 8, 2018	1.06
87	9	"Episode 9"	July 16, 2018	1.67
88	10	"Episode 10"	July 30, 2018	1.59
89	11	"Episode 11"	August 5, 2018	0.94
90	12	"Episode 12"	August 12, 2018	0.90
91	13	"Episode 13"	August 19, 2018	0.92
92	14	"Episode 14"	August 26, 2018	1.07
93	15	"Episode 15"	September 2, 2018	0.86
94	16	"Season Finale"	September 9, 2018	1.09
95	17	"The Reunion"	September 16, 2018	1.17

=== Season 8 (2019) ===
No. overall	No. in season	Title	Original release date	U.S. viewers (millions)
96	1	"Season Premiere"	June 19, 2019	0.97
97	2	"Episode 2"	June 26, 2019	0.99
98	3	"Episode 3"	July 3, 2019	0.70
99	4	"Episode 4"	July 10, 2019	0.93
100	5	"Episode 5"	July 17, 2019	1.06
101	6	"Episode 6"	July 24, 2019	1.04
102	7	"Episode 7"	July 31, 2019	0.99
103	8	"Episode 8"	August 7, 2019	1.09
104	9	"Episode 9"	August 14, 2019	1.23
105	10	"Episode 10"	August 21, 2019	1.31
106	11	"Episode 11"	August 28, 2019	1.18
107	12	"Episode 12"	September 4, 2019	1.07
108	13	"Episode 13"	September 11, 2019	1.07
109	14	"Episode 14"	September 18, 2019	1.23
110	15	"Episode 15"	September 25, 2019	1.13
111	16	"Season Finale"	October 2, 2019	1.23
112	17	"Reunion – Part 1"	October 9, 2019	1.34
113	18	"Reunion – Part 2"	October 16, 2019	1.21

=== Season 9 (2021) ===
No. overall	No. in season	Title	Original release date	U.S. viewers (millions)
114	1	"Season Premiere"	February 9, 2021	0.54
115	2	"Episode 2"	February 16, 2021	0.40
116	3	"Episode 3"	February 23, 2021	0.54
117	4	"Episode 4"	March 2, 2021	0.48
118	5	"Episode 5"	March 9, 2021	0.49
119	6	"Episode 6"	March 16, 2021	0.46
120	7	"Season Finale"	March 23, 2021	0.46

=== Season 10 (2022–23) ===
No. overall	No. in season	Title	Original release date	U.S. viewers (millions)
Part 1
121	1	"Season Premiere"	May 16, 2022	0.52
122	2	"Episode 2"	May 23, 2022	0.42
123	3	"Episode 3"	May 30, 2022	0.43
124	4	"Episode 4"	June 6, 2022	0.41
125	5	"Episode 5"	June 13, 2022	0.55
126	6	"Episode 6"	June 20, 2022	0.46
127	7	"Episode 7"	June 27, 2022	0.48
128	8	"Episode 8"	July 4, 2022	0.42
129	9	"Episode 9"	July 11, 2022	0.43
130	10	"Episode 10"	July 11, 2022	0.48
131	11	"Episode 11"	July 18, 2022	0.51
132	12	"Episode 12"	July 25, 2022	0.41
133	13	"Episode 13"	August 1, 2022	0.59
Part 2
134	14	"Episode 14"	February 13, 2023	0.51
135	15	"Episode 15"	February 20, 2023	0.44
136	16	"Episode 16"	February 27, 2023	0.37
137	17	"Episode 17"	March 6, 2023	0.32
138	18	"Episode 18"	March 13, 2023	0.42
139	19	"Episode 19"	March 20, 2023	0.33
140	20	"Episode 20"	March 27, 2023	0.40
141	21	"Episode 21"	April 3, 2023	0.42
142	22	"Episode 22"	April 10, 2023	0.38
143	23	"Episode 23"	April 17, 2023	0.32
144	24	"Episode 24"	April 24, 2023	0.34
145	25	"Season Finale"	May 1, 2023	0.37
146	26	"The Reunion"	May 8, 2023	0.35

=== Season 11 (2023–24) ===
No. overall	No. in season	Title	Original release date	U.S. viewers (millions)
Part 1
147	1	"Back in the Building!"	October 9, 2023	0.45
148	2	"Homewreckers"	October 16, 2023	0.33
149	3	"Ice Queens"	October 23, 2023	0.44
150	4	"Who Are You, Where Did You Come From?"	October 30, 2023	0.40
151	5	"Cooking with Fire"	November 6, 2023	0.41
152	6	"Turning Up the Heat"	November 13, 2023	0.33
153	7	"The Double Standard"	November 20, 2023	0.23
154	8	"Not So Magic Mike"	November 27, 2023	0.28
155	9	"Wrong Impressions"	December 4, 2023	0.30
156	10	"Pain to Purpose"	December 11, 2023	0.28
157	11	"Shop Til You Pop"	December 18, 2023	0.28
158	12	"Love Lost & Love Found"	January 8, 2024	0.33
159	13	"The Reunion"	January 15, 2024	0.35
Part 2
160	14	"A Liar's Gonna Lie"	July 1, 2024	0.21
161	15	"Secrets, Lies and Private Eyes"	July 8, 2024	0.26
162	16	"Uninvited Guests, Unintended Consequences"	July 15, 2024	0.29
163	17	"Don't Call Me Sweetie"	July 22, 2024	0.27
164	18	"I'm a Sh*t Finisher"	July 29, 2024	0.30
165	19	"This Is Beneath Me!"	August 5, 2024	0.31
166	20	"She's Not Worth Your Taco"	August 12, 2024	0.34
167	21	"Once a Cheater, Always a Cheater"	August 19, 2024	0.34
168	22	"Getting Messy in Mexico"	August 26, 2024	0.38
169	23	"Shots Poured, Shots Fired"	September 2, 2024	0.38
170	24	"You Can't Even Spell Wife"	September 9, 2024	0.38
171	25	"Sisterhood of the Traveling Drama"	September 16, 2024	0.32
172	26	"The Reunion: Hot Mics and Spicy Drama"	September 23, 2024	0.38

=== Season 12 (2025) ===
No. overall	No. in season	Title	Original release date	U.S. viewers (millions)
Part 1
173	1	"It's Giving Foe"	May 5, 2025	0.30
174	2	"Win, Lose, or Brawl"	May 12, 2025	TBD
175	3	"Bad Ty/Ming"	May 19, 2025	TBD
176	4	"Friends and Foes Do Vegas"	May 26, 2025	TBD
177	5	"Magic, Mess, & Matrimony"	June 2, 2025	TBD
