= Malaysia Pargo =

American television personality (born 1980)

- Born: Laquisha Shanek Gilbert; August 12, 1980 (age 46); Compton, California, U.S.
- Occupations: Television personality; actress; entrepreneur
- Years active: 2003–present
- Known for: Basketball Wives
- Spouse: Jannero Pargo (m. 2006; div. 2014)
- Children: 3

Malaysia Pargo (born August 12, 1980) is an American television personality, actress, and entrepreneur. She is best known for her long-running role as a main cast member on VH1's reality television franchise Basketball Wives LA and its parent series Basketball Wives, appearing regularly from 2011 to 2023.

== Career ==
Pargo began her career in entertainment as a model and video vixen, appearing in several high-profile hip hop music videos in the early 2000s. Among her most notable appearances were Ludacris's "Splash Waterfalls" and Kanye West's "Jesus Walks" in 2004. She later starred in the 2014 music video for "Nothing" by rapper and pastor Ma$e, which received media attention ahead of its premiere on Revolt TV.

Pargo rose to mainstream prominence as a reality television personality after joining the cast of Basketball Wives LA when the series premiered in 2011. She remained a main cast member for multiple seasons and later continued her role on the flagship series Basketball Wives, appearing regularly from 2017 through 2023. In 2024, she joined the main cast of the WE tv reality series Bold & Bougie, produced by Carlos King, where she showcased her personal life and business ventures.

In addition to television, Pargo has pursued multiple entrepreneurial ventures in fashion, lifestyle, and beauty. In 2011, she launched Three Beats Custom Children's Jewelry, a jewelry line designed specifically for children, in partnership with jeweler Jason Arasheben, with a portion of proceeds benefiting the Watts/Willowbrook Boys & Girls Club in Los Angeles. In 2015, she debuted Malaysia Pargo by Hedgecock Creed, a luxury bedding collection combining fashion-forward design with affordable pricing, which was launched at an event in Beverly Hills, California and sold through the Hedgecock Creed brand. In 2020, she collaborated with skincare brand Urban Skin Rx on a limited-edition product, the Malaysia x Urban Skin Rx Skin Quench Oxygen Gel Mask.

== Personal life ==
Pargo married former NBA player Jannero Pargo in 2006, after dating for four years. The couple legally separated on December 27, 2012, and Pargo filed for divorce in May 2014 in Los Angeles County Superior Court, citing irreconcilable differences. They have three children: a son, Jannero Jr. (born 2006), and twins, Jayla and Jayden (born 2011). In her divorce filing, Pargo requested sole legal and physical custody of the children, visitation rights for Jannero Pargo, spousal support, and payment of legal fees.

On December 27, 2013, Pargo's brother, Dontae Hayes, was fatally shot by police in Riverside, California, during an attempted arrest related to a warrant for failure to appear in traffic court. Pargo and her family disputed police statements that Hayes was armed and subsequently filed a wrongful death lawsuit against the Riverside Police Department. The incident and its emotional impact on Pargo were later discussed on the reality television series Basketball Wives, where she described experiencing fear during encounters with law enforcement following her brother's death.

In 2024, Pargo announced that she was dating American football player Kenny Clark, describing the relationship as supportive and noting that they had previously dated before reconnecting.

In March 2025, Pargo's mother passed away.

== Filmography ==
=== Film ===
Year	Title	Role	Notes
2023	Behind the Veil 2	Coco	Feature film debut
2026	Have You Seen Her	Carmel	

=== Television ===
Year	Title	Role	Notes
2011–2016	Basketball Wives LA	Self	Regular cast member (several seasons)
2012	Big Morning Buzz Live	Self	Guest appearances
2013	Datzhott	Self	Guest/appearance (1 episode)
2014	AbSIRd	Self — Guest	Guest appearance (1 episode)
2014	The Arsenio Hall Show	Self — Guest	Guest appearance (1 episode)
2015	Noches con Platanito	Self — Guest	Guest appearance (1 episode)
2015	VH1 Big in 2015 (with Entertainment Weekly)	Self	TV special appearance
2016	4th Annual Gospel Goes to Hollywood Awards	Self	TV special appearance
2016	Home & Family	Self	Guest appearance (1 episode)
2016	The Eric Andre Show	Self	Guest appearance (1 episode)
2017–2023	Basketball Wives	Self	Regular cast member (several seasons)
2019	Hip Hop Squares	Self — Contestant	Panelist/contestant (1 episode)
2020	Love & Hip Hop: Atlanta	Self	Guest appearances (2 episodes)
2023–2024	Bold & Bougie	Self	We TV series; main cast member
