= Basketball Wives season 6 =

Basketball Wives
- Season 6
- Cover used by ITunes Store
- Starring: Jackie Christie; Malaysia Pargo; Evelyn Lozada; Tami Roman; Shaunie O'Neal

Release
- Original network: VH1
- Original release: April 17 – August 14, 2017

Season chronology
- ← Previous; Season 5 Next → Season 7

The sixth season of the reality television series Basketball Wives aired on VH1 from April 17, 2017 until August 14, 2017. The season was primarily filmed in Los Angeles, California. It was executively produced by Nick Emmerson, Alex Demyanenko, Shaunie O'Neal, Jill Holmes, Tom Huffman, and Sean Rankine.

The show chronicles the lives of a group of women who are the wives and girlfriends, or have been romantically linked to, professional basketball players in the National Basketball Association, though the title of the series does not make this differentiation, solely referring to the women as "wives".

== Production ==
Basketball Wives debuted on April 11, 2010, with thirty-minute episodes. The second season premiered on December 12, 2010, with expanded sixty-minute episodes and featured new cast member Tami Roman. Season 3 made its debut on May 30, 2011, with new cast member Meeka Claxton. The fourth season premiered on February 20, 2012, with two new cast members, Kenya Bell and Kesha Nichols and the departure of Claxton. The fifth season premiered on August 19, 2013, with Tasha Marbury joining the cast. According to a tweet from Tami Roman, the show has been quietly though officially cancelled.

On March 27, 2017, VH1 announced that the series would be returning after nearly four years off-air on April 17, with Evelyn Lozada, Shaunie O'Neal, Tami Roman, Jackie Christie and Malaysia Pargo returning to the franchise. Brandi Maxiell, Elena Ahanzadeh, Saniy'yah Samaa, Keonna Green, Bonnie-Jill Laflin, Aja, Christen and Melissa Metoyer joined the series as recurring cast members. Filming for the season began in November 2016.

== Cast ==
=== Main cast ===
- Jackie Christie: Wife of Doug Christie
- Malaysia Pargo: Ex-Wife of Jannero Pargo
- Evelyn Lozada: Ex-Fiancée of Carl Crawford
- Tami Roman: Ex-Wife of Kenny Anderson
- Shaunie O'Neal: Ex-Wife of Shaquille O'Neal

=== Recurring cast ===
- Brandi Maxiell: Wife of Jason Maxiell
- Saniy'yah Samaa: Stylist
- Cristen Metoyer: Girlfriend of Joe Crawford
- Aja Metoyer: Cristen's sister
- Elena Ahanzadeh
- Keonna Green: Ex-Girlfriend of Nick Young
- Bonnie-Jill Laflin: Girlfriend of Kareem Rush
- Jennifer Williams: Ex-Wife of Eric Williams

== Episodes ==
No. overall	No. in season	Title	Original release date	U.S. viewers (millions)
62	1	"Season Premiere"	April 17, 2017	2.61
Evelyn makes the move to Los Angeles, and reunites with her best friend, Shaunie. Tensions rise among Evelyn, Tami and Jackie at Shaunie's birthday party. Jackie Christie and Malaysia Pargo are added to the opening credits replacing departed cast members Suzie Ketcham and Tasha Marbury. This episode marks the first appearance of Keonna Green. Although credited, Malaysia does not appear.
63	2	"Episode 2"	April 24, 2017	2.07
Evelyn and Jackie put their differences aside. Tami digs up new dirt on Evelyn to prove she has not changed. This episode marks the first appearance of Bonnie-Jill Laflin and Elena Ahanzadeh. Although credited, Malaysia does not appear.
64	3	"Episode 3"	May 1, 2017	2.01
Jackie throws a party to celebrate becoming a grandmother. Shaunie supports Evelyn as she begins her IVF treatment. Tami hosts a book-signing but a dark cloud rains on her parade when Jackie shows up. This episode marks the first appearance of Aja Metoyer and Cristen Metoyer as well as the final appearance of Elena. Although credited, Malaysia does not appear.
65	4	"Episode 4"	May 7, 2017	0.65
Shaunie tries to broker a peace treaty between Tami and Evelyn. Jackie hosts a wine safari to bring her friends together. Malaysia Pargo returns. This episode marks the return of Malaysia Pargo.
66	5	"Episode 5"	May 8, 2017	1.89
Shaunie, Tami and Evelyn meet with Jackie. Brandi Maxiell returns to Los Angeles. Evelyn celebrates exciting news about her IVF treatment. This episode marks the return of Brandi Maxiell and marks the first appearance of Saniy'yah Samaa.
67	6	"Episode 6"	May 15, 2017	1.91
The women travel to Palm Springs for a celebratory weekend. Evelyn surprises Cristen. Malaysia invites a friend to dinner which causes tension among everyone.
68	7	"Episode 7"	May 22, 2017	1.98
Shaunie, Tami and Evelyn regroup after being ambushed by Brandi. Jackie throws a party to celebrate sexuality. Cristen's sister arrives.
69	8	"Episode 8"	June 5, 2017	2.09
Jackie throws a "love your body" party. Malaysia feels that Shaunie, Tami and Evelyn snubbed her. Cristen divides her friendship with Jackie. This episode marks the final appearance of Aja.
70	9	"Episode 9"	June 12, 2017	1.81
Tami interviews possible surrogates. Saniy'yah throws a garden party. Malaysia confronts Shaunie, Tami and Evelyn. Jackie and BJ have words. This episode marks the first appearance of Hazel Renee as well as the final appearance of Keonna.
71	10	"Episode 10"	June 19, 2017	2.06
Malaysia spends time with her children. Jackie learns that Evelyn feels displeased, and things come to a head at a party.
72	11	"Episode 11"	June 26, 2017	1.95
Tami suggests that the ladies take a trip to New York City; Evelyn reminisces in the Bronx with Shaunie. Jackie pushes Evelyn to her breaking point. Although credited, Malaysia does not appear.
73	12	"Episode 12"	July 10, 2017	2.26
The group fractures following the altercation with Evelyn and Jackie. Tami has to stop managing Jazz when she gets signed to a record label. Although credited, Malaysia does not appear.
74	13	"Episode 13"	July 17, 2017	2.19
Jackie tries to broker a truce between Saniy'yah and Hazel. Jen Williams returns to the group. Evelyn and Jen speak to each other for the first time in seven years. This episode marks the return of Jennifer Williams.
75	14	"Episode 14"	July 24, 2017	2.05
Tami breaks the news to Reggie. Malaysia feels divided from the group. Evelyn and Jackie see each other for the first time since Shaunie's event.
76	15	"Episode 15"	July 31, 2017	1.93
Shaunie invites the women to Miami. Kijafa Vick and Jeniva Samuel invite the women on a yacht. Jackie confronts Shaunie about an interview.
77	16	"Season Finale"	August 7, 2017	2.18
Evelyn receives a copy of Ta'kari's manuscript. Jackie and Evelyn sit face-to-face. Shaunie and Jackie's friendship is tested.
78	17	"The Reunion"	August 14, 2017	2.18
The women gather for the first time after the Miami trip. Jackie and Evelyn push their relationship to the limits. Cristen is confronted. This episode marks the final appearances of Saniy'yah, Cristen, and Bonnie Jill.
