= Baller Wives =

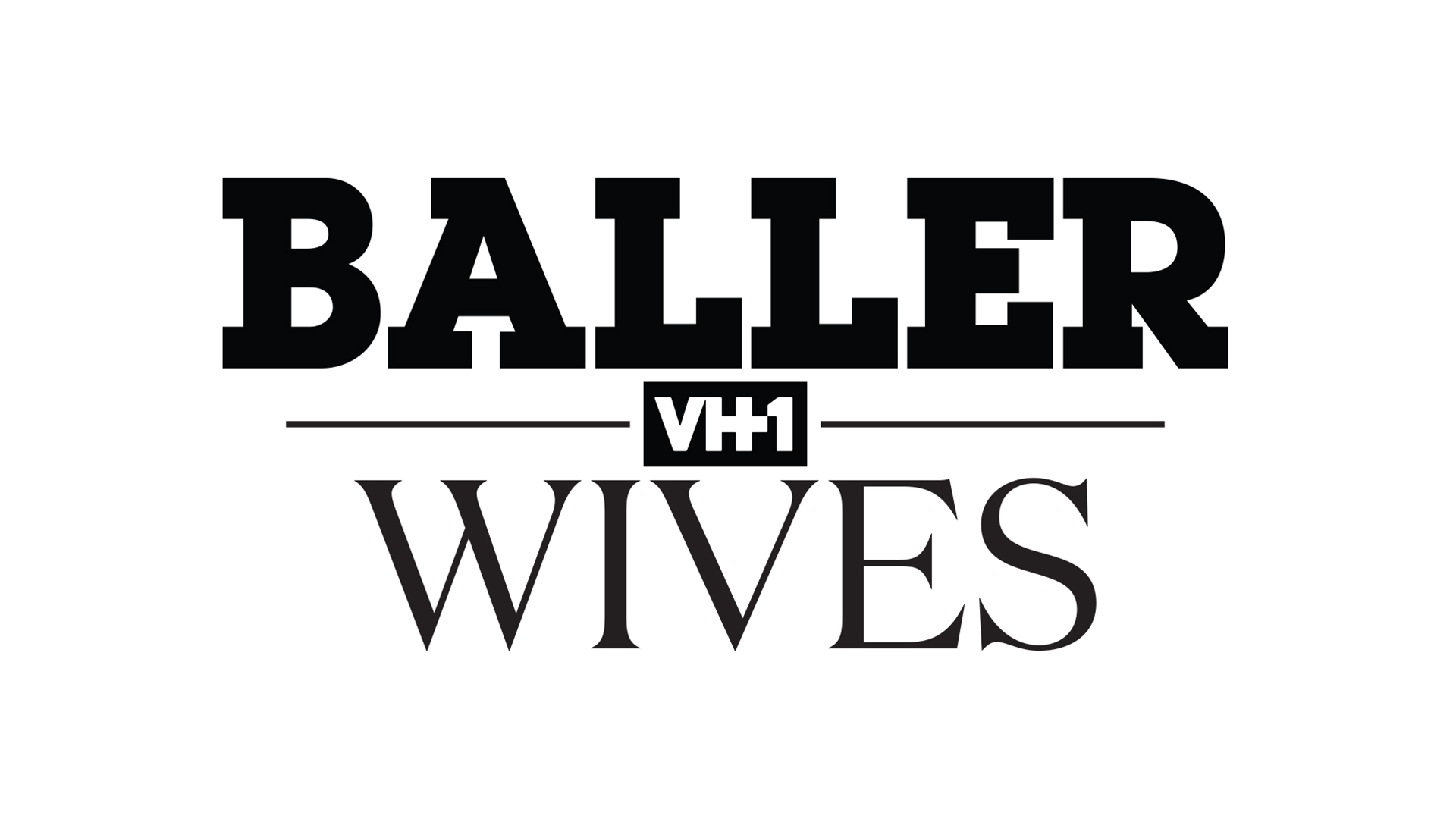
- Genre: Reality
- Starring: Kijafa and Michael Vick; Stacey and Chris Chambers; Jeniva and Asante Samuel; Aja and Channing Crowder; Kelly and Julius Jones; Miko and Brent Grimes
- Country of origin: United States
- No. of seasons: 1
- No. of episodes: 7

Production
- Executive producers: Michael Vick: Kijafa Vick; Pam Healey; Lisa Shannon; Chris Costine; John Paparazzo; Michelle Kongkasuwan; Dave Kuba; John H. Kelleher; Nina L. Diaz; Liz Fine; Fernando Mills; Paula Aranda
- Camera setup: Multiple
- Running time: 44 minutes
- Production company: Shed Media

Original release
- Network: VH1
- Release: August 14 – September 11, 2017

Related
- Basketball Wives

Baller Wives is an American reality television series that premiered August 14, 2017 on VH1. It chronicles the lives of a group of women who are the wives and girlfriends, or have been romantically linked to, professional football players in the National Football League, though the title of the series does not make this differentiation, solely referring to the women as "wives".

== Production ==
Baller Wives debuted on August 14, 2017 with Kijafa and Michael Vick, Stacey and Chris Chambers, Jeniva and Asante Samuel, Aja and Channing Crowder, Kelly and Julius Jones and Miko and Brent Grimes as Main Cast members. The series also included Crystal Marie and Emmaly Lugo as recurring cast members

== Cast ==
=== Main ===
- Kijafa and Michael Vick-Have been married since 2012 and have two beautiful daughters and a new baby on the way. Kijafa is the Queen Bee of the ladies and knows everyone's secrets. Since being the self-proclaimed "Queen Bee" she clashes with some of the ladies within the group.
- Stacey and Chris Chambers-Stacey and Chris Chambers, a retired wide receiver for Miami, are happily married and expecting their second child. Big believers on taking an unconventional approach, Stacey finds herself in a heated disagreement with Kijafa and has formed her own alliances within the circle.
- Miko and Brent Grimes- Miko, wife of Tampa Bay cornerback Brent Grimes, is restarting her career after recently being let go from her long-running sports radio show. She and Brent have a son together and have been married for seven years. With his training schedule, Miko has to deal with Brent's absence leading up to the new season.
- Jeniva and Asante Samuel-Jeniva finds her husband, two-time champion Asante Samuel, eager to start a new career as a boxer. With professional football behind him, Jeniva thought her years of worrying about Asante's safety were over until he decides to start a new career in a different sport.
- Aja and Channing Crowder-Played as a linebacker for Miami and is now a sports radio host. This couple finds themselves in the middle of the drama with Miko after she is fired from the radio station where Channing works.
- Kelly and Julius Jones-Have been married for eight years and have two sons together. A former Dallas running back, Julius is adamantly against his sons playing football, much to the boys' dismay.

=== Recurring ===
- Crystal Marie-Is best friends with Stacey and Miko and she confides in them daily. After a rough break up with her ex, Crystal is a young mother, newly single and eager to jump back into the dating world.
- Emmaly Lugo-Former video vixen. Emmaly is a single mother of two and co-parents one child with her famous ex-husband. She balances Miami life while going to school to be a pharmacist.

== Episodes ==
No.	Title	Original release date	U.S. viewers (millions)
1	"Episode 1"	August 14, 2017	1.63
2	"Episode 2"	August 21, 2017	1.36
3	"Episode 3"	August 28, 2017	1.26
4	"Episode 4"	September 4, 2017	1.11
5	"Episode 5"	September 11, 2017	1.29
6	"Episode 6"	September 11, 2017	1.09
