= Bonnie-Jill Laflin =

American model, television personality and sportscaster

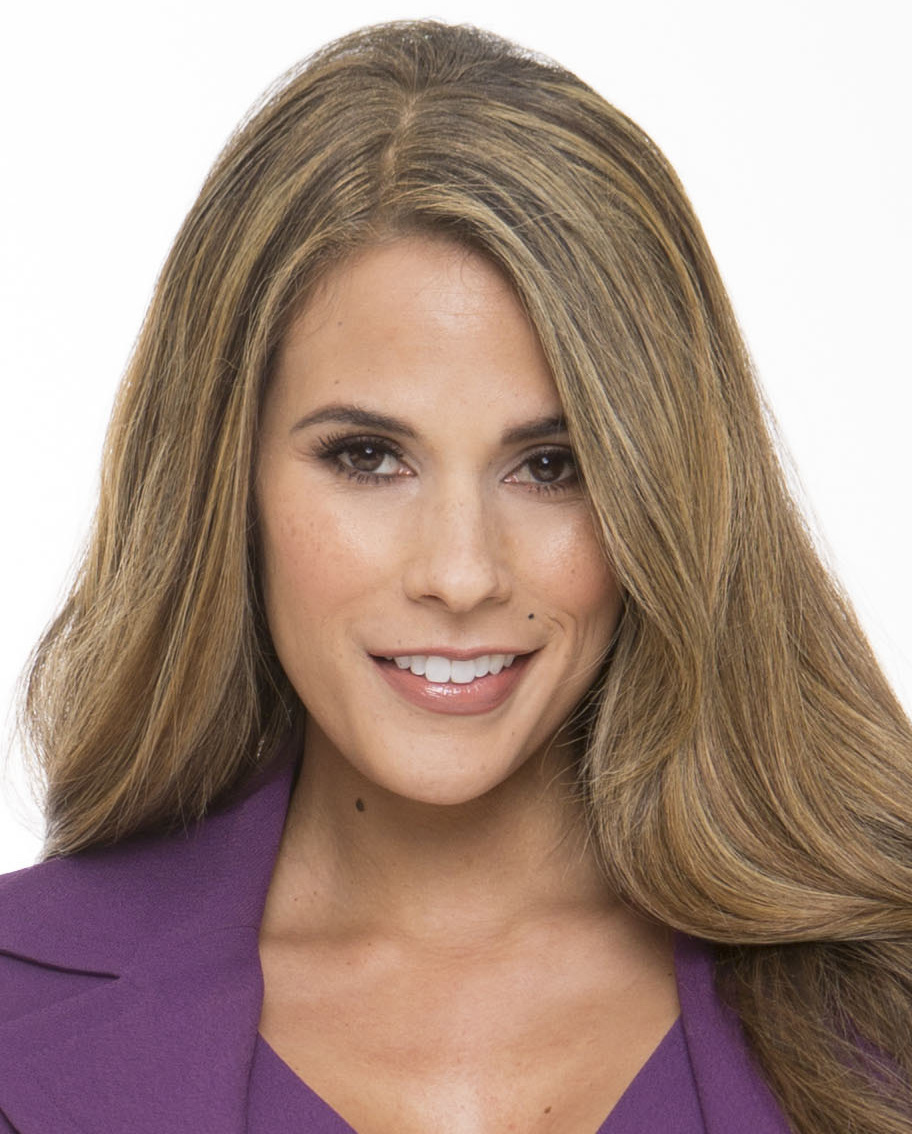
- Laflin in 2015
- Born: March 15, 1976 (age 50); San Francisco, California, U.S.
- Occupations: Actress, model, TV personality, radio personality
- Years active: 1996–present
- Known for: Basketball Wives, Los Angeles Lakers, Dallas Cowboys Cheerleaders, KNBR Sports Radio, Fox Sports, ESPN
- Website: bonnie-jill.com

Bonnie-Jill Laflin (born March 15, 1976) is an American actress, model, television personality and sportscaster. Laflin has also worked as an actress and most notably as a scout for the Los Angeles Lakers, making her the league's first female scout. She was also assistant general manager of the Lakers NBA Development League team.

== Biography ==
Laflin grew up in San Francisco, California, the daughter of a law enforcement officer and began modeling as a child with her mother. She started dancing at age 2 and studied with the San Francisco Ballet. She first gained public attention as a cheerleader with the Golden State Warriors of the NBA and is a former San Francisco 49ers and Dallas Cowboys Cheerleader in the National Football League, earning a Super Bowl ring with the 49ers.

Laflin's work as a cheerleader and model helped her into television with recurring roles on Baywatch in the 1998–1999 season and Ally McBeal in 2000. She then became a TV personality, hosting Spike TV's Hotlines and ESPN's United Rockcrawling & Off-Road Challenge Series. Laflin was also a correspondent for Prime 9 News with KCAL-TV in Los Angeles, California, (2003), and a correspondent for ESPN's Cold Pizza. Her accolades in the sports industry also include broadcasting jobs for CBS, Fox, BBC and NFL Network. She is the creator and host of a basketball TV show for China, Muho TV (spoken in English with Chinese subtitles).

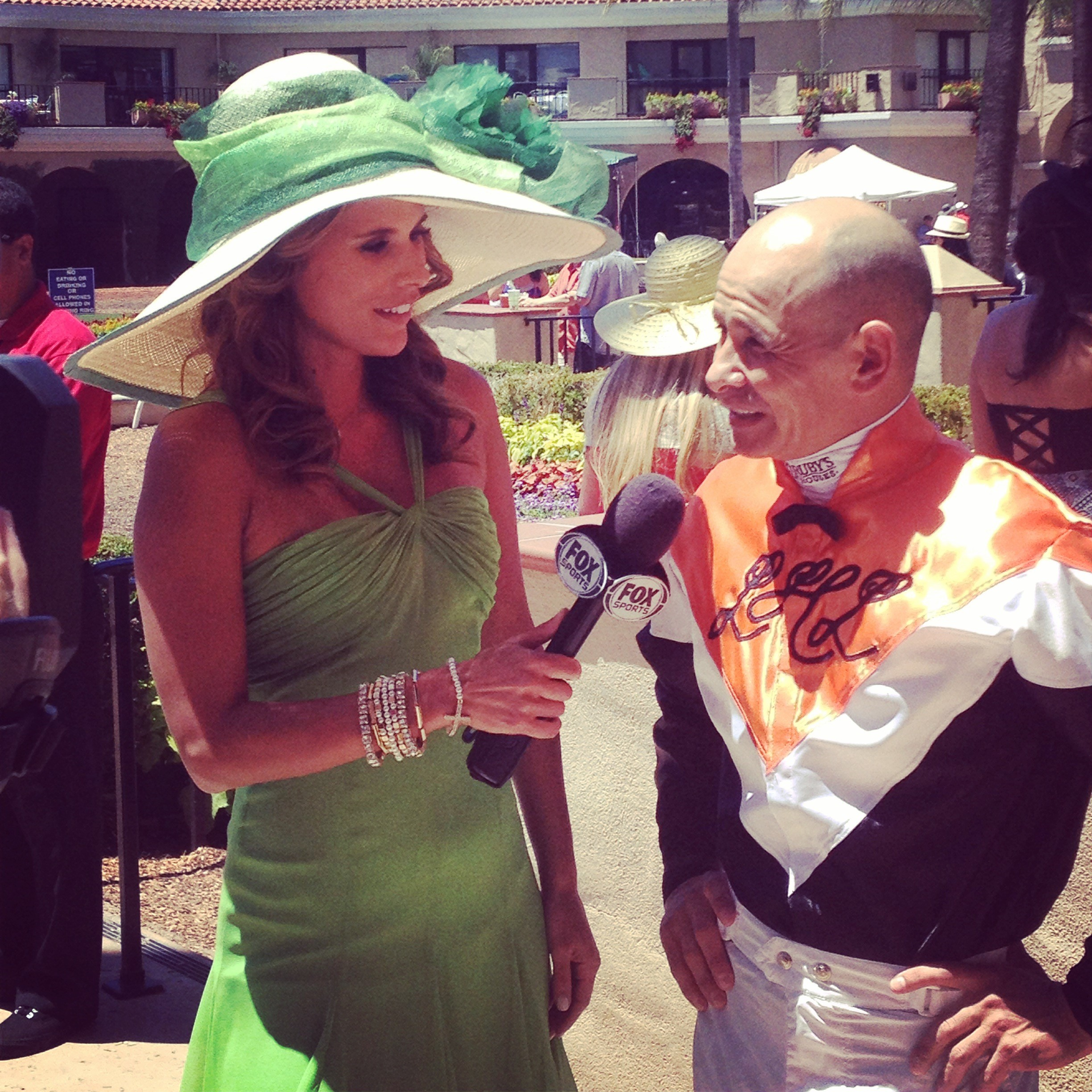
Laflin conducting an interview

Laflin played Dierks Bentley's love interest in CMT's 2005 Sexiest Video of the Year, "Come a Little Closer". In 2005, she appeared as one of the suitcase-holding models during the airing of the opening week of Deal or No Deal on NBC. Laflin was ranked #89 on the Maxim Hot 100 Women of 2005. In 2006, Laflin appeared nude in the DVD "Pro Football Cheerleaders Exposed." She has also worked as a model for Frederick's of Hollywood and Venus Swimwear, and her print campaigns include Coors Light, Bacardi, Wrangler, FedEx, McDonald's, Doritos, Carl's Jr and Nike. She also worked as an ambassador and host for Air Jordan. Laflin has been featured in several magazines including FHM, Maxim, GQ, Sports Illustrated, ESPN the Magazine, Women's Health, Fitness RX, Origin and New Beauty. She was named among the Top Hooters Girls as part of the restaurant chain's 25th anniversary in 2008. Laflin was a cast member on season 6 of VH1's Basketball Wives.

Laflin has worked with the Los Angeles Lakers as a professional basketball scout, making her the league's first female scout, and as one of the two assistant general managers of the Lakers' developmental team, the Los Angeles D-Fenders. She received 5 NBA Championship rings during her time with the Lakers. On March 7, 2012, she announced that she and Kareem Rush would pair up in a fantasy basketball sports radio program on SiriusXM named The Rush Hour. The show launched on October 23, 2012; the show was renewed for 2013. Laflin's other radio shows include Playboy Fantasy Football on Sirius/XM and University of Texas pre- and post-football game shows for ESPN Austin. Laflin has appeared on the ABC game show To Tell the Truth and was a guest on Larry King Now.

Laflin currently hosts Bonnie-Jill Laflin's The Weekly Pass on Afterbuzz TV, the first ever sports show on the network. Since September 2018 she is now a regular host on KNBR's Murph and Mac show. As of March 2019 she is concurrently also a television on air host and reporter for NBC Sports Bay Area.

In 2022 Bonnie-Jill joined both the Cowboy Channel. She served as an on-air host and reporter for Cowboy Channel and Cowgirl Channel and hosted Women's Western Sports Round Up.

May 2023 Laflin's podcast The Weekly Pass joined the Bleav Podcast Network and airs on Bleav and Bally Sports.

In October 2023, Audacy, Inc. announced Laflin would be taking over afternoon drive on its classic hits station 98.7 The Spot in Dallas.

Since August 2023, Laflin has served as the post fight in ring interviewer for Lights Out Xtreme Fighting, which is broadcast on Fubo and various cable and satellite carriers.

== Author ==
In the spring of 2024, Laflin released her first published book titled "In A League Of Her Own"; an exploration into the lives of female pioneers in the world of sports and sports entertainment. It was published by Rowman & Littlefield.

Women interviewed in her book include: Nadia Comaneci, Billie Jean King, Nancy Lieberman, Jayne Kennedy, Martha Josey, Jackie Joyner-Kersee, Mary Lou Retton, Amy Trask, Julie Krone, Manon Rhéaume, Laila Ali, Trish Stratus, Renel Brooks-Moon, Danica Patrick, Melissa Stockwell, Bilqis Abdul-Qaadir, Jeanie Buss, Rachel Balkovec, Rachel Luba, Katie Sowers

== Charity work ==
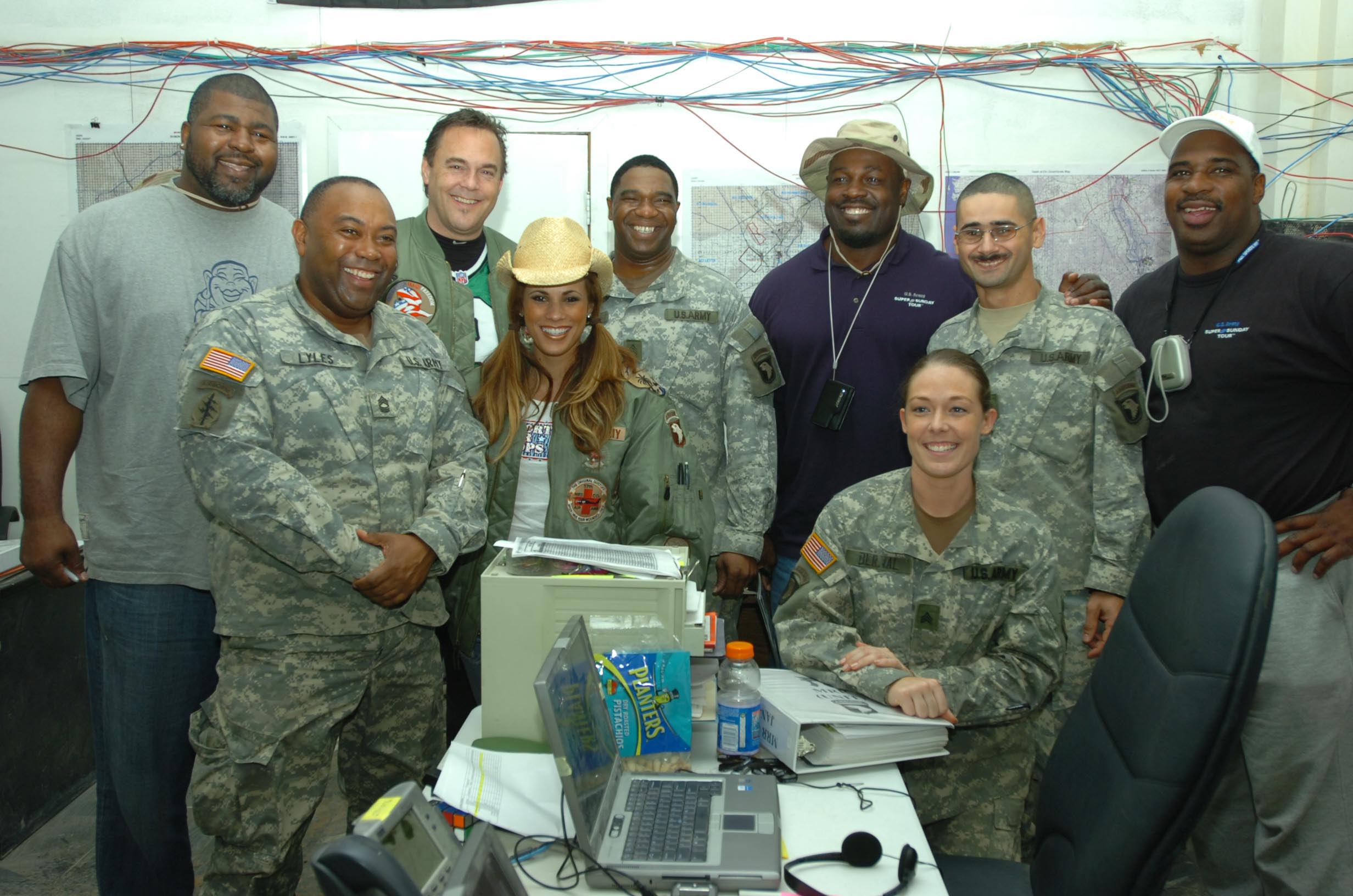
Laflin with professional football players during a visit to FOB Speicher in Tikrit, Iraq, in 2006

In 2010, Laflin founded the charity Hounds and Heroes, a 501(c)(3) nonprofit dedicated to raising funds for military veterans, first responders and animals. She has traveled all over the world on 18 United Service Organizations and Goodwill Tours, including 8 to Iraq and Afghanistan, supporting the United States Armed Forces.

== Clothing line ==
Laflin has a clothing line, DoublePlay Sportswear, a women's sports apparel company.

== Personal life ==
Laflin started her own Rodeo Flag team called The Liberty Bells that features female cowgirls who perform at rodeos, sporting events and parades.

Laflin has rescued many domestic and farm animals that live on her parents' ranch. She is a vegetarian and has been featured on PETA posters.

She is a competitive barrel racer.
