= Basketball Wives LA =

American reality TV series

- Genre: Reality
- Created by: Tom Huffman
- Starring: Kimsha Artest; Jackie Christie; Gloria Govan; Laura Govan; Draya Michele; Malaysia Pargo; Imani Showalter; Tanya Williams; Brooke Bailey; Sundy Carter; Brandi Maxiell; Brittish Williams; Mehgan James; Shaunie O'Neal; Angel Brinks; LaTosha Duffey; Angel Love; Tami Roman; Jac'Eil Duckworth; Brittany Renner; Vanessa Rider; Chantel Christie-Jeffries; Ming Lee; Ty Young
- Country of origin: United States
- Original language: English
- No. of seasons: 5
- No. of episodes: 70 (list of episodes)

Production
- Executive producers: Shaunie O'Neal; Steven Weinstock; Glenda Hersh; Lauren Eskelin; Lorraine Haughton-Lawson; Julie "Bob" Lombardi; Paula Arnada; Jennifer Aguirre; Kenny Loeliger-Myers; Mark Seliga; Alissa Horowitz; Yessica Garcia; Katie Sole
- Camera setup: Multiple
- Running time: 42 to 44 minutes
- Production companies: Shed Media; Truly Original (2019–present); MTV Entertainment Studios (2022–2023); VH1 (2024–present)

Original release
- Network: VH1
- Release: August 29, 2011 – present

Related
- Basketball Wives

Basketball Wives LA is an American reality television series on VH1. It chronicles the everyday lives of women romantically linked to men in the professional basketball industry, based in Los Angeles, California. Developed as the second installment of the Basketball Wives franchise, the series premiered on August 29, 2011; and ran for five seasons until October 23, 2016.

On March 27, 2017, VH1 announced that Basketball Wives would be revived for a sixth season, with its setting relocated to Los Angeles, effectively combining the casts of both the original series and its spinoff. Subsequent seasons have also featured this hybrid cast.

== Overview and casting ==
=== Seasons 1–2 ===
On June 20, 2011, VH1 announced that they had expanded the franchise to Los Angeles. The announced cast for Basketball Wives LA included Kimsha Artest, wife of Ron Artest, Gloria Govan and her sister Laura Govan, Jackie Christie, wife of Doug Christie, and Imani Showalter, ex-fiancée of Stephen Jackson. Malaysia Pargo, wife of Jannero Pargo, and Draya Michele, a model and aspiring actress with a history of dating basketball players, were announced as cast members a month later. Tanya Williams, wife of Jayson Williams, would also appear, however, was quickly phased out of the show along with Kimsha Artest, who admittedly stopped showing up for filming because of the "shenanigans and drama". The series premiered on August 29, 2011, to 1.81 million viewers.

The show was renewed for a second season, which premiered on September 10, 2012, attracting 1.82 million viewers. Imani Showalter quit the show and moved back to New York, and was replaced by Brooke Bailey, girlfriend of Vernon Macklin. Adiz "Bambi" Benson, Malaysia's friend and an aspiring rapper, appeared in a supporting role.

=== Season 3 ===
Following the cancellation of the original Basketball Wives, executive producer Shaunie O'Neal announced that the cast of Basketball Wives LA would be retooled for season three. Filming began in August 2013, with new members British Williams, fiancée of Lorenzo Gordon, Brandi Maxiell, wife of Jason Maxiell, and Sundy Carter, mother of Larry Hughes's daughter. Gloria and Laura Govan confirmed their exit, as did Brooke Bailey. The third-season premiere acquired 1.95 million viewers, the show's highest-rated at the time. This season is also the first and only of the series to reach over 2 million viewers for six consecutive weeks.

=== Seasons 4–5 ===
Season four began production in November 2014 and wrapped in April 2015. The season premiered on July 12, 2015, to 1.90 million viewers, moving from Monday to Sunday nights. Shaunie O'Neal and Bad Girls Club's Mehgan James joined the cast, with Tyreke Evans's ex-girlfriend Angel Brinks, Eddy Curry's wife Patrice Curry, and Tami Roman appearing in supporting roles.

On September 23, 2015, the show was renewed for a fifth season. Filming began in January 2016 and wrapped in June, with Draya Michele and Mehgan James departing from the show. They were replaced by Tami Roman and Angel Brinks, who were promoted to the main cast, and new cast members LaTosha Duffey, fiancée of Iman Shokuohizadeh, and Angel Love, girlfriend of DeJuan Blair. It premiered on July 17, 2016, to 1.58 million viewers and a 0.5 in the adults 18–49 rating demographic, making it the lowest rated premiere for the series. It was followed by the spin-off, Shaunie's Home Court, starring Shaunie O'Neal, which aired on VH1 for two seasons.

=== Season 6 ===
On March 27, 2017, VH1 announced that the original Basketball Wives would be renewed for a sixth season after nearly four years off the air, however, would be relocated to Los Angeles and feature a hybrid cast from the Miami-based series and its Los Angeles-based spin-off. The revival of the sixth season premiered on April 17, 2017.

== Cast timeline ==
Main cast members
Cast member	Seasons				
Cast member	1	2	3	4	5
Kimsha Artest	Main (Note: Appears in 1 episode only.)				
Jackie Christie	Main	Main	Main	Main	Main
Gloria Govan	Main	Main			
Laura Govan	Main	Main			Guest
Draya Michele	Main	Main	Main	Main	
Malaysia Pargo	Main	Main	Main	Main	Main
Imani Showalter	Main	Guest			
Tanya Williams	Main (Note: Appears in 2 episodes only.)				
Brooke Bailey		Main			Guest
Sundy Carter		Guest	Main		Guest
Brandi Maxiell			Main	Main	Main
Brittish Williams			Main		
Mehgan James				Main	
Shaunie O'Neal				Main	Main
Angel Brinks				Friend	Main
LaTosha Duffey					Main
Angel Love					Main
Tami Roman				Friend	Main
Friends of the wives
Bambi Benson		Friend			
Chantel Christie	Guest	Guest	Friend	Guest	Guest
Patrice Curry				Friend	

== Series overview ==
Basketball Wives LA episodes
Season	Episodes		Originally released		Average Viewers (millions)
Season	Episodes		First released	Last released	Average Viewers (millions)
1	14		August 29, 2011	November 28, 2011	1.70
2	16		September 10, 2012	December 17, 2012	1.75
3	11		February 17, 2014	April 28, 2014	2.06
4	13		July 12, 2015	October 11, 2015	1.43
5	16		July 17, 2016	October 23, 2016	1.37
6	17		April 17, 2017	August 14, 2017	TBA
7	17		May 14, 2018	September 16, 2018	TBA
8	18		June 19, 2019	October 16, 2019	TBA
9	7		February 9, 2021	March 23, 2021	TBA
10	26	13	May 16, 2022	August 1, 2022	TBA
10	26	13	February 13, 2023	May 8, 2023	TBA
11	26	13	October 9, 2023	January 15, 2024	TBA
11	26	13	July 1, 2024	September 23, 2024	TBA
12	TBA		May 5, 2025	TBA	TBA

== Specials ==
=== Basketball Wives LA Overtime Special ===
On October 31, 2011, Tami Roman hosted a half-hour Basketball Wives LA overtime special in which she sat down with Jackie Christie and Laura Govan about the change of tide in episode ten and what it may mean to the ladies in the final episodes of the first season.
