= List of Basketball Wives episodes =

Basketball Wives is an American reality television series on VH1. It chronicles the lives of women who have been romantically linked to professional basketball players in the National Basketball Association.

The first five seasons were filmed in Miami, Florida, with several cast members relocating to Los Angeles, combining the cast with the show's LA-based spin-off, Basketball Wives LA. The original incarnation of Basketball Wives premiered on April 11, 2010, and ended on October 21, 2013. The series was later revived for a sixth season, which began airing on April 17, 2017.

As of July 28, 2025, a total of 184 original episodes of Basketball Wives have aired.

== Series overview ==
Season	Episodes		Originally released	
Season	Episodes		First released	Last released
1	9		April 11, 2010	June 20, 2010
2	12		December 12, 2010	March 14, 2011
3	12		May 30, 2011	August 22, 2011
4	17		February 20, 2012	June 12, 2012
5	10		August 19, 2013	October 21, 2013
6	17		April 17, 2017	August 14, 2017
7	17		May 14, 2018	September 16, 2018
8	18		June 19, 2019	October 16, 2019
9	7		February 9, 2021	March 23, 2021
10	26	13	May 16, 2022	August 1, 2022
10	26	13	February 13, 2023	May 8, 2023
11	26	13	October 9, 2023	January 15, 2024
11	26	13	July 1, 2024	September 23, 2024
12	12		May 5, 2025	July 28, 2025

== Episodes ==
=== Season 1 (2010) ===
No. overall	No. in season	Title	Original release date	U.S. viewers (millions)
1	1	"Series Premiere"	April 11, 2010	1.58
Fresh off her highly publicized filing for divorce from megastar basketball legend Shaquille O'Neal, Shaunie O'Neal returns to Miami for a night out with fellow basketball wives and girlfriends.
2	2	"Episode 2"	April 18, 2010	1.39
Evelyn throws herself a lavish 34th birthday party, which well-meaning Royce nearly tanks with a surprise dance routine. Also, Jen struggles with the idea of sticking it out in her troubled marriage to Eric Williams.
3	3	"Episode 3"	April 25, 2010	1.28
Evelyn and Jen leave Miami to visit basketball fiancée Gloria Govan and her soon-to-be hubby Matt Barnes in Orlando. When Jen and Evelyn engage the couple in a discussion of why athletes cheat, drama ensues.
4	4	"Episode 4"	May 2, 2010	1.36
Emotions get heated and things quickly take an ugly turn when Gloria defends her sister's role in an alleged scandal involving Shaunie. Meanwhile, Jen and Eric look to solve their marital issues with a new luxury home.
5	5	"Episode 5"	May 9, 2010	1.23
Suzie's efforts to fix up newly-single Evelyn with a local producer crashes with a thud, but not as fast as the relationship between Royce and Gloria once Royce finds out Gloria's been talking about her behind her back.
6	6	"Episode 6"	May 16, 2010	1.30
Jen's upcoming Haiti benefit inspires Royce to invite the girls to make a difference on a personal level at a local soup kitchen, though Evelyn finds her motives suspect.
7	7	"Episode 7"	May 23, 2010	1.24
Shaunie returns to Miami to check up on the girls, and galpal Erikka is surprised by lingering feelings when she's reunited with ex-boyfriend and professional basketball player, Rasual Butler.
8	8	"Season Finale"	May 30, 2010	0.91
Shaunie gives the girls a break from the Miami heat in her new hometown, Los Angeles. But all of them wind up in the hot seat during a season-ending dinner conversation that ends with almost everyone in tears. This episode marks the final regular Appearance of Gloria.
9	9	"The Reunion"	June 20, 2010	1.04
Host Tanika Ray reunites as the cast returns to recap, reminisce, and revisit the dramatic first season. A surprise guest shows up, letting residue from a past dispute "spill" out onto the reunion stage.

=== Season 2 (2010–11) ===
No. overall	No. in season	Title	Original release date	U.S. viewers (millions)
10	1	"Season Premiere"	December 12, 2010	1.41
Evelyn draws the line with Suzie over unchecked gossip about a hot weekend in Vegas. Also, Shaunie's attempt to bring Kenny Anderson's ex, Tami, into the circle is met with skepticism. The episode ends with a shocking surprise. Tami Roman is added to the opening credits replacing Gloria Govan, who is demoted to a recurring cast member
11	2	"Episode 2"	December 19, 2010	1.14
Fallout over Suzie and Evelyn's argument has Suzie on the run to an unexpected source….GLORIA! Also, Tami reintroduces her daughters to father Kenny Anderson after many years apart. This episode marks the first appearance of Kim Russell and Juli Richmond.
12	3	"Episode 3"	January 2, 2011	N/A
Shaunie and the ladies launch a surprise ambush on Gloria to find out why her wedding was called off. Jen and Eric finally have "the talk" that will alter the course of their relationship forever.
13	4	"Episode 4"	January 9, 2011	1.38
When Evelyn and Jen finds themselves left off the guest list of a posh fundraiser thrown by circle outsider Ashley Walker, they decide to crash the event. Tempers flare when Tami and Jen get into it over an innocuous remark.
14	5	"Episode 5"	January 16, 2011	1.24
Evelyn and Jen regret volunteering to help Royce and her man Dwayne with a fashion fundraiser. Also, Tami has some surgery done, helping her to lose pounds and setting the stage to gain a friend.
15	6	"Episode 6"	January 23, 2011	1.15
Evelyn is back on the dating scene with a date that ends with a miss…and then one with a kiss. The tension between Jen & Eric reaches a new mark.
16	7	"Episode 7"	January 30, 2011	1.10
Shaunie's surprise announcement of a trip abroad delays Evelyn's connection with flirtatious football icon Chad Ochocinco.
17	8	"Episode 8"	February 6, 2011	0.98
The ladies' trip to Madrid suffers from both Royce's phantom illness and Tami's sudden mood swings. Jen also finds a romantic mark and the women get piggish on the local cuisine.
18	9	"Episode 9"	February 20, 2011	1.05
Jen & Ev accuse Royce of playing both sides by also being friends with outsiders Suzie & Ashley. Additionally, Ashley Walker and player Rafer Alston ambush Jen & Ev to prove that they are, in fact, a genuine item.
19	–	"Top 10 Flagrant Fouls"	February 27, 2011	N/A
Comedian Patrice O'Neal looks back at the top ten moments from Basketball Wives' current season and "Bonus Beefs" from season one.
20	10	"Season Finale"	March 6, 2011	2.28
Evelyn's weekend in Cincinnati with Chad Ochocinco could just be the start of something big. The shocking final act disclosure of a past infidelity links two of the wives and ends the season with an explosive showdown.
21	11	"Reunion: Part 1"	March 13, 2011	1.36
Host John Salley reunites the cast to break down the explosive season finale. He also takes viewers through the ladies' individual journeys this season.
22	12	"Reunion: Part 2"	March 14, 2011	1.90
Host John Salley presses the cast on Jen's recent nude photo scandal and Evelyn's romance with superstar football player Chad Ochocinco. The reunion is also rocked by a couple of surprise guests that are sure to cause an uproar. This episode marks the final appearance of Gloria Govan.

=== Season 3 (2011) ===
No. overall	No. in season	Title	Original release date	U.S. viewers (millions)
23	1	"Season Premiere"	May 30, 2011	1.83
While Royce is at odds with Evelyn, Jen and Tami are bent on preventing Evelyn from profiting off the hurtful phrase that launched their season-ending brawl. Is it too late to make amends? Meeka Claxton is added to the opening credits.
24	2	"Episode 2"	June 6, 2011	1.75
Suzie's return to the circle upsets Royce. Also, sparks fly when Tami takes Meeka to task for playing both sides.
25	3	"Episode 3"	June 13, 2011	1.86
Royce's father raises concerns about his daughter's new boyfriend. Also, Evelyn checks out a fertility clinic as she prepares to begin a family with Chad Ochocinco.
26	4	"Episode 4"	June 20, 2011	1.63
Jen's curiosity and suspicions are piqued when Eric wants to take a meeting with Suzie. Also, more than mallets are swinging when Tami and Meeka get into it at an upscale polo event.
27	5	"Episode 5"	June 27, 2011	1.73
A trip to the Big Apple turns sour as Evelyn and Tami's beef over Ev's T-shirts resurfaces. Also, Jen agrees to her first date since splitting with Eric and Evelyn reconciles with her long-absent father.
28	6	"Episode 6"	July 11, 2011	1.86
Shaunie makes waves when she proposes another international girls' trip but excludes Royce from the guest list.
29	7	"Episode 7"	July 18, 2011	2.04
It's an Italian vacation complete with extra baggage as Evelyn's reaction to a radio interview given by Jen threatens to end their friendship and Tami and Meeka butt heads over loose talk and leaving Royce behind.
30	8	"Episode 8"	July 25, 2011	2.33
The ladies' trip to Italy explodes as Tami's feud with Meeka reaches the boiling point, and one member of the circle calls it quits over the drama.
31	9	"Episode 9"	August 1, 2011	2.01
Royce's meeting with Eric makes Jen's blood boil. Chad surprises Evelyn with a unique outing, and Jen finds chemistry on a blind date set up by pal Al Reynolds.
32	10	"Season Finale"	August 8, 2011	2.60
Chad and Evelyn get into it when Evelyn spots him having lunch with another woman. Also, Jen's wild divorce party heats up when her date for the evening arrives.
33	11	"Reunion: Part 1"	August 15, 2011	2.57
Host John Salley returns as he reunites the cast to break down the explosive season finale.
34	12	"Reunion: Part 2"	August 22, 2011	2.87
John Salley coaxes the ladies into dishing more dirt about their drama with Meeka and the status of Evelyn's relationship with Chad is also up for discussion. This episode marks the final appearance of Meeka.

=== Season 4 (2012) ===
No. overall	No. in season	Title	Original release date	U.S. viewers (millions)
35	1	"Season Premiere"	February 20, 2012	2.50
The explosive fourth season opens in NY to reveal Jen & Evelyn's ten-year friendship on the rocks. Two new ladies are also introduced to the mix: wife/aspiring singer Kenya Bell & ex-fiancee/professional dancer Kesha Nichols. Kesha Nichols and Kenya Bell are added to the opening credits, replacing departing cast member Meeka .
36	2	"Episode 2"	February 27, 2012	2.04
Evelyn and Chad meet to discuss social media accusations of infidelity, while the ladies discover some shocking videos of Kenya online.
37	3	"Episode 3"	March 5, 2012	1.93
Shaunie, Evelyn, & Tami take Kenya to task over throwing Kesha under the bus at her music video auditions. Suzie's behavior at a charity event raises eyebrows, & Tami takes to the therapist's couch to combat her anger issues.
38	4	"Episode 4"	March 12, 2012	1.90
Tami sees red over Kesha talking behind her back. Also, the ladies are conspicuously absent from one of Jen's lip gloss launch events.
39	5	"Episode 5"	March 19, 2012	1.78
Shaunie's birthday party goes south when Evelyn attacks Jen over loyalty and how she's changed in the spotlight of fame. Also, Suzie and Royce drop in on Kesha's family farm in North Carolina while en route to Miami.
40	6	"Episode 6"	March 26, 2012	1.97
The fallout from Jen and Ev's confrontation at Shaunie's birthday party continues, and Ev lays into Kenya for calling her "loose".
41	7	"Episode 7"	April 2, 2012	1.72
Kenya tries to explain herself after some nasty gossip loops back to Evelyn, but things really heat up when Kesha brings in a friend to collaborate her version of the story.
42	8	"Episode 8"	April 9, 2012	1.77
Evelyn and Kenya's feud over loose talk escalates to the point of no return. Also, Suzie's penchant for peacemaking returns as she takes a stab at squashing Royce and Jen's beef.
43	9	"Episode 9"	April 16, 2012	2.02
A trip to the races turns explosive when Evelyn's friend and assistant Nia challenges Jen's recent behavior. Also, Tami and her mother work through some of their issues.
44	10	"Episode 10"	April 23, 2012	1.87
Fallout from Evelyn, Jen, and Nia's altercation at the racetrack deepens the divides within the group. Also, Royce introduces boyfriend Dezmon Briscoe to the girls.
45	11	"Episode 11"	April 30, 2012	1.76
Evelyn and Chad discuss their upcoming wedding while Royce and her father get into it over Royce's relationship with football player Dezmon Briscoe.
46	12	"Episode 12"	May 7, 2012	1.74
The ladies leave Miami behind for a girls' trip to Tahiti, setting the stage for an epic showdown between Tami and Kesha.
47	13	"Episode 13"	May 14, 2012	2.03
The girls play a practical joke on Kenya. Also, Tami and Kesha's conflict escalates, driving one of them to cut their island vacation short.
48	14	"Episode 14"	May 21, 2012	1.94
Jen's standoffish behavior and declaration that she's "lawyered up" irritates Shaunie and Tami, turning up the heat on the final days of the girls' Tahiti trip.
49	15	"Season Finale"	May 28, 2012	1.78
The ladies' trip to Tahiti erupts when Jen is called out on her erratic behavior. After the trip, Shaunie seeks an assist from a higher power in making a life-altering decision.
50	16	"Reunion: Part 1"	June 4, 2012	2.24
John Salley is back as host as the ladies reunite and questions are answered. Can Evelyn and Jennifer finally reconcile their differences? Will Tami apologize to Kesha for her behavior in Tahiti?
51	17	"Reunion: Part 2"	June 11, 2012	2.22
In the final hour of the reunion, tears flow and tempers flare as host John Salley holds no topic off-limits. Also, Shaunie reveals her thoughts on the season's final scene. This episode marks the final appearances of Royce and Kesha, as well as the final regular appearances of Kenya and Jennifer (until the sixth season )

=== Season 5 (2013) ===
No. overall	No. in season	Title	Original release date	U.S. viewers (millions)
52	1	"Season Premiere"	August 19, 2013	2.40
Evelyn takes on the media for the first time after an altercation with her husband. Also, Tami tries to convince her to give the marriage a second chance. Tasha Marbury is added to the opening credits replacing departing cast members Kesha, Jennifer and Royce. Kenya is removed from the opening credits and demoted to a recurring cast member
53	2	"Episode 2"	August 26, 2013	1.97
Evelyn's friend Tasha Marbury meets the ladies while Suzie and Tami's insatiable curiosity about an old tabloid scandal makes waves.
54	3	"Episode 3"	September 2, 2013	1.72
The ladies deal with the fallout of Suzie's grilling of Tasha Marbury. Also, Tami raises questions within the group by failing to show for Evelyn's big birthday blowout.
55	4	"Episode 4"	September 9, 2013	1.74
Evelyn takes her issues with her ex to the therapist's couch. Also, Tami expresses her displeasure with Shaunie "planting a bad seed" about her with Tasha.
56	5	"Episode 5"	September 16, 2013	1.97
Tasha's "headbutting" jokes land her and Suzie in hot water with Evelyn. Also, Shaunie tries her hand at producing a play.
57	6	"Episode 6"	September 23, 2013	1.72
Tasha's weave bar grand opening proves more hot mess than hot press. Also, Shaunie, Evelyn and Suzie's early departure from Tasha's birthday party leaves the birthday girl in a bad mood.
58	7	"Episode 7"	September 30, 2013	1.82
Tasha takes Shaunie, Suzie and Evelyn to task for leaving her birthday party but it's what she asks Tami afterward that takes the cake. Also, Suzie and Tasha sprout their own feud after a hotel powwow.
59	8	"Episode 8"	October 7, 2013	2.12
Shaunie announces a girls' trip to London Fashion Week that puts Evelyn's clothing line plans into overdrive. Later, Shaunie's boxing date with Marlon leaves her feeling punchy.
60	9	"Episode 9"	October 14, 2013	1.93
During a whirlwind week in London, Evelyn sweats her hastily arranged Fashion Week debut while the group comes together to help Tasha and Suzie squash their beef.
61	10	"Season Finale"	October 21, 2013	2.23
The ladies help Tasha go toe to toe with a woman who's been posting about her husband online. Also, a surprise invitation to a Kenya Bell performance tests Suzie's patience. This episode marks the final appearance of Suzie, Tasha and Kenya.

=== Season 6 (2017) ===
No. overall	No. in season	Title	Original release date	U.S. viewers (millions)
62	1	"Season Premiere"	April 17, 2017	2.61
63	2	"Episode 2"	April 24, 2017	2.07
64	3	"Episode 3"	May 1, 2017	2.01
65	4	"Episode 4"	May 7, 2017	0.65
66	5	"Episode 5"	May 8, 2017	1.89
67	6	"Episode 6"	May 15, 2017	1.91
68	7	"Episode 7"	May 22, 2017	1.98
69	8	"Episode 8"	June 5, 2017	2.09
70	9	"Episode 9"	June 12, 2017	1.81
71	10	"Episode 10"	June 19, 2017	2.06
72	11	"Episode 11"	June 26, 2017	1.95
73	12	"Episode 12"	July 10, 2017	2.26
74	13	"Episode 13"	July 17, 2017	2.19
75	14	"Episode 14"	July 24, 2017	2.05
76	15	"Episode 15"	July 31, 2017	1.93
77	16	"Season Finale"	August 7, 2017	2.18
78	17	"The Reunion"	August 14, 2017	2.18

=== Season 7 (2018) ===
No. overall	No. in season	Title	Original release date	U.S. viewers (millions)
79	1	"Season Premiere"	May 14, 2018	1.87
80	2	"Episode 2"	May 21, 2018	1.71
81	3	"Episode 3"	May 28, 2018	1.59
82	4	"Episode 4"	June 4, 2018	1.82
83	5	"Episode 5"	June 11, 2018	1.96
84	6	"Episode 6"	June 25, 2018	1.89
85	7	"Episode 7"	July 2, 2018	1.86
86	8	"Episode 8"	July 8, 2018	1.06
87	9	"Episode 9"	July 16, 2018	1.67
88	10	"Episode 10"	July 30, 2018	1.59
89	11	"Episode 11"	August 5, 2018	0.94
90	12	"Episode 12"	August 12, 2018	0.90
91	13	"Episode 13"	August 19, 2018	0.92
92	14	"Episode 14"	August 26, 2018	1.07
93	15	"Episode 15"	September 2, 2018	0.86
94	16	"Season Finale"	September 9, 2018	1.09
95	17	"The Reunion"	September 16, 2018	1.17

=== Season 8 (2019) ===
No. overall	No. in season	Title	Original release date	U.S. viewers (millions)
96	1	"Season Premiere"	June 19, 2019	0.97
97	2	"Episode 2"	June 26, 2019	0.99
98	3	"Episode 3"	July 3, 2019	0.70
99	4	"Episode 4"	July 10, 2019	0.93
100	5	"Episode 5"	July 17, 2019	1.06
101	6	"Episode 6"	July 24, 2019	1.04
102	7	"Episode 7"	July 31, 2019	0.99
103	8	"Episode 8"	August 7, 2019	1.09
104	9	"Episode 9"	August 14, 2019	1.23
105	10	"Episode 10"	August 21, 2019	1.31
106	11	"Episode 11"	August 28, 2019	1.18
107	12	"Episode 12"	September 4, 2019	1.07
108	13	"Episode 13"	September 11, 2019	1.07
109	14	"Episode 14"	September 18, 2019	1.23
110	15	"Episode 15"	September 25, 2019	1.13
111	16	"Season Finale"	October 2, 2019	1.23
112	17	"Reunion – Part 1"	October 9, 2019	1.34
113	18	"Reunion – Part 2"	October 16, 2019	1.21

=== Season 9 (2021) ===
No. overall	No. in season	Title	Original release date	U.S. viewers (millions)
114	1	"Season Premiere"	February 9, 2021	0.54
115	2	"Episode 2"	February 16, 2021	0.40
116	3	"Episode 3"	February 23, 2021	0.54
117	4	"Episode 4"	March 2, 2021	0.48
118	5	"Episode 5"	March 9, 2021	0.49
119	6	"Episode 6"	March 16, 2021	0.46
120	7	"Season Finale"	March 23, 2021	0.46

=== Season 10 (2022–23) ===
No. overall	No. in season	Title	Original release date	U.S. viewers (millions)
Part 1
121	1	"Season Premiere"	May 16, 2022	0.52
122	2	"Episode 2"	May 23, 2022	0.42
123	3	"Episode 3"	May 30, 2022	0.43
124	4	"Episode 4"	June 6, 2022	0.41
125	5	"Episode 5"	June 13, 2022	0.55
126	6	"Episode 6"	June 20, 2022	0.46
127	7	"Episode 7"	June 27, 2022	0.48
128	8	"Episode 8"	July 4, 2022	0.42
129	9	"Episode 9"	July 11, 2022	0.43
130	10	"Episode 10"	July 11, 2022	0.48
131	11	"Episode 11"	July 18, 2022	0.51
132	12	"Episode 12"	July 25, 2022	0.41
133	13	"Episode 13"	August 1, 2022	0.59
Part 2
134	14	"Episode 14"	February 13, 2023	0.51
135	15	"Episode 15"	February 20, 2023	0.44
136	16	"Episode 16"	February 27, 2023	0.37
137	17	"Episode 17"	March 6, 2023	0.32
138	18	"Episode 18"	March 13, 2023	0.42
139	19	"Episode 19"	March 20, 2023	0.33
140	20	"Episode 20"	March 27, 2023	0.40
141	21	"Episode 21"	April 3, 2023	0.42
142	22	"Episode 22"	April 10, 2023	0.38
143	23	"Episode 23"	April 17, 2023	0.32
144	24	"Episode 24"	April 24, 2023	0.34
145	25	"Season Finale"	May 1, 2023	0.37
146	26	"The Reunion"	May 8, 2023	0.35

=== Season 11 (2023–24) ===
No. overall	No. in season	Title	Original release date	U.S. viewers (millions)
Part 1
147	1	"Back in the Building!"	October 9, 2023	0.45
148	2	"Homewreckers"	October 16, 2023	0.33
149	3	"Ice Queens"	October 23, 2023	0.44
150	4	"Who Are You, Where Did You Come From?"	October 30, 2023	0.40
151	5	"Cooking with Fire"	November 6, 2023	0.41
152	6	"Turning Up the Heat"	November 13, 2023	0.33
153	7	"The Double Standard"	November 20, 2023	0.23
154	8	"Not So Magic Mike"	November 27, 2023	0.28
155	9	"Wrong Impressions"	December 4, 2023	0.30
156	10	"Pain to Purpose"	December 11, 2023	0.28
157	11	"Shop Til You Pop"	December 18, 2023	0.28
158	12	"Love Lost & Love Found"	January 8, 2024	0.33
159	13	"The Reunion"	January 15, 2024	0.35
Part 2
160	14	"A Liar's Gonna Lie"	July 1, 2024	0.21
161	15	"Secrets, Lies and Private Eyes"	July 8, 2024	0.26
162	16	"Uninvited Guests, Unintended Consequences"	July 15, 2024	0.29
163	17	"Don't Call Me Sweetie"	July 22, 2024	0.27
164	18	"I'm a Sh*t Finisher"	July 29, 2024	0.30
165	19	"This Is Beneath Me!"	August 5, 2024	0.31
166	20	"She's Not Worth Your Taco"	August 12, 2024	0.34
167	21	"Once a Cheater, Always a Cheater"	August 19, 2024	0.34
168	22	"Getting Messy in Mexico"	August 26, 2024	0.38
169	23	"Shots Poured, Shots Fired"	September 2, 2024	0.38
170	24	"You Can't Even Spell Wife"	September 9, 2024	0.38
171	25	"Sisterhood of the Traveling Drama"	September 16, 2024	0.32
172	26	"The Reunion: Hot Mics and Spicy Drama"	September 23, 2024	0.38

=== Season 12 (2025) ===
No. overall	No. in season	Title	Original release date	U.S. viewers (millions)
173	1	"It's Giving Foe"	May 5, 2025	0.30
174	2	"Win, Lose, or Brawl"	May 12, 2025	0.26
175	3	"Bad Ty/Ming"	May 19, 2025	0.27
176	4	"Friends and Foes Do Vegas"	May 26, 2025	0.22
177	5	"Magic, Mess, & Matrimony"	June 2, 2025	0.26
178	6	"Wacky Attackin' Jackie"	June 16, 2025	0.32
179	7	"We're Done Talking"	June 23, 2025	0.29
180	8	"Poppin' Off"	June 30, 2025	0.22
181	9	"The New Queen Has Arrived"	July 7, 2025	0.28
182	10	"Go, Deadbeat, Go!"	July 14, 2025	0.26
183	11	"Aloha Bitches"	July 21, 2025	0.36
184	12	"Threesome, Two, One, Action!"	July 28, 2025	0.32
