= Football Wives (American TV series) =

- Genre: Reality television
- Country of origin: United States
- Original language: English
- No. of seasons: 1
- No. of episodes: 8

Production
- Executive producers: Alex Demyanenko; Jeff Olde; Jennifer O'Connell; Jill Holmes; Leola Westbrook; Nick Emmerson; Noah Pollack; Phil Robinson; Shaunie O'Neal
- Running time: 21 minutes
- Production company: Shed Media US

Original release
- Network: VH1
- Release: October 24 – December 19, 2010

Football Wives cast

Football Wives is an American reality television series that premiered October 24, 2010, on VH1. Football Wives showcases lives of the wives and girlfriends of professional football players.

== Cast ==
- Amanda Davis, married to Dallas offensive lineman Leonard Davis
- Chanita Foster, wife of offensive lineman George Foster
- Melani Ismail, wife of former college and pro-football star Raghib Ismail
- Brittany Pigrenet, girlfriend of Dallas kicker David Buehler
- Dawn Neufeld, wife of tight end Ryan Neufeld
- Erin McBriar, wife of Dallas punter Mat McBriar
- Pilar Sanders, wife of retired All-Pro cornerback Deion Sanders
- Mercedes Nelson, ex-girlfriend of Dallas Cowboys running back Marion Barber

== Episodes ==
No.	Title	Original release date
1	"God, the Devil, and Dallas"	October 21, 2010
2	"Dog Walkers and Smack Talkers"	October 31, 2010
3	"He Could Go All the Way"	November 7, 2010
4	"Passion for Fashion"	November 14, 2010
5	"The Agony and the Ecstasy"	November 21, 2010
6	"The Defensive Line"	November 28, 2010
7	"Texas Two-Step"	December 12, 2010
8	"The End Zone"	December 19, 2010
