= Basketball Wives =

American reality TV series

- Genre: Reality television
- Created by: Shaunie Henderson
- Starring: Gloria Govan; Shaunie Henderson; Suzie Ketcham; Evelyn Lozada; Royce Reed; Jennifer Williams; Tami Roman; Meeka Claxton; Kenya Bell; Kesha Nichols; Tasha Marbury; Jackie Christie; Malaysia Pargo; Laura Govan; Brooke Bailey; Brandi Maxiell; Brittish Williams; Angel Brinks; LaTosha Duffey; Jac'Eil Duckworth; Brittany Renner; Vanessa Rider; Chantel Christie-Jeffries; Denise Reann Garcia; Ming Lee; Ty Young
- Country of origin: United States
- Original language: English
- No. of seasons: 12
- No. of episodes: 184 (list of episodes)

Production
- Executive producers: Shaunie Henderson; Steven Weinstock; Glenda Hersh; Lauren Eskelin; Lorraine Haughton-Lawson; Julie "Bob" Lombardi; Paula Arnada; Jennifer Aguirre; Kenny Loeliger-Myers; Mark Seliga; Alissa Horowitz; Yessica Garcia; Katie Sole
- Camera setup: Multiple
- Running time: 20–23 minutes (season 1); 42–44 minutes (seasons 2–12)
- Production companies: Shed Media; Truly Original (2019–2025); MTV Entertainment Studios (2022–2023); VH1 (2024–2025)

Original release
- Network: VH1
- Release: April 11, 2010 – July 28, 2025

Related
- Football Wives; Basketball Wives LA; Baseball Wives; Ev and Ocho; Shaunie's Home Court; Baller Wives; Shaunie & Keion's Destination "I Do"; Basketball Wives Orlando

Basketball Wives is an American reality television series broadcast on VH1. It has aired twelve seasons, and follows the everyday lives of women romantically linked to players in the professional basketball industry. The first five seasons were filmed in Miami, Florida, and aired from April 11, 2010 until October 21, 2013. The spin-off series, Basketball Wives LA, also aired five seasons from August 29, 2011 until October 23, 2016. The original Basketball Wives was rebooted and relocated to Los Angeles, California beginning with the sixth season, which premiered on April 17, 2017. Some Basketball Wives LA cast members were combined into the original series, and subsequent seasons are considered continuous with the original series by the network.

Basketball Wives cast members that have appeared on both runs include Shaunie Henderson, Evelyn Lozada, Tami Roman, and Jennifer Williams. Basketball Wives LA cast members that were combined into the second run include Jackie Christie, Malaysia Pargo, Brooke Bailey, Brandi Maxiell, Brittish Williams, Angel Brinks, and LaTosha Duffey. The twelfth season cast featured Christie, Lozada, Maxiell, Williams, Brittany Renner, Chantel Christie-Jeffries, Denise Reann Garcia, Ming Lee, and Ty Young, with Henderson making guest appearances.

The success of Basketball Wives has led to the spin-offs Football Wives, Baseball Wives, Shaunie's Homecourt, Baller Wives and Basketball Wives Orlando.

== Production ==
=== Seasons 1–5 (Miami) ===
The first season premiered on April 11, 2010, and ran for eight weeks in 30-minute episodes. The announced cast included Jennifer Williams, wife of Eric Williams, Evelyn Lozada, ex-fiancé of Antoine Walker, Mesha O'Neal, wife of Jermaine O'Neal, Royce Reed, former NBA team dancer and the mother of Dwight Howard's oldest son, Faith Rein, Udonis Haslem's girlfriend, and Shaunie O'Neal, wife of Shaquille O'Neal, who would also serve as an executive producer on the series. Mesha and Faith were replaced by Michael Olowokandi's ex-girlfriend Suzie Ketcham and Matt Barnes' fiancée Gloria Govan when the show aired. Erikka Moxam, ex-girlfriend of Rasual Butler, appeared in a supporting role. A spin-off, Football Wives, featuring the wives and girlfriend of professional football players, aired from October 24 to December 19, 2010.

The show was renewed for a second season of hour-long episodes, which premiered on December 12, 2010. Tami Roman, ex-wife of Kenny Anderson, was added to the cast, replacing Gloria Govan who was demoted to a supporting role, alongside Juli Richmond, wife of Mitch Richmond, Kimberli Russell, wife of Bryon Russell, and Ashley Walker, mother of Rafer Alston's children. Meeka Claxton, wife of Speedy Claxton, joined the cast in season three, which premiered on May 30, 2011, to 1.8 million viewers.

The fourth season premiered on February 20, 2012, following the spin-off Basketball Wives LA, which concluded in November 2011. Meeka departed the series and was replaced by new cast members Kesha Nichols, ex-fiancée of Richard Jefferson, and Kenya Bell, wife of Charlie Bell. On March 12, 2012, VH1 announced the spin-off Ev and Ocho, starring Evelyn Lozada and her fiancé Chad Ochocinco, set to air that September. However, three weeks before the show was to premiere, they shelved the series, following Ochocinco's arrest for assaulting Lozada, and subsequent divorce.

The fifth season premiered on August 19, 2013, following the second season of Basketball Wives LA, which concluded in December 2012. Tasha Marbury, wife of Stephon Marbury, joined the cast, while Royce, Jennifer and Kesha were dropped from the series. Kenya would return in the season finale. According to a 2014 tweet from Tami Roman, the show was quietly canceled.

=== Seasons 6–12 (Los Angeles) ===
On March 27, 2017, VH1 announced that the show would be retooled, airing under its original moniker Basketball Wives after nearly four years off the air. The sixth season premiered on April 17, 2017. Basketball Wives's Evelyn Lozada would return to the franchise with Basketball Wives LA's Jackie Christie and Malaysia Pargo, along with Shaunie O'Neal and Tami Roman who starred in both incarnations. Basketball Wives's Jennifer Williams and Basketball Wives LA's Brandi Maxiell would return in supporting roles, with new cast members Keonna Green, ex-girlfriend of Nick Young, Bonnie-Jill Laflin, girlfriend of Kareem Rush, Elena Ahanzadeh, Joe Crawford's girlfriend Cristen Metoyer and her sister Aja, stylist Saniy'yah Samaa, and Hazel Renee.

Jennifer was promoted to the main cast in season seven, which premiered on May 14, 2018. New cast members included Kristen Scott, wife of former league coach Thomas Scott, CeCe Gutierrez, girlfriend of Byron Scott, and professional athlete Ogom "OG" Chijindu, girlfriend of basketball player Kwame Alexander. All cast members returned for season eight, premiering on June 19, 2019, along with Feby Torres, ex-girlfriend of Lance Stephenson. Tami Roman departed the show halfway through the season, citing other career opportunities, as well as CeCe. After over a year long hiatus due to the COVID-19 pandemic, the show returned for a ninth season on February 9, 2021, with new cast members Liza Morales, ex-girlfriend of Lamar Odom, Nia Dorsey, ex-girlfriend of Lance Stephenson and her sister Noria Dorsey, wife of Shawn Taggart.

On April 18, 2022, VH1 announced the show's return for a tenth season, which premiered on May 16, 2022. Following the conclusion of the ninth season, Evelyn Lozada announced her departure from the series in April 2022, while Kristen Scott, Ogom Chijindu, Feby Torres and Liza Morales were not asked back by producers. For the tenth season, three of the five cast members from the previous season returned. Jackie Christie, Malaysia Pargo and Jennifer Williams were joined by former Basketball Wives LA alumnae, Angel Brinks, Brandi Maxiell, Brooke Bailey, Brittish Williams and LaTosha Duffey. In addition to this, Shaunie O'Neal, Nia Dorsey, and Noria Dorsey made multiple guest appearances throughout the season. On August 1, 2022, during the mid-season finale of season 10, VH1 announced that additional episodes will air soon. On January 23, 2023, VH1 confirmed that the second half will premiere on February 13, 2023. After the sixteenth episode of the tenth season, Pargo exited the show, making Christie the last original basketball wife from the LA series. On May 8, 2023, Duffey announced her exit from the show following the conclusion of the tenth series.

On June 14, 2023, VH1 announced the show's eleventh season would premiere on October 9, 2023. Christie, Bailey and Williams returned. Lozada also returned as a full-time cast member, along with new cast members Brittany Renner, ex-girlfriend of P. J. Washington, Vanessa Rider, wife of Isaiah Rider, Jac'Eil Duckworth, girlfriend of Natasha Howard and Clayanna Warthen, ex-girlfriend of Andre Iguodala, the latter was cited as a supporting cast member. Brinks, Maxiell and Brittish Williams did not return. On May 30, 2024, VH1 announced that the second half of season eleven would premiere on July 1, 2024, with Maxiell returning to the cast. Rider, Warthen and Renner departed the series. Former cast members Laura Govan and Shaunie Henderson (formerly O'Neal) made guest appearances during the eleventh season.

On March 25, 2025, it was announced that the twelfth season of the show would premiere on May 5, 2025. Lozada, Williams, Jackie Christie, and Maxiell returned. Renner also returned to the cast after her initial departure from the series following season 11A and Chantel Christie-Jeffries, daughter of Jackie Christie, was upgraded to a main cast member for the first time after appearing in previous seasons as a supporting cast member. Ming Lee and Ty Young, former WNBA player and Chicago Sky assistant coach, joined as new main cast members alongside Denise Reann Garcia, ex-girlfriend of Lonzo Ball, who also joined in a main capacity. Henderson continued to make guest appearances. Bailey and Duckworth departed the series. On January 29, 2026, Henderson stated the show would not return.

== Cast timeline ==
Basketball Wives main cast members
| Cast member | Seasons | | | | | | | | | | | | | |
| Cast member | Miami (2010–2013) | | | | | LA (2017–2025) | | | | | | | | |
| Cast member | 1 | 2 | 3 | 4 | 5 | 6 | 7 | 8 | 9 | 10A | 10B | 11A | 11B | 12 |
|---|---|---|---|---|---|---|---|---|---|---|---|---|---|---|
| Gloria Govan | Main | Recurring | | | | | | | | | | | | |
| Shaunie Henderson | Main | Main | Main | Main | Main | Main | Main | Main | Main | Guest | Guest | Guest | Guest | Guest |
| Suzie Ketcham | Main | Main | Main | Main | Main | | | | | | | | | |
| Evelyn Lozada | Main | Main | Main | Main | Main | Main | Main | Main | Main | | | Main | Main | Main |
| Royce Reed | Main | Main | Main | Main | | | | | | | | | | |
| Jennifer Williams | Main | Main | Main | Main | | Recurring | Main | Main | Main | Main | Main | Main | Main | Main |
| Tami Roman | | Main | Main | Main | Main | Main | Main | Main | | | | | | |
| Meeka Claxton | | | Main | | | | | | | | | | | |
| Kenya Bell | | | | Main | Recurring | | | | | | | | | |
| Kesha Nichols | | | | Main | | | | | | | | | | |
| Tasha Marbury | | | | | Main | | | | | | | | | |
| Jackie Christie (Note: Basketball Wives LA cast member) | | | | | | Main | Main | Main | Main | Main | Main | Main | Main | Main |
| Malaysia Pargo | | | | | | Main | Main | Main | Main | Main | Main | | | |
| Brooke Bailey | | | | | | | | | | Main | Main | Main | Main | |
| Brandi Maxiell | | | | | | Recurring | | | | Main | Main | | Main | Main |
| Brittish Williams | | | | | | | | | | Main | Main | | | |
| Angel Brinks | | | | | | | | | | Main | Main | | | |
| LaTosha Duffey | | | | | | | | | | Main | Main | | | |
| Jac'Eil Duckworth | | | | | | | | | | | | Main | Main | |
| Brittany Renner | | | | | | | | | | | | Main | | Main |
| Vanessa Rider | | | | | | | | | | | | Main | | |
| Denise Reann Garcia | | | | | | | | | | | | | | Main |
| Chantel Christie-Jeffries | | | | | | Guest | Guest | | | Guest | | | | Main |
| Ming Lee | | | | | | | | | | | | | | Main |
| Ty Young | | | | | | | | | | | | | | Main |
Recurring cast members
| Erikka Moxam | Recurring | | | | | | | | | | | | | |
| Juli Richmond | | Recurring | | | | | | | | | | | | |
| Kim Russell | | Recurring | | | | | | | | | | | | |
| Ashley Walker | | Recurring | Recurring | | | | | | | | | | | |
| Elena Ahanzadeh | | | | | | Recurring (Note: Appears in 3 episodes only, before being phased out from the show.) | Guest | Guest | | | | | | |
| Keonna Green | | | | | | Recurring (Note: Keonna disappeared and was blurred out from the show entirely after 9 episodes.) | | | | | | | | |
| Bonnie-Jill Laflin | | | | | | Recurring | | | | | | | | |
| Aja Metoyer | | | | | | Recurring (Note: Appears in 5 episodes only, before being phased out from the show.) | | | | | | | | |
| Cristen Metoyer | | | | | | Recurring | | | | | | | | |
| Hazel Renee | | | | | | Recurring | | | | | | | | |
| Saniy'yah Samaa | | | | | | Recurring | | | | | | | | |
| Ogom Chijindu | | | | | | | Recurring | Recurring | Recurring | | | | | |
| CeCe Gutierrez | | | | | | | Recurring | Recurring | | | | | | |
| Kristen Scott | | | | | | | Recurring | Recurring | Recurring | | | | | |
| Feby Torres | | | | | | | | Recurring | Recurring | | | | | |
| Nia Dorsey | | | | | | | | | Recurring | Recurring | | | | |
| Liza Morales | | | | | | | | | Recurring | | | | | |
| Noria Dorsey-Taggart | | | | | | | | | Recurring | Recurring | | | | |
| Clayanna Warthen | | | | | | | | | | | | Recurring | | |

== Series overview ==
| Season | Episodes | | Originally released | |
| Season | Episodes | | First released | Last released |
|---|---|---|---|---|
| 1 | 9 | | April 11, 2010 | June 20, 2010 |
| 2 | 12 | | December 12, 2010 | March 14, 2011 |
| 3 | 12 | | May 30, 2011 | August 22, 2011 |
| 4 | 17 | | February 20, 2012 | June 12, 2012 |
| 5 | 10 | | August 19, 2013 | October 21, 2013 |
| 6 | 17 | | April 17, 2017 | August 14, 2017 |
| 7 | 17 | | May 14, 2018 | September 16, 2018 |
| 8 | 18 | | June 19, 2019 | October 16, 2019 |
| 9 | 7 | | February 9, 2021 | March 23, 2021 |
| 10 | 26 | 13 | May 16, 2022 | August 1, 2022 |
| 10 | 26 | 13 | February 13, 2023 | May 8, 2023 |
| 11 | 26 | 13 | October 9, 2023 | January 15, 2024 |
| 11 | 26 | 13 | July 1, 2024 | September 23, 2024 |
| 12 | 12 | | May 5, 2025 | July 28, 2025 |

== Spin-offs and specials ==
A spin-off, Football Wives, featuring the wives and girlfriends of professional football players, aired from October 24 to December 19, 2010. A second spin-off, Baseball Wives, featuring the wives and girlfriends of baseball players from various different teams, aired from November 30, 2011 to January 29, 2012. On March 12, 2012, VH1 announced the spin-off Ev and Ocho, starring Evelyn Lozada and her fiancé Chad Ochocinco, set to air that September. However, three weeks before the show was to premiere, they shelved the series, following Ochocinco's arrest for assaulting Lozada, and subsequent divorce. On June 30, 2016, VH1 announced its new series "Shaunie's Home Court", which will follow O'Neal behind-the-scenes at home, where she spends the days tending to her brood of five, ranging in age from 10 to 19 years old. Shaunie's Home Court aired for two seasons. A fourth spin-off, Baller Wives, featuring the wives and girlfriends of professional football players, aired from August 14 to September 11, 2017. Since 2015, Shaunie O'Neal has discussed expanding the franchise to other cities, such as Houston, Dallas and Orlando. On July 12, 2017, Saniy'yah Samaa alleged that a spin-off in New York was in the works and had been cast, but VH1 never green-lit the project. During an interview she said the following: "I was sought out to do Basketball Wives in 2014. I was asked by someone on the show if I knew of any girls that would be good for the show, because we were doing Basketball Wives: New York."

On October 31, 2011, Tami Roman hosted a half-hour Basketball Wives LA overtime special in which she sat down with Jackie Christie and Laura Govan about the change of tide in episode ten and what it may mean to the ladies in the final episodes of the first season. On March 27, 2017, VH1 announced a pre-season special entitled "Basketball Wives Showdown: Evelyn vs. Tami" which premiered on April 10, 2017, highlighting fan favorite moments from Evelyn Lozada and Tami Roman's past seasons. Tami Roman and boyfriend Reggie Youngblood starred in their own, hour-long special on June 19, 2019, on VH1. It followed Roman, and longtime love Reggie Youngblood as they take the next step in their relationship.

On May 18, 2022, MTV Entertainment Studios announced that a wedding special, featuring Shaunie embarking on a second chance at love with Pastor Keion Henderson, is set to air later that year on VH1. On November 7, 2022, TheWrap reported that O'Neal and Keion would be starring in a three-week-event series, Shaunie and Keion's Destination "I Do", and released an exclusive first look clip. The show would make its series premiere on November 28, 2022.

On September 18, 2023, VH1 announced a pre-season clip show special, entitled Basketball Wives: All Star Moments, set to premiere on October 2, 2023, featuring Henderson and Lozada recapping moments of the show.
