= Kwame Alexander (basketball) =

American basketball player

No. 44 – Santos del Potosí
- Position: Small forward / power forward
- League: LNBP

Personal information
- Born: April 21, 1990 (age 36) Moreno Valley, California, U.S.
- Listed height: 6 ft 7 in (2.01 m)
- Listed weight: 240 lb (109 kg)

Career information
- High school: Rancho Verde (Moreno Valley, California)
- College: Irvine Valley (2009–2010); Cal State San Bernardino (2010–2013)
- NBA draft: 2013: undrafted
- Playing career: 2013–present

Career history
- 2013–2014: Rethymno Aegean
- 2014: HKK Čapljina Lasta
- 2014–2015: Enosis Neon Paralimni
- 2015: Changwon LG Sakers
- 2015: Aries Trikala
- 2015: NLEX Road Warriors
- 2016: BC Nokia
- 2017: Hi-Tech Bangkok City
- 2017–2018: Club Atlético Goes
- 2018: Trotamundos de Carabobo
- 2019: Rain or Shine Elasto Painters
- 2020: Tridents
- 2022: Pioneros de Los Mochis
- 2022: Taurinos de Aragua
- 2023: Pioneros de Los Mochis
- 2023: Soles de Santo Domingo Este
- 2023: Club Trouville
- 2024: La Union de Formosa
- 2024: Plateros de Fresnillo
- 2025: Regatas Corrientes
- 2026: Changhua Pauian BLL
- 2026: Pioneros de Los Mochis
- 2026–present: Santos del Potosí

Career highlights
- 2× CIBACOPA All-Star (2022, 2023); CIBACOPA Slam Dunk Contest champion (2022); Cyprus Basketball League All-Star (2015); 2× First-team All-CCAA (2012, 2013)

Quintin Immanuel Alexander (born April 21, 1990) is an American professional basketball player for Santos del Potosí of the Mexican Liga Nacional de Baloncesto Profesional (LNBP). He played college basketball for Irvine Valley and Cal State San Bernardino.

== High school and college career ==
At Rancho Verde he was named to the all-league first-team while leading his team to a 23–6 record as a senior. His team went 22–7 while he was a junior and won the league title.

In 2008–09 at Irvine Valley College he averaged 9.5 points and 8 rebounds per contest while shooting at a 61.6 percent clip earning him second-team all-league honors.

After a successful high school career, he went to Cal State San Bernardino and in 2010–11, as a sophomore, he played in 23 games with the Coyotes, starting twice. He led the CCAA in FG percentage (608–79-130), ranked 9th in rebounds (6 rpg) and ranked 7th in blocked shots (1 bpg) while averaging 9.8 points per contest. He scored in double figures in 12 games, had two double-doubles: a 14 points and 10 rebounds performance at Cal State East Bay and a 17 points, 14 rebounds game against defending NCAA champion Cal Poly Pomona. He was named CCAA Player of the Week on February 27. He hit all 7 shots in the CSUEB game, second-best FG effort in the CCAA and scored a season-best 23 points against CSU Monterey Bay.

In 2011–12, as a junior, he appeared in all 26 games starting on 21 gaining a reputation as one of the best big men in Division II thanks to his explosive vertical game and difficulty to handle within 10 feet of the basket. He was named first-team All-CCAA and a second-team Daktronics All-West Region averaged 10.6 points and a CCAA-leading 7.9 rebounds a game. During the season, he earned five double-doubles, scored in double figures 14 times and had double-digit rebound games for nine times. He scored a season-high 22 points on 10-of-14 shooting with 13 rebounds against Sonoma State on January 21. He earned national notoriety with an incredible throw-down dunk against Cal State Stanislaus landing him on ESPN's Top 10 Plays of the Day on Valentine's Day, being the second best on that list.

== Professional career ==
After going undrafted in the 2013 NBA draft he signed with Greek side Rethymno Aegean. On January 6, 2014, he left Rethymno and four days later signed with Bosnian team HKK Čapljina Lasta.

After the 2013–2014 season concluded he moved to Cyprus to play with Enosis Neon Paralimni until January 31, 2015, when he left the Cypriot outfit and signed with Korean team Changwon LG Sakers, playing 3 games with them, moving on February 24 to Aries Trikala of Greece. On May 4, he left Aries and signed with NLEX Road Warriors of the Philippine Basketball Association as their A import for the 2015 PBA Governors' Cup.

On August 8, 2016, Alexander signed with BC Nokia in Finland. Alexander was released by BC Nokia on October 17, 2016, after appearing in only three games.

In 2022, Alexander was named an All-Star while playing for Mexican team Pioneros de Los Mochis in the Circuito de Baloncesto de la Costa del Pacífico (CIBACOPA). He also won the Slam Dunk Contest. He repeated as an All-Star in 2023.

== Personal ==
He is the son of Kwame and Olufemi Alexander and majored in sociology. He is married to Ogom Chijindu, who is retired from playing in the women's Legends Football League and appeared on the TV show Basketball Wives.
