= Jannero Pargo =

American basketball player and coach (born 1979)

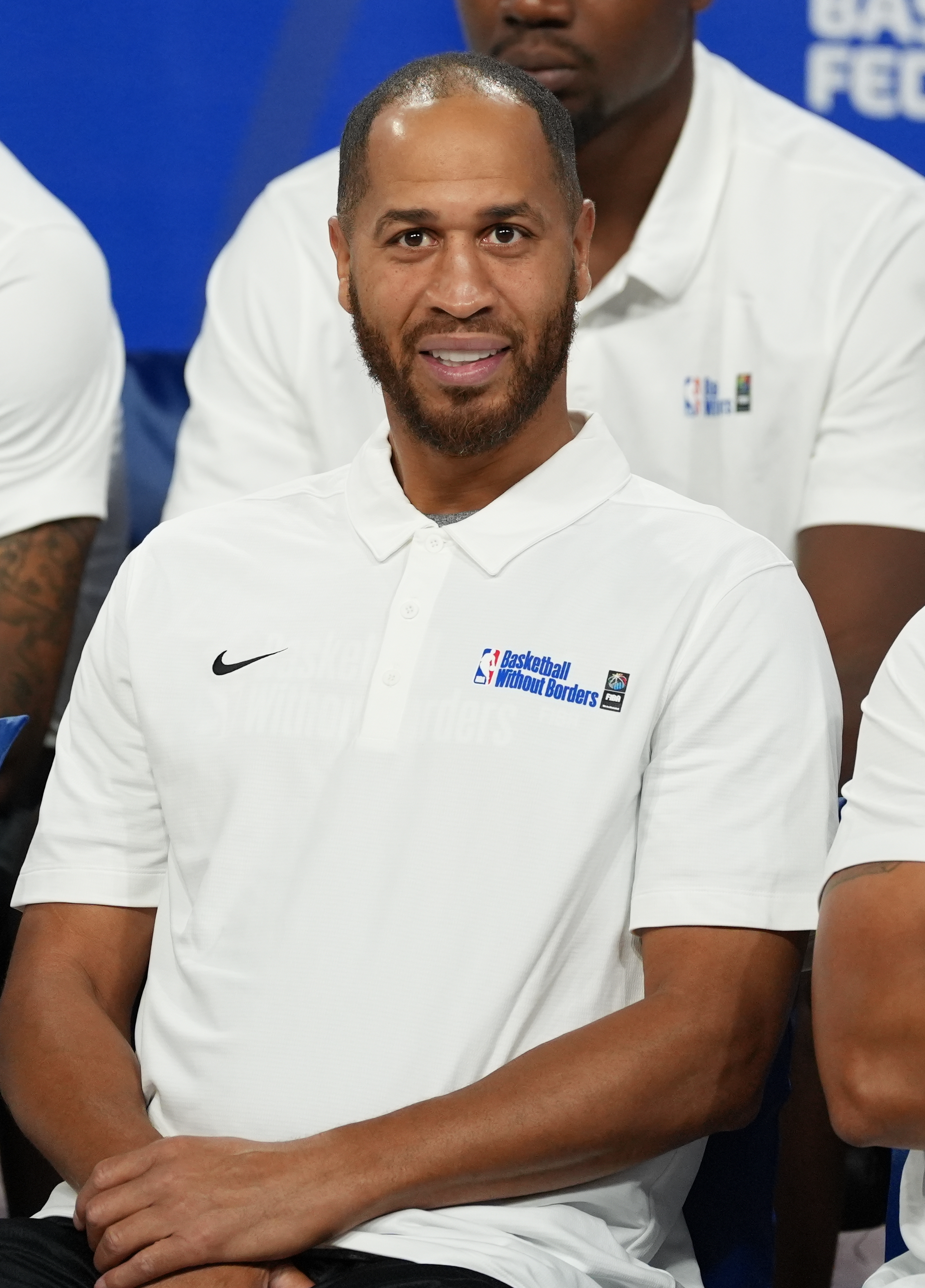
- Pargo in 2026

Indiana Pacers
- Title: Assistant coach
- League: NBA

Personal information
- Born: October 22, 1979 (age 47) Chicago, Illinois, U.S.
- Listed height: 6 ft 1 in (1.85 m)
- Listed weight: 175 lb (79 kg)

Career information
- High school: Paul Robeson (Chicago, Illinois)
- College: Neosho County CC (1998–2000); Arkansas (2000–2002)
- NBA draft: 2002: undrafted
- Playing career: 2002–2017
- Position: Point guard / shooting guard
- Number: 12, 2, 15, 7, 5
- Coaching career: 2017–present

Career history

Playing
- 2002–2004: Los Angeles Lakers
- 2004: Long Beach Jam
- 2004: Toronto Raptors
- 2004–2006: Chicago Bulls
- 2006–2008: New Orleans Hornets (Note: During the 2005–06 and 2006–07 seasons, the team was known as the New Orleans/Oklahoma City Hornets during their temporary relocation to Oklahoma City due to Hurricane Katrina.)
- 2008–2009: Dynamo Moscow
- 2009: Olympiacos
- 2009–2010: Chicago Bulls
- 2011–2012: Atlanta Hawks
- 2012: Washington Wizards
- 2013: Atlanta Hawks
- 2013–2015: Charlotte Bobcats / Hornets
- 2016–2017: Oklahoma City Blue
- Stats at NBA.com
- Stats at Basketball Reference

Jannero Pargo (born October 22, 1979) is an American professional basketball coach and former player who serves as an assistant coach for the Indiana Pacers of the National Basketball Association (NBA). He played college basketball for Neosho County CC and the Arkansas Razorbacks.

== College career ==
Graduating from Chicago's Paul Robeson High School in 1998, Pargo played collegiately for the University of Arkansas after transferring from Neosho County Community College in Chanute, Kansas in 2000. Jennero was known at Arkansas for casually dribbling across the half court line and burying a deep 3-pointer. He produced several 30 point games during his tenure and was ahead of his time by firing up 3-pointers from anywhere on the floor, and hitting them, which has become commonplace in the NBA.

== Professional career ==
=== Early years ===
From 2002 to 2008, Pargo played in the NBA for the Los Angeles Lakers, Toronto Raptors, Chicago Bulls and New Orleans Hornets. During the 2008 playoffs with the Hornets, he garnered attention by coming off the bench for star Chris Paul. He averaged 10.3 points in 12 playoff games and hit big three-point shots in game 7 of the Western Conference Semifinals against the Spurs.

=== Europe ===
After the 2007–08 NBA season, Pargo signed a one-year, $3.8 million contract with the Russian League team Dynamo Moscow. In January 2009, Pargo secured a buyout from his Russian club and signed with the Greek League club Olympiacos. He was released by Olympiacos on May 5, 2009. He averaged 3.5 points and 1.4 assists per game in the Euroleague.

=== Return to the NBA ===
On July 13, 2009, Pargo signed a one-year deal with the Chicago Bulls, bringing him back to the Bulls and the NBA for a second time.

On September 24, 2010, he signed with the New Orleans Hornets. However, he was released before the start of the regular season because of his slow recovery from knee surgery.

On March 20, 2011, Pargo re-signed with the Bulls.

On December 16, 2011, Pargo was waived by the Bulls. On December 20, 2011, Pargo signed with the Atlanta Hawks.

On October 1, 2012, Pargo signed with the Washington Wizards. On November 15, 2012, Pargo was released by the Wizards to make room for Shaun Livingston.

On January 21, 2013, Pargo signed a 10-day contract with the Atlanta Hawks after injuries to Lou Williams and Devin Harris decimated their depth at the point guard position. On February 2, 2013, he signed a second 10-day contract with the Hawks.

On March 14, 2013, Pargo signed a 10-day contract with the Charlotte Bobcats. On March 24, 2013, he signed a second 10-day contract with the Bobcats, and on April 3, 2013, he signed for the remainder of the season. On August 9, 2013, he re-signed with the Bobcats. In April 2014, the Charlotte Bobcats were renamed the Hornets.

On July 25, 2014, Pargo re-signed with the Charlotte Hornets to a reported fully guaranteed one-year, $1.45 million contract. In his 2014–15 season debut on November 9, 2014, he became the first modern-day player to play for both the New Orleans Hornets and Charlotte Hornets franchises.

Pargo's final NBA game was played on December 22, 2014, in a 110 - 82 win over the Denver Nuggets. Pargo recorded 6 points and 1 assist in his final game. For the next 6 weeks, Pargo would not play any games and would eventually be waived by the Hornets on February 4, 2015.

=== NBA Development League ===
On February 2, 2016, Pargo was acquired by the Oklahoma City Blue, and after rehabbing a left ankle sprain, he joined the team on March 31. That night, he made his debut for the Blue in a 122–117 loss to the Rio Grande Valley Vipers, recording 13 points, one rebound and two assists in 16 minutes off the bench. On February 23, 2017, Pargo was waived by the Blue.

=== The Basketball Tournament (TBT) (2017–present) ===
In the summer of 2017, Pargo played in The Basketball Tournament on ESPN for team A Few Good Men (Gonzaga Alumni). He competed for the $2 million prize, and for team A Few Good Men, he scored 21 points in his only game played. Pargo helped take team A Few Good Men to the Super 16 round, where they then lost to Team Challenge ALS 77–60.

== Coaching career ==
On September 15, 2017, Pargo was named as an assistant coach for the Windy City Bulls of the NBA G League., On July 1, 2019, Pargo was named an assistant coach for the Portland Trail Blazers. On August 9, 2021, Pargo was named an assistant coach for the Indiana Pacers.

== NBA career statistics ==
Legend
GP	Games played	GS	Games started	MPG	Minutes per game
FG%	Field goal percentage	3P%	3-point field goal percentage	FT%	Free throw percentage
RPG	Rebounds per game	APG	Assists per game	SPG	Steals per game
BPG	Blocks per game	PPG	Points per game	**Bold**	Career high

=== Regular season ===
Year	Team	GP	GS	MPG	FG%	3P%	FT%	RPG	APG	SPG	BPG	PPG
2002–03	L.A. Lakers	34	0	10.1	.398	.292	**1.000**	1.1	1.1	.4	.1	2.5
2003–04	L.A. Lakers	13	0	4.8	.375	**.500**	—	.5	.8	.2	.0	1.1
2003–04	Toronto	5	0	14.2	.310	.000	—	.8	2.4	**.8**	.2	3.6
2003–04	Chicago	13	1	**26.5**	.429	.377	.852	2.1	**3.6**	.5	**.4**	**13.5**
2004–05	Chicago	32	0	14.2	.385	.348	.739	1.5	2.4	.5	.0	6.4
2005–06	Chicago	57	0	11.3	.373	.379	.810	1.1	1.6	.4	.0	4.8
2006–07	New Orleans/Oklahoma City	**82***	**7**	20.9	.409	.388	.852	**2.2**	2.5	.6	.0	9.2
2007–08	New Orleans	80	5	18.7	.390	.349	.877	1.6	2.4	.6	.1	8.1
2009–10	Chicago	63	5	13.2	.346	.275	.933	1.2	1.4	.5	.0	5.5
2011–12	Atlanta	50	0	13.4	.415	.384	.950	1.5	1.9	.4	.0	5.6
2012–13	Washington	7	0	14.6	.250	.150	**1.000**	.9	2.0	.0	.1	3.0
2012–13	Atlanta	7	0	16.1	.342	.350	**1.000**	1.0	2.7	.4	.0	5.0
2012–13	Charlotte	18	0	16.2	.401	.382	.889	1.2	1.9	**.8**	.1	8.4
2013–14	Charlotte	29	0	8.3	**.441**	.400	.727	.7	1.8	.5	.0	4.7
2014–15	Charlotte	9	0	8.1	.429	.409	**1.000**	.3	.9	.0	.0	4.6
Career		499	18	14.9	.391	.356	.864	1.4	2.0	.5	.1	6.4

=== Playoffs ===
Year	Team	GP	GS	MPG	FG%	3P%	FT%	RPG	APG	SPG	BPG	PPG
2003	L.A. Lakers	11	0	11.7	.333	.267	.750	.8	1.3	.7	.1	2.1
2005	Chicago	5	0	15.2	.353	.406	.600	1.0	2.0	.6	.0	**10.4**
2006	Chicago	5	0	3.8	**.417**	**.600**	**.800**	1.2	.6	.0	.0	3.4
2008	New Orleans	**12**	0	**22.1**	.388	.349	.708	**2.5**	**2.3**	**1.0**	**.2**	10.2
2010	Chicago	2	0	4.0	.200	.500	—	.0	.5	.0	.0	1.5
2012	Atlanta	5	0	9.2	.286	.333	—	1.0	1.2	.4	.0	3.2
2014	Charlotte	1	0	3.0	—	—	—	1.0	1.0	.0	.0	0.0
Career		41	0	13.3	.362	.367	.711	1.4	1.5	.6	.1	5.7

== Personal life ==
Pargo's brother, Jeremy, is also a professional basketball player. Pargo and his wife, Malaysia, lived in Riverwoods, Illinois since 2009, but filed for divorce in 2014.
