= Tamara Bass =

American director and actress

- Occupations: Actress, director, writer
- Years active: 1999–present

Tamara Bass is an American director, writer, producer and actress. She began her career appearing in films Bellyfruit (1999) and Baby Boy (2001). In 2019, Bass made her directing debut with the drama film If Not Now, When?.

== Life and career ==
Bass made her big screen debut appearing in the 1999 independent film Bellyfruit and later guest-starred on Moesha. From 2000 to 2001 she had a recurring role in the ABC drama series, The Fugitive, and in 2001 appeared in the crime drama film, Baby Boy. From 2001 to 2002, Bass had a recurring role in the Fox drama series, Boston Public appearing in 13 episodes. In 2005, Bass made her directing debut with short film Exposure. In 2013, she co-starred opposite Malinda Williams in the made-for-television film, Marry Me for Christmas.

In 2019, Bass co-directed with her friend, Meagan Good, wrote and starred in the drama film If Not Now, When?. The film premiered at the American Black Film Festival and was nominated for the Jury Award for Best Narrative Feature, Best Screenplay and Best Director. It was released by Vertical Entertainment in January 2021. In 2021, Bass directed her second film, the comedy-drama Don't Waste Your Pretty starring Keri Hilson, Deborah Joy Winans, Jasmine Burke and Kaye Singleton. The film that based on Demetria Lucas’ book by the same name premiered on TV One. Later that year, Bass wrote the screenplay for Lifetime drama film Color of Love starring Deborah Joy Winans, and directed Coins Forever starring Essence Atkins, Stephen Bishop and Golden Brooks. In 2022 she directed episode of Tales, and the thriller film Hello for BET+. In 2023, Bass directed Ruined, another thriller for BET+ starring Keri Hilson.

On November 5, 2025, American singer Keri Hilson released the official music video to her single "Again"; the video was directed by Bass.

== Filmography ==
Short film

| Year | Title | Director | Writer | Producer |
|---|---|---|---|---|
| 2005 | Exposure | Yes | Yes | Yes |
| 2008 | Broken | Yes | Yes | Yes |

Feature film

| Year | Title | Director | Writer | Producer |
|---|---|---|---|---|
| 2019 | If Not Now, When? | Yes | Yes | Yes |
| 2021 | Don't Waste Your Pretty | Yes | Yes | No |
| 2021 | Color of Love | No | Yes | Yes |
| 2021 | Coins Forever | Yes | No | No |
| 2022 | Hello | Yes | No | No |
| 2023 | Ruined | Yes | No | No |

Television

| Year | Title | Notes |
|---|---|---|
| 2022 | Tales | Episode "Jesus Walks" |
