= Chyna Layne =

Jamaican American actress

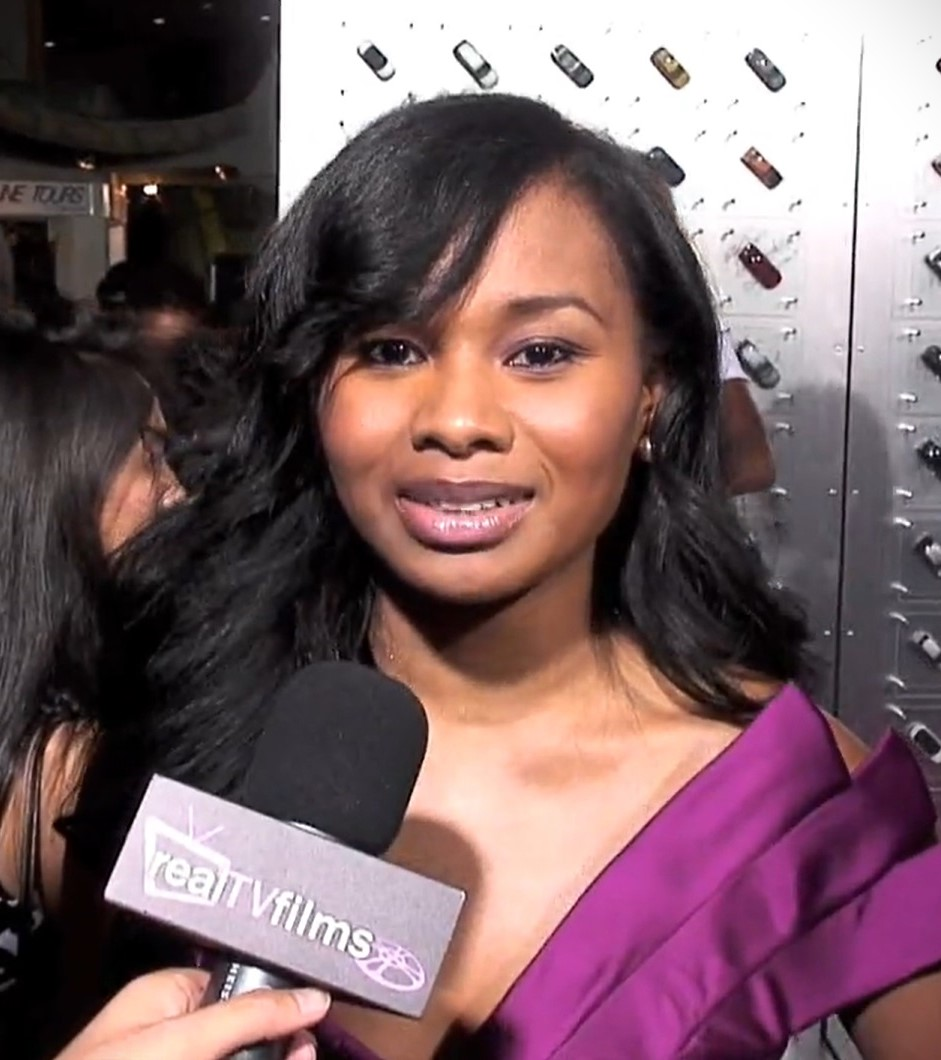
- Layne in 2009
- Born: New York City, New York, U.S.
- Occupations: Actress, producer
- Years active: 2007–present

Chyna Layne is an American actress and producer. She made her screen debut playing the leading role in the 2007 independent drama film A Deeper Love and later co-starred in films Life Support (2007), Cadillac Records (2008) and Precious (2009). From 2017 to 2019, Layne starred as Shemekka Epps in the Netflix comedy-drama series, She's Gotta Have It.

== Life and career ==
Layne was born in New York City. Her father is Jamaican and mother is Filipina. She made her screen debut appearing in the HBO drama film Life Support (2007), and later that year played the leading role and serviced as a producer in the independent drama film A Deeper Love. The following year, Layne appeared in a small role in the biographical drama film Cadillac Records. In 2009 she played the lead in the action comedy film All Screwed Up, and co-starred in the drama film Precious. Since then, Layne appeared in a number of independent and made-for-television films and guest-starred on television series Workaholics and Major Crimes. She also had supporting roles in films Life of Crime (2013) and The First Purge (2018).

From 2017 to 2019, Layne starred as Shemekka Epps in the Netflix comedy-drama series, She's Gotta Have It. In 2023, Layne went to star and executive producer in the Allblk legal drama series, Judge Me Not loosely based on the life of Judge Lynn Toler.

== Filmography ==
=== Film ===
Year	Title	Role	Notes
2007	Life Support	Deyah	Television film
2007	A Deeper Love	Gina	Also producer
2007	Back Stab	Debbie	
2007	STD: Sexually Transmitted Demons	Trina	Short film
2007	Hardrock	Doreen	
2007	DOA (Daughters of America)	-	
2008	Psionics	Honey	
2008	10,000 A.D.: The Legend of a Black Pearl	Mesa	Video
2008	Cash Rules	-	
2008	Cadillac Records	Pot's Girlfriend Juanita	
2009	Precious	Rhonda	
2009	The Eddie Black Story	Kelly	
2009	All Screwed Up	Teenisha	
2010	Left Unsaid	Asia	
2011	Comrades	Kelly	
2011	Five	Ronnie	Television film
2012	Back Then	Young Rochelle	
2012	David E. Talbert Presents: A Fool and His Money	Tabitha	
2013	Life of Crime	Loretta	
2014	Daddy's Home	Janae	Television film
2015	72 Hours	Kandice	
2016	Barbershop: A Fresh Cut	Kayla	
2017	We Are Family	Shee-Lee	
2018	The First Purge	Elsa	
2019	In Broad Daylight	Jordan Boudreaux	Television film

=== Television ===
Year	Title	Role	Notes
2009	FlashForward	Nervous Woman	Episode: "No More Good Days"
2015	Workaholics	Sherry	Episode: "Speedo Racer"
2016	Major Crimes	Deletha	Episode: "Hindsight, Part 1 & 4"
2017–19	She's Gotta Have It	Shemekka Epps	Recurring cast: season 1, main cast: season 2
2021	Dad Stop Embarrassing Me!	Morgan	Episode: "#ThrillaOnTheGrilla"
2022	Tales	Aaliyah Martin	Episode: "Hot in Here"
2022	Power Book III: Raising Kanan	Andrea	Recurring cast: season 2
2023	Judge Me Not	Judge Zelma Jay Johnson	Lead role, also executive producer
2026	The Oval	Dilva Prinn	Lead role
