= All's Fair (2025 TV series) =

American legal drama television series

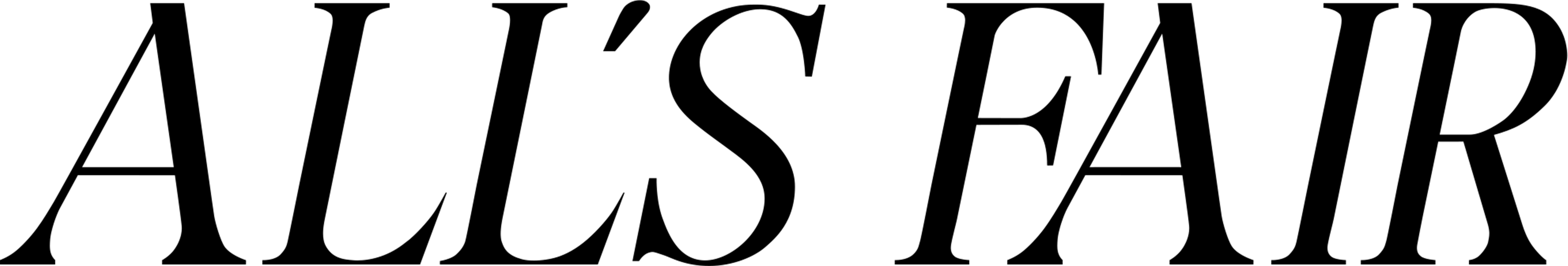
- Genre: Legal drama
- Created by: Ryan Murphy; Jon Robin Baitz; Joe Baken
- Starring: Kim Kardashian; Naomi Watts; Niecy Nash-Betts; Teyana Taylor; Sarah Paulson; Glenn Close; Matthew Noszka; Cauã Reymond
- Country of origin: United States
- Original language: English
- No. of seasons: 2
- No. of episodes: 14

Production
- Executive producers: Ryan Murphy; Kim Kardashian; Kris Jenner; Jon Robin Baitz; Joe Baken; Eric Kovtun; Scott Robertson; Nissa Diederich; Anthony Hemingway; Glenn Close; Naomi Watts; Sarah Paulson; Niecy Nash-Betts; Lyn Greene; Richard Levine; Jamie Pachino; Alexis Martin Woodall; Tanase Popa; Teyana Taylor; Nina Jacobson; Brad Simpson; Louise Shore
- Producer: Danielle Wang
- Cinematography: Blake McClure; Moira Morel
- Running time: 44–52 minutes
- Production companies: Ryan Murphy Productions; Kris Jenner Productions; 20th Television; Color Force

Original release
- Network: Hulu
- Release: November 4, 2025 – present

All's Fair is an American legal drama television series created by Ryan Murphy, and starring Kim Kardashian, Naomi Watts, Niecy Nash-Betts, Teyana Taylor, Sarah Paulson, Glenn Close, Matthew Noszka, and Cauã Reymond. It premiered on November 4, 2025, on Hulu.

All's Fair was widely panned by critics. Despite that, the first season became the most-watched scripted Hulu series debut in three years, and developed a fan following, with some critics referring to it as a "camp classic". In November 2025, All's Fair was renewed for a second season, which premiered on November 4, 2026.

== Premise ==
All's Fair centers on a group of high-skilled female divorce attorneys who depart a male-dominated law firm to establish their own practice. The team specializes in representing women in high-stakes divorce cases. As they manage complex client relationships and contentious legal battles, the attorneys also confront internal tensions and shifting alliances within their firm.

== Cast and characters ==
=== Main ===
- Kim Kardashian as Allura Grant
- Naomi Watts as Liberty Ronson
- Niecy Nash-Betts as Emerald J. Greene-Ball
- Teyana Taylor as Milan
- Sarah Paulson as Carrington "Carr" Lane
- Glenn Close as Dina Standish
- Matthew Noszka as Chase Munroe (season 2; recurring season 1)
- Cauã Reymond as Raul Ortiz (season 2)

=== Recurring ===
- O-T Fagbenle as Reginald "Reggie" Ramirez
- Ed O'Neill as Doug Moore (season 1)
- Armani Barrett as Egypt Greene
- Jamarcus Kilgore as Ezra Greene
- Joshua Suiter as Elijah Greene
- Maury Sterling as Marcus Weller (season 2)
- Noah Fearnley as Brody (season 2)

=== Guest ===
==== Season 1 ====
- Grace Gummer as Grace Henry
- Steven Pasquale as Lionel Lee
- James Remar as Theodore Baskin
- Michael Nouri as Arch Strickland
- Kate Berlant as Devin Samartino
- Judith Light as Sheila Baskin
- Elizabeth Berkley Lauren as Deandre Barber
- Eddie Cibrian as Arthur McPherson
- Jack Davenport as Oliver Draycott
- Jessica Simpson as Lee-Ann Hunt
- Rick Springfield as Tommy Keith
- Hari Nef as Maria Coulatis
- David Paymer as Sam Pollan
- Kevin Connolly as Damien Lord
- Nitya Vidyasagar as Samira Ramesh
- Jennifer Jason Leigh as Cheryl Goodfader
- Paul Adelstein as Matty Goodfader
- Cedric Yarbrough as Det. Ray Delgado
- Ryan Michelle Bathé as Alise
- Lyriq Bent as Lloyd Walton
- Jasika Nicole as Dr. Testa
- Brooke Shields as Juliana Morse
- Lorraine Toussaint as Alberta Dome
- Jason Butler Harner as Sebastian
- Jennifer Morrison as Willow Fallow
- Tamara Taylor as Det. Connie Morrow
- Caitlin McGee as Bethany Morse
- Scott Evans as Eric Dunkin
- Peter MacNicol as Judge Robert DeLancie
- Tessa Ferrer as Ann Ford
- Kathleen Garrett as Dr. Joan Wesson
- Michael Blackson as Bob Bishop

==== Season 2 ====
- Robin Givens as Aphrodite Lovesong
- Dorinda Medley as Loni Everlane
- Angela Zhou as Jamie Stevenson
- Denise Richards as Mrs. Keller
- Grant Show as Mr. Keller
- Kurt Fuller as Winston Bloom
- Margo Martindale as Gloria Bloom
- Jaime Pressly as Crystal
- Ivy Wolk as Reese Calloway
- Nyle DiMarco as Jay Wilson
- Tyler Jacob Moore as Cody

== Episodes ==
Season	Episodes	Originally released	
Season	Episodes	First released	Last released
1	9	November 4, 2025	December 9, 2025
2	8	November 4, 2026	December 2, 2026

=== Season 1 (2025) ===
No. overall	No. in season	Title	Directed by	Written by	Original release date
1	1	"Pilot"	Ryan Murphy	Ryan Murphy & Jon Robin Baitz & Joe Baken	November 4, 2025
Ten years in the past, lawyers Allura Grant and Liberty Ronson leave their misogynistic firm to start their own, taking investigator Emerald Greene with them. Left behind, bitter Carrington Lane tells Dina Standish, all of the women's mentor, that they have become Carr's enemies. In the present, they help two different women with impenetrable prenuptial agreements leave their troubled marriages with considerable cash. Allura's husband of five years, football star Chase Munroe, asks for a divorce. He reveals he has met someone else, but does not disclose that it is Milan, who works at Allura's firm.
2	2	"When We Were Young"	Anthony Hemingway	Ryan Murphy & Jamie Pachino	November 4, 2025
Allura hires Dina as her divorce lawyer, and Carr gloats that Chase has hired her. Deandre Barber, a client conned by her ex-husband and feeling hopeless, leaps over a balcony to her death. Liberty's boyfriend, Reggie Ramirez, proposes to her. Dina confesses to her husband Doug that she kissed another man. Emerald discovers that Chase has been having an affair with Milan. Dina coerces Deandre's ex-husband into making things right to avoid jail. Allura confronts Milan, and learns that she is pregnant with Chase's baby.
3	3	"I Want Revenge"	Anthony Hemingway	Ryan Murphy & Joe Baken	November 4, 2025
Allura learns that Chase is also seeing an ex-sex worker, and takes Milan with her to get tested for sexually transmitted infections. Doug learns that his cancer has progressed, but does not tell Dina. The ladies face off against rock star Tommy Keith, who forced his wife, their client Lee-Ann Hunt, to undergo excessive cosmetic surgeries. Dina and Carr clash in their first meeting about Allura's divorce, and Carr's primary bargaining chips are Allura and Chase's embryos. Despite getting a $100 million settlement, Lee-Ann throws sulfuric acid in Tommy's face. Allura supports Milan, who intends to raise her baby alone. After forging Chase's signature, Allura has herself implanted with both embryos.
4	4	"Everybody Dance Now"	Anthony Hemingway	Lyn Greene & Richard Levine & Joe Baken	November 11, 2025
Emerald is drugged and date raped. She and Allura find themselves across the table from Carr again. Emerald learns that her rapist may have targeted her to get revenge on Dina for his father's suicide. He dies from a gunshot wound, a presumed suicide, but Emerald is still resentful towards Dina.
5	5	"This Is Me Trying"	Uta Briesewitz	Lyn Greene & Richard Levine	November 18, 2025
Carr's realization that her 12-year-old daughter Amabel, like her, has no real friends, triggers her. Liberty decides she does not want to sign a prenup with Reggie, and is unpleasantly surprised when he puts a draft of one in front of her. A client helps her realize that her relationship is more important than paperwork. Carr resists having sex with Chase, but is arrested for driving under the influence on her way home. She joins forces with attorney Alberta Dome. LAPD detective Connie Morrow suspects the women may be involved in the death of Emerald's rapist. Carr goes to her estranged friend Sebastian, Amabel's biological father, and asks for help. Doug finally tells Dina that he is dying.
6	6	"Divorce Is Like a Death"	Uta Briesewitz	Ryan Murphy & Joe Baken	November 25, 2025
Allura and Chase sit down for mediation with their lawyers and Judge Robert DeLancie. Allura learns that she is not pregnant. Carr experiences a moment of sympathy for Allura when she shares about her past. Carr and Alberta leverage Allura and Chase's embryos to demand an unreasonable settlement for Chase that includes a share of the firm. Allura reveals that she implanted the embryos but they did not take. Carr rails about criminal charges, but a sympathetic Chase apologizes to Allura. Emerald manipulates Carr into an unhinged meltdown. Allura and Emerald apologize to Carr for the past, and she agrees to settle the case amicably. Dina is at Doug's bedside as he takes his last breath.
7	7	"Letting Go"	Crystle Roberson	Lyn Greene & Richard Levine	December 2, 2025
Dina mourns Doug, and Carr and Liberty clash. Allura and Chase meet to sign their divorce papers. Carr throws an elegant wake three days later, but Dina has sequestered herself in her bedroom with Doug's body. Chase tries to make amends with Milan, but she is unreceptive. The women, including Carr, help Dina let Doug go. Allura and Chase have sex, and he asks for another chance with her.
8	8	"Oh, Jesus!"	Anthony Hemingway	Lyn Greene & Richard Levine	December 9, 2025
Dina turns down the women's offer to join the firm, but suggests Carr, much to Liberty's chagrin. Chase professes his love to Allura, but she needs time. Though Chase is trying to overcome his sex addiction, he has kinky sex with Carr in her office. Allura and Chase argue. Carr shows up at the firm, styled to look exactly like Allura. The women agree to have her assist them in a mediation as a trial. She impresses everyone, but cannot help needling Allura. Carr's tryst with Chase fizzles out. She vows to destroy the firm from within.
9	9	"Interior Law Offices"	Crystle Roberson	Ryan Murphy & Joe Baken	December 9, 2025
In the run-up to Liberty's wedding, Carr attempts to alienate her from the other women. Emerald discovers that Reggie's finances are extremely precarious. The women, including new advisory partner Dina, vote on bringing Carr into the firm, which ends in a tie. Dina tells Carr that she does not want her to join the firm after all. Dina has recognized Carr's machinations and now realizes that she has always been a sociopath. Carr falls apart. Allura tells Liberty about Reggie, and she calls off the wedding. Carr manipulates Allura into believing that Dina's mind is deteriorating. The police arrive to arrest Dina for the murder of Emerald's rapist.

=== Season 2 (2026) ===
No. overall	No. in season	Title	Directed by	Written by	Original release date
10	1	"The Scorpion Ball"	Anthony Hemingway	Charles Rogers & Juli Weiner	November 4, 2026
11	2	"Going Down"	Anthony Hemingway	Lyn Greene & Charles Rogers	November 4, 2026
12	3	"Thanksgiving: Part 1"	Maggie Kiley	Charles Rogers & Juli Weiner	November 4, 2026
13	4	"Thanksgiving: Part 2"	Anthony Hemingway	Charles Rogers & Juli Weiner	November 11, 2026
14	5	"Liberty Unleashed"	Anthony Hemingway	Charles Rogers & Juli Weiner	November 18, 2026
15	6	"Queens"	TBA	Charles Rogers	November 25, 2026
16	7	"Frenemies"	TBA	Juli Weiner	November 25, 2026
17	8	"Carr Crash"	Anthony Hemingway	Juli Weiner	December 2, 2026

== Production ==
=== Background ===
From 2023 to 2024, Kardashian starred in the twelfth season of American Horror Story as publicist Siobhan Corbyn. Because of Kardashian's involvement with American Horror Story, the series creator, Ryan Murphy, wanted to continue working with her, which led to the series being created and pitched to Kardashian by Murphy, Jon Robin Baitz and Joe Baken in 2023. Parts of the initial pitch meeting with Murphy, Kardashian and her mother, Kris Jenner, were shown in the fifth season of The Kardashians, on May 30, 2024.

=== Development ===
In December 2023, it was announced that Hulu had given a straight-to-series order to a legal drama series created by Murphy, with Kardashian starring as the series protagonist, a divorce lawyer and owner of an all-female law firm. Kardashian committed to feature in and executive produce the series, with Jenner also committing to executive produce.

In July 2024, Halle Berry and Glenn Close joined the series to star and executive produce, and the series was also given the title, All's Fair. Later in July 2024, it was announced that Berry had left the project. In August 2024, it was announced that Sarah Paulson, Naomi Watts, Niecy Nash-Betts and Teyana Taylor would be joining the series to star, with Paulson, Watts, and Nash also executive producing. In September 2024, it was announced that Matthew Noszka would be joining the series. In October 2024, it was announced that Ed O'Neill would be joining the series in a recurring role.

The series is executive produced by Ryan Murphy, Kim Kardashian, Glenn Close, Sarah Paulson, Naomi Watts, Niecy Nash, Jon Robin Baitz, Joe Baken, Jamie Pachino, Lyn Greene, Richard Levine, Anthony Hemingway who was a director, Kris Jenner, Alexis Martin Woodall, Eric Kovtun and Scott Robertson. Production companies involved with the series are Ryan Murphy Productions, Trillium Productions and 20th Television.

In November 2025, Hulu renewed the series for a second season. In September 2026, it was announced that Cauã Reymond would be joining Season 2 as a series regular.

=== Filming ===
The series begin filming in California in October 2024, on a budget of $69.7 million. In July 2024, the series was awarded $14.1 million in tax credits from the California Film Commission. On March 21, 2025, Watts revealed that filming of the first season had been wrapped.

Filming on the second season started in May 2026 and wrapped on August 13, 2026.

== Release ==
The trailer for All's Fair was released on October 8, 2025. Within 24 hours, it garnered 57.3 million views across YouTube and social media, with YouTube accounting for just over 16 million of those views. This surpassed the previous record held by Season 3 of The Kardashians, which had achieved 47.2 million views upon its 2023 release. The first season of All's Fair premiered on November 4, 2025, on Hulu in the United States, and was simultaneously released on the Disney+ Hulu hub. The second season is set to premiere on November 4, 2026, with three episodes.

== Reception ==
=== Viewership ===
All's Fair ranked No. 1 on Hulu's "Top 15 Today" list—a daily updated list of the platform's most-watched titles—following its premiere on November 4. Streaming analytics firm FlixPatrol, which monitors daily updated VOD charts and streaming ratings across the globe, reported that the series was the most-streamed show on Disney+ globally as of November 5. The series became Hulu's most-watched premiere for an original scripted series in three years, attracting approximately 3.2 million viewers globally within three days of release. Hulu announced that content related to All's Fair generated over 7 billion social media impressions and 190 million video views following its debut. Luminate, which measures streaming performance in the United States by analyzing viewership data, audience engagement metrics, and content reach across various platforms, reported that All's Fair recorded 2.61 million hours of viewing time in the United States from October 31 to November 6, ranking as the 15th most-streamed series of the week.

During the second week of its release, from November 7–13, the series ranked 13th overall with 3.85 million hours viewed, according to Luminate. For the week of November 14–20, the series recorded 636,059 views, again placing 13th. By November 20, content tied to All's Fair had accumulated a total of 10 billion social media impressions. The series remained on Hulu's "Top 15 Today" list from its premiere on November 4, 2025, through January 6, 2026.

=== Critical response ===
All's Fair was widely criticized, with many reviewers deeming it one of the "worst television series" ever made. On the review aggregator website Rotten Tomatoes, the series holds an approval rating of 6% based on 34 critic reviews. The website's critics consensus reads, "Too awful to love, too boring to war over." Metacritic gave the series a weighted average score of 17 out of 100 based on 15 critics, indicating "overwhelming dislike".

Angie Han of The Hollywood Reporter wrote that the series was "brain dead", stating that "characters are so thin, their storylines so flimsy and their motives so underbaked that there's no recognizable emotion underlying any of it, and thus no feeling to be provoked by watching it". The Guardian's television critic Lucy Mangan gave the series zero stars out of five, writing that "I did not know it was still possible to make television this bad. I assumed that there was some sort of baseline, some inescapable bedrock knowledge of how to do it that now prevents any entry into the art form from falling below a certain standard. But I was wrong." The review was the paper's 18th zero-star review in its history. Ed Power of The Telegraph gave the series one star, calling the show "a crime against television" and a "mind-bending horror sure to trigger nightmares in the unsuspecting viewer". USA Today's television critic Kelly Lawler called the show "the worst TV of the year", detailing that it was an "unmitigated disaster of [...] outlandish proportions". Ben Dowell of The Times specifically criticized Kardashian's performance, stating that she "must have quite a healthy ego to star in what may well be the worst television drama ever made". Kayleigh Donaldson of TheWrap stated that "it's truly baffling how terrible All's Fair is".

Nick Levine of the BBC noted that certain viewers responded positively to the series' high camp aesthetic and statement fashion. Some critics have dubbed All's Fair a "camp classic," drawing comparisons to series such as And Just Like That... and Emily in Paris. Kannagi Desai of Elle argued that All's Fair redefines femininity by framing beauty rituals as essential to both emotional and professional resilience. She noted that the series "slows everything down," positioning skincare routines as acts of "decompression" rather than vanity, an approach that sharply contrasts with the more frantic, performance-driven femininity seen in Sex and the City. Desai emphasized that All's Fair portrays a form of female power where "competence and care coexist," demonstrating that women can be powerful without resorting to rigid exteriors. While acknowledging criticisms of the show, such as its "blunt" writing and "uneven" performances, she underscored its cultural relevance, highlighting how it resonates with audiences. Desai noted that the key takeaway is that the show has "struck a nerve," offering a version of female empowerment that values self-care and emotional strength over performance.

=== Analysis ===
Miranda Sawyer of The Observer examined the negative reception of All's Fair in relation to its public visibility, arguing that the critical slating functioned as an effective form of publicity. Sawyer noted that the series received multiple zero-star reviews and was labelled by some critics as the "worst TV show of the year," but asserted that the intensity of the backlash generated extensive media coverage rather than discouraging audiences. She described the zero-star reception as a "badge of honour," suggesting that the show's exaggerated dialogue, overt camp sensibility, and reliance on celebrity casting positioned All's Fair for ironic consumption and social media circulation, rather than conventional critical approval. Corinna Mason of Popviewers reported that Kim Kardashian responded to the negative critical reception of All's Fair by engaging with it on social media, reposting and joking about reviews instead of issuing "damage control." Mason described this approach as a "meme-powered promotional cycle," noting that it generated attention for the series and maintained public interest despite largely unfavorable critiques. Louis Staples of Bazaar also highlighted Kardashian's engagement with the discourse, noting that she was "secretly enjoying being back in the cultural fray" and leveraging attention to maintain visibility. He further contextualized the show's reception within a broader pattern of "low art" or culturally dismissed media achieving influence over time, noting parallels to works like Showgirls and the Kardashians' reality series, Keeping Up With the Kardashians. Staples suggested that All's Fair exemplifies the contemporary "attention economy," where even negative engagement can contribute to a series' prominence and cultural impact.

Brahmjot Kaur of E! News interviewed celebrity divorce attorneys Laura Wasser and Julia Rodgers to discuss the accuracy of All's Fair, particularly in its portrayal of family law. Wasser, who represented Kim Kardashian in her divorce and inspired the character Allura Grant, acknowledged that while the show is "entertainment", certain elements, such as the extravagant lifestyles of the characters were exaggerated. She noted that, despite their extensive experience, the characters' luxury private jets and high-end auctions do not reflect the reality of most divorce lawyers' lives. "I don't know where all of that wealth is coming from"," Wasser remarked, adding that most divorce attorneys do not wear the elaborate outfits featured in the show. Nevertheless, both Wasser and Rodgers agreed that All's Fair accurately portrayed some aspects of divorce law, particularly the use of negotiation tactics like leveraging private photos or audio to gain an advantage in settlements. Wasser emphasized that while she does not endorse these tactics, they can be effective in high-net-worth divorces, particularly in California, where divorce filings are public. Rodgers also complimented the series' realistic portrayal of prenuptial agreements, noting that they can protect individuals.

=== Accolades ===
Year	Award	Category	Nominee(s)	Result	Ref.
2025	TVLine Awards	Performer of the Week	Sarah Paulson (for "This Is Me Trying")	Won	
2026	Make-Up Artists & Hair Stylists Guild Awards	Best Contemporary Hair Styling - Television Series, Limited or Movie for Television	Valerie Jackson, Marisa Pinuelas, Suzette Boozer, Linda Flowers, and Sharif Poston	Nominated	
2026	Make-Up Artists & Hair Stylists Guild Awards	Best Contemporary Makeup - Television Series, Limited or Movie for Television	Tierra Richards, Victor Del Castillo, Chloe Sens, Naima Jamal, and Diana Shin	Nominated	
2026	NAACP Image Awards	Outstanding Make-up	Kate Biscoe	Nominated	
2026	NAACP Image Awards	Outstanding Hairstyling	Valerie Jackson	Nominated	
2026	Primetime Emmy Awards	Outstanding Contemporary Hairstyling	Valerie Jackson, Linda Flowers, Sharif Poston, Dimitris Giannetos, Michelle Ceglia (for "Oh, Jesus!")	Nominated	
2026	Primetime Emmy Awards	Outstanding Contemporary Makeup (Non-Prosthetic)	Kate Biscoe, Tierra Richards, Victor Del Castillo, Chloe Sens, Naima Jamal, Diana Shin (for "Oh, Jesus!")	Nominated	
