= Jasmine Burke =

American actress

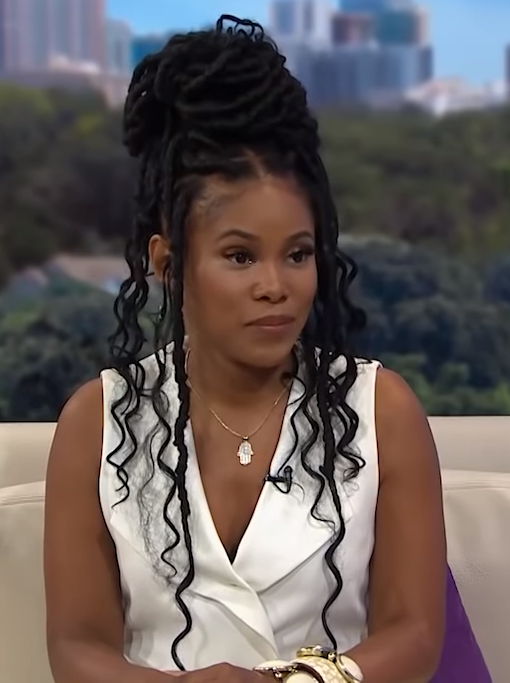
- Burke in 2019
- Born: Atlanta, Georgia, U.S.
- Occupations: Actress, producer
- Years active: 2005–present
- Website: jasmineburke.com

Jasmine Burke is an American actress. She is known for her role as Dr. Christie Johnson in the Bounce TV prime time soap opera, Saints & Sinners (2016–2022). In 2025, Burke joined the recurring role of June Hughes on the CBS soap opera Beyond the Gates, for which she received a Daytime Emmy Award nomination in 2026.

== Life and career ==
Burke was born and raised in Atlanta, Georgia, and studied theatre and business at Kennesaw State University. She began her acting career appearing in small parts in films Daddy's Little Girls (2007), The Secret Life of Bees (2008), and Mississippi Damned (2009). On television, she has appeared in Making The Band 3,The Vampire Diaries, Drop Dead Diva, and Army Wives, as well as VH1 film Drumline: A New Beat. She played the leading role in the 2015 independent drama film Skinned directed by LisaRaye McCoy.

In 2016, Burke was cast alongside Vanessa Bell Calloway, Gloria Reuben and Clifton Powell in the Bounce TV prime time soap opera, Saints & Sinners. The series was the first original drama produced by the African-American-oriented television network Bounce TV and was a ratings success, running for six seasons. Burke also was featured in the 2021 spin-off movie Saints & Sinners Judgment Day. The series ended in 2022. From 2016 to 2017, Burke also had a recurring role in the Fox musical drama series, Star. In 2020 she also starred in the first season of Urban Movie Channel drama series, Double Cross.

In 2021, Burke starred opposite Taryn Manning in the crime-thriller film, Karen, it received negative reviews from critics and five Golden Raspberry Awards nominations. Later that year she starred in the drama film Don't Waste Your Pretty alongside Keri Hilson, Deborah Joy Winans and Kaye Singleton, and the drama film Entanglement opposite Omar Gooding. The following year she starred in the second season of Allblk horror anthology series, Terror Lake Drive. In 2023, Burke starred in the Christmas romantic comedy film, Christmas Holidate, and starred and directed the romantic comedy film, Shamed.

== Filmography ==
=== Film ===
Year	Title	Role	Notes
2007	Daddy's Little Girls	Girl	
2008	Never Back Down	Student	
2008	The Secret Life of Bees	Sugar Girl	
2009	Mississippi Damned	Paula	
2009	Van Wilder: Freshman Year	Molly	Video
2009	Acceptance	Lily	TV movie
2009	Musical Theater of Hope	Shantel	TV movie
2010	Preacher's Kid	Cresha	
2011	Big Mommas: Like Father, Like Son	Drama Queen #2	
2011	Letters to a Father	Angel	Short
2012	Let It Shine	Eb	TV movie
2012	Reckless	Jana Morrison	Short
2012	Hillbilly Highway	Shante	
2013	Restitution	Receptionist/Clerk/Sara	Short
2013	Military Man	Shooter Girl	Short
2013	Emma Mae Tell	Emma Mae	Short
2014	Ride Along	Dispatcher Gina	
2014	Drumline: A New Beat	Tasha Williams	TV movie
2014	Bossip Comedy Series	Shawn	TV movie
2015	Skinned	Jolie	
2015	When I Hold My Ears	Dianne Jones	
2015	A Baby for Christmas	Wilhelmina	TV movie
2016	Brazilian Wavy	Zakia	Short
2016	Addicted to You	Lena Shaw	TV movie
2017	Schooling Life	-	Short
2019	Angrily Ever After	Tia Logan	
2019	The Probe	A.D.A Smith	TV movie
2021	Saints & Sinners Judgment Day	Christie	TV movie
2021	Don't Waste Your Pretty	Aisha	
2021	Entanglement	Robin	
2021	Karen	Imani	
2023	Shamed	Stella Watson	
2023	Christmas Holidate	Holly Harper	
2024	The Probe	A.D.A Monica Smith	
2024	Rumors Salon	Alicia Whitaker	
2024	Let Us Make Eve	Eve	
2025	Yesterday Today Forever	Veronica	
2026	Georgia Peach	Janie	
2026	Deadly Maid	April	

=== Television ===
Year	Title	Role	Notes
2005	Making The Band 3	Herself	Main Cast: Season 2
2008	Somebodies	Tasha	Episode: "Dad-O-Lantern"
2009	Meet the Browns	Tamika	Episode: "Meet the Babies"
2009	The Vampire Diaries	Birdy Mae	Recurring Cast: Season 1
2010	Drop Dead Diva	Lily	Episode: "Bad Girls"
2012	Army Wives	Chelsea Rhodes	Recurring Cast: Season 6
2016–17	Star	Danielle Jackson	Recurring Cast: Season 1
2016–22	Saints & Sinners	Dr. Christie Johnson	Main Cast
2017	Love & Hip Hop: Atlanta	Herself	Episode: "In with the New"
2020	Double Cross	Detective Candice	Main Cast: Season 1
2021	Covenant	Monica Ellison	Episodes: "The Vow - Part 1 & 2"
2024	Kold x Windy	-	Main Cast: Season 2
2025-present	Beyond the Gates	June Hughes	Regular Cast
2026	Beauty in Black	Gina	2 episodes

== Awards and nominations ==
List of awards and nominations
Year	Award	Category	Work	Result	Ref.
2026	Daytime Emmy Award	Outstanding Guest Performer in a Drama Series	Beyond the Gates	Nominated	
