= Walter Thompson-Hernández =

American director (born 1985)

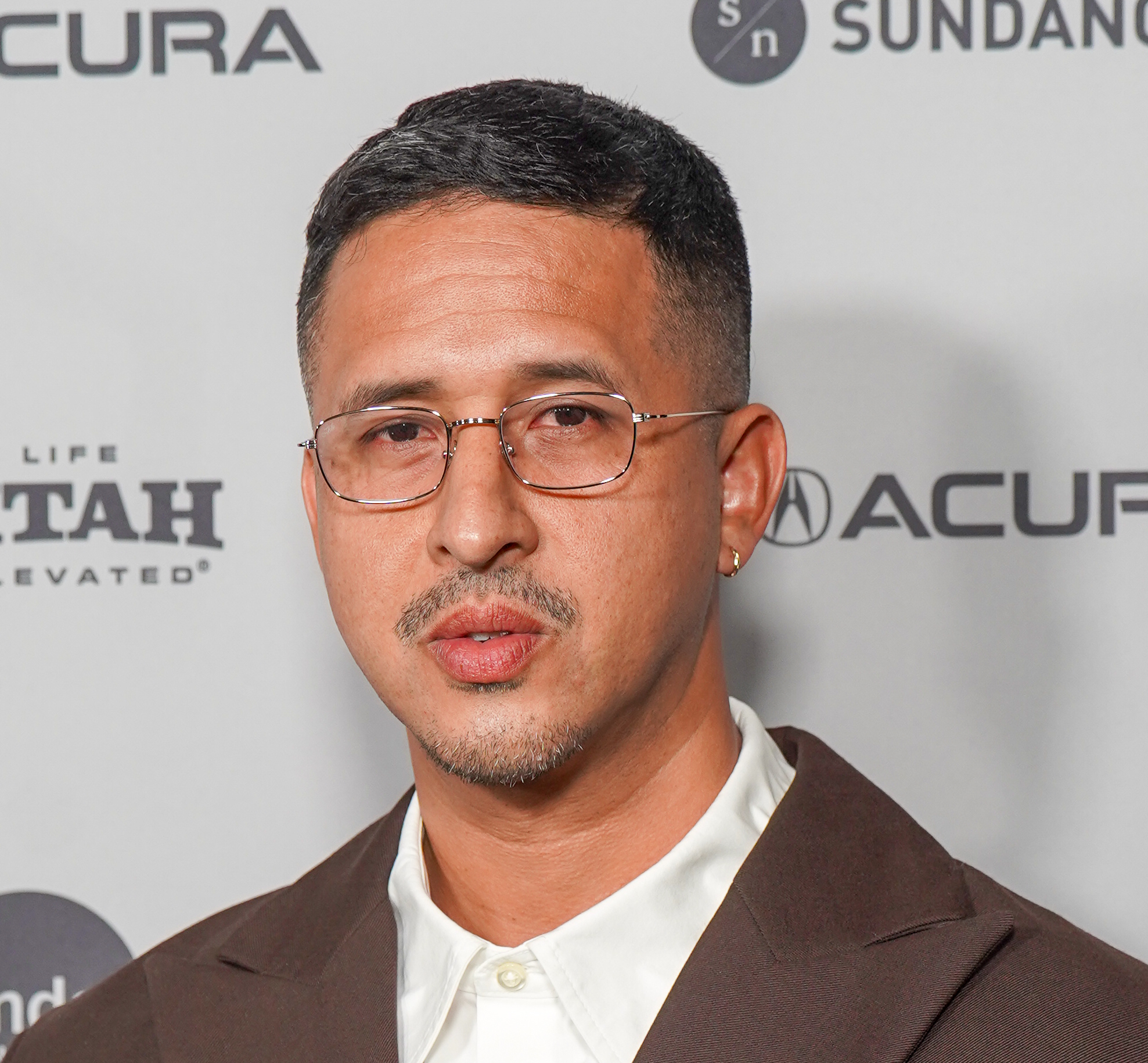
- Thompson-Hernández in 2026
- Born: 1985 (age 40–41); Huntington Park, California
- Education: University of Portland (Bachelor's degree); Stanford University (MA)
- Occupations: Director, screenwriter, journalist, author

Walter Thompson-Hernández (born 1985) is an American director, screenwriter, journalist and author. Thompson-Hernández has written for The New York Times, NPR, The Guardian, Remezcla among others. In 2020, he wrote the book The Compton Cowboys: The New Generation of Cowboys in America's Urban Heartland. He has directed the feature-length films Kites (2025) and If I Go Will They Miss Me (2026).

== Early life and education ==
Thompson-Hernández was born and raised in Huntington Park, California. He is of African American and Mexican descent. He attended the University of Portland, where he played basketball, eventually playing it in Latin America with Caballeros de Culiacan. However, he suffered an injury, and began pursuing storytelling. Thompson-Hernández graduated with a degree in political science. He also attended Stanford University where he received a master's degree in Latin American Studies.

Thompson-Hernández was enrolled in the UCLA César E. Chávez Department of Chicana/o and Central American Studies Ph.D. program for one year before leaving to begin his journalism career.

== Career ==
=== Journalism ===
Thompson-Hernández has written for The New York Times, where he was a multimedia subculture reporter. At The Times, Thompson-Hernández would write about the Compton Cowboys in his The Compton Cowboys: The New Generation of Cowboys in America's Urban Heartland published in 2020, by HarperCollins. His work has additionally been featured in NPR, BuzzFeed, The Guardian and Remezcla.

=== Filmmaking ===
In 2022, Thompson-Hernández directed the short film If I Go Will They Miss Me which had its world premiere at the 2022 Sundance Film Festival where it won the Sundance Film Festival Short Film Jury Award. It was then expanded into a feature-length film of the same name starring J. Alphonse Nicholson and Danielle Brooks, and premiered at the 2026 Sundance Film Festival.

In 2025, Thompson-Hernández directed the documentary Untold: Shooting Guards for Netflix, revolving around an incident by Washington Wizards teammates Gilbert Arenas and Javaris Crittenton. That same year, he made his narrative directorial debut with Kites which premiered at the 2025 Tribeca Festival, where it received a Special Jury Mention for Viewpoints.

== Filmography ==
Documentary film

- Untold: Shooting Guards (2025)

Feature film

Year	Title	Director	Producer	Writer
2025	Kites	Yes	Yes	Yes
2026	If I Go Will They Miss Me	Yes	Yes	Yes
