= Deborah Joy Winans =

American actress

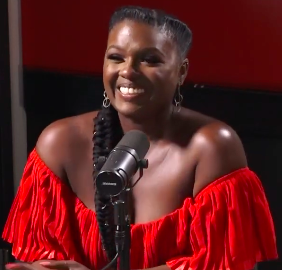
- Winans in 2019
- Born: September 6, 1983 (age 42); Detroit, Michigan, U.S.
- Education: Wayne State University (BFA); California Institute of the Arts (MFA)
- Occupations: Actress, singer
- Years active: 2014–present
- Spouse: Terrence Williams
- Children: 1
- Relatives: Winans family

Deborah Joy Winans (born September 9, 1983) is an American actress and singer, and member of the musical Winans family. She starred as Charity Greenleaf-Satterlee in the Oprah Winfrey Network drama series, Greenleaf.

== Life and career ==
Winans was born in Detroit, Michigan, the daughter of Carvin and Deborah Kerr Winans. She graduated with a BFA degree from Wayne State University. She spent a month in Moscow at the Moscow Art Theatre School for additional training, and received an MFA degree in acting from the California Institute of the Arts. In 2014, she began her acting career appearing in Fragile World, a small film. Later she was cast as her aunt CeCe Winans in the Lifetime television biographical film Whitney, directed by Angela Bassett. Winans later made her stage debut in the musical Born for This: The BeBe Winans Story.

In 2015, Winans was cast in a series regular role in the Oprah Winfrey Network drama series, Greenleaf. She plays Charity Greenleaf-Satterlee, the youngest daughter in the family, who is also the Minister of Music. The series also stars Lynn Whitfield, Keith David, Merle Dandridge, and Kim Hawthorne. The series ended in 2020 after five seasons and 60 episodes. The following year, Winans played the leading role in the Lifetime Christmas film, Color of Love. She starred in the drama film Don't Waste Your Pretty alongside Keri Hilson, Jasmine Burke and Kaye Singleton, and was lead in the Oprah Winfrey Network film, A Sisterly Christmas. In 2023, she starred in the romantic drama film The Final Say for BET+, and had a leading role in the third season of Allblk thriller anthology series, Terror Lake Drive.

== Personal life ==
Winans gave birth to her first child, son Terrence David Williams, with husband Terrence Williams in October, 2021.

== Filmography ==
| Year | Title | Role | Notes |
|---|---|---|---|
| 2014 | Fighting the Battle | Mia | Short film |
| 2014 | Fragile World | Park Goer | |
| 2015 | Whitney | CeCe Winans | Television film |
| 2015-20 | Greenleaf | Charity Greenleaf-Satterlee | Main cast, 60 episodes |
| 2020 | Last Words | Keisha | Short film |
| 2021 | Color of Love | Monica | Television film |
| 2021 | Don't Waste Your Pretty | Jeanné | |
| 2021 | A Sisterly Christmas | Kristina Marshall | Television film |
| 2022 | Hello | Nicole Davenport | |
| 2023 | The Final Say | Valerie | |
| 2023 | Terror Lake Drive | Janice | Series regular |
