= Matthew Noszka =

American fashion model and actor (born 1999)

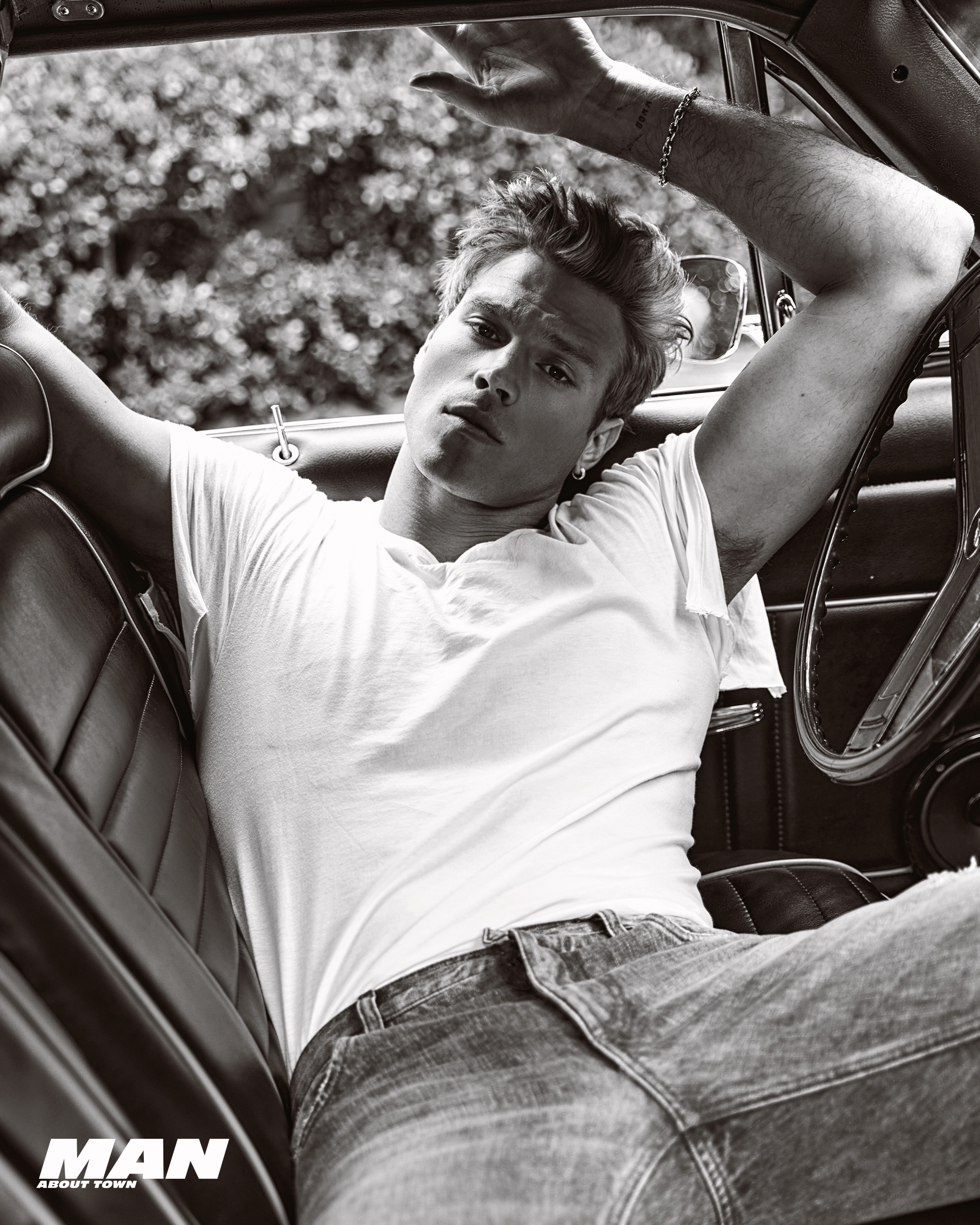
- Born: Matthew Daniel Noszka; October 27, 1992 (age 34); Pittsburgh, Pennsylvania
- Education: Point Park University
- Occupations: Model and actor
- Spouse: Inanna Sarkis (partner)
- Children: 1
- Relatives: Stan Noszka

Matthew Daniel Noszka (born October 27, 1992) is an American model and actor.

== Early life ==
Noszka was raised in Pittsburgh, Pennsylvania, and relocated to New York City. He attended Chartiers Valley High School in Pittsburgh, then attended Point Park University on a basketball scholarship, where he pursued a degree in business. Once the spring term of his junior year ended, Noszka started working odd jobs such as construction for the duration of the summer break. In 2014, after he successfully built a deck alongside his family friend Mike, he posted a photo on Instagram. After posting the photo, Noszka was contacted by a representative from an agency based in New York City. Within days, Noszka was booked for a Nike modeling gig.

== Modeling ==
Noszka has modeled for Nike, Calvin Klein, Hugo Boss, Tom Ford, Ralph Lauren, Versace, Moncler, Benetton, and Levi's. In 2015, he walked the runway for H&M. In 2016, Vogue magazine named him one of the 50 fittest boys.

== Personal life ==
Noszka is an avid basketball player. His grandfather, Stan Noszka, was a former professional basketball player for the Boston Celtics.

In May 2020, he announced through social media that his girlfriend of three years Inanna Sarkis was six months pregnant with their first child, a baby girl. On September 12, 2020, she gave birth to their daughter, Nova.

=== Motorcycle crash ===
In early 2018, Noszka had a severe motorcycle accident, shattering his femur, forearm and tibia, tearing both anterior cruciate ligaments and losing part of the bone on his hips. After 22 surgeries, Noszka now has titanium rod on the wrist, elbow and femur.

== Filmography ==
=== Film ===
Year	Title	Role	Notes
2019	Let It Snow	JP Lapierre	
2023	Perfect Addiction	Jax	
2023	No Hard Feelings	Jason	
2025	Marked Men: Rule + Shaw	Nash Donavan	Post-production

=== Television ===
Year	Title	Role	Notes
2017	Tales	Brody	Episode: "F*ck the Police"
2018–19	Star	Jackson Ellis	Recurring role (season 2); main role (season 3)
2025–present	All's Fair	Chase Munroe	Recurring role (season 1); main role (season 2)
