= Double Cross (TV series) =

- Genre: Crime drama
- Created by: Christel Gibson
- Written by: Christel Gibson
- Starring: Ashley A. Williams; Jeff Logan; Jasmine Burke; Erica Burton; Darrin Dewitt Henson; Faith Malonte; Tremayne Norris; Judi Johnson; Candice Van Beauty; Lisa Renee Marshall; Redaric Williams; Erica Burton
- Country of origin: United States
- Original language: English
- No. of seasons: 5
- No. of episodes: 30

Production
- Executive producers: Christel Gibson; Howard Gibson; Keith L. Craig; Brett Dismuke; Nikki Love
- Producer: Tasha Coates
- Running time: 42 minutes
- Production company: Dem Gibsons Films

Original release
- Network: Allblk
- Release: May 20, 2020 – February 22, 2024

Double Cross is an American crime drama television series created by Christel Gibson. The series follows the twins (played by Ashley A. Williams and Jeff Logan) who are trying to save women in their neighborhood from a sex trafficking ring.

The series premiered on the streaming service Allblk on May 20, 2020. On July 13, 2020, the series was renewed for a second season, which premiered on January 14, 2021. The third season premiered on February 3, 2022. On June 16, 2023, the series was renewed for a fifth and final season, which premiered on January 18, 2024.

== Cast and characters ==
- Ashley A. Williams as Erica Cross
- Jeff Logan as Eric Cross
- Jasmine Burke as Detective Candice (season 1)
- Erica Burton as Gi (season 1)
- Darrin Dewitt Henson as Detective Ryan
- Faith Malonte as Nurse Brian
- Tremayne Norris as Dr. Cintron Morris
- Judi Johnson as Robin Cross
- Candice Van Beauty as Tanya
- Lisa Renee Marshall as Nurse Rachel
- Redaric Williams as Deandre (seasons 3–4)
- James Jamison Jr. as Benny (seasons 4–5)
- Zimzon Zion as Detective Tate (season 5)
