= Tales (TV series) =

2017–2022 anthology television series

- Genre: Anthology; Musical; Drama
- Created by: Irv Gotti
- Country of origin: United States
- Original language: English
- No. of seasons: 3
- No. of episodes: 28

Production
- Executive producers: Irv Gotti; Ron Robinson; Robert Munic
- Producers: Ron Robinson; Joy Kecken; Darcell Lawrence; John Bryant; James Seppelfrick; Keith Neal; Eric Tomosunas
- Running time: 42 minutes
- Production company: Visionary Ideas

Original release
- Network: BET
- Release: June 27, 2017 – September 27, 2022

Tales is an American anthology television series created by Irv Gotti. The series premiered on BET on June 27, 2017. It was renewed for a second season, which premiered on July 2, 2019. In March 2021, BET renewed the series for a third season, which premiered on August 9, 2022.

== Plot ==
Each episode tells a new "tale" inspired by past and current songs that are turned into stories.

== Cast ==
- Tristan Wilds as Kayron (episode: "Deep Cover", season 2)
- Justine Skye as Violet (episode: "Bodak Yellow", season 2)
- Boris Kodjoe as prosecutor Ray Vance (episode: "F**k the Police", season 1)
- Ben Vereen as Harry (season 2)
- Jennifer Freeman as Ashley (episode: "I Got a Story to Tell", season 1)
- Lance Gross as Reggie (episode: "Trap Queen", season 1)
- Rhyon Nicole Brown as Germaine (episode: "99 Problems", season 1)
- Debbi Morgan as Clarice (season 2)
- DeRay Davis as Davenport (episode: "Slippery", season 2)
- Roger Guenveur Smith as Tobias McCall (episode: "Fight the Power", season 3)
- Woody McClain as Slim (episode: "I Got a Story to Tell", season 1)
- Matthew Noszka as Brody Wilson (episode: "F**k the Police", season 1)
- Romeo Miller as Rider (episode: "Bodak Yellow", season 2)
- Bre-Z as Ty (episode: "Children Story", season 1)
- Hassan Johnson as Dougie (episode: "Deep Cover", season 2)
- Grace Byers as Edie (season 2)
- Elise Neal as Detective Beatriz (episode: "I Got a Story to Tell", season 1)
- Laila Odom as Renee (episode: "Renee", season 3)
- Jim Jones as Taggert (episode: "All I Need", season 1)
- Walnette Marie Santiago as Angelica (season 2)
- Demetrius Shipp, Jr. as Kenny (episode: "All I Need", season 1)
- Dawn Halfkenny as Officer Cooper (episode: "Slippery", season 2)
- Draya Michele as Viveca (episode: "Brothers", season 2)
- Rick Ross as Zeke (episode: "My Life", season 2)
- Peyton Alex Smith as Miles (episode: "99 Problems", season 1)
- MC Lyte as Detective Makena Daniels (episode: "Cold Hearted", season 1)
- Bella Thorne (season 2)
- Keith Powers as Amari "Gutta" Anderson (episode: "Cold Hearted", season 1)
- Lex Scott Davis as Angie (episode: "You Got Me", season 1)
- Sinqua Walls as Marcus (episode: "All I Need", season 1)
- Michelle Mitchenor as Crystal (season 1)
- Sean Nelson as prosecutor Stokely Overton (episode: "Fight the Power", season 3)
- Elijah Kelley as Paul (episode: "Brothers", season 2)
- Christian Robinson as Lil Tank (episode: "Cold Hearted", season 1)
- Charles Malik Whitfield as Blue (episode: "99 Problems", season 1)
- Steve Harris as Officer McBride (episode: "Slippery", season 2)
- Morocco Omari as Chris (season 2)
- Shayla Love as Trina (season 1)
- Thomas Q. Jones as Jimmy (episode: "Brothers", season 2)
- Bri Collins as Camille King (episode: "Act Up", season 3)
- Nafessa Williams as Jenny Davis (season 1)
- Clifton Powell as Bob Davis (episode: "F**k the Police", season 1)
- J. Alphonse Nicholson as Ricky (seasons 1—3)
- Tami Roman as Silk (episode: "All I Need", season 1)
- Jharrel Jerome as Deacon (episode: "Children's Story", season 1)
- Boogiie Byrd as Frank (episode: "Slippery", season 2)

== Episodes ==
Season	Episodes	Originally released	
Season	Episodes	First released	Last released
1	8	June 27, 2017	November 25, 2017
2	10	July 2, 2019	September 3, 2019
3	10	August 9, 2022	September 27, 2022

=== Season 1 (2017) ===
No. overall	No. in season	Title	Directed by	Written by	Original release date	Prod. code	U.S. viewers (millions)
1	1	"F**k the Police"	Irv Gotti	Story by : Irv Gotti; Teleplay by : Sherman Payne & Joy Kecken	June 27, 2017	101	0.544
Cast: Boris Kodjoe, Matthew Noszka, Chet Hanks, Nafessa Williams, Jessica Parker Kennedy, Parker Sack, Tyrin Turner and Clifton Powell
2	2	"Cold Hearted"	Benny Boom	Denise Harkavy	July 11, 2017	102	0.451
Cast: Keith Powers, Christian Robinson, Michelle Hayden, Sean Baker, Maino, Clayton Landey and MC Lyte
3	3	"A Story to Tell"	Jessy Terrero	Story by : Irv Gotti; Teleplay by : Yule Caise & Joy Kecken	July 18, 2017	103	0.432
Cast: Jennifer Freeman, Woody McClain, Elise Neal, Rico Ball, DC Young Fly and Lil Duval
4	4	"Trap Queen"	Benny Boom	Sara Feinberg & Joy Kecken	October 10, 2017	104	1.039
Cast: Lance Gross, Michelle Mitchenor, Jessica Parker Kennedy, Tammy Rivera and Woody McClain
5	5	"Children's Story"	Erik White	Sherman Payne	October 17, 2017	105	0.539
Cast: Bre-Z, Jharrel Jerome, Tonea Stewart and Rick "Slick Rick" Walters
6	6	"99 Problems"	Tasha Smith	Story by : Joy Kecken; Teleplay by : Marcus J. Guillory	October 24, 2017	106	0.542
Cast: Peyton Alex Smith, Rhyon Nicole Brown, Mike Pniewski, Jerod Haynes, Charles Malik Whitfield and Tyra Ferrell
7	7	"You Got Me"	Erica A. Watson	Joy Kecken	October 31, 2017	107	0.440
Cast: Sinqua Walls, Lex Scott Davis, Shayla Love and Alvester Martin III
8	8	"All I Need"	Irv Gotti	Adam Wiesen & Patrick Coker	November 25, 2017	108	0.706
Cast: Demetrius Shipp Jr., Kyndall Ferguson, Sean Baker, John Bryant, Jim Jones and Tami Roman

=== Season 2 (2019) ===
No. overall	No. in season	Title	Directed by	Written by	Original release date	Prod. code	U.S. viewers (millions)
9	1	"Brothers"	Irv Gotti	Story by : Irving Lorenzo; Teleplay by : Robert Munic	July 2, 2019	201	0.342
Cast: Thomas Q. Jones, Elijah Kelley and Draya Michele
10	2	"Slippery"	Erik White	Story by : Irving Lorenzo; Teleplay by : Marcus J. Guillory	July 9, 2019	202	0.451
Cast: Johnell Young, Dawn Halfkenny, Jamila Thompson, Steve Harris, Irv Gotti, DeRay Davis and Boogiie Byrd
11	3	"My Life"	Tasha Smith	Leah Keith & Robert Munic	July 16, 2019	203	0.592
Cast: Morocco Omari, Grace Byers, Debbi Morgan and Rick Ross
12	4	"Deep Cover"	Robert Munic	Michael Cobian	July 23, 2019	204	0.435
Cast: Tristan Wilds, Hassan Johnson, Chris Greene, Walnette Marie Santiago, Gonzalo Menendez and Louis Ferreira
13	5	"Bodak Yellow"	Ellie Foumbi	Story by : Irving Lorenzo; Teleplay by : John Barcheski & Robert Munic	July 30, 2019	205	0.444
Cast: Romeo Miller, Justine Skye, Monique MoMo Gonzalez, Danny Pardo, Rasheeda, Lil Duval, Tyla Harris and Lani Blair
14	6	"XO Tour Lif3"	Irv Gotti	Story by : Irving Lorenzo; Teleplay by : Adam Wiesen & Patrick Coker	August 6, 2019	206	0.267
Cast: Guyviaud Joseph, Brandon Thomas Lee, Bella Thorne, Britney Atkins, Devoun Dallas Stewart, Parker Sack, Emily Huff, Juwan Chapman, Robert Praigo and Debra Stipe
15	7	"My Mind Playing Tricks On Me"	Joshua Bulter	Story by : Irving Lorenzo; Teleplay by : Larry D. Spivey	August 13, 2019	207	0.506
Cast: Mo McRae, Brad T. Jordan, Trayce Malachi, Jaxon Rose Moore, Ric Reitz, Inanna Sarkis, Deja Dee, Alexandra Wright, Nikka Duarte, Charles Lawlor, Ana Mackenzie and Greg Clarkson
16	8	"I Gave You Power"	Benny Boom	Story by : Irving Lorenzo; Teleplay by : Adam Wiesen & Patrick Coker & Larry D. Spivey & Benjamin Moore	August 20, 2019	208	0.472
Cast: Antoine Harris, Little JJ, Isaiah Smith, Brii Renee', Rhonda Saunders, Kjay Saifullah, Jessica Fontaine and Jaxon Rose Moore
17	9	"Ex-Factor"	Leah Benavids	Leah Benavids	August 27, 2019	209	0.446
Cast: Tyler Lepley, KJ Smith, Amin Joseph, Kaye Singleton, Chase Alexander Jackson, Jaidi Ventura and C.J. Lindsey
18	10	"Moonlight"	Bryant Barber	Story by : Irving Lorenzo; Teleplay by : Trevor Vandelac	September 3, 2019	210	0.377
Cast: Uriel J. Winfree III, Birgundi Baker, Odiseas Georgiadis, Chase Anderson, Monet A. Chandler, Maurie A. Chandler, Dwayne A. Thomas, Charmin Lee and Adrienne Ballenger

=== Season 3 (2022) ===
No. overall	No. in season	Title	Directed by	Written by	Original release date	Prod. code	U.S. viewers (millions)
19	1	"Fight the Power"	Ya'Ke Smith	Larry "Legend" Spivey	August 9, 2022	301	0.348
Cast: Roger Guenveur Smith, Michael Beach, Sean Nelson, E. Roger Mitchell and Marlanna Evans
20	2	"Renee"	Leon Lozano	Story by : Leah Keith; Teleplay by : Leah Keith & Patrick Coker & Adam Wiesen	August 16, 2022	302	0.427
Cast: Romeo Brown and Laila Odom
21	3	"Act Up"	Irv Gotti	Story by : Irv Gotti; Teleplay by : Patrick Coker & Adam Wiesen	August 23, 2022	303	0.328
Cast: Lawrence H. Robinson, Bri Collins, Bria Myles and Deja Ware
22	4	"Hot in Here"	Terri J. Vaughn	Teleplay by : Tyree Elaine; Story by : Tyree Elaine & Sonny Lorenzo	August 30, 2022	304	0.330
Cast: Chyna Layne and Jeremy Denzel
23	5	"C.R.E.A.M."	Patrick Coker	Teleplay by : Larry "Legend" Spivey & Patrick Coker; Story by : Sonny Lorenzo	September 6, 2022	305	0.317
Cast: Tobias Truvillion and Lawrence Adimora
24	6	"Put It On Me"	Irv Gotti	Teleplay by : Brittney Atkins & Patrick Coker & Adam Wiesen; Story by : Irv Gotti	September 13, 2022	306	0.362
Cast: Ja Rule and Jonetta Kaiser
25	7	"Ms. Jackson"	Robin Givens	Patrick Coker and Adam Wiesen	September 13, 2022	307	0.315
Cast: Antonique Smith, Hayley Law and Donna Biscoe
26	8	"Murder She Wrote"	Erik White	Teleplay by : Patrick Coker & Adam Wiesen; Story by : Irv Gotti	September 20, 2022	308	0.400
Cast: Ajiona Alexus, Leland B. Martin and Marvin Jones III
27	9	"Jesus Walks"	Tamara Bass	Teleplay by : Darcell Lawrence & Larry "Legend" Spivey; Story by : Darcell Lawrence & Rhonda Baraka	September 20, 2022	309	0.402
Cast: Briyana Guadalupe, Redaric Williams, and J. Alphonse Nicholson
28	10	"Survival of the Fittest"	Tim Folsome	Marcus J. Guillory	September 27, 2022	310	0.332
Cast: Kyla Pratt and Jordan Calloway
