= Judge Me Not =

- Genre: Legal drama
- Created by: Lynn Toler
- Starring: Chyna Layne; Javon Terrell; Terrence Green; Jonathan Chase; Gena Shaw; Bonita Brisker
- Composer: Jamie Coleman
- Country of origin: United States
- Original language: English
- No. of seasons: 1
- No. of episodes: 8

Production
- Executive producers: Lynn Toler; Gieava Stinchcomb; James Seppelfrick; Chyna Layne; Nikki Love; Brett Dismuke
- Running time: 42 minutes
- Production companies: Swirl Films; AMC Networks

Original release
- Network: Allblk
- Release: May 25, 2023 – present

Judge Me Not is an American legal drama television series created and executive produced by Judge Lynn Toler and loosely based on her life. The series stars Chyna Layne as Judge Zelma Jay Johnson, who wins a judicial seat at the age of 31. It also starring Javon Terrell, Terrence Green, Jonathan Chase, Gena Shaw and Bonita Brisker. The series produced by Swirl Films and AMC Networks.

The series premiered on the streaming service Allblk on May 25, 2023, and later on debuted on We TV.

It is a story of a young Black woman named Zelma Jay Johnson who struggles with mental health issues, a ludicrous family, and a volatile love life all while taking on her new role as a judge in a city court full of outrageous characters both in front of and behind the bench.

== Cast and characters ==
=== Main ===
- Chyna Layne as Judge Zelma Jay Johnson
- Javon Terrell as Daryl Bledsoe
- Terrence Green as Michael Johnson
- Jonathan Chase as Martin Allen
- Gena Shaw as Barbara Lester
- Bonita Brisker as Jean

=== Recurring ===
- Ben Bladon as Larry Steele
- Allyson Rochelle as Judge Ruth Spangler
- Malena Cunningham Anderson as Yvonne Johnson
- Chuck Ashworth as Jim Grimes
- Charles Black as Howard Graves
- Amber Reign Smith as Neisha Towers
- Melissa Yu as Melanie
- Terry Allen as Tavon Vaunt
- Jeremy Anderson as Andre Howard
- Margo Graff as Denise
- Durrell Lyons as Andrew
- Patti Mactas as Lily Steele
- Dawn Raven as Tawanda
- Jasmine Sargent as Tanesha
- Craig Elliott Williams as Prosecutor Meeks
