= Untold: Shooting Guards =

2025 American documentary film

- Promotional poster
- Directed by: Walter Thompson-Hernández
- Starring: Gilbert Arenas; Javaris Crittenton
- Edited by: Jake Torchin
- Distributed by: Netflix
- Release date: May 6, 2025
- Country: United States
- Language: English

Untold: Shooting Guards is a 2025 American sports documentary film directed by Walter Thompson-Hernández. The film was released by Netflix on May 6, 2025, as part of the fifth volume of films in the Untold series. The film chronicles the infamous 2009 incident in which Washington Wizards teammates Gilbert Arenas and Javaris Crittenton drew firearms during a heated locker-room argument and follows the personal tragedies and career-altering consequences that followed.
