= Ruined (film) =

Thriller film by Tamara Bass

- Directed by: Tamara Bass
- Written by: Michelle Valentine
- Produced by: Garrett Mock; Maggie Mock
- Starring: Keri Hilson; Chris Warren; Annie Ilonzeh; Julian Horton
- Cinematography: Daniel Friedberg
- Edited by: Kieran Healy
- Production companies: Mock Yeah Productions; Red Hippo Productions; BET Films
- Distributed by: BET+
- Release date: August 17, 2023
- Running time: 93 minutes
- Country: United States
- Language: English

Ruined is an American psychological thriller film written by Michelle Valentine and directed by Tamara Bass. The film stars Keri Hilson, Chris Warren, Annie Ilonzeh, and Julian Horton. The film was released by BET+ on August 17, 2023.

== Plot ==
The film follows couple Olivia “Liv” Richards (Annie Ilonzeh) and Landon (Chris Warren) as they hit a rough patch in their 10-year marriage. Olivia decides to consult with a marriage therapist, Dr. Alexis Torres (Keri Hilson) who had a previous relationship with her husband before she met him.

== Cast ==
- Keri Hilson as Dr. Alexis Torres
- Chris Warren as Landon Richards
- Annie Ilonzeh as Olivia “Liv” Richards
- Julian Horton as Jayce
- Cassi Maddox as Charlotte
- Jason MacDonald as Mark
- Jenna D'Angelo as Detective
