= Jonathan Chase (actor) =

American actor

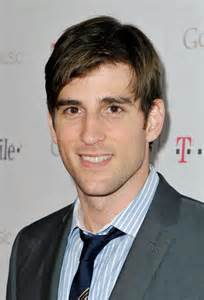
- Occupation: Actor
- Years active: 2002–present

Jonathan Chase is an American actor. He first portrayed Cash on the UPN comedy series One on One (2005–2006) during its final season and has also appeared in the films including The Gingerdead Man (2005), Another Gay Movie (2006), Dead Tone (2007), Eagle Eye and Ring of Death (both in 2008); Watching the Prey and Always and Forever (both in 2009); Strawberry Summer (2012), A Madea Christmas (2013), and How to Train Your Husband (2020). Then Chase even had other television roles in other sitcoms, including Michael Strathmore on the Cinemax sitcom Chemistry (2011), Phil on the Disney Channel sitcom Shake It Up (2013), Sam Parker on the OWN sitcom Tyler Perry's Love Thy Neighbor (2013–2017), Alan on the Paramount sitcom American Woman (2018), Brian Bender on the Nickelodeon sitcom Henry Danger (2018–2020), and Martin Allen on the Allblk sitcom Judge Me Not (2023) and also in the 2011 action-adventure video game L.A. Noire where he provided the voice of Patrick Connolly.

== Life and career ==
In New York City, Chase trained with the Upright Citizens Brigade, strengthening his improvisation skills and comic timing.

In 2009, Chase had a minor role in the film Gamer, as the unnamed character "Geek Leader". He also voiced Patrick Connolly in the 2011 video game L.A. Noire, developed by Rockstar Games.

Chase portrayed Sam Parker in the Oprah Winfrey Network sitcom Love Thy Neighbor, which premiered on May 29, 2013, and played Alan in the 2018 series American Woman.

== Filmography ==
Film
| Year | Title | Role | Notes |
|---|---|---|---|
| 2002 | Corporate Dawgz | Jon Brown | Short film |
| 2005 | The Baker's Dozen | 'Brick' Fields | Short film |
| 2005 | The Gingerdead Man | 'Brick' Fields | |
| 2006 | Another Gay Movie | Jarod | |
| 2007 | Dead Tone | Brandon | |
| 2008 | Backwoods | Tom | Television film |
| 2008 | Knight Rider | Kevin | Television film |
| 2008 | Superhero Movie | Onlooker #1 | |
| 2008 | Ring of Death | Lancer | Television film |
| 2008 | Eagle Eye | Suited Agent | |
| 2009 | Watching the Prey | Scott Carrington | |
| 2009 | Gamer | Geek Leader | |
| 2009 | Always & Forever | James Mitchell | Television film |
| 2011 | Dorfman in Love | Daniel Dorfman | |
| 2012 | Strawberry Summer | Gregg Marks | Television film |
| 2013 | A Madea Christmas | Alfred | |
| 2014 | Audrey | Gene | |
| 2020 | How to Train Your Husband | Justin James | Television film |

Television
| Year | Title | Role | Notes |
|---|---|---|---|
| 2004 | Monk | College Boy #1 | Episode: "Mr. Monk Takes His Medicine" |
| 2004 | Oliver Beene | Chad | Episode: "Catskills" |
| 2005 | Medium | Cowboy | Episode: "The Other Side of the Tracks" |
| 2005–2006 | One on One | Cash Bagan | 22 episodes |
| 2007 | Veronica Mars | Josh Barry | 2 episodes |
| 2008 | Monk | Living Statue | Episode: "Mr. Monk Goes to the Bank" |
| 2008 | Eli Stone | Will Sonneborn | Episode: "Should I Stay or Should I Go?" |
| 2009 | Leverage | Randy Retzing | Episode: "The Snow Job" |
| 2009 | Roommates | Eric | Episode: "The Break In" |
| 2009 | CSI: NY | Brian Hamilton | Episode: "It Happened to Me" |
| 2010 | Svetlana | Sergeant Stokley | Episode: "Recession Special" |
| 2011 | CSI: Crime Scene Investigation | Jeff | Episode: "Man Up" |
| 2011 | The Defenders | EMT Jason | Episode: "Noland v. Galloway Pharmaceuticals" |
| 2011 | Svetlana | Cop | Episode: "Narnia" |
| 2011 | Chemistry | Michael Strathmore | 13 episodes |
| 2012 | The Mentalist | Sandy Bauer | Episode: "Cheap Burgundy" |
| 2013 | Victorious | Dave | Episode: "Brain Squeezers" |
| 2013 | Shake It Up | Phil | 4 episodes |
| 2013–2017 | Love Thy Neighbor | Sam Parker | Main cast |
| 2014 | Bones | Ken Starkel / Broccoli | Episode: "The Carrot in the Kudzu" |
| 2014 | NCIS: Los Angeles | Kevin Turner | Episode: "The Grey Man" |
| 2015 | 2 Broke Girls | Josh | Episode: "And the Grate Expectations" |
| 2017 | Shameless | Pastor Di Leo | Episode: “Frank's Northern Southern Express” |
| 2017 | Modern Family | Jared Cook | Episode: "Heavy is the Head" |
| 2018–2020 | Henry Danger | Brian Bender / Dallas | 4 episodes |
| 2018 | Raven's Home | Officer Kowalski | Episode: "Cop to It" |
| 2018 | American Woman | Alan | supporting role |
| 2018 | Take Two | Tim Stepansky | Episode: "Shadows of the Past" |
| 2019 | Brooklyn Nine-Nine | Seth Haggerty | Episode: "He Said, She Said" |
| 2019 | Into the Dark | Steve | Episode: "Pure" |
| 2020 | NCIS | Commander Marshall Ray | Episode: "Flight Plan" |
| 2020 | 9-1-1: Lone Star | Tom Scanlon | Episode: "Austin, We Have a Problem" |
| 2020 | Danger Force | Brian Bender | Episode: "The Danger Force Awakens" |
| 2023 | Quantum Leap | ADA Bill Barnes | Episode: "Ben Song for the Defense" |
| 2023 | Judge Me Not | Martin Allen | Series regular |
| 2025 | High Potential | Clark Donovan | Episode: "The Sauna at the End of the Stairs" |

Web
| Year | Title | Role | Notes |
|---|---|---|---|
| 2013 | Twisted Tales | Barney | Episode: "Cached" |
| 2014 | The Josh Moore Show | Winston | Episode: "Trying to Fit in with Hipsters" |
| 2014 | Corporate | Chad | Episode: "Chad" |

Video games
| Year | Title | Role | Notes |
|---|---|---|---|
| 2011 | L.A. Noire | Patrick Connolly | Voice |
