= Lynn Toler =

American lawyer and TV judge

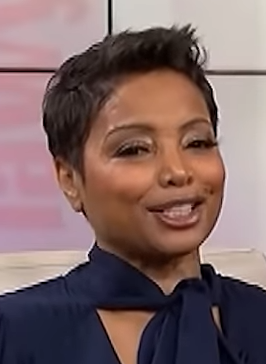
- Toler in November 2006
- Born: Lynn Candace Toler; October 25, 1959 (age 67); Columbus, Ohio, U.S.
- Education: Harvard University (AB) University of Pennsylvania (JD)
- Occupations: Judge; lawyer; arbitrator
- Years active: 2001–present
- Political party: Republican (until 2016); Independent (2016–present)
- Spouse: Eric Mumford (m. 1989; died 2022)
- Children: 2
- Website: Official website

Lynn Candace Toler (born October 25, 1959) is an American lawyer, judge, television arbitrator, and television presenter, best known for her role as arbitrator on Divorce Court. With her 14 seasons on the show, between 2006 and 2020, Toler is the longest-reigning arbitrator on the series.

Toler is also known for her co-hosting role (together with Dr. Ish Major) as a marriage mentor for the series Marriage Boot Camp, specifically Marriage Boot Camp: Reality Stars - Hip Hop Edition. To date, Toler has presented Marriage Boot Camp for three seasons since the show's 16th season, which began on February 6, 2020. Season 18 of Marriage Boot Camp premiered on October 17, 2021, and Toler was contracted to host the show for an additional 19th season as well, with the series concluding in 2022.

== Early life and education ==
Lynn Toler was born in Columbus, Ohio. She graduated from Columbus School for Girls, and went on to earn an undergraduate degree in English and American Literature from Harvard College (class of 1981) and a Juris Doctor from the University of Pennsylvania Law School (1984).

== Career ==
In 1993, at 34-years-old and after working as an attorney specializing in civil matters, Toler won her first judicial race by just six votes, as a Republican in a predominantly Democratic district. From 1994-2000, she served as Cleveland Heights Municipal Court's sole judge, with her cases involving all misdemeanor crimes, traffic violations, and minor-cost civil cases. Toler was known for enforcing non-traditional judgments, such as handwritten essays, and for creating mentoring and intervention programs.

Between 2001 and 2006, Toler was an adjunct professor at Ursuline College in Pepper Pike, Ohio, where she taught courses on Civil Rights Law and Women's Rights.

== Television and entertainment career ==
=== Court show judge (2001–2020) ===
During the 2001–2002 television season, Toler replaced Andrew Napolitano as the presiding judge over the nontraditional courtroom series, Power of Attorney. The program was canceled after that television year, however, with the show as a whole only lasting two seasons.

Toler experienced much greater success within the court-show genre when she became arbitrating judge over Divorce Court, the longest-running program in the court television genre, and one of the longest-syndicated programs of all time. Toler took over the bench beginning on September 11, 2006, with the premiere of the court show's 24th season, replacing Mablean Ephriam (of whom Toler has said she is fond and with whom Toler has had pleasant interactions). Toler would eventually become Divorce Court's longest-reigning judge (the series also features four other judges who have each had their tenures), presiding over the broadcast for 14 seasons. As the level-headed arbiter of Divorce Court, Toler was frequently seen providing counsel, words of wisdom, and trying to talk sense into the show's often outrageous couples. She used her vehement expression, emphasis, and strident vocal timbre to deliver her points.

In 2007, while hosting Divorce Court, she expanded her television presence by hosting the prime time television show and MyNetworkTV's Decision House, a couples therapy program. In 2008 and 2009, Toler was a regular contributor on News and Notes, a weekly news show on National Public Radio (NPR).

Toler departed Divorce Court after 14 years, announced publicly in March 2020. During an October 19, 2021, interview on Bailiff Byrd's Bonding with Byrd web series, Toler elaborated on details of her Divorce Court resignation, citing a list of dissatisfactions she had with production. Among them, Toler recounted efforts made by production to move the program into a more farcical, comedic direction following the popularity of her "Rolling Ray" Divorce Court case. Toler has also cited various other objections she had during her final season, such as the show's relocation from Los Angeles to Atlanta and a vastly altered, simulated "courtroom" set design that led to her having physical discomfort while ruling on cases. During the Bonding with Byrd interview, Toler also cited regular altercations with the Divorce Court crew, thus fueling her decision to resign from the program. Still, she has expressed grace for the opportunity to preside over the court show, which has since been presided over by Faith Jenkins (2020–2022) and Star Jones (2022–).

During her interview with Byrd, Toler added that while she didn't miss the show, as she had chosen to leave, she did miss the show in the form it was presented in prior to her final season.

=== Post–Divorce Court ===
Since February 2020, Toler has hosted the We TV hit series, Marriage Boot Camp: Reality Stars.

In May 2023, streaming service Allblk announced a deal with Toler where she would write and executive produce the drama Judge Me Not. The show was loosely based on her life, focusing on a Black female judge who joins an Atlanta municipal court after being elected by six votes.

== Authoring career ==
Toler is the author of My Mother's Rules: A Practical Guide to Becoming an Emotional Genius, in which she describes lessons her mother, Shirley (nicknamed Toni), taught her to handle both her father Bill Toler's erratic behavior and her own inner demons. She describes how this later came in handy when dealing with emotional people from the bench. She also discusses how to apply these rules to everyday life.

In 2009, her second book, Put it In Writing (co-authored with Deborah Hutchison), was published. This book contains agreements for use in common but uncomfortable situations between family and friends, such as lending money, and grown children returning home.

Judge Toler is also author of Making Marriage Work and Dear Sonali, Letters to the Daughter I Never had.

== Personal life ==
Toler resides in Mesa, Arizona. Toler and her husband, Eric Mumford, married on April 6, 1989, and Toler has two sons and four stepsons. On January 4, 2023, Judge Toler announced via social media that Eric Mumford died on December 23, 2022.

Toler has identified as a political Independent since 2017, and once served as an Ohio judge as a Republican. Toler has donated to both Democrats and Republicans.
