= Inanna Sarkis =

Canadian actress

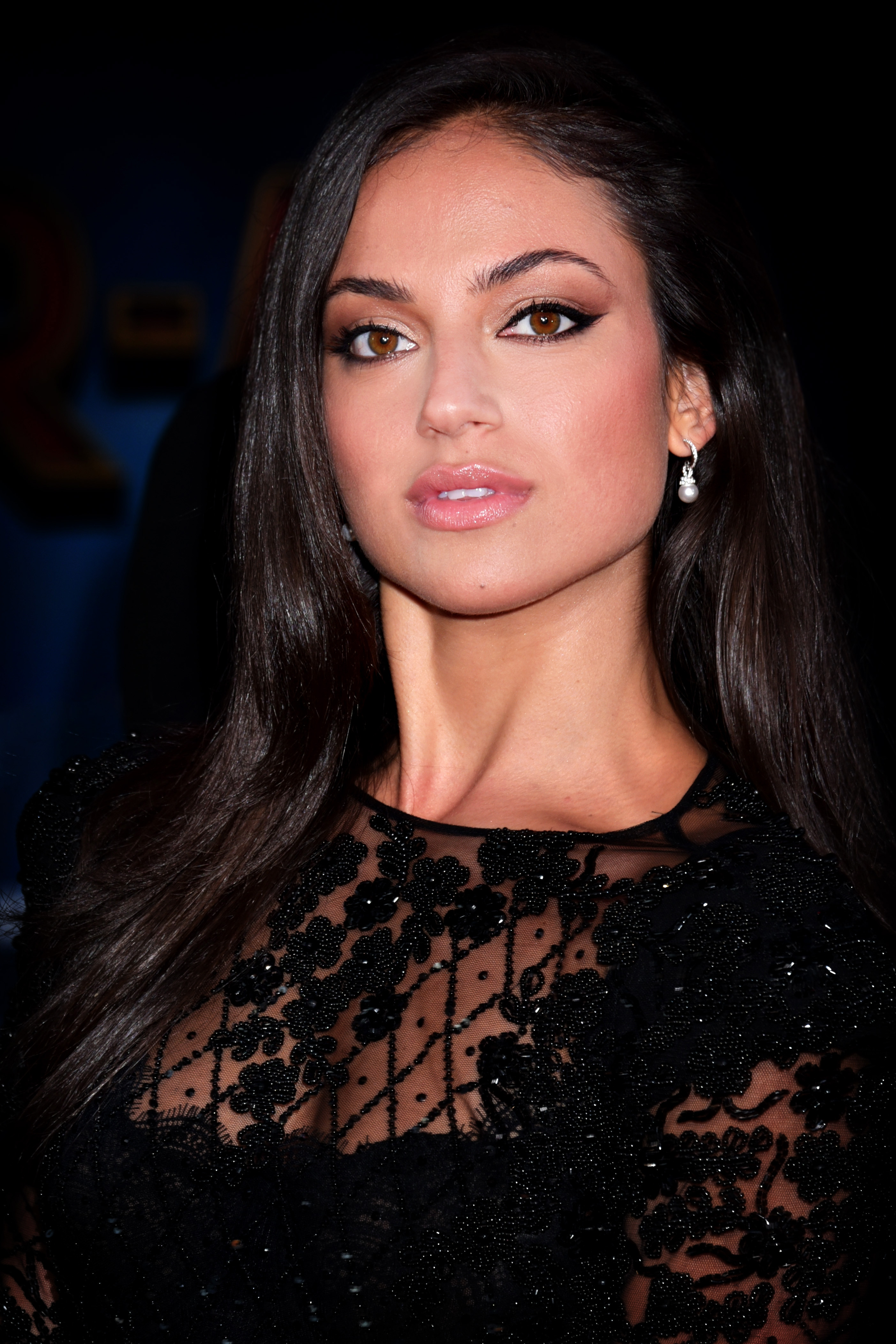
- Sarkis in 2019
- Born: Inanna Sarkis; Hamilton, Ontario, Canada
- Partner: Matthew Noszka (2017–present)
- Children: 1

YouTube information
- Channel: Inanna Sarkis
- Years active: 2017–present
- Subscribers: 3.6 million
- Views: 475 million
- Last updated: 4 August 2026

Inanna Sarkis is a Canadian actress.

== Early life and career ==
Sarkis was born in Hamilton, Ontario, the daughter of an ethnically Assyrian father from Syria who was a dentist and a Bulgarian mother who used to be a surgeon in Bulgaria. Both immigrated to Canada to start a new life for their children and worked cleaning dishes in banquet halls until they started their own family company.

Sarkis struck a deal with Sprint to participate in a campaign. Sarkis teamed up with the WWE to create a character named "Miss North" and visited the WWE Performance Center for where she filmed. She also starred in a digital campaign to promote 20th Century Fox's action spy comedy Kingsman: The Golden Circle in November.

== Personal life ==
In September 2020, Sarkis gave birth to a daughter, her first child with her boyfriend of three years Matthew Noszka.

== Filmography ==
Year	Title	Role	Notes
2016	Happy Birthday	Kasape Suka's Girlfriend	
2017	Boo 2! A Madea Halloween	Gabriella	
2019	College	Enaas	TV series
2019	After	Molly Samuels	
2019	Tales	Gina	Episode: “My Mind Playing Tricks On Me”
2020	Deported	Sarah	
2020	After We Collided	Molly Samuels	
2020	Brews Brothers	Becky	TV series
2020–2021	Trish & Scott	Trish	TV series
2021	Seance	Alice	
2025	Marked Men: Rule + Shaw	Jordynn	
2025	Maintenance Required	Lola	
2027	Beach Read †		Filming
TBA	All-Star Weekend †	Stephanie	Completed

== Discography ==
=== Singles ===
Title	Year	Album
"No Beauty in War"	2018	Non-album singles
"Best You'll Ever Have"	2019	Non-album singles
