= Saints & Sinners (2016 TV series) =

American soap opera (2016–2022)

- Genre: Soap opera
- Created by: Ty Scott
- Starring: Christian Keyes; Keith Robinson; J. D. Williams; Clifton Powell; Jasmine Burke; Gloria Reuben; Vanessa Bell Calloway; Afemo Omilami; Demetria McKinney
- Composers: Kenneth Lampl; Adam Lindquist
- Country of origin: United States
- Original language: English
- No. of seasons: 6
- No. of episodes: 49

Production
- Executive producers: Ty Scott; Ri-Karlo Handy; Elizabeth Kealoha
- Production location: Atlanta Georgia
- Running time: 42 minutes
- Production company: Swirl Films

Original release
- Network: Bounce TV
- Release: March 6, 2016 – May 22, 2022

Saints & Sinners is an American prime time television soap opera that aired on Bounce TV from March 6, 2016, until May 22, 2022. Starring Vanessa Bell Calloway, Clifton Powell, Keith Robinson, Christian Keyes, and Gloria Reuben. The series was the first original drama produced by the African-American-oriented television network Bounce TV and was a ratings success, running for six seasons.

== Premise ==
The series follows the daily lives of members of a Baptist church in a small town in Georgia. The destinies of Pastor Darryl Greene (David Banner) and the choir director (Keith Robinson) will be crossed with those of Lady Ella Johnson (Vanessa Bell Calloway).

== Production ==
On May 7, 2015, Bounce TV announced that it had ordered a new original drama, Saints & Sinners, from independent production company Swirl Films to premiere in 2016. The series serves as the first original drama commissioned by the African-American-oriented digital television network, whose previous originals were sitcoms. Saints & Sinners has been compared to the Oprah Winfrey Network drama series Greenleaf, which is also set at an African-American run church and was produced in Atlanta at the same time.

The eight-episode first season began filming in Atlanta, Georgia in January 2016. On January 12, 2016, Vanessa Bell Calloway, Gloria Reuben, Clifton Powell, Richard Lawson, Keith Robinson, Christian Keyes, Jasmine Burke, J. D. Williams, and Afemo Omilami were announced as main cast members of the series . The pilot was directed by filmmaker Jerry Lamothe. Principal photography ended February 25, 2016. To promote the series, Bounce TV allowed affiliates who carry the network on a digital subchannel to air an encore of the series premiere on their main channels. On April 13, 2016, the show was renewed for a second season that premiered on March 5, 2017. Bounce announced on January 22, 2019, via their Twitter account that the show was renewed for a fourth season, set to premiere on July 7, 2019. On August 11, 2020, the series was renewed for a fifth season and a stand-alone film was also announced. The series followed up with a made-for-TV movie titled Saints & Sinners: Judgment Day which aired February 14, 2021 on Bounce TV. On February 2, 2022, the series was renewed for a sixth and final season which premiered on April 3, 2022. Its final episode aired on May 22, 2022.

== Cast ==
=== Main ===
- Vanessa Bell Calloway as Lady Ella Johnson, First Lady of Greater Hope Baptist Church and new Mayor
- Gloria Reuben as the Mayor Pamela Clayborne (Seasons 1–2), Cypress Mayor
- Christian Keyes as Levi Sterling (Seasons 1–3; Guest, Seasons 4–6), a member of Greater Hope Baptist Church
- Jasmine Burke as Dr. Christie Johnson, Ella's daughter who is a doctor
- Clifton Powell as Rex Fisher, rival of Ella
- Keith Robinson as Miles Calloway, church choir director and secret love interest of Christie
- J. D. Williams as Jabari Morris, a long time friend of Ella and church member and Paige's husband.
- David Banner as Pastor Darryl Greene, a pastor at Ella's church
- Tray Chaney as Kendrick Murphy
- Demetria McKinney (Seasons 1–4) and Ashani Roberts (Seasons 5–6) as Tamara Austin/Tamara Austin Callaway, Miles' wife
- Lisa Arrindell as Rebecca Jourdan (Season 2), Fulton county prosecutor
- Emilio Rivera as Officer Francisco Cooper, a Cypress police officer
- Afemo Omilami as Detective Noah St. Charles, a Cypress detective who investigates Ella's husband's murder
- Donna Biscoe as Lady Leona Byrd, Ella's mother

=== Recurring ===
- Dawn Halfkenny as Angela Parks, a church worker and close friend of levi
- Jonny Hazen as Vice Det. Mario Rodriguez
- Kendrick Cross as Ben Truman (Seasons 1–2)
- Chris Gann as Travis Ford
- Sarafina King Rachel
- Maria Howell as Lt. Hawkins, a detective investigating the murder of Ella's husband (Seasons 1–3)
- Tony Vaughn as Vernon
- Richard Lawson as Pastor Evan Johnson, Ella's husband and Christie's father (Season 1)
- Summer Parker as Savannah Sterling
- Jeff Rose as Chief Herman Douglas
- Neil Carter as Maxwell Wallace
- Karlie Redd as Paige Morris, Jabari's wife
- Chelle Ramos as Detective Josephine Alvarez (Season 1)
- Jevon "Vawn" Sims as T.K.
- Mara Hall as Caledonia Kendall (Seasons 1–2)
- L. Warren Young as Zeke (Season 1)
- Dorothy Steel as Mother Harris
- Robin Givens as Wilhelmina Hayworth (Season 3)
- Keke Wyatt as Lady Azia Greene, Pastor Greene's wife
- Kaye Singleton as Josie, friend of Tamara and Miles
- Patrice Fisher as Stacia Cunningham (Seasons 2–5) & Anna (Season 6)
- Anthony Dalton (Season 3) and Karon Riley (Seasons 4–5) as Malik Thompson
- Tami Roman (Season 4) and Lisa Wu (Season 5) as Felicia Thompson
- Gregalan Willams (Season 5) as Victor Thompson
- Michael Anthony (Season 6) as Ray Ray

== Television movie ==
Saints & Sinners announced they would air an all new original made-for-TV film titled Saints & Sinners: Judgement Day, which aired on Bounce TV, Valentine's Day, 2021. The movie chronicles the events that ended in season 4, leading into season 5 which aired in April 2021.

== Episodes ==
=== Series overview ===
Season	Episodes	Originally released	
Season	Episodes	First released	Last released
1	8	March 6, 2016	April 24, 2016
2	8	March 5, 2017	April 23, 2017
3	8	April 8, 2018	May 27, 2018
4	8	July 7, 2019	August 25, 2019
Special		February 14, 2021	
5	8	April 11, 2021	June 6, 2021
6	8	April 3, 2022	May 22, 2022

=== Season 1 (2016) ===
No. overall	No. in season	Title	Directed by	Written by	Original release date	U.S. viewers (millions)
1	1	"Power Is Our Religion"	Jerry Lamothe	T.S. Grant	March 6, 2016	1.30
The prodigal son returns to Greater Hope Baptist Church, dodging fallout of an Insider Trading investigation, only to find the hometown of his past has been swallowed up by greed, lust and deceit.
2	2	"The Hustle Is The Hustle"	Jerry Lamothe	J. Bishop	March 13, 2016	N/A
A murder investigation reopens past wounds as details resurface of another tragedy that shook the town of Cypress decades before.
3	3	"Even The Devil Was An Angel"	Jerry Lamothe	Katrina M. Andrews	March 20, 2016	N/A
Ulterior motives come into focus as ruthless ambition and secret alliances continue to blur the lines between saint and sinner.
4	4	"We're In This Together"	Darren Grant	Jazmen Darnell Brown	March 27, 2016	N/A
Old debts come due, but money trumps all at Greater Hope. Desire, jealousy and the pursuit of power collide at Greater Hope.
5	5	"Pain"	Darren Grant	Norman Anderson	April 3, 2016	N/A
As the investigation heats up, time runs out to settle a dead man's debt. A brutal attack puts Levi face-to-face with devious players from Pastor Johnson's past.
6	6	"Needy Not Greedy"	Russ Parr	Norman Anderson	April 10, 2016	N/A
Levi must step over the line to protect the innocent, while the detectives close in on their prime suspect.
7	7	"Don't Go"	Darren Grant	Aigefrnon Thackery	April 17, 2016	N/A
Police scramble to follow new leads and discover a key that may unlock the dark and lethal secrets to this murder mystery.
8	8	"Revelations"	Darren Grant	T.S. Grant	April 24, 2016	1.4
In the season finale, sinful power plays and wicked double-crosses take center stage as the Pastor's killer is finally revealed.

=== Season 2 (2017) ===
No. overall	No. in season	Title	Directed by	Written by	Original release date	U.S. viewers (millions)
9	1	"Playing Dirty"	Darren Grant	T.S. Grant	March 5, 2017	1.4
A new murder mystery is uncovered at Greater Hope Baptist Church. Newly elected Mayor Ella Johnson and the remaining power players in Cypress face corruption, courtrooms, and scandal.
10	2	"Tragic Circumstances"	Darren Grant	Norman Anderson	March 12, 2017	N/A
Past wounds are reopened as a murder investigation resurrects details of another tragedy that shook the town of Cypress decades earlier.
11	3	"I Had No Choice"	Darren Grant	Francisco J. Bustamante	March 19, 2017	N/A
A mysterious kidnapping costs Jabari nearly everything he's sacrificed to build his new empire. Levi shocks everyone with a prediction by Pastor Johnson that has come true.
12	4	"Who's The Boss?"	Darren Grant	Jazmen Darnell Brown	March 26, 2017	N/A
Worlds collide when a powerful trio comes from out the shadows to take down Lady Ella and keep Jabari at bay. The detectives' clues about Dead Debra lead them right back to where they started, Greater Hope Baptist Church.
13	5	"This Union Will Be The Death Of Me"	Russ Parr	Norman Anderson	April 2, 2017	N/A
Christie faces blackmail as she prepares for her wedding. Elsewhere, Rex reverts to his old ways of doing business.
14	6	"Day of Reckoning"	Russ Parr	Rhonda F. Baraka	April 9, 2017	N/A
Wedding bells sound as the detectives gain enough clues to re-enact the murder. Rex and Jabari's struggle for power takes a violent turn.
15	7	"The Queen and the Criminal"	Vanessa Bell Calloway	Rhonda F. Baraka	April 16, 2017	N/A
A new first family emerges as Lady Ella and Rex drop a bomb on Kendrick and Christie. Miles faces double grief on his own, when a loved one returns right on time.
16	8	"Revival"	Darren Grant	T.S. Grant	April 23, 2017	N/A
In the shocking season finale, Christie snaps under the pressure of losing everything. Old truths are finally uncovered as new ones are buried.

=== Season 3 (2018) ===
No. overall	No. in season	Title	Directed by	Written by	Original release date	U.S. viewers (millions)
17	1	"Buried Secret"	Russ Parr	T.S. Grant	April 7, 2018	1.2
Christie's tragic mistake unravels a chain reaction of secrets that stand to not only destroy her, but the entire town of Cypress.
18	2	"Personal, Not Business"	Russ Parr	T.S. Grant	April 14, 2018	N/A
Levi shows Lady Ella his dark side while pulling the plug on her reign of power.
19	3	"Birds of a Feather"	Russ Parr	Nigel Campbell	April 22, 2018	N/A
Lady Byrd re-enforces her strangle hold on Cypress society with the help of her upper crust colleagues.
20	4	"Any Means Necessary"	Russ Parr	Francisco J. Bustamante	April 29, 2018	N/A
Jabari steps up to a leadership position at Greater Hope as he goes for his legit piece of Cypress pie. Christie explores an unexpected way to self soothe her inner demons.
21	5	"He Works in Mysterious Ways"	Vanessa Bell Calloway	Jazmen Darnell Brown	May 6, 2018	N/A
Rex goes against the gangster grain to avoid getting squeezed out as the neighborhood heavy, but Kendrick becomes collateral damage.
22	6	"Sinner Takes All"	Vanessa Bell Calloway	Nigel Campbell	May 13, 2018	N/A
St. Charles gets closer to the truth about the Johnson/Byrd family while Lady Ella faces a mayoral recall.
23	7	"The Devil is in the Details"	Russ Parr	Francisco J. Bustamante	May 20, 2018	N/A
Lady Ella goes to bloody extremes to protect her position of power.
24	8	"Where There's Smoke"	Russ Parr	T.S. Grant	May 27, 2018	N/A
Cypress' tragedies come full circle as Lady Ella embraces Rex and the dark side, while Lady Byrd gets a taste of her own medicine.

=== Season 4 (2019) ===
No. overall	No. in season	Title	Directed by	Written by	Original release date	U.S. viewers (millions)
25	1	"Here We Go Again"	Russ Parr	Elizabeth Kealoha	July 7, 2019	1.3
As Greater Hope rebuilds, Ella continues to stall Malik & Jabari as she makes the ultimate gamble for her future.
26	2	"Big Sister Is Watching"	Russ Parr	Nigel Campbell	July 14, 2019	N/A
The arrival of a new power player in Cypress changes the rules of the game.
27	3	"Best Laid Plains"	Russ Parr	Francisco J. Bustamante	July 21, 2019	N/A
Rex doubles down on his love for Ella as she scrambles to buy back Greater Hope
28	4	"Into the Lion's Den"	Russ Parr	Courtney Miller	July 28, 2019	N/A
Ella must play nice with Jabari in order for her to win the long game.
29	5	"Dark Will Come to Light"	Courtney Miller	Nigel Campbell	August 4, 2019	N/A
Rex does Ella's bidding only to be burned in the end.
30	6	"The House Always Wins"	Courtney Miller	Courtney Miller	August 11, 2019	N/A
After Ella's successful casino opening, Rex reveals long held secrets that could reverse her good fortune.
31	7	"Sit Down, Be Humble"	Courtney Miller	Francisco J. Bustamante	August 18, 2019	N/A
Ella & Rex make a deal as the FBI closes in.
32	8	"Water Runs Red"	Courtney Miller	Nigel Campbell	August 25, 2019	N/A
The game is up for Ella as she fights to survive.

=== Special (2021) ===
No. overall	No. in season	Title	Directed by	Written by	Original release date	U.S. viewers (millions)
33	-	"Judgment Day"	Courtney Miller	Nigel Campbell	February 14, 2021	N/A
Lady Byrd wreaks havoc as Ella desperately seeks a way to clear her name regarding Malik's murder. Rex drops a major bomb on Ella.

=== Season 5 (2021) ===
No. overall	No. in season	Title	Directed by	Written by	Original release date	U.S. viewers (millions)
34	1	"Immaculate Deception"	Courtney Miller	Nigel Campbell	April 11, 2021	N/A
The fallout from Malik's death brings his Father, Victor Thompson, to Cypress, and he's armed with a major revelation.
35	2	"The Devil You Know"	Courtney Miller	Krystal N. Foster	April 18, 2021	N/A
Miles refuses to use his alibi to clear his name in the Malik murder mystery. Lady Byrd finally tells Ella the truth regarding her parentage.
36	3	"Lord Of The Harvest"	Courtney Miller	Courtney Miller	April 25, 2021	N/A
Rex is concerned about Victor's quick hold on Ella; Josie makes a bold move for Miles' freedom; Jabari admits his feelings for Angela...just as Christie finally frees Paige from captivity at the hospital.
37	4	"She Is Risen"	Courtney Miller	Francisco J. Bustamante	May 2, 2021	N/A
Paige's return to Cypress causes a stir, resulting in Angela's broken heart when Jabari confirms that he wants to keep his family together; Kendrick finds himself in hot water; Christie unwillingly picks up where Dr. Ross left off; Malik's killer is finally revealed.
38	5	"From Here To Paternity"	Courtney Miller	Krystal N. Foster	May 9, 2021	N/A
Jabari encourages Angela to report a major news story while Rex teams up with Felicia; Christie stumbles across some disturbing information while Victor makes a subtle play for Tamara's Upsurge shares; Rex confronts Stacia about her child's true paternity and the truth comes out during the baby shower.
39	6	"To The Victor Goes The Spoils"	Courtney Miller	Courtney Miller	May 16, 2021	N/A
During Upsurge's Gala, Ella and Felicia race to secure enough votes for the CEO position, but an unexpected third party makes his own power moves that impact the lives of several people.
40	7	"The Mark of the Beast"	Courtney Miller	Francisco J. Bustamante	May 23, 2021	N/A
As Victor's reign of terror spreads to Tamara and Stacia, Rex and Ella reteam up to bring him down, getting help from an unexpected ally; Paige tells Jabari that she'll help save his company if he fires Angela.
41	8	"You Have To Choose One"	Courtney Miller	Nigel Campbell	June 6, 2021	N/A
Kendrick reels from an unimaginable loss, but pulls himself together to help Christie when she needs him; when Angela continues to wreak havoc on Jabari & Paige, the latter threatens to take matters into her own hands. Ella and Victor have a final face-off, and the person behind the organ trafficking is revealed.

=== Season 6 (2022) ===
No. overall	No. in season	Title	Directed by	Written by	Original release date	U.S. viewers (millions)
42	1	"Fruit Of The Vine"	Russ Parr	Nigel Campbell	April 3, 2022	N/A
Five months after the season finale, Angela's missing, Miles is in a coma, and Rex has been framed. Meanwhile, Kendrick dreams of Stacia, a jailed Jabari gets vague info about his father's death, and Ella gets an offer to take down all the crime rings in Cypress.
43	2	"The Truth Won't Set You Free"	Russ Parr	Francisco J. Bustamante	April 10, 2022	N/A
Kendrick meets Stacia's twin. Free from jail, Jabari confronts Paige about Angela's death & bringing Ray Ray back into their lives. Josie meets Ray Ray for the first time, which Rex wants to use to his advantage. Ella discovers Lady Byrd & Christie's connection to the organ ring, which leads to a shocking reveal from the former. Rex knows more about Jabari's father than he's letting on.
44	3	"Oedipus Rex"	Russ Parr	Courtney Miller	April 17, 2022	N/A
Ella and Rex unite to bring down Ray Ray, but Leona reveals a secret about him that changes everything; Kendrick and Anna bond; Jabari looks into Angela's disappearance; Christie works overtime to find a quick cure for Leona's terminal illness.
45	4	"Kill Or Be Killed"	Russ Parr	Francisco J. Bustamante	April 24, 2022	N/A
After Leona's shocking revelation, Ray Ray launches a counterattack on Rex & Ella. As a scheming Anna seduces a vulnerable Kendrick, Rex enlists Josie's help in finding dirt on Stacia's twin. In exchange, Josie has Rex snatch a comatose Miles from Tamara. Ray Ray redirects Jabari's attention to Rex when he demands answers about his Father. Christie is unknowingly in danger.
46	5	"A New Dawn"	Russ Parr	Nigel Campbell	May 1, 2022	N/A
As Miles awakens from his coma to an unraveling Josie, Angela resurfaces to wreak havoc under Ray Ray's command to enact the next phase of her, his, and Levi's plan. Tony gets suspicious of Ella, and Ray Ray tells Rex he wants to collaborate...on the condition that he kills Jabari.
47	6	"I Did It To Survive"	Russ Parr	Courtney Miller	May 8, 2022	N/A
While Miles fights to escape from an unhinged Josie, various characters mix and mingle at a broadcast awards ceremony. After Kendrick makes her trustee, Ana locks him out of his own home. Rex admits to Jabari that he killed his Father. Levi exposes Ella's past murders throughout the series, leading to her public arrest.
48	7	"Deliver Us From Ella"	Russ Parr	Francisco J. Bustamante	May 15, 2022	N/A
Ella flees with a pregnant Angela to avoid arrest, but she escapes. As Ella unravels, she hallucinates seeing Noah St. Cloud at the church. Dr. Ross abducts Christie. Ana betrays Kendrick. Tamara arrives to save Miles, but Josie overpowers her and flees with him. Ray Ray betrays Levi. Josie and Miles nearly crash into Angela, triggering Angela's labor and causing Josie's death. Rex helps Ella escape, but Ray Ray and his goons follow them, so the duo must prepare for one last showdown.
49	8	"My Soul To Take"	Russ Parr	Nigel Campbell	May 22, 2022	N/A
The showdown between Rex, Ella, and Ray Ray takes several twists and turns, ultimately leading to Ray Ray's death. Lady Byrd receives his kidney, saving her life and allowing her to make amends with Ella and Christie after she and Levi save the latter. Jabari discovers his Father was an informant, thus allowing him to forgive Rex. Kendrick and Ana reconcile. Ella leads the police to her location before seemingly dying in a house explosion. One month later, Levi gives Christie the church, and Angela reminds him he's her child's Father. Tamara, Austin, Kendrick, Ana and Lady Byrd attend a church memorial service for Josie. Jabari and a pregnant Paige arrive too. In the end, it's revealed that Ella faked her death and is on an island with Rex, living happily ever after.

== Reception ==
Saints & Sinners has received mixed to positive reviews from critics, but became a breakthrough series for Bounce TV, and their most-watched program ever since it launched. The first episode earned 1.3 million viewers, and in second week it drew 1.5 million viewers.

Robert Lloyd of Los Angeles Times wrote that "An engaging cast compensates for a multitude of dramatic or technical sins, and where it doesn’t, it usually makes them entertaining." Ashly Moran of TV Insider praised the cast chemistry and strong female characters, comparing the show's drama and use of music to FOX's Empire.
