= Bre-Z =

American rapper (born 1987)

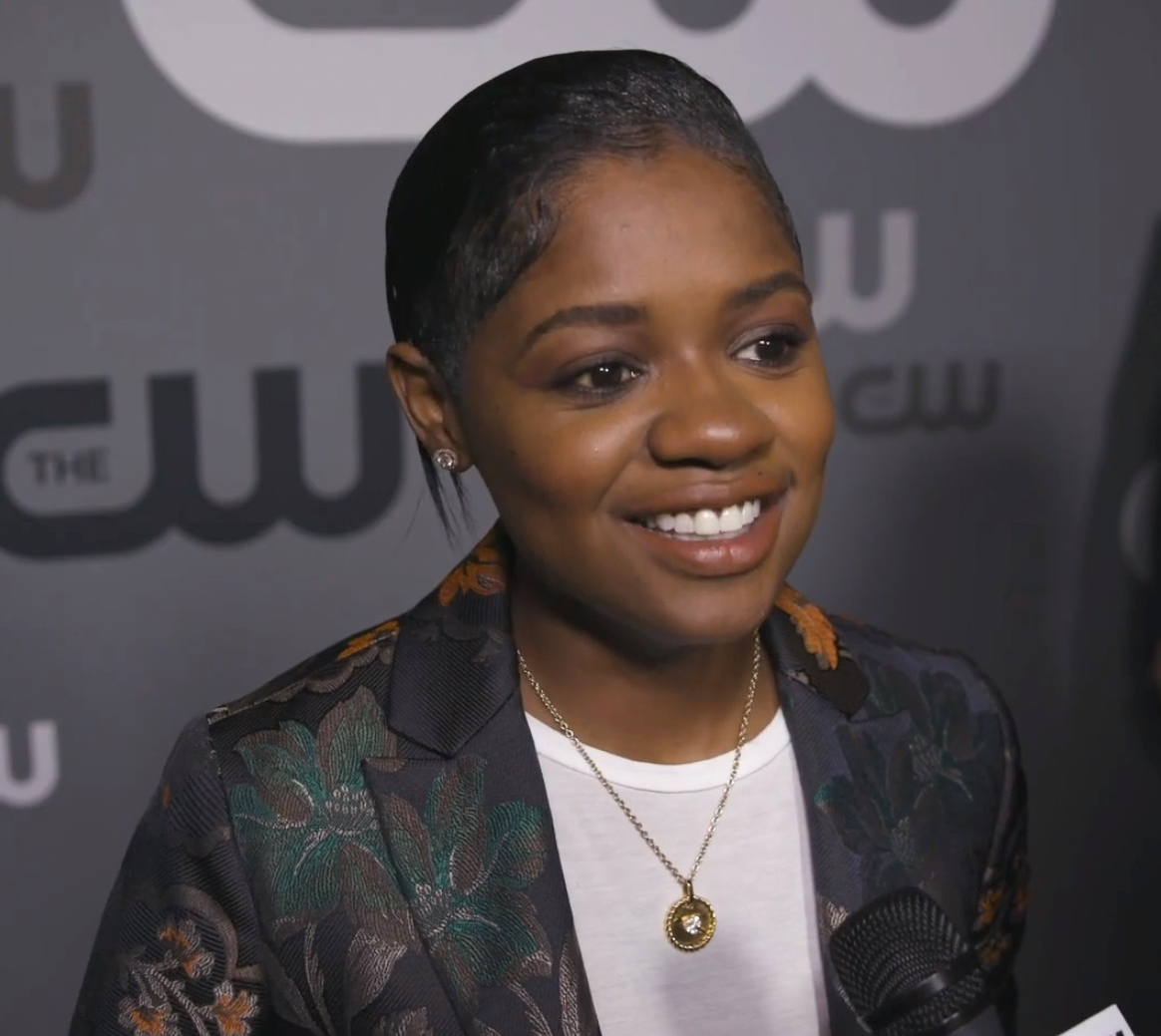
- Bre-Z in 2019
- Born: Calesha Murray; July 22, 1987 (age 39); Philadelphia, Pennsylvania, U.S.
- Occupations: Actress, rapper
- Years active: 2015–present

Calesha Murray (born July 22, 1987), known professionally as Bre-Z, is an American actress and rapper, best known for her roles as Tamia "Coop" Cooper in the American drama series All American and as Freda Gatz in Empire.

== Early life ==
Calesha Murray was born on July 22, 1987, in Philadelphia, Pennsylvania, and was raised in Wilmington, Delaware. Her grandmother gave her the nickname "Bre-Z" at birth when she would not stop crying until a window was shut, so they called her "breezy". She found out it wasn't her real name when she began elementary school. As a child, she had short hair and people would often mistake her for a boy. In sixth grade, she decided that she wanted to pursue music. Her mother worked in the entertainment industry, and once woke up to Wu-Tang Clan in her living room, so she knew that she would become involved in the entertainment industry from a young age. Bre-Z graduated high school in 2005. She attended Full Sail University in Winter Park, Florida. In 2008, she moved to Atlanta when her mom found a job there. Bre-Z began cutting hair at the age of 10, and comes from a family of barbers, with her grandfather, father, and mother all working as barbers. While working as a barber, she cut hair for Akon, Ludacris and Rob Dougie . In 2014, she moved to Los Angeles to pursue her dream of becoming a musician with only one dollar in her bank account.

== Career ==
Bre-Z began her music career at age 14 with impromptu performances around Philadelphia. Her brother used to rap, and she would perform his songs until she began writing her own. When she was 15, she met Freeway. Freeway put her in a studio and recorded her first song with her.

Bre-Z began writing songs with Dr. Dre, Jennifer Lopez, and The Game. She moved to Los Angeles when she was 24 to pursue her music. In 2015, after landing an audition through a barbershop connection, Bre-Z was cast in the role of Freda Gatz. It was her first audition and first time acting. She appeared on the soundtrack several times throughout her time on the show, sometimes performing her own raps. In November 2018, she was the grand marshal of the Xavier University homecoming parade.

In 2018, Bre-Z was cast as Tamia "Coop" Cooper in the drama All American. She once stated that "Coop is literally Bre-Z in high school," emphasizing the similarities between her and her character. Her role has been praised as breaking barriers for the LGBTQ community.

She released an EP, The Grl in 2015 on her independent label. Her most recent album is titled Full Circle.

== Personal life ==
In regard to her sexuality, Bre-Z has stated that she wants to keep her romantic interests private. In one interview, Bre-Z said, "I love everybody. But when it gets down to whatever is underneath my clothes, whatever is inside of my home, or in my bedroom... I feel like at some point, being in the public eye, you have to keep something for yourself. And that's just what I choose to keep for me."

Bre-Z is very spiritual. She lives in Los Angeles, California. Her favorite movie is Juice.

== Filmography ==
=== Television ===
Year	Title	Role	Notes
2015–2019	Empire	Freda Gatz	Recurring character, 31 episodes
2016	The Real	Self	1 episode
2017	Tales	Ty	Episode: "Children's Story"
2017	The New Edition Story	Peanut Bell	Episode: "Part 1"
2018	Celebrity Page	Self	1 episode
2018	Down for Whatever	Denise	TV movie
2018–2026	All American	Tamia "Coop" Cooper	Main role
2021	Living the Lyrics		Game show
2021	Way Too Crazy	Self	
2023–present	MTV Couples Retreat	Self	Series regular
2024	Good Times: Black Again	G-Money / Crowd / Residents (voice)	Episode: "The Projects Divided"
2025	Can You Feel the Beat: The Lisa Lisa Story	Toni Ménage	TV movie

=== Film ===
Year	Title	Role	Notes
2017	Fat Camp	Winnie	
2020	16 Bars	Taj	
2020	True to the Game 2	Taj	
2026	If I Go Will They Miss Me		Post-production

== Discography ==
- The Grl. (2018)
- Full Circle (2020)
