= If Not Now, When? (film) =

Drama film by Tamara Bass

- Directed by: Tamara Bass; Meagan Good
- Written by: Tamara Bass
- Produced by: Tamara Bass; Meagan Good; Rizi Timane; Datari Turner
- Starring: Meagan Holder; Mekia Cox; Tamara Bass; Meagan Good
- Cinematography: Craig Dean Devine
- Edited by: Lauren Connelly
- Music by: James Perry
- Production company: Krazy Actress Productions
- Distributed by: Vertical Entertainment
- Release dates: 2019 (American Black Film Festival); January 8, 2021 (United States)
- Running time: 111 minutes
- Country: United States
- Language: English

If Not Now, When? is a 2019 American drama film written by Tamara Bass and directed by Bass with Meagan Good (in their feature directorial debut). The film stars Meagan Holder, Mekia Cox, Tamara Bass and Meagan Good as four friends who forced back together when one of them suffers a crisis. Valarie Pettiford, Edwin Hodge, Lexi Underwood, Niles Fitch, Todd Williams, and McKinley Freeman round out the cast.

The film premiered at the 2019 American Black Film Festival. It later was released on January 8, 2021, by Vertical Entertainment. The film received generally mixed reviews from critics.

== Cast ==
- Meagan Holder as Deidre
  - Josephine Lawrence as Teenage Deidre
- Mekia Cox as Suzanne
  - Amanda Mayfield as Teenage Suzanne
- Tamara Bass as Patrice
  - Iyana Halley as Teenage Patrice
- Meagan Good as Tyra
  - Li Eubanks as Teenage Tyra
- Valarie Pettiford as Lorna
- Edwin Hodge as Walter
- Lexi Underwood as Jillian
- Niles Fitch as Michael
- Todd Williams
- McKinley Freeman as Jackson
- Jon Chaffin as Trevor
- Kyle Schmid as Max
- Amber Chardae Robinson as Elaine

== Critical response ==
On the review aggregator website Rotten Tomatoes, 53% of 17 critics' reviews are positive.

Film critic Lisa Kennedy from Variety wrote in her review: "The drama “If Not Now, When?” owes more to Waiting to Exhale than to the women-centric films of Tyler Perry. That's a good thing, as well as intentional on the part of its first-time feature directors, actors Meagan Good and Tamara Bass." Katie Walsh from Los Angeles Times also give it positive review praising Bass' writing and performances, particularly Meagan Holder' performance. Monica Castillo from RogerEbert.com gave it a negative review writing: "Between its amateurish direction, pedestrian cinematography, and overly plotted script, the narrative and visuals don’t coalesce into a story that feels restorative, cathartic, or even joyful." Teo Bugbee from The New York Times also gave it a negative review.
