= If I Go Will They Miss Me =

2026 film by Walter Thompson-Hernández

- Theatrical release poster
- Directed by: Walter Thompson-Hernández
- Written by: Walter Thompson-Hernández
- Produced by: Josh Peters; Saba Zerehi; Ben Stillman
- Starring: J. Alphonse Nicholson; Danielle Brooks; Bodhi Dell; Myles Bullock; Bre-Z
- Cinematography: Michael Fernandez
- Edited by: Walter Thompson-Hernández; Daysha Broadway
- Music by: Malcolm Parson
- Production companies: Spark Features; Further Adventures; Cedar Road; Merino Films; LinLay Productions
- Distributed by: Rich Spirit
- Release dates: January 24, 2026 (Sundance); September 11, 2026 (United States)
- Running time: 95 minutes
- Country: United States
- Language: English
- Box office: $1,017,913

If I Go Will They Miss Me is a 2026 American drama film written, directed, and edited by Walter Thompson-Hernández. It is an expansion of the 2022 short film of the same name by Thompson-Hernández. It stars J. Alphonse Nicholson, Danielle Brooks, Bodhi Dell, Myles Bullock and Bre-Z.

It had its world premiere at the 2026 Sundance Film Festival on January 24, 2026. It had a limited release in the U.S. on September 11, 2026 by Rich Spirit.

== Plot ==
In the Watts neighborhood of Los Angeles, twelve-year-old Lil Ant attempts to connect with his father, Big Ant, who has recently returned from one of many stays in jail. Lil Ant compares his father’s time in jail to Odysseus at Troy, and sometimes views his father in a toga or surrounded by Greek warships. Lil Ant explains in the opening that his father was a good kid who enjoyed drawing before an incident taunting and assaulting a local janitor led to his first run-in with law enforcement. Before Big Ant was apprehended by the police, he experienced a vision in his home of boys from his neighborhood lined up like airplanes.

In the present, Big Ant is shown to have difficulties adjusting to life at home, where he works at a nearby stable with the Compton Cowboys, smokes with his friends, and has an affair with a woman from the other side of the housing project, while struggling to make time for Lil Ant and his other two children, and their mother Lozita. One morning before going to the ranch, Big Ant is revealed to still experience visions of boys in his neighborhood, now including his son, lined up in street intersections like airplanes awaiting takeoff.

Lil Ant is a quiet kid, often praised by the other adults in the community for his good nature, and he is shown to spend his time learning about and drawing Pegasus, ridden by a trident-wielding Poseidon, who is drawn with the likeness of his father. Lil Ant tells his father that this is due to an assignment at his school where they are learning about Greek mythology, though comments suggest that Lil Ant’s interest precedes this school curriculum. Big Ant is clearly uncomfortable with Lil Ant’s drawings of his father, and admonishes him to stop, but gives no explanation why.

When Big Ant takes his children to a swap meet to reward eldest daughter Acacia for her straight As, he witnesses Lil Ant shoplifting a model commercial jet. Big Ant allows Lil Ant to leave with the plane, but chastises him later in the car. One night, Lil Ant sees visions of children in the courtyard, similar to his father’s, and leaves the home to investigate, unaware that his father sees him leave and reports his behavior to Lozita.

When Big Ant investigates Lil Ant’s bedroom, he is first impressed by and interacts with a papier-mâché construction of a purple Pegasus and wings that are meant for wearing over one’s arms, but soon discovers a drawing notebook full of sketches depicting the visions both father and son see. As Big Ant becomes fearful of what this means for Lil Ant, he throws away the artwork and construction, leading to a confrontation with Lozita and Lil Ant. This confrontation ends with Big Ant hitting his son in the courtyard in front of his friend JJ and Lozita, all of whom immediately step in to prevent more violence and to console Lil Ant. Lozita soon moves out of the apartment and into her sister’s apartment without telling Big Ant, just before he returns home intending to surprise Lil Ant with new earrings as reward for his performance in school.

While away from his father, Lil Ant dons his cardboard Pegasus wings and attempts to jump from a rooftop, but is stopped by his father’s friend JJ who has been increasingly concerned for Lil Ant. JJ instructs Big Ant to accept his son’s admiration and embrace him before he is taken away. The final shot shows Big Ant reconnecting with his children on a beach, where he accepts Lil Ant’s image of him as mighty Poseidon, and throws his trident over the sea.

== Cast ==
- J. Alphonse Nicholson as Big Ant
- Bodhi Dell as Lil Ant
- Danielle Brooks as Lozita
- Myles Bullock as JJ
- Bre-Z as Jenn

== Production ==
The film was selected for the 2023 Sundance Institute Screenwriting & Directors Lab. It also received a $120,000 grant from the 2025 Sundance Institute Filmmakers Fund. and the Michael Latt Legacy 2025 Panavision Package Grant.

== Release ==
If I Go Will They Miss Me premiered at the 2026 Sundance Film Festival on January 24, 2026. In March 2026, Rich Spirit acquired U.S. and select international distribution rights to the film for nearly $1 million, releasing it in select theaters on September 11, 2026 in the U.S. and before expansion wide release on September 18, 2026.

== Reception ==
On review aggregator website Rotten Tomatoes, the film holds an approval rating of 95% based on 44 reviews, with an average rating of 7.6/10. The website’s consensus reads: "If I Go Will They Miss Me transforms the bleak realities of life in the projects into a lyrical, gravity-defying portrait of childhood wonder and communal care." Metacritic, which uses a weighted average, assigned the film a score of 86 out of 100, based on 12 critics, indicating "universal acclaim". Lisa Laman of Looper later dubbed it one of the ten most underrated movies of 2026 and reserved special praise for its poetic imagery and J. Alphonse Nicholson's lead performance.

=== Accolades ===
Award	Date of ceremony	Category	Nominee(s)	Result	Ref.
Bentonville Film Festival	June 21, 2026	Best Narrative	If I Go Will They Miss Me	Won	
Brooklyn Film Festival	June 9, 2026	Certificate of Outstanding Achievement - Cinematography	Michael Fernandez	Won	
Dallas International Film Festival	April 30, 2026	Grand Jury Prize - Narrative Feature	If I Go Will They Miss Me	Won	
Deauville Film Festival	September 13, 2026	Jury Prize	If I Go Will They Miss Me	Won	
La Roche-sur-Yon International Film Festival	October 18, 2026	Grand Prix du Jury	If I Go Will They Miss Me	Nominated	
Las Palmas de Gran Canaria International Film Festival	May 2, 2026	Best Performance Award	Danielle Brooks	Won	
Martha's Vineyard African American Film Festival	August 15, 2026	Jury Award	If I Go Will They Miss Me	Won	
Palm Springs International Film Festival	January 4, 2026	Directors to Watch	Walter Thompson-Hernández	Won	
Sundance Film Festival	February 1, 2026	NEXT Innovator Award	If I Go Will They Miss Me	Nominated	
