= Don't Waste Your Pretty =

Comedt-drama film by Tamara Bass

- Directed by: Tamara Bass
- Written by: Katrina O'Gilvie
- Based on: Don't Waste Your Pretty by Demetria L. Lucas
- Produced by: Keith Neal; Ron Robinson; James Seppelfrick; Datari Turner
- Starring: Keri Hilson; Deborah Joy Winans; Redaric Williams; Jasmine Burke; Kaye Singleton; Rainey Branch
- Cinematography: Daniel Friedberg
- Edited by: Dante Wyatt
- Production company: Swirl Films
- Release date: February 28, 2021
- Running time: 90 minutes
- Country: United States
- Language: English

Don't Waste Your Pretty is an American romantic comedy-drama film written by Katrina O'Gilvie and directed by Tamara Bass. The film stars Keri Hilson, Deborah Joy Winans, Redaric Williams, Jasmine Burke, Kaye Singleton and Rainey Branch. The film is based on the book with the same name by Demetria L. Lucas. It follows a group of close friends then one of them, single career woman Mykah Jones, reads a book Don't Waste Your Pretty and subsequently begins to change her view to relationships.

== Cast ==
- Keri Hilson as Mykah Jones
- Deborah Joy Winans as Jeanné
- Redaric Williams as Michael
- Jasmine Burke as Aisha
- Kaye Singleton as Amma
- Rainey Branch as Lisa
- L. Warren Young as Charlie
- Rico Ball as Jason
- Norma Alvarez as Marta Ortiz

== Production ==
The film was filmed in August 2020 in Atlanta, Georgia and was produced by Swirl Films. The trailer was released in January 2021. The film premiered on TV One on February 28, 2021.
