= Julia Rodgers =

American attorney and businesswoman

- Born: United States
- Education: Simmons College (BA); Suffolk University Law School (JD)
- Occupations: Attorney, entrepreneur
- Known for: Founder and CEO of HelloPrenup
- Notable work: Collaborative online prenuptial agreement platform
- Television: Shark Tank (2021)
- Awards: Fastcase 50 (2023); Suffolk Law Outstanding Graduate of the Last Decade (2024); Inc. Female Founders 500 (2025)

Julia Rodgers is an American attorney and businesswoman. She is the co-founder and chief executive officer of HelloPrenup, an online platform that allows couples to draft state-compliant prenuptial agreements collaboratively. Rodgers gained national attention after appearing on the television series Shark Tank in 2021, where she and her co-founder secured investment from Kevin O’Leary and guest shark Nirav Tolia.

== Early life and education ==
Rodgers earned her undergraduate degree from Simmons College in 2009. She received a Juris Doctor from Suffolk University Law School in 2016, where coursework on legal automation influenced her interest in legal technology.

== Career ==
After law school, Rodgers practiced family law in Boston. In that role she observed the expense and complexity of traditional prenuptial agreements, which motivated her to explore automated alternatives and legal-technology solutions.

Rodgers founded HelloPrenup in 2021 to provide an online, state-specific prenuptial agreement service that allows both partners to participate in drafting and reviewing the agreement digitally. Rodgers and co-founder Sarabeth Jaffe appeared on Shark Tank (season 13, episode 6) in November 2021, securing a deal reportedly worth $150,000 for 30 percent equity.

Rodgers and HelloPrenup have been discussed in national outlets examining prenup trends and legal technology; for example, The New Yorker cited HelloPrenup as part of a broader trend of increased prenup use among non-wealthy Americans.

== Awards and recognition ==
- In 2023 Rodgers was named a Fastcase 50 honoree, an annual list recognizing innovation in law.
- In 2024 Suffolk University Law School named her Outstanding Graduate of the Last Decade.
- Rodgers was appointed to the Dean’s Cabinet advisory group at Suffolk Law.
- In 2025 she was included in Inc. magazine’s Female Founders 500 list.
