= J. Alphonse Nicholson =

American actor

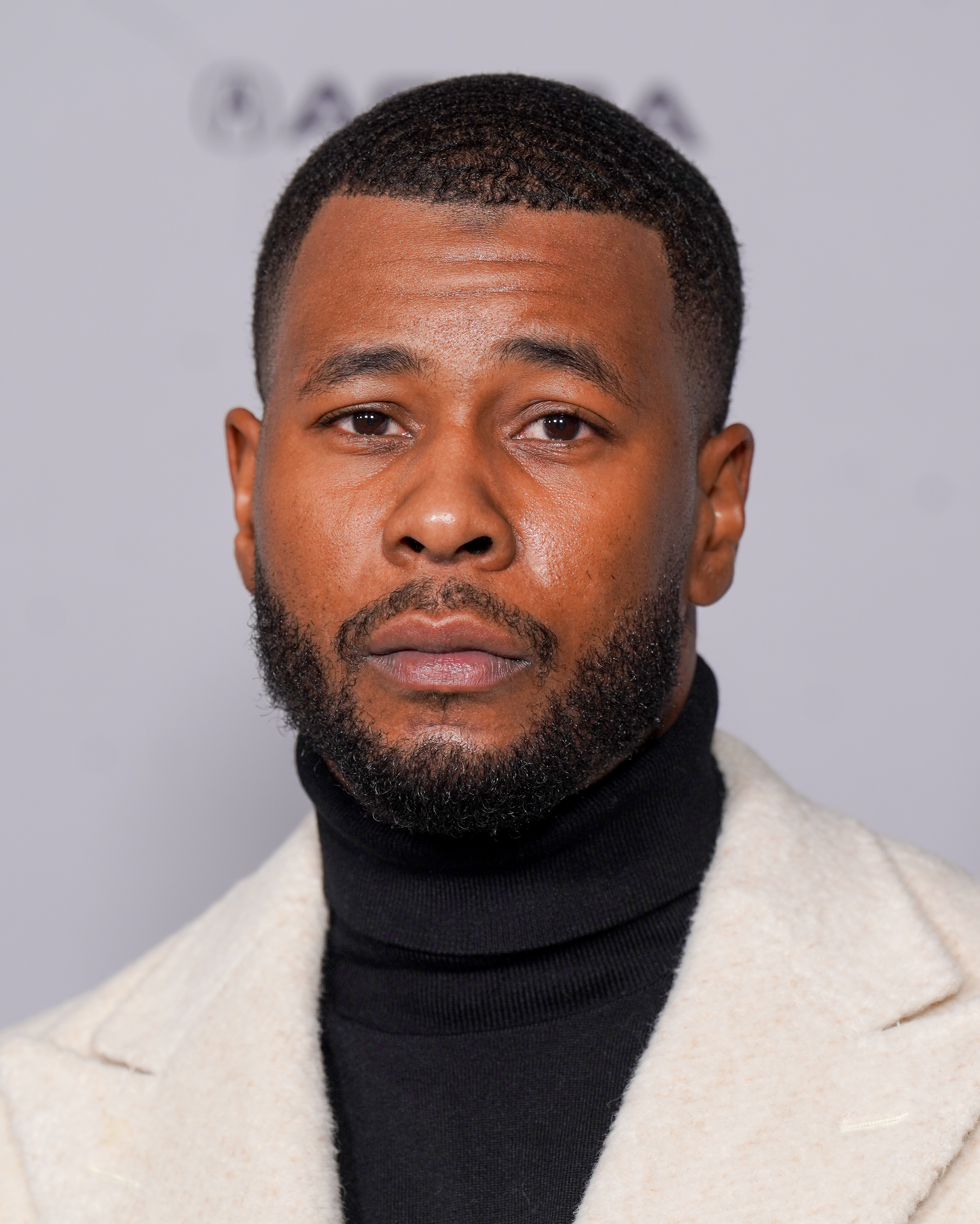
- Nicholson at the 2026 Sundance Film Festival
- Born: Greensboro, North Carolina, U.S
- Occupations: Actor, rapper, songwriter, producer
- Years active: 2013–present

J. Alphonse Nicholson is an American actor. He is known for playing the role of LaMarques in the Starz drama series P-Valley, for which he was nominated for the two NAACP Image Award for Outstanding Supporting Actor in a Drama Series, and John Stewart Sr. in Lanterns.

== Life and career ==
Nicholson was born in Greensboro, North Carolina. He began his career appearing in the local theater productions at PlayMakers Repertory Company before moving to New York. He began appearing on television playing guest-starring roles on Blue Bloods, Mr. Robot, Luke Cage, Shots Fired and The Blacklist. He made four appearances in BET anthology series, Tales from 2017 to 2022. In 2017 he made his off-Broadway debut in Freight: The Five Incarnations of Abel Greene, and later acted in Paradise Blue and Days of Rage. In 2020, Nicholson made his Broadway debut in revival of A Soldier's Play.

In 2020, Nicholson co-starred opposite Octavia Spencer in the Netflix miniseries, Self Made: Inspired by the Life of Madam C. J. Walker. Later that year he was cast in a series regular role in the Starz drama P-Valley. The role gained him two Black Reel Awards nominations and two NAACP Image Award for Outstanding Supporting Actor in a Drama Series nominations. In 2023, he appeared in the films White Men Can't Jump, They Cloned Tyrone and Wake. In 2024, he starred alongside Renée Elise Goldsberry and Lynn Whitfield in the drama film Albany Road and played Jimmy Raye II in the sports drama film, Black Spartans. He starred as Chris Paul in the miniseries Clipped.

== Filmography ==
=== Film ===
Year	Title	Role	Notes
2013	Don't Know Yet	Atlanta Hitchhiker	
2015	A Burial Hymn	Charlie	Short film
2017	Hit a Lick	Cheez	
2019	Perfectly Single	Terence	
2019	Just Mercy	Henry Davis	
2019	Steve	Busker / Drummer	Short film
2020	Before/During/After	Prospect Park Drummer	
2020	Wheels	Phil	
2021	Mother's Milk	Drummer Sparrow	
2023	Butterfly Boxing		Short film, also producer
2023	Southern Gospel	Barry	
2023	White Men Can't Jump	Jermaine	
2023	They Cloned Tyrone	Isaac	
2023	Wake	P-Mac	
2024	Albany Road	Kyle Henderson	
2026	If I Go Will They Miss Me	Big Ant	
TBA	Black Spartans	Jimmy Raye	Post-production
TBA	Miles & Juliette	Kenny "Klook" Clarke	Filming

=== Television ===
Year	Title	Role	Notes
2015	Blue Bloods	Schlenger	Episode: "Hold Outs"
2016	Mr. Robot	Andre	2 episodes
2016	Luke Cage	Darnell	Episode: "DWYCK"
2017	Shots Fired	Thaddeus Beck	2 episodes
2017–2022	Tales	Various	4 episodes
2018	The Blacklist	Vasilis	Episode: "The Informant (No. 118)"
2018	Chicago P.D.	Lamar Jenkins	Episode: "Breaking Point"
2020	FBI: Most Wanted	Tyrone 'Ty' Jackson	Episode: "Caesar"
2020	Self Made: Inspired by the Life of Madam C.J. Walker	John Robinson	Miniseries
2020–present	P-Valley	Lil' Murda	18 episodes
2024	Clipped	Chris Paul	5 episodes
2026	Lanterns	Young John Stewart Sr.	4 episodes
