= Kaye Singleton =

American actress

- Born: Florida, U.S.
- Occupations: Actress, Writer, Producer
- Years active: 2008-present

Kaye Singleton is an American actress and writer. She is known for her roles in the Bounce TV prime time soap opera, Saints & Sinners (2016–22), and BET prime time soap opera, The Oval (2021–present). In 2021, Singleton created and produced the Allblk anthology series, Covenant.

== Life and career ==
Kaye Singleton was born and raised in Florida and graduated from Georgia State University with a Bachelor of Business Administration in Marketing in 2004. Singleton later moved to Los Angeles and attended Stella Adler Studio of Acting and later moved to Atlanta to pursue full-time acting career. She began acting appearing in guest-starring roles on television series such as For Better or Worse, Being Mary Jane, The Quad, Star and Claws. She made her film debut appearing in the independent romantic comedy Breaking Up Is Hard to Do (2010), and later appeared in The Preacher's Son (2017) and Dumplin (2018).

From 2016 to 2022, Singleton had a recurring role as Josie in the Bounce TV prime time soap opera, Saints & Sinners. In 2019, Singleton starred in an episode of BET anthology series, Tales and later appeared on American Soul. She appeared in the romantic comedy film His, Hers and the Truth also that year. In early 2021 she co-starred alongside Keri Hilson in the romantic drama film, Don’t Waste Your Pretty. Later in 2021, Singleton created and executive produced the Allblk biblical anthology series, Covenant. Later in 2021, Singleton had a recurring role on BET comedy-drama, Sistas and joined the cast of BET prime time soap opera, The Oval.

== Filmography ==
=== Film ===
Year	Title	Role	Notes
2010	Breaking Up Is Hard to Do	Dominique	
2011	Linked-Up	Shanice Evans	Short film
2013	Saving Sudan	Emma Matthews	
2017	The Preacher's Son	Sister Susan	
2018	Dumplin'	Miss Burgundy	
2018	The Check List	Desiree	Short film, also writer and producer
2019	His, Hers & the Truth	Ashley	
2020	She Had to Ask	Addison	Short film
2021	Don't Waste Your Pretty	Amma	

=== Television ===
Year	Title	Role	Notes
2013	Blood Relatives	Crystal	Episode: "Lets Slay Together"
2013	For Better or Worse	Dr. Madson	Episode: "The Ex-"
2016–2022	Saints & Sinners	Josie	27 episodes
2017	Being Mary Jane	Carmen	Episode: "Getting Real"
2017	The Quad	Serena Miller	Episodes: "#ThingsFallApart" and "#Quicksand"
2017	Star	Boutique Manager	Episode: "May the Best Manager Win"
2019	Claws	Beautiful Black Woman	Episode: "Welcome to the Pleasuredome"
2019	Dear Santa, I Need a Date	Lori	Television film
2019	Tales	Sara	Episode: "Ex-Factor"
2020	American Soul	Ava Bradley	Episodes: "Ava Bradley" and "So Long, Sucker"
2021	Covenant	Serena Fuller	8 episodes, also creator and executive producer
2021	Sistas	Renee	4 episodes
2021–present	The Oval	Simone	Series regular
