= Allblk =

Internet video on demand service

ALLBLK
- Company type: Subsidiary
- Website type: VOD streaming service
- Available in: English
- Headquarters: Woodland Hills, California, US
- Area served: United States, Canada, the Caribbean
- Owners: Macro Media (2026-present); AMC Global Media (2014-2026); Robert L. Johnson (2014-2026)
- Founder: Robert L. Johnson
- Website: allblk.tv
- Launched: November 2014; 11 years ago

ALLBLK ("all-black"; stylized as ALLBLK or allblk; ALLWAYSBLK in Canada and the Caribbean; formerly Urban Movie Channel, UMC) is an over-the-top SVOD service operated by MACRO Media. It was formed as a joint venture between Robert L. Johnson (the founder of Black Entertainment Television) via RLJ Entertainment and AMC Global Media in November 2014. Macro Media acquired the streaming service in 2026.

The service features original movies and television series aimed at African American audiences, including live stand-up performances, documentaries and reality series, and stage plays.

On January 6, 2021, Urban Movie Channel relaunched as ALLBLK. The Canadian and Caribbean versions of the service remained under the UMC name until May 2022, when they rebranded as ALLWAYSBLK.

== Original programming ==
=== Drama ===
Title	Genre	Premiere	Seasons	Length	Status
5th Ward The Series	Drama	March 2, 2018	2 seasons, 12 episodes	40–65 min	Ended
Craig Ross Jr.'s Monogamy	Drama	May 4, 2018	3 seasons, 18 episodes	30–41 min	Ended
Bronx SIU	Action drama thriller	July 18, 2018	2 seasons, 14 episodes	29–55 min	Ended
40 and Single	Romance drama	October 10, 2018	1 season, 6 episodes	49–61 min	Ended
Jacqueline and Jilly	Drama	December 5, 2018	1 season, 6 episodes	22 min	Ended
A House Divided	Soap opera	July 18, 2019	5 seasons, 34 episodes	31–51 min	Ended
Stuck with You	Drama	February 12, 2020	2 seasons, 12 episodes	35–48 min	Ended
Double Cross	Crime drama	May 12, 2020	5 seasons, 30 episodes	30–42 min	Ended
Terror Lake Drive	Drama thriller anthology	July 19, 2020	3 seasons, 20 episodes	25–39 min	Ended
Covenant	Drama anthology	October 14, 2021	1 season, 8 episodes	26–41 min	Ended
Lace	Legal drama	November 4, 2021	2 seasons, 14 episodes	26–54 min	Ended
Hush	Drama	December 1, 2022	2 seasons, 16 episodes	29–38 min	Ended
Wicked City	Supernatural drama	December 1, 2022	3 seasons, 16 episodes	32–45 min	Ended
Snap	Psychological thriller anthology	December 22, 2022	1 season, 6 episodes	26–39 min	Ended
Judge Me Not	Legal drama	May 25, 2023	1 season, 8 episodes	36–45 min	Ended
Conspirators	Thriller	January 2, 2025	1 season, 8 episodes	28–33 min	Ended
Wild Rose	Crime thriller	March 12, 2026	1 season, 8 episodes	32–43 min	Pending
Jupiter Jones	Legal drama	May 7, 2026	1 season, 8 episodes	32–41 min	Pending
D.O.P.E. Unit	Crime drama	August 6, 2026	1 season, 8 episodes	35–42 min	Pending

=== Comedy ===
Title	Genre	Premiere	Seasons	Length	Status
Makeup X Breakup	Comedy drama	September 13, 2016	3 seasons, 22 episodes	21–33 min	Ended
The Rich and the Ruthless	Satire	July 28, 2017	3 seasons, 18 episodes	18–31 min	Ended (Note: Moved to BET+.)
Minimum Wage	Comedy	September 30, 2017	1 season, 6 episodes	22–23 min	Ended
Ladies of the Law	Comedy	October 31, 2018	1 season, 6 episodes	22–31 min	Ended
For the Love of Jason	Romantic comedy	November 11, 2020	2 seasons, 12 episodes	24–26 min	Ended
Millennials	Sitcom	February 25, 2021	2 seasons, 12 episodes	34–37 min	Ended
Partners in Rhyme	Comedy	November 18, 2021	2 seasons, 15 episodes	27–38 min	Ended
À La Carte	Comedy drama	May 12, 2022	2 seasons, 16 episodes	30–35 min	Ended
Send Help	Dark comedy	August 11, 2022	1 season, 7 episodes	25–34 min	Ended
G.R.I.T.S.	Comedy drama	October 30, 2025	1 season, 6 episodes	35–43 min	Pending

=== Unscripted ===
==== Docuseries ====
Title	Subject	Premiere	Seasons	Length	Status
Naked Hustle	Strip clubs	August 1, 2018	6 episodes	26–29 min	Miniseries
Behind Her Faith	Celebrity/Faith	March 25, 2020	1 season, 4 episodes	23–25 min	Ended
A Closer Look	Music	November 5, 2020	1 season, 6 episodes	50–57 min	Ended
Supa Girlz	Dance	March 7, 2024	6 episodes	41–56 min	Miniseries

==== Reality ====
Title	Genre	Premiere	Seasons	Runtime	Status
Trash vs Treasure	Reality	July 15, 2018	1 season, 3 episodes	42–50 min	Ended
My Mane Problem	Reality	March 3, 2021	2 seasons, 14 episodes	26–30 min	Ended
Notorious Queens	Reality	March 31, 2021	1 season, 6 episodes	42–48 min	Ended

==== Variety ====
Title	Genre	Premiere	Seasons	Runtime	Status
Social Society	Talk show	February 21, 2021	2 seasons, 36 episodes	45–61 min	Ended

=== Stand-up comedy ===
Title	Premiere	Seasons	Runtime	Status
Comedy Underground	December 31, 2013	2 seasons, 8 episodes	31–70 min	Ended

=== Co-productions ===
Title	Genre	Partner	Premiere	Seasons	Length	Status
Omega: The Gift & The Curse	Music docuseries	WE tv	March 6, 2023	5 episodes	31–36 min	Miniseries

=== Continuations ===
Title	Genre	Prev. network(s)	Premiere	Seasons	Runtime	Status
Kold x Windy (season 2)	Drama	WE tv	August 8, 2024	1 season, 7 episodes	37–42 min	Ended

=== Specials ===
These programs are one-time original events or supplementary content related to original TV shows.

Title	Genre	Premiere	Length
Lil Duval: Living My Best Life	Stand-up comedy	May 21, 2021	57 min
Gary "G-Thang" Johnson: Sitcho Ass Down	Stand-up comedy	May 30, 2024	63 min
