= Legacy (2023 American TV series) =

- Genre: Crime drama
- Created by: Manny Halley
- Developed by: Manny Halley
- Starring: Ving Rhames; Barton Fitzpatrick; Adrienne-Joi Johnson; Markice Moore; Andra Fuller; Draya Michele; Justin Martin; Jeremy Meeks; Clifton Powell; Lawrence Hilton Jacobs; LisaRaye McCoy
- Composer: Chris Paultre
- Country of origin: United States
- Original language: English
- No. of seasons: 1
- No. of episodes: 3

Production
- Executive producers: Manny Halley; Yolanda Halley; Marvin Neil; Mishi Crowe
- Producers: Manny Halley; Rodney Turner II; Yolanda Halley; Denee Busby Howard
- Editor: Salvatore Sclafani
- Camera setup: Single-camera
- Production companies: Faith Media Distribution; Manny Halley Productions

Original release
- Network: BET+
- Release: March 2, 2023

Legacy is an American crime drama miniseries that premiered on March 2, 2023, on BET+.

== Cast and characters ==
- Ving Rhames as Guy Simmons
  - Justin Martin as young Guy Simmons
- Barton Fitzpatrick as Vee
- Adrienne-Joi Johnson as Gloria Simmons
- Markice Moore as Ty Simmons
- Andra Fuller as Kevin Simmons
- Draya Michele as Kat
- Jeremy Meeks as Tito Bell
- Tyler Abron as Karin
- Clifton Powell as Hawk
- Lawrence Hilton Jacobs as Brah Hardy
  - Chris Kusiappouh as young Brah Hardy
- LisaRaye McCoy as Debra Simmons
- Christian P. Campbell as Mike G
- Earnest Brown as Special
- Donovan W. Carter as Banks
- Jaclyn Chantel as Salima
- David Terrell as Willie Pop-Pop Simmons
- Alfonso Caballero as Detective Jason
- Michael Petrone as Nate
- Jermaine Alverez Martin as Young Hardy

== Episodes ==
No.	Title	Directed by	Written by	Original release date	BET air date	U.S. linear viewers (millions)
1	"Our Father's Keeper"	Jamal Hill	Manny Halley & Yolanda Halley	March 2, 2023	March 18, 2025	N/A
2	"Aftermath"	Erik White	Manny Halley & Yolanda Halley	March 2, 2023	March 25, 2025	N/A
3	"Never The Same"	Erik White	Manny Halley & Yolanda Halley	March 2, 2023	April 1, 2025	N/A
