= Basketball Wives LA season 1 =

Basketball Wives LA
- Season 1
- Cover used by the iTunes Store
- Starring: Draya Michele; Imani Showalter; Malaysia Pargo; Tanya Williams; Kimsha Artest; Laura Govan; Gloria Govan; Jackie Christie
- No. of episodes: 14

Release
- Original network: VH1
- Original release: August 29 – November 28, 2011

Season chronology
- Next → Season 2

The first season of the reality television series Basketball Wives LA aired on VH1 from August 29, 2011 until November 28, 2011. It follows the lives of a group of women who have all been somehow romantically linked to professional basketball players.

It was executively produced by Pam Healey, Sean Rankine, Amanda Scott, Shaunie O'Neal, Mark Seliga, and Lisa Shannon.

== Production ==
Basketball Wives LA was revealed on June 20, 2011, with Kimsha Artest, Gloria Govan, Laura Govan, Jackie Christie and Imani Showalter as the cast. Malaysia Pargo and Draya Michele were announced as part of the cast in the series' July 2011 press release. Kimsha Artest stopped showing up for filming because she did not agree with the "shenanigans and drama", which explains why she was not featured in more than one episode. Tanya Williams was to be the eighth official "wife" but left the series after two episodes. The series premiered on August 29, 2011, to 1.81 million viewers.

== Cast ==
=== Main ===
- Draya Howard: Model/Actress
- Imani Showalter: Ex-Fiancée of Stephen Jackson
- Gloria Govan: Girlfriend of Matt Barnes
- Laura Govan: Gloria’s sister
- Malaysia Pargo: Wife of Jannero Pargo
- Tanya Young Williams: Wife of Jayson Williams
- Kimsha Artest: Partner of Ron Artest
- Jackie Christie: Wife of Doug Christie

== Episodes ==
No. overall	No. in season	Title	Original release date	U.S. viewers (millions)
1	1	"Series Premiere"	August 29, 2011	1.81
In the series premiere, a fresh group of West Coast basketball wives, girlfriends, fiancees and exes deal with life in SoCal's hottest hub for gossip and game
2	2	"Episode 2"	September 5, 2011	1.70
After a rooftop altercation between Malaysia and Laura, Tanya finds herself the surprise recipient of the group's disdain
3	3	"Episode 3"	September 12, 2011	1.31
Jackie prepares for her annual renewal of vows to Doug Christie, but will Draya make the cut for an invite? Also, Jackie's bachelorette party nearly boils over when some surprise guests turn up the heat.
4	4	"Episode 4"	September 19, 2011	1.47
Love is in the air at Jackie and Doug Christie's Vegas wedding, the 16th time they have tied the knot, but feathers are ruffled when one of the girls goes AWOL.
5	5	"Episode 5"	September 26, 2011	1.72
The group takes Draya to task over sitting out Jackie's wedding, and Imani's frustration with the single life results in a new resolve to get back in the game.
6	6	"Episode 6"	October 3, 2011	1.56
Laura's issues with Draya turn the group's recreational MMa outing into a major showdown.
7	7	"Episode 7"	October 10, 2011	1.16
After reaching out to Malaysia, Draya is confused when Jackie suddenly decides she's her new best buddy.
8	8	"Episode 8"	October 17, 2011	1.29
Jackie's penchant for gossip begins to wear on the girls. Also, a trip to Oakland has Gloria wondering about the future of her relationship with Matt.
9	9	"Episode 9"	October 24, 2011	1.73
Matt and Gloria's charity golf event provides the backdrop for mounting friction between Draya and Laura
10	10	"Episode 10"	October 31, 2011	1.29
The ladies are off to Hawaii for some fun in the sun, but the revelation that Jackie's been pitting them against each other heats up more than ever.
11	11	"Episode 11"	November 7, 2011	1.99
There's trouble in paradise as tempers flare and the ladies decide to call Jackie out on what they believe she's been saying behind their backs.Will the friction put an early end to the ladies' vacation in Hawaii
12	12	"Season Finale"	November 14, 2011	2.18
Jackie's attempt to reconcile with the girls doesn't go as planned. Also, Matt and Gloria's relationship takes a turn no one saw coming.
13	13	"Reunion: Part 1"	November 21, 2011	2.26
The girls reunite as host John Salley examines topics including Draya's haunted past, friction between Laura and Draya, and the current state of Matt and Gloria's relationship.
14	14	"Reunion: Part 2"	November 28, 2011	2.32
Host John Salley explores the ladies' blowout with Jackie Christie and the tumultuous end to the series' debut season. This episode marks the final appearances of Kimsha, Imani, and Tanya
