= Basketball Wives LA season 2 =

Basketball Wives LA
- Season 2
- Cover used by ITunes Store
- Starring: Draya Michele; Brooke Bailey; Malaysia Pargo; Laura Govan; Gloria Govan; Jackie Christie
- No. of episodes: 16

Release
- Original network: VH1
- Original release: September 10 – December 17, 2012

Season chronology
- ← Previous; Season 1 Next → Season 3

The second season of the reality television series Basketball Wives LA aired on VH1 from September 10, 2012 until December 17, 2012. It follows the lives of a group of women who have all been somehow romantically linked to professional basketball players.

It was executively produced by Pam Healey, Sean Rankine, Amanda Scott, Shaunie O'Neal, Mark Seliga, and Lisa Shannon.

== Production ==
Basketball Wives LA was revealed on June 20, 2011, with Kimsha Artest, Gloria Govan, Laura Govan, Jackie Christie and Imani Showalter as the cast. Malaysia Pargo and Draya Michele were announced as part of the cast in the series' July 2011 press release. Kimsha Artest stopped showing up for filming because she did not agree with the "shenanigans and drama", which explains why she was not featured in more than one episode. Tanya Williams was to be the eighth official "wife" but left the series after two episodes. The series premiered on August 29, 2011, to 1.81 million viewers.

The second season of Basketball Wives LA debuted on September 10, 2012, with the premiere attracting 1.82 million viewers. Imani Showalter did not return because she felt that reality television wasn't for her, and she moved back to New York. Brooke Bailey joined as a main cast member, with Adiz "Bambi" Benson joining in a recurring role.

== Cast ==
=== Main ===
- Draya Michele: Model/Actress
- Brooke Bailey: Girlfriend of Vernon Macklin
- Gloria Govan: Wife of Matt Barnes
- Laura Govan: Gloria's sister
- Malaysia Pargo: Wife of Jannero Pargo
- Jackie Christie: Wife of Doug Christie

=== Recurring ===
- Bambi Benson: Malaysia's Friend

== Episodes ==
No. overall	No. in season	Title	Original release date	U.S. viewers (millions)
15	1	"Season Premiere"	September 10, 2012	1.82
In the season two premiere, Malaysia's desire to bring Jackie back into the group has the ladies baffled. Also Laura and Gloria find that despite being sisters, they've grown apart. Brooke Bailey is added to the opening credits replacing departing cast members Imani Showalter, Kimsha Artest, and Tanya Williams
16	2	"Episode 2"	September 17, 2012	1.45
Jackie's surprise appearance at Gloria's cooking party leaves a bad taste in everyone mouth. Gloria lands a plum acting role and Draya's behavior at a photo shoot irks newcomer Brooke.
17	3	"Episode 3"	September 24, 2012	1.53
Jackie's unique wedding plans and new tattoo raise eyebrows. A phone call to Gloria test Draya and Jackie's friendships.
18	4	"Episode 4"	October 1, 2012	1.29
The ladies gather for a pool party, but Draya's short temper sets Jackie off over the issue of respect. Malaysia flubs a voice over session and decides that overcoming her shyness is a top priority.
19	5	"Episode 5"	October 8, 2012	1.20
The Christie's forge ahead with their gay-themed wedding, Gloria and Laura have a wrenching heart-to-heart about growing distant, and Draya finally reaches her boiling point with Jackie.
20	6	"Episode 6"	October 15, 2012	1.71
Tensions between Jackie and Draya hot an all-time high. Some of the other ladies consider not showing up for Jackie's upcoming annual wedding.
21	7	"Episode 7"	October 22, 2012	1.56
Bambi confronts Laura on her treatment of Jackie. Also, Jackie and Doug's gay-themed wedding spectacular is nearly upstaged by one of the wives' choice of attire.
22	8	"Episode 8"	October 29, 2012	2.10
A surprise blowout at Laura and Gloria's mixology event shocks the group, and Jackie and Doug Christie's trip to Seattle gets off to a rough start when Jackie and her daughters get real during a visit with a family therapist.
23	9	"Episode 9"	November 5, 2012	1.84
Jackie's suspicious of Laura's desire to speak with her daughters while in Seattle, and Draya, Brooke and Gloria's good time back in L.A. is interrupted by news of Matt's arrest.
24	10	"Episode 10"	November 12, 2012	2.02
It's hell on wheels at Malaysia's 80's-themed roller skating party when Laura is confronted about her treatment of Jackie. Also, Gloria shoots an explosive scene from her web series and the girls discuss an upcoming trip to NYC.
25	11	"Episode 11"	November 19, 2012	1.83
Good news for Brooke means bad news for her relationship with Draya. Also, Bambi reacts when Gloria shuts her down during an argument.
26	12	"Episode 12"	November 26, 2012	1.93
The ladies head to the Big Apple to walk the runway for Jackie's clothing line. It's not just flash bulbs and champagne corks popping when Draya bails on a party to celebrate Brooke landing a major magazine cover.
27	13	"Episode 13"	December 3, 2012	1.86
The ladies plot a trip to New Orleans, but when Bambi's ire towards Gloria ruins Laura's birthday plans, no one knows what to expect.
28	14	"Season Finale"	December 10, 2012	1.77
The heat's turned up in the Big Easy as the ladies' season-ending trip to New Orleans goes sideways when Jackie discovers that Laura has spoken with her daughter.
29	15	"Reunion: Part 1"	December 10, 2012	2.20
John Salley returns to host the season two reunion. In this first hour, Jackie and Laura show they haven't overcome their differences and Gloria makes a bold declaration about her place in the BBWLA universe.
30	16	"Reunion: Part 2"	December 17, 2012	1.89
In the second and final hour of the season two reunion, the girls reveal who each of them would like to see booted from the show and discuss where things stand after their season finale showdown in New Orleans. This episode marks the final appearance of Laura, Gloria, and Bambi
