= The Chi =

American drama television series (2018–26)

- Genre: Drama
- Created by: Lena Waithe
- Starring: Jason Mitchell; Ntare Guma Mbaho Mwine; Jacob Latimore; Alex R. Hibbert; Tiffany Boone; Yolonda Ross; Armando Riesco; Rolando Boyce; Barton Fitzpatrick; Shamon Brown Jr.; Michael V. Epps; Birgundi Baker; Luke James; Curtiss Cook; Lynn Whitfield; Hannaha Hall; Jason Weaver
- Composer: Patrick Warren
- Country of origin: United States
- Original language: English
- No. of seasons: 8
- No. of episodes: 88

Production
- Executive producers: Lena Waithe; Common; Elwood Reid; Aaron Kaplan; Rick Famuyiwa; Ayanna Floyd Davis; Justin Hillian; Jet Wilkinson; Shelby Stone; Derek Dudley; Jacob Latimore; Birgundi Baker
- Camera setup: Single-camera
- Running time: 46–58 minutes
- Production companies: Hillman Grad Productions; Elwood Reid Inc.; Freedom Road Productions; Uncut Gems; id8 mm.; Hillianaire Productions; Verse Productions; Kapital Entertainment; 20th Television (Note: Known as Fox 21 Television Studios and Touchstone Television for the first three seasons.); Paramount Television Studios (Note: Known as Showtime Networks for seasons 1-7; although the logo of said company still appeared in the final season, Paramount Television Studios served as a byline respectively.)

Original release
- Network: Showtime
- Release: January 7, 2018 – September 4, 2022
- Network: Paramount+ with Showtime
- Release: August 4, 2023 – August 1, 2025
- Network: Paramount+ Premium
- Release: May 22 – July 24, 2026

The Chi (/ˈʃaɪ/ SHY) is an American drama television series created by Lena Waithe about life in a neighborhood on the South Side of Chicago. In May 2024, the series was renewed for a seventh season; which premiered on May 18, 2025. In May 2025, the series was renewed for an eighth season. Five months later, it was announced that the eighth season would be the final season. The eighth and final season premiered on May 22, 2026 on Paramount+ Premium.

== Premise ==
The Chi is described as following "a fateful turn of events that sends shockwaves through a community on the Southside of Chicago and connects the lives of Emmett, Brandon, Ronnie and Kevin in unexpected ways."

== Cast ==
Name	Portrayed by	Seasons							
Name	Portrayed by	1	2	3	4	5	6	7	8
Brandon Johnson	Jason Mitchell	Main							
Ronnie Davis	Ntare Mwine	Main							
Emmett Washington	Jacob Latimore	Main							
Kevin Williams	Alex R. Hibbert	Main							
Jerrika Little	Tiffany Boone	Main							
Jada Washington	Yolonda Ross	Main							
Detective Armando Cruz	Armando Riesco	Main							
Darnell Carway	Rolando Boyce		Main						
Reg Taylor	Barton Fitzpatrick	Recurring	Main					Main	
Stanley "Papa" Jackson II	Shamon Brown Jr.	Recurring	Main						
Jake Taylor	Michael V. Epps	Recurring	Main						
Kiesha Williams	Birgundi Baker	Recurring		Main					
Victor "Trig" Taylor	Luke James			Recurring	Main				
Otis "Douda" Perry	Curtiss Cook		Recurring		Main				
Alicia	Lynn Whitfield						Recurring	Main	
Tiffany "Tiff"	Hannaha Hall	Recurring							Main
Rashaad "Shaad" Marshall	Jason Weaver				Recurring				Main

=== Main ===
- Jason Mitchell as Brandon Johnson (seasons 1–2)
- Ntare Mwine as Ronnie Davis (seasons 1–3)
- Jacob Latimore as Emmett Washington
- Alex R. Hibbert as Kevin Williams (seasons 1–6, guest season 8)
- Tiffany Boone as Jerrika Little (seasons 1–2), Brandon's girlfriend
- Yolonda Ross as Jada Washington (seasons 1–7), Emmett's mother
- Armando Riesco as Detective Cruz (seasons 1–2), a South Side detective
- Rolando Boyce as Darnell Carway (seasons 2–8), Emmett's father
- Barton Fitzpatrick as Reg Taylor (seasons 2 and 7–8; recurring season 1), Trig's younger brother, Jake's older brother and reckless gang leader
- Shamon Brown Jr. as Stanley "Papa" Jackson II (seasons 2–8; recurring season 1), Kevin and Jake's friend
- Michael V. Epps as Jake Taylor (seasons 2–8; recurring season 1), Kevin and Papa's best friend and Trig and Reg's younger brother
- Birgundi Baker as Kiesha Williams (seasons 3–8; recurring seasons 1–2), Kevin's older sister and Emmett's girlfriend
- Luke James as Victor "Trig" Taylor (seasons 4–8; recurring season 3), Reg and Jake's estranged gangster older brother
- Curtiss Cook as Otis "Douda" Perry (seasons 4–6; recurring seasons 2–3), the leader of the 63rd Street Mob
- Lynn Whitfield as Alicia (season 7; recurring season 6), Quentin and Sonny's powerful younger sister
- Hannaha Hall as Tiffany "Tiff" (season 8; recurring seasons 1–7), the mother of Emmett's third child, EJ
- Jason Weaver as Rashaad "Shaad" Marshall (season 8; recurring seasons 4–7), Trig's best friend

=== Recurring ===
- Lucien Cambric as Jason Roxboro (season 1), "Q" and Tracy's son who is also Ronnie's stepson
- Jahking Guillory as Charles Frederick "Coogie" Johnson (seasons 1 and 5–6), Brandon's younger brother
- Brian King as Detective Wallace (season 1), a corrupted detective
- Steven Williams as Quentin "Q" Dickinson (seasons 1 and 5), a kingpin elder of the 63rd Street Mob and Trice's mentor
- Tosin Morohunfola as Trice (season 1), the underboss of the 63rd Street Mob
- Byron Bowers as Meldrick (season 1), a psychic gangster
- Sonja Sohn as Laverne Johnson (seasons 1 and 3–4), Brandon's mother
- Cedric Young as Sonny (seasons 1–3), Q's and Alicia's brother who is also Emmett's boss
- LaDonna Tittle as Ethel Davis (seasons 1–3), Ronnie's grandmother
- Tyla Abercrumbie as Nina Williams (seasons 1–6), Kevin and Keisha's overbearing mother
- Sherrice Eaglin as Vanessa "Peaches" Taylor (seasons 5–6; guest season 3) Jake, Trig and Reg's mother who is a recovering heroin addict
- José Antonio García as Mr. Gasca (seasons 1–2), Kevin's teacher
- Genesis Denise Hale as Maisha, Kevin's love interest and Andrea's cousin
- Mariah Gordon as Andrea (season 1), Kevin's first crush
- Chris Lee as Hannibal (seasons 1–3 and 6–7), Brandon and Rob's cousin
- Tai Davis as Tracy Roxboro (seasons 1–7), Jason's mother
- Common as Rafiq (seasons 1–2)
- Crystal Dickinson as Detective Alice Toussaint (seasons 2 and 7; guest season 6), a mob-obsessed detective
- Miriam A. Hyman as Dre (seasons 3–6), Nina's wife who is a high school counselor
- Jasmine Davis as Imani (seasons 3–4), Trig's love interest
- La La Anthony as Dominque "Dom" Morris (seasons 3–7), Jamal's wife and co-owner of Smokey's BBQ
- Cortez Smith as Isiah "Nuck" Rogers (seasons 3–8), Douda's former right-hand man who kills Douda and takes over as new leader of the 63rd Street Mob
- Judae'a Brown as Jemma (seasons 3–8), Jake's love interest and Kevin's former girlfriend
- Kandi Burruss as Roselyn Perry (seasons 3–7), Douda's estranged wife
- Lena Waithe as Camille Hallaway (season 3), Douda's rival mayoral candidate
- Lil Rel Howery as Zeke Remnick (season 3), Sonny's landlord
- L'lerrét Jazelle as Fatima (seasons 5–8), Victor's love interest
- Ahmad Ferguson as Bakari (seasons 3–8), Lynae's love interest and member of the 63rd Street Mob
- Tabitha Brown as Octavia (season 4)
- Vic Mensa as Jamal (seasons 4 and 6), Lynae's older brother who is a former gangster
- Da Brat as LaPorsha (seasons 4 and 6), Nina's new love interest
- Cory Hardrict as Dante (seasons 3–7), Tiff's fling
- Zaria Imani Primer as Lynae (seasons 4–8), Jamal's younger sister and Bakari's love interest
- Iman Shumpert as Rob (seasons 4–6), Tiff's love interest
- Amari Ferguson as Britney (season 6), Bakari's sister
- Kadeem Hardison as Professor Gardner (seasons 6–7), Lynae's college professor
- Jill Marie Jones as Bianca (seasons 6–7), Douda's lover
- Leon Robinson as Alonzo (season 6), Alicia's ex-husband and Rob's father
- Kennedy Amaya as Kenya (seasons 6–8), Papa's love interest and Zay's lover
- Aaron Guy as Zay (seasons 6–7), Nuck's cousin and Kenya's lover
- Daniel J. Watts as Pastor Zeke (seasons 6–7), Kenya's father
- Brett Gray as Damien (seasons 6–7), Darnell's son and Emmett's half-brother
- Rotimi as Charles (seasons 7–8; guest season 6), a former assistant of Pastor Zeke, who returns to church for a second chance
- Wendy Raquel Robinson as Riley Dalton (seasons 7–8), Darnell's new love interest
- Joel Steingold as Marcus St. John (seasons 3–7), Jemma's father
- Karrueche Tran as Zuri (seasons 7–8), Damien's love interest
- Reagan Gomez-Preston as Candice (seasons 7–8), Reg's new love interest
- Tammy Townsend as Nora (seasons 7–8), Rashaad's new love interest
- Liza Jessie Peterson as Patience (season 8), Rashaad's lawyer and new love interest

== Episodes ==
Season	Episodes		Originally released		
Season	Episodes		First released	Last released	Network
1	10		January 7, 2018 (Note: Episodes 1 and 2 were released early online on December 15, 2017, and on January 7, 2018, respectively.)	March 18, 2018	Showtime
2	10		April 7, 2019 (Note: Episode 1 was released early online on April 4, 2019.)	June 16, 2019	Showtime
3	10		June 21, 2020	August 23, 2020	Showtime
4	10		May 23, 2021 (Note: Episode 1 was released early online on May 21, 2021.)	August 1, 2021	Showtime
5	10		June 26, 2022 (Note: Episode 1 was released early online on June 24, 2022.)	September 4, 2022	Showtime
6 (Note: Episodes were released two days later on Showtime.)	16	8	August 4, 2023	September 22, 2023	Paramount+ with Showtime
6	16	8	May 10, 2024	June 28, 2024	Paramount+ with Showtime
7	12		May 16, 2025	August 1, 2025	Paramount+ with Showtime
8	10		May 22, 2026	July 24, 2026	Paramount+ Premium

=== Season 1 (2018) ===
No. overall	No. in season	Title	Directed by	Written by	Original release date	Prod. code	U.S. viewers (millions)
1	1	"Pilot"	Rick Famuyiwa	Lena Waithe	January 7, 2018	1BEO78	0.533
2	2	"Alee"	David Rodriguez	Elwood Reid & Lena Waithe	January 14, 2018	1BEO02	0.570
3	3	"Ghosts"	David Rodriguez	Adam Glass & Ayanna Floyd Davis	January 21, 2018	1BEO03	0.707
4	4	"Quaking Grass"	Tanya Hamilton	Story by : Elwood Reid & Mike Flynn; Teleplay by : Elwood Reid & Justin Hillian	January 28, 2018	1BEO04	0.751
5	5	"Today Was a Good Day"	Darren Grant	Marcus Gardley	February 11, 2018	1BEO05	0.679
6	6	"Penetrate a Fraud"	Roxann Dawson	Casallina Kisakye	February 18, 2018	1BEO06	0.673
7	7	"The Whistle"	David Rodriguez	Lena Waithe & Dime Davis	February 25, 2018	1BEO07	0.791
8	8	"Wallets"	Tanya Hamilton	Adam Glass & Marcus Gardley	March 4, 2018	1BEO08	0.675
9	9	"Namaste Muthafucka"	Zetna Fuentes	Adam Glass & Sylvia L. Jones	March 11, 2018	1BEO09	0.797
10	10	"Ease on Down the Road"	Justin Tipping	Elwood Reid	March 18, 2018	1BEO10	0.872

=== Season 2 (2019) ===
No. overall	No. in season	Title	Directed by	Written by	Original release date	Prod. code	U.S. viewers (millions)
11	1	"Eruptions"	Jet Wilkinson	Ayanna Floyd Davis & Lena Waithe	April 7, 2019	2BEO01	0.454
12	2	"Every Day I'm Hustlin'"	Darren Grant	Joe Wilson	April 14, 2019	2BEO02	0.375
13	3	"Past Due"	Justin Tipping	J. David Shanks	April 21, 2019	2BEO03	0.339
14	4	"Showdown"	Carl Seaton	Casallina Kisakye	April 28, 2019	2BEO04	0.392
15	5	"Feeling the Heat"	Jet Wilkinson	Ayanna Floyd Davis & Joe Wilson	May 5, 2019	2BEO05	0.439
16	6	"A Leg Up"	Cheryl Dunye	Justin Hillian & Dime Davis	May 12, 2019	2BEO06	0.397
17	7	"A Blind Eye"	Rebecca Rodriguez	Cinque Henderson & J. David Shanks	May 26, 2019	2BEO07	0.350
18	8	"Lean Into It"	Salli Richardson-Whitfield	Terri Kopp	June 2, 2019	2BEO08	0.328
19	9	"Guilt, Viral Videos, and Ass Whuppings"	Tanya Hamilton	Joe Wilson	June 9, 2019	2BEO09	0.427
20	10	"The Scorpion and the Frog"	Jet Wilkinson	Ayanna Floyd Davis	June 16, 2019	2BEO10	0.474

=== Season 3 (2020) ===
No. overall	No. in season	Title	Directed by	Written by	Original release date	Prod. code	U.S. viewers (millions)
21	1	"Foe 'Nem"	Jet Wilkinson	Lena Waithe & Justin Hillian	June 21, 2020	3BEO01	0.348
22	2	"Brewfurd"	Rashaad Ernesto Green	Marcus Gardley	June 28, 2020	3BEO02	0.347
23	3	"Buss Down"	Gandja Monteiro	Lolis Eric Elie	July 5, 2020	3BEO03	0.351
24	4	"Gangway"	Jet Wilkinson	T.J. Brady & Rasheed Newson	July 12, 2020	3BEO04	0.367
25	5	"Terror Town"	Jet Wilkinson	Ricardo Gamboa & Nambi E. Kelley	July 19, 2020	3BEO05	0.438
26	6	"Woo Woo Woo"	Darren Grant	Jewel McPherson	July 26, 2020	3BEO06	0.525
27	7	"A Stain"	Sam Bailey	Marcus Gardley & Jade Branion	August 2, 2020	3BEO07	0.415
28	8	"Frunchroom"	Jet Wilkinson	Justin Hillian	August 9, 2020	3BEO08	0.430
29	9	"Lackin'"	Alonso Alvarez Barreda	T.J. Brady & Rasheed Newson	August 16, 2020	3BEO09	0.384
30	10	"A Couple, Two, Three"	Rebecca Rodriguez	Justin Hillian & Jewel McPherson	August 23, 2020	3BEO10	0.382

=== Season 4 (2021) ===
No. overall	No. in season	Title	Directed by	Written by	Original release date	Prod. code	U.S. viewers (millions)
31	1	"Soul Food"	Gandja Monteiro	Lena Waithe & Justin Hillian	May 23, 2021	4BEO01	0.335
32	2	"Cooley High"	Gandja Monteiro	Jewel Coronel	May 30, 2021	4BEO02	0.404
33	3	"Native Son"	Samir Rehem	Patrik-Ian Polk	June 6, 2021	4BEO03	0.310
34	4	"The Girl from Chicago"	Samir Rehem	Resheida Brady	June 13, 2021	4BEO04	0.284
35	5	"The Spook Who Sat by the Door"	Gandja Monteiro	Ricardo Gamboa	June 20, 2021	4BEO05	0.235
36	6	"Candyman"	Nancy C. Mejía	James Rogers III	June 27, 2021	4BEO06	0.284
37	7	"...Black Messiah"	Kimi Howl Lee	Jewel Coronel & Kristiana Rae Colón	July 11, 2021	4BEO07	0.253
38	8	"Love Jones"	Katrelle N. Kindred	Justin Hillian & Resheida Brady	July 18, 2021	4BEO08	0.324
39	9	"Southside with You"	Nancy C. Mejía	Jewel Coronel & Deonte' Staats	July 25, 2021	4BEO09	0.258
40	10	"A Raisin in the Sun"	Gandja Monteiro	Justin Hillian	August 1, 2021	4BEO10	0.289

=== Season 5 (2022) ===
No. overall	No. in season	Title	Directed by	Written by	Original release date	Prod. code	U.S. viewers (millions)
41	1	"Overnight Celebrity"	Nancy C. Mejía	Lena Waithe & Justin Hillian	June 26, 2022	5BEO01	0.152
42	2	"Oh Girl"	Katrelle N. Kindred	Jewel Coronel	July 3, 2022	5BEO02	0.187
43	3	"This Christmas"	Katrelle N. Kindred	Resheida Brady	July 10, 2022	5BEO03	0.209
44	4	"On Me"	Deondray Gossfield & Quincy LeNear Gossfield	Kristiana Rae Colón	July 17, 2022	5BEO04	0.235
45	5	"We Don't Have to Take Our Clothes Off"	Boma Iluma	Ricardo Gamboa	July 24, 2022	5BEO05	0.249
46	6	"Bring It on Home to Me"	Cierra 'Shooter' Glaudé	Shaye Ogbonna	July 31, 2022	5BEO06	0.203
47	7	"Angels"	Cierra 'Shooter' Glaudé	Mia Brumfield & Jewel Coronel	August 7, 2022	5BEO07	0.196
48	8	"Sweet Thing"	Nancy C. Mejía	Resheida Brady	August 14, 2022	5BEO08	0.207
49	9	"I'm Looking for a New Thing"	Marvin Lemus	Ricardo Gamboa	August 28, 2022	5BEO09	0.218
50	10	"I Am the Blues"	Nancy C. Mejía	Jewel Coronel	September 4, 2022	5BEO10	0.148

=== Season 6 (2023–24) ===
No. overall	No. in season	Title	Directed by	Written by	Original release date	Prod. code	U.S. viewers (millions)
Part 1
51	1	"New Chi City"	Nancy C. Mejía	Lena Waithe & Justin Hillian	August 4, 2023	6BEO01	0.192
52	2	"Mo' Douda, Mo' Problems"	Johnson Cheng	Jewel Coronel	August 11, 2023	6BEO02	0.196
53	3	"House Party"	Rashaad Ernesto Green	Resheida Brady & Mia A. Brumfield	August 18, 2023	6BEO03	0.151
54	4	"ReUp"	Anthony Shim	Kristiana Rae Colón	August 25, 2023	6BEO04	0.169
55	5	"One of Them Nights"	Johnson Cheng	Racquel Baker	September 1, 2023	6BEO05	0.170
56	6	"Boyz II Men"	Shanrica Evans	Whitney Beckwith & Jewel Coronel	September 8, 2023	6BEO06	0.117
57	7	"Long Live"	Boma Iluma	Mia A. Brumfield & Kristiana Rae Colón	September 15, 2023	6BEO07	0.163
58	8	"Who Shot Ya?"	Rashaad Ernesto Green	Resheida Brady	September 22, 2023	6BEO08	0.165
Part 2
59	9	"The Aftermath"	Boma Iluma	Lena Waithe & Justin Hillian	May 10, 2024	6BEO09	0.096
60	10	"Want This Smoke"	Stacy Pascal Gaspard	Jewel Coronel	May 17, 2024	6BEO10	0.096
61	11	"Saints & Sinners"	Malakai	Racquel Baker & Mia A. Brumfield	May 24, 2024	6BEO11	0.118
62	12	"City of Gold"	Deondray Gossfield & Quincy LeNear Gossfield	Kristiana Rae Colón	May 31, 2024	6BEO12	0.132
63	13	"Legacy"	Malakai	Whitney Beckwith & Jewel Coronel	June 7, 2024	6BEO13	0.092
64	14	"Smoke & Mirrors"	Deondray Gossfield & Quincy LeNear Gossfield	Racquel Callahan	June 14, 2024	6BEO14	N/A
65	15	"Tower of Terror"	Justin Hillian	Mia A. Brumfield & Jewel Coronel	June 21, 2024	6BEO15	N/A
66	16	"Thanksgiving"	Deondray Gossfield & Quincy LeNear Gossfield	Resheida Brady	June 28, 2024	6BEO16	N/A

=== Season 7 (2025) ===
No. overall	No. in season	Title	Directed by	Written by	Original release date	Prod. code	U.S. viewers (millions)
67	1	"Black Friday"	Nancy C. Mejia	Lena Waithe & Justin Hillian	May 16, 2025	7BEO01	0.118
68	2	"The Fall Out"	Johnson Cheng	Jewel Coronel	May 23, 2025	7BEO02	0.084
69	3	"More Life"	Stacy Pascal Gaspard	Racquel Callahan	May 30, 2025	7BEO03	0.105
70	4	"Mother's Day"	Hannah Bang	Resheida Brady	June 6, 2025	7BEO04	N/A
71	5	"Safe Harbor"	Deondray Gossfield & Quincy LeNear Gossfield	Kristiana Rae Colón	June 13, 2025	7BEO05	0.121
72	6	"Do the Chi Thing"	Stacy Pascal Gaspard	James Rogers III	June 20, 2025	7BEO06	N/A
73	7	"Unfinished Business"	Boma Iluma	Mia A. Brumfield	June 27, 2025	7BEO07	N/A
74	8	"A Bet Is a Bet"	Deondray Gossfield & Quincy LeNear Gossfield	Whitney Beckwith	July 4, 2025	7BEO08	N/A
75	9	"Last Respects"	Shanrica Evans	Resheida Brady	July 11, 2025	7BEO09	0.146
76	10	"Tha Block Is Hot"	Haley Elizabeth Anderson	James Rogers III	July 18, 2025	7BEO10	0.145
77	11	"Ready or Not"	Justin Hillian	Kristiana Rae Colón & Michael Blevins	July 25, 2025	7BEO11	0.113
78	12	"Rebirth"	Deondray Gossfield & Quincy LeNear Gossfield	Jewel Coronel	August 1, 2025	7BEO12	0.150

=== Season 8 (2026) ===
No. overall	No. in season	Title	Directed by	Written by	Original release date	Prod. code	U.S. viewers (millions)
79	1	"Coldest Winter Ever"	Deondray Gossfield & Quincy LeNear Gossfield	Resheida Brady-Anderson	May 22, 2026	8BEO01	N/A
80	2	"White Russian"	Shanrica Evans	Jewel Coronel	May 29, 2026	8BEO02	N/A
81	3	"Beneath the Icy Veil"	Yolonda Ross	Mia A. Brumfield & Whitney Beckwith	June 5, 2026	8BEO03	N/A
82	4	"White Widow"	Stacy Pascal Gaspard	Michael Blevins & Andrea Branch	June 12, 2026	8BEO04	N/A
83	5	"The Dead of Winter"	Robert Townsend	Mia A. Brumfield & Christy DeGallerie	June 19, 2026	8BEO05	N/A
84	6	"When Truth Thaws"	Kelly Yu	Whitney Beckwith & Kelly Mie Ota	June 26, 2026	8BEO06	N/A
85	7	"Ice Box"	Jewel Coronel	Kristiana Rae Colón	July 3, 2026	8BEO07	N/A
86	8	"Cold Hearted"	James Rogers III	Racquel Callahan	July 10, 2026	8BEO08	N/A
87	9	"Cold Feet"	Justin Hillian	James Rogers III	July 17, 2026	8BEO09	N/A
88	10	"The Last Dance"	Deondray Gossfield & Quincy LeNear Gossfield	Lena Waithe & Justin Hillian	July 24, 2026	8BEO10	N/A

== Production ==
Official poster

On January 30, 2018, Showtime renewed the series for a second season which premiered on April 7, 2019. On April 30, 2019, Showtime renewed the series for a third season which premiered on June 21, 2020. On May 20, 2019, it was announced that Jason Mitchell would not be returning to the show for the third season because of "misconduct allegations". His character was killed off in the latter season's premiere. On September 8, 2020, Showtime renewed the series for a fourth season which premiered on May 23, 2021. In March 2021, production on the series was paused due to a positive COVID-19 test. On August 2, 2021, after the conclusion of the fourth season, it was announced that the series was renewed for a fifth season. The fifth season premiered on June 24, 2022. On August 18, 2022, the series was renewed for a sixth season before the conclusion of the fifth season. On May 8, 2024, Paramount+ with Showtime renewed the series for a seventh season that wrapped production on early October 2024. The seventh season premiered on Paramount+ for subscribers of the Paramount+ with Showtime plan on May 16, 2025, before making its air debut two days later on Showtime. On May 29, 2025, the series was renewed for an eighth season. On October 1, 2025, it was reported that the eighth season is going to be the final season. Production on the eighth season started in January 2026. The eighth and final season premiered on May 22, 2026 on Paramount+ Premium.

== Release ==
The Chi premiered on January 7, 2018, on Showtime.

=== Home media ===
20th Century Fox Television (now 20th Television) released Seasons 1 and 2 of The Chi on DVD in Region 1.

DVD name	Ep #	Release date
The Complete First Season	10	November 10, 2018
The Complete Second Season	10	December 17, 2019

== Reception ==
=== Critical response ===
On review aggregator website Rotten Tomatoes, the first season holds an approval rating of 87% based on 47 reviews, with an average rating of 7.5/10. The website's critical consensus reads, "Like an optimistic companion to The Wire, The Chi explores the complexities of life in the South Side of Chicago, with a tender touch and a clear affection for its captivating characters." On Metacritic, the season has a weighted average score of 73 out of 100 based on 22 critics, indicating "generally favorable reviews".

=== Accolades ===
Year	Award	Category	Nominee(s)	Result	Ref.
2018	Black Reel Awards	Outstanding Directing in a Drama Series	Rick Famuyiwa	Won	
2018	Black Reel Awards	Outstanding Writing in a Drama Series	Lena Waithe	Nominated	
2018	Black Reel Awards	Outstanding Supporting Actor in a Drama Series	Jacob Latimore	Nominated	
2018	Black Reel Awards	Outstanding Guest Actor in a Drama Series	Common	Nominated	
2018	Black Reel Awards	Outstanding Drama Series	Barry M. Berg, Common, Derek Dudley, Rick Famuyiwa, Aaron Kaplan, Erin Mitchell, Elwood Reid, Shelby Stone and Lena Waithe	Nominated	
2018	ReFrame Stamp	IMDbPro Top 200 Scripted TV Recipients	The Chi	Won	
2021	Gracie Allen Awards	Writer Scripted - Drama	Lena Waithe	Won	
2021	NAACP Image Awards	Outstanding Performance by a Youth (Series, Special, Television Movie or Limited Series)	Alex R. Hibbert	Nominated	
2021	ReFrame Stamp	IMDbPro Top 200 Scripted TV Recipients	The Chi	Won	
2021	Young Artist Awards	Best Performance in a TV Series - Leading Young Artist	Alex R. Hibbert	Nominated	
2022	GLAAD Media Awards	Outstanding Drama Series	The Chi	Nominated	
