= Basketball Wives LA season 3 =

Basketball Wives LA
- Season 3
- Cover used by ITunes Store. Clockwise from far left: Brittish Williams, Jackie Christie, Sundy Carter (full length), Brandi Maxiell, Draya Michele, Malaysia Pargo.
- Starring: Draya Michele; Sundy Carter; Malaysia Pargo; Brandi Maxiell; Brittish Williams; Jackie Christie
- No. of episodes: 11

Release
- Original network: VH1
- Original release: February 17 – April 28, 2014

Season chronology
- ← Previous; Season 2 Next → Season 4

The third season of the reality television series Basketball Wives LA aired on VH1 from February 17, 2014 until April 28, 2014. It follows the lives of a group of women who have all been somehow romantically linked to professional basketball players.

It was executively produced by Pam Healey, Sean Rankine, Amanda Scott, Shaunie O'Neal, Mark Seliga, and Lisa Shannon.

== Production ==
Basketball Wives LA was revealed on June 20, 2011, with Kimsha Artest, Gloria Govan, Laura Govan, Jackie Christie and Imani Showalter as the cast. Malaysia Pargo and Draya Michele were announced as part of the cast in the series' July 2011 press release. Kimsha Artest stopped showing up for filming because she did not agree with the "shenanigans and drama", which explains why she was not featured in more than one episode. Tanya Williams was to be the eighth official "wife" but left the series after two episodes. The series premiered on August 29, 2011, to 1.81 million viewers.

The third season of Basketball Wives LA was aired on February 17, 2014. Creator of the series, Shaunie O'Neal, announced that the series would be receiving a major update for the third season. Filming began in August 2013, with new members added to the mix. Gloria Govan Barnes and her sister Laura Govan confirmed their exit with their own series possibly in the works. Brooke Bailey confirmed via Twitter that she would also not return. British Williams, Brandi Maxiell, and Sundy Carter joined the cast. The third-season premiere acquired 1.95 million viewers making it the highest rated premiere for the LA franchise and a 1.0 in the adults 18–49 rating demographic. This season is also the first and only of the series to reach over 2 million viewers for six consecutive weeks

== Cast ==
=== Main ===
- Draya Michele: Girlfriend of Orlando Scandrick
- Sundy Carter: Jackie's friend
- Malaysia Pargo: Wife of Jannero Pargo
- Brandi Maxiell: Wife of Jason Maxiell
- Brittish Williams: Fiancée of Lorenzo Gordon
- Jackie Christie: Wife of Doug Christie

=== Recurring ===
- Chantel Christie: Jackie's daughter
- Lorenzo Gordon: Free Agent; Brittish's fiancee

== Episodes ==
No. overall	No. in season	Title	Original release date	U.S. viewers (millions)
31	1	"Season Premiere"	February 17, 2014	1.95
Jackie invites some ladies of the league to meet and plan an event, but as the new girls get to know each other, the claws come out, and when the focus turns to Draya, it all goes left. Sundy Carter, Brandi Maxiell and Brittish Williams are added to the opening credits replacing departing cast members Gloria Govan, Laura Govan and Brooke Bailey.
32	2	"Episode 2"	February 24, 2014	1.88
Brittish is determined to give it another shot and throws a “Turkish Tea Party” for the group. Meanwhile, Brandi's time to have another baby is running out, so she and her husband Jason seek the help of a fertility specialist.
33	3	"Episode 3"	March 3, 2014	1.90
Things are getting serious with Draya and her boyfriend Orlando Scandrick, but Jackie's daughter has news that may rock Draya's world. Meanwhile, Brittish's fiancé Lorenzo Gordon gets advice from Jackie's husband, Doug Christie.
34	4	"Episode 4"	March 10, 2014	1.66
Draya confronts her boyfriend about accusations of possible infidelity with Jackei's daughter Chantel. Jackie's gala event falls apart when almost none of her friends show up and Brittish gets into an altercation with Malaysia
35	5	"Episode 5"	March 17, 2014	1.87
With the group still reeling from the effects of Jackie's event, Sundy decides the ladies need a getaway to Palm Springs—but for the good of the group, Brittish is not invited.
36	6	"Episode 6"	March 24, 2014	2.37
The Palm Springs getaway is anything but relaxing as tensions between Draya and Sundy erupt into full-blown mayhem. And in a tearful confession, Draya tells Jackie her daughter may not be as innocent as she thinks.
37	7	"Episode 7"	March 31, 2014	2.13
Jackie develops a bottle for the cognac brand she hopes to launch. As payback for Palm Springs, Draya hosts all the ladies at an excruciating Mud Run. And Jackie forces a meeting with Draya to clear her daughter's name.
38	8	"Episode 8"	April 7, 2014	2.29
Jackie and Chantel are over the situation with Draya and her boyfriend, but Draya and Orlando aren't done yet-- they confront the ladies in an attempt to put the issue to rest. Jackie invites the group on a trip to France.
39	9	"Episode 9"	April 14, 2014	2.16
The ladies head to France to launch Jackie's cognac, but divisions in the group threaten to spoil the trip and may be the end of Jackie and Malaysia's friendship.
40	10	"Season Finale"	April 21, 2014	2.20
While in France, Jackie launches her cognac, Brittish gets a surprise present from her fiancé, Lorenzo, and Sundy's attempt to reconcile with Malaysia and Jackie takes a nasty turn that ends up splintering the entire group.
41	11	"The Reunion"	April 28, 2014	2.21
John Salley hosts the reunion. Things get heated when Sundy & Brandi show they haven't forgiven each other. Jackie reveals her final thoughts about the Orlando/Draya/Chantel love triangle. One cast member refuses to share the stage with the rest of the girls. This episode marks the final appearance of Sundy.
