= Kareem Ferguson =

American actor

- Born: Belize
- Occupations: Actor, director, producer
- Years active: 1994–present
- Website: www.kareemferguson.com

Kareem Ferguson (born in Belize), is an American actor on theater and in films and television. He has also directed one short film The Touch and produced two others, Three Takes and Talking with the Taxman About Poetry.

Ferguson is a classically trained actor receiving his Masters of Fine Arts Degree in Acting from the Professional Theater Training Program at the University of Wisconsin–Milwaukee. He has been on stage in the United States and overseas and acted in a number of television shows on NBC and CBS.

Kareem Ferguson has worked in regional theaters such as the Guthrie, Alliance, Pioneer and Penumbra Theatre companies. He is a company member of the Actors Gang Theater and Ensemble Studio Theater. He was nominated as "Best Lead Actor" for the NAACP 2011 Theater Awards for the play Free Man of Color.

Born in Belize, he now resides in Los Angeles. He is also a licensed Private Pilot and is a fanatic of aviation.

== Filmography ==
=== Director ===
- 2009: The Touch (short)

=== Producer ===
- 2009: Three Takes (short)
- 2011: Talking with the Taxman About Poetry (post-production)

=== Screenwriter ===
- 2009: The Touch (short)

=== Actor ===
- 1994: Touched by an Angel as Delivery Man in episode "The Heart of the Matter" (TV series)
- 1995: Touched by an Angel as Josh in episode "The Hero" (TV series)
- 2000: Deadline as a restaurant manager in episode "Pilot" (TV series)
- 2002: Nobody's Perfect as ER (credited as Karim Ra)
- 2002: One Night as Babawale
- 2004: Scrubs as a waiter in episode "My best Moment" (TV series)
- 2005: Twilight's Last Gleaming as Mud's father (short)
- 2005: Las Vegas as Carl in episode "To Protect and Serve Manicotti" (TV series)
- 2007: The DL Chronicles as Austin in the 2nd episode "Robert" (TV series)
- 2009: The Touch as Trace (short)
- 2009: Three Takes as Keith (short)
- 2009: The Panty Man as The Panty Man (short)
- 2009: Something Blue as a male stripper
- 2010: Plateaus as Wes (short)
- 2011: Talking with the Taxman About Poetry as Theodore (post-production)
