= Garett Nolan =

American actor, model and social media personality

- Born: December 11, 1997 (age 27); Williamsport, Pennsylvania, U.S.
- Occupation: Social media personality
- Years active: 2020 – present

TikTok information
- Page: garett__nolan
- Followers: 15.4 million
- Last updated: May 11, 2025

Garett Nolan (born December 11, 1997) is an American actor, model, and social media personality, best known for his content on TikTok.

== Biography ==
Garett Nolan was born in Williamsport, Pennsylvania, in 1997, and was raised in South Williamsport, Pennsylvania. He graduated from South Williamsport High School in 2016.

In 2012, Nolan joined USA Cycling in competitive mountain biking, and participated in their Cross-Country Mountain Bike National Championships in 2013. Nolan would become a three-time National Cross Country competitor and was ranked in the top five nationally.

Nolan is best known as a personality on the social media platform TikTok. Nolan became one of the platform's first verified profiles in the United States after having joined the platform in November 2019. Nolan's TikTok account had 11.7 million as of March 2021. Within TikTok, his profile was ranked at number 9210 in the United States as of March 2021. Nolan's humorous TikTok post featuring him singing while holding his "disapproving" cat, Ivan, was featured by PopSugar in August 2020.

Nolan joined the United States Marines Corps in 2018 and as of 2020 was an active United States Marine Corps Reservist. He is managed by White Cross Management, a California-based model management group owned by photographer and talent scout Jim Jordan.

== Controversy ==
In September 2020, Nolan was involved in a controversy that called into question some active US military service members' use of online social platforms.

After an August 2020 video surfaced of two female service members dancing provocatively to the song "WAP" by rapper Cardi B, Nolan, another TikTok user named John Bland, and others were called into question for posting seductive "thirst trapping" videos in uniform or partial uniform. Critics raised concerns that the use of military uniform in said videos was inappropriate or even exploitative of the uniform. The use of TikTok by American service members caused particular concern due to a late 2019 ban of the app by the Pentagon, Army and Navy due to the platform's Chinese origins. However, a report from at least one high-ranking officer claims that the regulations are actually vague in this case, specifically as relating to the non-work related activities of service members in non-leadership roles. Therefore, according to this report, it is unclear as to whether or not Nolan's and others' videos actually violated policy.

== Discography ==
=== Singles ===
==== As lead artist ====
- 2021: Black Sheep (with English)
- 2021: Adieu Addie
- 2022: HER.
