= Isaac Keys =

American gridiron football player and actor (born 1978)

Profile
- Position: Linebacker

Personal information
- Born: June 6, 1978 (age 48); St. Louis, Missouri, U.S.

Career information
- College: Morehouse

Career history
- 2001: Minnesota Vikings
- 2003: Green Bay Packers*
- 2003: Scottish Claymores
- 2004–2006: Arizona Cardinals
- 2007: Edmonton Eskimos
- * Offseason or practice squad member only
- Stats at Pro Football Reference

Isaac Keys (born June 6, 1978) is an American actor and former professional football player. He served as a National Football League (NFL) linebacker for the Minnesota Vikings, Arizona Cardinals, and Green Bay Packers. In 2007, he played for the Edmonton Eskimos in the Canadian Football League (CFL).

== Early life ==
Keys attended Hazelwood Central High School in St. Louis, Missouri, and won varsity letters in football and baseball. He is an alumnus of Morehouse College in Atlanta, Georgia.

== Post-football career ==
In 2010, Keys appeared as one of the 12 contestants on the TV One reality television dating game show The Ultimate Merger, which starred former Apprentice contestant Omarosa.

He returned to his hometown of St. Louis in 2011 to star in the hit stage play Issues of Love, written and directed by Joel P.E. King, where he played the character Tye, who had compassion for his sister Bridgette, was preyed on by a married woman and was disliked by her husband.

In 2015, Keys played a security guard in the film Jurassic World

From 2017 to 2019, Keys had a recurring role as Ed, a gang enforcer, on the TV series Get Shorty.

In 2022, Keys debuted the character Diamond in the Starz show and Power spin-off Power Book IV: Force.
