= The DL Chronicles =

- Genre: Gay Drama
- Created by: Quincy LeNear; Deondray Gossett
- Directed by: Quincy LeNear; Deondray Gossett
- Country of origin: United States
- Original language: English
- No. of seasons: 1
- No. of episodes: 4 ("Wes", "Robert", "Boo", "Mark")

Production
- Executive producers: Deondray Gossett; Quincy LeNear; Ahmed Best
- Running time: 30 minutes

Original release
- Network: here!
- Release: 2007 – 2007

The DL Chronicles is a gay-themed television series that debuted on American LGBT station here! in 2007 for one season that consisted of four episodes. It was revived in 2012 as "The DL Chronicles Returns".

== Overview ==
The show's debut season focused on the stories of men who live secret lives. From a highly successful executive to the street corner hustler, from the happily married father of two, to the college athlete's first love, each episode, featuring a different cast, delved into the different lives and experiences of men living on the "down low".

Each episode features narration from Chadwick Williams (Damian Toofeek Raven), an aspiring journalist, as he pursues research while authoring a book about men who have sex with men (MSM). The series was created by filmmakers Quincy LeNear and Deondray Gossett who also serve as the producers and directors of the series.

The series has won numerous awards, including the GLAAD Media Award for Best Anthology Series in 2008. It has the added distinction of being both the first African American themed show and the first show produced by a cable network to win the award.

== Episodes ==
=== Episode 1: Wes ===
Wes Thomas (Darren Schnase), an upwardly mobile real-estate banker, soon finds himself overwhelmed by the demands of his marriage, career, and closeted attraction to men. When Wes' sexy but ambivalent brother-in-law Trent Porter (Ty Vincent) stops in for an unexpected stay, he is faced with temptation and ultimately falls for the forbidden fruit.

Cast
- Damian Toofeek Raven as Chadwick Williams
- Darren Dupree Washington as Wes Thomas (credited as Darren Schnase)
- Jessica Beshir as Sarah Thomas
- Ty Vincent as Trent Porter
- Maya Gilbert as Patricia Buford
- R.J. Black as Charles Buford II
- Holly Karrol Clark as Tanya Dubois
- Phil Selvey as Rodney Dubois

=== Episode 2: Robert ===
Robert, a closeted talent agent (Terrell Tilford) falls for a much younger health food store manager named Austin (Kareem Ferguson). What Robert fails to share is that he has a daughter, Rhonda Hall (Toyin Moses) who doesn't know that her father is gay. While on a daddy/daughter date they run into Austin who pretends to be Robert's client. Rhonda is no fool. She goes to the health store and confronts Austin. He tells her the truth about the nature of their relationship. Robert blames Austin for outing him. Their relationship ends after Robert slings homophobic slurs at Austin. Robert and his daughter sit down for a long overdue discussion and eventually he receives his daughter's understanding. He realizes that ending his relationship with Austin was a huge mistake. With honest and touching words, he wins Austin back.

Cast
- Damian Toofeek Raven as Chadwick Williams
- Terrell Tilford as Robert Hall
- Kareem Ferguson as Austin
- Toyin Moses as Rhonda Hall
- Sheilynn Wactor as Shirley
- Jason Stuart as Sassy Customer
- Karamo Brown as Agent #1
- Paul Jerome as Agent #2 (credited as Paul Eric Jerome)
- Ty Vincent as Trent Porter (in a photo)

=== Episode 3: Boo ===
Boo (Oneil Cespedes) is an ex-convict, a mooch, and a player who lives his life on the DL. His girlfriend Kesha (Latoya Haynes) is fed up with Boo's cheating and kicks him to the curb. Boo's mother (Irene Amen) tells him it's time to settle down, but Boo is unfazed and continues having sex with multiple partners, including an unprotected romp with Deron (Anthony Clark), his neighborhood friend. But when shocking news rattles Boo, he is forced to reconsider his reckless life on the DL.

Cast
- Damian Toofeek Raven as Chadwick Williams
- Oneil Cespedes as Boo
- Latoya Haynes as Keisha
- Anthony Clark as Deron
- Irene Amen as Mama
- Sheilynn Wactor as Shirley
- Clifton Morris as Tony
- T. Ashanti Mozelle as Jesse
- Brandon McKinnie as Kyle
- Cherie Price as Nikka
- Shawn Palm as Naked Man
- Sydelle Noel as Other Woman (credited as Sydelle Granger)

=== Episode 4: Mark ===
Mark (Ulrich Que) and Donte (Colbert Alembert), a loving couple who have been living on the DL, are jolted by the unexpected arrival of Mark’s thuggish cousin, Terrell (Ace Gibson), who shows up at their house needing a place to crash. Desperate to keep their relationship a secret, Mark asks his boyfriend to pretend he's straight. When Dante reluctantly agrees to play the part of Mark's "roommate" for their new houseguest, a chain of humorous events unfolds, and Mark eventually comes to realize the ridiculous nature of living on the DL in their own home.

Cast
- Damian Toofeek Raven as Chadwick Williams
- Ulrich Que as Mark Watts
- Colbert Alembert as Donte
- Ace Gibson as Terrell Wiggins (credited as Dee Gibson)
- Monte Franks as Reginald Stokes
- Craig Davidson as Bartender
- Tamiko K. Brooks as Nosey Neighbor
- Chuanda Mason as Pretty woman in bar
- T. Ashanti Mozelle as Jesse

== 2012 Revival (The DL Chronicles Returns) ==
=== Episode 5: Thomas ===
Thomas, a former New York City firefighter, falls in love with a stranger who unexpectedly comes into his life to assist him after facing a tragic event.

Cast
- Damian Toofeek Raven as Chadwick Williams
- Gabriel Corbin as Thomas Gavin
- Colbert Alembert as Dante
- Johanny Paulino as Steven Nevins
- DeLaRosa Rivera as Columbus
