= Miriam A. Hyman =

American actress

- Born: Lancaster, Pennsylvania
- Occupation: Actress
- Years active: 2005–present

Miriam A. Hyman is an American actress. She is best known for playing Dre in the drama series The Chi and USA Stacy Marks in the crime drama series Power Book IV: Force.

== Early life ==
Hyman was born in Lancaster, Pennsylvania and raised in Philadelphia. She went on to graduate from the Yale School of Drama and is a recipient of the prestigious Princess Grace Award and Leonore Annenberg Fellowship for Performing Arts.

== Career ==
Hyman's first recurring role came playing ME Emile Cooper in the crime series Blue Bloods. She has also been featured in shows such as Grey’s Anatomy, The Rookie, Orange Is The New Black, SMILF, NCIS: Naval Criminal Investigative Service, Unbreakable Kimmy Schmidt and Master of None. Her biggest role so far has been playing Dre in the drama series The Chi. She also had a starring role as US Stacy Marks in the crime drama series Power Book IV: Force.

== Personal life ==
Hyman performs as a hip hop artist under the moniker Robyn Hood. She is an outspoken advocate for Black Lives Matter.

== Filmography ==
=== Film ===
Year	Title	Role	Notes
2005	Inclinations	Eve	Short
2005	Angel Rodriguez	Chantel	
2010	Bereavement	Waitress	
2016	Split	Ninshubur	
2016	The Congressman	Abigail Ross	
2017	Most Beautiful Island	Bikie	
2019	Brittany Runs a Marathon	Snobby Artist Woman	
2019	The Sun Is Also a Star	Patricia Kingsley	
2019	Blackberry	Renee	Short
2024	The Lost Holliday	Katia Del Gado	

=== Television ===
Year	Title	Role	Notes
2005	Law & Order	Savannah Watson	Episode: "Birthright"
2006	Conviction	Mavis Connery	Episode: "The Wall"
2008	The Wire	Social Worker	Episode: "Transitions"
2012	30 Rock	Woman in Elevator	Episode: "Aunt Phatso vs. Jack Donaghy"
2013	Hostages	Nancy	Episode: "Hail Mary"
2015	The Blacklist	Reporter #1	Episode: "Luther Braxton (No. 21): Conclusion"
2016	Unforgettable	Haley	Episode: "Paranoid Android"
2016	Falling Water	Woman in Scrubs	Episode: "Don't Tell Bill"
2016	Red Oaks	Janice	Episode: "The Bris"
2017	Master of None	Madeleine's friend	Episode: "First Date"
2017	Unbreakable Kimmy Schmidt	Pastor Denise	Episode: "Kimmy Goes to Church"
2017	Odd Mom Out	Pam Tinkler	Episode: "Jury Doody"
2015-2017	Blue Bloods	Emile Cooper	7 episodes
2017	SMILF	Romero	Episode: "Chocolate Pudding & a Cooler of Gatorade"
2018	Orange Is the New Black	Parenting Class Mom	Episode: "State of the Uterus"
2018	Grey's Anatomy	Michelle Williams	Episode: "Flowers Grow Out Of My Grave"
2018	NCIS	Lanny Peete	Episode: "Tailing Angie"
2019	The Rookie	Broke Tenant	Episode: "Redwood"
2019	Blindspot	Colonel Anne Hecker	Episode: "Though This Be Madness, Yet There Is Method In't"
2019	High Maintenance	Lauryn	Episode: "Payday"
2019	The OA	Tess	Episode: "Angel of Death"
2020	Steven Universe Future	Bismuth (voice)	3 episodes
2020-2023	The Chi	Dre	32 episodes
2022-2025	Power Book IV: Force	USA Stacy Marks	16 episodes

=== Video games ===
Year	Title	Role	Notes
2016	The Walking Dead: Michonne	Donna	
2019	Steven Universe: Unleash the Light	Bismuth	
2022	Horizon Forbidden West	Harriem, Marsa	
