= Michael V. Epps =

American actor

- Born: September 29, 2005 (age 21); Virginia
- Occupation: Actor
- Years active: 2018–present

Michael V. Epps is an American actor. He is best known for playing Jake Taylor in the drama series The Chi.

== Early life ==
Epps was born in Virginia to Keisha Johnson who is also his manager. He is a former student at Forest Park Middle School.

== Career ==
His biggest role so far has been playing Jake Taylor in the drama series The Chi. He has said he is similar to his character in many ways such as being laid back. Being one of the youngest cast members he has learned much from his older cast mates such as how to perfect his technique. He is also a musician and performs under the name MIKEY. Epps also enjoys giving back by participating in local turkey drives and giveaways for the homeless. He is the ambassador for the P.O.P on Youth Violence foundation.

== Personal life ==
Outside of acting Epps owns his own clothing company called Crown Me. He is currently writing a book with his mother about her life and the process of turning her son into a star.

== Filmography ==
=== Film ===
Year	Title	Role	Notes
2023	Primary Position	Jarren	

=== Television ===
Year	Title	Role	Notes
2018	Chicago Fire	Taye	Episode; When They See Us Coming
2023	Chicago Med	Aaron Curtis	Episode; It Is What It Is, Until It Isn't
2018–2026	The Chi	Jake Taylor	85 episodes
