= Federal Correctional Institution, Mendota =

Medium-security prison in California, US

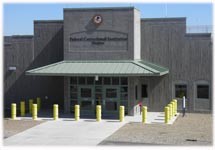
- Interactive map of Federal Correctional Institution, Mendota
- Location: Fresno County, near Mendota, California; 36°44′00″N 120°23′32″W
- Status: Operational
- Security class: Medium-security (with minimum-security prison camp)
- Capacity: 1,600 (128 in camp)
- Population: 1,312 (103 in camp)
- Opened: 2012
- Managed by: Federal Bureau of Prisons
- Warden: Maria Arviza
- Website: http://www.bop.gov/locations/institutions/men/

The Federal Correctional Institution, Mendota (FCI Mendota) is a medium-security United States federal prison for male inmates in California. It is operated by the Federal Bureau of Prisons, a division of the United States Department of Justice. The facility also has an adjacent satellite prison camp housing minimum-security male offenders.

FCI Mendota is located in central California, 36 miles west of Fresno.

== History ==
FCI Mendota opened in January 2012 after years of funding delays. The final cost of construction was $235 million. Mendota Mayor Robert Silva was pleased about the new jobs and revenue for local businesses that the prison would provide and encouraged the Bureau of Prisons to hire as many local residents as it could.

== Facility and inmate life ==
FCI Mendota is located on 960 acres and is enclosed with a 12-foot-high razor wire fence. Inside the facility, inmates have access to educational programs where they may work toward their GED certificate and gain vocational training. Prisoners are required to work on a number of duties, ranging from food preparation in the dining hall to maintenance work. A recreation yard has basketball courts, a soccer field and a track.

Inmates sleep in seven- by twelve-foot cells, complete with toilet and sink. They have access to a common area where they can exercise, shower, and watch basic cable television.

Official counts are conducted at 12:05 a.m., 3 a.m., 5 a.m., 4 p.m. and 10 p.m. The 4 p.m. and 10 p.m. counts are known as "standing counts," during which inmates must stop what they are doing and stand up even if they are in bed. An additional standing count is held at 10 a.m. on holidays and weekends.

== Notable inmates ==
Inmate Name	Register Number	Photo	Status	Details
Frankie Maybee	10463-010		Served an 11-year sentence; released November 3, 2020, from a Residential Reentry Facility in Dallas, TX	Convicted for his role in a 2010 incident during which a group of Hispanic men were threatened and run off the road; accomplice Sean Popejoy was sentenced to 4 years; the first individuals sentenced under the 2009 Hate Crimes Prevention Act.
Jeffrey Bizzack	01694-138		Served a 2-month sentence; released from custody on February 28, 2020.	Convicted for his role in the 2019 college admissions bribery scandal.
Richard Scutari	34840-080		Served a 60 year sentence, released in January 2025	Former member of the white supremacist group The Order. Convicted in 1987 of conspiracy, racketeering, and robbery. Sentenced to 60 years in prison.
Jeremy Meeks	71672-097		Served sentence of over 2 years; released on July 7, 2016.	Jeremy Meeks was dubbed the "hot felon" by some media.
James Kopp	11761-055		Serving a life sentence.	Associate of the anti-abortion group The Lambs of Christ; convicted in 2007 of the 1998 murder of Dr. Barnett Slepian, who performed abortions at a clinic in Buffalo, New York; Kopp was one of the FBI Ten Most Wanted Fugitives prior to his capture in 2001.
Luis Hernando Gómez	04173-748		Serving a 25-year sentence; scheduled for release 2032.	Colombian Drug Lord; known as "Rasguño", member of the Norte Del Valle Cartel. On October 18, 2008, Gomez pleaded guilty to racketeering charges in a Washington court. He also admitted sending over 500,000 kilograms of cocaine to America through Mexico between 1990 and 2004 as well as conspiracy to make and distribute more than 10,000 kilograms of cocaine destined for the US.

== See also ==
- List of U.S. federal prisons
- Federal Bureau of Prisons
- Incarceration in the United States
