= Power Book IV: Force =

2022 American crime drama television series

- Genre: Crime drama
- Created by: Robert Munic
- Based on: Power created by Courtney A. Kemp
- Starring: Joseph Sikora; Lucien Cambric; Anthony Fleming III; Shane Harper; Isaac Keys; Kris D. Lofton; Gabrielle Ryan; Lili Simmons; Tommy Flanagan; Miriam A. Hyman; Manuel Eduardo Ramirez; Adrienne Walker; Carmela Zumbado; Michael Rainey Jr.
- Opening theme: "Power Powder Respect" by 50 Cent and Jeremih
- Composer: Mark Batson
- Country of origin: United States
- Original language: English
- No. of seasons: 3
- No. of episodes: 30

Production
- Executive producers: Larysa Kondracki; Brett Mahoney; Danielle De Jesus; Chris Selak; Mark Canton; Bart Wenrich; Shana Stein; Robert Munic; Curtis "50 Cent" Jackson; Courtney A. Kemp
- Editor: John Coniglio
- Camera setup: Single-camera setup
- Running time: 48–57 minutes
- Production companies: Pull The Pin Productions, Inc.; End of Episode, Inc.; G-Unit Film & Television Inc.; Atmosphere Television; CBS Studios; Lionsgate Television

Original release
- Network: Starz
- Release: February 6, 2022 – January 16, 2026

Related
- Power Universe

Power Book IV: Force, or simply Force is an American crime drama television series created by Robert Munic that premiered on February 6, 2022, on Starz. The series is a sequel and third spin-off to Power created by Courtney A. Kemp. In March 2022, the series was renewed for a second season, which premiered on September 1, 2023. In December 2023, the series was renewed for a third season. In June 2024, it was announced that the third season will be the final season. The third and final season premiered on November 7, 2025.

== Cast ==
=== Main ===
- Joseph Sikora as Tommy Egan
- Isaac Keys as David "Diamond" Sampson
- Lili Simmons as Claudia "Claud" Flynn
- Gabrielle Ryan as Gloria (season 1)
- Shane Harper as Victor "Vic" Flynn
- Kris D. Lofton as Jenard Sampson
- Anthony Fleming as JP Gibbs
- Lucien Cambric as Darnell "D-Mac" McDowell
- Tommy Flanagan as Walter Flynn (seasons 1–2)
- Miriam A. Hyman as Stacy Marks (seasons 2–3; guest season 1)
- Adrienne Walker as Shanti 'Showstopper' Page (seasons 2–3)
- Carmela Zumbado as Mireya Garcia (seasons 2–3)
- Manuel Eduardo Ramirez as Miguel Garcia (seasons 2–3)
- Michael Rainey Jr. as Tariq St. Patrick (season 3)

=== Supporting ===
- Audrey Esparza as Liliana (season 1; guest season 2) (voice)
- Jeremih as Elijah (season 1)
- Chanell Bell as Lauryn Williams (seasons 1–2)
- Konstantin Lavysh as Rodovan Mirkovic
- Guy Van Swearingen as Paulie "Pierogi" Muzaski (seasons 1–2)
- Ahmad Nicholas Ferguson as Marshall Cranon
- Phil Donlon as Simon McDougal (season 1)
- Debo Balogun as Seamus Bennigan (seasons 1–2)
- Barton Fitzpatrick as Blaxton (season 1)
- Mirelly Taylor as Mrs. Soto (season 1)
- Paulina Nguyen as Mai Liet (season 1)
- Blythe Howard as Adrienne (season 1)
- Freddie Gibbs as Cousin Buddy (season 1)
- Patricia Kalember as Kate Egan
- Monique Gabriela Curnen as Detective Blanca Rodriguez (season 1)
- Alain Uy as Bill Tseng (seasons 2–3)
- Chris Tardio as Bobby DiFranco (seasons 2–3)
- Corey DeMon as Bones (seasons 2–3)
- Edward Williams III as Raheem (seasons 2–3)
- Kevin Tre'von Patterson as Big Smurf (seasons 2–3)
- Kay Eye as Greyskull (seasons 2–3)
- Angel Rosario Jr. as Rafael Nuñez (season 2)
- Max Arciniega as Naci (season 2)
- Keen E. Head as Tyrone Reeves (season 2)
- Sammy A. Publes as El Che (seasons 2–3)
- Kellye Howard as Kendra Briggs (seasons 2–3)
- Taylor Brightman as Genesis Delaney (seasons 2–3)
- Glen Davis as King Kilo (seasons 2–3)
- Eric Avilés as Chavo Cardenas (seasons 2–3)
- Danny Villegas as Izzy (seasons 2–3)
- Steve Casillas as Roberto Ortega (seasons 2–3)
- Alex Livinalli as Cruz (season 3)
- James Adam Lim as Tichen Chan (season 3)
- Nickola Shreli as Peter Hoxba (season 3)

== Episodes ==
=== Series overview ===
Season	Episodes	Originally released	
Season	Episodes	First released	Last released
1	10	February 6, 2022	April 17, 2022
2	10	September 1, 2023	November 10, 2023
3	10	November 7, 2025	January 16, 2026

=== Season 1 (2022) ===
No. overall	No. in season	Title	Directed by	Written by	Original release date	U.S. viewers (millions)
1	1	"A Short Fuse and a Long Memory"	Larysa Kondracki	Robert Munic	February 6, 2022	0.648
2	2	"King of the Goddamn Hill"	Kieron Hawkes	Robert Munic	February 13, 2022	0.311
3	3	"Firestarter"	Shana Stein	Kendra Chanae Chapman	February 20, 2022	0.431
4	4	"Storm Clouds"	Kieron Hawkes	Allison Intrieri	February 27, 2022	0.404
5	5	"Take Me Home"	Eif Rivera	Robert Munic	March 6, 2022	0.572
6	6	"This Is Who We Are"	Kieron Hawkes	Sylvia L. Jones	March 13, 2022	0.477
7	7	"Outrunning a Ghost"	Bart Wenrich	Kirkland Morris	March 20, 2022	0.451
8	8	"He Ain't Heavy"	Rob Hardy	Michael Cobian	March 27, 2022	0.399
9	9	"Trust"	Carl Seaton	Elle Triedman	April 10, 2022	0.465
10	10	"Family Business"	Deon Taylor	Vladimir Cvetko	April 17, 2022	0.505

=== Season 2 (2023) ===
No. overall	No. in season	Title	Directed by	Written by	Original release date	U.S. viewers (millions)
11	1	"Tommy's Back"	Rob Hardy	Gary Lennon	September 1, 2023	0.198
12	2	"Great Consequence"	Carl Seaton	Kendra Chanae Chapman	September 8, 2023	0.201
13	3	"War & Ice Cream"	Cierra 'Shooter' Glaudé	Terri Kopp	September 15, 2023	0.254
14	4	"The Devil's in the Details"	Kieron Hawkes	Nikki McCauley	September 22, 2023	0.240
15	5	"Crown Vic"	Lisa Demaine	Sammy Horowitz & Adam Pasen	September 29, 2023	0.304
16	6	"Here There Be Monsters"	Robert Townsend	La Monte Edwards	October 6, 2023	0.207
17	7	"Chicago Is Heating Up!"	Sharon Lewis	Anthony Florez	October 13, 2023	0.281
18	8	"Dead Reckoning"	Eif Rivera	Melody Cooper	October 20, 2023	0.274
19	9	"No Loose Ends"	Lisa Demaine	Terri Kopp & James Slainmann	November 3, 2023	0.304
20	10	"Power Powder Respect"	Deon Taylor	Gary Lennon & Amelia Swedeen	November 10, 2023	0.307

=== Season 3 (2025–26) ===
No. overall	No. in season	Title	Directed by	Written by	Original release date	U.S. viewers (millions)
21	1	"Do or Die"	Lisa Demaine	Gary Lennon	November 7, 2025	N/A
22	2	"A Seat at the Table"	Anthony Hemingway	Kendra Chanae Chapman	November 14, 2025	N/A
23	3	"There's Always a Price to Pay"	Cierra 'Shooter' Glaudé	Anthony Florez	November 21, 2025	N/A
24	4	"Time to See the King"	Kieron Hawkes	Nikki McCauley	November 28, 2025	N/A
25	5	"The Last Dance"	Robert Townsend	Terri Kopp	December 5, 2025	N/A
26	6	"Asset Forfeiture"	Lisa Demaine	Sammy Horowitz & Adam Pasen	December 12, 2025	N/A
27	7	"Lines in the Sand"	Gary Lennon	La Monte Edwards	December 19, 2025	N/A
28	8	"Build Back Better"	Monica Raymund	Amelia Swedeen	December 26, 2025	N/A
29	9	"War Requiem"	Eif Rivera	Terri Kopp & James Slainmann	January 2, 2026	N/A
30	10	"Beginning of the End"	Robert Townsend	Gary Lennon & Sarah Gambles	January 16, 2026	N/A

== Production ==
In August 2020, it was announced that the series had been given a greenlight with a 10-episode series order focusing on Joseph Sikora's character of Tommy Egan. At that time, Robert Munic would serve as showrunner and executive producer alongside Courtney A. Kemp and Curtis "50 Cent" Jackson. In February 2021, eight additional cast members were added as series regulars: Lili Simmons, Gabrielle Ryan, Isaac Keys, Shane Harper, Kris D. Lofton, Anthony Fleming III, Lucien Cambric and Tommy Flanagan. In May 2021, it was announced that Jeremih would be joining the cast in a recurring role. In July 2021, it was announced that creator Robert Munic would leave as showrunner, citing creative differences; Courtney A. Kemp, who oversees all Power series, would replace him. On March 9, 2022, Starz renewed the series for a second season with Gary Lennon joining as showrunner. On December 15, 2023, Starz renewed the series for a third season. On June 13, 2024, it was announced that the third season was going to be the final season.

== Broadcast ==
Power Book IV: Force premiered on February 6, 2022, on Starz. The second season premiered on September 1, 2023. The third and final season premiered on November 7, 2025.

== Reception ==
On Rotten Tomatoes, the first season has an approval rating of 100% with an average score of 7/10 based on 5 reviews.
