= Jim Jordan (photographer) =

American fashion photographer

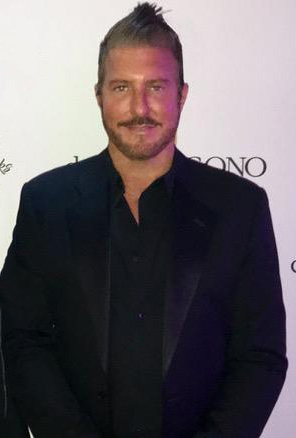
- Jordan posing for the cover of GQ Magazine
- Known for: Fashion photographer Commercial photographer Talent manager Entrepreneur
- Website: jimjordanphotography.com

Jim Jordan is an American fashion and commercial photographer, entrepreneur, talent scout, manager, and magazine publisher.

Initially working as a hair and makeup artist and modeling talent scout, Jordan's self-taught style of photography gained the attention of the owner of fashion retailer J.Crew, which led to him becoming a fashion and commercial photographer/director. Jordan's photography has been featured on the covers of magazines such as Vogue, Vanity Fair, Elle, and Marie Claire, and others. Jordan has photographed and worked with celebrities such as Kris Jenner, Leonardo DiCaprio, Charlize Theron, Mila Kunis, and Drew Barrymore.

As an entrepreneur, Jordan is the proprietor of three businesses: Jim Jordan Photography, which handles Jordan's fashion and commercial photography; White Cross Productions, a production group that directs films and produces ad campaigns and commercials for clients such as Mercedes-Benz, American Express, Warner Bros.; and White Cross Management, a talent management agency that has discovered and represents numerous celebrities and models, most notably Jeremy Meeks, Taylor Hill, and Gigi Hadid.

== Biography ==
Jordan grew up in Southern California. At the age of 15, Jordan dropped out of school and began working as a talent scout for modeling agencies. Jordan would find high school girls that were 5'10"-5'11" (178-180 cm), do their hair and makeup, and take them to his friend Greg Glassman (later the founder of CrossFit) to photograph. Jordan would then submit Glassman's photography to companies such as Elite Model Management, who placed many of Jordan's models in haute couture photo shoots. At one point, Glassman gave Jordan a camera so that Jordan could start taking the photos of the potential models himself.

Elite Model Management recommended that Jordan fly to Italy and submit a portfolio of his hair and makeup work to the women's magazine Grazia. After Jordan arrived, Grazia hired Jordan as a replacement hair and makeup artist when a crew member failed to arrive at a scheduled photo shoot. This initial opportunity opened up more opportunities for Jordan to work on photo shoots with other magazines. Jordan began traveling as a celebrity hair and makeup artist, working with celebrities such as Cindy Crawford, Elizabeth Taylor, Sophia Loren, and Farrah Fawcett, and working underneath photographers such as Herb Ritts, Douglas Kirkland, Peter Lindbergh, and Patrick Demarchelier.

While Jordan worked as a hair and makeup artist, he would get to know the models and celebrities being photographed, and would build a rapport with them. He would then photograph the subjects during lunch breaks and off hours, encouraging them to deliver more intimate and personal portrayals for his photography. Jordan stored the resulting photography in a large black box, with no intention of showing his work to anyone.

Jordan worked 12 years as a hair and makeup artist before working as a professional photographer. Circa 1993, he was booked to do hair and makeup for a photo shoot with J.Crew, and ended up working with the company's owner Emily Woods. Woods requested to see Jordan's photography due to the recommendations of several models Jordan had worked with previously. Upon examining Jordan's work, Woods booked Jordan as a photographer for a two-week shoot in Hawaii, launching Jordan's career as a professional photographer. He has shot images of celebrities such as Kris Jenner, Leonardo DiCaprio, Drew Barrymore, Charlize Theron, and Mila Kunis, and works for clients such as Vogue, Vanity Fair, Elle, and Marie Claire.

Jordan appeared in four episodes Season One of the Lifetime Network reality TV series Making a Model With Yolanda Hadid (2018). He was featured most prominently in the episode "Learning the Ropes," which aired January 25, 2018. Jordan is currently working on his autobiography.

== Photographic style ==
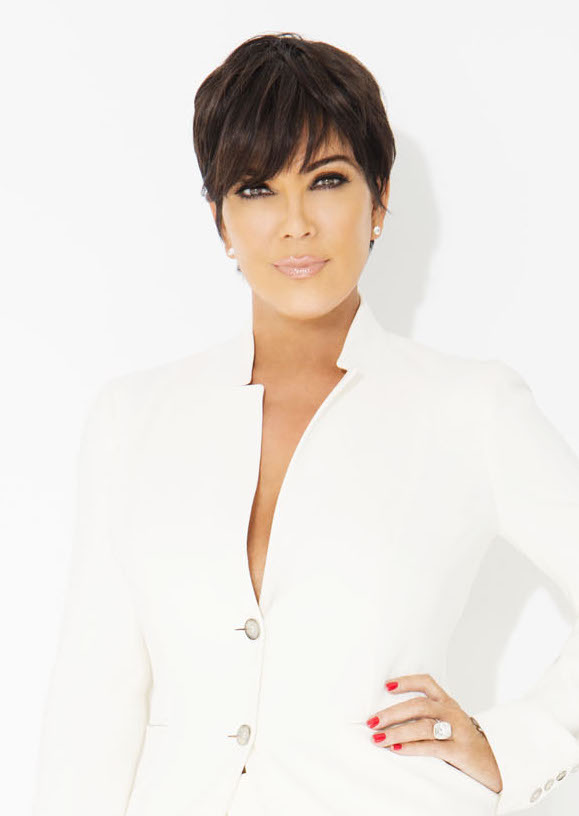
Kris Jenner shot by Jordan at White Cross Studios

Jim Jordan describes his style as "energetic, bright, warm and light." His style has also been described as having a "crisp edge and a brilliant energy." Jordan's frequent use of bright lighting is influenced by natural lighting from the sun. Jordan's style is primarily self-taught, and was achieved through trial and error and through observing other photographers work. Jordan credits Bruce Weber and Arthur Elgort as major influences on his work.

Jordan's photography also features a "human element" that derives from his practice of getting to know this subjects and building a rapport with them before photographing them. Jordan is able to tailor his approach to a wide range of subjects to bring out an honesty and authenticity not often seen in commercial photography.

== As talent scout ==
In 2011, Jordan discovered supermodel and actress Taylor Hill while on location for a photo shoot at a ranch in Granby, Colorado where Hill and her family rode horses. Jordan photographed Hill and subsequently shopped the images, securing her contracts with a number of modeling agencies.

Jordan was also instrumental in the discovery, development, and placement of model Gigi Hadid.

After "Hot Felon" Jeremy Meeks' mugshot went viral in 2014, Jordan's White Cross Management took an interest in signing Meeks to a management contract while the latter was still in prison. Jordan then signed Meeks to a contract with White Cross Management in March 2015. Jordan began working with Meeks upon the latter's release from the transitional housing facility which he was ordered to stay in after his March 2016 release from prison. White Cross Management continues to manage Meeks, and featured Meeks on the cover of their online magazines James Magazine USA Vol. VII and White Cross Magazine Vol. 01.

In November 2020, Jordan discovered social media personality Garett Nolan, and White Cross Management took Nolan on as a client soon thereafter.

== As entrepreneur (White Cross Productions and White Cross Management) ==
Jim Jordan is the proprietor of several independent businesses. Jordan's photography business, Jim Jordan Photography, employs seven full-time employees in Los Angeles and four in New York. In 2003, Jordan launched White Cross Productions, a full service production and management company. The company has produced ad campaigns and commercials for clients such as Mercedes-Benz, American Express, Warner Bros., etc.

White Cross Management, Jordan's talent management agency, launched in the early 2000s. As of 2015, the agency represents fifty models, as well as musicians, actors, and other creatives in the entertainment industry.

Jordan is founder of the fashion and lifestyle publications James Magazine USA, Major Magazine USA, and White Cross Magazine.
