= Deondray Gossfield =

American director, producer, and writer

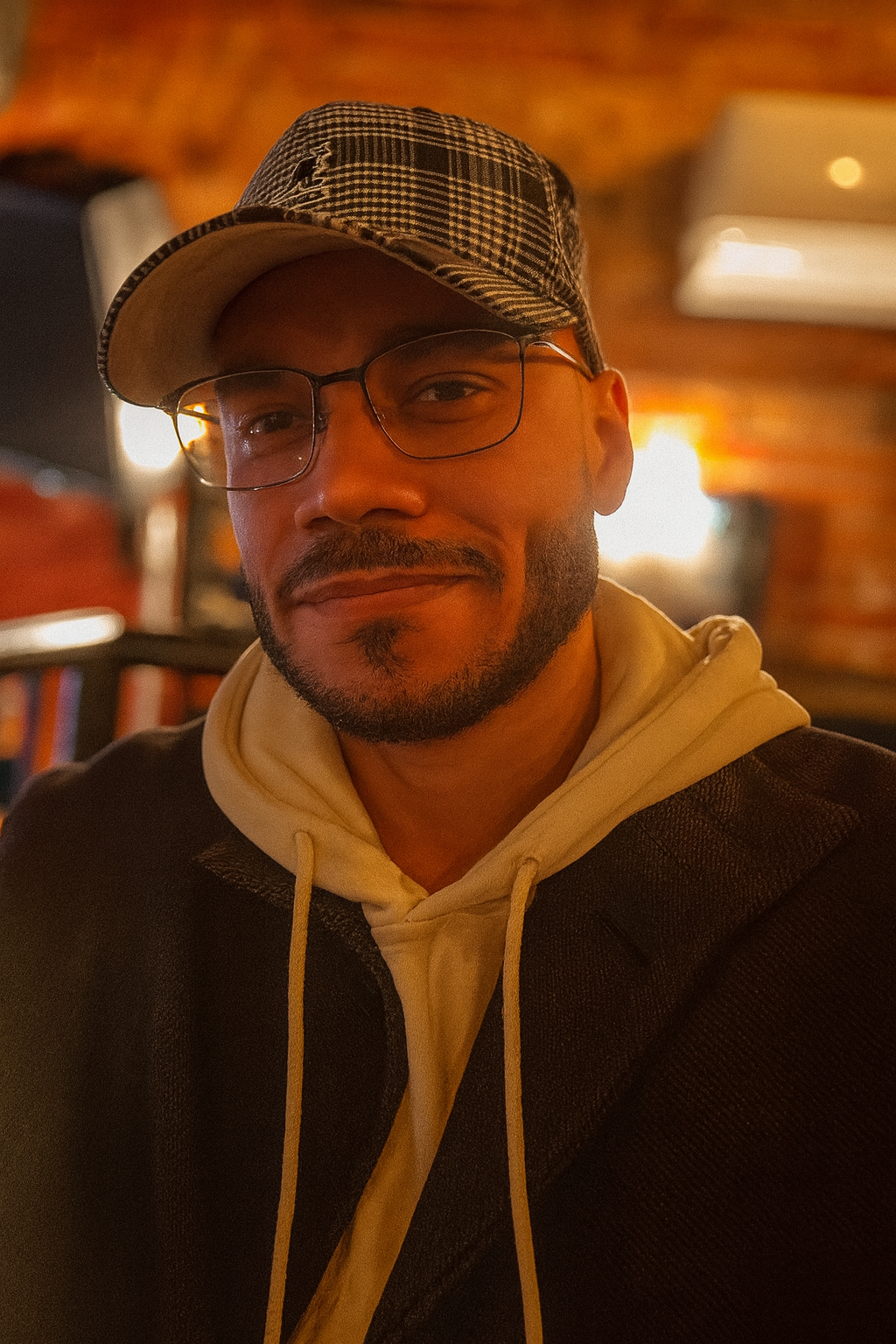
- Gossfield in 2025
- Born: Deondray Gossett; Los Angeles, California, U.S.
- Education: California State University, Northridge
- Occupations: Director; screenwriter; producer; actor
- Years active: 1993–present
- Notable work: The DL Chronicles; The Chadwick Journals; The Chi
- Spouse: Quincy LeNear Gossfield (m. 2014)
- Awards: GLAAD Media Award; NAACP Image Award nominations

Deondray Gossfield (né Gossett) is an American television director, producer, and writer. He is best known for co-creating the LGBTQ+ anthology series The DL Chronicles alongside his husband, Quincy LeNear Gossfield, and for his work as a producer and director on America's Best Dance Crew, The Sing-Off, Make Your Mark Shake It Up Dance Off, Kocktails with Khloé, and the Showtime series The Chi, where he currently serves as co-executive producer and series director.

== Early life and education ==
Gossfield was born in Los Angeles, California. He attended California State University, Northridge, earning a Bachelor of Arts degree in psychology.

Deondray Gossfield began his performing arts training in Southern California, where he was a member of the Young Americans, a performing arts show choir known for its emphasis on music, dance, and ensemble performance.

During his early career, Gossfield participated in the Drama Teachers Association of Southern California (DTASC) festivals, where he received multiple awards for his performances. He won first place at the DTASC Shakespeare Festival for his portrayal of Romeo, becoming the first African American to do so. He also received additional recognition for performances in Othello and The Colored Museum.

These early experiences in classical and dramatic performance contributed to his foundation as a storyteller, preceding his transition into film and television.

== Career ==
Gossfield has served as producer and director on several major network and cable series including America's Best Dance Crew, The Sing-Off, Make Your Mark Shake It Up Danceoff, and The Roast of Justin Bieber. In 2023, Gossfield and Quincy joined the Showtime/Paramount+ series The Chi as directors and Co-Executive Producers. Season 6 earned one NAACP win and one nomination in 2025.

== Personal life ==
Gossfield married Quincy LeNear during a live mass wedding officiated by Queen Latifah during the performance of "Same Love" by Macklemore & Ryan Lewis at the 56th Annual Grammy Awards in 2014.

== Awards and honors ==
Year	Award	Category	Work	Result
2007	GLAAD Media Award	Outstanding Drama Series	The DL Chronicles	Won
2020	NAACP Image Award	Outstanding Reality Program/Reality Competition Series	Sunday Best	Nominated

== Filmography ==
=== Television ===
Year	Title	Role	Notes
2007	The DL Chronicles	Creator / Director / Showrunner	Series
2014–2016	Sing-Off, America's Best Dance Crew	Producer	Various
2021–Present	The Chadwick Journals	Creator / Executive Producer	Streaming series
2023–Present	The Chi	Co-Executive Producer / Director	Showtime series
