= Barton Fitzpatrick =

American actor

- Born: March 13, 1995 (age 31); Chicago, Illinois
- Occupation: Actor
- Years active: 2016–present

Barton Fitzpatrick is an American actor. He is best known for playing Reg Taylor in the drama series The Chi.

== Early life ==
Fitzpatrick was born and raised in Chicago, Illinois. He attended Beasley and Kenwood High School. He competed in the August Wilson Monologue Competition.

== Career ==
Early in his career he made one-off appearances in the shows Chicago Med, Chicago P.D. and Chicago Justice. His biggest role of his career so far was playing the antagonist Reg Taylor in the drama series The Chi. Despite his character seemingly killed off in season 2 of the show he made a shock return in season 7. His other most notable role was playing Blaxton in the crime drama series Power Book IV: Force.

== Personal life ==
When he is not acting he likes to sketch. He is also an accomplised musician and sings the blues for modern listeners. His music idols are Stevie Wonder and Smokey Robinson. His older cousin is actor Larenz Tate.

== Filmography ==
=== Film ===
| Year | Title | Role | Notes |
|---|---|---|---|
| 2016 | Walkers in the City | Jason | Short |
| 2016 | Rock City Police | Ramble | Short |
| 2016 | Room 13 | Tucker | Short |
| 2019 | iMatter | Sean | Short |
| 2020 | White People Money | Kareem | |
| 2020 | Temp | Husband | Short |
| 2022 | Wayward | Micah | |
| 2023 | A Haitian Wedding | Michael | |
| 2023 | Everything Is Both | Scar | |
| 2023 | Primary Position | Chris Coles | |
| 2024 | My Valentine Wedding | Trayvon | |
| 2024 | Beyond the Likes | Victor Stanton | |
| 2024 | Let Us Make Eve | Michael | |
| 2024 | Toxic Harmony | Tyree | |
| 2025 | Black Cats | Loom | |

=== Television ===
| Year | Title | Role | Notes |
|---|---|---|---|
| 2016 | Chicago Med | GSW Patient | Episode; Malignent |
| 2017 | Chicago Justice | Chris Stackhouse | Episode; Drill |
| 2018 | Chicago P.D. | Jamal Tate | Episode; Anthem |
| 2019 | Empire | Prophetic the Poet | Episode; Do You Remember Me? |
| 2021 | We Stay Looking | Killa D | Episode; Enjoy Prison, N*gga |
| 2022 | Power Book IV: Force | Blaxton | 4 episodes |
| 2023 | Legacy | Vee | 3 episodes |
| 2018–2019, 2025–2026 | The Chi | Reg Taylor | 36 episodes |
