= Jeremy Meeks =

American model and convict (born 1984)

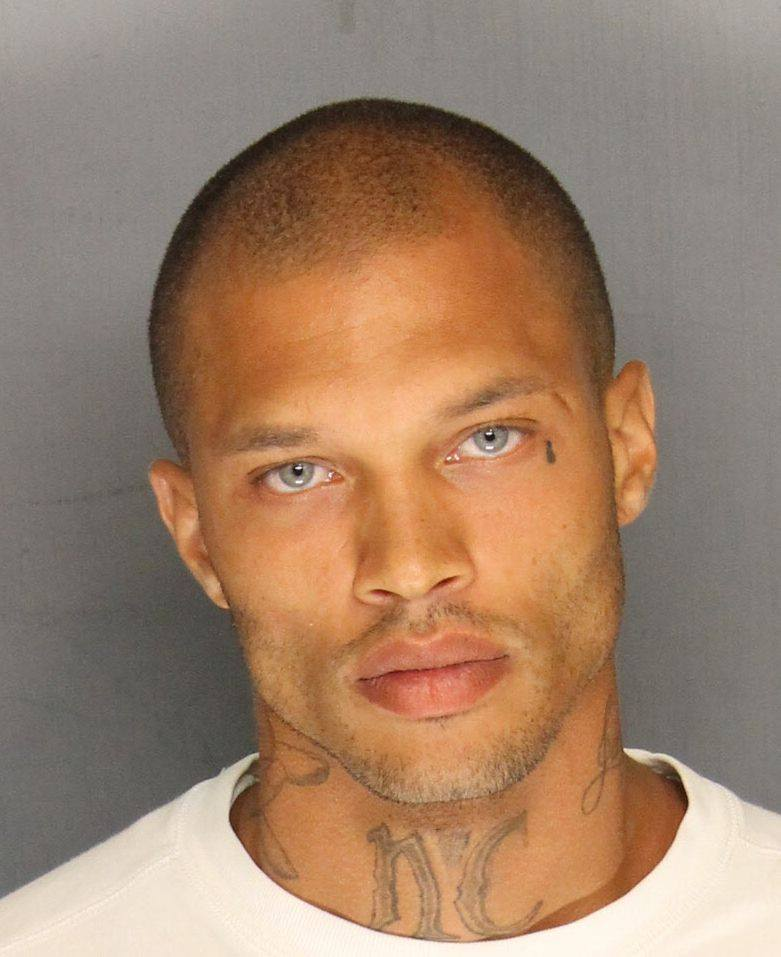
- The mugshot of Meeks that went viral after its publication by the City of Stockton Police Department
- Born: Jeremy Ray Meeks; February 7, 1984 (age 42); Tacoma, Washington, US
- Occupation: Model
- Years active: 2016–present
- Spouse: Melissa Meeks (m. 2008; div. 2018)
- Partner: Chloe Green (2017–2019)
- Children: 2
- Modeling information
- Height: 6 ft 1 in (185 cm)
- Hair color: Black
- Eye color: Blue
- Agency: White Cross Management (Los Angeles)

Jeremy Ray Meeks (born February 7, 1984) is an American fashion model, actor, and former gang member. A former member of the Crips street gang, Meeks was arrested in 2014 during a gang sweep called Operation Ceasefire in Stockton, California. Afterward, police posted his mugshot on Facebook, which went viral due to his physical attractiveness. He was convicted on federal charges of being a felon in possession of a firearm and grand theft. Meeks' mugshot was noticed by modeling agencies and, upon his release from Mendota Federal Correctional Institution in March 2016, he began a modeling career.

== Early life ==
Meeks was born in Tacoma, Washington, on February 7, 1984.

In 2002, Meeks was charged with robbery and corporal injury to a child, assaulting a 16-year-old boy. He was sentenced to serve two years in a California prison, during which he admitted to being a member of the North Side Gangster Crips.

== 2014 arrest and viral popularity ==
On June 18, 2014, Stockton Police Department arrested Meeks and three other men in a multi-agency law enforcement mission dubbed Operation Ceasefire. Meeks was listed as a "convicted felon, arrested for felony weapon charges". He denied the charges. The same day, mugshots of several men, including Meeks, were posted on the Stockton Police Department's Facebook page.

Within 24 hours of the photos being posted on the department's page, Meeks' photo had acquired more than 15,000 "likes" and 3,700 comments, mostly from women enamored of his looks. The next day, on June 19, news and entertainment site BuzzFeed recognized Meeks' mugshot as a "meme".

On Friday, June 20, Twitter fans created the hashtag "#feloncrushfriday" in honor of Meeks' mugshot. Stockton Police Department spokesman Joe Silva acknowledged that the mugshot had received more attention than any other mugshot since they launched the Facebook page in 2012. As of April 2021, the post had received 95,000 "likes", 24,000 comments, and 11,000 shares.

A July 2014 court hearing was set, while Meeks awaited his trial at the San Joaquin County Jail, with his bail set at $1,050,000. Meeks' mother, Katherine Angier, set up a GoFundMe page in an attempt to raise money for his bail. His sister, Leanna Rominger, used the proceeds from the campaign to hire a defense lawyer for him.

On July 3, 2014, a Northern California grand jury indicted Meeks on a charge of possession of a semiautomatic .45 caliber pistol that was transported across state borders in the commission of grand theft. The state dropped its charges against Meeks and his case was handed over to federal prosecutors.

On February 5, 2015, Meeks was convicted by a federal judge of one count of being a felon in possession of a firearm, and was sentenced to 27 months in federal prison. The judge further ordered Meeks to participate in the 500-Hour Bureau of Prisons Substance Abuse Treatment Program. He was incarcerated at Mendota Federal Correctional Institution. Meeks served 13 months of the sentence, and was released from prison March 8, 2016, after which he was ordered to reside in a transitional housing facility for a few weeks.

== Modeling career ==
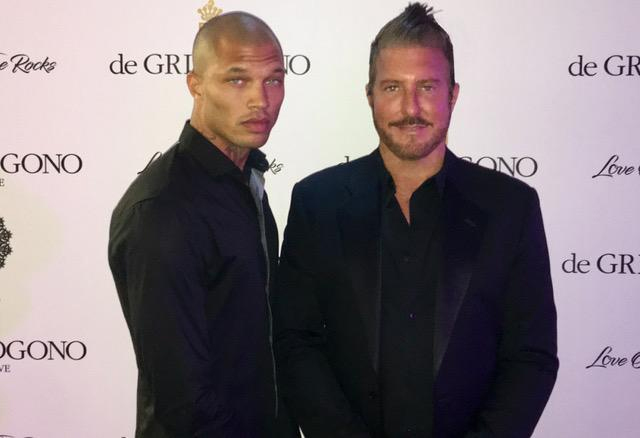
Meeks with fashion photographer Jim Jordan at the 2017 Cannes Film Festival

On March 4, 2015, photographer and talent agent Jim Jordan's company White Cross Management confirmed having signed a management contract with Meeks. Jordan began working with Meeks upon the latter's release from the transitional housing facility which he was ordered to stay in after his March 2016 release from prison. Meeks' first modeling headshot was published in June 2016. White Cross Management continues to manage Meeks, and featured Meeks on the cover of their online magazines James Magazine USA Vol. VII and White Cross Magazine Vol. 01.

On February 13, 2017, Meeks made his runway debut for the Philipp Plein Fall/Winter 2017/2018 Women's And Men's Fashion Show collection at the New York Public Library during New York Fashion Week. In April, Meeks was scheduled for an appearance and series of photo shoots in the United Kingdom, but was barred from entering the country upon landing in Heathrow Airport. Meeks was interrogated by officials and then sent back to the United States. Meeks made his European runway debut in May 2017 at Philipp Plein’s resort 2018 presentation at the 2017 Cannes Film Festival. He then walked for Plein’s spring/summer 2018 sport collection on June 18 during Milan Fashion Week.

In August 2017, Meeks appeared in a campaign for Israeli sunglasses fashion house Carolina Lemke, partially owned by Israeli model Bar Refaeli. The campaign tagged Meeks' background as different from Refaeli's, who appeared in the campaign alongside Meeks, stating, "There has never been a mix like this". In December, Meeks appeared on the cover of the men's fashion magazine MMScene.

Meeks appeared in Tommy Hilfiger's Spring 2018 fashion show in Milan on February 25 of the same year. The show was a collaboration with model Gigi Hadid and ran during Milan Fashion Week. He appeared on the cover of the Summer 2018 issues of the fashion and lifestyle magazines FV and L'Officiel Hommes.

In September 2019, Frankfurt-based fashion company Fashion Concept GmbH announced a $15 million partnership with Meeks to build a fashion line in his name. The fashion line launched in July 2020. In 2022, Fashion Concept GmbH filed for bankruptcy after alleged fraudulent practices were discovered.

In November 2019, Meeks became brand ambassador for fragrance line Gisada Switzerland's fragrance duo "Gisada Ambassador."

== Acting career ==
In January 2018, Meeks flew to Moscow to appear in the music video "Wi-Fi" by Russian pop singer Olga Buzova.

Meeks made his feature film debut in 2020 with the BET+ streaming feature Trigger. In 2021, Meeks appeared in the independent feature film Secret Society; the film was directed by Jamal Hill, and is based on the book of the same name by Miasha Coleman.

=== Filmography ===
Film and television appearances by Jeremy Meeks
Year	Title	Role	Notes
2020	Trigger	Trey Mass	TV movie
2020	True to the Game 2	Saleem	
2021	Dutch	Craze	
2021	Secret Society	Khalil	
2021	Dear Best Friend	Jamie	TV movie
2021	True to the Game 3	Saleem	
2022	The Wrong High School Sweetheart	Camp Sweetheart	TV movie
2022	Circumstances 3	Big L	
2022	Unfair Exchange	Chad Perry	
2022	Secret Society 2: Never Enough	Khalil	
2023	Dance For Me	Seth Calloway	TV movie
2023	Secret Society 3: 'Til Death	Khalil	
2024	Dutch II: Angel's Revenge	Craze	
TBA	Beach Chain	Dwayde	
TBA	Doggmen	Sparks	
TBA	Rise of the Tarrogan	Dime	

== Book ==
Meeks released an autobiographical book titled Model Citizen: The Autobiography of Jeremy Meeks in December 2024.

== Personal life ==
Meeks has a child with Melissa Meeks, to whom he was married from 2008 to 2018.

In June 2017, it was reported that Meeks was in a relationship with Chloe Green, the daughter of British businessman Philip Green. Meeks had gone on a trip to Turkey, where the first images of him and Green came out on a yacht. On May 29, 2018, Green gave birth to the couple's son. In August 2019, it was reported the couple had amicably split and were selling their joint London home.
