= Kristiana Rae Colón =

American poet

Kristiana Rae Colón (born April 16, 1986) is an American poet, playwright, actor, educator, Cave Canem Fellow, creator of #BlackSexMatters and co-founder of the #LetUsBreathe Collective. She was awarded 2017 Best Black Playwright by The Black Mall. Her plays have premiered in Chicago, New York, London, and other cities. Colón is the author of several plays and poems. She earned the 2013 Drinking Gourd Poetry Prize. Her play, Octagon, won Colón the Arizona Theatre Company 2014 National Latino Playwriting Award. Kristiana's writing, producing, and organizing work to radically reimagine power structures, our complicity in them, and visions for liberation.

== Early life and education ==
Colón is the daughter of April and former Alderman Rey Colón, who met during their college years in a writing class. They both encouraged their children to be involved in the arts. She was born and raised in Chicago, where she attended gifted elementary schools and graduated with honors from Whitney Young High School. Colón earned a Bachelor of Arts from the University of Chicago, and a Master of Fine Arts in Writing at the School of the Art Institute of Chicago.

== Activism ==
Colón is the co-director of the #LetUsBreathe Collective and co-creator of #BlackSexMatters

The Let Us Breathe Collective is an alliance of artists and activists who want to tell the stories of protestors and people involved in #BlackLivesMatter. Colón is the executive director of the group. The collective formed in 2014 as a way to raise funds to bring tear gas protection to protesters in Ferguson. Let Us Breath Collective protested in July 2016, marching and chaining their bodies together to block the entrance of the Chicago Police Department's Homan Square facility.

== Theatre ==
but i cd only whisper was premiered at the Arcola Theater in London in 2012.

Florissant & Canfield tells a vivid epic about Ferguson, in the midst of the Black Lives Matter movement, a newly formed alliance of protesters are forced to put their nascent ideologies to the test in the quest for new visions of justice. This production was inspired by the Ferguson protesters along with the Let Us Breathe Collective and Lost Voices, and it was featured on the 2016 Hedgebrook Women Playwrights Festival.

Good Friday (2016) is an all-women production that tackles topics like millennial feminism, sexual violence, and gun violence.

Her play, Octagon, is full of complicated female characters who are preparing for a slam poetry contest. Octagon won the Arizona Theatre Company National Latino Playwriting Award in 2014. The play had its world premier at the Arcola Theater in September 2015. The Chicago Tribune wrote that "'Octagon' sometimes feels more like an octopus, with many tentacles reaching in multiple directions. But by the end, it proves exhilarating, exhausting and plain exciting. Just like a great poetry slam should be."

One Week in Spring, laced with hip hop and poetry, bursts with preconceptions about taboos such as women's sexuality, and concepts of consent that have been shaped and re-shaped by millennial social media. This particular production it was developed in the MFA Writing program at the School of the Art Institute of Chicago, where it also received its first staged reading.

Her play, Tilikum, will have its world premiere in June 2018 at the Sideshow Theatre Company in Chicago.

== Poetry ==
Colón earned the Drinking Gourd Poetry Prize in 2013 for her chapbook, promised instruments. Her poems have been featured in the anthology, The BreakBeat Poets: New American Poetry in the Age of Hip-Hop (2015).
