= Draya Michele =

American fashion designer (born 1985)

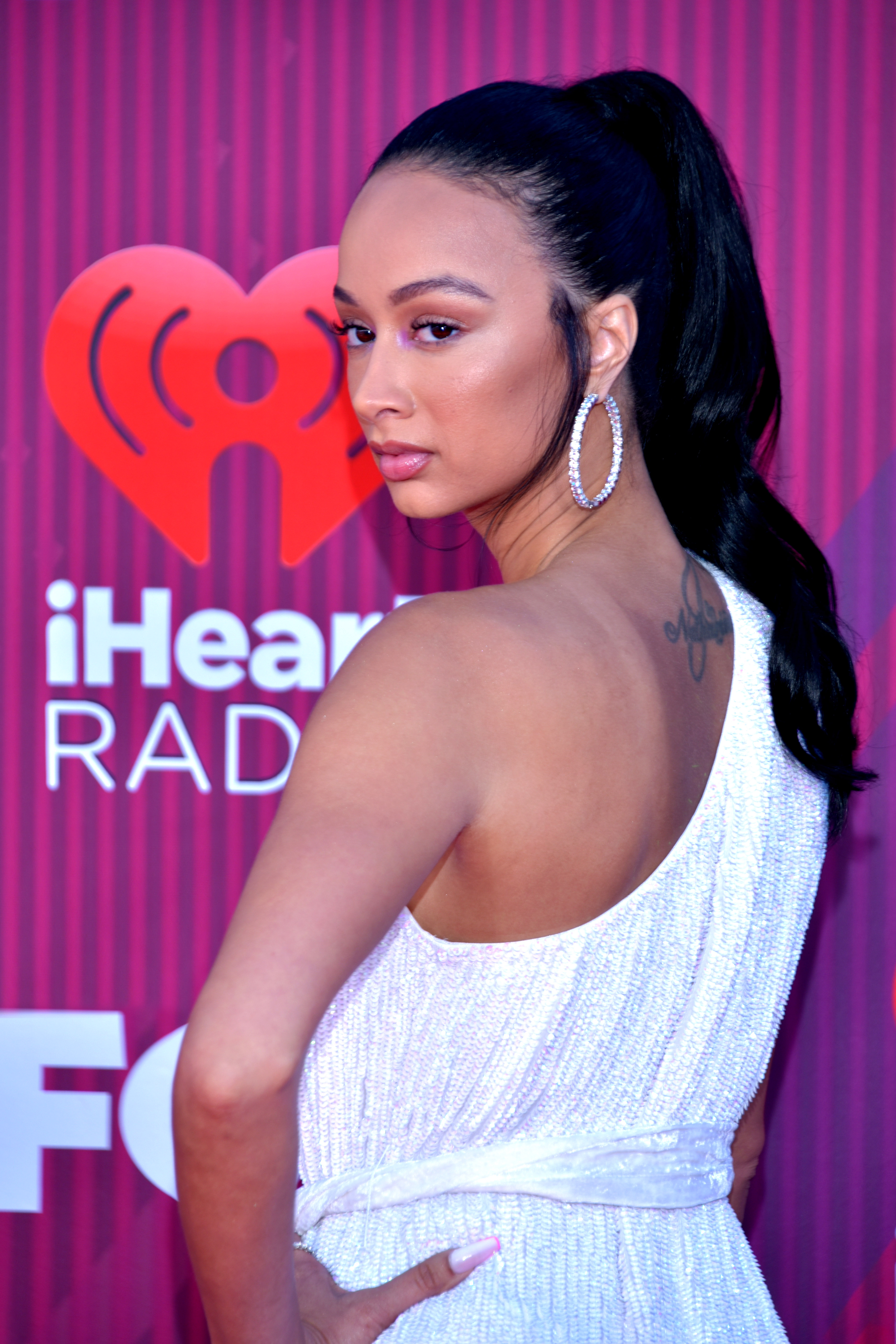
- Draya Michele in 2019
- Born: Andraya Michele Howard; January 23, 1985 (age 41); Reading, Pennsylvania, U.S.
- Occupations: Social media personality; actress
- Years active: 2011–present
- Known for: Basketball Wives LA
- Children: 3

Andraya Michele Howard (born January 23, 1985) is an American social media personality and actress.

== Early life ==
Andraya Michele Howard was born and raised in Reading, Pennsylvania.

== Career ==
Howard first came to the attention of the public as the girlfriend of entertainer Chris Brown. She was part of the Season 1 cast of the VH1 reality series Basketball Wives LA in 2011, and in the same year made her first scripted acting debut in TV One's Will to Love opposite Keshia Knight Pulliam and Marques Houston. She remained as part of the cast of Basketball Wives LA until her departure at the end of the show's fourth season in 2015. She had a supporting role in the 2016 feature film The Perfect Match (with Terrence J and Cassie Ventura).

She owns a number of fashion lines: her swimwear line Mint Swim launched in 2011, and her lifestyle clothing line Fine Ass Girls launched in 2013. In November 2016, she launched another clothing line, Beige & Coco.

== Personal life ==
She has three children, one of whom she welcomed with her ex-fiancé Orlando Scandrick. She is currently dating Jalen Green of the NBA's Phoenix Suns; they welcomed a daughter born on May 12, 2024.

She is a Black American.

== Filmography ==
- Basketball Wives LA as herself (2011)
- Real Husbands of Hollywood as herself (2013)
- Will to Love as Candice Koleto (2015)
- The Perfect Match as Holly (2016)
- Bring Out the Lady as Dody Monroe (2016)
- True to the Game as Cherelle (2017)
- 'Til Death Do Us Part as Amanda (2017)
- We Belong Together as Tracy Jacobs/Laura Santiago (2018)
- All In as Gina (2018)
- Star as Chloe David (2018)
- Tales as Viveca (TV Series) (2019)
- Don Toliver - Cardigan (Music Video) (2020)
- L.A.'s Finest as Charlotte Hume (TV Series, 2 episodes) (2020)
- The Fight That Never Ends as Beverly Williams (TV Movie) (2021)
- The Sound of Christmas as Chloe (2022)
- Be Someone as Mia (TV Series) (2023)
- Legacy as Kat (TV Series) (2023)
- Premeditated as Amanda (2024)
- Somnium as Max (2025)
