= Power: Origins =

Upcoming American drama series

- Genre: Crime drama
- Created by: Courtney A. Kemp; Sascha Penn
- Based on: Power created by Courtney A. Kemp
- Starring: Spence Moore; Charlie Mann; Mekai Curtis; Zuri Reed; Camila Perez
- Country of origin: United States
- Original language: English

Production
- Executive producers: Courtney A. Kemp; 50 Cent; Sascha Penn; Mark Canton; Kevin Fox; Pete Chatmon; Chris Salek
- Production companies: Ballpoint Productions; End of Episode, Inc.; G-Unit Film & Television Inc.; Atmosphere Television; Canton Entertainment; CBS Studios; Lionsgate Television

Original release
- Network: Starz

Related
- Power Universe

Power: Origins is an upcoming American crime drama television series created by Courtney A. Kemp and Sascha Penn that is set to premiere on Starz.

== Premise ==
It is the fourth upcoming spin-off and second prequel of Power. Set in the late 1990s and early 2000s, it will follow the early lives of James St. Patrick aka Ghost and Tommy Egan. It will be the fifth installment of the Power Universe and a sequel to Power Book III: Raising Kanan. Starz described the series as "a fun, rambunctious exploration of a new time period in the Power franchise," and stated that it centers on "the unbridled audacity of young men on the rise, determined to become legends in the game."

== Cast ==
=== Main ===
- Spence Moore II as James "Ghost" St. Patrick
- Charlie Mann as Thomas "Tommy" Egan
- Mekai Curtis as Kanan Stark
- Zuri Reed as Tasha Green
- Camila Perez as Angela Valdes

=== Recurring ===
- Jennifer Ferrin as Kate Egan
- Lizzy DeClement as Jill Wexler
- Lenny Platt as Lenny Seidell
- Armani Gabriel as J-Boogs
- Everett Osborne as Omay Moreau
- Jason Dirden as Traymont Stinson
- Kelly McCreary as Melanie Rivers
- Hill Harper as Burns
- Nadia Dajani as Teresa Boselli
- Damon Gupton as Glover Archibald
- Tonya Pinkins as Grandma Charlayne
- Dominic Rains as Fred Drexel
- Leslie Grossman as Florence "Flossie" Siegel
- Asjha Cooper as Jarita

== Production ==
=== Development ===
In March 2024, Starz announced that Power: Origins the prequel series of Power about the origin story of Ghost and Thomas "Tommy" Egan was in development. Sascha Penn is the executive producer for the series, alongside the creator of Power Courtney A. Kemp through her production company End of Episode, Curtis “50 Cent” Jackson through G-Unit Films and Television Inc., Mark Canton through Canton Entertainment, Pete Chatmon who also serves as director and Chris Selak, with Lionsgate Television producing the series. In June 2025, it was revealed that the series had opened its writing rooms, with Penn serving as showrunner. In July 2025, it was announced that Starz had greenlighted the series, and it would consist of 18 episodes.

=== Casting ===
In July 2025, it was announced that Mekai Curtis would reprise the role of early adult Kanan Stark in the series, which he has portrayed in Power Book III: Raising Kanan. In September 2025, Spence Moore and Charlie Mann were cast as "Ghost" and "Tommy" respectively. In December 2025, Jennifer Ferrin, Lizzy DeClement, Lenny Platt, Armani Gabriel, Everett Osborne and Jason Dirden were cast in recurring roles. In January 2026, Kelly McCreary, Hill Harper, Nadia Dajani, Damon Gupton, Tonya Pinkins were cast in recurring roles. In February 2026, Dominic Rains joined the recurring cast of the series. In March 2026, Zuri Reed was cast as series regular, playing the younger version of Tasha St. Patrick of Power. In July 2026, Asjha Cooper joined the cast as a series regular. Leslie Grossman joined the recurring cast in August 2026.

=== Filming ===
In December 2025, it was confirmed that the production of the series got underway in New York and by August 2026 it was confirmed to be over.
