= Angela Valdes =

Fictional character from Power

- Power character
- First appearance: "Not Exactly How We Planned"; 2014
- Last appearance: "When This Is Over" / "Murderers" (alive) (Note: Valdes was gunned down by Tommy Egan (in the episode finale of season 5) during a secret meet-up with James "Ghost" St. Patrick. Tommy's intentions was to shoot Ghost from the back but Valdes pushed Ghost aside and took the bullet. She was pronounced dead approximately 10 minutes later in the premiere of season 6.); 2019 "Exactly How We Planned" (flashback); 2020
- Created by: Courtney A. Kemp
- Portrayed by: Lela Loren
- Date of birth: 1980
- Date of death: 2019
- Status: Deceased
- Franchise: Power Universe

In-universe information
- Full name: Angela Carolina Valdes
- Aliases: Angie; AUSA Angela Valdes
- Nicknames: Bruja; JLo (Note: In a text message (in episode 6 of season 5) Tommy Egan referred to Angela Valdes as JLo when he wanted her to turn on the tracking device which he placed to Dre's automobile.)
- Gender: Female
- Occupation: Federal prosecutor
- Affiliation: FBI
- Family: Paz Valdes (sister); Nestor Valdes (father); Junior Valdes (nephew)
- Significant others: Greg Knox (boyfriend; deceased); James St. Patrick (affair, lover; deceased); Steve Tampio (one-night stand)
- Origin: Puerto Rican
- Nationality: American
- Home: Jamaica, Queens

Seasons
- 1; 2; 3; 4; 5
- List of Power episodes

Angela Valdes, portrayed by Lela Loren, is a fictional character from the Starz original television drama series Power. She was a Puerto Rican federal prosecutor whose goal and mission was to solve the mystery behind the infamous "Ghost" until she realized she had been in love with him the entire time.

Valdes was caught in a crossfire and took a bullet for her lover James 'Ghost' St. Patrick (Omari Hardwick). She was mistakenly murdered by Tommy Egan (Joseph Sikora) after Egan found out Ghost was working with Valdes to put him away for the murder of his father Tony Teresi (William Sadler).

Angela, Tommy and James grew up together in Jamaica, Queens and attended the same school where she dated the latter, James. However, she moved abroad for 18 years to further her studies which resulted in cutting all ties with James until she found her way back to him in New York.

== Backstory ==
Valdes was born and raised in Jamaica, Queens where she met her childhood friends, Tommy Egan and James St. Patrick. They went to the same school where Angela dated James. She moved from Queens to further her studies and after almost two decades fate led her to her high school lover in New York City. Angela was the younger sister of Paz Valdes (Elizabeth Rodriguez) and the daughter of Nestor Valdes (Jamie Tirelli).

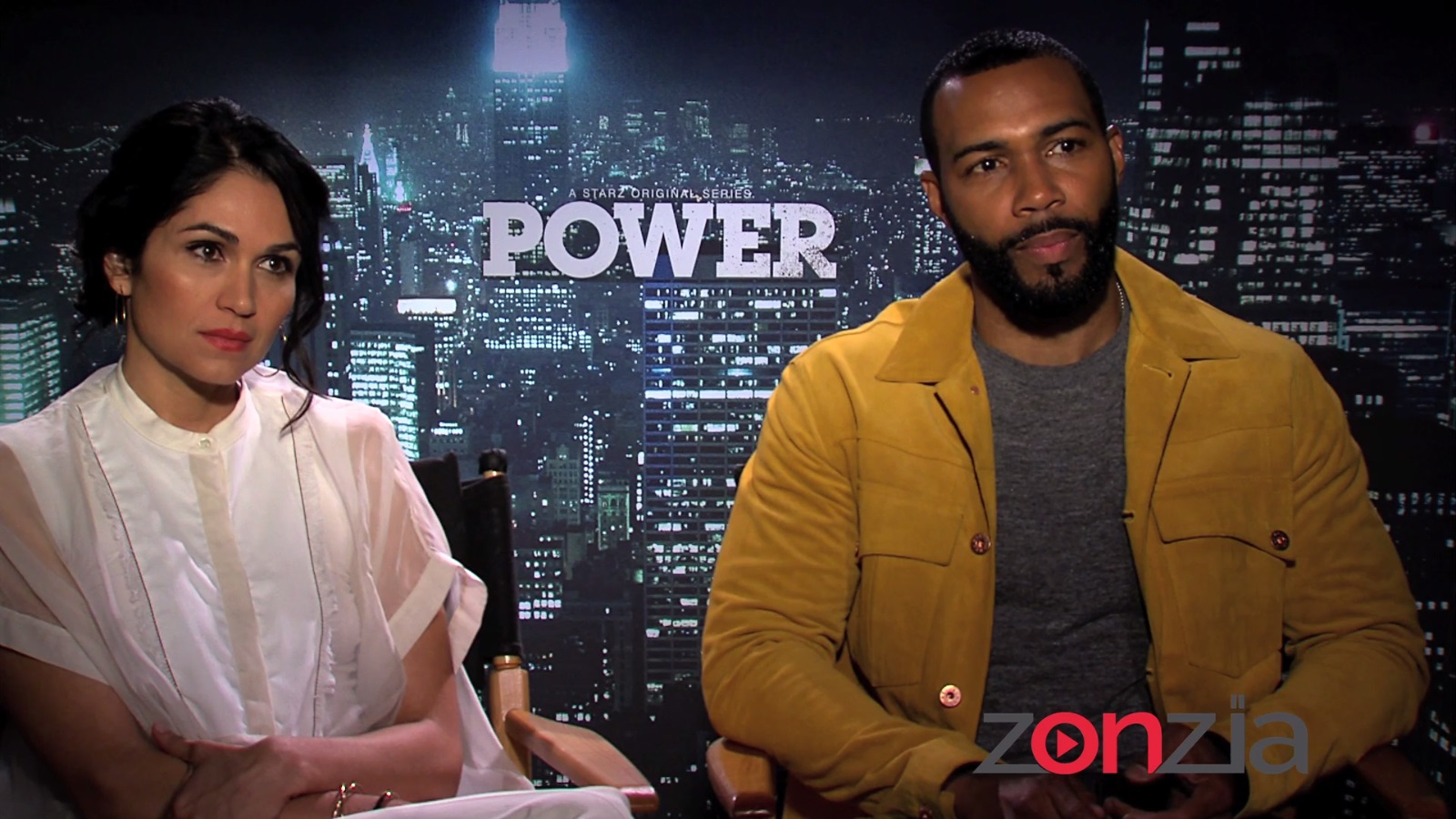
Lela Loren and Omari Hardwick interviewed by Behind the Velvet Rope TV about their roles on television series Power.

== Storyline ==
=== Season 1 ===
Valdes landed an attorney job in New York where Ghost and Tommy opened their night club, Truth. Her main goal was to put Filipe Lobos behind bars through any means necessary, she had Nomar Arcielo (Vinicius Zorin-Machado) as an informant to get nearly all the locations and dates of the rendezvous the Lobos Cartel and other drug dealers were conducting.

Although she was in love with her then boyfriend, Greg Knox (Andy Bean), things changed the very minute she gazed at Ghost. However, Ghost was married to Tasha St. Patrick (Naturi Naughton) with three kids (Incl. Tariq St. Patrick, portrayed by Michael Rainey Jr.) but that simply could not stand in the way of the love they shared together.

Valdes thought that since it was almost impossible to nail Lobos (Enrique Murciano) for drug trafficking, it would be better to get him through his distributors which Normar identified as Ghost after they made him wear a wire.

While Ghost was more fixated on going legitimately and open a new night club in Miami, Egan had other plans since their business was secretly being sabotaged by Kanan Stark (Curtis "50 Cent" Jackson) from the inside of his prison cell, Ruiz (Luis Antonio Ramos) was stabbed half to death by Pink Sneakers (portrayed by Leslie Lopez). Pink Sneakers was working for Kanan and her mission was to assassinate Ghost, which she missed at TRUTH and mistakenly shot Holly Weaver (portrayed by Lucy Walters).

Normar lost focus of what's important and Ruiz found out about him and his daughter, Ruiz sent Egan after Normar to murder him, Normar tried reaching out Valdes sadly she was preoccupied and Normar met his maker in Queens where he spooked Tommy by calling him Ghost. Normar fed Valdes false information about Ghost and he false identified half of Tommy Egan's face to the sketch artist before his demise.

=== Season 2 ===
Angela and her federal colleagues had Egan's girlfriend, Holly Weaver taken into custody to ask her what she knows about Ghost, when Angela discovered crucial information she couldn't handle, which is that her lover James St. Patrick is the real Ghost. Holly sold out James and treated to tell on Angela that she is sleeping with the real Ghost to her federal colleagues but Angela wanted to save her skin and her lover's too. She made a deal with Holly Weaver to bring the murder weapon that was used to kill Rolla but she couldn't find it. Ghost was threatened by the presence of Holly as Egan trusted her and let her in on too much information concerning their drug dealing company, Ghost gave Holly a lot of money and fake ID to relocate and never come back.

Valdes thought her informant was murdered since she couldn't be found so she confronted James about the situation and he told her the fake name that Holly used to escape, Angela found her but Holly was futile to her.

While she was still pursuing the lead to indicting Filipe Lobos, she copied James's phone and got intel on everything Ghost was doing. With that being said, the duplicate phone led her to a location where Tommy Egan had a rendezvous set up for exchanging cash and drug, Tommy and Lobos where caught red handed with big bags full of cash and drugs and so they were incarcerated.

James St. Patrick hired Proctor to defend Egan in the court of law but Egan was way in too deep and was looking at a life in prison for being Ghost. However, James did not see that happening as he stole files of hidden and unauthorized evidence from Angela's apartment and handed them to Proctor to burn Angela in court, and just like that Tommy Egan happened to be a free man and Angela was at the depths of losing her job.

Greg Knox has suspicions that James St. Patrick might be the real Ghost, he confronted Valdes with the information he gathered, they tried to build a case against James through the night but Valdes had other plans. Valdes focused on the trivial and lost side of what's most important. Angela did not picture James in an orange uniform and so she went through and stabbed her ex-lover co-worker in the back to save Ghost by building a case against him for stalking her, therefore Greg was suspended effective immediately.

James went out of his way to make things work with Angela Valdes by cutting ties with contact he was affiliated with (by murdering most of them after he sent Lobos to jail with Tommy), cut off the drug dealing business and was left off with the night clubs which are legitimately active.

Angela continued seeing Ghost even after verifying his identity and everything. Greg also continued stalking Angela and threatened her that she will go down with Ghost.

=== Season 3 ===
Valdes outed federal Intel to Ghost that Lobos was still alive after Ghost attempted murder upon Lobos through Lobos's inmates. Agent Greg Knox continued pursuing Angela and Ghost collecting information trying to connect the dots to prove that James St. Patrick is the real Ghost. However, Angela kept protecting the identity of Ghost in order to herself as she was in a relationship with a notorious drug lord.

Angela happened to have a fall out with Ghost concerning their differences of a federal agent seeing a drug distributor, Ghost cut off Angela to sort his problems with Lobos.

When Lobos was being transferred to another facility accompanied by Knox, Tommy Egan and Ghost hijacked the transport, shot Greg Knox in the process and helped Lobos escape from the federal agents only to kill him.

Greg Knox threatened to apprehend Ruiz if he does not cooperate or rather accept wearing a wire around Egan, Ghost and the other dealers, Ruiz accepted but Egan found out that Ruiz had ulterior motives to kill his connect and for that Egan stabbed Ruiz to death. Angela finds comfort with Greg and proceeds to reconcile her relationship with him.

Ghost broke into Greg's apartment looking for a tape that Greg has given to Ruiz to record Tommy Egan and James St. Patrick to prove the identity of Ghost to be James St. Patrick but he found nothing but he mistakenly left his fingerprints on the window when he was leaving. Greg found a tip that Mike Sandoval (portrayed by David Fumero) was the leak in the investigation of the murder of Filipe Lobos and he was planning to open a case against Mike but Mike had different plans, Mike murdered Greg Knox and planted evidence stating that Greg Knox was the leak. The Lobos case was closed as the leak and suspect were both dead but Angela found the prints on the window and ran them for a match and found out it was Ghost, Angela then went to TRUTH, Ghost was happy to see Angela but unfortunately Angela was there to apprehend Ghost for the murder of Greg Knox of which Ghost knew nothing about.

=== Season 4 ===
Following the apprehension of Ghost by Angela, a lot of evidence against Ghost implying that he killed Greg was more than enough that the jury was planning to put him on a death row if he was found guilty of killing a federal agent. They found his fingerprints outside the victim's apartment's window and Ghost's DNA under the victim's fingernails. Ghost then attended several court dates with Proctor as his main attorney and Terry Silver (Brandon Victor Dixon) assisting Proctor. The prosecution later made an argument that Proctor made a conflict of interest as he previously represented Tommy Egan, therefore he's not allowed to represent Ghost. With that being said, Proctor was removed from the case making Terry Silver the only attorney representing Ghost. Proctor went on in prison to inform Ghost about the sudden change of events. Proctor visited Angela Valdes drunk to tell her that Ghost did not murder agent Knox and that he had a choice to flip on her but he chose not to. After Proctor left, Valdes pulled out the surveillance footage of TRUTH the night agent Knox was murdered and the footage had no implications of Ghost hiding the murder weapon at his workplace which then made Valdes think Ghost had no hand in Greg Knox's murder.

Valdes was summoned in court to take a stand and answer questions under oath, she said after she witnessed the tapes she now believes James St. Patrick is guilty of the murder of the federal agent even if it is at cost of her job, she still believes James is innocent and being framed. The jury lifted all claims and charges laid forth against James St. Patrick and he was pronounced a free man as he was exonerated. James thanked Angela for proving his innocence but Angela told him that he may have not done this one, however they both know James is not innocent.

Special agent Valdes formed a team and started investigating Mike Sandoval concerning the cellphone that was connected to Filipe Lobos which was pinpointed in their workplace. Sandoval found out about Valdes building a case to indict him and went to visit Valdes armed and ready to pull the trigger, but he did not know that other federal agents were on his tail and ready to cuff, as Sandoval pulled out a gun and had Valdes at gunpoint, Valdes managed to defend herself and turn the events as she shot Sandoval once and had him at gunpoint, Sandoval was apprehended and sent to prison where he was murdered at the order of Ghost, Tommy Egan and Joseph Proctor.
