= Spence Moore II =

American actor (born 1997)

- Born: Spence Duane Moore II; December 16, 1997 (age 28); St. Louis, Missouri, U.S.
- Occupation: Actor
- Years active: 2016–present
- Known for: Five Points; A.P. Bio; All American
- Children: 1

Spence Duane Moore II (born December 16, 1997) is an American actor best known for his main or recurring roles in a number of television series debuting in 2018: Five Points (2018), A.P. Bio (2018–2021), All American (2018–2024), and Brilliant Minds (2024–2026).

== Early life ==
Moore was born and raised in St. Louis, Missouri, and is the youngest of two children. Moore realized that he wanted to become an actor while preparing for his sixth grade talent show. He later starred in several short films before moving on to more mainstream roles.

== Career ==
In 2017, Moore was cast in the Facebook Watch series Five Points as part of the main cast alongside Hayley Kiyoko and Madison Pettis. Moore stated that working with Kerry Washington on the series was "life-changing". He was cast in A.P. Bio as Dan Decker. In 2018, Moore began appearing as a recurring character in the CW drama All American. In 2019, Moore is in the HBO miniseries, We Are Who We Are, which premiered in September 2020.

In 2023, Moore appeared in season 3 of Superman & Lois as Bruno Mannheim's son Matteo. Since 2024, Moore has played the lead role of Jacob Nash in the NBC medical drama Brilliant Minds.

In November 2024, Moore was announced as a cast member in independent drama Out Come the Wolves, based on the Rancid 1995 album of the same name. In September 2025, he was cast as the younger version of James "Ghost" St. Patrick in the new spin-off Power: Origins. The fifth instalment in the Power Universe which is prequel to the original Power and set many year after Power Book III: Raising Kanan. It will premiere at some point in 2027.

== Personal life ==
Moore resides in Los Angeles.

In January 2022, Moore and girlfriend, Samantha "Sammie" Cimarelli, announced they were expecting. Cimarelli gave birth to their son later that year.

Some time after the birth of their son, Moore and Cimarelli went their separate ways, with Cimarelli considering herself a 'single mama' when announcing she was pregnant with baby #2 in mid-2025. No confirmation if Moore is the father of the second baby, or someone else.

== Filmography ==
=== Film ===
Year	Title	Role	Notes	Ref.
2022	My Father's Dragon	George the Tiger (voice)		
2023	Creed III	Young Dame Anderson		
2023	Back on the Strip	Merlin		
2025	And Out Comes the Wolf		Post-production	
TBA	Going Places	TBA	Post-production	

=== Television ===
Year	Title	Role	Notes	Ref.
2016	Criminal Minds	Gabriel Lewis, 15 years old	Episode: "Mirror Image"	
2016	Last Man Standing	David	Episode: "Help Wanted"	
2017	Rebel	Amari	Episode: "Breaking Point"	
2017	Ballers	David	Episode: "Ricky-Leaks"	
2017	Lady Dynamite	Bill	Episode: "Fridge Over Troubled Daughter"	
2017–2018	StartUp	Damon	2 episodes	
2018	13 Reasons Why	Michael	5 episodes	
2018	Five Points	Eric Harper	Main role (season 1)	
2018	The Rookie	Young Campbell	Episode: "The Hawke"	
2018–2021	A.P. Bio	Dan Decker	Main role	
2018–2024	All American	Chris Jackson	Recurring role	
2019	Good Trouble	Jamal	Episode: "Less Than"	
2020	We Are Who We Are	Danny Poythress	Main role	
2021–2022	The Wonder Years	Bruce Williams	Recurring role	
2022–2023	Grown-ish	Big Brother Big Boy	6 episodes	
2023	Superman & Lois	Matteo Mannheim	Recurring role; 7 episodes	
2024	NCIS	Jared Vance	Episode: "A Thousand Yards" Season 21 Episode 7	
2024–2026	Brilliant Minds	Dr. Jacob Nash	Main role	
2027	Power: Origins	James "Ghost" St. Patrick	Main role	

=== Video games ===
Year	Title	Role	Notes	Ref.
2027	Until Dawn 2	Nate Howard		
