= List of Power episodes =

Power is an American crime drama television series created by Courtney A. Kemp that premiered on June 7, 2014, on Starz. The series follows James St. Patrick (played by Omari Hardwick), nicknamed "Ghost", owner of a popular New York City nightclub, and a major player in one of the city's biggest illegal drug networks. He struggles to balance these two lives, and the balance topples when he realizes he wants to leave the drug ring in order to support his legitimate business, and commit to his mistress.

During the course of the series, 63 episodes of Power aired over six seasons, between June 7, 2014, and February 9, 2020.

== Series overview ==
Season	Episodes	Originally released	
Season	Episodes	First released	Last released
1	8	June 7, 2014	August 2, 2014
2	10	June 6, 2015	August 15, 2015
3	10	July 17, 2016	September 25, 2016
4	10	June 25, 2017	September 3, 2017
5	10	July 1, 2018	September 9, 2018
6	15	August 25, 2019	February 9, 2020

== Episodes ==
=== Season 1 (2014) ===
High-level drug dealers James "Ghost" St. Patrick and his childhood friend Tommy Egan open the popular and exclusive Truth nightclub in New York City as a means of laundering their drug profits. Ghost, who lives in a luxury penthouse with his wife Tasha, their three children and Tasha's mother, focuses on running and marketing the nightclub in hopes of becoming a legitimate businessman. The more violent and less polished Tommy concentrates on the drug operation, which he sees as the priority. At Truth, Ghost reconnects with his long-lost childhood sweetheart, Angela Valdes, who is now a successful lawyer and, unbeknownst to Ghost, an Assistant United States Attorney (AUSA) seeking to take down Ghost and Tommy's drug supplier ("connect"), Mexican cartel chief Felipe Lobos. Ghost and Angela fall in love and begin a secret affair, while Tommy starts a relationship with Holly Weaver, a Truth server and habitual thief. Meanwhile, a mysterious female hitter, "Pink Sneakers", disrupts the drug network by attacking several couriers, killing distribution leader ("primera") Anibal Santalises, and seriously injuring another primera, Carlos "Vibora" Ruiz. Unbeknownst to Ghost and Tommy, their imprisoned mentor Kanan Stark ordered the hits, but Kanan convinces Ghost that Ghost's friend and protege Rolla is responsible, causing Ghost to kill Rolla. In the season finale, Pink Sneakers tries to kill Ghost during a party at Truth, but accidentally shoots Holly instead, then escapes. Truth is shut down by the police.

No. overall	No. in season	Title	Directed by	Written by	Original release date	U.S. viewers (millions)
1	1	"Not Exactly How We Planned"	Anthony Hemingway	Courtney A. Kemp	June 7, 2014	0.46
2	2	"Whoever He Is"	Anthony Hemingway	Courtney A. Kemp	June 14, 2014	0.61
3	3	"This Is Real"	John David Coles	Lauren Schmidt Hissrich	June 21, 2014	0.47
4	4	"Who Are You?"	John David Coles	Sascha Penn	June 28, 2014	0.56
5	5	"I Gotta Go"	George Tillman Jr.	Randy Huggins	July 12, 2014	0.53
6	6	"Who You With?"	George Tillman Jr.	Salvatore Stabile	July 19, 2014	0.75
7	7	"Loyalty"	Kari Skogland	Raphael Jackson Jr. & Damione Macedon	July 26, 2014	0.75
8	8	"Best Laid Plans"	Kari Skogland	Courtney A. Kemp & Vladimir Cvetko	August 2, 2014	1.08

=== Season 2 (2015) ===
Truth reopens under the ownership of scheming nightclub mogul Simon Stern, who forces Ghost to work for him with the possibility of Ghost buying back the club when it hits a certain profit target. Stern then sabotages Ghost's efforts and falsifies records to prevent any buyback. Kanan, newly released from prison, bonds with Tommy while plotting with Ruiz and the new primeras Drifty and Vladimir "the Serb" to kill Ghost and take over the drug distribution network. Kanan holds a grudge against Ghost, who he claims set him up for the arrest that sent him to prison for years. Ghost tries to kill Pink Sneakers, but Kanan's prison protege Dre Coleman mortally wounds her first. Before she dies she tells Ghost that Rolla didn't order the hits, which makes Ghost suspect Kanan.

Tommy and Ghost learn that Angela is an AUSA pursuing Lobos with a federal task force. Angela investigates Tommy, who she believes is the direct connection to supplier Lobos, but becomes suspicious after Holly, recovered from her wounds and under pressure from the FBI, tells her that the connection "Ghost" is James St. Patrick, not Tommy. Realizing that Tommy is more loyal to Ghost than to her, Holly leaves him with the secret help of Ghost, who wants her gone. Tasha, upset by Ghost's cheating with Angela, forces him to move out, but when she learns Angela is an AUSA, tells Ghost to continue the affair to protect Tasha and his children. Tasha starts her own affair with Ghost's driver Shawn, who is also Kanan's son. Kanan orders Shawn to kill Ghost, but after Shawn fails to do so and then rejects Kanan as his father, Kanan kills Shawn.

When Lobos comes to New York to meet with Ghost and Tommy, ostensibly to collect money but also planning to kill them, Ghost manipulates Angela into having the FBI raid the meeting before Ghost arrives. Lobos and Tommy are arrested, but defense attorney Joe Proctor gets Tommy released due to Angela's prosecutorial misconduct, based on evidence Ghost stole from her apartment. Although she beats the misconduct charge, Angela now knows that James is Ghost, a major drug dealer and killer, and she breaks up with him.

Ghost finally reclaims ownership of Truth and two other clubs after proving that Stern is an embezzler hiding assets from his estranged wife. Ghost then eliminates his own distribution network, making it look like the work of a rival Mexican cartel. He kills Drifty and Vladimir, pays off Ruiz to disappear, and recruits Dre to work with him legitimately. Ghost tries to have Lobos murdered in prison, but Lobos survives with serious injuries. Ghost and Kanan fight to the death in a basement, ending with Ghost apparently killing Kanan and burning his body. However, fire investigators later note that someone broke out of the basement, suggesting that Kanan may have survived.

Ghost tells Angela he will be a completely legitimate businessman going forward, and the two reconcile. Angela is threatened by her ex-boyfriend Greg Knox, an FBI agent whom she exploited to conduct her investigation and then ruined in order to protect Ghost. Holly returns to Tommy and tells him that Ghost forced her to disappear, causing Tommy to mistrust Ghost. Tommy then gets a call from Lobos, who was smuggled a phone by Angela's boss Mike Sandoval, the head of the Lobos Task Force. Lobos orders Tommy to kill Ghost or else Lobos will kill Tommy, Holly, and their dog, as well as Ghost.

No. overall	No. in season	Title	Directed by	Written by	Original release date	U.S. viewers (millions)
9	1	"Consequences"	Simon Cellan Jones	Courtney A. Kemp	June 6, 2015	1.43
10	2	"No Friends on the Street"	Stefan Schwartz	Gary Lennon	June 13, 2015	1.12
11	3	"Like We're Any Other Couple"	David Knoller	Randy Huggins	June 20, 2015	1.11
12	4	"You're the Only Person I Can Trust"	Bill Johnson	Lauren Schmidt	June 27, 2015	1.30
13	5	"Who You Are and Who You Want to Be"	David Knoller	Raphael Jackson Jr. & Damione Macedon	July 11, 2015	1.25
14	6	"Why Her?"	Sanford Bookstaver	Gary Lennon	July 18, 2015	1.25
15	7	"You're Not the Man"	Dennie Gordon	Vladimir Cvetko	July 25, 2015	1.26
16	8	"Three Moves Ahead"	Rob Hardy	Randy Huggins	August 1, 2015	1.04
17	9	"Time's Up"	Jim McKay	Raphael Jackson Jr. & Damione Macedon	August 8, 2015	1.37
18	10	"Ghost Is Dead"	M. J. Bassett (Note: Credited as Michael J. Bassett)	Courtney A. Kemp & Safia Dirie	August 15, 2015	1.54

=== Season 3 (2016) ===
Believing Lobos is dead, Ghost moves in with Angela and pursues a lucrative deal with hotel magnate Karen Bassett to put nightclubs in Bassett properties worldwide. The Lobos Task Force, led by Mike who is secretly Lobos’ mole, decides to keep Lobos’ survival secret and prosecute him as “John Doe”, but Angela reveals to Ghost that Lobos is still alive although this could get her the death penalty. Tommy cuts off contact with Ghost and rebuilds the drug organization with the help of Holly and Tasha. Holly finds out about Lobos’ threat and pushes Tommy to kill Ghost for their own protection, but Tommy cannot bring himself to do it. Holly finally orders a hit on Ghost without telling Tommy. When Tommy finds out, believing Ghost is already dead, he flies into a violent rage and strangles her to death, regretting it afterwards. Ghost survives the attempt on his life due to the quick action of Dean, a personal security guard he hired. Tommy and Ghost reconcile.

Greg, who had been suspended from the Lobos Task Force for stalking Angela, gets back on the task force by finding Ruiz and offering him a deal to testify against Lobos, hoping he will also implicate Ghost and Tommy, but Angela thwarts the plan. Mike arranges for Lobos to escape during a prison transport, but Tommy and Ghost kidnap Lobos during the escape attempt and kill him. Angela suspects Ghost of murdering Lobos but cannot find evidence of it, due in part to Tasha providing Ghost with an alibi. Greg, who was with the transport and was nearly killed himself, insists that someone on the task force must have leaked information and believes it was Angela.

Meanwhile, Kanan, who survived Ghost’s attempt to kill him, recovers from his serious injuries in Washington, DC under the care of his criminal cousin, the corrupt DC police officer Laverne “Jukebox” Garner. Kanan returns to New York to take revenge on Ghost and get control of Ghost’s drug network. Kanan coerces Dre into introducing him to Ghost’s teenage son Tariq, who is angry at his father for deserting the family for Angela and has begun to act out. Kanan befriends Tariq, tells him about Ghost’s criminal past, and encourages him to skip school, drink, steal, and transport contraband.

Finally free of Lobos, Ghost discovers that his security guard Dean is actually Milan, a brutal Serbian connect who threatens Ghost’s family and Angela and forces Ghost and Tommy to work for him. Milan grooms Tommy for a high-ranking position but plans to kill Ghost after he signs the nightclub deal with the Bassetts, so that Milan’s organization can take over the Bassett clubs. In order to protect Angela from Milan and from his own drug activities, Ghost breaks up with her without telling her the real reason why. Heartbroken and facing an internal investigation in the wake of the Lobos murder, Angela returns to Greg, who resumes their affair but continues to secretly investigate her and Ghost. Ghost plots to use Ruiz to bring down Milan by sending him into a meeting with Milan wearing a recording device given to Ruiz by Greg, but Tommy kills Ruiz and berates Ghost for making plans without consulting him. Greg recovers the recording device worn by Ruiz, which captured information incriminating Tommy and Ghost, but cannot be used in court because Greg's investigation was unofficial and did not follow proper procedure. Ghost breaks into Greg’s apartment looking for the recording device, but cannot find it. Despite all his attempts to link Angela and Ghost to Lobos, Greg discovers instead that Mike was Lobos' mole, causing Mike to kill Greg in Greg’s apartment and frame Greg as the mole. Angela investigates and finds Ghost’s fingerprints on Greg’s window, left by Ghost during his recent break-in.

Ghost throws a major party at Truth to celebrate finalizing the Bassett deal. After the contract is signed, Ghost and Tommy, who has turned Milan’s own organization against him, take Milan from the club at gunpoint and kill him. Tasha receives a text from Kanan, who has kidnapped and drugged Tariq with the help of Jukebox and another corrupt police officer, Raymond “Ray Ray” Jones, demanding a ransom for Tariq's return. Kanan and Jukebox plan to kill Tariq anyway after receiving the ransom. Upon returning to Truth, Ghost is confronted by Angela, who handcuffs and arrests him for the murder of Greg Knox.

No. overall	No. in season	Title	Directed by	Written by	Original release date	U.S. viewers (millions)
19	1	"Call Me James"	George Tillman Jr.	Courtney A. Kemp	July 17, 2016	2.26
20	2	"It's Never Over"	Sanford Bookstaver	Gary Lennon	July 24, 2016	1.74
21	3	"I Got This on Lock"	Lukas Ettlin	Sinchi Walter Langa	July 31, 2016	1.88
22	4	"Don't Worry, Baby"	Larysa Kondracki	Heather Zuhlke	August 7, 2016	1.72
23	5	"Help Me"	Sanford Bookstaver	Damione Macedon & Raphael Jackson Jr.	August 14, 2016	1.80
24	6	"The Right Decision"	M. J. Bassett	Vladimir Cvetko	August 21, 2016	2.11
25	7	"Don't Go"	Rob Hardy	Safia M. Dirie	August 28, 2016	1.84
26	8	"Trust Me"	Jim McKay	Gary Lennon	September 4, 2016	1.99
27	9	"I Call the Shots"	Magnus Martens	Damione Macedon & Raphael Jackson Jr.	September 18, 2016	2.04
28	10	"In My Best Interest"	M. J. Bassett	Courtney A. Kemp & Jeff Dix	September 25, 2016	2.01

=== Season 4 (2017) ===
With Ghost arrested and unable to pay a ransom, Dre agrees to pay off Kanan, Jukebox and Ray Ray to let the unconscious Tariq go free; and the ransom demand to Tasha is passed off as a practical joke. Dre still has not revealed that Slim is Kanan. Held without bail for the capital murder of Agent Greg Knox, and under investigation for alleged RICO violations, Ghost struggles to maintain the façade of a legitimate businessman in prison, while Tommy struggles to control the drug network and Dre secretly schemes to take it over and deliver it to rival suppliers, the Jimenez cartel. Ghost’s fellow inmate Tony Teresi, an aging mob capo and hitman, blackmails Ghost in order to get in touch with Tommy, later revealing to Tommy that he is Tommy's father, whom Tommy's mother Kate claimed was dead.

Mike Sandoval plants evidence to frame Ghost for Greg’s murder, but Angela begins to have doubts about Ghost’s guilt and ends up testifying in his defense, resulting in all charges against him being dismissed. She continues to investigate and eventually discovers that Mike was Greg’s killer and Lobos’ mole. Mike is arrested and Angela informs Ghost’s lawyer Terry Silver, hoping that Ghost and Tommy will kill Mike to prevent him from revealing their involvement with Lobos. Teresi has Mike killed in prison at Tommy’s request. Angela is promoted to the supervisory position formerly held by Mike.

Upon his release, Ghost discovers that Tasha, whose accounts were frozen during the investigation, accepted a large loan from Simon Stern to pay the family’s bills. As payback, Stern forces Ghost to be his partner in a real estate development that requires a Black owner. Against Stern’s wishes, Ghost supports Councilman Rashad Tate’s proposal to develop the run-down neighborhood where Ghost grew up. Tate helps Ghost develop his public image and forces Stern to change his partnership contract to benefit Ghost, but Tate makes clear that he expects favors from Ghost in return. Local waitress Maria Suarez recognizes Ghost’s voice from a TV interview as the man who shot her fiance (a hitman working with Pink Sneakers in Season 1), and goes to the Justice Department to tell her story.

Unbeknownst to his family, Tariq has been partying with Kanan and his crew and helping them commit burglaries. Jukebox pushes Kanan to carry out her original plan of kidnapping Tariq, making Ghost deliver a ransom and then killing Ghost and Tariq; however, at the last moment, Kanan chooses to spare their lives and kills Jukebox instead. Tariq helps two crew members carry out a home invasion robbery during which they murder the homeowner, putting Tariq’s life in jeopardy as a witness. Ray Ray kills the crew members and then searches for Tariq, finally catching up to him outside his school. Tariq hides while his twin sister Raina confronts Ray Ray and is shot dead. Tariq tells the police and his parents that he didn’t see who killed Raina, but goes on his own to take revenge on Ray Ray. Kanan figures out that Ray Ray killed Raina and tells Tommy and Ghost, while Tasha learns Tariq’s whereabouts from a phone trace ordered by Angela. Tommy, Ghost and Tasha all arrive just as Tariq kills Ray Ray, and help him cover it up. To protect Tariq, Tasha tells Terry Silver, with whom she has been having an affair, that she killed Ray Ray. Angela, who suspected that Ray Ray killed Raina, begins investigating his murder.

Dre disrupts the drug operation by having distributor Julio murdered, burning a shipment of product, and killing primera Father Callahan, all in furtherance of his plan to take over as connect under the Jimenez cartel. Dre promises Kanan a place in the new network, but instead tries unsuccessfully to have him killed. Kanan informs Ghost and Tommy of Dre’s duplicity, which is confirmed when all three see Dre leaving a meeting with the remaining primeras and Alicia Jimenez. In the season finale, Kanan, Ghost and Tommy join forces to go to war with the Jimenez and take down Dre.

No. overall	No. in season	Title	Directed by	Written by	Original release date	U.S. viewers (millions)
29	1	"When I Get Out"	Stefan Schwartz	Courtney A. Kemp	June 25, 2017	1.68
30	2	"Things Are Going to Get Worse"	Sanford Bookstaver	Heather Zuhlke	July 2, 2017	1.44
31	3	"The Kind of Man You Are"	Larysa Kondracki	Jeff Dix	July 9, 2017	1.72
32	4	"We're in This Together"	J. Michael Muro	Warren Hsu Leonard	July 16, 2017	1.72
33	5	"Don't Thank Me"	Sanford Bookstaver	Raphael Jackson, Jr. & Damione Macedon	July 23, 2017	1.79
34	6	"New Man"	Dennie Gordon	Gary Lennon	July 30, 2017	1.83
35	7	"You Lied to My Face"	Sanford Bookstaver	Vladimir Cvetko	August 6, 2017	1.69
36	8	"It's Done"	Hernán Otoño	Raphael Jackson, Jr. & Damione Macedon	August 13, 2017	1.81
37	9	"That Ain't Me"	Victoria Mahoney	Raphael Jackson, Jr. & Damione Macedon	August 20, 2017	1.90
38	10	"You Can't Fix This"	Rob Hardy	Courtney A. Kemp & Monica Mitchell	September 3, 2017	2.00

=== Season 5 (2018) ===
No. overall	No. in season	Title	Directed by	Written by	Original release date	U.S. viewers (millions)
39	1	"Everyone Is Implicated"	Stefan Schwartz	Courtney A. Kemp	July 1, 2018	1.55
40	2	"Damage Control"	Solvan Naim	Heather Zuhlke	July 8, 2018	0.70
41	3	"Are We on the Same Team?"	Tina Mabry	Vladimir Cvetko	July 15, 2018	1.50
42	4	"Second Chances"	Bart Wenrich	Jeff Dix	July 22, 2018	1.36
43	5	"Happy Birthday"	Sanford Bookstaver	Safia M. Dirie	July 29, 2018	1.35
44	6	"A Changed Man?"	Ami Canaan Mann	Monica Mitchell	August 5, 2018	1.33
45	7	"The Devil Inside"	Rob Hardy	Heather Zuhlke	August 12, 2018	1.41
46	8	"A Friend of the Family"	Hernán Otoño	Vladimir Cvetko & Safia M. Dirie	August 26, 2018	1.46
47	9	"There's a Snitch Among Us"	Gary Lennon	Gary Lennon	September 2, 2018	1.42
48	10	"When This Is Over"	M. J. Bassett	Courtney A. Kemp & Gabriela Uribe	September 9, 2018	1.53

=== Season 6 (2019–20) ===
No. overall	No. in season	Title	Directed by	Written by	Original release date	U.S. viewers (millions)
49	1	"Murderers"	David Rodriguez	Andre J. Ferguson and Courtney A. Kemp	August 25, 2019	1.47
50	2	"Whose Side Are You On"	Hernán Otoño	Monica Mitchell	September 1, 2019	1.07
51	3	"Forgot About Dre"	Curtis Jackson	Theo Travers	September 8, 2019	1.12
52	4	"Why Is Tommy Still Alive?"	Kieron Hawkes	Matt K. Turner	September 15, 2019	1.17
53	5	"King's Gambit"	Sanford Bookstaver	Gabriela Uribe	September 22, 2019	1.24
54	6	"Inside Man"	Shana Stein	Eric Haywood	September 29, 2019	1.24
55	7	"Like Father, Like Son"	Solvan Naim	Andre J. Ferugson	October 6, 2019	1.39
56	8	"Deal with the Devil"	Bart Wenrich	Monica Mitchell & Gabriela Uribe	October 13, 2019	1.26
57	9	"Scorched Earth"	Gary Lennon	Gary Lennon	October 27, 2019	1.22
58	10	"No One Can Stop Me"	Shana Stein	Courtney A. Kemp	November 3, 2019	1.17
59	11	"Still DRE"	Kieron Hawkes	Matt K. Turner	January 5, 2020	1.24
60	12	"He Always Wins"	Bart Wenrich	Monica Mitchell	January 12, 2020	1.05
61	13	"It's All Your Fault"	Hernán Otoño	Theo Travers	January 19, 2020	0.90
62	14	"Reversal of Fortune"	Mario Van Peebles	Eric Haywood	January 26, 2020	1.06
63	15	"Exactly How We Planned"	Anthony Hemingway	Courtney A. Kemp & Gabriela Uribe	February 9, 2020	1.19

== Ratings ==
Power : U.S. viewers per episode (millions)

Season	Episode number															Average
Season	1	2	3	4	5	6	7	8	9	10	11	12	13	14	15	Average
1	0.46	0.61	0.47	0.56	0.53	0.75	0.75	1.08	–							0.65
2	1.43	1.12	1.11	1.30	1.25	1.25	1.26	1.04	1.37	1.54	–					1.24
3	2.26	1.74	1.88	1.72	1.80	2.11	1.84	1.99	2.04	2.01	–					1.94
4	1.68	1.44	1.72	1.72	1.79	1.83	1.69	1.81	1.90	2.00	–					1.76
5	1.55	0.70	1.50	1.36	1.35	1.33	1.41	1.46	1.42	1.53	–					1.36
6	1.47	1.07	1.12	1.17	1.24	1.24	1.39	1.26	1.22	1.17	1.24	1.05	0.90	1.06	1.19	1.22

Audience measurement performed by Nielsen Media Research
