= Tommy Egan =

Fictional character from Power, Book II and Book IV

- Power character
- First appearance: "Not Exactly How We Planned" (Power); 2014
- Created by: Courtney A. Kemp
- Portrayed by: Joseph Sikora; Charlie Mann (young; Power: Origins)
- Date of birth: June 25, 1980
- Status: Alive
- Franchise: Power Universe

In-universe information
- Full name: Thomas Patrick Egan
- Nicknames: White boy; Em; T; Uncle Tommy; DJ Tommy-Toms
- Gender: Male
- Affiliation: Truth (formerly); Lobos Cartel (formerly); Italian Mafia (formerly); Serbian Mafia (formerly)
- Family: Kate Egan (mother); Tony Teresi (father; deceased); Miriam Egan (grandmother; deceased); JP (maternal half-brother; deceased); Darnell "D-Mac" McDowell (half-nephew)
- Significant others: Holly (ex-girlfriend; deceased); LaKeisha Grant (girlfriend; deceased); Gloria (ex-lover; deceased); Mireya Garcia (girlfriend)
- Nationality: American
- Occupation: Club owner (formerly); Drug lord
- Position: Co-owner of Truth (formerly); Distro
- Appeared on: Power (main role); Power Book II: Ghost (guest appearance); Power Book IV: Force (lead role); Power: Legacy (lead role)

Tommy Egan (né Thomas Patrick Teresi), portrayed by Joseph Sikora, is a fictional character from the Starz television series, Power and spin-offs, Book II, Book IV and Power: Origins. He is a convicted drug dealer from Jamaica, Queens and the only character to feature in all four shows (portrayed by Andrew Bennet in the series finale of the prequel, Book III) in the Power Universe.

== Storyline ==
=== Power ===
==== Season 1 ====
In New York City of 2014, Tommy Egan is first seen summoning his lifelong best friend and business partner, James “Ghost” St. Patrick, to kill a man Miguel and his wife for stealing from their drug operation. Tommy and Ghost are the New York City distributors for Felipe Lobos, an international drug cartel leader. They open the night club “Truth” to help launder their money- Ghost sees the club as an escape from the street life while Tommy embraces the lifestyle. Ghost has a devoted wife Tasha, who is in on the drug business, and three children- Tariq, Raina and Yasmine. Ghost starts cheating on Tasha with his high school sweetheart Angela Valdes, who is an Assistant United States Attorney with the Eastern District of New York. While she starts looking into the distributor of Lobos’ drug syndicate, Tommy and Ghost try and keep their organization under wraps after multiple outside attacks. Tommy begins seeing club employee Holly despite Ghost's concerns. She then goes on to steal a pair of Tasha's earrings which Tommy has to lie about, strengthening their bond. Shawn Stark, the son of an old imprisoned neighborhood mentor of Ghost and Tommy named Kanan, starts fooling around with Tasha behind Ghost's back. In addition, Valdes becomes close on multiple occasions, working with her ex-boyfriend/FBI agent Greg Knox, AUSA Cooper Saxe, and DEA agent Juan Medina. She begins collaborating with a CI, Nomar, a soldier in Ruiz's organization, one of Ghost and Tommy's captains. As Tommy begins to suspect it's Rolla, a young kid Ghost mentored from Queens, the audience starts to see Kanan Stark (50 Cent) in prison, talking to the assassin who has been taking out members of Ghost and Tommy's crew. Kanan states he wants Ghost dead before he is out of jail, revealing he is the true mastermind behind the attacks. Tasha asks Shawn to see what Angela looks like, realizing Ghost has never gotten over her since high school. In the season finale, Tommy is asked to do a favor by Ruiz- kill the man who has been sleeping with his 14-year-old daughter. That man is Nomar, Angela's CI. Unknowingly to Tommy, Angela and Greg are following Nomar. Tommy successfully stabs Nomar while he hears Angela call in the murder and identify herself. Nomar says “Ghost” stabbed him while Tommy narrowly escapes. Meanwhile, Ghost has a party at Truth while the assassin, a Latina woman with bright Pink shoes, tries to kill Ghost but accidentally shoots Holly.

=== Power Book II: Ghost ===
==== Season 1 ====
Tasha St. Patrick pinned the murder of James on Tommy to protect her son, thus making it a priority of the feds to arrest him.

Tasha went to see Monet Tejada (Mary J. Blige) at her bar to buy her son Tariq (Michael Rainey Jr.) out of the game completely, when they were busy discussing there was a shootout outside the bar, after the coast was clear, Tasha looked out the window and saw a blue Mustang which is Tommy's signature car. Tasha realized Tommy has returned and is after her for wrongfully framing him.

Later that night Tariq went to see Tommy to negotiate a peace treaty but Tommy was so fixated on killing Tasha for the murder of his late girlfriend, Lakeisha Grant (Lala Anthony), pinning the murder of Ghost (Omari Hardwick) on him, and for ratting on his organization and his whole operation to the feds. He has also cut ties with Tariq by stating they stopped being family when he killed Ghost.

Tommy stole his mother's BMW and followed Tasha with no knowledge that the federal agents led by Cooper Saxe (Shane Johnson) were watching his every move. After a lengthy chase, he supposedly drove into a gas station and his car exploded.

Tariq received a phone call and it was revealed that Tommy Egan was not dead but very much alive, him and Tariq orchestrated the fabrication of his death so he can hide from the law enforcement. When Tariq went to meet up with his mother in the graveyard, he already dropped a tip to the police that someone was closing in on Tasha, so the police took Tasha into witness protection where Tommy could not find her, after the police left, Tommy came out and began to strangle Tariq but Monet came in to get the drop on him as she had Tommy at gun point but she let him go, after Tariq states he doesn't want him dead.

=== Power Book IV: Force ===
==== Season 1 ====
With New York thinking him dead, Tommy heads for California, where an associate is waiting. However, he heads to Chicago for a pit stop and discovers his grandmother is still alive and that he has an older half-brother named JP. After a series of events occur, Tommy takes a liking to the city of Chicago and tells his associate to find someone else because he has decided to make Chicago his new base of operations.

Tommy bumped into an old employee Liliana (Audrey Esparza) who believed he was there to kill her but after a fight, they realize it was coincidence that brought them together. He then recruits her to working for him, once discovering that she has been dealing in the city.

He later recruits a young gangster named D-Mac, only to later learn that he is his nephew from JP.

== Appearances ==
Power Universe
Year	Title	Notes	Ref.
2014–2020	Power	main role	
2021, 2023	Power Book II: Ghost	3 episodes	
2022–2026	Power Book IV: Force	Lead role	
