= Mekai Curtis =

American actor

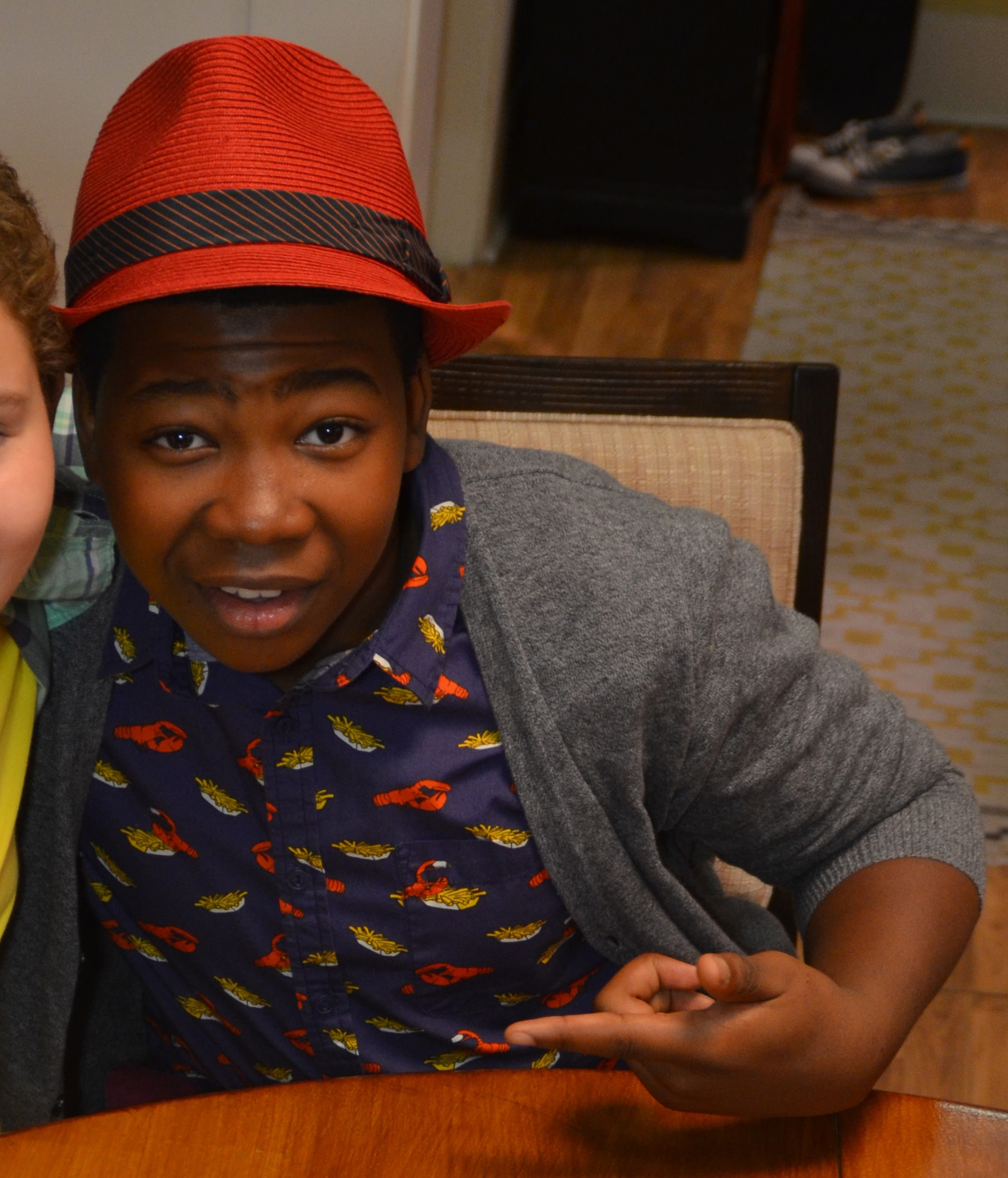
- Curtis on set in 2014 for Kirby Buckets
- Born: October 14, 2000 (age 26); Neptune City, New Jersey, U.S.
- Occupation: Actor
- Years active: 2013–present

Mekai Curtis (born October 14, 2000) is an American actor. He is best known for playing the lead role of Kanan Stark in the drama series Power Book III: Raising Kanan, Fish Fisher in the Disney XD series Kirby Buckets and for voicing Zack in the Disney XD animated series Milo Murphy’s Law.

== Early life ==
Curtis was born in Neptune City, New Jersey. He lived there until he reached third grade. He lived in various parts of Ocean County, New Jersey before moving to Los Angeles at age 12.

== Career ==
Curtis made a one off appearance in the Disney sitcom Girl Meets World. His first big role came playing Kirby's best friend Fish in the comedy series Kirby Buckets. He starred alongside Weird Al Yankovic and Sabrina Carpenter in the animated series Milo Murphy's Law. From 2021 to 2026, he had portrayed the lead role of Kanan Stark in the Starz drama series Power Book III: Raising Kanan.

== Personal life ==
In his spare time, Curtis enjoys cooking, playing video games and driving cars. He is also a musician who plays the drums and the piano.

== Filmography ==
=== Film ===
Year	Title	Role	Notes
2013	Bug	Brick	Short
2014	Alexander and the Terrible, Horrible, No Good, Very Bad Day	Paul Dumphy	

=== Television ===
Year	Title	Role	Notes
2013	Arrested Development	Irving	Episode: "Off The Hook"
2014	Girl Meets World	Felix Shumpert	Episode: "Girl Meets Popular"
2014–2017	Kirby Buckets	Fish Fisher	Main role 59 episodes
2016–2019	Milo Murphy's Law	Zack Underwood	Main role; 40 episodes
2017	The Lion Guard	Fuhara	Episode: "Rafiki's New Neighbors"
2018	Overnights	Cooper	5 episodes
2018	Chicken Girls	Cooper	2 episodes
2018	Baby Doll Records	Cooper	2 episodes
2021–2026	Power Book III: Raising Kanan	Kanan Stark	Lead role; 48 episodes
2027	Power: Origins	Kanan Stark	Lead role
