= Five Points (TV series) =

- Genre: Teen drama
- Created by: Adam Giaudrone
- Written by: Adam Giaudrone
- Directed by: Thomas Carter
- Starring: Hayley Kiyoko; Madison Pettis; Kenton George; Ray Cham Jr.; Spence Moore II; Nathaniel Potvin; Jake Austin Walker; Trey Curtis; Daniela Nieves
- Composer: Emmit Fenn
- Country of origin: United States
- Original language: English
- No. of seasons: 2
- No. of episodes: 20

Production
- Executive producers: Jon Avnet; Rodrigo García; Jake Avnet; Kerry Washington; Adam Giaudrone; Thomas Carter
- Producers: Sage Scroope; Pilar Savone; Ben Fast
- Cinematography: Peter Holland
- Editor: Neil Mandelberg
- Camera setup: Single-camera
- Running time: 9–17 minutes
- Production companies: Indigenous Media; Simpson Street

Original release
- Network: Facebook Watch
- Release: June 4, 2018 – September 2, 2019

Five Points is an American teen drama web series that premiered on June 4, 2018, on Facebook Watch. The series was created and written by Adam Giaudrone and directed by Thomas Carter, both of whom also executive produce alongside Kerry Washington, Jon Avnet, Rodrigo García, and Jake Avnet. On December 13, 2018, it was announced that the series had been renewed for a second season. The second season premiered on August 5, 2019.

== Premise ==
Five Points follows "five students at a South Side, Chicago high school who experience a life-changing event from different points of view, with each perspective being necessary to help understand the truth."

== Cast and characters ==
=== Main ===
- Hayley Kiyoko as Lexi Himitsu
- Madison Pettis as Natasha "Tosh" Bennett
- Kenton George as Stephen Elliott
- Ray Cham Jr. as Cameron "CJ" Jin
- Spence Moore II as Eric Harper (season 1)
- Nathaniel Potvin as Wallace Marks
- Jake Austin Walker as Alex Baker
- Trey Curtis as Jonathan
- Daniela Nieves as Ananda (season 2)

=== Recurring ===
- Coco Jones as Jayla
- Bryan Petty as Jock
- Jahking Guillory as Ronnie Martin
- Moe Irvin as Frank Bennett
- Noah Weisberg as Mr. Delph
- Milt Kogan as Mr. Saroyan
- Hilary Ward as Detective Waters
- Michael Broderick as Detective Shaw
- James Black as Coach Magee
- Matthew Hancock as Mr. Saunders
- Kelly Sullivan as Victoria "Vickie" Bennett
- Jordyn James as Mimi

=== Guest ===
- Ani Sava as Mrs. Luisine ("And Yet Here We Are")
- Matt Gottlieb as Gino ("And Yet Here We Are")
- Jully Lee as Miss Kincaid ("Maybe I Like Eyeliner")
- Troy Winbush as Paul Harper ("Top Of The Food Chain")
- Jason Isaacs as Kenneth Himitsu ("We Started This")
- Felice Heather Monteith as Barbara Baker ("Not Afraid Of Anything")

== Episodes ==
=== Series overview ===
Season	Episodes	Originally released	
Season	Episodes	First released	Last released
1	10	June 4, 2018	July 9, 2018
2	10	August 5, 2019	September 2, 2019

=== Season 1 (2018) ===
No. overall	No. in season	Title	Featured character	Directed by	Written by	Original release date
1	1	"And Yet Here We Are"	CJ	Thomas Carter	Adam Giaudrone	June 4, 2018
2	2	"Everybody Knows"	Tosh Stephen Eric	Thomas Carter	Adam Giaudrone	June 4, 2018
3	3	"Too Soon To Tell"	Stephen Wallace	Thomas Carter	Adam Giaudrone	June 4, 2018
4	4	"Maybe I Like Eyeliner"	Lexi	Thomas Carter	Adam Giaudrone	June 11, 2018
5	5	"Top Of The Food Chain"	Eric	Thomas Carter	Adam Giaudrone	June 18, 2018
6	6	"You Were My Friend"	Tosh	Thomas Carter	Adam Giaudrone	June 25, 2018
7	7	"We Started This"	CJ	Thomas Carter	Adam Giaudrone	July 2, 2018
8	8	"I Saw The Tape"	Wallace	Thomas Carter	Adam Giaudrone	July 2, 2018
9	9	"That Can't Be Good"	Lexi	Thomas Carter	Adam Giaudrone	July 9, 2018
10	10	"Not Afraid Of Anything"	Alex	Thomas Carter	Adam Giaudrone	July 9, 2018

=== Season 2 (2019) ===
No. overall	No. in season	Title	Featured character	Directed by	Written by	Original release date
11	1	"Am I A Suspect?"	CJ	Thomas Carter, Mercedes Bryce Morgan	Sonja Perryman	August 5, 2019
12	2	"Who Threatened You?"	Lexi	Thomas Carter, Mercedes Bryce Morgan	Katie Elmore Mota	August 5, 2019
13	3	"You Don't Know The Whole Story"	Ananda	Thomas Carter, Mercedes Bryce Morgan	Brandon Zuck	August 5, 2019
14	4	"I'm Not Psycho"	Tosh Stephen	Thomas Carter	Sonja Perryman	August 12, 2019
15	5	"No One Else Has to Know"	Stephen Wallace	Thomas Carter	Brandon Zuck	August 12, 2019
16	6	"Not a Normal Couple"	Ananda	Thomas Carter	Brandon Zuck	August 19, 2019
17	7	"A Crime Against Humanity"	Tosh Stephen	Thomas Carter	Sonja Perryman	August 19, 2019
18	8	"You Actually Believe That?"	CJ	Thomas Carter	Sonja Perryman	August 26, 2019
19	9	"It's Not What You Think"	Lexi	Thomas Carter	Brandon Zuck	August 26, 2019
20	10	"This Ends With Me"	Ananda	Thomas Carter	Katie Elmore Mota	September 2, 2019

== Production ==
=== Development ===
On October 17, 2017, Facebook announced that it had given the production a series order for a first season consisting of ten episodes. The series was created by Adam Giaudrone who is set to executive produce alongside Jon Avnet, Rodrigo García, Jake Avnet, Kerry Washington, Pilar Savone, and Thomas Carter. Giaudrone is also expected to act as a writer for the series as Carter is as a director. Production companies involved with the series include Simpson Street and Indigenous Media.

On January 9, 2018, Washington discussed the series at the annual Consumer Electronics Show in Las Vegas saying, "What I'm thrilled about is not only the content itself — the story, the acting, how its a shot." She continued, "There are some really important coming-of-age issues that we deal with. It's the LGBT community. It's gun violence. Drug use. Bullying." On May 16, 2018, it was announced that the series would premiere on June 4, 2018. On December 13, 2018, it was announced that the series had been renewed for a second season.

=== Casting ===
Alongside the series order announcement, it was confirmed that Madison Pettis and Hayley Kiyoko had been cast in the series' lead female roles. A month later, it was reported that Kenton George, Ray Cham Jr., Trey Curtis, Nathaniel Potvin, Jake Walker, and Spence Moore II had been added to the main cast.

=== Marketing ===
On January 30, 2018, Facebook released the first promotional video for the series. On May 16, 2018, the first official trailer for the series was released.

== Reception ==
=== Critical response ===
In an overall positive review, Decider's Joel Keller recommended audiences stream the series saying, "Stream It, because the performances are good, the characters are well-drawn given the time constraints and the time commitment isn't that big. But don't expect a satisfying teen drama."

=== Viewership ===
In its first eight days of release, the first episode of the series garnered over two million views. However, from episode one to episode three, viewership reportedly went down by more than 80%, dropping to 190,000 views.
