= Crookhaven (TV series) =

2026 British television series

- Genre: Drama
- Created by: Justin Young
- Based on: Crookhaven the School for Thieves by J. J. Arcanjo
- Written by: Justin Young
- Directed by: Jon East; Jamie Magnus Stone
- Starring: Lucas Leach; Carmel Laniado; Dougray Scott; Amari Bacchus; Sani Thabo; Aerona Shi; Leila Khan; Charlie Mann
- Composer: Katie Richardson
- Country of origin: United Kingdom
- Original language: English
- No. of series: 1
- No. of episodes: 8

Production
- Executive producers: Mark Freeland; Justin Young; Amy Buscombe
- Producer: Leon McGeown-Fee
- Running time: 43–45 minutes
- Production company: BBC Studios Kids & Family

Original release
- Network: BBC One
- Release: 22 March 2026 – present

Crookhaven is a British television drama series based on J. J. Arcanjo's book series of the same name. Set in a secret school for aspiring crooks, the show follows the adventures of young pickpocket Gabriel Avery. The series premiered on 22 March 2026 on BBC One, CBBC and BBC iPlayer. In July 2026, the BBC commissioned a second series.

== Synopsis ==
Gabriel Avery, a young pickpocket, is recruited to study at the Crookhaven School, which aims to train their students in crooked skills but guide them to use their skills for good. He finds himself among eight new recruits at the school, one of whom is his arch-rival Penelope, the daughter of the headmaster, Caspian Lockett. The new recruits compete to be the best of the year and win the coveted Crooked Cup. However, nothing is as it appears in the school, and along the way Gabriel discovers something surprising about himself and has to confront a dangerous enemy called The Nameless, who poses a threat to the school.

== Cast and characters ==
=== Main ===
- Lucas Leach as Gabriel Avery
- Carmel Laniado as Penelope Lockett
- Dougray Scott as Caspian Lockett
- Amari Bacchus as Ade Okoro
- Sani Thabo as Ede Okoro
- Aerona Shi as Jia Ou
- Leila Khan as Amira Dhawan
- Charlie Mann as Edgar Delacombe

=== Supporting ===
- Rowan McIntosh as Dorian McArthur
- Tipper Seifert-Cleveland as Nicki
- Anna-Sophia Eden as Isabella
- Alex Mugnaioni as Diego Velasquez
- Keith Allen as Erasmus Sisman
- Keith Singleton as Mickey
- Julie Hesmondhalgh as Grandma Sue
- Claire Forlani as Carmen
- Ti Barbosa as Leon
- Genesis Lynea as Whisper
- Imran Yusuf as Mister Khan
- Miltos Yerolemou as Mister Palumbo
- Naomi Wirthner as Matilda Jericho
- Celinde Schoenmaker as Miss Friedrich
- Emily Maitlis (voice) as Miss Clarke
- Tobias Jowett as Ishaan
- Arthur Darvill as The Leopard
- Edwin Flay as Mr. Mercier

== Production ==
Crookhaven was commissioned by Sarah Muller, Senior Head of Commissioning 7+, BBC Children's and Education, and created by Justin Young who adapted for television the book series of the same name by J. J. Arcanjo. Crookhaven was produced by BBC Studios Kids & Family for the BBC with support from Northern Ireland Screen.

The series was filmed mostly around County Down and Belfast in Northern Ireland, with additional scenes shot in London. The Clandeboye Estate in County Down served as the Crookhaven School, with the Helen's Tower in its ground the scene of challenges. Filming started in May and continued into the summer of 2025.

The BBC commissioned a second series in July 2026.

== Episodes ==
No. overall	No. in series	Episode	Directed by	Written by	Original release date (Note: All episodes were released on iPlayer on 22 March 2026 but released two a week on BBC One and CBBC.)
1	1	"Word to the Wise"	Jon East	Justin Young	22 March 2026
2	2	"The Break-In"	Jon East	Justin Young	22 March 2026
3	3	"Full Disclosure"	Jon East	Justin Young	29 March 2026
4	4	"The Crooked Network"	Jon East	Justin Young	29 March 2026
5	5	"The Shilling Test"	Jamie Magnus Stone	Lou Ramsden	5 April 2026
6	6	"Crooxeat"	Jamie Magnus Stone	Sumerah Srivastav	5 April 2026
7	7	"The Trials"	Jamie Magnus Stone	Justin Young	12 April 2026
8	8	"Masquerade"	Jamie Magnus Stone	Justin Young	12 April 2026

== Broadcast ==
The first series premiered on 22 March 2026.
