= Power Universe =

American crime drama franchise

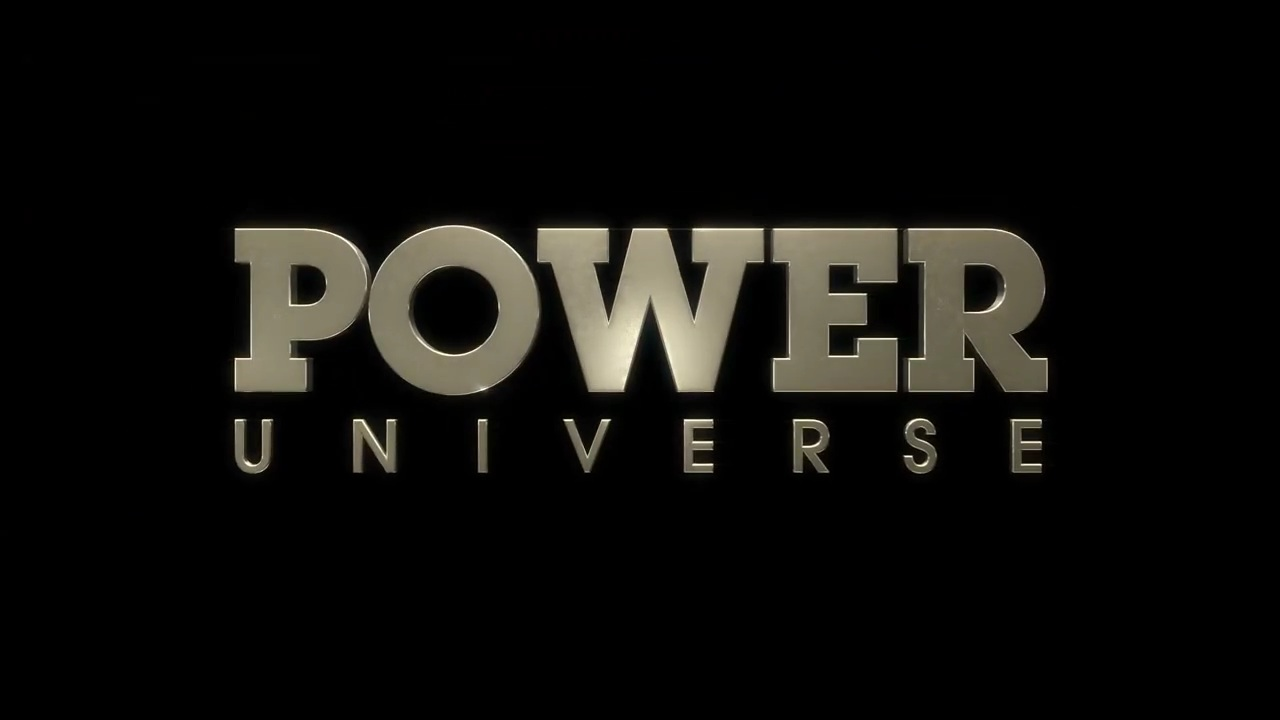
- Other name: Power franchise
- Created by: Courtney A. Kemp; 50 Cent
- Original work: Power
- Owners: Starz; CBS Studios; Lionsgate Studios
- Years: 2014–present

Films and television
- Television series: Power (2014–2020); Power Book II: Ghost (2020–2024); Power Book III: Raising Kanan (2021–2026); Power Book IV: Force (2022–2026); Power: Origins (TBA); Power: Legacy (TBA); Power Book V: Influence (Scrapped)

Audio
- Soundtrack(s): Soundtracks
- Original music: "Big Rich Town" by 50 Cent & Joe

Miscellaneous
- Executive producer: 50 Cent; Courtney A. Kemp
- Distributor: Starz Distribution

Official website
- Official website

The Power Universe (or Power franchise) is an American media franchise of television crime drama series created by Courtney A. Kemp in collaboration with Curtis "50 Cent" Jackson. The franchise produced one of the highest-rated and most-watched shows on Starz.

== Television series ==
Four television series make up the Power franchise: Power, Book II: Ghost, Book III: Raising Kanan, and Book IV: Force. All series in total amount to 181 episodes across 18 seasons of television.

Series	Season	Episodes	Originally released		Showrunner(s)	Status
Series	Season	Episodes	First released	Last released	Showrunner(s)	Status
Power	1	8	June 7, 2014	August 2, 2014	Courtney A. Kemp	Concluded
Power	2	10	June 6, 2015	August 15, 2015	Courtney A. Kemp	Concluded
Power	3	10	July 17, 2016	September 25, 2016	Courtney A. Kemp	Concluded
Power	4	10	June 25, 2017	September 3, 2017	Courtney A. Kemp	Concluded
Power	5	10	July 1, 2018	September 9, 2018	Courtney A. Kemp	Concluded
Power	6	15	August 25, 2019	February 9, 2020	Courtney A. Kemp	Concluded
Power Book II: Ghost	1	10	September 6, 2020	January 3, 2021	Courtney A. Kemp	Concluded
Power Book II: Ghost	2	10	November 21, 2021	February 6, 2022	Courtney A. Kemp	Concluded
Power Book II: Ghost	3	10	March 17, 2023	May 26, 2023	Brett Mahoney	Concluded
Power Book II: Ghost	4	10	June 7, 2024	October 4, 2024	Brett Mahoney	Concluded
Power Book III: Raising Kanan	1	10	July 18, 2021	September 26, 2021	Sascha Penn	Concluded
Power Book III: Raising Kanan	2	10	August 14, 2022	October 23, 2022	Sascha Penn	Concluded
Power Book III: Raising Kanan	3	10	December 1, 2023	February 9, 2024	Sascha Penn	Concluded
Power Book III: Raising Kanan	4	10	March 7, 2025	May 16, 2025	Sascha Penn	Concluded
Power Book III: Raising Kanan	5	8	June 12, 2026	August 7, 2026	Sascha Penn	Concluded
Power Book IV: Force	1	10	February 6, 2022	April 17, 2022	Robert Munic	Concluded
Power Book IV: Force	2	10	September 1, 2023	November 10, 2023	Gary Lennon	Concluded
Power Book IV: Force	3	10	November 7, 2025	January 16, 2026	Gary Lennon	Concluded
Power: Origins	1	18	TBA	TBA	Sascha Penn	Filming
Power: Legacy	1	8	TBA	TBA	Gary Lennon	Series order

=== Power (2014–2020) ===
James St. Patrick finds himself in trouble when he is caught between balancing two separate lives. Trying to leave his past as a smooth yet ruthless drug-dealer nicknamed "Ghost," his new goals to be a legitimate nightclub owner and to save his crumbling marriage don't come easy. As the "ghost" of his past comes to roost, James must evade the police, manage shifting economic alliances, and attempt to leave the criminal world behind.

=== Power Book II: Ghost (2020–2024) ===
Serving as a sequel to the original series, Power Book II: Ghost follows Tariq St. Patrick as he navigates a new life. With a desire to shed his father's legacy, he too finds himself entangled in the complications of drug operations and family affairs. With mounting pressure to save his family, he must learn to balance his drug operation, take on the cutthroat Tejada family, and avoid scrutiny from local and federal law enforcement.

=== Power Book III: Raising Kanan (2021–2026) ===
In a prequel to the original series, Power Book III: Raising Kanan follows the journey of young Kanan Stark as he first gets into the drug-dealing game in the 1990s to his role as a major antagonist in Power.

=== Power Book IV: Force (2022–2026) ===
In the second sequel spin-off to Power, Power Book IV: Force follows Tommy Egan as he leaves New York behind to try to become the greatest drug-dealer in all of Chicago.

=== Power: Origins (TBA) ===
A fifth series and fourth spin-off in the Power Universe was announced to be in development at Starz on March 13, 2024. The series, which is the second prequel in the franchise as well as a sequel to Power Book III: Raising Kanan, will focus on the early years of James "Ghost" St. Patrick and Tommy Egan in the late 1990s and early 2000s, exploring their rise in New York City's criminal underworld. Starz ordered an 18-episode season in July 2025 with MeKai Curtis reprising Kanan Stark and Raising Kanan creator Sascha Penn creating and showrunning Origins as well.

=== Power: Legacy (TBA) ===
The development of Power: Legacy was announced in June 2025, with Gary Lennon and Kendra Chapman writing, producing and Lennon set as showrunner, and the series centered around Tommy Egan and Tariq St. Patrick. Starz ordered an 8-episode season in June 2026 with Joseph Sikora and Michael Rainey Jr. reprising Tommy Egan and Tariq St. Patrick and Force creator Gary Lennon creating and showrunning Legacy as well. This will be the fifth spin-off and third sequel to Power.

=== Cancelled or reworked projects ===
==== Power Book V: Influence ====
The development of Power Book V: Influence was cancelled in August 2022 and the series would not be moving forward. Power Book V: Influence was set to follow Rashad Tate's political career. The spin-off was supposed to focus on Tate’s second run for governor of New York, with Larenz Tate reprising his role. However, Starz decided not to move forward with this project, likely because Tate’s character already plays a prominent role in Power Book II: Ghost. Starz programming executives have mentioned that the character's story could continue to unfold within that series.

== Accolades ==
Series	Year	Award	Category	Nominee(s)	Result	Ref.
Power	2015	Women's Image Network Awards	Actress Drama Series	Naturi Naughton	Nominated	
Power	2015	Women's Image Network Awards	Outstanding Show Written by a Woman	Courtney A. Kemp	Nominated	
Power	2016	47th NAACP Image Awards	Outstanding Drama Series	Power	Nominated	
Power	2016	47th NAACP Image Awards	Outstanding Actor in a Drama Series	Omari Hardwick	Nominated	
Power	2016	47th NAACP Image Awards	Outstanding Supporting Actress in a Drama Series	Naturi Naughton	Nominated	
Power	2016	NAMIC Vision Awards	Best Performance – Drama	Naturi Naughton	Nominated	
Power	2016	NAMIC Vision Awards	Best Performance – Drama	Omari Hardwick	Won	
Power	2016	Women's Image Network Awards	Actress Drama Series	Naturi Naughton	Nominated	
Power	2017	48th NAACP Image Awards	Outstanding Drama Series	Power	Nominated	
Power	2017	48th NAACP Image Awards	Outstanding Actor in a Drama Series	Omari Hardwick	Nominated	
Power	2017	48th NAACP Image Awards	Outstanding Supporting Actress in a Drama Series	Naturi Naughton	Won	
Power	2017	Black Reel Awards for Television	Outstanding Drama Series	Power	Nominated	
Power	2017	People's Choice Awards	Favorite Premium Drama Series	Power	Nominated	
Power	2018	49th NAACP Image Awards	Outstanding Drama Series	Power	Won	
Power	2018	49th NAACP Image Awards	Outstanding Actor in a Drama Series	Omari Hardwick	Won	
Power	2018	49th NAACP Image Awards	Outstanding Supporting Actress in a Drama Series	Naturi Naughton	Won	
Power	2018	49th NAACP Image Awards	Outstanding Performance by a Youth (Series, Special, Television Movie or Limited Series)	Michael Rainey Jr.	Nominated	
Power	2018	Black Reel Awards for Television	Outstanding Actor, Drama Series	Omari Hardwick	Nominated	
Power	2018	NAMIC Vision Awards	Best Performance – Drama	50 Cent	Nominated	
Power	2018	NAMIC Vision Awards	Best Performance – Drama	Michael Rainey Jr.	Nominated	
Power	2018	NAMIC Vision Awards	Drama	Power	Nominated	
Power	2018	Hollywood Music in Media Awards (HMMA)	Outstanding Music Supervision – Television	Jennifer Ross	Won	
Power	2019	50th NAACP Image Awards	Outstanding Drama Series	Power	Won	
Power	2019	34th Annual Imagen Awards	Best Actress - Television	Lela Loren	Nominated	
Power	2020	51st NAACP Image Awards	Outstanding Actor in a Drama Series	Omari Hardwick	Won	
Power Book II: Ghost	2021	NAACP Image Awards	Outstanding Drama Series	Power Book II: Ghost	Won	
Power Book II: Ghost	2021	NAACP Image Awards	Outstanding Supporting Actor in a Drama Series	Clifford 'Method Man' Smith Jr	Won	
Power Book II: Ghost	2021	NAACP Image Awards	Outstanding Supporting Actress in a Drama Series	Mary J. Blige	Won	
Power Book II: Ghost	2022	NAACP Image Awards	Outstanding Supporting Actor in a Drama Series	Clifford 'Method Man' Smith Jr	Won	
Power Book II: Ghost	2022	NAACP Image Awards	Outstanding Supporting Actress in a Drama Series	Mary J. Blige	Won	

== Theme songs ==
The opening themes for all four series are songs performed by the executive producer of the show, 50 Cent.

Series	Theme song
Power	"Big Rich Town"
Power Book II: Ghost	"Big Rich Town"
Power Book III: Raising Kanan	"Part of the Game"
Power Book IV: Force	"Power Powder Respect"
