= Charlie Mann (actor) =

British actor (born 2001)

- Born: Charles Robert Caspar Mann; 5 July 2001 (age 25); Bedford, England
- Education: London College of Music
- Years active: 2018–present

Charles Robert Caspar Mann (born 2001) is an English actor. On television, he is known for his role in the BBC series Crookhaven (2026–). His films include Primate (2025).

== Early life ==
Mann is from Bedford. He pursued a BTEC at Bedford College from 2017 to 2019. He graduated with a Bachelor of Arts (BA) in Acting from the London College of Music in 2022.

== Career ==
Mann made his feature film debut as Archie in the 2018 World War II action horror Aux with John Rhys-Davies. He returned to film in the 2024 horror film The Watchers as Romeo.

In 2025, Mann made his television debut with a recurring role as Paul King in the BBC One crime thriller Virdee. Later in the year, he played Drew in the horror film Primate and young Billy McIntyre (Lex Shrapnel) in the Amazon Prime horror miniseries Lazarus. He also appeared in the films Momo and High Wire.

The following year, Mann had his first main television role as Edgar Delacombe in the BBC teen series Crookhaven, an adaptation of the JJ Arcanjo book series. Mann is set to star as Tommy Egan in the Starz series Power: Origins.

== Filmography ==
=== Film ===
| Year | Title | Role | Notes |
|---|---|---|---|
| 2018 | Aux | Archie | |
| 2022 | Will | Charles | Short film |
| 2024 | The Watchers | Romeo | |
| 2025 | Primate | Drew | |
| 2025 | Momo | Jack | |
| 2025 | High Wire | Keith | |

=== Television ===
| Year | Title | Role | Notes |
|---|---|---|---|
| 2025 | Virdee | Paul King | 3 episodes |
| 2025 | Lazarus | Young Billy McIntyre | 5 episodes |
| 2026–present | Crookhaven | Edgar Delacombe | Main role |
| TBA | Power: Origins | Tommy Egan | |
