= Lela Loren =

American actress (born 1980)

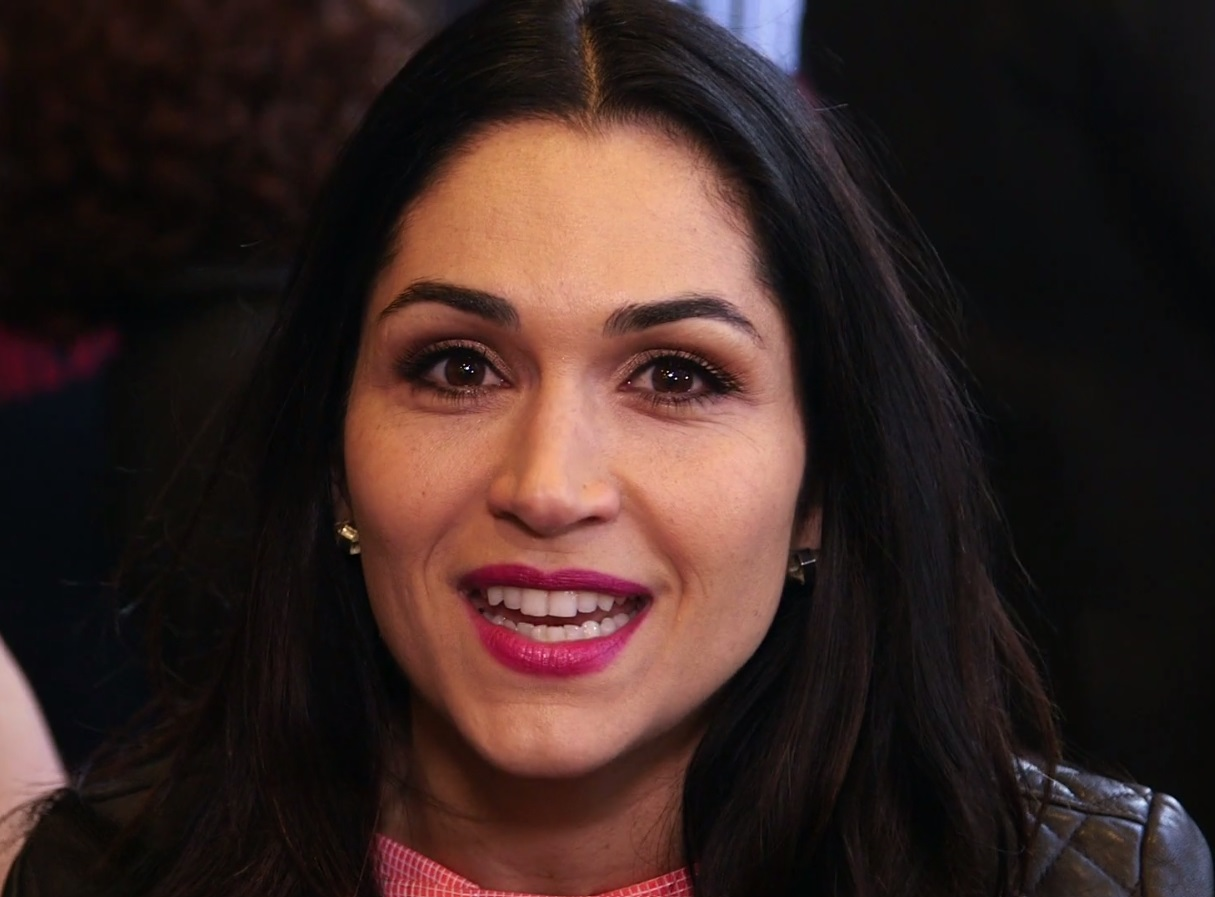
- Lela Loren at the opening night of Broadway's "Eclipsed" in 2016
- Born: Maria Loren Avellaneda Sharp; 7 May 1980 (age 46); Sacramento, California, U.S.
- Occupation: Actress
- Years active: 2006–present
- Known for: Portraying Angela Valdes on Power

Lela Loren (born 7 May 1980) is an American television and film actress. Known for her leading role as Angela Valdes on the Starz television series, Power, Loren notes in her interview that it took time to land her first audition, and that her early roles were in The Shield, Gang Related, and shows of the CSI franchise. Further television roles followed, including in Cold Case, and Ghost Whisperer, and she went on to film roles, including in The Hangover Part III and Reign Over Me.

In 2019, Loren joined the second season of the Netflix science fiction series, Altered Carbon as a series regular, playing the character of Danica Harlan.

== Early life and education ==
Loren was born Maria Loren Avellaneda Sharp on May 7, 1980, in Sacramento, California. She has one sibling, an older brother, Daniel Sharp, who is the executive chef at a small restaurant in New York City. Her mother is of Mexican descent, received her college degree in her 40s, and became a teacher; her father, an American, was working as an economist at the time he married her mother. She spent her childhood in Sacramento, California, and later, in suburban Sacramento, although spending summers in an area of her mother's heritage, in Mexico. Loren has stated that, despite her mom being from Michoacán, Mexico, she did not learn Spanish until she was 10 years old, and that doing so helped her to communicate with relatives when she would return to the village from which her mother came. From early childhood, Loren had surrounded herself with an array of pets, and had intended a career in biology. Loren went to an all-girls' high school, where she was a member of a men's rowing team.

Loren attended Whitman College in Walla Walla, Washington, where she majored in biology. She "begrudgingly fell in love" with acting after enrolling in a fine arts course "to get it out of the way", only to find herself moved to an entry level acting class when the arts class was full. It is reported that she did work on a commercial fishing boat in Alaska as a means to pay her college expenses. She graduated with a B.A. in theatre, in 2002. She also studied performing arts at the Ruskin School of Acting. From her upbringing and studies, Loren is fluent in English, Spanish, and Italian.

== Career ==
=== Television work ===
Loren notes that it took three years for her to land her first acting audition, and that she "paid her dues with small roles"—in The Shield, Gang Related, and shows of the CSI franchise. Further television roles followed, including in Cold Case and Ghost Whisperer. Loren began a leading role as Angela Valdes on the Starz television series, Power from 2014–2019, starring in 63 episodes.

In 2019, Loren joined the second season of the Netflix science fiction series, Altered Carbon, as a series regular, playing the character of Danica Harlan.

in 2021, Loren joined the third season of STARZ's series American Gods as Marguerite Olsen, a reporter for the local paper, a committed single mother of two, and a property manager.

=== Film work ===
Loren has had various film roles, including in The Hangover Part III in 2013 and Reign Over Me in 2007. Most recently she starred in The Man from Toronto in 2022, Awareness in 2023 and Knox Goes Away in 2023.

=== Stage work ===
In 2009, Loren played the lead role, Flora, at the American Conservatory Theater in José Rivera's Boleros for the Disenchanted. She also starred as Antonia in a stage production of My Antonia at Pacific Resident Theatre.

== Filmography ==
=== Film ===
Year	Title	Role	Notes
2006	Between the Lines	Yola	
2007	Reign Over Me	Dental Hygienist	
2008	Flotsam	Salazar	Short
2011	The Reunion	Theresa Trujillo	
2013	Snitch	Vanessaa	
2013	Stalkers	Jane Cox	TV movie
2013	The Hangover Part III	Female Officer	
2020	Bruised	Mrs. Bradshaw	
2022	The Man from Toronto	Daniela Marin	
2023	Awareness	Adriana	
2023	Knox Goes Away	Cheryl Knox	

=== Television ===
Year	Title	Role	Notes
2006	Cold Case	Ana Castilla	Episode: "Sanctuary"
2006	CSI: Miami	Isabella Mansera	Episode: "Shock"
2006	CSI: NY	Jo O'Keffe	Episode: "Sweet 16"
2007	The Shield	Nydia Hernandez	Recurring Cast: Season 6
2007	Ghost Whisperer	Anna Sanchez	Episode: "Haunted Hero"
2008	The Unit	Carina	Episode: "Sudden Flight"
2009	NCIS	Agent Isabella 'Izzie' Cortez	Episode: "Outlaws and In-Laws'
2010	Chuck	Elia	Episode: "Chuck Versus the Honeymooners"
2010	Lost	Claudia	Episode: "Across the Sea"
2011	The Mentalist	Nilda	Episode: "Bloodhounds"
2011	The Closer	Maria Flores	Episode: "Death Warrant"
2012	Covert Affairs	Blanca Gonzalez	Episode: "Loving the Alien"
2012–13	H+: The Digital Series	Francesca Rossi	Recurring Cast
2014	Gang Related	Silvia	Recurring Cast
2014–19	Power	Angela Valdes	Main Cast: Season 1–5, Guest: Season 6
2018	Bull	Katherine George	Episode: "Justice for Cable"
2020	Altered Carbon	Danica Harlan	Main Cast: Season 2
2021	American Gods	Marguerite Olsen	Recurring Cast: Season 3

== Personal life ==
Loren also writes poems, which is part of her process of getting into character.
