= Bart Wenrich =

American television producer

- Occupation(s): Television producer, television director, unit production manager
- Years active: 1987–present

Bart Wenrich is an American television producer, director and unit production manager based in New York City.

Since the late 1980s, Wenrich has served as a location manager on a number of films set in New York City. Some of those films include, Swimming to Cambodia (1987), Rooftops (1989), A Shock to the System (1990), A Rage in Harlem (1991) and Malcolm X (1992).

In 1994, he became a location manager for the television series New York Undercover, he was then promoted to unit production manager until the series ended in 1998. His other television credits as a unit production manager include The Sopranos, Hack, Jonny Zero, Love Monkey and Gossip Girl. He also worked as a producer on the last four aforementioned series.

In 2009, Wenrich made his directorial debut with the Gossip Girl webisode spin-off series Chasing Dorota. He went on to direct three Gossip Girl episodes: "It-Girl Happened One Night", "Raiders of the Lost Art" and "Dirty Rotten Scandals" in 2011 and 2012.

Wenrich resides in New York with his wife Dr. Bonnie Simmons and is currently an executive producer of the Starz series Power. He also directed three episodes of the series.
