= Gary Lennon =

American Screenwriter

- Occupations: Playwright, Television writer, producer, director, showrunner
- Years active: 1991–present

Gary Lennon is an American playwright, television writer and executive producer. Lennon is currently the showrunner of Power Book IV: Force on Starz, and he is credited with elevating the series to critical acclaim after he stepped into the role in its second season. Lennon is also reported to be working on expanding the Power Universe to additional spin-offs in his overall development deal with Lionsgate Television. Lennon was previously the co-showrunner of Power and Hightown, both for Starz and Lionsgate. He is also an executive producer on Euphoria for HBO. In 2013, Lennon won a Peabody Award for the first season of Orange Is the New Black along with his fellow writers and producers.

== Early life ==
Lennon grew up in Hell's Kitchen. He was orphaned by age 11, he dropped out of high school, and he did not attend college.

== Career ==
Lennon began his career as an aspiring actor. He studied under Geraldine Page, who encouraged him to write about his own life. Lennon compiled his monologues to create his first play, Blackout. After being rejected by the Circle Repertory Company as a young playwright, Lennon left one of his plays backstage at a theater attended by Marshall W. Mason, the founder of the company. Mason read the play that Lennon had addressed to him and set him up on his first meetings.

== Awards and nominations ==
Year	Award	Category	Work	Result
2011	Peabody Awards	Peabody Award	Justified	Won
2011	WGA Awards	WGA Award	Justified	Won
2011	Critics' Choice Awards	Television Award	Justified	Nominated
2011	AFI Awards	AFI Award Honoree for Television Program of the Year	Justified	Won
2013	WGA Awards	WGA Award	Orange Is the New Black	Nominated
2014	Emmy Awards	Outstanding Comedy Series	Orange Is the New Black	Nominated
2014	Peabody Awards	Peabody Award	Orange Is the New Black	Won
2015	PGA Awards	Danny Thomas Award for Outstanding Producer of Episodic Television - Comedy	Orange Is the New Black	Won
2018	NAACP Image Awards	Outstanding Drama Series	Power	Won
2019	NAACP Image Awards	Outstanding Drama Series	Power	Won
