= Power Book III: Raising Kanan =

2021 American crime drama television series

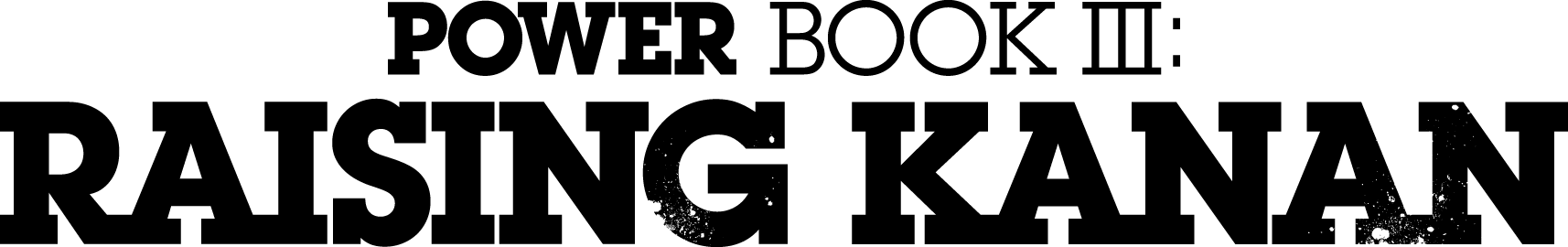
- Genre: Crime drama
- Created by: Sascha Penn
- Based on: Power created by Courtney A. Kemp
- Starring: Mekai Curtis; Patina Miller; London Brown; Malcolm Mays; Joey Bada$$; Hailey Kilgore; Shanley Caswell; Toby Sandeman; Lovie Simone; Omar Epps; Antonio Ortiz; Grantham Coleman; Shameik Moore
- Narrated by: 50 Cent
- Opening theme: "Part of the Game" by 50 Cent and NLE Choppa
- Country of origin: United States
- Original language: English
- No. of seasons: 5
- No. of episodes: 48

Production
- Executive producers: Courtney A. Kemp; 50 Cent; Sascha Penn; Rob Hardy; Kevin Fox; Danielle De Jesus; Chris Salek; Mark Canton; Shana Stein; Bart Wenrich
- Producers: Anita Gibson; Frank L. Fleming; Dorothy Canton; Tim Christenson; David Prace
- Running time: 50–60 minutes
- Production companies: Ballpoint Productions; End of Episode, Inc.; G-Unit Film & Television Inc.; Atmosphere Television; Canton Entertainment; CBS Studios; Lionsgate Television

Original release
- Network: Starz
- Release: July 18, 2021 – August 7, 2026

Related
- Power Universe

Power Book III: Raising Kanan, or simply Raising Kanan, is an American crime drama television series created by Sascha Penn that premiered on July 18, 2021, on Starz. It is a standalone prequel, and the second spin-off, to Power.

The third season premiered on December 1, 2023. In November 2023, ahead of its third-season premiere, the series was renewed for a fourth season, which premiered on March 7, 2025. On March 27, 2024, the series was renewed for the fifth and final season which premiered on June 12, 2026.

== Premise ==
Set in the 1990s, Raising Kanan chronicles the early years of Kanan Stark (the character first played by executive producer Curtis "50 Cent" Jackson), as he gets into the drug game as he helps his mom's growing drug business.

== Cast and characters ==
=== Main ===
- Mekai Curtis as Kanan Stark, Raq's son
- Patina Miller as Raquel "Raq" Thomas, Kanan's mother; one of two major drug lords of Queens
- London Brown as Marvin Thomas, Jukebox's father and Kanan's uncle. He is Raq and Lou's older brother
- Malcolm Mays as Louis "Lou-Lou" Thomas, Kanan's uncle. He is Raq and Marvin's younger brother (seasons 1–4; guest season 5)
- Joey Bada$$ as Kadeem "Unique" Mathis, Raq's rival drug lord and later love interest
- Hailey Kilgore as LaVerne "Jukebox" Thomas, Kanan's cousin and Marvin's daughter
- Shanley Caswell as Shannon Burke (seasons 1–2; guest season 3)
- Toby Sandeman as Symphony Bosket, Raq's boyfriend (season 1; recurring season 2)
- Lovie Simone as Davina Harrison, Kanan's girlfriend (season 1)
- Omar Epps as Malcolm Howard, NYPD Detective and Kanan's biological father (seasons 1–3; guest season 4)
- Antonio Ortiz as Shawn 'Famous' Figueroa, Kanan's best friend and aspiring rapper (seasons 2–3, recurring season 1)
- Grantham Coleman as Ronnie Mathis, Unique's stoic and ruthless older brother, who was recently released from prison (season 3; guest season 4)
- Shameik Moore as Branford "Breeze" Frady, Kanan's close associate (season 5; guest season 4)

=== Recurring ===
- Sharon Washington as Joyce Thomas, Raquel, Marvin, and Louis's mother, Kanan and Jukebox's grandmother (seasons 1–4)
- AnnaLynne McCord as Toni Deep (seasons 1–2)
- Natalee Linez as Jessica Figueroa, Famous' manager and sister and Lou's ex-girlfriend (seasons 1–2 and 4–5)
- Ade Chike Torbert as Scrappy (seasons 1–2; guest season 3), one of Raq's most trusted soldiers
- Annabelle Zasowski as Nicole Bingham, Jukebox's girlfriend (season 1)
- Quincy Brown as Crown Camacho (seasons 1–2), record label owner/producer of Bulletproof Records
- John Clay III as Worrell (seasons 1–2), Unique's right-hand man
- Terence Archie as Andre Barnes, Thomas family's attorney (seasons 1–4)
- Lebrodrick Benson as CJ
- Lawrence Gilliard Jr. as Azumadeen "Deen" Tippet (seasons 1–3), distributor of the drugs to Unique and Raq.
- Dorothi Fox as Deen's grandmother (seasons 1–3)
- LeToya Luckett as Kenya Pierce, Jukebox's mother and Marvin's ex who left the family to make it as a professional singer in Los Angeles (season 2)
- Omar Dorsey as Cartier "Duns" Fareed (season 2)
- Krystal Joy Brown as Renée Timmons (season 2)
- Danny Mastrogiorgio as Jimmy (season 2)
- Paulina Singer as Zisa, Lou's new aspiring singer (season 2)
- Michael Rispoli as Sal Boselli, Mafia Don of NJ (seasons 2–3)
- Paloma Guzman as Detective Regina Foyle
- KJ Smith as Palomar, Corinne's mother and Kanan's ex-lover (season 2)
- Josephine Lawrence as Corinne, Palomar's daughter and Kanan's love interest (season 2)
- Chyna Layne as Andrea, Howard's ex-lover (season 2)
- Tony Danza as Stefano Marchetti (seasons 3–5; guest season 2)
- Wendell Pierce as Ishmael "Snaps" Henry (seasons 3–5)
- Erika Woods as Stephanie 'Pop' Henry (seasons 3–5)
- Liv Symone as Iesha (season 3; guest seasons 4–5) Jukebox's former bandmate in the group Butta
- Aliyah Turner as Krystal (seasons 3–4), Kanan's latest lover and mother of his unborn child and Jukebox's former bandmate in the group Butta
- Lev Gorn as Detective Arthur Ogden (season 3)
- Sibongile Mlambo as Imani Okoye (season 4)
- Paul Ben-Victor as Phil Russo (season 4)
- Leslie Grossman as Florence "Flossie" Siegel (season 5)
- Joe Pantoliano as Pino Bernardi (season 5)
- Asjha Cooper as Jarita (season 5)

== Episodes ==
=== Series overview ===
Season	Episodes	Originally released	
Season	Episodes	First released	Last released
1	10	July 18, 2021	September 26, 2021
2	10	August 14, 2022	October 23, 2022
3	10	December 1, 2023	February 9, 2024
4	10	March 7, 2025	May 16, 2025
5	8	June 12, 2026	August 7, 2026

=== Season 1 (2021) ===
No. overall	No. in season	Title	Directed by	Written by	Original release date	US viewers (millions)
1	1	"Back in the Day"	Rob Hardy	Sascha Penn	July 18, 2021	0.438
2	2	"Reaping and Sowing"	Mario Van Peebles	Bashir Gavriel & Sascha Penn	July 25, 2021	0.392
3	3	"Stick and Move"	Lisa Leone	Josef Sawyer	August 1, 2021	0.307
4	4	"Don't Sleep"	Hernan Otaño	Santa Sierra	August 8, 2021	0.378
5	5	"Choose Your Battles"	Eif Rivera	Mike Flynn	August 15, 2021	0.386
6	6	"Level Up"	Kieron Hawkes	Dylan C. Brown	August 29, 2021	0.348
7	7	"Stay in Your Lane"	Lisa Leone	Nina Manni	September 5, 2021	0.270
8	8	"The Cost of Business"	Hernan Otaño	Tash Gray	September 12, 2021	0.418
9	9	"Loyal to the End"	Bart Wenrich	Matt K. Turner	September 19, 2021	0.486
10	10	"Paid in Full"	Rob Hardy	Kevin Fox	September 26, 2021	0.458

=== Season 2 (2022) ===
No. overall	No. in season	Title	Directed by	Written by	Original release date	US viewers (millions)
11	1	"The More Things Change"	Mario Van Peebles	Sascha Penn	August 14, 2022	0.345
12	2	"Mind Your Business"	Eif Rivera	Santa Sierra	August 21, 2022	0.269
13	3	"Sleeping Dogs"	Shana Stein	Nina Manni	August 28, 2022	0.232
14	4	"Pay the Toll"	Monty DeGraff	Dylan C. Brown	September 4, 2022	0.211
15	5	"What Happens in the Catskills"	Hernán Otaño	Tash Gray	September 11, 2022	0.206
16	6	"It's a Business, Man"	Bart Wenrich	Mike Flynn	September 18, 2022	0.213
17	7	"No Love Lost"	Joy T. Lane	Josef Sawyer	October 2, 2022	0.220
18	8	"A House Is Not a Home"	Stacey Muhammad & Monty DeGraff	Matt K. Turner	October 9, 2022	0.235
19	9	"Anti-Trust"	Erica Watson	Kevin Fox	October 16, 2022	0.210
20	10	"If Y'Don't Know, Now Y'Know"	Rob Hardy	Sascha Penn & Naja Rayne	October 23, 2022	0.273

=== Season 3 (2023–24) ===
No. overall	No. in season	Title	Directed by	Written by	Original release date	US viewers (millions)
21	1	"Home Sweet Home"	Rob Hardy	Sascha Penn	December 1, 2023	0.199
22	2	"Flipmode"	Brendan Walsh	Dylan C. Brown	December 8, 2023	0.190
23	3	"Open for Business"	Bobby Kennedy	Michael M. Chang	December 15, 2023	0.215
24	4	"In Sheep's Clothing"	Monty DeGraff	Santa Sierra	December 22, 2023	0.233
25	5	"Brothers and Keepers"	Joy T. Lane	Naja Rayne	December 29, 2023	0.236
26	6	"Into the Darkness"	Cierra 'Shooter' Glaude	Nina Manni	January 12, 2024	0.217
27	7	"Where All Are Guilty"	Sascha Penn	Brian Walker	January 19, 2024	0.256
28	8	"Reckonings"	Dawn Wilkinson, Monty DeGraff & Sascha Penn	Tash Gray	January 26, 2024	0.202
29	9	"Home to Roost"	Monty DeGraff	Kevin Fox	February 2, 2024	0.321
30	10	"Made You Look"	Eif Rivera	Sascha Penn & Albert Minnis	February 9, 2024	0.239

=== Season 4 (2025) ===
No. overall	No. in season	Title	Directed by	Written by	Original release date	US viewers (millions)
31	1	"Gangstas Don't Die"	Mario Van Peebles	Sascha Penn & Albert Minnis	March 7, 2025	N/A
32	2	"It's All Love"	Monty DeGraff	Dylan C. Brown	March 14, 2025	N/A
33	3	"Bygones"	Crystle Roberson	Michael M. Chang	March 21, 2025	N/A
34	4	"The Way We Were"	Dylan C. Brown	Naja Rayne	March 28, 2025	N/A
35	5	"The Nail That Sticks Up"	Cierra 'Shooter' Glaude	Brian Walker and Sascha Penn	April 4, 2025	N/A
36	6	"The Price of Fame"	Monica Raymund	Kevin Fox	April 11, 2025	N/A
37	7	"Allow Me to Re-Introduce Myself"	Tchaiko Omawale	Kevin Fox	April 18, 2025	N/A
38	8	"Street Struck"	Lionel Coleman	Sascha Penn	May 2, 2025	N/A
39	9	"It's About That Time"	Ben Semanoff	Sascha Penn	May 9, 2025	N/A
40	10	"Gimme the Weight"	Rob Hardy	Sascha Penn	May 16, 2025	N/A

=== Season 5 (2026) ===
No. overall	No. in season	Title	Directed by	Written by	Original release date	US viewers (millions)
41	1	"By Blood"	Dylan C. Brown	Sascha Penn	June 12, 2026	N/A
42	2	"Many Men"	Joy T. Lane	Sascha Penn & Sejal Pachisia	June 19, 2026	N/A
43	3	"Tricks"	Joseph Sikora	Naja Rayne	June 26, 2026	N/A
44	4	"Pawns & Rooks"	Pete Chatmon	Cris Blak	July 3, 2026	N/A
45	5	"School of War"	Mario Van Peebles	Michael M. Chang	July 10, 2026	N/A
46	6	"Dark Matter"	Eif Rivera	Dylan C. Brown	July 24, 2026	N/A
47	7	"Penultimate Means Second to Last"	Lionel Coleman	Sascha Penn	July 31, 2026	N/A
48	8	"Unconditional Love"	Rob Hardy	Sascha Penn	August 7, 2026	N/A

== Production ==
The series was first announced in February 2020. On July 12, 2021, Starz renewed the series for a second season ahead of its premiere. The second season premiered on August 14, 2022. On August 11, 2022, ahead of its second season premiere, Starz renewed the series for a third season, which premiered on December 1, 2023. On November 28, 2023, ahead of its third season premiere, Starz renewed the series for a fourth season, which premiered on March 7, 2025. On March 27, 2024, Starz renewed the series for a fifth season. In May 2025, the fifth season was confirmed to be its last. It premiered on June 12, 2026.

== Reception ==
The review aggregator website Rotten Tomatoes reported a 100% approval rating with an average rating of 9.3/10, based on 6 critic reviews.
