= Asjha Cooper =

American actress

- Occupation: Actress
- Years active: 2010–present

Asjha Cooper (Note: Pronounced /ˈeɪʒə/ AY-zhuh) is an American actress. She is best known for playing Kia Williams in the drama series All American and Vanessa Taylor in the drama series Chicago Med.

== Early life ==
Cooper is from Denton, Texas.

== Career ==
Cooper made her on screen debut in an episode of the drama series Friday Night Lights. Coopers first big role was playing the lead role of Jessica in the drama series Secret Diary of an American Cheerleader. She played the recurring role of Eva in the crime drama series Snowfall. She played Valencia Beam in the pilot episode of the sitcom None of the Above but the series never materialised. She played Alexandra Crisp, one of the lead characters in the slasher film Someone Inside Your House. She played the lead character Shawn in the horror film Black as Night. Her biggest role so far has been playing Vanessa Taylor for 2 seasons in the drama series Chicago Med. She hopes in the future on top of acting she gets to work behind the camera as a screenwriter of director.

== Filmography ==
=== Film ===
Year	Title	Role	Notes
2016	Everybody Wants Some!!	Sharon	
2021	There's Someone Inside Your House	Alex Crisp	
2021	Black as Night	Shawna	

=== Television ===
Year	Title	Role	Notes
2010	Friday Night Lights	Tinker's Sister	Episode: "The Lights in Carroll Park"
2013	The New Normal	Nikki-age 17	Episode: "Rocky Bye Baby"
2013	Secret Diary of an American Cheerleader	Jessica	8 episodes
2013	The First Family	Princess Sunita	Episode: "The First Love Exchange"
2014	Sam & Cat	Kathy	Episode: "#MagicATM"
2014	Faking It	Jeannie	Episode: "Remember the Croquembouche"
2014	Hysteria	Tionne Deering	Episode: "Pilot"
2014-2015	The Fosters	Allison	2 episodes
2019	Snowfall	Eva	5 episodes
2021	None of the Above	Valencia Beam	Episode: "Pilot". Unaired
2022	The Boys Presents: Diabolical	Ghost	Voice; Episode: "An Animated Short Where Pissed-Off Supes Kill Their Parents"
2021-2022	Chicago Med	Dr Vanessa Taylor	Recurring role; 29 episodes
2023-2024	All American	Kia Williams	Recurring role; 17 episodes
2025	Side Quest	Kourtney	Episode: "Fugue"
2026	Power Book III: Raising Kanan	Jarita	6 episodes
