= Sascha Penn =

American television writer and producer

Sascha Penn is an American writer and producer for television and film. He is the creator, showrunner and executive producer of the television series Power Book III: Raising Kanan (2021–2026). He also co-wrote the screenplay of the film 1992 (2024).

== Unrealized projects ==
In May 2008, it was announced that Penn would write the screenplay adaptation of the Stuart Gibbs novel The Last Equation for Lionsgate.

In December 2013, it was reported Penn would write the screenplay of a "firefighter action film" for Lionsgate.

In June 2014, it was reported that Penn was hired by MGM to write the screenplay of a remake of the 1980 Taylor Hackford film The Idolmaker.

Penn also wrote an unsold CBS television pilot titled Main Justice.

== Personal life ==
Penn married Leslie Grossman in July 2025.
