= Joseph Sikora =

American actor

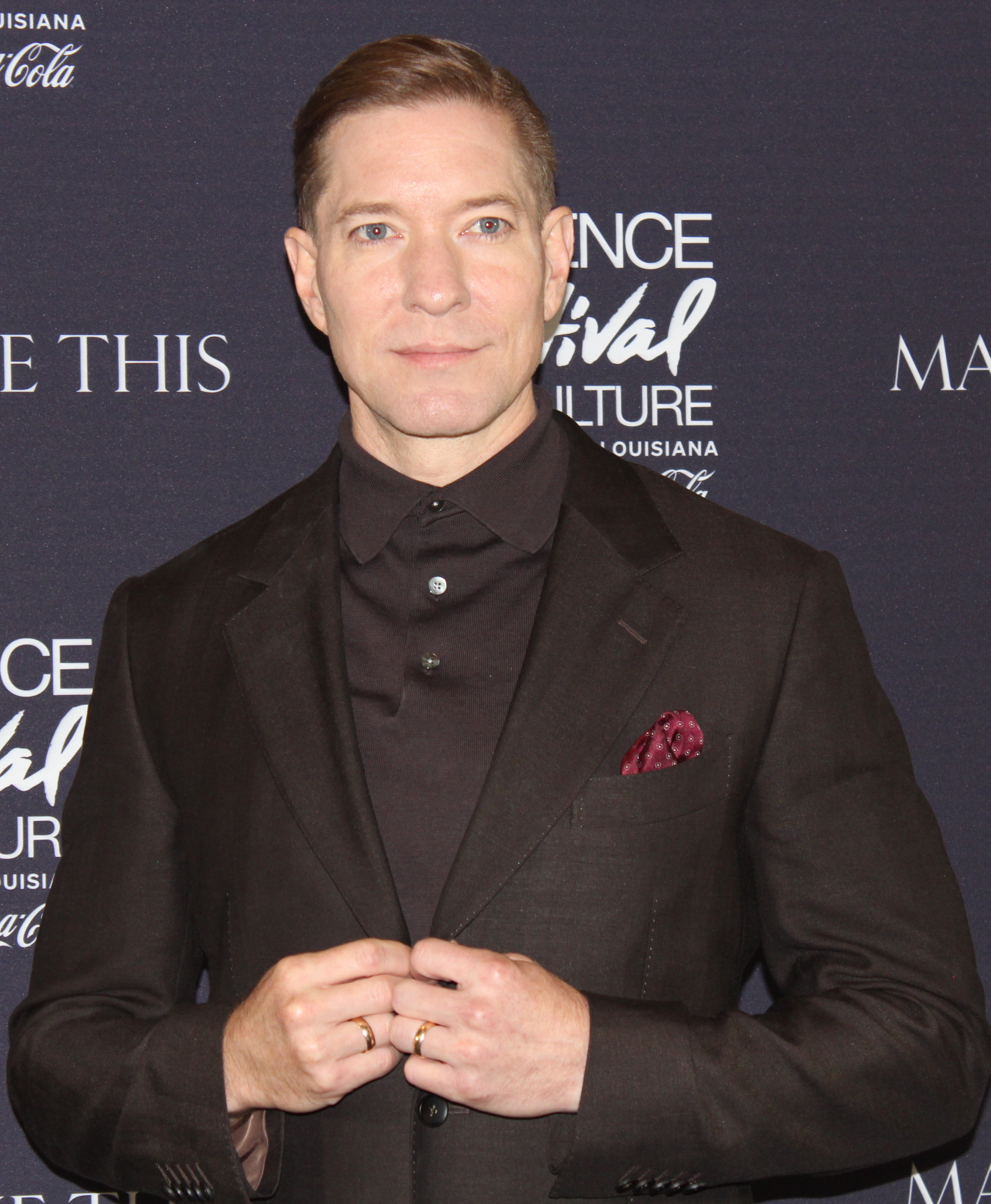
- Sikora at EssenceFest 2025 in July.
- Born: Chicago, Illinois, U.S.
- Education: DePaul University; Columbia College Chicago (BFA)
- Occupation: Actor
- Years active: 1987–present
- Known for: Portraying Tommy Egan in Power, Book II and Book IV
- Spouse: Tania Ribalow

Joseph Sikora is an American actor known for his starring role as Tommy Egan on the Starz series Power and its subsequent spin-offs and sequels, Power Book II: Ghost, Power Book IV: Force and Power: Legacy, in which he is the protagonist.

== Early life ==
Sikora was born in Chicago, Illinois to mother Barbara and father Albin. One of three boys, he lived in the Jefferson Park and Norwood Park neighborhoods. He is of Polish and Dutch descent. He graduated high school from Notre Dame College Prep in 1994, studied toward a Bachelor of Fine Arts in acting at The Theatre School at DePaul University from 1994 to 1996, and graduated from Columbia College Chicago in 1998.

== Career ==
As a teenager, Sikora appeared in a McDonald's commercial with Michael Jordan in 1990. He made his Broadway debut in 2006 after he was cast as one of the leads on The Caine Mutiny Court-Martial. He is also an ensemble member of Chicago's Shattered Globe Theatre Company.

Sikora made his television debut in an episode of The New Adam-12 after playing extras on a few TV shows. He was cast as Johnny in Rudy. After small appearances in TV shows and films such as Early Edition, Turks, The Watcher, and Ghost World, he was cast in two episodes of Third Watch.

In 2003, Sikora was cast as Roger in the direct-to-video biographical-drama film Gacy. After a few appearances in low-budget movies, he was cast in the Golden Globe-nominated Normal. It was there that he had what he considers his "breakthrough" moment: when the film's star, Tom Wilkinson, told him, "All you have to do is think the line and the camera will read it".

Sikora also appeared onstage. He was part of the Geffen Theatre's production of Fat Pig and the Los Angeles Theatre's production of Killer Joe. He made many TV appearances between 2005 and 2012, including major network shows such as NYPD Blue (as Detective Joe Slovak), ER, Grey's Anatomy, Criminal Minds, Without a Trace, CSI: Miami, Prison Break, White Collar, Lost, and Dollhouse. He appeared the 2007 horror film Night Skies.

He appeared in two episodes of Law & Order: Special Victims Unit in 2010. That year, he also portrayed Hans Schroeder in the HBO series Boardwalk Empire, and an orderly at the mental hospital in Shutter Island. In 2011, he was in the television pilot for Body of Proof, and had a full role in Adult Swim's comedy horror TV series The Heart, She Holler, as Sheriff. In early 2012, he appeared in Safe as the son of the head of the Russian mafia. He returned to theater in September 2012 with The Freedom of the City.

In 2012, Sikora appeared in the Tom Cruise feature film Jack Reacher as an Army sniper wrongfully accused of gunning down random people in Pittsburgh, who requests Jack Reacher's assistance to prove his innocence.

In October 2013, he was cast in the Starz original drama series Power.

In 2020, Sikora portrayed Frank Cosgrove Jr. on the third season of the Netflix crime drama Ozark, released on March 27, 2020. In 2021, he and his Black Fox Productions company signed a first look deal with Lionsgate TV.

== Filmography ==
=== Films ===
Year	Title	Role	Notes
1993	Rudy	17-Year-Old Johnny	
1997	My Best Friend's Wedding	Stoner Guy #1	
2000	The Watcher	Skater	
2001	Ghost World	Reggae Fan	
2002	Bounty	Matty	Short
2003	Normal	Wayne Applewood	TV movie
2003	Gacy	Roger	Video
2005	Home	Inmate	Short
2005	Nocturne	Trent	Short
2007	Night Skies	Joe	
2007	Charlie Wilson's War	Chess Player	
2008	Fashion Victim	Agent Reichman	
2008	Pants on Fire	Wayne	
2010	Shutter Island	Glen Miga	
2010	Trust	Rob Moscone	
2011	The Best Man for the Job	Tommy	
2012	Safe	Vassily Docheski	
2012	Jack Reacher	James Mark Barr	
2012	White Alligator	Brad Paul	
2018	That's Harassment	Him	Short
2018	The Separatists	Finn	Short
2019	The Intruder	Mike	
2019	Jacob's Ladder	Paul Rutiger	
2023	Fear	Rom Jennings	

=== Television ===
Year	Title	Role	Notes
1987	Roomies	Ray	Episode: "The Ditch"
1990	The New Adam-12	Unknown	Episode: "The Sniper"
1993	Dr. Quinn, Medicine Woman	Guard #2	Episode: "The Prisoner"
1993	Missing Persons	Andy Tedesco	Episode: "I Can't Even Imagine"
1998	Early Edition	Rick Williams	Episode: "Teen Angels"
1999	Turks	Pete Cedros	Episode: "Friends & Strangers"
2000	Walker, Texas Ranger	Brophy	Episode: "The Day of Cleansing"
2000	Movie Stars	Simon	Episode: "Last Dance"
2002	Frasier	Man in Bar	Episode: "Moons Over Seattle"
2003	JAG	Petty Officer Atwood	Episode: "Pulse Rate"
2004	Monk	Boz Harrelson	Episode: "Mr. Monk and the Paperboy"
2004	Third Watch	J.D. Hart	Episode: "Purgatory" & "Spanking the Monkey"
2004	CSI: NY	Joe Riggs	Episode: "A Man a Mile"
2005	Carnivàle	Punk	Episode: "Outskirts, Damascus, NE"
2005	NYPD Blue	Detective Joe Slovak	Episode: "Moving Day"
2005	ER	Riley	Episode: "The Show Must Go On"
2005	Grey's Anatomy	Shane Herman	Episode: "Something to Talk About"
2005	Criminal Minds	Jimmy Baker	Episode: "Natural Born Killer"
2006	Without a Trace	Malcolm Neilus	Episode: "Patient X"
2006	CSI: Miami	Howard Benchley	Episode: "Collision"
2006	Prison Break	Sara's Boyfriend	Episode: "Brother's Keeper"
2008	Lost	Co-Pilot	Episode: "There's No Place Like Home: Part 1"
2009	Dollhouse	Terry Karrens	Episode: "Belle Chose"
2010	Rubicon	Daniel Burns	Episode: "Keep the Ends Out" & "The Outsider"
2010	Law & Order: Special Victims Unit	Jason Gambel	Recurring cast: Season 12
2010–11	Boardwalk Empire	Hans Schroeder	Episode: "Boardwalk Empire" & "Georgia Peaches"
2011	Body of Proof	Tom Hanson	Episode: "Pilot"
2011	White Collar	Jonas Ganz	Episode: "Countermeasures"
2011	Blue Bloods	Mark Phelan	Episode: "Silver Star"
2011–13	The Heart, She Holler	Sheriff	Main Cast: Seasons 1–2
2013	The Good Wife	Agent Norwich	Episode: "Whack-a-Mole"
2014	True Detective	Ginger	Recurring cast: Season 1
2014	Unforgettable	Bob	Episode: "East of Islip"
2014	Banshee	Matt Sharp	Recurring cast: Season 2
2014–20	Power	Tommy Egan	Main Cast
2015	The Player	Dominic McCall	Episode: "Ante Up"
2016	Chicago P.D.	Kevin Bingham	Episode: "Start Digging"
2016–17	Underground	Jack 'Frog Jack'	Recurring cast: Season 1, guest: Season 2
2018	Maniac	J.C.	Recurring cast
2020	The Shivering Truth	Additional Voices	Episode: "Carrion My Son"
2021, 2023	Power Book II: Ghost	Tommy Egan	Episode: "Heart of Darkness", Season 3: Episodes 9-10
2021, 2023	Teenage Euthanasia	Additional Voices	Episode: "The Bad Bang Theory" & "Suddenly Susan"
2020–22	Ozark	Frank Cosgrove Jr.	Recurring cast: Seasons 3–4
2022–2026	Power Book IV: Force	Tommy Egan	Lead Role
2025	Reasonable Doubt	Bill Sterling	Main Cast (Season 3)
TBA	Power: Legacy	Tommy Egan	Lead Role

=== Music videos ===
Year	Music video	Artist(s)	Ref.
2022	"Do We Have a Problem?"	Nicki Minaj and Lil Baby	
