= Power (TV series) =

American drama television series

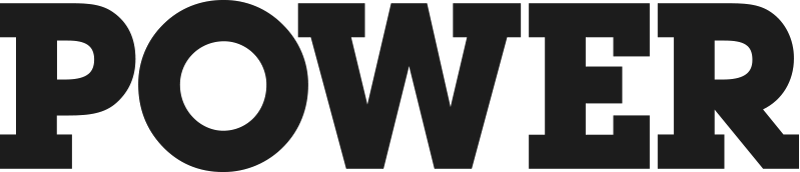
- Genre: Crime drama
- Created by: Courtney A. Kemp
- Starring: Omari Hardwick; Lela Loren; Naturi Naughton; Joseph Sikora; Andy Bean; Adam Huss; Kathrine Narducci; Luis Antonio Ramos; Greg Serano; Sinqua Walls; Lucy Walters; Shane Johnson; J. R. Ramirez; Rotimi Akinosho; David Fumero; Curtis "50 Cent" Jackson; Michael Rainey Jr.; Jerry Ferrara; Callan Mulvey; La La Anthony; Matt Cedeño; Sung Kang; William Sadler; Brandon Victor Dixon; Larenz Tate; Michael J. Ferguson; Mike Dopud; Monique Gabriela Curnen; Cynthia Addai-Robinson; Evan Handler
- Opening theme: "Big Rich Town" by 50 Cent and Joe (produced by Vitamin D)
- Composer: Jeff Russo
- Country of origin: United States
- Original languages: English; Spanish
- No. of seasons: 6
- No. of episodes: 63 (list of episodes)

Production
- Executive producers: Courtney A. Kemp; Gary Lennon; David Knoller; Curtis Jackson; Mark Canton; Randall Emmett
- Producers: Bart Wenrich; Shana Stein; Heather Zuhlke; Raphael Jackson, Jr.; Tavonga Kai Bobby Madsura Milan Dhliwayo; Denise Pinckley; Michael Rainey Jr.
- Running time: 51–82 minutes
- Production companies: End of Episode, Inc.; Mawuli Productions; Atmosphere Television; G-Unit Film & Television Inc.; CBS Television Studios; Starz Originals

Original release
- Network: Starz
- Release: June 7, 2014 – February 9, 2020

Related
- Power Universe

Power is an American crime drama television series created and produced by Courtney A. Kemp in collaboration with Curtis "50 Cent" Jackson. It aired on the Starz network from June 7, 2014 to February 9, 2020.

Upon release, Power gained positive reviews and is one of Starz's highest-rated shows and one of cable's mostwatched shows. Prior to the fifth-season premiere, Starz renewed the show for a sixth and final season, which premiered on August 25, 2019. The series has led to three aired spin-offs and an additional two in development.

== Overview ==
Power tells the story of James St. Patrick, an intelligent, smooth yet ruthless drug dealer who goes by the alias of "Ghost." He wishes to leave the criminal world to pursue legitimate business interests as a nightclub owner. St. Patrick aims to balance those two lives, while also avoiding police capture, trying to navigate his crumbling marriage and manage shifting economic alliances.

The show features James' family, which consists of his wife Tasha, twins Tariq and Raina and baby Yasmine. Power also follows James' criminal partner and best friend Tommy Egan, love interest and criminal prosecutor Angela Valdes, friend-turned-rival Kanan Stark, protege and rival Andre Coleman, and Angela's colleague, Cooper Saxe. Defense attorney Joe Proctor, district attorney John Mak and politician Rashad Tate also appear in the show's later seasons.

Power utilizes intertwined character dynamics and episodic cliffhangers as plot devices to carry its story forward.

== Episodes ==
| Season | Episodes | Originally released | |
| Season | Episodes | First released | Last released |
|---|---|---|---|
| 1 | 8 | June 7, 2014 | August 2, 2014 |
| 2 | 10 | June 6, 2015 | August 15, 2015 |
| 3 | 10 | July 17, 2016 | September 25, 2016 |
| 4 | 10 | June 25, 2017 | September 3, 2017 |
| 5 | 10 | July 1, 2018 | September 9, 2018 |
| 6 | 15 | August 25, 2019 | February 9, 2020 |

== Cast and characters ==
| Actor | Character | Seasons | | | | | |
| Actor | Character | 1 | 2 | 3 | 4 | 5 | 6 |
|---|---|---|---|---|---|---|---|
| Omari Hardwick | James "Ghost" St. Patrick | Main | Main | Main | Main | Main | Main |
| Lela Loren | Angela Valdes | Main | Main | Main | Main | Main | Main (Note: Credited as starring only when present) |
| Naturi Naughton | Tasha St. Patrick | Main | Main | Main | Main | Main | Main |
| Joseph Sikora | Thomas "Tommy" Egan | Main | Main | Main | Main | Main | Main |
| Andy Bean | Gregory "Greg" Knox | Main | Main | Main | | | |
| Adam Huss | Joshua "Josh" Kantos | Main | Main | Recurring | | | |
| Kathrine Narducci | Frankie Lavarro | Main | Guest | | | | |
| Luis Antonio Ramos | Carlos Ruiz | Main | Main | Main | | | |
| Greg Serano | Juan Julio Medina | Main | | Recurring | | Recurring | |
| Sinqua Walls | Shawn Stark | Main | Main | | | | |
| Lucy Walters | Holly Weaver | Main | Main | Main | | | |
| Shane Johnson | Cooper Saxe | Recurring | Main | Main | Main | Main | Main |
| J. R. Ramirez | Julio Romano | Recurring | Main | Main | Main | | |
| Rotimi Akinosho | Andre "Dre" Coleman | | Main | Main | Main | Main | Main |
| David Fumero | Miguel "Mike" Sandoval | | Main | Main | Main | | |
| Curtis "50 Cent" Jackson | Kanan Stark | Recurring | Recurring | Main | Main | Main | Main (Note: Credited as starring only when present) |
| Michael Rainey Jr. | Tariq St. Patrick | Recurring | Recurring | Main | Main | Main | Main |
| Jerry Ferrara | Joseph "Joe" Proctor | | Recurring | Main | Main | Main | Main |
| Callan Mulvey | Dean / Milan | | | Main | | | |
| Alani "La La" Anthony | Lakeisha Grant | Recurring | Recurring | Recurring | Main | Main | Main |
| Matt Cedeño | Diego "Cristobal" Martinez | | Recurring | Recurring | Main | Main | |
| Sung Kang | John Mak | | | | Main | Main | Guest |
| William Sadler | Anthony "Tony" Teresi | | | | Main | Main | |
| Brandon Victor Dixon | Deleterious "Terry" Silver | | | | Recurring | Main | |
| Larenz Tate | Rashad Tate | | | | Recurring | Main | Main |
| Michael J. Ferguson | Francis "2-Bit" Johnson | | Recurring | Recurring | Recurring | Recurring | Main |
| Mike Dopud | Jason Micic | | | | Recurring | Recurring | Main |
| Monique Gabriela Curnen | Blanca Rodriguez | | | | | Recurring | Main |
| Cynthia Addai-Robinson | Ramona Garrity | | | | | | Main |
| Evan Handler | Jacob Warner | | | | | | Main |

=== Main ===
- Omari Hardwick as James "Ghost" St. Patrick, a high-level drug distributor and nightclub owner. A smart, well dressed and calculated man, yet will not hesitate to kill if necessary. He is married to Tasha, is the father of Tariq, Raina, and Yasmine St. Patrick, and is also romantically involved with AUSA Angela Valdes.
- Lela Loren as Angela Valdes, an Assistant United States Attorney tasked with prosecuting Ghost unaware of his real identity. She went to the same high school as St. Patrick and Egan. She is St. Patrick's love interest and mistress.
- Naturi Naughton as Tasha St. Patrick (née Green), Ghost's wife and criminal accomplice. She has romantic affairs with Kanan's son Shawn and attorney Terry Silver. She is also Q's new love interest.
- Joseph Sikora as Thomas "Tommy" Egan, Ghost's hot headed partner, best friend, and the godfather to his children. Egan is seen as an honorary member of his family.
- Andy Bean as Gregory "Greg" Knox, an FBI agent assigned to the Ghost/Lobos case and Angela's former love interest (seasons 1–3)
- Adam Huss as Joshua "Josh" Kantos (seasons 1–2; recurring season 3)
- Kathrine Narducci as Frankie Lavarro (season 1; guest season 2)
- Luis Antonio Ramos as Carlos Ruiz (seasons 1–3)
- Greg Serano as Juan Julio Medina (season 1; recurring seasons 3 and 5)
- Sinqua Walls as Shawn Stark, Kanan's son who is also the personal chauffeur and loyal bodyguard of Ghost. But he starts an affair with Tasha. (seasons 1–2)
- Lucy Walters as Holly, a petty criminal and waitress at Truth and the love interest to Tommy (seasons 1–3)
- Shane Johnson as Cooper Saxe, a fellow attorney and Angela's colleague also assigned to the Ghost case. (seasons 2–6; recurring season 1)
- J. R. Ramirez as Julio Moreno, Ghost and Tommy's right-hand man and a former Toros Locos gang member. (seasons 2–4; recurring season 1)
- Rotimi Akinosho as Andre "Dre" Coleman, a low-profile and ambitious drug dealer. He works with both Ghost and Kanan and eventually becomes a major player under Alicia Jiménez. (seasons 2–6)
- David Fumero as Miguel "Mike" Sandoval, a corrupt FBI Assistant U.S. Attorney (seasons 2–4)
- Curtis Jackson as Kanan Stark, a fellow drug dealer and Ghost's and Tommy's former mentor-turned rival. Stark is the series' anti-hero. Prior to the events of the series, he was set up by Ghost and Tasha to go to prison for ten years. (seasons 3–6; recurring seasons 1–2)
- Michael Rainey Jr. as Tariq James St. Patrick, Tasha and James's son. An honor student, he has a strained relationship with James/Ghost because of his marriage-ending relationship with Angela and lying about being involved in the drug game and being mentored by Kanan. Tariq has two sisters: a twin, Raina St. Patrick, who is later murdered by a crooked police officer, named Raymond "Ray Ray" Jones, when Tariq was involved in pulling home invasion robberies with Kanan and Ray Ray; and a younger sister, Yasmine St. Patrick. (seasons 3–6; recurring seasons 1–2)
- Jerry Ferrara as Joseph "Joe" Proctor, a criminal attorney who frequently represents Ghost and Tommy. (seasons 3–6; recurring season 2)
- Callan Mulvey as Dean / Milan (season 3)
- La La Anthony as Lakeisha Grant, Tasha's friend and criminal accomplice. She is a hairstylist and business owner. She becomes Tommy's love interest in the later seasons. (seasons 4–6; recurring seasons 1–3)
- Matt Cedeño as Diego "Cristobal" Martinez, Dre's best friend and a head of the Hermanos Tainos. (seasons 4–5; recurring seasons 2–3)
- Sung Kang as John Mak, an Assistant U.S. attorney who leads the case in the murder of FBI agent Greg Knox. (seasons 4–5; guest season 6)
- William Sadler as Anthony "Tony" Teresi, an incarcerated Italian-American gangster and caporegime in the Mosconi crime family. He is the father of Tommy Egan. (seasons 4–5)
- Brandon Victor Dixon as Deleterious "Terry" Silver (season 5; recurring season 4)
- Larenz Tate as Rashad Tate, a New York City councilman who is running for governor of New York. Tate uses James for PR for his campaign, as St. Patrick is viewed as an inspiration to potential urban voters. Tate is a former police officer and frequently participates in corruption. (seasons 5–6; recurring season 4)
- Michael J. Ferguson as Francis "2-Bit" Johnson, former accomplice of Dre/Kanan who runs with Tommy (season 6; recurring seasons 2–5)
- Mike Dopud as Jason Micic, Tommy's Serbian connect (season 6; recurring seasons 4–5)
- Monique Gabriela Curnen as Blanca Rodriguez (season 6; recurring season 5)
- Cynthia Addai-Robinson as Ramona Garrity, a political strategist for the DNC (season 6)
- Evan Handler as Jacob Warner (season 6)

=== Recurring ===
- Elizabeth Rodriguez as Paz Valdes, Angela's sister who maintains a dislike for James
- Donshea Hopkins as Raina St. Patrick, James and Tasha's eldest daughter and twin sister to Tariq (seasons 1–4; guest season 6)
- Enrique Murciano as Felipe Lobos, an international drug supplier who works with Ghost and Tommy (seasons 1–3)
- Quincy Tyler Bernstine as Tameika Robinson, the leader of the United States Department of Justice (seasons 5–6)
- Victor Garber as Simon Stern, a rival nightclub owner
- Ana de la Reguera as Alicia Jiménez, Diego's sister and one of the leaders of the Jiménez cartel (seasons 4–6)
- Patricia Kalember as Kate Egan, Tommy's mother (seasons 2–6)
- Bill Sage as Sammy, an Irish gangster who works with Tommy (seasons 4–5)
- Anika Noni Rose as Laverne "Jukebox" Ganner, a dirty cop and Kanan's cousin (seasons 3–4)
- Maurice Compte as Diego Jiménez, a rival drug supplier and one of the leaders of the Jiménez cartel (seasons 4–5)
- Avery Mason as Black "BG" Grimace, Tommy's right-hand man and valet
- Amaya Carr as Yasmine St. Patrick, James and Tasha's daughter and sister to Tariq
- Debbi Morgan as Estelle, Tasha's mother
- Denim Roberson as Cash Grant, LaKeisha's son
- Ty Jones as SAC Jerry Donovan, an FBI agent working on the Lobos and Jimenez cases (seasons 2–6)
- Mattea Conforti as Elisa Marie Proctor, Joey's daughter
- Aleksandar Popovic as Petar, a member of the Serbian organization who worked with Tommy (seasons 3–4)
- Andrea-Rachel Parker as Destiny, Tariq's ex fling (seasons 3–4)
- Tyrone Marshall Brown as Quinton "Q" Wallace, Tasha's new love interest (season 6)
- Joseph Perrino as Vincent Ragni, a member of the mob, Tommy and Tony conflicted with (seasons 4–6)
- Franky G as Poncho, the new primera for the Soldados Family, after Ruiz
- Gianni Paolo as Brayden Weston, Tariq's best friend and business partner
- Alix Lapri as Effie, Tariq's new love interest
- Omar Scroggins as Spottswood "Spanky" Richards, a childhood friend of Dre's and 2Bit's, who later works under Dre and Tommy (seasons 2–6)
- Glynn Turman as Gabriel, Ghost's uncle. (season 6)
- Charlie Murphy as Marshal Clyde Williams, a violent guard in Ghost's cell block (season 4)
- Jim Norton as Father Callahan, a priest who sells drugs for Tommy
- Lee Tergesen as Bailey Markham, a Homeland Security agent and Greg Knox's friend (seasons 3–4)
- Sonya Walger as Madeline Stern, Simon's wife
- C. S. Lee as Jae Shin, Korean crime boss. (seasons 2–3)
- Johnathan Park as Dylan, Jae Shin's son (seasons 2–3)
- Richard Ryker as Steve Tampio, a DEA agent Angela deals with
- Ian Paola as Uriel Diaz, leader of the Toros Locos
- Patrick R. Walker as Alphonse Clemons, former associate of Rashad Tate
- Victor Almanzar as Arturo Magdaleno, Dre and Cristobal's right-hand man and a new leader of the Toros Locos
- Darrell Britt-Gibson as Rolla, a close friend of Ghost's and leader of the RSK's (season 1)
- Danielle Thorpe as Lindsay Proctor, Joey's junkie ex-wife
- Mercedes Ruehl as Connie Teresi, Tony's wife
- Domenick Lombardozzi as Benny Civello, a member of the Civello crime family and Joey Proctor's cousin
- Michael Gaston as Judge Tapper, the judge on Ghost's case
- Sheena Sakai as Soo, Julio's girlfriend
- Maria Rivera as Maria Suarez, a witness Ghost spared (seasons 5–6; guest season 1)
- Vinicius Zorin-Machado as Nomar Arcielo, a Soldado turned informant for Angela (season 1)
- Johnny Serret as Sabueso, a drug courier for Ghost
- Leslie Lopez as "Pink Sneakers", an assassin hired to target Ghost's operation (seasons 1–2)
- Ivica Marc as Drago, Jason's right-hand man
- Gus Halper as Alby
- Cedric the Entertainer as Croop, a hitman Tate associates with. (season 6)
- Audrey Esparza as Liliana, Julio's friend, became Tommy's right-hand woman on Power Book IV: Force (season 1)

=== Special guest appearances ===
- Kendrick Lamar as Laces, a Dominican drug addict who works with Kanan (season 5)
- Jesse Williams as Kadeem, Lakeisha's ex, and father of their son, Cash (season 6)

== Broadcast ==
In Australia, all episodes are available to stream after their American airing on Stan. The show is available weekly after its US airing on Netflix in the United Kingdom and Ireland. In Scandinavia and Finland, all episodes are available to stream on HBO Nordic.

== Accolades ==
| Year | Award | Category | Nominee(s) | Result |
|---|---|---|---|---|
| 2015 | Women's Image Network Awards | Actress Drama Series | Naturi Naughton | Nominated |
| 2015 | Women's Image Network Awards | Outstanding Show Written by a Woman | Courtney A. Kemp | Nominated |
| 2016 | 47th NAACP Image Awards | Outstanding Drama Series | Power | Nominated |
| 2016 | 47th NAACP Image Awards | Outstanding Actor in a Drama Series | Omari Hardwick | Nominated |
| 2016 | 47th NAACP Image Awards | Outstanding Supporting Actress in a Drama Series | Naturi Naughton | Nominated |
| 2016 | NAMIC Vision Awards | Best Performance – Drama | Naturi Naughton | Nominated |
| 2016 | NAMIC Vision Awards | Best Performance – Drama | Omari Hardwick | Won |
| 2016 | Women's Image Network Awards | Actress Drama Series | Naturi Naughton | Nominated |
| 2017 | 48th NAACP Image Awards | Outstanding Drama Series | Power | Nominated |
| 2017 | 48th NAACP Image Awards | Outstanding Actor in a Drama Series | Omari Hardwick | Nominated |
| 2017 | 48th NAACP Image Awards | Outstanding Supporting Actress in a Drama Series | Naturi Naughton | Won |
| 2017 | Black Reel Awards for Television | Outstanding Drama Series | Power | Nominated |
| 2017 | People's Choice Awards | Favorite Premium Drama Series | Power | Nominated |
| 2018 | 49th NAACP Image Awards | Outstanding Drama Series | Power | Won |
| 2018 | 49th NAACP Image Awards | Outstanding Actor in a Drama Series | Omari Hardwick | Won |
| 2018 | 49th NAACP Image Awards | Outstanding Supporting Actress in a Drama Series | Naturi Naughton | Won |
| 2018 | 49th NAACP Image Awards | Outstanding Performance by a Youth (Series, Special, Television Movie or Limited Series) | Michael Rainey Jr. | Nominated |
| 2018 | Black Reel Awards for Television | Outstanding Actor, Drama Series | Omari Hardwick | Nominated |
| 2018 | NAMIC Vision Awards | Best Performance – Drama | 50 Cent | Nominated |
| 2018 | NAMIC Vision Awards | Best Performance – Drama | Michael Rainey Jr. | Nominated |
| 2018 | NAMIC Vision Awards | Drama | Power | Nominated |
| 2018 | 9th Hollywood Music in Media Awards | Outstanding Music Supervision – Television | Jennifer Ross | Won |
| 2019 | 50th NAACP Image Awards | Outstanding Drama Series | Power | Won |
| 2019 | 34th Annual Imagen Awards | Best Actress - Television | Lela Loren | Nominated |
| 2020 | 51st NAACP Image Awards | Outstanding Actor in a Drama Series | Omari Hardwick | Won |

== Reception ==
=== Critical response ===
==== Season 1 ====
Season 1 of Power received mixed reviews from critics. Review aggregator Metacritic gives the season a score of 57 out of 100, based on 15 reviews, indicating a mixed reaction to the series. Review aggregator Rotten Tomatoes gives the season a score of 44%, based on 18 reviews, with an average rating of 5.7/10. The site's consensus states, "Power suffers from excessive plotting and the use of overly familiar by-the-numbers story elements."

Tim Goodman of The Hollywood Reporter observed in his review, "Power seemingly wants to be a show that tells a big, complicated, meaningful story about, well, the perils and problems of power and how one man deals with them." Critic Brian Lowry of Variety states in his review, "The three previewed episodes of the show, created by The Good Wife alumna Courtney A. Kemp, move briskly enough, but they're still only moderately compelling. And while 50 Cent's participation provides some promotional heft (he has a cameo in a later episode), the allure of such behind-the-scenes marquee names is usually limited. Mostly, this is undemanding escapism with all the requisite pay-TV trappings, along the lines of what Cinemax is offering in episodic form. While that might be a formula to keep Ghost visible for some time to come, creatively speaking, it leaves Power a touch low on juice.

==== Season 2 ====
Review aggregator Rotten Tomatoes gives the season a score of 100%, based on 9 reviews, with an average rating of 7.8/10. Review aggregator Metacritic gives the season a score of 75 out of 100, based on 4 reviews, indicating a generally favorable reaction to the series. The New York Daily News staff writes in their review, "Power hits on all cylinders as it returns for its second season. Throw a couple of great women into Ghost's life—his wife, Tasha (Naturi Naughton), and his recently resurfaced lifelong flame Angela (Lela Loren)—and you have drama that's hard not to keep watching."

==== Season 3 ====
Rotten Tomatoes gives the season a score of 78%, based on 9 reviews, with an average rating of 6.3/10.

==== Season 4 ====
Rotten Tomatoes gives the season a score of 83%, based on 6 reviews, with an average rating of 8/10.

==== Season 5 ====
Rotten Tomatoes gives the season a score of 100%, based on 6 reviews, with an average rating of 8.8/10.

== Spin-offs ==
With the conclusion of the original series, it was announced that Starz had planned four upcoming spin-offs in the same universe as Power. These begin with Power Book II: Ghost, which, following shortly after the events of the original series, focuses on Ghost's son Tariq navigating his new criminal life and intending to shed his father's legacy while dealing with mounting pressure to protect his family, including his mother Tasha. The series co-stars Mary J. Blige and Method Man. The other spin-offs include: Power Book III: Raising Kanan, a prequel into the life of Kanan Stark (50 Cent); Power Book IV: Force, which follows Tommy Egan (Joseph Sikora) originally headed to Los Angeles, California and ending up in the city of Chicago; and Power Book V: Influence, a sequel set in the political world centering on Councilman Tate's (Larenz Tate) ruthless rise to power. The development of Power Book V: Influence was cancelled in August 2022 and the series would not be moving forward. In March 2024, a prequel series, Origins, which will follow the beginning story of characters Ghost and Tommy, was confirmed to be in development.

Power Book II: Ghost premiered on September 6, 2020, and has aired four seasons, ending on October 4, 2024.

Power Book III: Raising Kanan premiered on July 18, 2021, and has aired four seasons. In March 2024, ahead of the fourth season, the series was renewed for a fifth & final season.

Power Book IV: Force premiered on February 6, 2022, and has aired three seasons, ending on January 16, 2026.
