= Courtney A. Kemp =

American producer and writer (born 1977)

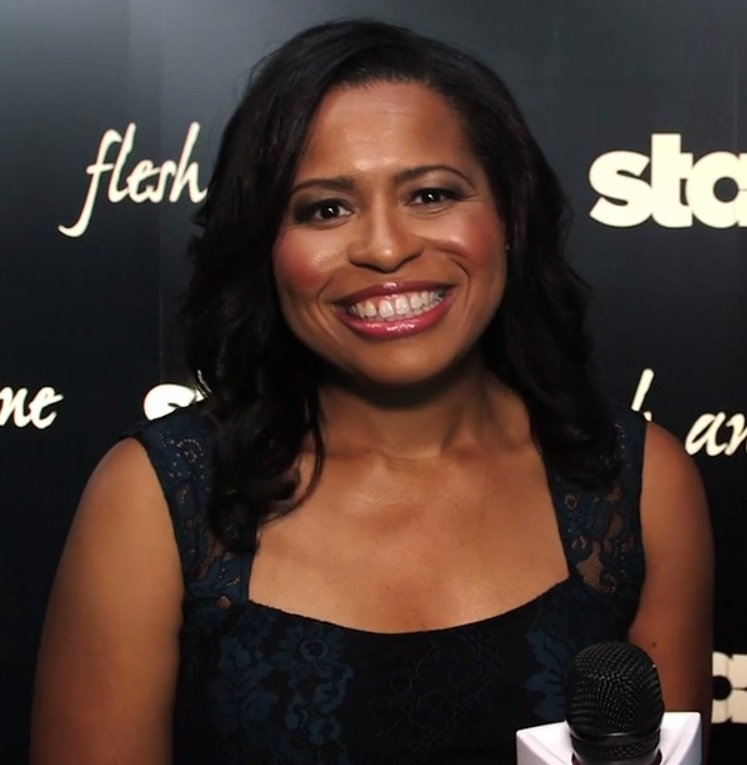
- Kemp in 2015
- Born: Courtney Kemp; May 4, 1977 (age 49); Norwalk, Connecticut, United States
- Education: Brown University; Columbia University
- Alma mater: Brown University (1998)
- Occupations: Television writer and producer
- Years active: 2005–present
- Known for: Creating Power Universe

Courtney A. Kemp (born May 4, 1977) is an American television writer and producer. She created the 2014 television series franchise Power Universe for the network Starz. She has written for such shows as The Good Wife and Beauty & the Beast.

== Early life and education ==
Kemp was raised in Westport, Connecticut, and began reading college textbooks at the age of eight. Her father Herbert Kemp Jr. was the first African American graduate of Dartmouth College Tuck School of Business. The Kemp family was one of the few African American families in Westport and faced discrimination. By the age of 10, she had begun reading plays by William Shakespeare, eventually coming up with her own stories. In 1994, she graduated from Staples High School and went on to receive a bachelor's degree from Brown University as well as a master's in English Literature from Columbia University.

== Career ==
Kemp initially hoped to become a journalist after graduating from Columbia University. She was an editorial assistant at Mademoiselle before the magazine shut down. Afterwards, she worked at GQ for three years. She then left the industry and started writing for the J.Crew catalogue. Kemp's job at GQ landed her many opportunities, including offers from several TV producers to adapt one of her pieces on interracial dating, into a show. Although this never materialized, it made her want to start producing for television.

At the age of 26, Kemp left Westport for Los Angeles, California to pursue a career in television writing. There, she became a staff writer for the then-Fox hit series The Bernie Mac Show. She then began writing for other television shows such as Eli Stone, Justice, and Beauty & the Beast (a 2012 remake of the 1987 series of the same name) before eventually becoming increasingly known for her writing of episodes for the CBS political drama series The Good Wife.

Her idea for what would become the first series she ever sold and pitched, Power, came about when she met rapper 50 Cent and executive producer Mark Canton at a coffeehouse in Los Angeles. She thought up the concept of a man destined to leave his life as a drug dealer behind him to become a successful club owner and businessman, and soon penned the script with 50 Cent and Canton alongside her, both serving as executive producers. The show aired on the Starz network from June 7, 2014 to February 9, 2020 and received critical acclaim. The success of the show spawned several spin-offs including Power Book II: Ghost, Power Book III: Raising Kanan, Power Book IV: Force, Power: Origins, and Power: Legacy. Kemp served as the showrunner for the series.

In 2020, it was announced that Kemp was working on a new show titled Dirty 30, a drama based on rogue NYPD officers. The show was reported to be streamed on HBO. However, as of 2026, the show has not been released. In August 2021, she signed a deal with Netflix.

== Personal life ==
Kemp's father, Herbert Kemp Jr., died in 2011. The first episode of Power was dedicated to his memory; he was the inspiration behind the main character James "Ghost" St. Patrick.

Courtney and her family lived in Westport, Connecticut where they were one of few black families residing in the town at the time and suffered racial harassment.

Kemp describes herself as having been a voracious reader in her youth with an interest in politics.

She has a child named Arden. Her ex-husband, former Paramount Pictures Senior Vice President of Business Affairs Brian Mawuli Agboh, filed for a divorce in 2016.
