= Ariel Vromen =

American director

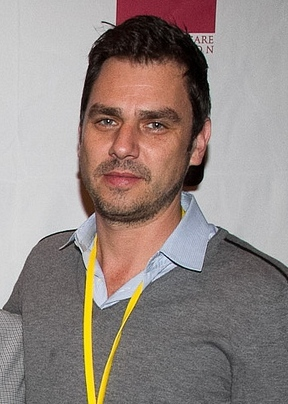
- Born: February 14, 1973 (age 53); Tel Aviv, Israel
- Occupations: Film director; screenwriter; film producer; DJ
- Years active: 2001–present
- Known for: The Iceman (2012); Criminal (2016); The Angel (2018); 1992 (2024)

Ariel Vromen (born February 14, 1973) is an American film director, screenwriter, and producer, best known for directing the 2012 biographical crime film The Iceman. His other feature films include Criminal (2016), the Netflix spy thriller The Angel (2018), and the Los Angeles riots drama 1992 (2024). He is the founder of the Los Angeles-based production company Sumatra Films.

== Early life and education ==
Vromen was born in Tel Aviv and grew up in the Ramat Aviv neighborhood . At age 12, his parents bought him a Bolex Super 8 mm camera, and he began shooting and editing short films with friends.

He completed his military service in the Israeli Air Force's airborne rescue and evacuation Unit 669. After his discharge, he moved to the United Kingdom to study law at the University of Kent while working as a DJ and producing music at a recording studio he opened in London. He later relocated to New York City and, at age 28, enrolled in film studies at New York University and the Los Angeles Film School.

== Career ==
=== Early films (2001–2006) ===
In 2001, Vromen wrote and directed the short film Jewel of the Sahara, starring Gerard Butler. The film screened at several festivals.

Vromen used the funds to make the 2005 romantic thriller Rx (also released as Simple Lies), co-written with Morgan Land and starring Eric Balfour, Colin Hanks, and Lauren German. He followed it with the psychological thriller Danika (2006), starring Marisa Tomei, Craig Bierko, and Regina Hall.

In 2005, Vromen founded Sumatra Films, based in Los Angeles.

=== The Iceman (2012) ===
After watching an HBO documentary about contract killer Richard Kuklinski, Vromen began developing what became The Iceman. He and co-writer Morgan Land based the screenplay on Anthony Bruno's The Iceman: The True Story of a Cold-Blooded Killer and James Thebaut's documentary The Iceman Tapes: Conversations with a Killer. Their research included more than 1,000 pages of Kuklinski's criminal records.

The film starred Michael Shannon as Kuklinski, alongside Winona Ryder, Chris Evans, James Franco, Ray Liotta, David Schwimmer, and Stephen Dorff. It premiered out of competition at the 69th Venice International Film Festival in August 2012 and was released theatrically in the United States in May 2013.

=== Criminal and The Angel (2016–2018) ===
In 2016, Vromen directed the action thriller Criminal, written by Douglas Cook and David Weisberg. The film starred Kevin Costner, Gary Oldman, Tommy Lee Jones, Gal Gadot, Alice Eve, Michael Pitt, and Ryan Reynolds. Distributed by Lionsgate and Summit Entertainment, it follows a death row convict implanted with the memories of a deceased CIA agent. The film grossed about US$38 million worldwide against a budget of US$31.5 million. Also, in 2016, Vromen produced the documentary The Last Shaman, directed by Raz Degan.

In 2017, Netflix acquired the rights to The Angel while it was still in production, reportedly becoming the first Israeli film purchased by the platform before completion. Based on Uri Bar-Joseph's book The Angel: The Egyptian Spy Who Saved Israel, the film tells the story of Ashraf Marwan, the son-in-law of Egyptian president Gamal Abdel Nasser who worked as a Mossad agent before the Yom Kippur War. Starring Marwan Kenzari, Toby Kebbell, and Hannah Ware, it was released worldwide on Netflix in September 2018.

Vromen also served as an executive producer on Rambo: Last Blood (2019).

=== 1992 and later work (2020–present) ===
In 2020, Vromen began the development of The Leader, a six-part miniseries based on The Rabin Memoirs by former Israeli prime minister Yitzhak Rabin and journalist Dov Goldstein. Having grown up two houses away from Rabin's family in Tel Aviv, Vromen described the project as "a mini Israeli The Crown."

In 2021, Vromen directed the Los Angeles riots heist thriller April 29, 1992, later retitled 1992, from a script by Sascha Penn. Set on the first night of the 1992 Los Angeles riots following the Rodney King verdict, the film starred Tyrese Gibson, Scott Eastwood, and Ray Liotta in his final film role. It was distributed by Lionsgate, with Snoop Dogg serving as executive producer through Death Row Pictures. 1992 was released theatrically on August 30, 2024.

In 2024, Vromen reunited with Kevin Costner to direct a long-planned project written by Costner, with production expected to begin in early 2025.

In addition to Sumatra Films, Vromen is a co-founder of EyeMix Visuals, a Los Angeles-based company that uses generative AI to produce Films, TV, and commercials.

In February 2025, Vromen and Solo Avital attracted international attention after U.S. President Donald Trump shared on Truth Social a video they had created as satire. The video depicted the Gaza Strip as a luxury resort featuring a golden statue of Trump. Vromen and Avital later said that the clip had been produced in about eight hours as a satire and a test of the Arcana AI platform.

== Filmography ==
| Year | Title | Director | Writer | Producer | Notes |
|---|---|---|---|---|---|
| 2001 | Jewel of the Sahara | Yes | Yes | | Short film |
| 2005 | Rx | Yes | Yes | | Also known as Simple Lies |
| 2006 | Danika | Yes | | | |
| 2012 | The Iceman | Yes | Yes | Yes | |
| 2016 | Criminal | Yes | | | |
| 2017 | The Last Shaman | | | Yes | Documentary |
| 2018 | The Angel | Yes | | | |
| 2019 | Rambo: Last Blood | | | Yes | Executive producer |
| 2024 | 1992 | Yes | Yes | Yes | |
| 2025 | Trump Gaza | Yes | | | Short video |
