= Ori Pfeffer =

Israeli actor (born 1975)

- אורי פפר
- Born: July 28, 1975 (age 51); Jerusalem, Israel
- Occupation: Actor
- Years active: 2001-present
- Spouse: Yael Goldman (m. 2009)

Ori Pfeffer (Hebrew: אורי פפר; born July 28, 1975) is an Israeli actor with a film and TV career in Israel and the United States.

== Personal life ==
Pfeffer was born in Jerusalem, Israel. In the Israel Defense Forces, he served first at the Golani Brigade then at the Israeli Army Radio.

He married Israeli model and television host Yael Goldman in 2009.

== Filmography ==
=== Film ===
Year	Title	Role	Notes
2001	Shaheed	Hadi	Short
2001	Jewel of the Sahara	Mahmud	Video
2001	Seduced by a Thief	Richie	
2002	Bark!	Thief guy	
2002	Apartment #5C	Uri	
2002	Late	Boyfriend	Short
2004	Shallow Ground	Curtis	
2005	Rx	Raul	
2005	Munich	Andre Spitzer	
2006	Danika	Bank robber #1	
2007	Magnus, Inc.	Magnus	Short
2007	Gardener of Eden	Uri	
2008	You Don't Mess with the Zohan	Second Commander	
2009	Goal III: Taking on the World	Mad film director	
2009	Ultimatum	Yariv	
2010	Holy Rollers	Israeli gangster	
2013	A Strange Course of Events	Saul	
2013	World War Z	Israeli Camp refugee	
2014	Princess as	Michael	
2014	Suicide	Moshe Chechik	
2014	Tubianski	-	
2016	Hacksaw Ridge	Irv Schecter	
2016	As Far as Tomorrow	-	Short
2017	Kimaat Mefursemet	-	
2017	The Hitman's Bodyguard	Vacklin	
2017	The Testament	Yoel	
2017	The Legend of King Solomon	Salim (voice)	
2017	Bullet Head	Handler	
2018	211	Tre	
2018	Noble Savage	Elkayam	
2018	The Angel	Zvi Zamir	
2019	Angel Has Fallen	Agent Murphy	
2019	Jarhead: Law of Return	LtCol. Mizrah	
2019	Full Gas	-	
2020	Eretz HaSheleg	Jonni	
2021	Jolt	Delacroix	
2021	The Protégé	Athens	
2023	Sand Flakes	Michael	
2024	The Bricklayer	Denis Stefanopoulos	
2024	1992	Murphy	
2024	Mary	Joachim	
2026	Monument	Ben Brodesky	
2026	Lucky Strike	Capt. Joachim	

=== Television ===
Year	Title	Role	Notes
2001	NYPD Blue	Jeff Leyritz	Episode: "In-Laws, Outlaws"
2001	CSI: Crime Scene Investigation	Kirk	Episode: "Alter Boys"
2001	Philly	Robert Gonsalvo	Episode: "Prisoner of Love"
2005	Alias	Anthony	Episode: "Mirage"
2006	CSI: NY	Armand Lepompier	Episode: "All Access"
2006–08	Ulai Hapa'am	Mike Dasa	Main Cast
2007	The Unit	Marc Granger	Recurring Cast: Season 3
2008–09	Ha-E	Moses	Recurring Cast: Season 2
2009	Not in Front of the Kids	-	Episode: "Episode #1.1"
2009–10	Meorav Yerushalmi	Avishay	Main Cast: Season 3
2009–10	Gerushim Niflaim	Amit Rubin	Recurring Cast: Season 1–2
2010–14	Yellow Peppers	Avishai Rotenberg	Main Cast
2011	Naor's Friends	Udi Kattash	Episode: "Passive Aggressive"
2012	New York	Dagan	Recurring Cast: Season 1
2012	Hatufim	Noni's Father	Episode: "Lehitraot Matok"
2014	Shovrei Galim	Udi Kattash	Main Cast
2015	Suspect	Moshe	Main Cast
2015	Dig	Detective Golan Cohen	Main Cast
2016	Mama's Angel	Sharon Sagi	Main Cast
2017	Lehiyot Ita	Yair Altman	Recurring Cast: Season 2
2016–19	Little Monsters	Amir	Main Cast
2018–21	PMTA	Elisha Bar-On	Main Cast
2019	The Spy	Arik	Main Cast
2020	Messiah	Alon	Recurring Cast
2021	Rising	Charles Darcy	Recurring Cast: Season 2
2026	Rokdim Im Kokhavim	Himself	Contestant (Season 12)
