= ROTG =

ROTG may refer to:

- Rise of the Gargoyles, a 2009 horror television film
- Rise of the Guardians, a 2012 fantasy film
