= Julian Corbett =

British naval historian and geostrategist (1854–1922)

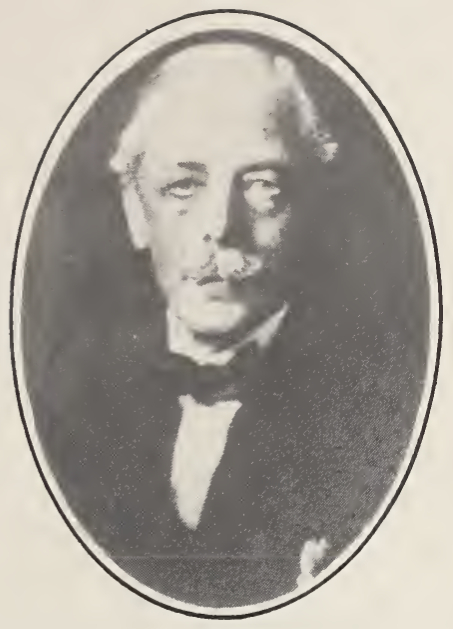
Sir Julian Stafford Corbett

Sir Julian Stafford Corbett (12 November 1854 at Walcot House, Kennington Road, Lambeth – 21 September 1922 at Manor Farm, Stopham, Pulborough, Sussex) was a prominent British naval historian and geostrategist of the late 19th and early 20th centuries, whose works helped shape the Royal Navy's reforms of that era. One of his most famous works is Some Principles of Maritime Strategy, which remains a classic among students of naval warfare. Corbett was a good friend and ally of naval reformer Admiral John "Jacky" Fisher, the First Sea Lord. He was chosen to write the official history of British naval operations during World War I.

== Early life and education ==
The son of a London architect and property developer, Charles Joseph Corbett, who owned among other properties Imber Court at Weston Green, Thames Ditton, where he made the family home, Julian Corbett was educated at Marlborough College (1869–73) and at Trinity College, Cambridge (1873–76), where he took a first class honours degree in law. Corbett became a barrister at Middle Temple in 1877 and practised until 1882 when he turned to writing as a career. Fascinated by the Elizabethan period, he first wrote historical novels set in this era. He became a correspondent for the Pall Mall Gazette, and reported on the Dongola Expedition in 1896. Corbett came to naval history in mid-life and from a civilian background. He was a man of independent means who traveled extensively.

Julian Corbett had four brothers, Charles Joseph Henry (1853-1935), Herbert Edwin (1858–1937), Frank Edmund (1863–1912) and Edward Montague (1870–1954). In 1899 he married Edith Alexander, daughter of George Alexander. They had one son and one daughter.

== Career as a naval historian ==
In 1896 Corbett accepted John Knox Laughton's request to edit a volume of documents on the Spanish war, 1585–87 which served as the start of his career as a naval historian. He soon became known as one of the Royal Navy's leading intellectuals, and from 1901 to 1922 was writing regularly on naval history and strategy. In 1902 he began lecturing at the Royal Naval College, founded in 1900. In 1903 he gave the Ford Lectures in English History at Oxford University. In 1905 he became the Admiralty's chief unofficial strategic adviser and served as secretary of the Cabinet Historical Office. He was awarded the Chesney Gold Medal in 1914, and knighted in 1917.

== Work ==
Like his American contemporary, Rear Admiral Alfred Thayer Mahan of the U.S. Navy, Corbett saw naval warfare as part of a nation's larger policies. In this respect, Prussian military thinker Carl von Clausewitz was an important influence on his work. Another major influence was John Knox Laughton, arguably the first naval historian, and Corbett has been described as his 'protégé'. Corbett differed from Mahan, however, in placing less emphasis on fleet battle. This stance angered many officers in the Royal Navy, who believed such a view lacked the heroic aspect of Lord Nelson's strategy in the Napoleonic Wars.

Corbett's primary objective was to fill the void in British naval doctrine by formalizing the theories and principles of naval warfare. The strategies of naval warfare by Corbett focused on the art of naval warfare and defined the differences between land warfare and naval warfare. He set the initial focus towards the employment of manoeuvre type doctrine. Corbett's principles of sea control, focus on the enemy, and manoeuvre for tactical advantage form the foundation of today's naval manoeuvre warfare.

Corbett was working from within the naval community and trying to influence the naval establishment. He believed in studying and developing the theory of war for educational purposes, which he felt established a "common vehicle of expression and a common plane of thought… for the sake of mental solidarity between a chief and his subordinates". Through his lectures at the Naval War College, Corbett was trying to convey to the attending flag officers his ideas of limited war and strategic defence which were very different from the accepted norms of naval theory and strategy of the time. Through his publication of Some Principles of Maritime Strategy (1911), Corbett was trying to expand the audience for his strategies and teachings to include the general public.

== Historical context of Corbett's work ==
At the turn of the century Corbett emerged as one of the first authors in the development of modern naval doctrine. Drawing from the influences of Baron de Jomini and Carl von Clausewitz, he was instrumental in attempting to apply the existing theories of land warfare for war at sea. Clausewitz's On War was an invaluable basis and stimulus for Corbett's theoretical work, but it was not his blueprint. For example, Corbett did not hesitate to take issue with Clausewitz, Jomini, or other continental strategists on the importance of the search for the decisive battle and the principle of concentration. The fact that Corbett believed these factors to be far less relevant at sea was a daring departure from the accepted wisdom of his time. In developing his theory of limited war, Corbett again used On War as his point of departure but ended up with his own, unique method of waging a limited war in a maritime environment.

== Corbett's views about war ==
Corbett offered no general theory of warfare at sea. Instead, he focused his thoughts on the nature of maritime strategy and what naval warfare meant to the power of a nation. While many theorists of naval warfare tried to mechanically adapt land warfare concepts to the maritime environment, Corbett countered that the interests and requirements of naval warfare differed in fundamental ways from those of land warfare.

Corbett felt that protecting lines of communication was much more difficult to enforce at sea than on land. This difficulty was the physical geographical differences of the sea and land. Because of these physical differences, Corbett analysed naval warfare in its own terms, having its own unique characteristics. Corbett stated that you cannot conquer the sea because it is not susceptible to ownership. This led to Corbett's most important contribution to the early theories of naval warfare. What mattered most was not Mahan's concept of physical destruction of the enemy, but the act of passage on the sea. To Corbett, command of the sea was a relative and not an absolute which could be categorised as general or local, temporary or permanent. Corbett defined the two fundamental methods of obtaining control of the lines of communication as the actual physical destruction or capture of enemy warships and merchants, and or a naval blockade. Today, this concept is defined as sea control.

Corbett was not infatuated with the search for the decisive battle or with the need for the strategic offensive. In general, he favoured the strategic defensive, with an emphasis on the offensive at the operational level. Corbett's strategic defence advocated such measures as an intense local offensive, the projection of land forces, various types of blockades, and raids on enemy trade routes. Moreover, Corbett recognised that once the enemy has been sufficiently weakened on sea and on land, the shift to the strategic offensive should not be delayed.

Corbett did not believe that the concentration of naval forces at sea was the highest and simplest law of strategy. On the contrary, he observed that the principle of concentration had become "a kind of shibboleth" that had done more harm than good. The principle of concentration is "a truism—no one would dispute it. As a canon of practical strategy, it is untrue". Corbett felt that superior concentration thus not only deterred the weaker opponent from seeking battle but presented him with an opportunity to attack his enemy's exposed national lines of communication. Corbett felt that superior concentration of naval forces created yet another serious problem. The greater the concentration of a fleet, the more difficult it was to conceal its whereabouts and movements.

In the process of adapting Clausewitz's theory to the unique circumstances of naval warfare, Corbett developed his own innovative theory of limited war in maritime strategy. The first of his two main points was that in wartime conditions on the continent, as opposed to those in the maritime and imperial environment, wars were fought mostly between adjacent states. Corbett's second point was that in wars between contiguous continental states "there will be no strategical obstacle to his [the enemy's] being able to use his whole force". In other words, the nature of continental war makes it difficult to limit political aims, because one or both states are able to use all of the means at their disposal to protect the inevitably threatened vital interests. As Corbett demonstrated, this means that the conditions for the ideal limited war exist only in maritime warfare and can only be exploited by the preponderant naval power: "… limited war is only permanently possible to island Powers or between Powers which are separated by sea, and then only when the Power desiring limited war is able to command the sea to such a degree as to be able not only to isolate the distant object, but also to render impossible the invasion of his home territory."

Like Clausewitz, Corbett shared a belief in the primacy of politics in war and in devising an appropriate strategy to protect the national interests. However, Corbett was interested in the diplomatic alliance systems and coalitions formed before and during a war, and he was concerned with the economic and financial dimensions of waging war as well as with the technological and material aspects of war, which were of no interest to Clausewitz.

== Works of enduring value ==
Corbett's value for today's military professional lies in four of his concepts:

1. controlling lines of communications, focus on the enemy, and manoeuvre for tactical advantage;
2. the aspects of political, economic and financial dimensions of waging war as well as with the technological and material aspects of war;
3. the primacy of politics in war and in devising an appropriate strategy to protect the national interests, and
4. the emphasis on efficiency in battle while preserving costly assets.

However, his concept of limited war on isolated countries or nation states most likely would be very difficult to achieve with today's political and economic intricacies between nations in conjunction with current technologies on a symmetric battlefield. However, they could still be applied on an asymmetric battlefield with success.

== Writing about Corbett ==
Beyond the University of London's annual award of the Julian Corbett Prize in Naval History, the importance of Corbett's contribution to British naval history was largely overlooked until Professor D. M. Schurman published his pioneering work on The Education of a Navy: The Development of British Naval Strategic Thought, 1867–1914 (1965). In 1981, Schurman went on to write a full-length biography of Corbett. Further work on Corbett appeared with John Hattendorf's essay "Sir Julian Corbett on the Significance of Naval History" (1971, reprinted 2000) and Goldrick and Hattendorf's Conference Proceedings, Mahan is Not Enough (1993), followed by the revised biography on Corbett in The Oxford Dictionary of National Biography (2004).

These works were complemented by Eric J. Grove's definitive, annotated edition of Corbett's Some Principles of Maritime Strategy (Classics of Sea Power series, U.S. Naval Institute Press, 1988), which included Corbett's previously unpublished "Green Pamphlet" on strategical terms. In addition, D. M. Schurman and John Hattendorf edited and wrote an introduction to Corbett's previously unpublished official study Maritime Operations in the Russo-Japanese War, 1904–1905 (U.S. Naval Institute, 1994).

== Published works ==
Novels:

- The Fall of Asgard, 1886
- For God and Gold (London: Macmillan, 1887) read online
- Kophetua the Thirteenth (London: Macmillan, 1889) read online
- A Business in Great Waters (London: Methuen, 1895) read online

Historical:

- Monk (London: Macmillan, 1889) English Men of Action series read online
- Francis Drake (London: Macmillan, 1890) English Men of Action series read online
- Papers Relating to the Navy During the Spanish War, 1585–1587 (Navy Records Society, 1898) read online
- Drake and the Tudor Navy, With a History of the Rise of England as a Naval Power (London: Longmans, Green and Company, 1898) read online
- The Successors of Drake (London: Longmans, Green and Company, 1900) read online
- England in the Mediterranean: A Study of the Rise and Influence of British Power within the Straits, 1603–1713 (London: Longmans, Green and Company, 1904) read online
- Fighting Instructions: 1530–1816 (London: Navy Records Society Vol. XXIX, 1905) read online
- England in the Seven Years' War (London: Longmans, Green and Company, 1907) read online
- Some Neglected Aspects of War / by Captain A. T. Mahan...together with The power that makes for peace, by Henry S. Pritchett...and The capture of private property at sea, by Julian S. Corbett (Boston: Little, Brown and Company, 1907) read online
- Signals and Instructions: 1776–1794, (London: Navy Records Society, Vol. XXV, 1909) read online
- The Campaign of Trafalgar (London: Longmans, Green and Company, 1910) read online
- Some Principles of Maritime Strategy (London: Longmans, Green and Company, 1911) read online
- Private Papers of George, Second Earl Spencer, First Lord of the Admiralty, 1794–1801 (2 vols.) (London: Navy Records Society, 1914) review
- The Spectre of Navalism (London: Darling & Son, 1915) read online
- The League of Peace and a Free Sea (London: Hodder & Stoughton, 1917) read online
- The League of Nations and Freedom of the Seas (London: Oxford University Press, 1918)
- History of the Great War Naval Operations, Based on Official Documents (London: Longmans, Green and Company), vol. 1 April 1920, vol. 2 November 1921, but Corbett died before agreeing final corrections to vol. 3, which was published in 1923. For vol. 1 and vol. 3 there is an accompanying maps volume. read vol. 1 online vol. 2 online
- Maritime Operations in the Russo-Japanese War 1904–05 (2 vols.) (Originally classified secret, first published for public release in 1994.)

== Bibliography ==
- Corbett, Julian Stafford; Edwards, H.J., eds. (1914). Naval and Military Essays: Being Papers Read in the Naval and Military Section at the International Congress of Historical Studies, 1913. Cambridge University Press. (reissued by Cambridge University Press, 2009; ISBN 978-1-108-00349-0).
- Michael I. Handel, "Corbett, Clausewitz, and Sun Tzu." Naval War College Review (Autumn 2000). pp. 106–23. Naval War College. 24 September 2004.
- Julian S. Corbett, Some Principles of Maritime Strategy. Classics of Seapower series. Annapolis, MD: Naval Institute Press, 1988.
- Julian S. Corbett, Maritime Operations in the Russo-Japanese War, 1904–05. (1994)
