= Anissa Hassouna =

Egyptian politician (1953–2022)

- أنيسة حسونة
- Born: 22 January 1953; Cairo, Egypt
- Died: 13 March 2022 (aged 69)
- Education: Cairo University
- Occupation: Member of the Egyptian Parliament
- Years active: 2009–2022
- Notable work: "Bedoon Sabeq Enzar" (Without Prior Warning)
- Spouse: Sherif Nagy
- Father: Essam Eldin Hassouna

Anissa Hassouna (22 January 1953 – 13 March 2022) was an Egyptian politician who was a member of the Egyptian Parliament. Hassouna served as secretary-general of the Egyptian Council for Foreign Affairs and executive-director of the Magdi Yacoub Foundation. She graduated from Cairo University with a degree in political science and lived in Cairo, Egypt.

In 2014, Arabian Business and CEO Middle East Magazine named Hassouna one of the World's 100 Most Powerful Arab Women. Her bestselling memoir, Bedoon Sabeq Enzar (Without Prior Warning), describes her recurrent battle with cancer. Her book inspired many readers throughout the Middle East and motivated her to speak on World Cancer Day 2018, reminding individuals that cancer is an emotional and psychological battle, as well as a medical one.

== Early life ==
Anissa Hassouna was born in 1953 in Cairo, Egypt. As a child she first attended the Coptic Church school in Asyut, then a school in Beni Suef, and ended prep school in Port Said, all government schooling. Finishing school in Cairo, she placed sixth on the final exam for the republic.

== Career ==
=== Magdi Yacoub Foundation (2009–2016) ===
Anissa Hassouna began her career in 2009 when she joined the Magdi Yacoub Foundation and became the executive-director. The Magdi Yacoub Global Heart Foundation was founded in 2008 and provides free cardiac care to children in Egypt and the broader Middle East and Africa. After holding her position for seven years, Hassouna left in 2016 to serve as a member of the Egyptian Parliament.

=== Egyptian Parliament (2016–2022) ===
In 2016, Hassouna was appointed by Egyptian President Abdel Fattah al-Sisi to the Egyptian parliament. As a member of parliament, she advocated for basic human rights for Egyptian citizens, free religious speech and sermons, and reforms within education and culture.

==== Women ====
One of her main focuses was women's equality and as a member of the Arab International Women's Forum in London and the Think Tank for Arab Women, she supported women who are the head of the families. Hassouna aimed to pass laws that fund and provide training for women who want to start their own small businesses as well as be able to earn a living wage.

==== Children ====
Not only does Hassouna focus on women's rights, she also spoke about rights for children. In 2018, Hassouna requested the Egyptian parliament create playgrounds for children, free of charge for every district. She focused on the impact of children's learning and development through playgrounds and toys.

==== Plastic ====
In 2019, Hassouna suggested that current Prime Minister, Mostafa Madbouly, create a law that would ban the use of plastic bags. Along with House of Representatives member, Tarek Metwali, they agreed that plastic bags harm coral reefs and marine life. In 2019, Egypt banned throwing plastic bags on Hurghada's beaches, but Hassouna suggested more needed to be done to protect the beaches and wildlife living there, along with advising the public about the dangers of plastic bags.

=== Writing ===
Hassouna published her own book titled "Bedoon Sabeq Enzar," quickly becoming a bestseller in Egypt for two months. The memoir revealed that she had been suffering from cancer. She describes her motivation for moving forward with cancer treatment and how it affected her as a woman. Her book not only describes her experience with cancer, but she also describes how women can still feel feminine after losing their hair.

== Personal life ==
Hassouna was married to Sherif Nagy, an Egyptian businessman.

In 2017, Hassouna was diagnosed with cancer. Receiving treatment in Germany, she underwent a surgery that had a ten-day recovery period. After suffering severe side effects, Hassouna ended up spending 42 days at the hospital. After the surgery, Hassouna also received chemotherapy and radiation therapy, but was not fully cured.

She died on 13 March 2022, at the age of 69.

Four days before her death, Hassouna was honoured by President Abdel Fattah El-Sisi's wife, Intisar El-Sisi, during the Women's International Day celebration.
