= Second Hand (2005 film) =

- Poster
- Directed by: Dan Pița
- Starring: Mihai Călin; Alexandra Dinu
- Distributed by: Media Pro Pictures
- Release date: 2005
- Country: Romania
- Language: Romanian

Second Hand is a 2005 Romanian film directed by Dan Pița.

== Plot summary ==
The film's plot surrounds the romantic involvement of two contrasting characters: Petre (Mihai Călin), a Mafioso, and Andreea (Alexandra Dinu), a young violin player. The pair meet and fall in love, but when Andreea rejects Petre's sexual advances, he becomes obsessed with her and threatens her with violence.

== Cast ==
- Mihai Călin as Petre
- Alexandra Dinu as Andreea
- Adina Andrei as Mona
- Răzvan Oprea as Marian
- Bogdan Dumitrescu
- Cătălin Neamṭu
- Adina Petras
- Laura Vasilescu
- Răzvan Vasilescu

The film also features Răzvan Oprea as Marian, a street thug and close acquaintance of Petre. Marian repeatedly commits crime on behalf of Petre. Both Oprea and Călin are actors within the National Theater in Bucharest.
