= 211 (film) =

2018 film by York Shackleton

- Theatrical release poster
- Directed by: York Shackleton
- Screenplay by: John Rebus
- Based on: A screenplay by York Shackleton
- Produced by: Isaac Florentine; Jeffrey Greenstein; Avi Lerner; Les Weldon; Jonathan Yunger
- Starring: Nicolas Cage; Dwayne Cameron; Alexandra Dinu; Michael Rainey Jr.; Sophie Skelton; Ori Pfeffer
- Cinematography: Alexander Krumov
- Edited by: Ivan Todorov
- Music by: Frederik Wiedmann
- Production company: Millennium Films
- Distributed by: Momentum Pictures
- Release date: June 8, 2018
- Running time: 86 minutes
- Country: United States
- Language: English
- Box office: $1.1 million

211 (released in some territories as Code 211 or The Bank Heist) is a 2018 American crime action film directed by York Shackleton and written by John Rebus, based on a screenplay by Shackleton. The film stars Nicolas Cage, Dwayne Cameron, Alexandra Dinu, Michael Rainey Jr., Sophie Skelton and Ori Pfeffer. Very loosely based on the 1997 North Hollywood shootout, the plot follows a policeman and a teenager who are locked in a violent shootout with heavily armed bank robbers.

Filming began in Bulgaria on February 27, 2018 and concluded on April 27, 2018. "211" refers to the California Penal Code for robbery, although the film is set in Massachusetts, which does not use that number.

211 was released on June 8, 2018, by Momentum Pictures. It earned $1.1 million at the box office and received mostly negative reviews.

== Plot ==
In Afghanistan, disgruntled and ruthless mercenaries Tre, Rob, Luke, and Hyde torture a war profiteer who owes them money. Before they kill him, he discloses it has been wired to a bank in the city of Chesterford, Massachusetts. Interpol Agent Rossi is reassigned from an operation in Kabul to investigate the mercenaries.

In Chesterford, quiet high school student Kenny Ralston is suspended for fighting off a bully. The school's vice principal informs Kenny's mother, emergency department nurse Shawnee Ralston, that Kenny must go on a police ride-along or face expulsion. Kenny is assigned to Chesterford Police Department Officer Mike Chandler and his son-in-law Officer Steve MacAvoy. Mike, a widower whose relationship with his daughter Lisa is deteriorating, learns from Steve that Lisa is pregnant. Kenny and the officers do not get along, and Kenny records an incident where the officers hold a suspect at gunpoint, frustrating Mike, who feels people who record police are obstructing their duties.

Elsewhere, the mercenaries prepare to rob the Chesterford bank for the wired money, worth $1.3 million. Hyde plants an IED in a diner elsewhere in Chesterford to provide a diversion, and the mercenaries rob the bank, taking numerous hostages.

While on a coffee break nearby, Mike notices an illegally parked SUV outside the bank. Tre and Hyde detonate the IED, destroying the diner. The Chesterford PD dispatches all available units to the explosion, issuing Captain Horst situational command, and Shawnee's hospital prepares to receive casualties, while Rossi is ordered to assist the Chesterford PD. However, Mike, having warmed up to Kenny, chooses to stay in their beat and keep him around, to Steve's chagrin.

Agitated at Mike and Steve's refusal to leave, Hyde opens fire on their cruiser, forcing it to crash. Steve calls for backup and rescues Kenny, and the officers return fire and kill Hyde while Kenny attempts to record the shootout. Mike learns Steve is injured and prepares a makeshift tourniquet. Meanwhile, Rossi arrives in Chesterford as police begin to divert their attention to the robbery.

Backup arrives, including Officers Hanson and Jacobs and attempts to medevac Steve, but the robbers shoot numerous hostages, bystanders, and officers, including Jacobs. Steve, fearing he will die, asks Kenny to record a farewell message for Lisa. Backup eventually manages to extract Steve, but Kenny is separated from Mike in the bank's parking lot.

At the hospital, Shawnee and EMTs treat the casualties from the diner and the bank, including Steve and Jacobs. Lisa arrives at the hospital and learns from Jacobs that Mike is still at the scene looking for Kenny; Shawnee overhears their conversation and begins to worry just as Kenny calls to tell her he is safe.

By now, a massive police presence has formed at the bank, including the Massachusetts State Police, Chesterford PD SWAT, Horst, and Rossi. As Mike and Hanson head to the parking lot to search for Kenny, Tre releases the hostages; however, Horst finds an IED in a hostage's pocket and sacrifices himself to protect others from the blast. With the hostages secured, SWAT assaults the bank but are repelled by the robbers. Rob and Luke charge out to battle the police but are killed while Tre escapes into the parking lot and fires on Kenny and the officers, killing Hanson and injuring Mike. As Tre prepares to execute Mike, Kenny pulls Hanson's sidearm just as Rossi arrives, and both shoot and kill Tre. Mike and Kenny are extracted from the scene and are met by Lisa and Shawnee.

One year later, Mike arrives home to a birthday party held for him by his friends and family, including Steve, Lisa, Kenny, and Mike’s new granddaughter. As he joins the celebrations, he asks Kenny to take pictures for him.

== Cast ==
- Nicolas Cage as Mike Chandler
- Dwayne Cameron as Steve MacAvoy
- Alexandra Dinu as Agent Rossi
- Michael Rainey Jr. as Kenny Ralston
- Sophie Skelton as Lisa MacAvoy
- Shari Watson as Shawnee Ralston
- Ori Pfeffer as Tre
- Sean James as Rob
- Weston Cage as Luke
- Michael Bellisario as Hyde
- Cory Hardrict as Officer Hanson
- Sapir Azulay as Officer Jacobs
- Jonathan Yunger as Officer Delaney
- Atanas Srebrev as Captain Horst
- Amanda Cerny as Sarah
- Velizar Binev as Randall
- Bashar Rahal as Major Rahimi
- Evgeniya Marinkova as Eleanor
- George Zlatarev as Lt. Col. Moss
- Nadejda Ivanova as Natalia Buskova
- Velislav Pavlov as Carl Fisk
- Aaron Cohen as Lieutenant
- Naum Shopov as Dr. Metcalf
- Laura Giosh Markova as Judith
- Pavel Vladimirov as Officer Owens

== Production ==
On January 27, 2017, Nicolas Cage joined the cast of the film. Filming took place at Nu Boyana Film Studios in Sofia, Bulgaria.

== Release ==
The film was released on June 8, 2018, by Momentum Pictures.

== Reception ==
=== Critical response ===
The film review aggregator website Rotten Tomatoes rates it 4% positive based on 24 reviews with an overall rating of 2.5/10. The website's critics consensus reads: "211's disjointed assortment of action clichés and uninspired set pieces adds up to roughly zero." Metacritic reports an aggregate score of 21 out of 100 based on 8 critics, indicating "generally unfavorable" reviews.

Luke Y. Thompson of Forbes gave it a fresh rating, writing “I can’t begrudge you waiting until 211 shows up on a Blu-ray at Walmart that also contains ten other Cage movies... But I can tell you that when it does, you shouldn't skip over this one.”

Other reviewers were not as complimentary. Jacob Knight from Birth Movies Death declared it rotten, writing, “Nic Cage’s latest DTV action endeavour is a bizarre slog.” Richard Roeper of the Chicago Sun-Times gave it 2/4 and wrote, "A muddled, overcrowded, trigger-happy heist movie brimming with clichés while constantly trying our patience." Glenn Kenny of RogerEbert.com gave it 1/4, describing it as "This effort is a cavalcade of crap. Loud crap." Frank Scheck of The Hollywood Reporter wrote, "It's probably foolish to wish that Nicolas Cage would once again make movies as good as Adaptation and Leaving Las Vegas. But is it too much to ask that he go back to the comparative glory days of Con Air and The Rock?" Dennis Harvey of Variety wrote, "Unsurprisingly, the director doesn't get very good work from a cast asked primarily to ramp up the intensity on stereotypes."
