= Yael Goldman =

Israeli television host, actress and model

Yael Goldman יעל גולדמן
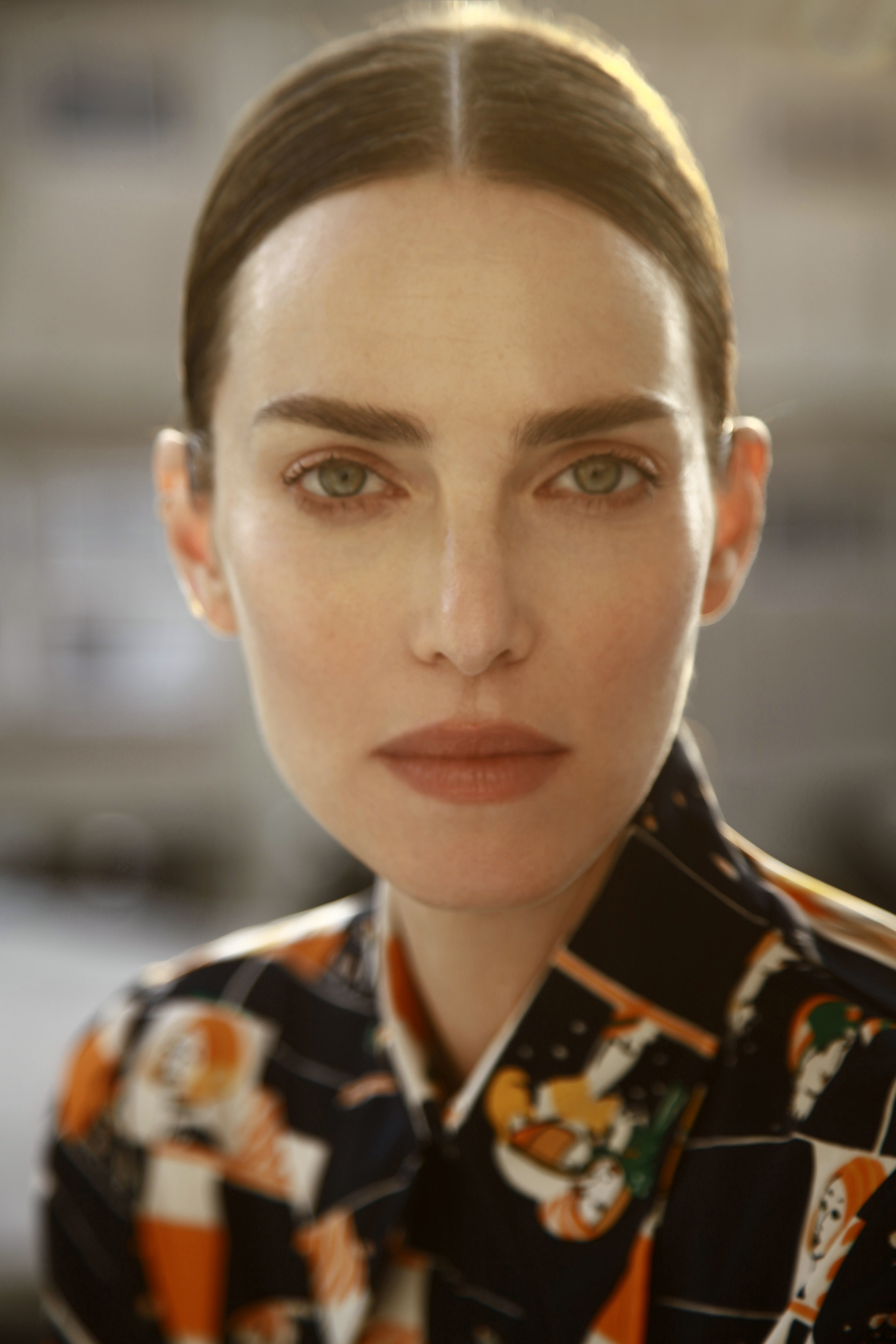
- Goldman in 2020
- Born: Yael Goldman; 24 September 1978 (age 48); Kiryat Ono, Israel
- Spouse: Ori Pfeffer (m. 2009)
- Children: 3
- Modeling information
- Height: 5 ft 9 in (175 cm)
- Hair color: Dark brown
- Eye color: Light green

Yael Goldman-Pfeffer (Hebrew: יעל גולדמן-פפר; born 24 September 1978) is an Israeli television host, actress, and model.

== Early life ==
Yael Goldman was born in Kiryat Ono, Israel. Both her parents Dan Goldman and Idit (née Fishler) are of Ashkenazi Jewish descent. She served as a soldier in the Intelligence Corps of the Israel Defense Forces.

In 2005 Goldman began studying business management at the College of Management in Rishon LeZion near Tel Aviv.

Between 2006 and 2008, Goldman studied at the Yoram Loewenstein Performing Arts Studio.

== Career ==
=== Modeling ===
After finishing her military service, Goldman began her modeling career in 1998, modeling for the Betty Rockaway modeling agency. Through the years she has modeled in Paris and New York City, in magazines, participated in a Bourgeois campaign (subsidiary of Chanel), and campaigns for Galeries Lafayette, Armani and McDonald's. At the same time, In Israel Goldman became the leading model of the Israel-based clothing company Crocker and in 2000 was chosen to be the leading model of the Israel-based clothing company Castro.

In 2004 Goldman was chosen to model in the hair products campaign of the Israeli shampoo Natural Formula after the company did a survey in which 14,000 people chose her. In the beginning of 2005 Goldman was chosen to be the leading model of the jewelry company H. Stern and later on her contract with the company was extended for another year. As part of her work for H. Stern she modeled along with Kate Moss. In addition, in 2005, Goldman was the leading model for the fashion company Bonita and led its campaign for two years.

In 2008 Goldman was chosen to be the new model of the Sebocalm company instead of Michal Yanai. In 2008 Goldman participated in the campaign for the Boutique Cassidy.

In February 2010 Goldman was selected as the presenter of the fashion designer Maya Negri for the spring-summer season of 2010.

=== Television ===
At the end of 2002 Goldman returned to Israel, and in January 2003 began her television career as a TV host of the Israel daily teenager show Exit on Channel 10, along with model Mali Levi, the singer Shiri Maimon and the TV hosts Ofer Shechter and Michael Hanegbi. In April 2005, on the show, Goldman announced her plans to leave the show.

In July 2005 Goldman began to host the extreme TV sports program AXN Mania. During that year Goldman also participated in a videoclip of the singers Daniel Salomon and Rinat Bar.

In April 2006 Goldman accompanied the participants of the fourth season of the Israeli reality show Kokhav Nolad during all stages of auditions, and in June of that year, Goldman participated in the show Once in a Lifetime along with Yaakov Alperon.

In May 2007 Goldman joined the cast of the Israeli science fiction series Ha'Nephilim in which she played a journalist. During the autumn of that year she appeared in the video clip of the song "You Come to Me" by Harel Moyal. At the end of 2007 Goldman became a leading reporter in the Israeli entertainment news program Y at Ten, and appeared in the Israeli drama series Danny Hollywood.

In 2009 Goldman played in the second season of the Israeli comedy series Naor's Friends as herself, and in the summer of that year she began hosting a daily television program on Channel 24 which was broadcast live from Akhziv. At the end of that year she was cast in a lead role in the Israeli drama Neshot Htayasim of Channel 10.

In 2010 Goldman became the host of the variety TV show Y in the Evening alongside Ilana Berkovitz and Zohar Israel. In June 2010 she began to appear regularly on the panel of the network's coverage of the 2010 FIFA World Cup.

=== Other professional avenues ===
While hosting the show Exit, Goldman was also employed as an assistant veterinarian.

== Personal life ==
On 18 June 2009 married Israeli actor Ori Pfeffer. They have 3 children.
