= Ashraf Marwan =

Egyptian businessman and spy (1944–2007)

- أشرف مروان
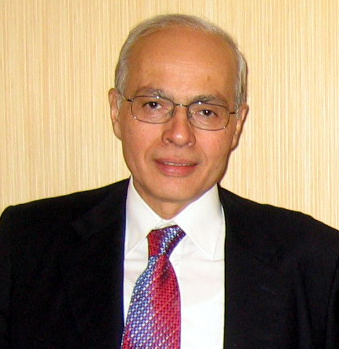
- Born: Mohamed Ashraf Abu El Wafa Marwan; 2 February 1944; Cairo, Egypt
- Died: 27 June 2007 (aged 63); London, England
- Occupations: Diplomat and Businessman
- Known for: Alerting Israel in 1973 war
- Spouse: Mona Gamal Abdel Nasser
- Children: 2
- Relatives: Gamal Abdel Nasser (father-in-law); Tahia Abdel Nasser (mother-in-law); Khalid Abdel Nasser (brother-in-law); Abdel Hakim Abdel Nasser (brother-in-law); Hoda Gamal Abdel Nasser (sister-in-law)

Mohamed Ashraf Abu El Wafa Marwan, known as Ashraf Marwan (Arabic: أشرف مروان 2 February 1944 – 27 June 2007), was an Egyptian official who was alleged to have spied for the Mossad, though former Egyptian president Hosni Mubarak later denied the claim. Other accounts contend that he served as a double agent for Egypt, providing misleading information to Israel.

From 1969 on, Marwan worked at the Presidential Office, first under Gamal Abdel Nasser and then as a close aide to his successor, Anwar Sadat. In the lead-up to the Yom Kippur War in 1973, Marwan provided information to Israel.

In the 1980s, Marwan moved to London, where he became an arms dealer. He died under mysterious circumstances on June 27, 2007, after falling from the balcony of his house in London. His wife and relatives testified that before his death, he expressed concerns that he was being followed.

== Early life and education ==
Marwan was born on February 2, 1944, in the Manshiyat al-Bakri neighborhood of Cairo, Egypt. His grandfather was the chief of the Sharia courts in Egypt, and his father, a military officer, reached the rank of major general in the Egyptian military, with a final assignment as deputy commander of the Republican Guard. Marwan's mother belonged to the prominent al-Fayyad family.

Marwan graduated from Kubri al-Quba High School on the science track. In 1965, Marwan graduated from Cairo University, where he was part of a military officer training program; after graduating with a degree in chemical engineering, he began working in Egypt's military industry with the rank of second lieutenant. That year, at the age of 21, he met Mona Nasser, the president's second daughter, who was 17 at the time, at the Heliopolis Sporting Club. She fell in love with him, but her father suspected that Marwan's interest in his daughter stemmed more from her political status than her charms. Nasser agreed to the marriage, which took place in July 1966, under her pressure.

Marwan's marriage accelerated his rise within the Egyptian elite. In 1968, Marwan started working in the Presidential Office under Sami Sharaf, Nasser's aide-de-camp and the strongman of the Egyptian security service, who kept an eye on him. In late 1968, Marwan, Mona, and their newborn son, Gamal, left for London, allegedly for the continuation of Marwan's studies. A few months later, Nasser, who was irritated by information concerning their lavish lifestyle, ordered the young couple to return to Egypt, where Marwan continued working under Sami Sharaf.

== Career ==
Marwan's service at the Presidential Office lasted eight years (1968–1976). Although he held only a junior position under Nasser, the president occasionally used him for sensitive missions, such as calming the crisis that erupted after the resignation of General Saad el-Shazly from the army in response to his rival's nomination as chief of staff.

=== Lead-up to the 1973 Arab-Israeli War ===
Egypt had begun preparing a war to retake the Sinai Peninsula, which it had lost to Israel during the Six-Day War in 1967. Marwan became an intelligence asset to Israel, offering his services as a "walk-in" to the Israeli embassy in London in 1969. Initially turned down, Israeli intelligence recruited him as a source in 1970. Mossad referred to him as "the source" and gave him the codenames Angel and Babylon.

Marwan continued to provide information to Israeli intelligence in London after Nasser's death and the rise of Anwar Sadat. He became part of Sadat's inner circle. Marwan's unparalleled access to his nation's best-kept secrets, especially after his promotion in May 1971, allowed him to provide Israel with information about the coming Yom Kippur War (1973), including detailed accounts of Egyptian war plans and military exercises, original documentation of Egypt's arms deals with the Soviet Union and other countries, the Egyptian military Order of Battle, the minutes from meetings of the high command, accounts of Sadat's private conversations with other Arab leaders, and even the minutes of secret summit meetings in Moscow between Sadat and Soviet leader Leonid Brezhnev. The information that Marwan provided made its way to the desks of Israeli Prime Minister Golda Meir, Defense Minister Moshe Dayan, and Israeli Defense Force Chief of Staff Chaim Bar-Lev in raw form. Meir shared the intelligence about the Sadat–Brezhnev meeting with U.S. President Richard Nixon and his top advisor Henry Kissinger. Despite the valuable information provided by Marwan over several years, some within Israeli intelligence questioned the truth of the information he provided; Zvi Zamir, the director of Mossad, reassured Meir that Marwan was legitimate.

Marwan's role as an Israeli asset was revealed in 2002. Uri Bar-Joseph, a scholar of the Yom Kippur War, regards Marwan as the most valuable Israeli human intelligence asset during the war period. While the Israelis had other intelligence sources in Egypt at the time, Marwan was apparently the most highly placed.

Some, most notably Eli Zeira in his memoirs and researcher Ahron Bregman, had previously posited that Marwan was a double agent who fed the Israelis misleading information as part of an Egyptian deception campaign. (Bregman wrote a book on his relationship with Marwan, The Spy Who Fell to Earth). However, subsequent work by Bar-Joseph in the 2010s established that Marwan was a genuine spy for Mossad. Bar-Joseph's 2016 book on Marwan, entitled The Angel: The Egyptian Spy Who Saved Israel, was later the basis for a Netflix film, The Angel (2018). In a review of the book in the CIA's Studies in Intelligence, Thomas G. Coffey wrote that the book persuasively "argues that the nature of the intelligence Marwan gave the Israelis was simply too destructive of Egyptian interests" for Marwan to have been a double agent and that it offers "a convincing defense" against the claim that the intelligence he provided was "late, flawed, and of little practical use". In a 2022 interview, former Egyptian major general Liwa Mohammed Rashad, who was the head of the Israeli department of Egyptian military intelligence from 1966 to 1978, acknowledged that Marwan was not a double agent, and had spied for Israel for "basically financial" reasons.

In 2025 an Israeli investigation published in Yedioth Ahronoth and Ynet, based on previously unseen intelligence files, reignited the long-standing controversy. Long believed by Israel to have been one of its most valuable spies, the report concluded instead that Marwan was a central figure in an Egyptian deception campaign that misled Israel ahead of the 1973 war.

According to the report, Marwan attended meetings from late August 1973 in which Egyptian President Anwar Sadat and Syrian President Hafez al-Assad finalized plans for Operation Badr. Rather than relaying this information to his Israeli handlers, he allegedly provided false reports suggesting alternative dates and downplaying the likelihood of war. The report further stated that even the warning he delivered on the eve of the conflict was imprecise and arrived too late to be of operational value. Former Israeli intelligence chief Maj. Gen. Shlomo Gazit was quoted posthumously as saying Marwan had been planted deep within Israeli intelligence where he manipulated Mossad chief Zvi Zamir and acted as "the central cog" in Egypt’s deception plan.

The revelations were widely celebrated in Egypt, where Marwan is increasingly hailed as a national hero. Egyptian media framed the report as further proof of Egyptian intelligence successes, with commentators calling Marwan "Egypt’s most skilled player in the war of minds" and "the spearhead of Egypt’s strategic deception plan". Egyptian reports noted that Israeli media had acknowledged the "contradictory testimonies within Israel" regarding what they described as one of the most significant espionage cases of the 20th century. Ahmed Anwar, a member of Egypt's Council for Foreign Affairs, argued that the Israeli investigation "did justice" to Marwan and dismissed claims portraying him as a double agent for Israel.

== Post-war career in Egypt ==
On February 14, 1974, Marwan became Secretary to the President of the Republic for Foreign Relations, a new position that reflected Sadat's ruling style. Given Sadat's dissatisfaction with the conduct of his foreign minister, Ismail Fahmy, Marwan was considered a candidate to replace him. By that stage, however, Marwan had accumulated a considerable number of personal enemies who accused him of using his closeness to Sadat to gain personal wealth. When the accusations gained momentum, Sadat had to yield to the pressure and, in March 1976, ended Marwan's service in the Presidential Office.

Marwan was nominated to head the Arab Organization for Industrialization, an arms production complex in Cairo that was financed by Saudi Arabia, the UAE, and Qatar. Following additional political pressures, Marwan had to be relieved of that position in October 1978.

== Activities in London ==
Following Sadat's assassination in October 1981, Marwan and his family moved to London, where he became an arms dealer and, according to The Guardian, a billionaire.

He was an associate of Tiny Rowland, and feuded with Mohammed Al Fayed over the ownership of Harrods. In the early 1990s, Marwan owned a 20% stake in the property firm Cabra, which then owned Chelsea F.C.'s Stamford Bridge grounds and the grounds of Fulham F.C.; his stake was later bought by Ken Bates. In 2002, Marwan acquired a 3.2% stake in Chelsea Village plc, the parent company of the football club.

In 2000, Marwan opened a Credit Suisse bank account through a legal entity; this was publicly reported in 2022 as part of the "Suisse Secrets" revelations.

== Death in London ==
Marwan died on 27 June 2007 outside his flat in Carlton House Terrace, London. The cause of death was traumatic aortic rupture following a fall from the balcony of his fifth-floor apartment. Press reports indicated that the Metropolitan Police Service, as well as Marwan's elder son, Gamal, believed he had been murdered. Marwan's funeral in Egypt was led by Egypt's highest-ranked religious leader, Muhammad Sayyid Tantawy, and attended by, amongst others, Gamal Mubarak, son of the then-current Egyptian President Hosni Mubarak, and intelligence chief Omar Suleiman. According to President Mubarak, "Marwan carried out patriotic acts which it is not yet time to reveal." Following a case review in January 2008, the investigation was transferred to the Metropolitan Police Specialist Crime Directorate, both because of its public nature and because the shoes Marwan was wearing when he fell, key evidence in the case, had been lost. One witness, who was on the third floor of a nearby building, told police that he saw two men "wearing suits and of Mediterranean appearance" appear on the balcony moments after Marwan's fall, look down, and then return inside the apartment. Police are also reported to have lost Marwan's shoes, which could hold clues on whether or not Marwan jumped from the balcony.

A coroner's inquest by William Dolman did not reach a verdict, finding insufficient evidence of either suicide or murder. The inquest found no evidence that Marwan suffered from a psychiatric disorder. Before his death, Marwan had reportedly been stressed and told his wife that he "might be killed"; he also began to check the door and locks before retiring each night. The evening on the day of his death, Marwan had been scheduled to take a flight to the United States for a meeting with his lawyer, and he had recently been admitted to the Reform Club. The sole copy of Marwan's draft memoirs, as well as tapes in which he recorded his recollections, reportedly disappeared.

Marwan was at least the third prominent Egyptian to die in mysterious "balcony deaths" in London. Like Marwan, the two others—Soad Hosny (June 2001) and El-Leithy Nassif (August 1973), had ties to the Egyptian security services and were either writing or planning to write memoirs.

At the time of the investigation, Marwan's wife said she believed that Mossad was behind his death. However, an analysis in The Guardian found this scenario to be unlikely: "For one thing, killing a former agent after his name is revealed would seem to be a major disincentive for new recruits. Even if Israel believed that Marwan was a double agent, working for the Egyptians, better to do nothing and, through their silence, imply he was faithful to their cause." Bar-Joseph, who wrote a biography of Marwan, believes that the Mukhabarat (Egyptian intelligence) under the Mubarak government pushed Marwan or forced him to jump to his death after learning of his betrayal.

== Personal life ==
One of Marwan's sons was married to the daughter of former Arab League Secretary General Amr Moussa. His son, Gamal, is a close friend of Gamal Mubarak, the son of former Egyptian President Hosni Mubarak.
