= Bullet Head =

- Poster
- Directed by: Paul Solet
- Written by: Paul Solet
- Produced by: Milos Djukelic; David Gardner; Yariv Lerner; Victor Shapiro; Paul Solet; Raphael Swann; Les Weldon; Beth Bruckner O'Brien
- Starring: Adrien Brody; Antonio Banderas; John Malkovich; Rory Culkin; Ori Pfeffer
- Cinematography: Zoran Popovic
- Edited by: Josh Ethier
- Music by: Austin Wintory
- Production companies: Saban Films; Millennium Media; Principato-Young Entertainment
- Distributed by: Lionsgate Entertainment
- Release date: December 8, 2017
- Running time: 93 minutes
- Countries: United States; Bulgaria
- Language: English
- Box office: $361,965

Bullet Head (also known as Unchained) is a 2017 American-Bulgarian crime thriller film written and directed by Paul Solet and starring Adrien Brody, Antonio Banderas and John Malkovich.

== Plot ==
Interspersed flashbacks occur of a Perro de Presa Canario, a large mastiff, from a dog fighting ring, as well as his owner Blue (Antonio Banderas), who has abused the dog in order to make it fight. Despite growing large and taking on multiple canine opponents within single matches, the dog has become injured, and Blue instructs the handler (Ori Pfeffer) to put him down.

Following a botched robbery, the getaway driver of a four-man crew was presumably shot as there are three bullet holes shown in the driver's side window. The getaway car crashes into an abandoned warehouse, with its driver dead. The other three criminals, Stacy (Adrien Brody), Walker (John Malkovich), and Gage (Rory Culkin) take refuge in the warehouse. Stacy contacts another driver, but they won't be picked up until the heat dies down the next day. While Stacy and Walker discuss cracking a stolen safe, Gage is in opiate withdrawal and desperate to shoot up. Gage is revealed to have messed up the robbery when he left his post to steal drugs from a pharmacy. As they wait for morning, Stacy thinks of his girlfriend Grace who had left him years before, but asked him to join her. Stacy is hesitant to leave a life of crime. Walker tells Stacy a story from when he was younger; a failed burglary led him to stealing a number of fish from a pet store as a gift for his daughter. However, all the freshwater fish died in the saltwater, but the saltwater fish survived.

Inside a locker room, Gage finds drugs, medical supplies, and testosterone. He then finds the dead body of the dog's handler, and the monster dog itself standing over the corpse. The dog pursues the three men but they are able to trap it in the locker room. Gage drops his bag containing opiate pharmaceuticals on the way out. A police dog handler arrives on the scene to search the vacant building, followed by squad car with another two officers. The mastiff sneaks up on the officer, but does not attack him when the officer shows affection to his K9 dog. The police leave without detecting the criminals. Stacy and Walker share their opinion of dogs, with Stacy telling a story of how he became a dog person after he purchased a poodle to sniff out truffles for a burglary. He'd been caught by a security guard, but the guard was afraid of dogs and ran away.

Gage sneaks back into the locker room where he injects heroin. After he is calmed, Gage bangs on the barricaded door for the other two to let him through. The dog sneak attacks Gage and is released from the locker room. Gage's hand is torn up and Walker is injured falling through some scaffolding. After a brief chase the men barricade themselves in the locker room, but the dog gets in through a hole in the wall. The men make it to the back offices and lock the dog out. While discussing whether or not they are dog-people, Gage tells the story of a dog he rescued as a child. Gage's father couldn't feed the dog, and because Gage stole food for the dog, his father killed it in front of him. While searching the office, Stacy and Walker find a back room full of dog-fighting winnings, at least double what they estimate is in their safe. They bag the cash and return to Gage, but Gage has shot up again and died of an overdose.

Although severely injured, Walker stops Stacy from calling an ambulance, and urges him to leave him behind. Stacy insists on getting him out using the truck Gage had spotted. Stacy returns to the dead dog handler to obtain his car keys, but the handler's body has been dragged away. Following the traces, Stacy also finds a pile of dead dogs. He is repulsed, but quickly is confronted by the mastiff. The mastiff chases Stacy through several rooms before Stacy ends up hiding inside a grand piano from the dog. The mastiff eventually figures out his hiding spot, and furiously attacks the piano until it collapses. Stacy is knocked out, but as he wakes finds the mastiff is stuck under the debris of the piano. Stacy debates leaving, but instead lifts the piano off the dog, who then leaves Stacy unharmed.

Stacy fetches Walker and takes him to the handler's van. As they are about to leave, Blue, the mastiff's owner, pulls up in his car. Seeing them with a bag of his cash, he draws his gun on them and kills Walker. Blue then pursues Stacy through the warehouse with an automatic rifle. Stacy falls from a ledge and escapes through water, but sustains some gunshot injuries and is forced to ditch the bag of money.

Stacy is pursued by Blue into the dog fighting ring; he is shot again, this time severely. As Stacy lies wounded and helpless, Blue tells him a story of how he acquired his first mastiff. This mastiff was owned by his neighbor, and was tearing through Blue's mother's garden. The neighbor did nothing to stop it, so Blue killed the neighbor and took the dog. He chastises Stacy, saying a dog doesn't understand ownership, but a thief, like Stacy, does. The mastiff arrives in the ring, surprising Blue. Blue aims his gun at the dog, but in a moment of egotism, lets his guard down, and the mastiff attacks. Blue and the mastiff wound each other fatally. Stacy crawls up to the dying dog, patting him on the head and calling him a good boy.

A final scene shows Grace watching children play near an ocean, when Stacy arrives with a young puppy in tow.

== Cast ==
- Adrien Brody as Stacy
- John Malkovich as Walker
- Antonio Banderas as "Blue"
- Rory Culkin as Gage
- Alexandra Dinu as Grace
- Ori Pfeffer as The Handler

== Reception ==
The film has a 61% rating on Rotten Tomatoes, based on 18 reviews, with an average rating of 6.1/10. On Metacritic, the film has a weighted average score of 51 out of 100, based on 10 critics, indicating "mixed or average" reviews. Michael Ordona of Common Sense Media awarded the film two stars out of five. Chris Bumbray of JoBlo.com gave it a 7/10. Richard Roeper of the Chicago Sun-Times awarded the film three stars. Michael Gingold of Time Out awarded the film two stars out of five.
