= Uri Bar-Joseph =

Israeli professor of international relations (born 1949)

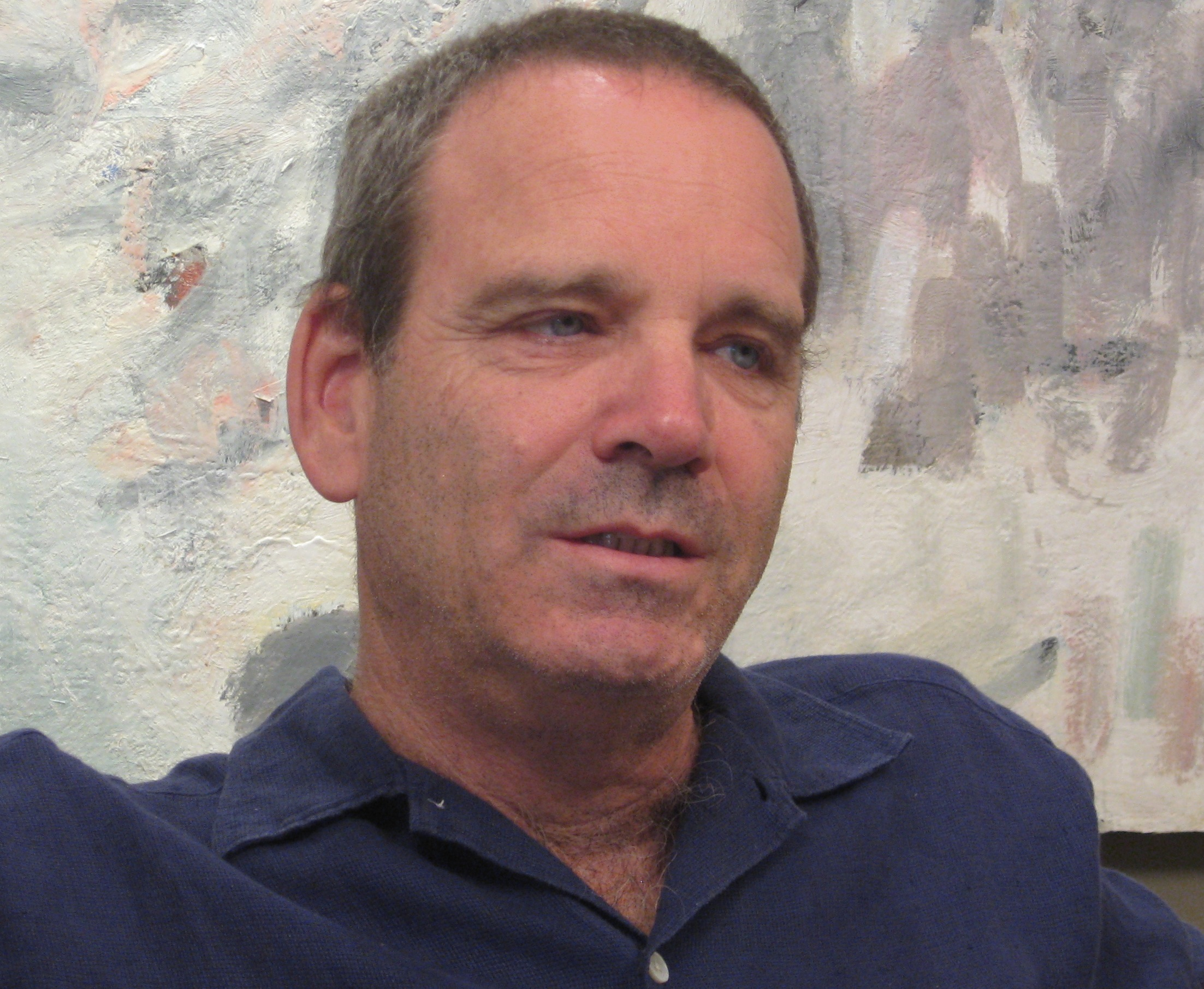
Uri Bar-Joseph

Uri Bar-Joseph (Hebrew: אורי בר-יוסף) is professor emeritus in the Department for International Relations of The School for Political Science at Haifa University. He specializes in national security, intelligence studies, and the Arab-Israeli conflict.

He earned his PhD in 1990 from Stanford University, under the supervision of Alexander George. His dissertation, Intelligence Intervention in the Politics of Democratic States: The US, Israel, and Britain was published by Penn State Press and won Choice's Outstanding Academic Books Award for 1996.

Bar-Joseph is best known for his studies of the intelligence failure of the Yom Kippur War. His book, The Watchman Fell Asleep (SUNY, 2005), is the first detailed academic study of the subject and is considered the most important study in the field. The Hebrew edition (2001) won the Israeli Political Science Association Best Book Award in 2002. The Israeli-made docudrama, "The Silence of the Sirens", which is based on Bar-Joseph's book, won the Israeli Academy Award for the best television feature film in 2004.

In 2016, Bar-Joseph published The Angel:The Egyptian spy who saved Israel (HarperCollins), which recounts the story of Ashraf Marwan (code-named by the Mossad "The Angel"), who was President Gamal Abdel Nasser's son-in-law, President Sadat's close advisor, and an Israeli spy. The book was the winner of the National Jewish Book Award (History) in 2016 and was selected by the American Association of Former Intelligence Officers (AFIO) as the Best Intelligence Book of 2017.

A Netflix movie, The Angel, based on Bar-Josef's book, was released in 2018. The publisher of the Egyptian edition of the book, Khaled Lotfy, was sentenced to five years in prison in April 2019 for “spreading rumors and revealing military secrets”. He was awarded the International Publishers’ Association (IPA) Prix Voltaire and was released from jail in November 2022.

In 2017 Bar-Joseph co-authored with Rose McDermott, in publishing Intelligence Success and Failure: The Human Factor by Oxford University Press.

In August 2021, Bar-Joseph published the book A War of Its Own: The Israeli Air Force in the Yom Kippur War (forthcoming in English.) Drawing on new data, the book explains why the Israeli Air Force failed to adequately support ground troops during most of the fighting, despite its obvious airborne superiority and state-of-the-art equipment.

Bar-Joseph’s next book, Resilience, The IDF and the Yom Kippur War (Hebrew, Dvir, 2023), challenged the commonly accepted view, which locates the cause for Israel’s military failures in the deep, long-term processes that had changed Israeli society and the IDF since the Six-Day War. The root of the problem, the book claims, lies in the failures of specific individuals, most notably Chief of Military Intelligence Eli Zeira, Chief of the Southern Command Shmuel “Gorodish” Gonen, and Commander of the Israeli Air Force Benny Peled, whose underperformance and grave mistakes played key roles in the army’s overall unpreparedness. The book also describes the IDF’s remarkable military achievements, following its recovery after the first two days of fighting. It won the Chaikin Prize, Haifa University (2024), and the Yitzhak Sadeh Prize for Military Literature in 2025.

Bar-Joseph's most recent book is "Beyond the Iron Wall: The Fatal Flaw in Israel's National Security" (Hebrew, Dvir, 2024). The trigger for writing the book was the October 7 Hamas attack and its main claim is that Israel continues to live under heavy threats not due to a lack of military power but because it has refused and still refuses to reach political agreements centered around returning the territories occupied in 1967. These agreements would aim to create a new status quo that reduces the motivation and ability of various regional actors to harm Israel’s security.

Bar-Joseph is a member of the New Israel Fund and a supporter of the anti-occupation NGO “Breaking the Silence.” He was an outspoken opponent of Benjamin Netanyahu’s policy on the Iranian nuclear program and, in 2005, signed his name to a petition supporting faculty and students’ right to refuse to serve in the occupied territories.

== Published works ==
- Two Minutes Over Baghdad, with Amos Perlmutter and Michael I. Handel, London: Corgi, 1982, London: Frank Cass, 2003
- The Best of Enemies: Israel and Transjordan in the War of 1948, London: Frank Cass, 1987
- Intelligence intervention in the politics of democratic states: the United States, Israel, and Britain, University Park: The Pennsylvania State University Press, 1995
- Israel's National Security Towards the 21st Century (ed.), London: Frank Cass, 2001
- The Watchman Fell Asleep: The Surprise of the Yom Kippur War and Its Sources, Albany: State of New York University Press, 2005
- The Angel: The Egyptian Spy who Saved Israel, New York: HarperCollins, 2016
- Intelligence Success and Failure: A comparative Study, with Rose McDermott, Oxford UP, 2016
- Surprise Attack: The Ultimate Test of Intelligence and Leadership, Modi'in: Kineret-Zmora-Dvir, 2019
- A War of Its Own: The Israeli Air Force in the Yom Kippur War, Modi'in: Kineret-Zmora-Dvir, 2021
- Resilience: The IDF and the Yom Kippur War, Modi'in: Kineret-Zmora-Dvir, 2023
- Beyond the Iron Wall: The Fatal Flaw in Israel's National Security, Modi'in: Kineret-Zmora-Dvir, 2024

=== Essays and articles ===
- The Hidden Debate: The Formation of Nuclear Doctrines in the Middle East, The Journal of Strategic Studies, Vol. 5, No. 2, 1982, pp. 205–227
- Methodological Magic, Intelligence and National Security, Vol. 3, No. 4, 1988, pp. 134–155
- Uri Bar-Joseph, John Hannah, Intervention Threats in Short Arab-Israeli Wars: An Analysis of Soviet Crisis Behavior, The Journal of Strategic Studies, Vol. 11, No. 4, 1988, pp. 46–76
- Uri Bar-Joseph, John Ferris, Getting Marlowe to Hold His Tongue: The Conservative Party, the Intelligence Services and the Zinoviev Letter, Intelligence and National Security, Vol. 8, No. 4, 1993, pp. 100–137
- Israel's Intelligence Failure of 1973: New Evidence, A New Interpretation, and Theoretical Implications, Security Studies, Vol. 4, No. 3, 1995, pp. 584–609
- Israel Caught Unaware: Egypt's Sinai Surprise of 1960, International Journal of Intelligence and CounterIntelligence, Vol. 8, No. 2, 1995, pp. 203–219
- The Wealth of Information and the Poverty of Comprehension: Israel's Intelligence Failure of 1973 Revisited, Intelligence and National Security, Vol. 10, No. 4, 1995, pp. 229–240
- Rotem: The Forgotten Crisis on the Road to the 1967 War, Journal of Contemporary History, vol. 31, no. 3, 1996, pp. 547–566
- State-Intelligence Relations in Israel: 1948–1997, Journal of Conflict Studies Vol.17, No.2, 1997, pp. 133–156
- Variations on a Theme: The Conceptualization of Deterrence in Israeli Strategic Thinking, Security Studies, Vol.7, No.3, 1998, pp. 149–184
- A Bull in a China Shop: Netanyahu and Israel’s Intelligence Community, International Journal of Intelligence and CounterIntelligence, Vol.11, No.2, 1998, pp. 154–174
- Israel’s Northern Eyes and Shield: The Strategic Value of the Golan Heights Revisited, The Journal of Strategic Studies, Vol.21, No.3, 1998, pp. 46–66
- Uri Bar-Joseph, Zachary Sheaffer, Barings and Yom Kippur: Surprise Despite Warning in Business Administration and Strategic Studies, International Journal of Intelligence and CounterIntelligence, Vol.11, No.3, 1998, pp. 331–349
- Israel’s 1973 Intelligence Failure, Israel Affairs, Vol.6, No.1, 1999, pp. 11–35
- Towards a Paradigm Shift in Israel’s National Security Conception, Israel Affairs, Vol.6, No. 2&3, 2000, pp. 81–103
- Israel's National Security Towards the 21st Century: Introduction, The Journal of Strategic Studies (A Special issue on: Israel's National Security Towards the 21st Century), Vol.24, No.2, 2001, pp. 1–12
- Intelligence Failure and the Need for Cognitive Closure: The Case of Yom Kippur, 'The Paradox of Intelligence: Essays in Memory of Michael I. Handel, Richard K. Betts and Thomas Mahnken (eds.), Frank Cass, 2003, pp. 166–89
- Uri Bar-Joseph, Arie W. Kruglanski, Intelligence Failure and the Need for Cognitive Closure: On the Psychology of the Yom Kippur Surprise, Political Psychology, Vol. 24, No.1, 2003, pp. 75–99
- Roundtable: The Settlements, Yale Israel Journal, No.7, 2005, pp. 23–33
- The Paradox of Israeli Power, Survival, Vol.46, No.4, 2004, pp. 137–156
- The Historiography of the Yom Kippur War: Major Aspects in a Thirty-Year Perspective, Journal of Israeli History, Vol.24, No.2, 2005, pp. 251–66
- Uri Bar-Joseph, Dima Adamsky, ’The Russians are not Coming’: Israel’s Intelligence Failure and the Soviet Military Intervention in the ‘War of Attrition’ in 1970, Intelligence and National Security, 2006, Vol.21, No.1, pp. 1–25
- Last Chance to Avoid War: Sadat's Peace Initiative of February 1973 and Its Failure, Journal of Contemporary History, vol. 41, no. 3, 2006, pp. 545–556
- A Chance not taken: Sadat's Peace Initiative of February 1973 and Its Rejection by Israel, The Journal of Contemporary History, 2006, Vol. 41, No. 3, pp. 545–556
- Israel’s Military Intelligence Performance in the Second Lebanon War, International Journal of Intelligence and CounterIntelligence, 2007, Vol.20, No.4, 583–601
- Lessons not Learned: Israel in the Post-Yom Kippur War Era, Israel Affairs, 2008, Vol. 14, No.1, pp. 70–83
- The Intelligence Chief who Went Fishing in the Cold: How the Identity of Israel's Most Valuable Source in Egypt was Leaked by Maj. Gen. (res.) Eli Zeira. Intelligence and National Security Vol.23, No.2, 2008, pp. 226–248
- Uri Bar-Joseph, Rose Mcdermott, Personal Functioning under Stress: Accountability and Social Support of Israeli Leaders in the Yom Kippur War, The Journal of Conflict Resolution, vol. 52, no. 1, 2008, pp. 144–170
- Uri Bar-Joseph, Rose Mcdermott, Change the Analyst and Not the System: A Different Approach to Intelligence Reform, Foreign Policy Analysis, vol. 4, no. 2, 2008, pp. 127–145
- Strategic Surprise or Fundamental Flaws: The Causes of Israel's Military Defeat at the Beginning of the 1973 War, The Journal of Military History 72, 2008, pp. 11–41
- Uri Bar-Joseph, Jack S. Levy, Conscious Action and Intelligence Failure, Political Science Quarterly, vol. 124, no. 3, 2009, pp. 461–488
- The Hubris of initial victory: The IDF and the Second Lebanon War, Israel and Hizbollah: An asymmetric conflict in historical and comparative perspective, Clive Jones and Sergio Catignani (eds.), London: Routledge, 2009, pp, 147–62
- The 1973 Yom Kippur War, Israel Studies: An Anthology, Mitchell G. Bard and David Nachmias (eds), AICE Publication, 2009
- Military Intelligence as the National Intelligence Estimator: The Case of Israel, Armed Forces and Society, Vol 36, 2010, pp. 505–525
- Uri Bar-Joseph, Rose Mcdermott, The Intelligence Analysis Crisis, The Oxford Handbook of National Security Intelligence, Loch Johnson (ed.), New York: Oxford UP, 2010, pp. 359–374
- The Intelligence Community During the Yom Kippur War (1973), Israel's Silent Defender: An Inside Look at Sixty Years of Israeli Intelligence, Amos Gilboa and Ephraim Lapid (eds.), Jerusalem: Gefen, 2011, pp. 76–87
- The Intelligence Professional Ethics, International Journal of Intelligence and CounterIntelligenc, Vol 24, 2011, pp. 22–43
- Deterrence Policy in a Changing Strategic Environment, ArmsControl and Missile Proliferation in the Middle East, Bernd W. Kubbig and Sven-Eric Fikenscher (eds.), Routledge, 2012, pp. 89–105
- Why Israel Should Trade Its Nukes?, Foreign Affairs, 2012
- Uri Bar-Joseph, Ehud Eiran, The Arab-Israeli Wars, 1967–1973, Oxford Bibliographies Online, 2013
- The ‘Special Means of Collection’: The Missing Link in the Surprise of the Yom Kippur War, Middle East Journal, vol. 67, no. 4, 2013, pp. 531–546
- Forecasting a Hurricane: Israeli and American Estimations of the Khomeini Revolution, The Journal of Strategic Studies, Vol. 36, 5, 2013, pp. 718–742
- Politicization of Intelligence: A Comparative Study, The International Journal of Intelligence and CounterIntelligence, 26, Vol. 2, 2013, pp. 347–369
- Israel's Intelligence Community, Routledge Companion to Intelligence Studies, Robert Dover, Michael S. Goodman, and Claudia Hillebrand (eds.), Routledge, 2013, pp. 209–217
- Uri Bar-Joseph Amr Yussef, The Hidden Factors that Turned the Tide: Strategic Decision-Making and Operational Intelligence in the 1973 War, The Journal of Strategic Studies, Vol.37, 4 2014, pp. 584–608
- A Question of Loyalty: Ashraf Marwan and Israel’s Intelligence Fiasco in the Yom Kippur War, Intelligence and National Security, Vol. 30, 5 2014, pp. 667–685
- Uri Bar-Joseph, Rose McDermott, Pearl Harbor and Midway: The Decisive Influence of Two Men on the Outcomes, Intelligence and National Security 2016, Vol 31, pp. 949–962

=== Essays and articles in Hebrew ===
- Don’t Let Them Estimate: Why the IDF Should Not Be Responsible for Political Intelligence, Maarachot, No. 328, 1993, pp. 38–45 (Hebrew)
- The Surprise of Yom Kippur and Its Causes, Maarachot, No. 361, 1998, pp. 14–28 (Hebrew)
- Fifty Years of Israeli Deterrence Policy: Lessons from the Past, Thoughts for the Future, Maarachot 366–367, 1999, pp. 12–30 (Hebrew)
- Fifty Years of Israeli Deterrence Policy: Lessons from the Past, Thoughts for the Future, Maarachot, No. 366-367, 1999, pp. 12–30 (Hebrew)
- Unconcluded Conclusions, Thirty Years Later: Challenges to Israel Since the Yom Kippur War, Anat Kurz (ed.), Tel Aviv: The Jaffee Center for Strategic Studies, Tel Aviv University, 2004, pp. 23–30 (Hebrew)
- Intelligence and Politics, Leaders and Intelligence, Tel Aviv: Ministry of Defense, The Broadcast University, 2004, pp. 55–67 (Hebrew)
- The Sources of the Problematic Relationship Between Intelligence Producers and Consumers, 'Leaders and Intelligence, Tel Aviv: Ministry of Defense, The Broadcast University, 2004, pp. 42–54 (Hebrew)
- The Interaction Between Intelligence Officers and Policymakers Prior to the 1973 War, The War of Yom Kippur and Its Lessons, Tel Aviv: Ministry of Defense, The Broadcast University, 2004, pp. 28–36 (Hebrew)
- The War of Yom Kippur as a ‘War of Choice’, The War of Yom Kippur and Its Lessons, Tel Aviv: Ministry of Defense, The Broadcast University, 2004, pp. 114–122 (Hebrew)
- Crisis in Israel's National Security Conception, Maarachot, No. 401, 2005, pp. 10–19 (Hebrew)
- National Intelligence Estimate – Why is there a need for a reexamination?, Mabat Malam No. 46, 2006, pp. 32–36 (Hebrew)
- Leaders Under Stress: Golda Meir and Moshe Dayan in the Yom Kippur War, Leadership at Times of War, Yosi Goldstein and Adli Dular (Eds.), Rehovot: Weitzman Institute, 2007, pp. 139–46 (Hebrew)
- Golda Meir, Anwar Sadat, and the Coming of the Yom Kippur War, Alpayim, Vol. (969) 31, 2007, (Hebrew)
- Surprise as Disrupting Strategic Plans: The First Thirty Hours of the Yom Kippur War, 'National Trauma: The War of Yom Kippur after Thirty Years and another War, Moshe Shemesh and Zeev Drory (eds.), Beer Shaba: Ben-Gurion University Press, 2008, pp. 137–49 (Hebrew)
- Uri Bar-Joseph, Kobi Palkov, A Failure in June and Success in October: Soviet Intelligence and Operation Barbarossa, Maarachot, No. 438, 2011, pp. 46–55 (Hebrew)
- American Failure and Israeli Success, Mabat Malam, No. 59, 2011, pp. 32–35 (Hebrew)
- The Misuse of Israel’s National Security Policy: A New Explanation for the Intelligence Failure in the 1973 War, Maarachot, No. 448, 2013, pp. 46–53 (Hebrew)
- The Historiography of the Yom Kippur War: A Forty Years’ Perspective, Iyunim Bitkumat Yisrael, Vol. 23, 2013, pp. 1–33 (Hebrew)
- The Special Means of Collection and the Yom Kippur Intelligence Failure: A New Look, The Yom Kippur War – 40 Years After, Zohar Avraham (ed.), The Institute for the Research of Israel's Wars, 2013, pp. 123–142 (Hebrew)
- Uri Bar Joseph, The Intelligence Before the War, Yom Kippur War - Commanders and Researchers Chair, ed. Benny Michelson, Effie Meltzer, 2013, pp. 425–438
- Eli Zeira, a well-known liar on the Yom Kippur War, Hedim, Israel's Intelligence Heritage & Commemoration Center, 2015, pp. 49–57 (Hebrew)
- The Best Times of Eli Zeira, Hedim B, Israel's Intelligence Heritage & Commemoration Center, 2016, pp. 28–37 (Hebrew)
- I do not Know the Truth, Only my Memoirs, Hedim B, Israel's Intelligence Heritage & Commemoration Center, 2016, pp. 56–66 (Hebrew)
