= David Arata =

American screenwriter and producer

- Education: American Film Institute
- Notable work: Children of Men, Spy Game, Brokedown Palace

David Arata is an American screenwriter and producer. He received national acclaim for his adaptive screenplay Children of Men in 2007, garnering an Academy Award nomination and multiple other industry awards. Arata's other screenwriting credits include Spy Game, Brokedown Palace, and most recently, The Angel.

== Early life ==
Arata was raised in the San Francisco suburbs and attended UC Santa Cruz, where he studied painting, theater and film. He subsequently attended The American Film Institute Conservatory to focus on film directing.

== Career ==
Arata made his screenwriting debut in 1999 with Fox 2000's Brokedown Palace, followed by the film Spy Game in 2001. He was widely recognized for his role in Children of Men, which received an Academy Award nomination for Best Adapted Screenplay in 2007 and won the USC Scripter Award, Austin Film Critics Award, and Online Film Critics Award.

Arata's work encompasses a variety of genres, including thriller, drama, and fantasy. He has collaborated with many influential directors, including Peter Weir on the still unmade Pattern Recognition, Alfonso Cuarón on Children of Men, and Tony Scott on Spy Game. His screenplays have attracted the participation of Hollywood stars, including Brad Pitt, Robert Redford, Claire Danes, Kate Beckinsale, Clive Owen, and Julianne Moore.

Arata's additional writing credits include the sci-fi picture, Inversion and the fantasy-comedy teleplay Frog (1987). His most recent work, The Angel, debuted as a Netflix original film in 2018.

More recently, David has broadened his focus to include serialized television, adapting Alan Moore and Eddie Campbell’s graphic novel, From Hell, to produce for FX, and Dreamland (AKA Nightrise) created for Spike TV. He is also slated to produce a film based on Adam Penenberg’s nonfiction book Tragic Indifference: One Man's Battle with the Auto Industry alongside Michael Douglas.

== Personal life ==
Arata has worked to mentor young screenwriters in his role as a creative advisor to the Sundance Screenwriter Lab and as a moderator in a screenwriting master class presented by the Latino Mediafest. He lives in Los Angeles with his wife, Kathy.
