= Backcountry (film) =

- Theatrical release poster
- Directed by: Adam MacDonald
- Written by: Adam MacDonald
- Produced by: Thomas Michael
- Starring: Missy Peregrym; Jeff Roop; Eric Balfour; Nicholas Campbell
- Cinematography: Christian Bielz
- Edited by: Dev Singh
- Music by: Frères Lumières
- Distributed by: IFC Midnight
- Release dates: September 8, 2014 (TIFF); March 20, 2015 (United States); August 14, 2015 (Canada)
- Running time: 92 minutes
- Country: Canada
- Language: English
- Box office: $71,874

Backcountry is a 2014 Canadian nature–survival horror film, written and directed by Adam MacDonald, marking his feature film directorial debut.

The film premiered at the 2014 Toronto International Film Festival, and received positive reviews from critics upon release. It has gone on to become an enduring favourite in the survival horror genre.

== Plot ==
Alex and his girlfriend Jenn leave the city for a camping weekend at a provincial nature reserve in Ontario, Canada. Alex plans to explore his favourite trail, despite being informed that it's closed for the season, and refuses a map against park ranger warnings. After paddling out across a lake, Alex drops their canoe on his foot, but insists he isn't hurt. Brad, an Irish tour guide, passes their camp, and Jenn invites him to have dinner with them. Brad behaves in an increasingly crude and abrasive manner, flirting with Jenn and belittling Alex. He departs after they finish eating. Jenn is left uncomfortable, while Alex is annoyed with her.

The following morning, Alex takes Jenn off-trail, heading toward a lake he remembers. He sees a bear paw print in the ground and does not alert her. In the evening, Alex inspects his injured foot, and has to pull out a broken toenail before Jenn dresses his wound. The next day, they see a half-eaten deer carcass. When they fail to find the lake, they realize they are lost. Jenn looks for her cell phone, but Alex reveals he left it in the car, not wanting her to be distracted and reasoning that there isn't any reception in the area. Jenn berates Alex for his need to show off, pointing out that it's her first camping trip and he took her too far into the woods. When she asks why they even came in the first place, Alex reveals he was planning to propose.

Jenn later apologizes to Alex for insulting him, and they make camp. They wake up to find their food has been eaten by a bear, but Alex insists it was a raccoon. When they come across a bear bed, they walk as far from it as they can before dark. The couple reconciles after Alex finally apologizes for their situation being his fault. The next morning, Alex sees a bear outside the tent. He and Jenn try to stay quiet, but it claws through the tent, injuring Jenn's arm and biting Alex's leg. She drives it back with bear spray, but watches in horror as the bear returns and drags Alex from the tent, mauling him to death. Jenn flees with only the engagement ring and a road flare. She falls down an incline, and is briefly knocked unconscious when her head hits a rock.

After recovering, Jenn continues through the woods, then climbs a tree to sleep. Later, a passing helicopter wakes her. Jenn finds a stream, where she drinks, cleans out her wound, and applies a makeshift tourniquet. While trying to forage for food, she encounters another bear, which pursues her toward a waterfall. Jenn escapes by climbing down the wet rock face, but slips and breaks her ankle. She painfully splints the injury, using a branch as a crutch and the flare to continue moving after dark. Eventually, she passes out from exhaustion. Jenn awakens and sees a caribou. Attempting to follow it, she comes upon the lake shore and a park-provided canoe. Jenn paddles back to the park entrance and collapses. Brad is alerted by a member of the tour group he's preparing to lead, and rushes to help her.

== Cast ==
- Missy Peregrym as Jenn
- Jeff Roop as Alex Louis
- Eric Balfour as Brad
- Nicholas Campbell as The Ranger
- Chester and Charlie as The Bear

== Production ==
Backcountry is loosely based on the true story of a hungry man-eating black bear that attacked Mark Jordan and Jacqueline Perry in the back country of Missinaibi Lake Provincial Park, North of Chapleau, Ontario in 2005, events for which Mark later received the Star of Courage award from Governor General Michaëlle Jean.

Production took place from October through November 2013. The film was shot in Powassan, Ontario and Caddy Lake, Manitoba and was funded by Telefilm Canada and Northern Ontario Heritage Fund.

== Release ==
The film premiered at the Toronto International Film Festival on September 8, 2014.

== Reception ==
On review aggregator Rotten Tomatoes, Backcountry holds an approval rating of 92%, based on 50 reviews, and an average rating of 7/10. Its consensus reads, "Tense, well-acted, and at once atmospheric as well as brutally impactful, Backcountry marks a memorably assured debut from writer-director Adam MacDonald." On Metacritic, the film has a weighted average score of 62 out of 100, based on 5 critics, indicating "generally positive reviews".

Although not a box office success, Backcountry has gone on to gain popularity via streaming and the internet.
