= Jewel of the Sahara =

2000 film by Ariel Vromen

- United States theatrical poster
- Directed by: Ariel Vromen
- Screenplay by: Ariel Vromen; Alon Aranya; Kennedy Taylor
- Produced by: Kevin Keyser; Ariel Vromen
- Starring: Gerard Butler; Clifford David; Peter Franzén
- Cinematography: Gerardo Mateo Madrazo
- Edited by: Ariel Vromen
- Music by: Gahl Sasson
- Release date: June 28, 2001
- Running time: 17 minutes
- Country: United States
- Language: English

Jewel of the Sahara is a 2001 short comedy film starring Gerard Butler, Clifford David as the old Francois Renard and Peter Franzén as the young Francois Renard. The short film is directed by Ariel Vromen, who also wrote the screenplay, was the executive producer, and edited the film. The film was made by Keyser Productions.

== Plot ==
Set in a French Foreign Legion Camp circa 1954, the film follows the fantasies of a British captain, desperately missing his home and wife. The captain is caught in an embarrassing situation caused by a combination of the monotonous, hot dreary surroundings, not grasping the workings of the Foreign Legion, and his smoldering desire created by his wife's lustful love letters, all of which is befuddled by his use of drugs.

== Cast ==
- Gerard Butler as Captain Charles Belamy
- Clifford David as Old Francois Renard
- Peter Franzén as Young Francois Renard
- Ori Pfeffer as Mahmud
- Ralph Lister as Harold Belamy
- Nicholl Hiren as Sargent
- Gian Saragosa as Gamal
- Ari Averbach
- Andre Alfa as Legionnaire #8
- Gahl Sasson as Legionnaire #1
- Rodrigo Madrazo as Legionnaire #2
- Tomer Almagor as Legionnaire #3
- Lionel Renard as Legionnaire #4 (as Leonal Renard)
- Gili Pinchuck as Legionnaire #5
- Santiago Barriero as Legionnaire #6
- Kevin Keyser as Legionnaire #7
