= Intelligence and National Security =

- Discipline: Political science and History
- Language: English
- Edited by: Mark Phythian

Publication details
- History: 1986-present
- Publisher: Routledge
- Frequency: 7/year

Standard abbreviations
- ISO 4: Intell. Natl. Secur.

Indexing
- ISSN: 0268-4527 (print); 1743-9019 (web)
- OCLC no.: 857525697

Links
- Journal homepage; Online access

Intelligence and National Security is a peer-reviewed academic journal focused on the role of intelligence in international relations and politics. The journal was established in 1986 by Christopher Andrew and Michael I. Handel as the first academic journal that publishes research on intelligence's role in national security and international affairs and is published by Routledge. In 1990 the consulting editor of the journal was Oleg Gordievsky. As of 2017 the editors were Mark Phythian and Stephen Marrin.
