= 1992 (film) =

2024 film by Ariel Vromen

- Theatrical release poster
- Directed by: Ariel Vromen
- Screenplay by: Sascha Penn; Ariel Vromen
- Story by: Sascha Penn
- Produced by: Ariel Vromen; Maurice Fadida; Adam Kolbrenner; Sascha Penn; Andreas Rommel
- Starring: Tyrese Gibson; Clé Bennett; Dylan Arnold; Christopher A'mmanuel; Michael Beasley; Ori Pfeffer; Tosin Morohunfola; Oleg Taktarov; Scott Eastwood; Ray Liotta
- Cinematography: Frank G. DeMarco
- Edited by: Danny Rafic
- Music by: Gilad Benamram
- Production companies: Kodiak Pictures; Trident Films; Sumatra Films; Death Row Pictures
- Distributed by: Lionsgate
- Release date: August 30, 2024
- Running time: 93 minutes
- Country: United States
- Language: English
- Budget: $6.5 million
- Box office: $2.9 million

1992 is a 2024 American crime heist thriller film directed by Ariel Vromen and written by Sascha Penn and Vromen from a story by Penn. The film stars Tyrese Gibson, Scott Eastwood, and Ray Liotta in his final film role. Producer Dot da Genius makes a cameo appearance in the film as his film debut. The working title of the film, April 29, 1992, refers to the first night of the 1992 Los Angeles riots, which is when and where the film is set; the title was later simplified to 1992.

The film was released in the United States on August 30, 2024. It received mixed reviews from critics and grossed $2.9 million worldwide.

== Plot ==
In Los Angeles, ex-con Mercer endeavors to restore his life and relationship with his son as the Rodney King verdict is issued. Meanwhile, in another part of town, a father and son confront their troubled relationship by planning a perilous heist at Mercer's workplace. As tensions escalate and the 1992 Los Angeles riots begin, the two families cross paths.

== Cast ==
- Tyrese Gibson as Mercer Bey
- Scott Eastwood as Riggin
- Ray Liotta as Lowell
- Clé Bennett as Copeland
- Michael Beasley as Joseph Francis
- Christopher A'mmanuel as Antoine King
- Dylan Arnold as Dennis
- Tosin Morohunfola as D-Ville
- Ori Pfeffer as Murphy
- Oleg Taktarov as Titus
- Dot da Genius as himself

== Production ==
In August 2015, it was reported that Ice Cube and O'Shea Jackson Jr. would star in the film, then titled April 29, 1992, with Will Packer producing, Donovan Marsh directing and Lionsgate serving as distributor. However, Cube's publicist released a statement confirming that Cube and Jackson have no involvement with the film.

In March 2021, it was announced that Vromen would direct the film. In July 2021, it was announced that Gibson, Liotta and Eastwood were cast in the film. In September 2021, it was announced that Beasley was cast in the film and that filming was underway in Bulgaria and Los Angeles. In February 2022, it was announced that Ammanuel and Arnold were cast in the film.

Collider reported that Liotta completed the filming of his scenes before his death in May 2022.

== Release ==
1992 was given a limited theatrical release in the United States on August 30, 2024.

== Reception ==
=== Box office ===
In the United States and Canada, 1992 was released alongside Reagan, Slingshot, AfrAId, and City of Dreams, and was projected to gross around $2.5 million in its opening weekend. It debuted to $1.8 million over the four-day Labor Day weekend.

=== Critical response ===
On the review aggregator website Rotten Tomatoes, 65% of 43 critics' reviews are positive, with an average rating of 6/10. Metacritic, which uses a weighted average, assigned the film a score of 44 out of 100, based on 7 critics, indicating "mixed or average" reviews. Audiences polled by CinemaScore gave the film an average grade of "A-" on an A+ to F scale.

Randy Myers of the San Jose Mercury News said, "Genuine scenes between Gibson and Ammanuel, aid in making “1992” a genre exercise with much more on its mind than you might suspect." Jeremy K. Gover of the Untitled Film Project Podcast said, "Remove the historical context and 1992 still encompasses a remarkable story about race relations, intergenerational empathy, socioeconomic divides, moral navigation and family dynamics, all while being a solid heist film."

Ben Kenigsberg of The New York Times wrote that "The look is drab, the action is barely coherent, and Liotta deserved to go out with a better line than 'I did the best that I could, son. I’m sorry it wasn’t enough'." A sentiment echoed by Roger Moore of Movie Nation, who felt that the film was "even straining to get to the label 'solid'."

Richard Whittaker of the Austin Chronicle in a mixed summary noted the "feel" of the period, but was disappointed that "the only element of Nineties Americana he (Vromen) really resurrects is the mediocre amoral crime flick", while other reviewers bemoaned the "glaring plot holes" and "Formulaic plotting".
