= The Angel (2018 film) =

- Film poster
- Directed by: Ariel Vromen
- Written by: David Arata
- Based on: The Angel: The Egyptian Spy Who Saved Israel by Uri Bar-Joseph
- Produced by: Simon Istolainen; Zafrir Kochanovsky; Antoine Stioui; Matt O'Toole (Executive Producer); Esther Hornstein (Co-Executive Producer)
- Starring: Marwan Kenzari; Toby Kebbell
- Cinematography: Terry Stacey
- Edited by: Danny Rafic
- Music by: Pinar Toprak
- Production companies: Adama Pictures; TTV Productions; Sumatra Films
- Distributed by: Netflix
- Release date: 14 September 2018
- Running time: 114 minutes
- Countries: Egypt; Israel; United Kingdom
- Languages: English; Arabic; Hebrew
- Budget: $12 million

The Angel is an Israeli spy thriller film directed by Ariel Vromen and starring Marwan Kenzari and Toby Kebbell among others. It is an adaptation of the non-fiction book The Angel: The Egyptian Spy Who Saved Israel written by Uri Bar-Joseph. It is a fictional account of Ashraf Marwan, a high-ranking Egyptian official who became a double agent for both countries and helped achieve peace between the two.

== Plot ==
During the Six-Day War in 1967, Israel conquers and occupies large areas of land, including the Sinai Peninsula which then (and now) belonged to Egypt.

On September 3, 1973, Ashraf Marwan meets Arab terrorists outside Rome International Airport, with a missile launcher that he smuggled into Italy in his suitcase. He tells the terrorists that he must leave immediately, as he is an Egyptian diplomat who cannot be discovered at the place of the attack, while the insurgents aim the launcher at a commercial airliner that is heading to Israel.

Three years earlier, in 1970, Ashraf lived and studied in London with his wife, Mona, the daughter of Egyptian President Gamal Abdel Nasser, and their son. Ashraf disagreed with Nasser on how to proceed in the Arab-Israeli conflict and suggested that Nasser prevent further bloodshed and try a diplomatic solution with Israel, with the United States as a peace broker. However, Nasser and his men fear this will lose them the support of the Soviet Union. Realising the Soviet Union is a declining power, Ashraf insists Egypt cut its ties with the Soviets. Nasser rebukes Ashraf and afterward urges Mona to divorce her husband, which Ashraf overhears.

Angry and embarrassed, Ashraf is further humiliated when he finds out that Nasser, on whom they are financially dependent, is having him followed when he goes out with friends, causing Mona to worry that Ashraf is having an affair with actress Diana Ellis. Frustrated, Ashraf decides to call the Israeli Ambassador to the United Kingdom, Michael Comay, to share important information. When the embassy refuses to connect him to Comay, Ashraf hangs up.

Soon after, President Nasser dies of a heart attack, and Ashraf and his family are recalled to Cairo. Vice President Anwar Sadat becomes the next president of Egypt. Ashraf wins Sadat's trust by uncovering high-level corruption within the Egyptian government and slowly begins to climb the political ladder, eventually becoming an important political player in Egypt. His family life suffers from his political career, although Ashraf finds time to read his son a bedtime story, The Boy Who Cried Wolf.

Back in London, Mossad agents finally reach out to Ashraf, playing him a recording of his previous call to the Israeli embassy. Ashraf meets his Mossad handler, Alex, and begins to sell his country's secrets to the Israeli government. The information that Ashraf provides is initially reliable and Alex and Ashraf develop a mutual rapport, with Ashraf being codenamed "the Angel." Eventually, however, Ashraf warns the Israelis on two occasions that Egypt will launch a military invasion, which never comes to pass. This puts a severe strain on his relationship with Mossad, who starts doubting Ashraf's trustworthiness.

When Israel shoots down a Libyan commercial plane filled with civilians, Libyan leader Muammar Gaddafi wants vengeance, but Sadat is not willing to attack civilians. Knowing it would anger Gaddafi and the other Arab nations if Egypt did not support Libya, Ashraf came up with a ploy to stabilize the situation. He goes to Gaddafi to pledge Egypt's support but makes sure that their retaliatory attack is not successful.

Back at Rome International Airport on September 3, 1973, Ashraf removed a pin from the missile launcher before giving it to the terrorists, rendering it ineffective. When the Israeli commercial airliner takes off, the launcher does not fire. Italian authorities, having been notified about the terrorists by Ashraf, apprehended them.

Having regained Mossad's trust, Ashraf informs Alex and Mossad chief Zvi Zamir about an imminent Egyptian invasion of Israel on Yom Kippur. However, Israel dismisses the warning as yet another false alarm, like the previous two warnings. It is then revealed that this was Ashraf's plan all along, inspired by the fable of the Boy Who Cried Wolf. Realizing that peace could only be achieved through diplomacy, not war, but also knowing that Israel would not agree to any peace talks while they had the military upper hand, Ashraf decided to pave the way for a short but successful surprise attack on Israel. A military stalemate between Israel and Egypt ensues in the Yom Kippur War, peace talks begin and the two countries finally broker a peace treaty which heralds a period of lasting peace and sees both Sadat and Menachem Begin receive the Nobel Peace Prize. At the same time, Ashraf's marriage to Mona ends as Mona, kept in the dark about Ashraf's plan, believes his frequent trips abroad and continued friendship with Diana Ellis - in actuality part of a cover for his mission - confirm that he is having an affair.

Years later, Alex meets Ashraf, gifts him a copy of Aesop's Fables and informs him that he has recognized the Boy Who Cried Wolf strategy. Ashraf responds that no matter what happened, if peace came out of it, everyone is better off.

An epilogue states that Ashraf died mysteriously in 2007 when he fell from the balcony of his London flat. He is the only man to be recognized as a national hero in both Israel and Egypt.

== Cast ==
- Marwan Kenzari as Ashraf Marwan, an Egyptian diplomat, who is the son-in-law of President Nasser
- Toby Kebbell as Alex, a relatively inexperienced Canadian-Israeli Mossad handler whose real name is Danny Ben Aroya
- Sasson Gabai as Anwar Sadat, Vice President and later President of Egypt
- Waleed Zuaiter as Gamal Abdel Nasser, long-serving President of Egypt and father-in-law of Marwan
- Ori Pfeffer as Zvi Zamir, director of the Mossad
- Maisa Abd Elhadi as Mona Marwan, Ashraf's wife and daughter of President Nasser
- Hannah Ware as Diana Ellis, an English actress
- Tsahi Halevi as Muammar Gaddafi, the leader of Libya
- Guy Adler as Gideon Vromen, a Mossad agent tasked with following Ashraf
- Mickey Leon as Judah Hornstein, an experienced Mossad handler
- Slimane Dazi as Sami Sharaf, Minister for Presidential Affairs under Nasser
- Mounir Margoum as Babak, a friend of Sami Sharaf who stays loyal to him after his imprisonment
- Mali Levi as Natalie Ben Aroya, Alex/Danny's wife

== Production ==
On 5 May 2017, it was announced that Marwan Kenzari was set to star in The Angel for director Ariel Vromen from a screenplay by David Arata, with Netflix distributing the film.

The film began production in early July 2017 in London, and also was shot elsewhere in the United Kingdom, as well as Bulgaria, and Morocco. The rest of the cast was confirmed on 25 July 2017, with the film in principal production.

== Release ==
The film was released on 14 September 2018, although originally it was scheduled for 15 June 2018.

== Historical accuracy and new investigations ==
In 2025 an investigation revealed that some Israeli media concluded Marwan was part of an Egyptian deception plan. Countering the events of the film. Marwan was not a double agent who helped save Israel during the war, according to the investigation by Israeli journalists, the report states that previously hidden files suggest Marwan may have been the spearhead of Egyptian deception and not a loyal Israeli asset.

== Reception ==
=== Critical response ===
On the review aggregator website Rotten Tomatoes, 67% of 12 critics' reviews are positive, with an average rating of 7.3/10.
