= Alexandra Dinu =

Romanian actress and television presenter

Alexandra Dinu (born 3 January 1981) is a Romanian actress and television presenter. Her most notable roles are Tatiana in Final Score, Grace in Bullet Head and Agent Rossi in 211.

== Early life, family and education ==
Dinu was born in Bucharest, Romania. She studied at the Jean Monnet language school in Bucharest.

== Career ==
Her first appearance on television was as a host in 1999 as part of a program for Romanian TVR2 and, shortly after for TVR1. As an actress, Dinu is known in Europe for Second-Hand (2005), Garcea si oltenii (2001) and Examen (2003).

In 2017 Dinu appeared in Bullet Head, a crime thriller starring Adrien Brody, Antonio Banderas, and John Malkovich. She appeared with Dave Batista and Pierce Brosnan in action film Final Score, set during the final match played by West Ham United at their Boleyn Ground preposterously hosting a European semi-final, as Tatiana, a terrorist kidnapper.

Dinu appears as Agent Ross in 211 with Nicolas Cage. A film written and directed by Roberto Leoni entitled The Serpent's Gift, in which she participated together with Dinu and Guglielmo Scilla, will be released in 2020.

== Personal life ==
From 2000 to 2003, she was married to the footballer Adrian Mutu with whom she has a son, Mario. Mutu said the depression he fell into following his divorce from Dinu led to the cocaine use which caused his sacking by Chelsea FC in 2004, despite first claiming he only failed a drugs test due to supplements designed to improve his sexual performance.
