= Dig (2015 TV series) =

- Genre: Action; Adventure; Drama
- Created by: Tim Kring; Gideon Raff
- Starring: Jason Isaacs; Anne Heche; Ori Pfeffer; Alison Sudol; Omar Metwally; Regina Taylor; David Costabile; Angela Bettis; Richard E. Grant; Lauren Ambrose
- Country of origin: United States
- Original languages: English; Hebrew
- No. of seasons: 1
- No. of episodes: 10

Production
- Executive producers: Tim Kring; Gideon Raff; Alon Shtruzman; Gail Berman; Karni Ziv; Gene Stein; Avi Nir; Lloyd Braun
- Producers: Michael Wray; Jenna Santoianni; Liat Benasuly Amit
- Production companies: Tailwind Productions; G. Raff Productions; The Jackal Group; Keshet International; Universal Cable Productions

Original release
- Network: USA Network
- Release: March 5 – May 7, 2015

Dig is an American mystery/action-thriller television miniseries that premiered on USA Network on March 5, 2015, and ran until May 7. Created by Gideon Raff and Tim Kring, it stars Jason Isaacs as FBI Agent Peter Connelly and Anne Heche as Lynn Monahan, Peter's boss and occasional lover. When Peter investigates the murder of a young American in Jerusalem, he uncovers an international conspiracy thousands of years in the making. The series also stars Alison Sudol, David Costabile, Regina Taylor, Lauren Ambrose, Angela Bettis, and Ori Pfeffer. On May 12, 2015, USA Network cancelled Dig.

== Premise ==
The story focuses on an FBI agent who is based in Jerusalem and discovers a plot that dates back 2000 years while investigating a murder. The focus is on the prophetic return of the Jewish temple.

== Cast ==
- Jason Isaacs as FBI Special Agent Peter Connelly
- Anne Heche as Special Agent in Charge Lynn Monahan, FBI Legal Attache, plus Peter's boss who uses him for her pleasures
- Ori Pfeffer as Detective Golan Cohen
- Melinda Page Hamilton as Sandra
- Alison Sudol as Emma Wilson
- Regina Taylor as Ambassador Ruth Ridell
- David Costabile as Tad Billingham
- Richard E. Grant as Ian Margrove
- Lauren Ambrose as Debbie Morgan
- Asi Cohen as Shem
- Angela Bettis as Fay

== Production ==
The series is produced by Universal Cable Productions. It began filming in Jerusalem, but then moved production to Dubrovnik, Pula, Split and Trogir, Croatia and later to Albuquerque, New Mexico, due to the 2014 Israel–Gaza conflict. Isaacs stated that when the show was originally written the entire premise was around shooting in Jerusalem.

== Episodes ==
Six episodes of Dig were originally picked up for the miniseries, but this was later upped to ten episodes.

No.	Title	Directed by	Written by	Original release date	U.S. viewers (millions)
1	"Pilot"	SJ Clarkson	Tim Kring & Gideon Raff	March 5, 2015	1.83
A red heifer is born in Norway. Peter Connelly begins investigating the death of a young archaeology student who is searching for the Ark of the Covenant, whom he met while chasing a Palestinian Christian. A young boy named Josh runs away from an apparent cult in New Mexico.
2	"Catch You Later"	Gideon Raff	Tim Kring & Gideon Raff	March 12, 2015	1.45
Cohen deduces that Peter is the man who was with Emma the night she was killed. Avram begins his journey to Jerusalem with the red heifer. Debbie discovers another young boy named Josh, and he attends his Bar Mitzvah. Yusuf delivers the stone to the American ambassador.
3	"Meet the Rosenbergs"	Gideon Raff	Tim Kring & Gideon Raff	March 19, 2015	1.43
4	"Prayer of David"	Gideon Raff	Carol Barbee	March 26, 2015	1.34
5	"Emma Wilson's Father"	Gideon Raff	Bradford Winters	April 2, 2015	0.93
6	"The Well of Souls"	Allan Arkush	Tim Kring & Gideon Raff	April 9, 2015	0.95
7	"Trust No One"	Millicent Shelton	Barry O'Brien	April 16, 2015	1.08
8	"Sisters of Dinah"	Millicent Shelton	Jesse Peyronel & Sharon Hoffman	April 23, 2015	0.94
9	"Jehoshaphat"	Gideon Raff	Carol Barbee & Bradford Winters	April 30, 2015	1.09
10	"Armageddon Protocol"	Gideon Raff	Tim Kring & Gideon Raff	May 7, 2015	1.05
