= Spy Game =

2001 action thriller film directed by Tony Scott

- Theatrical release poster
- Directed by: Tony Scott
- Screenplay by: Michael Frost Beckner; David Arata
- Story by: Michael Frost Beckner
- Produced by: Douglas Wick; Marc Abraham
- Starring: Robert Redford; Brad Pitt; Catherine McCormack; Stephen Dillane; Larry Bryggman
- Cinematography: Dan Mindel
- Edited by: Christian Wagner
- Music by: Harry Gregson-Williams
- Production companies: Beacon Pictures; Red Wagon
- Distributed by: Universal Pictures (Note: Co-distributed in Germany with United International Pictures)
- Release dates: November 21, 2001 (U.S.); November 23, 2001 (UK); December 15, 2001 (Japan); January 9, 2002 (France); March 14, 2002 (Germany)
- Running time: 126 minutes
- Countries: United States; France; United Kingdom; Germany; Japan
- Language: English
- Budget: $115 million
- Box office: $143 million

Spy Game is a 2001 American action thriller film directed by Tony Scott and starring Robert Redford and Brad Pitt as CIA operatives during the last days of the Cold War. It was released in the United States on November 21, 2001, and grossed $143 million on a $115 million budget. It received mostly positive reviews from critics.

== Plot ==
In 1991, the United States and China are close to a major trade agreement, with the President due to visit China to seal the deal. The Central Intelligence Agency (CIA) learns that its asset Tom Bishop has been arrested at a People's Liberation Army prison in Suzhou and will be executed in 24 hours unless the U.S. government claims him and bargains for his release. Bishop's actions, unsanctioned by the CIA, risk jeopardizing the agreement. A group of CIA executives summons Nathan Muir, a veteran case officer and Bishop's mentor, who plans to retire from the Agency at the end of the day. While purportedly interviewing Muir to learn his history with Bishop, the executives seek a pretext for not intervening on Bishop's imprisonment. Unknown to them, Muir was tipped off about Bishop's capture by fellow CIA veteran Harry Duncan, the Hong Kong Station Chief.

Muir leaks the story to CNN through an MI6 contact, Digby 'Digger' Gibson in Hong Kong, believing that public pressure would force American intervention. They are stalled briefly before a phone call to the FCC from Deputy Director for Operations Charles Harker results in CNN retracting the story as a hoax. Through a series of flashbacks, it is revealed that Muir met Bishop in 1975 when Bishop was a United States Marine Corps Scout Sniper during the Vietnam War. Muir gave Bishop a mission to eliminate a high-ranking Laotian Army officer. Bishop and his spotter, Tran, assassinate the target despite being compromised, and Bishop downs a pursuing enemy attack helicopter. Bishop escorts the now wounded Tran to safety, impressing Muir. In 1976, Muir recruited Bishop as a CIA asset in West Berlin, where Bishop was tasked with procuring assets in East Germany. Then he discusses Bishop's spy work in Beirut in 1985, during the War of the Camps, which was their last mission together.

Bishop is troubled by Muir's conviction that civilian "assets" who endangered a mission should be sacrificed to preserve the "greater good." After Bishop attempts to countermand Muir during a mission to save the life of an asset, Muir emphasizes that he will not tolerate dissent, and would not rescue Bishop if he was captured going "off the reservation". During a mission in Lebanon, Bishop, posing as a photojournalist, meets relief worker Elizabeth Hadley. While using her to connect with an asset for the mission, they become romantically involved. Muir distrusts Hadley and reveals to Bishop that she was exiled from the United Kingdom. Hadley later confesses to Bishop that she was involved in the bombing of a Chinese building in Britain, which was supposed to be empty but contained Chinese nationals. Bishop reveals to Hadley his true identity. Muir elects again to sacrifice a civilian asset for the sake of their mission, and Bishop cuts professional ties with Muir. Muir, fearing that Hadley could threaten the Agency and potentially Bishop, makes a deal with the Chinese, exchanging Hadley in return for an arrested U.S. diplomat. Chinese agents kidnap Hadley, and a Dear John letter is forged and left for Bishop.

In the present, Muir realizes that Bishop went to China for Hadley. In a series of misdirections, he forges a directive signed by the Director of Central Intelligence to begin "Operation Dinner Out", a rescue mission spearheaded by a SEAL team that Bishop had developed as a "Plan B" for his own attempt at rescuing Hadley. Using $282,000 of his life savings and a misappropriated file on Chinese coastline satellite imagery, Muir enlists Duncan to assist him in bribing a Chinese energy official to cut power to the prison for 30 minutes, during which the SEAL rescue team will retrieve Bishop and Hadley. Harker is suspicious that Muir is working against the CIA, but when he confronts Muir before the gathered executives, Muir "confesses" to unprofessionally using the agency's resources to gather information about his intended retirement home, which he has distorted the evidence to support. Bishop is rescued along with Hadley and surmises that Muir was responsible for saving him when he hears the helicopter pilot refer to "Operation Dinner Out", which was also the code name for an operation Bishop used to get a birthday gift for Muir while they were in Lebanon. Muir leaves the CIA building and drives into the countryside, as CIA officials are belatedly informed of the rescue.

== Cast ==
- Robert Redford as Nathan Muir
- Brad Pitt as Tom Bishop
- Catherine McCormack as Elizabeth Hadley
- Stephen Dillane as Charles Harker, CIA Deputy Director for Operations
- Larry Bryggman as Troy Folger, CIA Deputy Director
- Charlotte Rampling as Anne Cathcart
- Michael Paul Chan as Vincent Vy Ngo
- Marianne Jean-Baptiste as Gladys Jennip
- Ken Leung as Li
- David Hemmings as Harry Duncan, CIA Hong Kong office

In addition, Garrick Hagon appears as CIA Director Cy Wilson. Benedict Wong appears as Tran. Amidou played Dr. Ahmed. Muir's date at a Berlin embassy Christmas party was uncredited and played by Hungarian actress Anita Deutsch.

== Production ==
An American–French–German–Japanese co-production, it was shot in Morocco and Budapest from November 5, 2000, to March 19, 2001. The film was originally to be directed by Mike van Diem. Brad Pitt passed on playing the title role in The Bourne Identity for this project. It made its worldwide premiere at the Mann National Theatre on November 19, 2001.

== Home video ==
Spy Game was released by Universal Studios Home Video on DVD and VHS on April 9, 2002. The film was released on Blu-ray on May 19, 2009.

== Reception ==
=== Box office ===
Spy Game grossed $62.4 million in the United States and Canada and $80.7 million in international markets, for a worldwide total of $143 million against a production budget of $115 million. The film opened at number three at the North American box office behind Monsters, Inc. and Harry Potter and the Sorcerer's Stone, earning $21.6 million during its opening weekend, combined with $30.6 million from its first five days. It remained in the domestic top ten for five consecutive weeks.

=== Critical response ===
On the review aggregator website Rotten Tomatoes, 64% of 135 critics' reviews are positive, with an average rating of 6.2/10. The website's consensus reads: " The outcome of the kinetic Spy Game is never in doubt, but it is fun watching Robert Redford and Brad Pitt work." Metacritic, which uses a weighted average, assigned the film a score of 63 out of 100, based on 29 critics, indicating "generally favorable" reviews. Audiences polled by CinemaScore gave the film an average grade of "B+" on an A+ to F scale.

Roger Ebert of the Chicago Sun-Times gave the film two and a half stars out of four and said, "It is not a bad movie, mind you; it's clever and shows great control of craft, but it doesn't care, and so it's hard for us to care about." Mike Clark of USA Today explained that "if you can't find a copy of Condor, you can learn everything you probably need to know about espionage by pairing Spy Game with Spy Kids." Steven Rea of The Philadelphia Inquirer stated that "fans of swooping helicopter shots, alleys filled with backlit geysers of steam, and jump-cut editing that makes MTV look like Ingmar Bergman will relish the intercontinental intrigue and huggermugger that is Spy Game." Dana Stevens of The New York Times explained that "the problem lies in the calculating pretentiousness of using human misery to make shallow entertainment seem serious. It's worth comparing Spy Game with The Tailor of Panama, John Boorman's far superior exercise in post-cold-war spycraft."

== Novels ==
In 2022, Michael Frost Beckner, the co-screenwriter of Spy Game, published a trilogy of novels featuring characters from the film: Muir’s Gambit, Bishop's Endgame, and Aiken in Check. The audiobook editions of the trilogy are narrated by Todd Boyce, who portrayed Aiken in the film.
