= Rx (film) =

- DVD cover
- Directed by: Ariel Vromen
- Written by: Morgan Land; Ariel Vromen
- Produced by: Mark Glickman; Rosanne Korenberg; Shawn Simon; Eric Balfour; Colin Hanks; Nicholas Simon; Andrew Zamfotis; Alton Walpole
- Starring: Eric Balfour; Colin Hanks; Lauren German
- Cinematography: Scott Kevan
- Edited by: Danny Rafic
- Music by: Gilad Benamram
- Production companies: Inscription Films; Sumatra Films
- Distributed by: Screen Media Ventures (all media); Screen Media Films (DVD)
- Release date: April 21, 2005 (RiverRun International Film Festival)
- Running time: 89 minutes
- Country: United States
- Language: English

Rx is a 2005 romantic thriller film directed by Ariel Vromen. It stars Eric Balfour, Colin Hanks, and Lauren German.

== Plot ==
Three American friends travel across the border to a secret outdoor party in Mexico. While there, they visit Jonny's drug dealer Pepe, an American who has set up a drug dealing business in Mexico. While they are waiting, a local mechanic named Carlos offers to fix a bump on their car but they decline the offer. Andrew uses $2,000 he stole from his fast food job to buy a large amount of pills. He explains that he needs money to solve his financial problems at home and Jonny offers to help him swallow the bags of pills out of sympathy.

While at the border crossing, Jonny experiences extreme pain from the bags rupturing in his stomach so Andrew quickly turns the car around and drives to a hospital but is too afraid to go inside. When Jonny dies in the car, Andrew and Melissa hide his body in the front storage compartment of the car.

They drive back to Pepe's to ask for something to flush out the pills in Andrew's stomach. Pepe gives Andrew muscle relaxers and gives Melissa a tranquilizer to relax, then forces them to wear costumes for his party. During the party, Andrew breaks into Pepe's stash room and steals all of his money, nearly $20,000. While attempting to leave, he is caught by Pepe's guard Raul, who demands to look in the front storage compartment of the car. He finds Jonny's body and accidentally shoots it, then he tells Andrew and Melissa to lie down and prepares to shoot them. Raul looks away to shout to Pepe and Andrew knocks him over with a shovel, then Andrew and Melissa escape to the car and drive away.

They hide Jonny's body in a blanket off a dirt road in the hills then drive to a hotel for the night. During the night, Andrew leaves and wakes up Carlos (as well as his mother) to help him fix the broken window on the car to avoid suspicion at the border. Melissa notices him leaving and she leaves with the car herself. Carlos informs Pepe and Raul, who show up and beat Andrew, demanding the money. He says that it is in the car but they are unable to find the car there and assume that Melissa has intentionally left with the money. When they find her at the border control, Andrew hits the gas pedal to cause a collision and get the attention of the police. The police arrest Pepe for holding a weapon and Andrew stops at Melissa's car to say goodbye then gives the stolen money to a young girl selling flowers. He is stopped by the police and told to get on the ground but when he lifts his shirt to expose his handgun he is shot and killed. Melissa continues across the border to the United States.

== Cast ==
- Eric Balfour as Andrew
- Colin Hanks as Jonny
- Lauren German as Melissa
- Danny Pino as Carlos
- Lulu Molina as Carlos's Mother
- Alan Tudyk as Pepe
- Ori Pfeffer as Raul
- Adrian DeLira as Roadblock Federal
- Jacob Duran as Indigent Man
- Kei Kei Cadena as Young Mexican Woman
- Arturo Portillo as Mexican Soldier at Cantina
- Hector Radela as Mexican Soldier at Cantina
- Alexandra Magallanes as Little Girl at Border
- Michael Baldonado as Mexican Border Officer
- Rudy Pérez as Mexican Border Officer
- Rio Alexander as Border Peddler
- Anthony Escobar as Drunk Man at Border
- Rafaela Graffos as Mexican Woman at Border
- Guy Camilleri as US Customs Official
- Richard Barela as Hospital Visitor
- Patricia DeLozier as Raver
- Stephen Eiland as Carmen Miranda
- Lady Victoria Hervey as Daisy
- Kristi Kountz as Raver
- Chance Romero as Raver
- Dyron C. Thompson as Raver - Angel of Death
- Robert Douglas Washington as Todd McIntire

== Production ==
Some filming took place in Albuquerque and Sunland Park, New Mexico. During that time, the film was being produced under the working title RX Sin Receta.

== Release ==
The film premiered at the RiverRun International Film Festival on April 21, 2005. It was released on DVD in the Netherlands on October 25, 2005, in Germany on February 2, 2006, and in the United States on January 30, 2007. The film was released in some regions outside of the US under the alternative title Simple Lies.

== Reception ==
David Cornelius of eFilmCritic.com gave the film 2/5 and wrote: "What begins as an intriguing, intimate, even surprising drama turns midway into a lousy, hackneyed, too-hip-for-its-own-good thriller."
