= Danika (film) =

- DVD cover
- Directed by: Ariel Vromen
- Written by: Joshua Leibner
- Produced by: Lorena David; John Parenteau; Mark A. Roberts
- Starring: Marisa Tomei; Regina Hall; Craig Bierko; Kyle Gallner; Nicki Prian; Ridge Canipe; Bailey Hughes
- Cinematography: Darko Suvak
- Edited by: Danny Rafic
- Music by: Gilad Benamram
- Distributed by: First Look Studios
- Release date: December 26, 2006
- Running time: 79 minutes
- Country: United States
- Language: English

Danika is a 2006 psychological thriller film directed by Israeli director Ariel Vromen. It stars Marisa Tomei, Craig Bierko and Regina Hall. The film was released on DVD in the US on December 26, 2006.

== Plot ==
Danika Merrick suffers from increasingly disturbing, paranoid hallucinations. Most of her hallucinations involve threats to her family and media-fuelled fears such as child kidnappings, car accidents, her children lying and terrorism. Danika confides to her husband, Randy, and Evelyn, her psychiatrist.

Danika continues to have increasingly paranoid hallucinations due to schizophrenia, including seeing a little girl in front of the bank where she works being pulled away by a suspicious-looking man as she asks Danika to help her. Later, Danika does nothing only to watch in horror as the same little girl's mother appears on the news begging for her child's safe return. Danika, apologizing for being late to work, is scolded by her bank manager about incorrect calculations. Her manager leaves the office, instructing Danika to remain there until errors are corrected. Danika then witnesses a bank robbery in progress with two trigger-happy robbers shooting anyone who moves. The alarm activates, and the robbers force Danika's boss to tell them where the security monitors are located. The manager points to her office where a shivering Danika seeks shelter in a corner. As the door opens, she expects to come face to face with a gun-toting bank robber, but is confronted by her manager who wonders what is wrong with her.

Danika also finds a human head in a grocery bag as she's putting the groceries in the refrigerator. She's oblivious as, standing in front of the school looking for her daughter who ran off, her daughter's teacher is killed by falling glass (it turns out it's the same person's head she found in the grocery bag a day before). She also believes her son's partner for a school assignment is trying to give him AIDS after she imagines the girl crawling into her bed and confessing she is dying from AIDS and is going to give it to Danika's son.

It is revealed that Danika was in a car accident years earlier while driving her young children home and she makes a side visit to see Randy. The accident occurred immediately after Danika found out he was having an extramarital affair with the children's nanny, Evelyn, in a motel shower. Danika's vision of the nanny is that of her psychiatrist who's been treating her, revealing they were one and the same. During the confrontation, Evelyn reveals that she shares Randy's concerns over Danika's recent paranoia and her overprotective behavior is dangerous to the children. She also mentions that her family deserves better and that Danika needs to seek professional psychiatric help for her delusions. She responds by attacking Randy with a mirror shard and cutting his face. Before leaving, Danika pushes Evelyn to the bathroom wall and tells her that she's not only fired, but also stay away from her family. She drives away from the motel home with the children in tow. After witnessing Randy's affair with Evelyn, Danika psychologically broke down and ran a red light, causing her car to be hit by a school bus. In the car accident, all of Danika's children died, leaving Danika as the sole survivor. It can be assumed that, when he found out about the tragic deaths of their children, Randy blamed the accident on Danika for having not listened to him and Evelyn when they told her to seek professional help for her delusions. It is also implied that he divorces her and Danika never sees him again.

Danika's life after the accident is revealed. As a homeless woman, she sits on a bench at the scene where the accident occurred, presumably reliving the events of that day every day out of guilt. All the events after the accident — reuniting with her husband and raising her children to adulthood, are an alternate world that Danika created to escape from her reality. They are caused by the tremendous guilt she feels for running the red light that led to her children's deaths. It's also implied that Danika has regrets over having not listened to Randy and Evelyn when they told her to seek psychiatric help that led to where she is now. She dejectedly gets up from the bench and slowly walks away pushing a shopping cart filled with her children's belongings and her rosary.

== Cast ==
- Marisa Tomei as Danika Merrick
- Craig Bierko as Randy Merrick
- Regina Hall as Dr. Evelyn Harris
- James Avery as Teddy Johnson
- Akuyoe Graham as Patricia Guilford
- Kyle Gallner as Kurt Merrick
- Nicki Prian as Lauren Merrick
- Ridge Canipe as Brian Merrick
- Hannah Marks as Lizzie Geralds
- Danay Garcia as Myra
- Tess Lina as Mrs. Zachary

== Background ==
The film was directed by Ariel Vromen and written by Joshua Leibner. Danika's budget is estimated to be $5,000,000.

=== Release ===
Danika saw its world premiere at the 2006 CineVegas Film Festival in Las Vegas.

=== Reception ===
On Rotten Tomatoes the film holds an approval rating of 29% based on 7 reviews, with an average rating of 5.2/10.

=== Accolades ===
At the San Diego Film Festival in 2006, the film picked up awards for "Best Feature Film" and "Best Actress" (Regina Hall).
