= Eric Balfour =

American actor (born 1977)

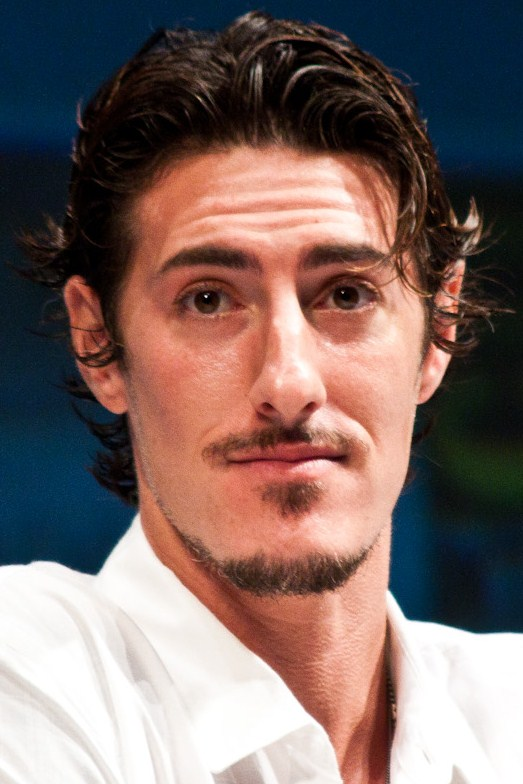
- Balfour in 2010
- Born: Eric Salter Balfour; April 24, 1977 (age 49); Los Angeles, California, U.S.
- Occupation: Actor
- Years active: 1991–present
- Spouse: Erin Chiamulon (m. 2015)
- Children: 3

Eric Salter Balfour (born April 24, 1977) is an American actor. He made his film debut in the Lifetime movie No One Would Tell in 1996, followed by the drama Shattered Image (1998), followed by roles in What Women Want (2000), The Texas Chainsaw Massacre (2003), and Rise of the Gargoyles (2009). His roles on television include Milo Pressman on the action-thriller TV series 24, a recurring role in the drama Six Feet Under as Gabriel Dimas, Duke Crocker in Haven, Eddie on The OC, and as Boone in Country Comfort.

== Early life ==
Balfour was born to a Jewish family in Los Angeles, California, the son of David Balfour, a chiropractor, and Sharon (née Salter), who works as a marriage and family counselor. He has a younger sister.

He described his household growing up as "creative" and said that his family often made trips to the Esalen Institute in Big Sur, California.

== Career ==
Balfour appeared on the kids TV show Kids Incorporated for one season in 1991. During the early 1990s, he had a variety of minor juvenile roles on television series such as Dr. Quinn, Medicine Woman, Arresting Behavior, Boy Meets World and Step by Step. In 1997, he appeared in the first two episodes of Buffy the Vampire Slayer as Jesse McNally, one of the show's first victims. Eric was a regular on the HBO series Six Feet Under as Gabriel Dimas in 2001. He appeared as a regular cast member in three short-lived TV shows. Veritas: The Quest was cancelled after four episodes in 2003, Hawaii was canceled after seven episodes in 2004, and Sex, Love & Secrets was canceled after four episodes. Also in 2005, Balfour starred in the sexually explicit Canadian drama Lie with Me with Lauren Lee Smith. In March 2006, Balfour debuted as Brian Peluso on producer Dick Wolf's crime drama Conviction, which lasted one season. Balfour was also a guest star on the hit show Dawson's Creek in the ninth episode of the first season.

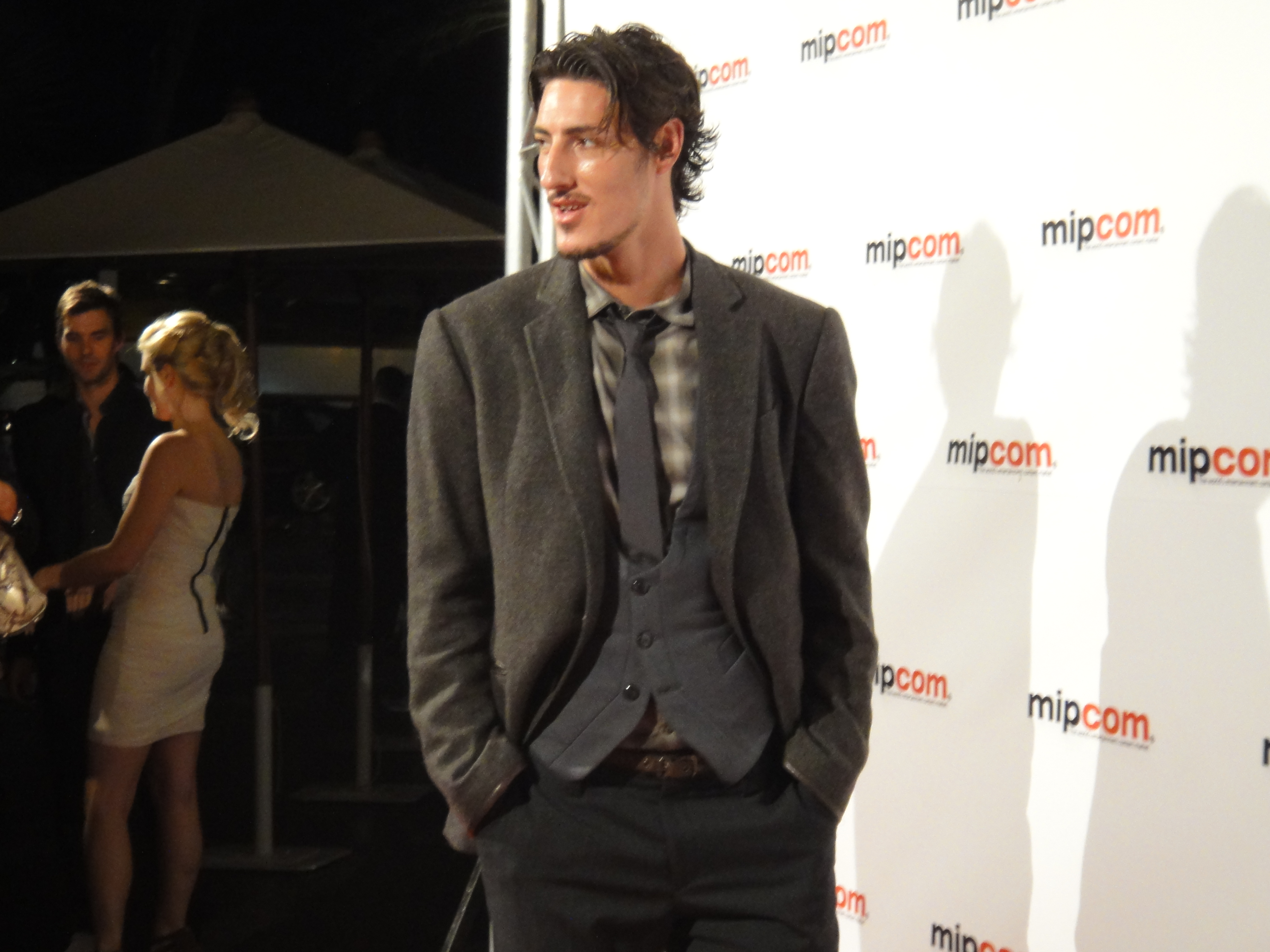
Balfour in October 2010

He starred in the 2003 remake of The Texas Chainsaw Massacre with Jessica Biel. He played a minor character in several episodes of The O.C. as Eddie, Theresa's fiancé.

Balfour appeared in seven episodes of the first season of 24 as computer technician Milo Pressman in 2001. Five years later, Balfour reprised the role for 19 episodes of 24's sixth season before leaving the show by his own request. Balfour appeared in Life on Mars as Eddie Carling, the brother of detective Ray Carling.

He was the face for the Valentino male fragrance Valentino V. In September 2009, Balfour appeared in an episode of Monk. In the same month, Balfour booked a recurring role on the drama show The Beautiful Life, but the show was canceled after its second episode. In 2010, he starred in the Strause Brothers thriller film Skyline. He starred as Duke Crocker on the Syfy drama Haven. Balfour co-starred with Missy Peregrym and Jeff Roop in the survival film Backcountry, and he appeared as Spiro Dalon in an episode of Chicago P.D.

== Personal life ==
After five years of dating, Balfour married fashion designer Erin Chiamulon on May 30, 2015, in Pacific Palisades, California. Balfour and his wife had a son on August 2, 2018. In May 2022, Balfour and his wife welcomed their second son. In March 2026, they welcomed a third son.

== Filmography ==
=== Film ===
Year	Title	Role	Notes
1996	Shattered Image	Greg	
1997	Trojan War	Kyle	
1998	Can't Hardly Wait	Hippie Guy	
1999	Scrapbook	Andy Martin	
2000	What Women Want	Cameron	
2001	Rain	Pvt. Morris	
2001	America's Sweethearts	Security Guard	
2003	Secondhand Lions	Sheik's Grandson	
2003	The Texas Chainsaw Massacre	Kemper	
2004	Face of Terror	Saleem Haddad	
2005	Be Cool	Derek	Scenes deleted
2005	Rx	Andrew	a.k.a. Simple Lies
2005	Lie with Me	David	
2005	In Her Shoes	Grant	
2006	The Elder Son	Skip	
2008	Hell Ride	Comanche / Bix	
2008	The Spirit	Mahmoud	
2009	Spread	Sean	
2009	Horsemen	Taylor	
2010	Beatdown	Victor	
2010	Skyline	Jarrod	
2011	The Legend of Hell's Gate: An American Conspiracy	Will Edwards	
2011	Do Not Disturb	Frank	Segment: "Rocketman"
2011	Cell 213	Michael Grey	
2014	Backcountry	Brad	
2016	Little Dead Rotting Hood	Sheriff Adam	
2016	Fashionista	Randall	
2016	Tao of Surfing	Dayne	
2017	200 Degrees	Ryan Hinds	
2018	Agenda Payback	Peter Farrell	
2020	Timecrafters: The Treasure Of Pirate's Cove	Pistol	
2021	The Runner	Local Legend	

=== Television ===
Year	Title	Role	Notes
1991	Kids Incorporated	Eric	Main role (Season 7)
1992	Arresting Behavior	Billy Ruskin	Recurring role
1993	Bloodlines: Murder in the Family	Matt	TV film
1993	Danger Theatre	Teenager #2	Episode: "An Old Friend for Dinner"
1993	Step by Step	Michael Fielder	Episode: "Never on Sunday"
1993–1994	Dr. Quinn, Medicine Woman	Benjamin Avery	Episodes: "The Incident", "Just One Lullaby"
1994	Animaniacs	Jared	Voice roles (2 episodes)
1995	Boy Meets World	Tommy	Episode: "Pop Quiz"
1995	Kirk	Zack	Episode: "The Crush"
1996	Champs	Danny	Episode: "For Art's Sake"
1996	No One Would Tell	Vince Fortner	TV film
1996	Townies	Adam	Episode: "The Good Job"
1997	Ink	Danny	Episode: "Devil in a Blue Dress"
1997	Buffy the Vampire Slayer	Jesse	Episodes: "Welcome to the Hellmouth", "The Harvest"
1997	Clueless	Pizza Boy	Episode: "Salsa, Chlorine & Tears"
1998	Dawson's Creek	Warren Goering	Episode: "Road Trip"
1999	Nash Bridges	Cliff Morehouse	Episode: "Shoot the Moon"
1999	The West Wing	Frat Boy #3	Episode: "Mr. Willis of Ohio"
2000	Chicago Hope	Jason Kerns	Episode: "Hanlon's Choice"
2001	FreakyLinks	Chapin Demetrius	Episode: "Subject: Live Fast, Die Young"
2001	The Chronicle	Mark Griffin	Episode: "Only the Young Die Good"
2001	NYPD Blue	Charles 'Spyder' Price / Eli Beardsley	Episodes: "Peeping Tommy", "Two Clarks in a Bar"
2001–2002, 2007	24	Milo Pressman	Recurring role (season 1); Main role (season 6)
2001–2003	Six Feet Under	Gabe Dimas	Recurring role
2003–2004	Veritas: The Quest	Calvin Banks	Main role
2004	Fearless	Ryan	TV pilot
2004	The O.C.	Eddie	Episodes: "The Telenovela", "The Goodbye Girl", "The Nana"
2005	Sex, Love & Secrets	Charlie Tibideaux	Main role
2006	Conviction	A.D.A. Brian Peluso	Main role
2008	The Ex List	Johnny Diamont	Episode: "Pilot"
2009	Fear Itself	Maxwell	Episode: "Echoes"
2009	Life on Mars	Eddie Carling	Episode: "The Dark Side of the Mook"
2009	Rise of the Gargoyles	Prof. Jack Randall	TV film
2009	Law & Order: Criminal Intent	Max Goodwin	Episode: "Salome in Manhattan"
2009	Monk	Lenny Barlowe	Episode: "Mr. Monk Is Someone Else"
2009	Valemont	Eric Gracen	Main role
2009	Rise of the Gargoyles	Prof. Jack Randall	TV film
2010	Dinoshark	Trace McGraw	TV film
2010	Saving Grace	Jesus	Episode: "Loose Men in Tight Jeans"
2010–2015	Haven	Duke Crocker	Main role
2011	No Ordinary Family	Lucas Winnick	Episodes: "No Ordinary Love", "No Ordinary Animal"
2012	Christine	Daniel	Recurring role
2013	The Eric Andre Show	Himself	Guest role
2016	Ray Donovan	Nick	Episode: "Norman Saves the World"
2017	A Midsummer's Nightmare	Mark	TV film
2018	Chicago P.D.	Spiro Dalon	Episode: "Fathers and Sons"
2019	Conversations in L.A.	Blaine	Episode: "Carmel by the sea"
2020–2021	Charmed	Julian Shea	Recurring role
2021	Country Comfort	Boone	Recurring role
2022	The Offer	Dean Tavoularis	Miniseries
2023	Wilderness	Garth	Miniseries
2025	Hacks	Ethan Sommers	Episode: "A Slippery Slope"
2026	NCIS: Origins	Vlad Volkinov	Episodes: "Don't You Forget About Me", "Return of the Mack"
2026	The Drop: A Snowfall Saga	Leonard Vance	Recurring role
