= Rise of the Gargoyles =

- DVD cover
- Genre: Horror; Action
- Written by: Andy Briggs
- Directed by: Bill Corcoran
- Starring: Eric Balfour; Caroline Néron; Justin Salinger; Ifan Huw Dafydd; Nick Mancuso; Tanya Clarke
- Theme music composer: Ned Bouhalassa
- Countries of origin: United States; France; Canada; Romania
- Original language: English

Production
- Producers: François Sylvestre; Andreea Stanculeanu
- Cinematography: Pierre Jodoin
- Editor: Simon Webb
- Running time: 94 minutes
- Production companies: Media Pro Pictures; Muse Entertainment Enterprises; RHI Entertainment
- Budget: $2,000,000

Original release
- Network: Syfy
- Release: June 21, 2009

Rise of the Gargoyles (La fureur des gargouilles in France) is a 2009 television film directed by Bill Corcoran and produced for the Syfy channel. It is the eighteenth film in the Maneater film series.

== Plot ==
In Paris, France, two workers find a hidden chamber while digging beneath the Saint Jean André Church. They collect the valuable objects in the area, but they are attacked by a creature. Meanwhile, the discredited Professor Jack Randall, who wrote a book about gargoyles rejected by the experts, is encouraged by his friend Carol Beckham to check the place out. They sneak into the site during the night and while Carol is collecting some artifacts, Jack is recording with his camera. Out of the blue, Jack sees a winged monster coming towards him and he flees from the location with Carol but breaks his camera. They go to a bar and a huge stone falls over onto his car. Jack takes a cab to his boarding house and Carol is attacked and beheaded by a gargoyle at her apartment.

The next morning, Jack identifies Carol's body and becomes the prime suspect of Inspector Gibert in several murders. Jack decides to seek out the reporter of a sensationalist newspaper, Nicole Ricard, and gives his tape to her cameraman Walsh. When Walsh recovers the badly damaged footage, he shows Nicole and they realize that Jack is not crazy, and he had indeed seen a gargoyle beneath the church. They decide to return to the church to investigate.

== Cast ==
- Eric Balfour as Professor Jack Randall
- Caroline Néron as Nicole Ricard
- Justin Salinger as Walsh
- Ifan Huw Dafydd as Inspector Gibert
- Nick Mancuso as Father Gable
- Tanya Clarke as Carol Beckham
- Constantin Barbulescu as Workman #1
- Gabriel Spahiu as Workman #2
- Lucian Ciurariu as Bum
- Alexandra Buza as Rock Chick
- Flaviu Crisan as CSI Officer
- Paul Niculita as Gibert's Assistant
- Florin Busuioc as Cop
- Mihai Diaconu as Pizza Man
- Benoît Rousseau as Inspector Gibert (voice)

== Home media ==
Rise of the Gargoyles was released on DVD on September 8, 2009, in North America. In Japan, it was titled as: U.M.A 2010 and released on January 8, 2010 on direct-to-DVD.
