= Michael I. Handel =

Israeli-American academic and writer

- Born: c. 1943; Israel
- Died: June 14, 2001; Portsmouth, Rhode Island, US
- Education: Harvard University
- Known for: Military analysis
- Notable work: Masters of War (1992)

Michael I. Handel (c. 1943 - 2001) was an authority on military strategic surprise and Karl von Clausewitz, a military strategist who helped plan the Gulf War, and author of numerous books, chapters, and articles on military strategy.

== Background ==
Michael I. Handel was born in Israel circa 1943. In 1974, he earned a doctorate from Harvard University in 1974.

== Career ==
In the early 1980s, Handel became a professor at the US Army War College in Carlisle, Pa. In 1990, he became a professor at the US Naval War College in Newport, RI, where he remained until his death.

In 1986, Handel and Christopher Andrew co-founded Intelligence and National Security, a peer-reviewed academic journal focused on the role of intelligence in international relations and politics; it was the first academic journal to publish research on intelligence's role in national security and international affairs

In 1990, Handel served as military advisor to the Pentagon in planning the Gulf War. Based on his analysis strategic deception, US forces surprised the Iraqi army with false attack by sea while actually attacking by land.

== Personal life and death ==
Michael I. Handel died age 58 on June 14, 2001, of cancer in Portsmouth, RI.

== Legacy ==
In 2003, Richard K. Betts and Thomas Mahnken The Paradox of Intelligence: Essays in Memory of Michael I. Handel in honor of his contributions.

== Works ==
Handel was an expert on Karl von Clausewitz, and in his book Masters of War compared von Clausewitz's ideas to Sun Tzu, Mao Tse-tung, and Niccolo Machiavelli.

Books

- Masters of war: Sun tzu, Clausewitz, and Jomini (1992)
- Weak states in the international system (1990)
- War, strategy, and intelligence (1989)
- Military deception in peace and war (1985)
- The diplomacy of surprise : Hitler, Nixon, Sadat (1981)
- War termination, a critical survey (1978)
- Israel's political-military doctrine (1973)

Books edited

- Strategic and operational deception in the Second World War (1987)
