= Egyptian Council for Foreign Affairs =

Egypt-based think tank and NGO

- Abbreviation: ECFA
- Formation: 1999
- Type: Non-governmental organization
- Headquarters: Cairo, Egypt
- Website: www.ecfa-egypt.org

The Egyptian Council for Foreign Affairs (ECFA) is a not-for-profit, non-governmental organization based in Cairo, Egypt. The organization was established in 1999 with the objective of promoting public debate about foreign policy issues and international relations.

== Structure and membership ==
The Egyptian Council for Foreign Affairs is governed by a board of directors composed of diplomats, academics, military personnels, businessmen, writers and public figures. Membership is open to Egyptian individuals and organizations, who must be approved by the board on the recommendation of the Membership Committee.

== Activities and initiatives ==
The Egyptian Council for Foreign Affairs is responsible for hosting conferences and workshops, publishing research papers, policy briefs and books, collaborating with global and regional entities and encouraging the participation of young people in the public debate of foreign affairs.

== See also ==
- Egyptian Ministry of Foreign Affairs
- League of Arab States
- African Union
