= Method Man filmography =

This is a filmography of Grammy Award-winning rap artist Method Man, who is also an actor. In his film and TV work, he's sometimes credited as Cliff 'Method Man' Smith.

== Actor ==
=== Film ===
Year	Title	Role	Notes
1996	The Great White Hype	Himself	
1997	One Eight Seven	Dennis Broadway	
1997	Cop Land	Shondel	
1998	Belly	Shameek	
1999	Black and White	Himself	
1999	P.I.G.S.	Panhandling Nun	Short
2000	Boricua's Bond	-	
2001	Volcano High	Mr. Ma (voice)	
2001	How High	Silas P. Silas	
2002	Brown Sugar	Himself	
2003	Scary Movie 3	Himself	
2004	My Baby's Daddy	No Good	
2004	Garden State	Diego	
2004	Soul Plane	Muggsy	
2005	Venom	Deputy Turner	
2006	The Heart Specialist	Lorenzo	
2006	Hood of Horror	Himself	
2008	The Wackness	Percy	
2008	Meet the Spartans	Persian Emissary	
2010	Sinners and Saints	Weddo	
2011	The Indestructible Jimmy Brown	Himself	Short
2011	The Mortician	The Mortician	
2011	The Sitter	Jacolby	
2012	Red Tails	Sticks	
2013	Focus: A Dontae Hawkins Film	Vaughn's Father	Short
2014	The Cobbler	Leon Ludlow	
2015	#Lucky Number	Tyson "The Saint" St. Jones	
2015	Staten Island Summer	Konko	
2015	Trainwreck	Temembe	
2016	Keanu	Cheddar	
2016	Paterson	Himself	
2017	Where's the Money	Trap	
2017	Love Beats Rhymes	Ref	
2018	Future World	Tattooed Face	
2018	Peppermint	Narcotics Detective Baker	
2019	Shaft	Freddie P	
2019	Jay and Silent Bob Reboot	Himself	
2020	Concrete Cowboy	Leroy	
2020	Vampires vs. the Bronx	Father Jackson	
2021	This Is the Night	Louis	
2022	Last Looks	Swag Dogggg	
2022	On the Come Up	Supreme	
2024	Bad Shabbos	Jordan	
2024	The 4:30 Movie	Cookie	
2025	Shadow Force	Marcus "Unc" Owens	
2025	Poetic License	James Cassidy	
2026	Relationship Goals	Jarrett Roy	
TBA	Sunny	Ruskin	Filming

=== Television ===
Year	Title	Role	Notes
1995	Soul Train	Himself	Episode: "Cameo/Men at Large/Method Man"
1996	Space Ghost Coast to Coast	Himself	Episode: "Surprise"
1997	Martin	Himself	Episode: "You Play Too Much"
1997	Beavis and Butt-Head	Himself	Episode: "Beavis and Butt-Head Do Thanksgiving"
1999	Station Zero	Himself	Episode: "Uptown, Baby"
1999–2000	Showtime at the Apollo	Himself	Recurring guest
2000	The Jamie Foxx Show	Himself	Episode: "Jamie in the Middle"
2001	Behind the Music	Himself	Episode: "The Notorious B.I.G."
2001	Oz	Carlton 'Tug' Daniels	Recurring cast: season 4
2001–02	MADtv	Gentry Abrams/Himself	2 episodes
2002	One on One	Himself	Episode: "Give'm an Inch, They'll Throw a Rave"
2002	Third Watch	C-Note	Episode: "Superheroes: Part 1"
2002	The Twilight Zone	Kneigh	Episode: "The Path"
2003	MC Battle	Himself/Judge	Main judge
2003	$2 Bill	Himself	Episode: "DMX, Method Man and Ludacris"
2003	The Twilight Zone	Kneigh	Episode: "The Path"
2003	Boston Public	Flash Master K	Episode: "Chapter Sixty-Five"
2003–08	The Wire	Melvin "Cheese" Wagstaff	Recurring cast: seasons 2-5
2004	Method & Red	Himself	Main cast
2005	The Fairly OddParents	Rapping Head Pixie (voice)	Episode: "School's Out! The Musical"
2006	Wildboyz	Himself	Episode: "California"
2006–10	CSI: Crime Scene Investigation	Drops	Guest cast: seasons 6-8 & 11
2007	The Bronx Bunny Show	Himself	Episode #1.4
2007	Law & Order: Special Victims Unit	Dennis "D" King	Episode: "Snitch"
2008	Access Granted	Himself	Episode: "Sundance"
2008	Burn Notice	Valentine	Episode: "Bad Blood"
2010	The Good Guys	Kenny Griffin	Episode: "Old Dogs"
2011	The Good Wife	Young Boxer	Episode: "Real Deal"
2014	Park Bench with Steve Buscemi	Himself	Episode: "Bench Rap"
2014	Chozen	Phantasm (voice)	Recurring cast
2014	Scorpion	Lucky	Episode: "Risky Business"
2014	Seasons of Love	Big Rob	TV movie
2015	Inside Amy Schumer	Himself	Episode: "Last Fuckable Day"
2015–17	Blue Bloods	Mario Hunt	Recurring cast: season 5, guest: season 7
2016	Difficult People	Himself	Episode: "Hashtag Cats"
2016	Luke Cage	Himself	Episode: "Soliloquy of Chaos"
2016	The Breaks	Daryl Van Putten Sr.	TV movie
2017	Wild 'N Out	Himself	Episode: "Vic Mensa/Method Man"
2017	The Chris Gethard Show	Himself	Episode: "Meth and Geth Talk About Death"
2017	Comic Book Men	Himself	Episode: "Method Man's Mego"
2017	Secret History of Comics	Himself	Episode: "Image Comics: Declaration of Independents"
2017	The Breaks	Daryl Van Putten Sr.	Recurring cast
2017	Rebel	Terrance 'TJ' Jenkins	Main cast
2017–19	Drop the Mic	Himself/Host	Main host
2017–19	The Deuce	Rodney	Recurring cast: seasons 1–2
2018	Hip-Hop Evolution	Himself	Episode: "New York State of Mind"
2018	Drunk History	Grandmaster Flash	Episode: "Game Changers"
2018	Orange Is the New Black	Cardboard Cutout	Episode: "Gordons"
2019	Martha & Snoop's Potluck Party Challenge	Himself	Episode: "Munchie Snackdown"
2019	The New Negroes	Himself	Episode: "Money"
2019	Wu-Tang Clan: Of Mics and Men	Himself	Main guest
2019	First Wives Club	Beast	Episode: "What Happens Upstate"
2019	Last Week Tonight with John Oliver	Himself	Episode: "Compounding Pharmacies"
2019–20	The Last O.G.	Green Eyes	Recurring cast: season 2, guest: season 3
2020	Teenage Bounty Hunters	Terrance Coin	Recurring cast
2020–24	Power Book II: Ghost	Davis MacLean	Main cast
2021	Marvel/Method	Himself/Host	Main host
2021	Godfather of Harlem	Sam Christian	Recurring cast: season 2
2021	Masters of the Universe: Revelation	Clamp Champ (voice)	Episode: "Cleaved in Twain"
2021–22	That Damn Michael Che	Doctor/Himself	Episode: "Dudley Gets Shot" & "Black Mediocrity"
2022	Impractical Jokers	Himself	Episode: "Method Man" & "Filming With the Stars"
2022	Carpool Karaoke	Himself	Episode: "Method Man & Chris Redd"
2023	Hard Knocks	Himself	Episode: "Hard Knocks: Training Camp with the New York Jets #1"
2023	Moon Girl and Devil Dinosaur	Torg (voice)	Episode: "Devil on Her Shoulder"
2023	Bupkis	Carnival Worker	Episode: "For Your Amusement"
2025	Poker Face	Brick	Episode: "The Big Pump"
2026	Diarra from Detroit	Royce	Episode: "The Initiated"
2026	A Different World	Coach Bryce Coles	

=== Podcasts ===
Year	Title	Role	Notes
2023	Yes We Cannabis	Jay Smoke (voice)	Recurring cast

=== Music videos ===
Year	Song	Artist
1994	"Heaven & Hell"	Raekwon & Ghostface Killah
1995	"Live Niguz"	Onyx
1995	"Somethin' 4 da Honeyz"	Montell Jordan
1995	"Liquid Swords"	GZA
1996	"All That I Got Is You"	Ghostface Killah featuring Mary J. Blige and Popa Wu
1996	"Camay"	Ghostface Killah featuring Raekwon and Cappadonna
1997	"G.O.D. Pt. III"	Mobb Deep
1997	"Next Lifetime"	Erykah Badu
2000	"Thong Song"	Sisqó
2000	"It's So Hard"	Big Pun featuring Donell Jones
2001	"Feelin' on Yo Booty"	R. Kelly
2004	"If I Ain't Got You"	Alicia Keys
2005	"Feel It in the Air"	Beanie Sigel featuring Melissa Jiménez
2008	"Part of Me"	Chris Cornell

=== Video games ===
Year	Title	Voice role
1999	Wu-Tang: Shaolin Style	Himself
2003	Def Jam Vendetta	Himself
2004	Def Jam: Fight for NY	Blaze
2006	Def Jam Fight for NY: The Takeover	Blaze
2007	Def Jam: Icon	Gooch
2017	Call of Duty: Infinite Warfare	Himself

=== Documentary ===
Year	Title
1995	Eyes on Hip Hop
1995	The Show
1997	Rhyme & Reason
2000	Backstage
2001	Street Life
2001	Xzibit: Restless Xposed
2002	Street Dreams
2002	Hip Hop VIPs
2003	Hip Hop Babylon 2
2003	Scarface: Origins of a Hip Hop Classic
2004	Beef II
2005	The MC: Why We Do It
2005	The Strip Club
2005	Letter to the President
2005	The Art of 16 Bars: Get Ya' Bars Up
2006	Pick Up the Mic
2006	Rock the Bells
2007	1 More Hit
2007	Notorious B.I.G. Bigger Than Life
2008	Street Bangaz
2008	Big Pun: The Legacy
2010	Wu Tang Saga
2010	Mics on Fire
2012	The Sunset Strip
2013	Dirty: Platinum Edition
2015	Stretch and Bobbito: Radio That Changed Lives
2016	Check the Rhyme
2021	Mary J. Blige's My Life
2022	Milestone Generations
