= The Man I Love (2026 film) =

2026 film by Ira Sachs

- Directed by: Ira Sachs
- Written by: Ira Sachs; Mauricio Zacharias
- Produced by: Scott McGehee David Siegel; Saïd Ben Saïd; Mike Spreter; Myriam Schroeter
- Starring: Rami Malek; Tom Sturridge; Rebecca Hall; Ebon Moss-Bachrach; Luther Ford
- Cinematography: Josée Deshaies
- Edited by: Affonso Gonçalves
- Production companies: Big Creek Projects; Assemble Media; Merino Films; SBS Productions
- Release date: May 20, 2026 (Cannes)
- Running time: 95 minutes
- Countries: United States; France
- Language: English

The Man I Love is a 2026 drama film directed by Ira Sachs, co-written with Mauricio Zacharias. The film stars Rami Malek, Tom Sturridge, Rebecca Hall, Ebon Moss-Bachrach, and Luther Ford. It follows a gay theater actor living in 1980s New York City as he navigates his life while being diagnosed with AIDS.

The film had its world premiere in the main competition of the 2026 Cannes Film Festival on May 20, where it competed for the Palme d'Or and the Queer Palm.

== Plot ==
Set in late 1980s New York City, the film follows Jimmy George, an actor facing death from AIDS. In an effort to live his remaining life to the fullest after being hospitalized for AIDS-related pneumonia, Jimmy is determined to put on a live performance of Michel Tremblay's Once Upon a Time in the East with his group, The Mechanicals. Jimmy's AIDS affects his acting as he is the only member of the troupe who still has to reference the script in rehearsals. The group frequently congregates in Jimmy's apartment, where he lives with his boyfriend Dennis, who takes on the responsibility of caring for him and making sure that he takes his AZT medication.

Leslie, who lives downstairs, introduces her new roommate Vincent to Jimmy. Vincent quickly becomes drawn to Jimmy, befriends his group, and the two of them begin a barely-concealed affair while Jimmy and Dennis are still together.

When Jimmy's sister Brenda comes to visit with her husband, Gene, and their son, Billy, she and Jimmy go out to a drag bar. Gene takes Billy to their hotel, and when Brenda returns at the end of the night, telling Gene how great it is to see Jimmy doing so well, Gene reminds her that his health is deteriorating.

Leslie confronts Vincent over his decision to be sexually intimate when he knows Jimmy has AIDS. Dennis confronts Vincent, scolding him for treating Jimmy's condition as a game.

While attending his parents' anniversary, Jimmy asks his nephew Billy to record a message for them. It begins as gratitude and evolves into confessions of Jimmy's vices. He doesn't spare the details, and Gene stops Billy from recording further once he overhears what's being said.

Returning to New York City, Jimmy and Vincent spend another night at a club together, culminating in them having sex. However, the next morning, Jimmy abruptly abandons Vincent at breakfast, to Vincent's dismay.

When the performance of Once Upon a Time in the East is finally set to begin, Jimmy has a neurological episode on stage, succumbing to his condition despite his desire to resist. Dennis takes Jimmy to the hospital, where it becomes clear that his condition is worsening. Dennis angrily reacts when a doctor suggests that Jimmy is not getting the proper care that he needs. They spend the night together as Dennis helps bathe Jimmy.

Some time later, Vincent is alone at a gay bar, where a newcomer to New York City flirts with him. It is implied that Jimmy has died. The two men eventually dance to Ronee Blakley's song "Lightning Over Water".

== Cast ==
- Rami Malek as Jimmy George, a celebrated theater actor working on a new project, despite his AIDS complications
- Tom Sturridge as Dennis, Jimmy's long-suffering but caring boyfriend
- Luther Ford as Vincent, Leslie's roommate who becomes Jimmy's new lover
- Rebecca Hall as Brenda, Jimmy's sister and Gene's wife
- Ebon Moss-Bachrach as Gene, Brenda's husband and Jimmy's brother-in-law
- Sasha Lane as Sherri, a theater assistant
- Maisy Stella as Leslie, Jimmy and Dennis' young downstairs neighbor and Vincent's roommate
- Amy Carlson as Phyllis, a theater actress
- Stephen Adly Guirgis as Larry, a theater actor
- Jahi Di'Allo Winston as Ryan, a theater actor
- Blanka Zizka as Anna, a theater director
- Dennis Courtis as Billy, Brenda and Gene's young son
- Mohammad B. Ghaffari as Jimmy and Brenda's father
- Lizbeth MacKay as Jimmy and Brenda's mother
- Wesley Han as Translator

== Production ==
In January 2025, Ira Sachs revealed that he would be writing and directing a new film titled The Man I Love. Sachs stated that the character of George was a conglomeration of several people, naming Ron Vawter, Frank Maya, and Ethyl Eichelberger specifically. He stated that the script took fifteen years for him and Zacharias to complete, and it was inspired by Maurice Pialat's Van Gogh. Sachs also stated that he took inspiration for elements of the story from Paul Monette's Borrowed Time as well as Andrew Holleran's writing, specifically beginning with Dancer from the Dance. Sachs provided the cast with various sources of study to aid in their understanding of the era and setting, including How to Survive a Plague, Maestro, Je Tu Il Elle, and Opening Night.

The film is produced by Big Creek Projects (Scott McGehee and David Siegel, and Mike Spreter), alongside Myriam Schroeter, Misook Doolittle, and Saïd Ben Saïd for SBS Productions. The creative team includes cinematographer Josée Deshaies, editor Affonso Gonçalves, casting director Avy Kaufman, production designer Tommy Love, and costume designer Megan Gray. The film is storyboarded by August Nandé.

Ben Whishaw had originally been expected to play Jimmy, but left due to scheduling conflicts. When principal photography began on September 29, 2025, in New York City, Rami Malek had been cast as Jimmy, with Tom Sturridge, Luther Ford, Rebecca Hall, and Ebon Moss-Bachrach joining the cast. French-Canadian cinematographer Josée Deshaies shot the film on 35 mm. Filming ended on October 29, 2025.

== Release ==
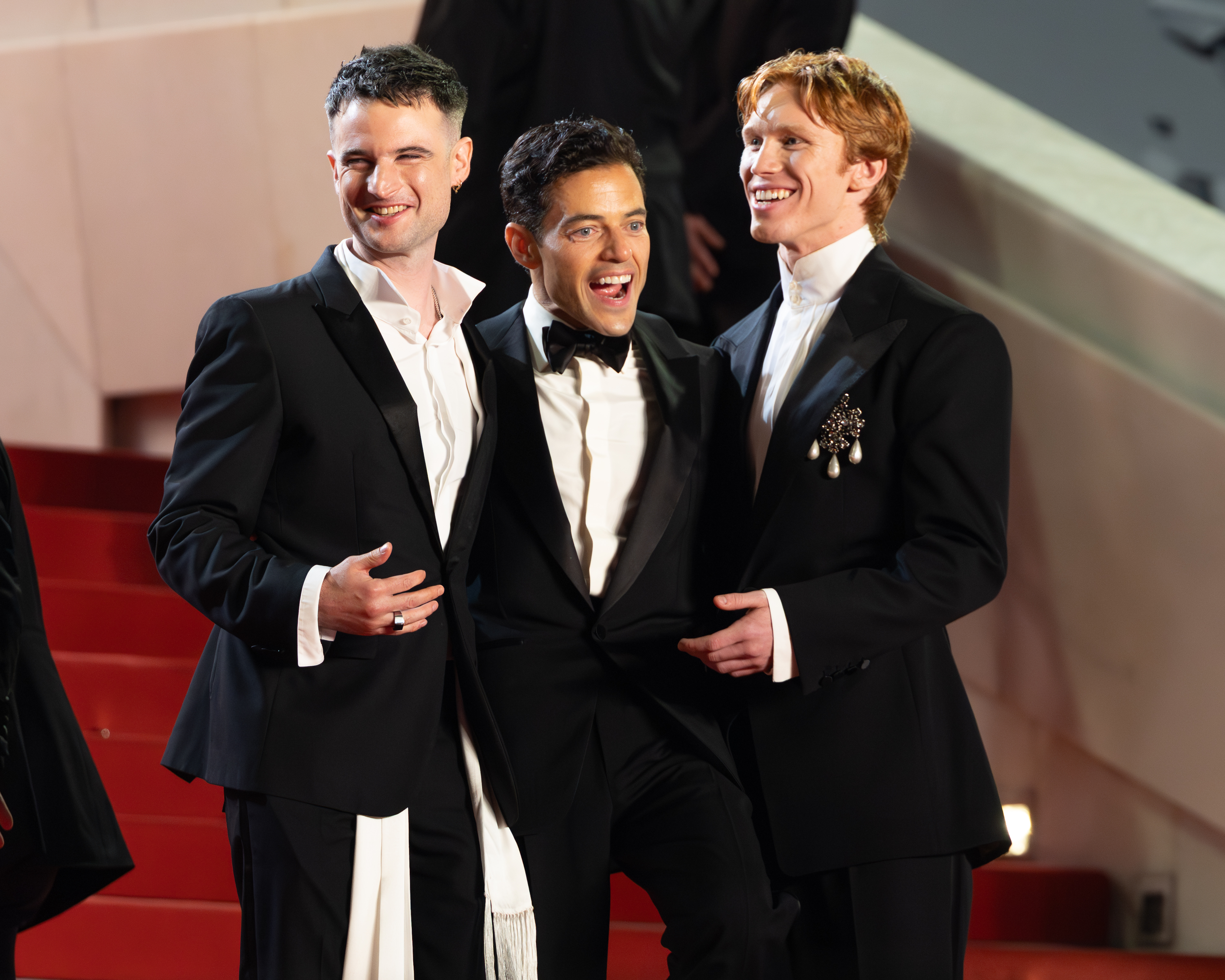
Tom Sturridge, Rami Malek, and Luther Ford at the 2026 Cannes Film Festival

The film had its world premiere at the 79th Cannes Film Festival on May 20, where it competed for the Palme d'Or and the Queer Palm. It was also selected for the 73rd Sydney Film Festival in June 2026, for the Munich International Film Festival, and the 60th Karlovy Vary International Film Festival in July 2026.

The Man I Love had its North American premiere at the 53rd Telluride Film Festival, and also screened at the 2026 Toronto International Film Festival, and in the Main Slate of the 2026 New York Film Festival.

=== Distribution ===
Following its Cannes premiere announcement, MK2 Films boarded the film as its international sales company, with WME Independent handling North American sales. Émilie Georges' and Alexandre Mallet-Guy's Memento Films International is set to release the film in France.

== Reception ==
On the review aggregator website Rotten Tomatoes, 92% of 39 critics' reviews are positive, with an average rating of 7.5/10. Metacritic, which uses a weighted average, assigned the film a score of 77 out of 100, based on 16 critics, indicating "generally favorable" reviews.

=== Critical reviews ===
Collider's Therese Lacson was impressed with the script and cinematography, especially the heightened focus on color and emotion. Lacson noted how the musical performances within the film are used to demonstrate the characters' emotions at several points, but felt that the film seemed to drag through some of these scenes. She was impressed with Malek's performance, and noted how he portrays Jimmy with respect to the two men in his life: aloof with Vincent, vulnerable with Dennis. Lacson praised Sturridge's portrayal of Dennis by calling it his "best performance to date," specifically noting how Sturridges conveys the emotion of the character when Dennis takes care of Jimmy and how he is later treated at the hospital. She did not like Vincent, nor how much the character was on screen, stating that not only did he feel more like a villain, but also that Malek and Ford had no chemistry. She rated the film an 8 out of 10.

David Rooney of The Hollywood Reporter praised Sachs for including sensuality in his depiction of the love between Jimmy and Dennis. Rooney was impressed with both Malek's and Sturridge's performances, specifically noting how Sturridge is able to convey the dynamics of a relationship between an artist and their significant other. He also commented that the emotion that Sturridge conveys with respect to Vincent feeds the "rich vein of melancholy," as does Hall's Brenda. Rooney noted that though the film isn't a musical, it does use music to maintain the pacing. With respect to Billy recording Jimmy, Ronney indicates that it is Billy being impressionable that causes Gene to stop the recording. Rooney noted that there weren't many explosive scenes between characters, which makes the moment that Dennis confronts Vincent "all the more hard-hitting." Rooney stated that the film wasn't like previous AIDS films because it isn't about the death of the character, but about living.

Pete Hammond of Deadline Hollywood also noted that the film is not a musical, but that the "expertly chosen" music is an important aspect of the film. Hammond called Malek's performance "a career high," and praised Ford for bringing humanity into his role and keeping it from being one-dimensional. His only complaint about Hall was that she didn't have enough time on screen, and he was pleased to see Blanka Zizka, Stephen Adly Guirgis, and Sasha Lane as members of the theatre troupe, The Mechanicals. Hammond also praised Tommy Love for the recreation of the era. He praised the film for telling the story of what it is to give everything to art, for being "unapoloetically alive."

IndieWire's Ryan Lattanzio gave The Man I Love a "B+" grade, starting his review by noting how the film is markedly different from other films covering AIDS, leaving out the Kaposi's sarcoma and eschewing hospital scenes other than the one focusing on Dennis rather than Jimmy. He notes that Sachs' history with the area and intimate knowledge of it from that era translated into immersion. Lattanzio notes that Dennis isn't just caring for Jimmy but also using his role as caregiver to keep from having to deal with his own emotional turmoil. Lattanzio indicates a perception of homophobia from Gene when he stops Billy from recording Jimmy's message. Lattanzio praised Sturridge's and Ford's performances. He was also impressed by how Sachs himself is more interested in the story and its portrayal than in "expanding his audience."

Erik Anderson of Awards Watch graded the film an "A-", commenting on its realism in portraying its historical setting, noting specifically the inclusion of "dozens" of real world artists. He also praised Gray's costuming as well as Love's set pieces, and also commented on Deshaies' use of color in depicting the "texture and energy" of the New York City artistic sub-culture of the 1980s. Anderson called this Malek's "best career performance," and praised the diegetic music throughout.

Peter Gray of The AU Review, while praising Sachs for expecting viewers to think, stated that the film doesn't even begin to focus until about halfway through, leaving the audience with an impression of aimlessness rather than intrigue. Gray noted that the film does have a deep emotional current, but ultimately felt that the film took too long to show it. He did note that the transition from "frustratingly opaque" to "profoundly tragic". He rated it 2.5 out of 5 stars.

Ben Kenigsberg of RogerEbert.com stated that one of the films strengths is that it doesn't directly mention AIDS until late in the story. Justin Chang of The New Yorker approved of the use of music, calling it "inventive", but stated that Malek failed to provide "a sense of Jimmy's inner self." Tomris Laffly of Elle, however, felt that Sachs used Malek's talents to great effect. Laffly also stated that the film is stronger for depicting the artistic life rather than serving as a film decrying the cruelty with which AIDS patients were inundated. TheWrap's Chase Hutchinson stated that the film's strengths included details and emotion while not hiding the characters' flaws, and praised Malek's performance.

Peter Bradshaw of The Guardian rated the film a 2 out of 5 stars, calling Malek's performance "overripe." Bradshaw said the performance was at odds with the intent of the film. Owen Gleiberman from Variety, though, praised Malek's performance, especially his rendition of "What Have They Done to My Song Ma" and how it displays both sorrow and defiance, calling it "an angel's lament."

=== Audience reception ===
The film received a standing ovation after its debut at Cannes, with reporting varying on the length as being from "seven-plus" to ten minutes. (Note: Variety reported eight minutes; People printed nine.)

=== Accolades ===
Year	Event	Award	Nominee	Result	Ref.
2026	79th Cannes Film Festival	Palme d'Or	The Man I Love	Nominated	
2026	79th Cannes Film Festival	Queer Palm	The Man I Love	Nominated	
