= Shereen Arazm =

Canadian restaurateur, nightclub owner, and television personality

- Born: Shereen Arazm Koules; 1972 (age 53–54); Toronto, Ontario, Canada
- Occupations: Restaurateur, nightclub owner, television personality
- Known for: Judge on Top Chef Canada
- Spouse: Oren Koules

Shereen Arazm Koules (born 1972) is a Canadian restaurateur, nightclub owner, and television personality who lives in Los Angeles. She was also the "resident" judge on the highly rated television series, Top Chef Canada for four seasons and the brand ambassador for Nespresso Canada in 2013 and 2014.

== Early life and education ==
Arazm was born in Toronto in 1972 to a Scottish mother and Iranian father. Her father left Iran at the age of 14 to study in Europe. The family eventually settled in Toronto. Arazm waited tables in Toronto at the age of 18 at Terroni restaurant. She then moved to New York City where she attended art school for a week and half before dropping out. She tended bar and managed restaurants in New York. In 2000, Arazm lost out on an opportunity to purchase a bar on the Upper West Side of Manhattan. After that incident, she moved to Los Angeles where she quickly found work as a bartender at a club called, Las Palmas.

== Career ==
Arazm's entrepreneurial career began in 2003 when she partnered with her Las Palmas boss, Loyal Pennings, to create Concorde, a nightclub in Los Angeles. The first major event held at the club was a birthday party for Ben Affleck thrown by then girlfriend Jennifer Lopez. In 2004, she partnered with the Dolce Group to open Geisha House, a sushi restaurant also located in Los Angeles. Also in 2004, she bought out Loyal Pennings' shares in Concorde to own it outright. She would later rebrand the club to the more feminine "Shag" in 2005.

Arazm opened several clubs from 2007 to 2008 including Parc and Central. In 2009, she opened another club called Wonderland in Hollywood's Cahuenga Corridor. In 2007, she partnered with Cosimo Mammoliti to bring Terroni (the restaurant she worked at as an 18-year-old in Toronto) to Los Angeles. The two opened a second Terroni location in downtown Los Angeles in 2013 along with additional partner, Max Stefanelli.

In 2010, Food Network Canada announced that Arazm would be a "resident" judge for Top Chef Canada television series. Arazm served as a judge on the program until 2014, when it was cancelled. She did not return to the program when it was revived in 2017. Arazm had previously been featured in an episode of the Canadian Slice Channel program, Women on Top in 2007.

In 2019, Arazm and Ruth Tal collaborated to open a plant-based restaurant for celebrities filming in Canada. In 2023, she opened La Bettola di Terroni in Los Angeles, California.

== Personal life ==
Arazm married film producer and former Tampa Bay Lightning co-owner, Oren Koules, in 2008. The two had met by happenstance three years prior on a flight from Toronto to Los Angeles. The couple has had two daughters, Sam (born 2008) and Neve (born 2011). She also has a stepson, Miles (born 1994), from her husband's previous marriage. Miles is a professional ice hockey player.
