= Kenan Thompson =

American actor and comedian (born 1978)

- Thompson in 2012
- Born: May 10, 1978 (age 48); Columbus, Ohio, U.S.
- Occupations: Actor; comedian
- Years active: 1994–present
- Spouse: Christina Evangeline (m. 2011; div. 2022)
- Children: 2
- Website: www.kenanthompson.net

Kenan Thompson (/kiːnən/ KEE-nən; born May 10, 1978) is an American actor and comedian. He has been a cast member on the NBC sketch comedy series Saturday Night Live since 2003, making him the longest-tenured cast member in the show's history. He was also the first regular cast member born after the show's premiere in 1975. Outside of SNL, Thompson starred on NBC's sitcom Kenan from 2021 to 2022.

Thompson began his acting career in the early 1990s, and was an original cast member of Nickelodeon's sketch comedy series All That from 1994–1999, where he often collaborated with co-star Kel Mitchell. Beginning in 1996, they starred in their own sitcom Kenan & Kel (1996–2001). Thompson also had roles in The Mighty Ducks franchise, Good Burger and its sequel Good Burger 2, and as the title character in the 2004 film Fat Albert. His voice acting work includes Space Chimps (2008), Rock Dog (2016), The Grinch (2018) and Wonder Park (2019).

He has been nominated six times for a Primetime Emmy Award for his work on SNL and Kenan, winning once. He is ranked at No. 88 on VH1's 100 Greatest Teen Stars.

== Early life ==
Thompson was born on May 10, 1978, in Columbus, Ohio. His parents are Fletcher and Elizabeth Ann Thompson. He has two siblings: an older brother and a younger sister. His family moved to Atlanta, Georgia, when he was 9 months old. Thompson's mother enrolled him in acting classes at age five. His first role as Toto in a church production of The Wiz had no lines. He continued acting throughout his youth, appearing in school plays such as The Gingerbread Duck. He auditioned for a theater company, The Youth Ensemble of Atlanta (YEA). As a child, he was a fan of The Price Is Right, which he has called "my first love" and "very joyful viewing" that shaped his acting style.

== Career ==
=== 1994–2002: Breakthrough with Kenan & Kel ===
One of Thompson's earliest roles was as an entertainment reporter for CNN's "Real News for Kids". He went on to star in the original run of All That for its first five seasons, playing such characters as Principal Pimpell, Miss Piddlin, Pierre Escargot, and Superdude. He starred as Kenan Rockmore on Nickelodeon's Kenan & Kel from 1996 to 2000, mostly while still working on All That. He began acting in his first film, D2: The Mighty Ducks, while attending Tri-Cities High School, a visual and performing arts magnet school in East Point, Georgia.

Thompson has starred in several films including Good Burger (1997), based on the All That sketch of the same title, and Fat Albert (2004), in which he played the title character. He has also had supporting roles in D2: The Mighty Ducks (1994), D3: The Mighty Ducks (1996), as well as films such as Heavyweights (1995), Big Fat Liar (2002), Love Don't Cost a Thing (2003), and My Boss's Daughter (2003).

=== 2003–present: Saturday Night Live and acclaim ===
Thompson returned to sketch comedy when he joined the cast of Saturday Night Live in 2003, becoming the show's first cast member born after its 1975 premiere. Thompson said he had sent several audition tapes to SNL, which dismissed him as looking too young; he said "it was a couple years' worth of that". Thompson said that he feared his addition to the cast would be a "disservice" to the show: "It was weird for me for a long time". Thompson was a featured player until 2005 (spanning the 29th and 30th seasons) and was promoted to repertory player at the beginning of season 31 (the 2005–2006 season).

In 2013, he began refusing to portray black women characters on the show and demanded SNL hire black women instead.

Thompson has been a cast member on SNL for 23 years, breaking the record for the longest-tenured cast member in the show's history previously held by former castmate Darrell Hammond, who was on the show for 14 years. Thompson became the most senior cast member in the second half of the 2013–14 season, following the departure of Seth Meyers. Thompson also holds the record for most celebrity impressions performed on the show, performing 139, beating Hammond's previous record of 107. Although early on he planned to stay on the show until something else came along, by 2019 he noted that SNL was his "forever plan".

Thompson has been nominated for five Primetime Emmys for his work on SNL, winning once. He has thrice been nominated for Outstanding Supporting Actor in a Comedy Series, in 2018, 2020 and 2021. For co-writing the song "Last Christmas", in 2017 he was nominated for Outstanding Original Music and Lyrics, an award he then won in 2018 for the lyrics to "Come Back Barack" (along with Chris Redd and Will Stephen).

In 2014, SNL head writer Brian H. Tucker noted that simply putting "KENAN REACTS" would get a script more laughs, further elaborating, "Put him in your sketch somewhere, anywhere, and your sketch will get better. Because Kenan knows how to take ordinary lines and make them funny, and take funny lines and make them special." Similarly, Lorne Michaels in a 2019 article referred to Thompson as "the person I most rely on in the cast". Vulture referred to him as the "heir apparent" to Phil Hartman, both being "the glue" of their respective casts.

Thompson's celebrity impressions on SNL include Al Sharpton, Whoopi Goldberg, Bill Cosby, Charles Barkley, David Ortiz, O. J. Simpson, and Steve Harvey. He has performed in over 1,500 sketches, hitting the mark during the March 5, 2022, episode hosted by Oscar Isaac. In commemoration of his 20th anniversary on the show, Thompson received a star on the Hollywood Walk of Fame on August 11, 2022. It was placed next to Lorne Michaels's star.

==== Recurring characters ====
- Darnell Hayes, the host of Black Jeopardy!
- Diondre Cole, the host of What Up with That? (What's Up with That? in some episodes), who is repeatedly distracted by the show's theme song
- Reese De'What, the host of Cinema Classics
- Willie, Michael Che's overly optimistic neighbor
- Jean K. Jean, a French comedian
- Lorenzo McIntosh, a prisoner in the Scared Straight sketches
- Steve Kane, the gym teacher in the Daniel Frye sketches
- Tre, a character in the Californians sketches
- Virginiaca Hastings, an argumentative shopper
- Elliot Pants, Host of What's Wrong with This Picture?

==== Film and television roles ====
During this time he has also taken supporting roles in Barbershop 2: Back in Business (2004), and Snakes on a Plane (2006). In 2009, Thompson was a regular voice actor in the Fox animated series Sit Down, Shut Up, portraying Sue Sezno who, like her last name, always says no. The series premiered on April 19, 2009, but was canceled after only four episodes due to low ratings and poor reviews. Thompson voiced the LeBron James puppet in Nike's MVP "Most Valuable Puppets" commercials, which were produced to be shown throughout the 2009 NBA playoffs. Thompson also guest-starred as Gus's estranged college singing buddy on the USA Network series Psych in the fourth-season episode "High Top Fade Out". In 2011, he returned to Nickelodeon, guest-starring in "iParty with Victorious", a crossover episode of sitcoms iCarly and Victorious.

Thompson appeared as a host of sorts of TeenNick's retro programming block, The '90s Are All That, appearing in many of the block's early bumpers and hyping material. He would return to the block, eventually called NickRewind but at the time called The Splat, for All That's 22nd anniversary, with segments filmed at the 2015 New York Comic Con.

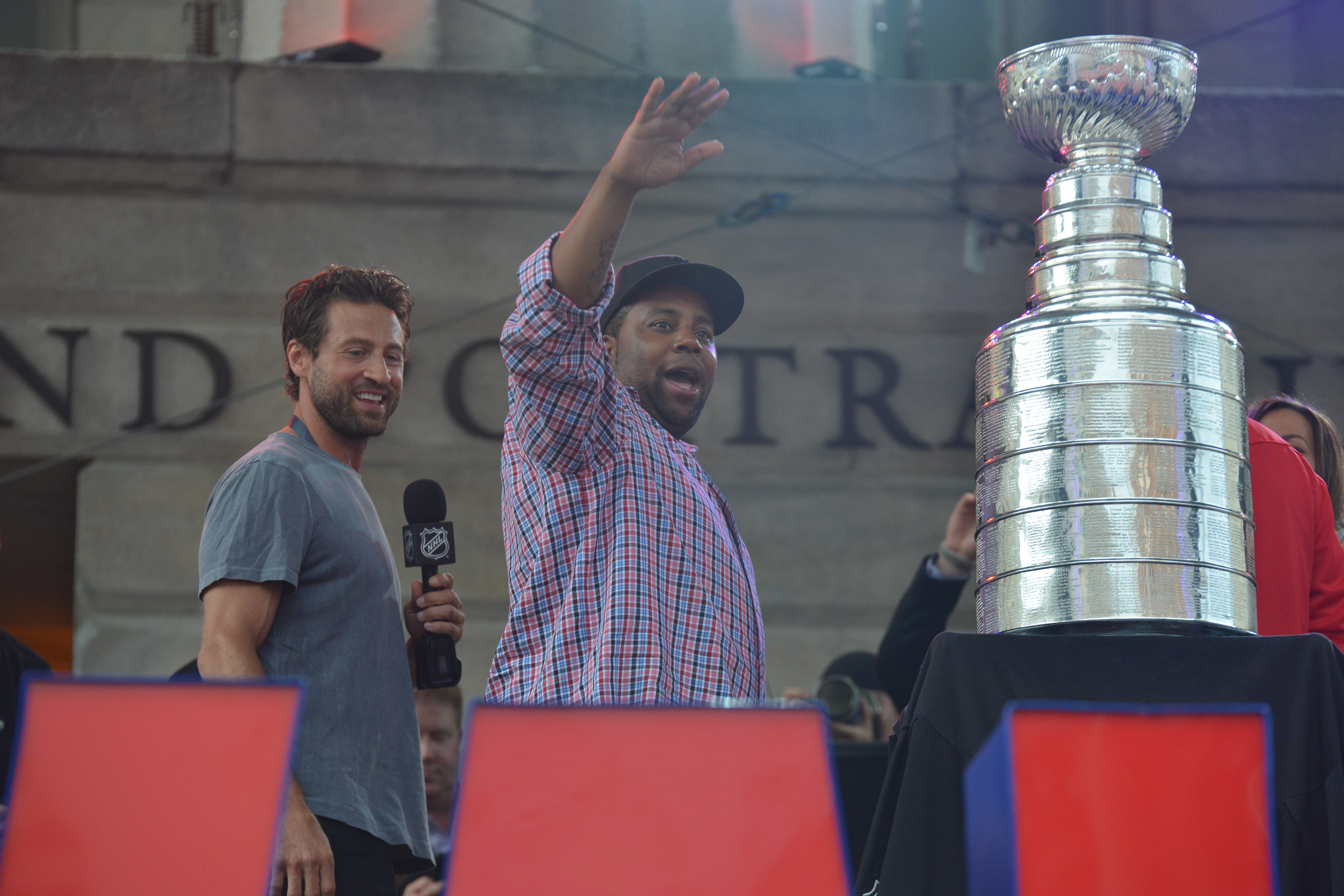
Thompson at a Washington Capitals event with the Stanley Cup in 2018

In 2015, film ticketing website Fandango announced that Thompson would play their brand character, Miles Mouvay. Thompson would play Mouvay in 18 videos, eight 30-second commercials, and several comedic skits.

On September 23, 2015, Thompson appeared on The Tonight Show Starring Jimmy Fallon alongside former All That co-star Kel Mitchell in which they reprised their popular Good Burger roles as "Ed" and "Lester Oakes, Construction Worker". They later competed against one another in an episode of the revived Nickelodeon game show Double Dare that aired in November 2018. In 2019, Thompson served as a judge for NBC's comedy competition series Bring the Funny. He also became an executive producer with Mitchell for Nickelodeon's All That revival, premiering in June. In May 2019, NBC announced they had picked up Thompson's single-camera comedy The Kenan Show to series. The series, retitled Kenan, premiered in 2021 on NBC, featuring Thompson as a newly-widowed father determined to be a "super dad". He was nominated for the Primetime Emmy Award for Outstanding Lead Actor in a Comedy Series after its first season. In May 2022, the series was canceled after its second season.

He appears in the third episode of the revival of The Kids in the Hall as Ron, a Friend of the Kids in the Hall, and hosted the NHL Awards in June 2022. He hosted the 74th Primetime Emmy Awards on September 12, 2022. To promote SNL's 50th Anniversary, Thompson made several announcements on the New York City Subway from February 10, 2025, to February 16, 2025.

== Personal life ==
Thompson says that in early 2000s, his accountant stole $1.5 million from him, his entire savings from his career as a child actor. He attended Santa Monica College, but did not graduate.

Thompson married model Christina Evangeline in 2011; they have two daughters, born in 2014 and 2018. On April 7, 2022, it was announced that the two had been separated for over a year, and are co-parenting their daughters. On June 15, 2022, it was announced that Thompson was officially filing for divorce.

In 2020, he became the spokesman for Universal Destinations & Experiences' "Let Yourself Woah" campaign, and was set to host the 2020 White House Correspondents' Dinner before it was cancelled due to the COVID-19 pandemic. 2021 would also see Thompson be named host of that year's Nickelodeon Kids' Choice Awards and People's Choice Awards. He also hosted The Jonas Brothers Family Roast on Netflix.

In December 2021, Thompson co-founded the production company and talent incubator Artists for Artists (AFA). Their first announced project, Mike Tyson: Undisputed Truth Part 2 is in collaboration with Mike Tyson and wife Lakiha "Kiki" Spicer and a sequel to the boxer's 2013 HBO special. In March 2022, AFA fully funded the launch of Twenty Two Entertainment, led by actors Michael Rainey Jr. and Gianni Paolo, best known from the Starz series Power Book II: Ghost.

In December 2023, Thompson released a memoir titled When I Was Your Age.

In early 2024, Thompson was diagnosed with GERD.

On August 21, 2024, Thompson appeared at the Democratic National Convention tying Project 2025 to the presidential candidacy of Donald Trump, claiming, "You vote for him. You vote for all of this."

== Filmography ==
=== Film ===
Year	Title	Role	Notes
1994	D2: The Mighty Ducks	Russ Tyler	
1995	Heavyweights	Roy Murphy	
1996	D3: The Mighty Ducks	Russ Tyler	
1997	Good Burger	Dexter Reed	
2000	The Adventures of Rocky and Bullwinkle	Lewis	
2002	Big Fat Liar	Party Guest	
2002	The Master of Disguise	Guy on Computer	
2003	Love Don't Cost a Thing	Walter Colley	
2003	My Boss's Daughter	Hans	
2004	Barbershop 2: Back in Business	Kenard	
2004	Fat Albert	Fat Albert	Also voice
2005	Here Comes Peter Cottontail: The Movie	Flutter	Voice
2006	Snakes on a Plane	Troy	
2008	Space Chimps	Ringmaster	Voice
2008	Wieners	Wyatt	
2009	Stan Helsing	Teddy	
2010	Saturday Night	Himself	Documentary
2011	The Smurfs	Greedy Smurf	Voice
2012	The Magic of Belle Isle	Henry	
2013	The Smurfs 2	Greedy Smurf	Voice
2014	They Came Together	Teddy	
2014	The Opposite Sex	Mitch	
2016	Rock Dog	Riff	Voice
2016	Brother Nature	Miesha	
2017	Going in Style	Keith	
2018	The Grinch	Bricklebaum	Voice
2019	Wonder Park	Gus (American version)	Voice
2019	Playmobil: The Movie	Bloodbones	Voice
2019	Dads	Himself	Documentary
2020	Trolls World Tour	Tiny Diamond	Voice
2020	Hubie Halloween	Sergeant Blake	
2021	Clifford the Big Red Dog	Clifford's veterinarian	
2021	Home Sweet Home Alone	Gavin Washington	
2022	Bros	James Baldwin	
2023	Trolls Band Together	Tiny Diamond	Voice
2023	Good Burger 2	Dexter Reed	
2024	Child Star	Himself	Documentary
2026	Scary Movie	Jermaine Jackson	
TBD	Macho		Producer; Documentary

=== Television ===
Year	Title	Role	Notes
1994–99, 2002, 2005, 2019–20	All That	Various roles	Main role (Seasons 1–5); guest role (Season 7); guest role (Seasons 10–11); Executive producer (Season 11)
1996–98	The Steve Harvey Show	Junior	4 episodes
1996–2000	Kenan & Kel	Kenan Rockmore	Main role
1997	Sister, Sister	Trevor	Episode: "Inherit the Twin"
1998	Sabrina, the Teenage Witch	Kenan Rockmore	Episode: "Sabrina's Choice"
1999	Oh Yeah! Cartoons	Host	
1999	The Amanda Show	Himself	Episode: "Episode 1"
1999	Cousin Skeeter	Kenan Rockmore	Episodes: "Hoo, I'm Wild Wild West" (Parts 1 & 2)
2000	The Parkers	Damon	Episode: "Trading Places"
2001	Untitled Sisqo Project		NBC television sitcom pilot
2001	Felicity	DeForrest Ingram	4 episodes
2002	Off Centre	MC French	2 episodes
2003	Clifford the Big Red Dog	Hamburger	Voice; episode: "Food for Thought/Friends Forever"
2003–present	Saturday Night Live	Himself/Various roles	Featured player (Seasons 29–30); Repertory player (Season 31–present)
2005, 2018	Wild 'n Out	Himself	2 episodes
2005	Rugrats	Magic Mirror	Voice; Direct-to-video episode: "Tales from the Crib: Snow White"
2007	Crank Yankers	Mark Thomas	Episode: "4.1"
2008	The Mighty B!	Rocky Rhodes	Voice; 5 episodes
2009	Psych	Joon	Episode: "High Top Fade-Out"
2009	Sit Down, Shut Up	Sue Sezno	Voice: 13 episodes
2011	iCarly	Himself	Episode: "iParty with Victorious"
2011	The '90s Are All That	Host	
2013	Wonder Pets!	Lion	Voice; episode: "In the Land of Oz"
2013	Martha Speaks	Stanley	Voice; episode: "Stanley Saves the Day"
2013–15	The Awesomes	Austin "Impresario" Sullivan	Voice
2015	Randy Cunningham: 9th Grade Ninja	Socko	Voice; episode: "Rorg: A Hero of a Past"
2015	The Tonight Show Starring Jimmy Fallon	Lester Oakes	Episode: "James Spader/Andrew Rannells/Brian Regan"
2015–17	Nature Cat	Ronald	Voice, season 1 only
2016	Maya & Marty	Various roles	Main role
2016, 2019	Unbreakable Kimmy Schmidt	Roland	2 episodes
2017–19	Match Game	Himself/Panelist	4 episodes
2018	Double Dare	Himself	Contestant; episode: "Team Kel vs. Team Kenan"
2018	Studio C	Himself, various roles	
2019	The Masked Singer	Himself	Guest judge; episodes 8, 9
2019	Scooby-Doo and Guess Who?	Himself	Voice; episode: "Quit Clowning!"
2019	Bring the Funny	Himself	Judge
2020, 2026	America's Got Talent	Guest judge	Season 15, two episodes^{1}; Season 21, quarterfinals 3^{2}
2020–22	Trolls: TrollsTopia	Tiny Diamond	Voice
2021–22	Kenan	Kenan Williams	Main role and executive producer
2021	2021 Kids' Choice Awards	Himself	Host
2021	Trolls: Holiday in Harmony	Tiny Diamond	Voice
2021	47th People's Choice Awards	Himself	Host
2021	Jonas Brothers Family Roast	Himself	Host
2021	Bless the Harts	Travis	Voice; 6 episodes
2022	Fraggle Rock: Back to the Rock	Jack Hammer Doozer	Voice; episode: "Wembley the Spokesfraggle"
2022	The Boys Presents: Diabolical	Mo-Slo's Dad	Voice; episode: "An Animated Short Where Pissed-Off Supes Kill Their Parents"
2022	The Kids in the Hall	Ron	Episode 3
2022	That Damn Michael Che	Himself	Episode: "Join the Club"
2022	Archer	The Broker (voice)	Episode: "Saturday"
2022	74th Primetime Emmy Awards	Himself	Host
2022	48th People's Choice Awards	Himself	Host
2023	Bupkis	Referee/Barista	Episode: "ISO"
2023	Praise Petey	Elder Amos (voice)	6 episodes
2023	Chucky	Cab Driver	Episode: "Jennifer's Body"
2027	Stewie	Royal (voice)	Main role

^1 Thompson stood in for Simon Cowell, who was still recovering from a back injury the previous week that required him to rest under medical observation.

^2 Thompson stood in for Cowell again while he was having surgery.

== Discography ==
Kenan Thompson albums
Year	Title	Notes
2004	Good Times	Comedy album

== Bibliography ==
- Thompson, Kenan (December 5, 2023). When I Was Your Age: Life Lessons Funny Stories & Questionable Parenting Advice from a Professional Clown. New York: Harper. ISBN 9780063348066. OCLC 1372337568. Memoir.
- Thompson, Kenan; Tucker, Bryan (January 13, 2026). Unfunny Bunny. Feiwel & Friends. ISBN 9781250364814.

== Awards and nominations ==
Year	Association	Category	Nominated work	Result	Ref.
2017	Primetime Emmy Award	Outstanding Music and Lyrics	Saturday Night Live: "Last Christmas"	Nominated	
2018	Primetime Emmy Award	Outstanding Supporting Actor in a Comedy Series	Saturday Night Live: "John Mulaney"	Nominated	
2018	Primetime Emmy Award	Outstanding Music and Lyrics	Saturday Night Live: "Come Back, Barack"	Won	
2020	Primetime Emmy Award	Outstanding Supporting Actor in a Comedy Series	Saturday Night Live: "At Home #2"	Nominated	
2021	Primetime Emmy Award	Outstanding Lead Actor in a Comedy Series	Kenan: "Flirting"	Nominated	
2021	Primetime Emmy Award	Outstanding Supporting Actor in a Comedy Series	Saturday Night Live: "Dave Chappelle"	Nominated	
2025	Las Culturistas Culture Awards	Titan of Culture		Won	

On August 11, 2022, Thompson was honored with a star on the Hollywood Walk of Fame for his contributions to television. The star is located at 6627 Hollywood Boulevard.
