= Effie Morales =

Fictional character from Power

- Power & Book II character
- First appearance: "Who's Side Are You On?"; 2019
- Last appearance: "Divided We Stand"; 2023
- Created by: Courtney A. Kemp; Curtis "50 Cent" Jackson
- Portrayed by: Alix Lapri
- Date of birth: 2002
- Franchise: Power Universe

In-universe information
- Full name: Effie Morales
- Gender: Female
- Occupation: Student; Drug dealer
- Affiliation: Tariq St. Patrick; Brayden Weston; Cane Tejada (secretly); Diana Tejada; Monet Tejada
- Significant others: Tariq St. Patrick (ex-boyfriend); Yoli (lover)
- Nationality: American

Seasons
- Power 6
- Power Book II: Ghost: 1; 2; 3
- List of Power episodes; List of Ghost episodes

Josefina "Effie" Morales (mononymously known as Effie within the series) portrayed by Alix Lapri, is a fictional character from the Starz crime drama Power, and its spin-off and sequel, Power Book II: Ghost. She is a drug dealer and a former student at Choate where she supposedly had Tariq St. Patrick expelled from.

== Storyline ==
=== Power ===
==== Season 6 ====
Before her debut appearance, she blackmailed Brayden Weston (Gianni Paolo) into letting her meet Brayden's connect and if the connect declines then she threatened to tell on their drug operation to the feds. She went on and had Tariq kicked out of school for selling drugs.

=== Power Book II: Ghost ===
==== Season 1 ====
During the sex week period and parents weekend on Stanfield campus, Effie showed up at Tariq's room while he was with Lauren Baldwin (Paige Hurd), Lauren had to leave as Effie had a business proposal for Tariq to sell drugs amounting to fifty thousand dollars. She later bumped into Brayden and his sister whom she sold drugs to earlier on, the sister wanted more product but Effie refused.

==== Season 2 ====
Apparently Effie came out as bisexual. She’s been seen making out with Yoli. Effie and Diana nearly fought over Tariq and Diana accused Effie of stepping on their product which also led to another heated argument.

=== Season 3 ===
Morales was apprehended for the attempted murder of Lauren Baldwin, Baldwin who was thought to be dead subsequent to Morales, Cane Tejada and Brayden Weston conspiring in her demise after they learned that she was wearing a wire when she was conversing with St. Patrick thus working with feds.

After St. Patrick learned of what Effie did to Baldwin he cut her off the drug organization leading Effie to working with Cane to support herself and pay for her tuition. They eventually found themselves in bed, Cane catching feelings and even acting as an attorney just to see how Effie is doing when she was in custody.

== Appearances ==
Power Universe
Year	Title	Notes	Ref.
2019	Power	Recurring role	
2020–	Power Book II: Ghost	Main role	
