= Amateur (2018 film) =

2018 film by Ryan Koo

- Directed by: Ryan Koo
- Written by: Ryan Koo
- Produced by: Jason Michael Berman; Mark Moran; Chip Hourihan
- Starring: Michael Rainey Jr.
- Cinematography: Gregory J. Wilson
- Edited by: Jeff Wishengrad
- Music by: BC Smith
- Production companies: Mandalay Pictures; Netflix
- Distributed by: Netflix
- Release date: April 6, 2018 (United States)
- Running time: 96 minutes
- Country: United States
- Language: English

Amateur is a 2018 American sports drama film about a young basketball future star struggling with his personal life in pursuit of his dream. The film was released in the United States on April 6, 2018, on Netflix.

== Plot ==
Fourteen-year-old eighth grader Terron Forte is a basketball phenom living in Denver. Despite his incredible court vision and athletic talent, he struggles with dyscalculia—a learning disability that makes it difficult to read and process numbers—which hinders his ability to memorize plays. When a highlight video of Terron goes viral online, it catches the attention of Coach Gaines, the head of an elite, corporate-sponsored amateur basketball program at Liberty Preparatory Academy.

Gaines offers Terron a spot on his high-profile team, promising an accelerated path to a college scholarship and the NBA. Terron's father, Vince—a former football player suffering from worsening, undiagnosed cognitive issues from sports-related brain trauma—eagerly pushes for the move, viewing his son’s talent as the family's financial salvation. Terron’s mother, Nia, is fiercely skeptical of the prep school system and wants her son to focus on his education, but she eventually relents under financial pressure.

Upon arriving at Liberty Prep, Terron is thrust into a hyper-commercialized world where teenage athletes are treated like professional commodities. He faces immediate hostility from his older, jealous teammates—particularly the team's star player, Anton Lyles—and struggles with the complex playbook due to his dyscalculia. Rather than providing academic help, the school simply changes Terron's grades to keep him eligible. Terron eventually bonds with Anton over their shared exploitation, and Terron's exceptional passing ability elevates the entire team, drawing massive crowds and corporate shoe sponsors.

The illusion shatters when Terron discovers that Coach Gaines has been secretly paying Vince under-the-table "allowances" to secure Terron’s loyalty to the program. These illegal payments violate amateur athletic regulations, meaning Terron's future eligibility for NCAA college basketball is entirely compromised if they are caught. Furthermore, Vince uses the illicit money to buy an expensive house the family cannot afford, deepening their legal and financial jeopardy.

When Terron is approached by an agent representing a rival shoe company, Coach Gaines finds out and becomes vindictive. He threatens to expose the illegal payments to the athletic board, which would ruin Terron's career, blacklist his family, and leave them financially ruined. Realizing that the system treats him as an object, Terron decides to use the program's reliance on social media against it.

During a tense confrontation in a stadium backroom, Terron secretly uses his smartphone to livestream a conversation where Coach Gaines openly discusses the illegal cash payments, the falsified grades, and the systematic corruption of the academy. The stream goes viral instantly, exposing Gaines, the school's boosters, and the governing athletic board on a national scale.

In the aftermath, the corporate sponsors pull their funding, and Coach Gaines is fired. Because Terron exposed the corruption himself rather than being caught in a sting, he leverages the massive public support and a newly enacted corporate loophole to protect his teammates from being penalized. Having successfully outmaneuvered the corrupt amateur system, Terron secures a legitimate, independent path forward for his basketball career, finally taking full control of his own future and his family's livelihood.

== Cast ==
- Michael Rainey Jr. as Terron Forte
- Tekola Cornetet as Stevion
- Walter Anaruk as Coach Nguyen
- Sharon Leal as Nia, Terron's mother
- Brian J. White as Vince, Terron's father
- Ketrick Copeland as Byron
- Josh Charles as Coach Gaines
- Corey Parker Robinson as Coach Curtis
- James Siakam as Olembe
- Stefan Frank as Petrus
- Ashlee Brian as Anton Lyles

== Production ==
A crowdfunding project for the film, then known as Manchild, was started in 2011 by director Ryan Koo. In 2013, a short prequel to Manchild was released under the name Amateur. In November 2014, the name of the film was changed to its release title Amateur. In January 2016, it was announced that Netflix had picked up the rights to Amateur to finance and distribute the film.
