= Alix Lapri =

American actress and singer

- Born: Alexus Lapri Geier; November 6, 1996 (age 29); Topeka, Kansas, U.S.
- Occupations: Singer; songwriter; actress
- Known for: Playing Effie Morales on Power & Book II
- Musical career
- Genres: Pop; R&B
- Instrument: Vocals
- Years active: 2008–present
- Label: Crown World Entertainment

Alexus Geier (born November 6, 1996), better known as Alix Lapri, is an American singer, songwriter, and actress. Born in Topeka, Lapri participated in many talent shows in her youth. She portrayed Effie Morales on Power and its sequel and spin-off, Power Book II: Ghost.

Lapri signed with Crown World Entertainment in 2011, and had become friends with Jacob Latimore, as they were signed to the same production company. They released many song covers together, including that of "My Boo", a song by both Usher and Alicia Keys. In 2012, Lapri released her first extended play titled I Am Alix Lapri. The EP was released free of charge for download on multiple media outlets, and was met with positive reviews from various demographics.

She began her acting career in 2024 guest starring on a few episodes of Reed Between the Lines as Nataya. Following this, she has also had roles on shows such as Red Band Society (2014), as Quinby, and in major motion films such as Den of Thieves (2018), as Maloa.

== Life and career ==
=== 2003–2010: Early life and career beginnings ===
Alix Lapri was born November 6, 1996, in Topeka, Kansas to her mother, Lynn Geier. The oldest out of three children, Lapri took an interest in music at an early age.

=== 2011–13: Beginning of an acting career and I Am Alix Lapri ===
In July 2011, Lapri released a remixed cover of Jawan Harris's song "Keisha", which featured Tyga, titled "Forget Keisha". The song was widely popular on BET's 106 & Park, and Lapri both found his voice to be breathtaking and had been a huge fan of him, in which, this caused her to record the remix. Her remix found success across his fan base, and she gained a considerable amount of recognition from it. The following month, she and label mate, Jacob Latimore, recorded a cover of the Alicia Keys and Usher song, "My Boo". In December, Lapri was featured on Jawan Harris' It's On! mixtape. On this mixtape, she recorded a remix cover of Big Sean's "Marvin & Chardonnay" with Issa, which was age-friendly renamed to "Chris Brown and Kool-Aid".

In January 2012, she was featured on Issa's mixtape, King Issa, on a track titled Arriven. In July, Lapri released her first EP titled I Am Alix Lapri. The extended play was released free of charge for download on multiple media outlets, and was met with generally positive reviews. Crown World Entertainment announced the No. 1 Girl Power Tour, which would have featured Lapri, Cymia, HiRiz and Kourtney Heart as performers. The tour was cancelled before any tour dates were released, for unforeseen reasons. In October, she appeared on season one of BET's Reed Between the Lines as Nataya, alongside Tracee Ellis Ross and Malcolm-Jamal Warner.

In November, Alix sang the National Anthem at the WNBA Atlanta Dream playoff game against the Indiana Fever. She was also featured on Jacob Latimore's This Is Me mixtape, on the sixth track listed song, "Clique", which featured Lapri and Justin Martin. Latimore, Lapri, and Martin were the first entertainers to be signed to Crown World Entertainment. In December, she was featured on the cover of Sesi Magazine. Also, she and Rick of Bluff City recorded a cover of "Nobody's Business", a Rihanna and Chris Brown song. The video was sequentially released that following week. In May 2013, Lapri was featured on the cover of G3 Magazine. She also starred in Standing Up, a film about two kids who befriend each other after being left nude in a lake as victims of a summer camp prank. They run away from camp and for three days learn more about each other than they've ever known before. She played the role of Tiwana, and the film was released in August.

=== 2014–present: New music and Den Of Thieves ===
In 2014, Lapri starred guest starred in Red Band Society as Quinby, on the episode titled, "There's No Place Like Homecoming". Quinby was a passive aggressive teenager that had befriended Emma, a patient, at her first school dance. She also played the role of Brittany in Core: A Short Film About Bullying, which was filmed two years prior to its release in 2014. In 2015, Jacob Latimore and Lapri released a cover of Rae Sremmurd's "Throw Summo". She released a cover for "Wish Your Love Away" by Brandy. He and Lapri also attended the 2015 Kids Choice Awards together, where she spoke about her large YouTube fan base, and how she was finding a new sound for herself and her music. She covered Cher Lloyd's "With Ur Love", and sequentially released a music video for it. In 2016, Lapri released a song with Brandon Rossi, titled "5 Mo Minutes". The song is a single from a new body new music that Lapri is working on. She also released a cover for "Too Good", a single by Drake.

In 2017, it was announced that Lapri would be joining alongside Boris Kodjoe and Nicole Ari Parker in Downsized, which is focused on Ebony (Nicole) and Michael (Boris) being forced into a modern "shotgun" wedding after becoming teenage parents, ultimately putting their personal goals to the side to support their family. In the end, the two sweethearts manage to overcome the odds and negative stereotypes, establishing an ideal life for themselves. Lapri starred alongside Gerard Butler and 50 Cent, playing the role of Maloa, in the movie production Den of Thieves. Den of Thieves follows a thief getting trapped between two sets of criminals while planning a bank heist, and was released January 19, 2018.

In August 2025, Lapri was arrested on charges of disorderly conduct and cruelty to children in the 3rd degree (a misdemeanor), was booked into the DeKalb County, Georgia, jail, and released after 24 hours. The cruelty charge includes when a person “intentionally allows a child under age 18 to witness the commission of a forcible felony, battery, or family violence battery.”

== Filmography ==
Film
Year	Title	Role	Notes	Ref
2013	Standing Up	Tiwana	Supporting role	
2014	Core: A Short Film About Bullying	Brittany	Main role	
2017	Downsized	Madison	Main Role	
2018	Den of Thieves	Maloa	Supporting role	

Television
Year	Title	Role	Notes	Ref
2012	Reed Between the Lines	Nataya	3 episodes	
2014	Red Band Society	Quinby	1 episode	
2019	Power	Effie Morales	Recurring role	
2020–2024	Power Book II: Ghost	Effie Morales	Main role	

Music videos
Year	Artist	Song
2011	Jacob Latimore	"Camera Phone"
2012	Jacob Latimore	"Like Em All"
