= Renata Vaca =

Mexican actress and singer

- Renata at City of Dreams premiere in 2024
- Born: Renata Ibinarriaga Vaca; March 26, 1999 (age 27); Mexico City, Mexico
- Citizenship: Mexico; Nicaragua
- Occupations: Actress; singer
- Years active: 2016–present

Renata Ibinarriaga Vaca (born March 26, 1999) is a Mexican and Nicaraguan actress and singer. She is known for her work in films such as Game of Heroes (2016), The Comedian (2021), Saw X (2023), City of Dreams (2024) and Our Times (2025), television series such as Rosario Tijeras (2019), and telenovelas such as La reina soy yo (2019).

== Life and career ==
Renata Ibinarriaga Vaca was born on March 26, 1999, in Tlalpan, Mexico City, the daughter of Nicaraguan mother María Fernanda Vaca Jiménez, and Mexican father Francisco Salvador Ibinarriaga Padilla.

She made her acting debut in the film Lady Rancho (2018), which has been followed by the films Clases de Historia (2018), Bonded (2020) and the series La reina soy yo (2019) and Rosario Tijeras (2019). In 2022, she joined the cast of the tenth installment of the Saw film series, Saw X, which was released in September 2023.

Vaca's most recent project was the film City of Dreams (2024) and the Apple TV+ series Midnight Family (2025), based on the documentary of the same name.

She is also the lead role in the Netflix serie Mal de amores (2026), or Lovesick in english, playing Emilia Sauri, a girl in Puebla dreaming to become a doctor during the Mexican Revolution in 1910.

== Filmography ==
=== Film ===
Year	Title	Role	Notes	Ref.
2023	Saw X	Gabriela		
2024	City of Dreams	Elena		
2025	Trust	Grace	Psychological thriller	
2025	Our Times	Alondra		
2027	K-Pop: The Debut	TBA		

=== Television series ===
Year	Title	Roles	Episode(s)	Notes	Ref.
2022	Pedal to Meral ( Dale Gas)	Abigail	1 episode		
2024	Midnight Family ( Familia de medianoche)	Marigaby Tamayo	10 episodes	Lead role	
2026	Women in Blue (Las Azules)	Olga Correa			
2026	Lovesick (Mal de amores)	Emilia Sauri	7 episodes	Lead role	
