= Ma (2019 film) =

2019 American psychological horror film

- Theatrical release poster
- Directed by: Tate Taylor
- Written by: Scotty Landes
- Produced by: Jason Blum; Tate Taylor; John Norris
- Starring: Octavia Spencer; Juliette Lewis; Diana Silvers; Corey Fogelmanis; Gianni Paolo; McKaley Miller; Luke Evans
- Cinematography: Christina Voros
- Edited by: Jin Lee: Lucy Donaldson
- Music by: Gregory Tripi
- Production companies: Blumhouse Productions; Wyolah Films
- Distributed by: Universal Pictures
- Release date: May 31, 2019
- Running time: 99 minutes
- Country: United States
- Language: English
- Budget: $5 million
- Box office: $61.2 million

Ma is a 2019 American psychological horror film written by Scotty Landes, and directed by Tate Taylor. It stars Octavia Spencer, Juliette Lewis, Diana Silvers, Corey Fogelmanis, Gianni Paolo, McKaley Miller and Luke Evans and follows a group of teenagers who befriend a lonely middle-aged woman. She lets them party in her basement, and they end up being terrorized by her. The film was produced by Jason Blum through his Blumhouse Productions company, along with Taylor and John Norris.

Ma came together as a result of Taylor's desire to direct a film about "something fucked up" and Spencer's desire to break away from the kinds of roles she usually gets to play. Taylor and Spencer are longtime friends, having worked together in films such as The Help and Get on Up. Later, in 2018, Taylor and Blumhouse Productions began developing the film, with Taylor directing, Landes writing, Blum producing and Spencer starring. Principal photography on the film started in February 2018 and wrapped in March 2018, in Mississippi, with some parts shot in Natchez.

Ma was released in the United States on May 31, 2019, by Universal Pictures. It received mixed reviews from critics, who praised the performances (particularly those of Spencer and Lewis), but criticized the pacing and unrealized potential. The film grossed $61.2 million against a $5 million budget. It has since gained a cult following online. A sequel is in development.

== Plot ==
Teenager Maggie Thompson moves with her mother, Erica, to her mother's hometown of Franklin, Ohio, after Erica's husband leaves her. At her new high school, Maggie is befriended by teenagers Haley, Darrell, Chaz, and Andy. They convince veterinary technician Sue Ann Ellington to help them buy alcohol because they are not legally old enough to purchase it themselves. Sue Ann anonymously reports their activities, but they are released because of the officer's history with Andy's father, Ben. The next day Sue Ann invites the teenagers to drink in her basement. Over time, other teenagers arrive at her house to party and start to affectionately call her 'Ma', making her popular among the students.

However, the group grows annoyed as Sue Ann continuously harasses them to spend time with her. One night, she drugs Maggie and takes her earrings. The next morning Maggie finds cuts and bruises on her body and her earrings missing. A scared Maggie tells Andy she no longer wants to go to Sue Ann's house and that she does not want him to go either. To earn the group's trust back, Sue Ann lies that she has pancreatic cancer. Haley notices Sue Ann wearing a bracelet belonging to a friend. The girls suspect that Sue Ann has been stealing their jewelry and break into her house to investigate. They are surprised by Genie, Sue Ann's daughter from a failed marriage; Maggie is surprised to see her walking, as she uses a wheelchair at school. Maggie and Haley escape as Sue Ann comes home.

Ben, who went to high school with Sue Ann, shows up at her job to drop off his cat and invites her out for drinks after work. At the bar, Ben confronts Sue Ann with a tracking device which is installed on all of his company vehicles (one of which Andy frequently borrows when visiting Ma) and asks why his son has been at her house. Ben warns Sue Ann to stay away from Andy. Years before, Sue Ann had a crush on Ben and was deceived into performing fellatio on a boy she thought was Ben. Ben had gotten the school to witness the assault, including his current girlfriend Mercedes and a young Erica.

Sue Ann runs over Mercedes with her truck, killing her. She kills her boss, draws blood from Maggie's dog Louie, and lures Ben to her house, where she knocks him out. Ben wakes up naked and tied to the bed with a towel covering him below the waist. Sue Ann wields a knife around his groin and then lifts up the towel exposing his genitalia and then grabs his penis threatening to cut it off, but then changes her mind and instead transfuses Louie's blood into Ben, slashes his wrist, and leaves him to die. Maggie tells her mother the truth about Sue Ann, and Erica briefly confronts Sue Ann. Sue Ann lures Maggie with a picture of herself with Andy in her basement at Chaz's birthday party. When she arrives, only the original group remains. She tries to get Andy to leave but realizes everyone has been drugged. While trying to get help, Maggie finds Ben's body, and is drugged by Sue Ann.

Maggie awakens chained in the basement. Sue Ann irons Chaz's stomach, sews Haley's mouth shut, and paints Darrell's face white. Andy awakens, and tells Sue Ann he loves her. After kissing, she stabs him for lying. A police officer arrives and is shot by Sue Ann after Maggie screams for help. Sue Ann forces Maggie to gather her friends and take pictures. Sue Ann attempts to hang Maggie but Genie intervenes, starting a fire in the process. Everyone else wakes up and attempts to get out as the fire spreads. Erica, knowing where Maggie likely is, goes with her co-worker to save the teens. Sue Ann attempts to throw Genie into the fire and blames Erica for not stopping the sexual assault. Erica articulates her regrets and Maggie stabs Sue Ann, saving Genie. The group runs outside as Sue Ann walks upstairs and lies down with Ben's corpse as the house burns.

== Cast ==
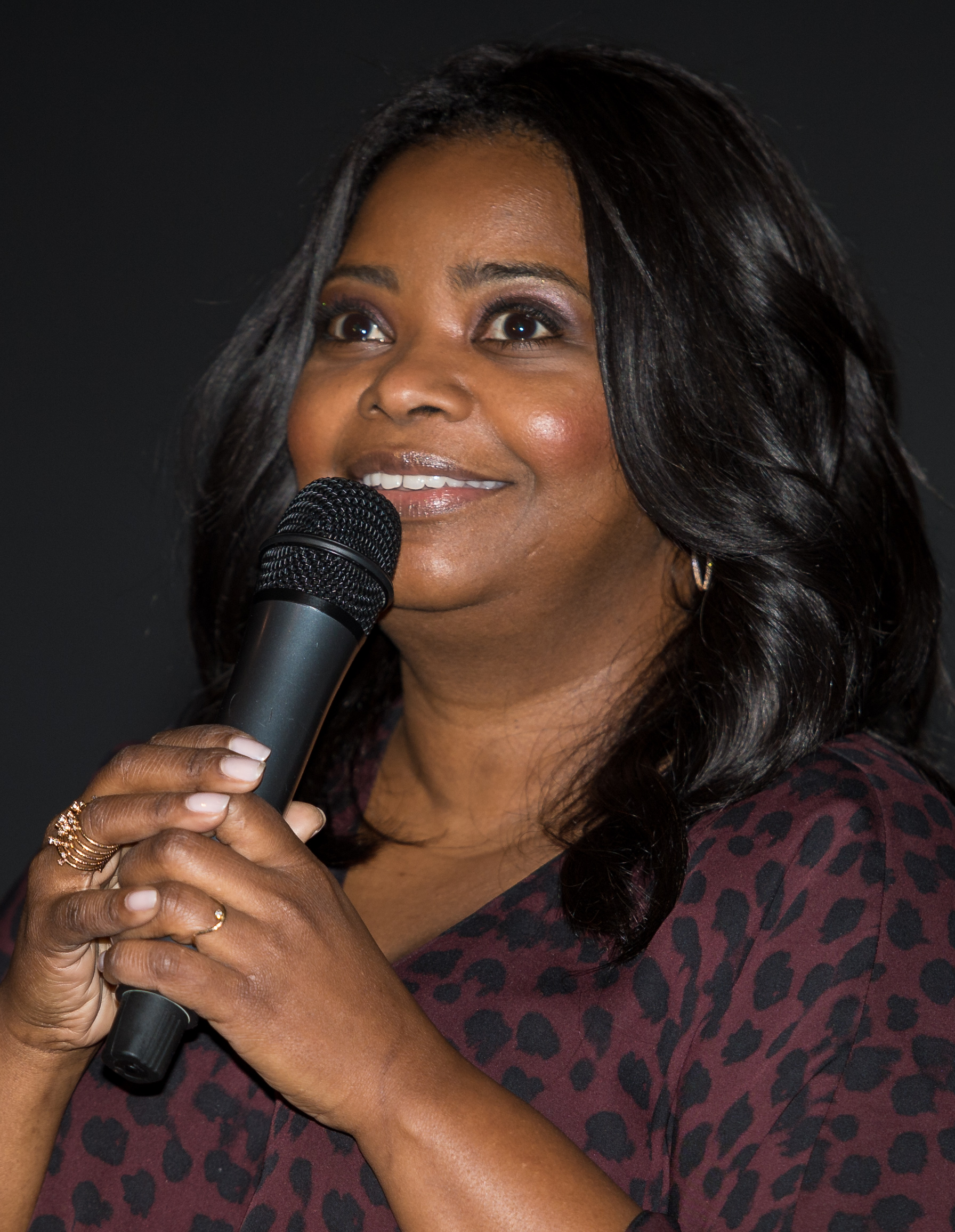
Lead actress Octavia Spencer

- Octavia Spencer as Sue Ann "Ma" Ellington, Genie's mother and Erica, Ben and Mercedes's former high school friend
  - Kyanna Simone Simpson as young Sue Ann
- Diana Silvers as Maggie Thompson
- Juliette Lewis as Erica Thompson
  - Skyler Joy as young Erica
- Corey Fogelmanis as Andy Hawkins, Maggie's boyfriend
- Gianni Paolo as Chaz, Maggie's friend
- McKaley Miller as Haley, Maggie's friend
- Luke Evans as Ben Hawkins
  - Andrew Matthew Welch as young Ben
- Missi Pyle as Mercedes, Ben's girlfriend
  - Nicole Carpenter as young Mercedes
- Dante Brown as Darrell, Maggie's friend
- Tanyell Waivers as Genie Ellington
- Allison Janney as Dr. Brooks, Sue Ann's boss
- Dominic Burgess as Stu, Erica's co-worker
- Tate Taylor as Officer Grainger

== Production ==
=== Development ===
Ma came together as a result of Tate Taylor's desire to direct a film about "something fucked up", and a conversation he had with Octavia Spencer in which she told him that she was "sick of only being offered the same role and never getting to be a lead." The two are longtime friends, having worked together in films such as The Help and Get On Up. Jason Blum and Taylor, who have been friends for a few years, knew each other socially.

Taylor went to Blum's office, reiterating, "I want to do something really fucked up." He read Scotty Landes' script of the film, which Blumhouse Productions had bought the day before. Taylor immediately thought about Spencer. He went out to the hall, called Spencer, and asked her if she would like to be in a horror film; without reading the script, Spencer boarded the project.

There was no backstory for the title character in the original script, which made her "a complete monster that no audience member could sympathize with". The filmmakers made it a priority to come up with an authentic backstory for the role. Taylor thought it was important to weave the themes of trauma, the sins of our parents, and how we treat people into the story to create a character audiences can relate to and feel bad for.

=== Filming ===
Principal photography on the film started in February 2018. Filming took place in Mississippi, with parts shot in Alcorn State University's MBA building and in town of Natchez, and wrapped in March 2018.

== Release ==
Ma was released on May 31, 2019. The first trailer was released on February 13, 2019.

=== Home media ===
Ma was released digitally on August 20, 2019, and on DVD and Blu-ray on September 3, 2019, by Universal Pictures Home Entertainment (UPHE). The film grossed $3.1 million in domestic video sales.

== Reception ==
=== Box office ===
Ma grossed $45.9 million in the United States and Canada, and $15.3 million in other countries/territories, for a worldwide total of $61.2 million, against a production budget of $5 million.

In the United States and Canada, Ma was released alongside Godzilla: King of the Monsters and Rocketman, and was projected to gross around $20 million in its opening weekend. The film made $7.2 million on its first day, including $1.4 million from Thursday night previews. It went on to debut to $18.4 million, finishing fourth at the box office. The film made $7.8 million in its second weekend (dropping 54% and finishing in seventh), and then made $3.7 million in its third weekend.

=== Critical response ===
On Rotten Tomatoes, the film has an approval rating of 55% based on 215 reviews, with an average rating of 5.6/10. The site's critical consensus reads, "Octavia Spencer's performance overpowers many of Ma's flaws, but uneven pacing and a labored story keep this thriller from fully realizing its unhinged potential." On Metacritic the film has a weighted average score of 53 out of 100, based on 39 critics, indicating "mixed or average reviews". Audiences polled by CinemaScore gave the film an average grade of "B−" on an A+ to F scale, while those at PostTrak gave it an average two and a half out of five stars.

Benjamin Lee of The Guardian gave the film three out of five stars, describing it as "a nasty yet surprisingly empathetic slab of exploitation with more than just carnage on its mind." Leah Greenblatt of Entertainment Weekly rated the film a grade of B, specifying, "Even as the story descends into full bloody camp at its crescendo, Spencer holds the more ludicrous plot threads together." Owen Gleiberman of Variety wrote, "Spencer, a chameleon of an actress, does mood swings in Ma that leave us entertainingly off guard."

Jude Dry of IndieWire gave the film a grade of C, stating that "it takes an amusing premise, reduces it to its most basic parts, then weighs it down with silly scare tactics," while John DeFore of The Hollywood Reporter wrote, "It quickly spins its shaky premise off into an unconvincing study of emotional need and an even harder-to-believe revenge thriller."

In an article published by Gawker in October 2021, writers Olivia Craighead and Sarah Hagi discussed Ma's legacy and their enduring fixation with the film. Craighead and Hagi wrote that "as Black women, it's hard not to empathize and see [themselves] in Ma". The review discusses the film's flaws, such as its avoidance of dealing with race directly. Craighead and Hagi also include quotes from critic Doreen St. Félix and comedian Ayo Edebiri in the piece; both share the writers' interest in the movie, and both have rewatched it numerous times.

=== Accolades ===
At 2019's Saturn Awards, Spencer was nominated for Best Actress and the film was nominated for Best Thriller Film.

== Sequel ==
In July 2023, Melissa McCarthy expressed interest in working with Octavia Spencer on a potential sequel. In June 2025, it was confirmed that a sequel with Spencer returning is in development. One week later, Ashley Nicole Black was announced as writer.
