= Davis MacLean =

Fictional lawyer in Power Book II

- Power Book II: Ghost character
- First appearance: "The Stranger"; 2020
- Created by: Courtney A. Kemp
- Portrayed by: Method Man
- Date of birth: 1971
- Status: Alive
- Franchise: Power Universe

In-universe information
- Gender: Male
- Occupation: Defense attorney
- Affiliation: The Tejadas; The St. Patricks
- Family: Theo Rollins (brother)
- Spouse: Marilyn MacLean
- Significant others: Carrie Milgram; Paula Matarazzo (ex-affair)
- Nationality: American
- Attorney partner: Cooper Saxe

Davis MacLean, portrayed by Method Man, is a fictional character from the Starz television series Power Book II: Ghost, a sequel and spin-off to Power, he is one of the main characters within the series and a criminal defense attorney mainly for Tariq St. Patrick (Michael Rainey Jr.) in season 1 and season 2 prior where he forged an alliance with Cooper Saxe (Shane Johnson).

After managing to keep Tasha St. Patrick (Naturi Naughton) and Tariq out of jail after Tariq was indicted for the murder of his father, James "Ghost" St. Patrick (Omari Hardwick), and also keeping Tasha out of Tommy Egan's (Joseph Sikora) harms way, he went on to partner with Cooper Saxe (if not recruiting him to his firm) whom he was opposed by.

== Short description ==
Davis MacLean is in possession of a calm, calculating and resolute personality. He is highly prominent for being the most expensive 'non-losing' defense attorney. Apparently MacLean has a brother (Theo Rollins, portrayed by Redman) whose diagnosed with terminal illness in prison, however MacLean seems to be doing everything in his power to get his brother out of prison before he meets his demise.
