= Trust (2025 film) =

- Theatrical release poster
- Directed by: Carlson Young
- Written by: Gigi Levangie
- Produced by: Miles Koules; Ketura Kestin; Oren Koules
- Starring: Sophie Turner; Rhys Coiro; Billy Campbell; Peter Mensah; Forrest Goodluck; Gianni Paolo; Renata Vaca; Katey Sagal
- Cinematography: Alejandro Martínez
- Edited by: Louis Cioffi
- Music by: Isom Innis
- Production companies: Twisted Pictures; Republic Pictures
- Distributed by: Republic Pictures
- Release date: August 22, 2025
- Running time: 90 minutes
- Country: United States
- Language: English
- Box office: $368,356

Trust is a 2025 American thriller film directed by Carlson Young. Sophie Turner stars as a Hollywood actress who hides in a remote cabin after a scandal, only to find herself betrayed and fighting for survival against someone she once trusted. The film was released in theaters on August 22, 2025.

== Cast ==
- Sophie Turner as Lauren Lane
- Rhys Coiro as Darren
- Billy Campbell as Peter
- Peter Mensah as Kroft
- Forrest Goodluck as Merg
- Gianni Paolo as Marcus
- Renata Vaca as Grace
- Katey Sagal as Loretta

== Production ==
In February 2024, Carlson Young was signed to direct the film, and Sophie Turner was cast in the film. In March 2024, Katey Sagal, Billy Campbell, Rhys Coiro, Peter Mensah, Forrest Goodluck, and Gianni Paolo were also set to star in the film, with principal photography beginning in Mexico City that month.

On June 3, 2025, it was reported that Isom Innis, a frequent collaborator of Carlson Young, composed the score for the film.

== Release ==
The film was released on August 22, 2025.

== Reception ==
On the review aggregator website Rotten Tomatoes, 25% of 16 critics' reviews are positive.
