= LaToya Tonodeo =

American actress (born 1997)

- Born: April 23, 1997 (age 28); Los Angeles, California
- Occupation: Actress
- Years active: 2009–present

LaToya Tonodeo is an American actress. She is best known for playing Diana Tejada in the crime drama series Power Book II: Ghost and Tara Byrd in the crime drama series The Oath.

== Early life ==
Tonodeo was born in Los Angeles, California on April 23, 1997.

== Career ==
She made her on screen debut at the age of 12 in the tv movie Becoming Pony Boi where she played a party girl. Her first appearance in a television series was playing Ashley in 2 episodes of the drama series The Fosters. Her first big role came playing Tara Byrd in the crime series The Oath. She gained popularity for her best known role yet as Diana Tejada in the crime drama series Power Book II: Ghost

== Personal life ==
She is married to fellow actor Arlen Escarpeta. She names her mother, her deceased grandmother, her best friend and Mary J. Blige as her main influences.

== Filmography ==
=== Film ===
Year	Title	Role	Notes
2009	Becoming Pony Boi	Party Girl	
2015	Paul Blart: Mall Cop 2	Lady in Casino	
2015	The Last Straw	Sonia	Short
2015	Dutch Hollow	Jasmine Pierce	
2016	The Perfect Match	Bridesmaid 1	
2018	The Head Thieves	Jordan	
2022	The Crew Has It	Herself	
2025	The Newlyweds: Blood at the Altar	Tia Witherspoon	Short

=== Television ===
Year	Title	Role	Notes
2018	The Fosters	Ashley	2 episodes
2018-2019	The Oath	Tara Byrd	5 episodes
2020-2024	Power Book II: Ghost	Diana Tejada	40 episodes
