= City of Dreams (film) =

2023 American-Mexican film

- Theatrical release poster
- Directed by: Mohit Ramchandani
- Written by: Mohit Ramchandani
- Produced by: Vivek Ramaswamy; Tony Robbins; Mohit Ramchandani; Matthew Diezel; Jon Graham; Rufus Parker; Luis Mandoki; Kyle Stroud
- Starring: Ari Lopez; Renata Vaca; Alfredo Castro; Paulina Gaitán; Jason Patric; Diego Calva
- Cinematography: Alejandro Chávez
- Edited by: Matthew Diezel
- Music by: Lisa Gerrard
- Production companies: Mogul Productions; Original Entertainment; P2 Films
- Distributed by: Roadside Attractions
- Release dates: March 5, 2023 (Mammoth Film Festival); August 30, 2024 (United States)
- Running time: 114 minutes
- Countries: United States; Mexico
- Languages: English; Spanish
- Box office: $1.7 million

City of Dreams is a 2023 American-Mexican drama thriller film written and directed by Mohit Ramchandani, and stars Ari Lopez, Renata Vaca, Alfredo Castro, Paulina Gaitán, Jason Patric, and Diego Calva.

Inspired by a true story, City of Dreams chronicles the journey of a Mexican boy whose dreams of becoming a soccer star are shattered when he's smuggled across the border and sold to a sweatshop in downtown Los Angeles.

City of Dreams was released in the United States by Roadside Attractions on August 30, 2024. The film received mixed reviews from critics and has grossed $1.7 million worldwide.

== Cast ==
- Ari Lopez as Jesús
- Alfredo Castro as El Jefe
- Paulina Gaitán as Maria
- Diego Calva as Carlitos
- Renata Vaca as Elena
- Jason Patric as Stevens
- Samm Levine as Nazarian

== Production ==
In February 2023, it was reported that Yalitza Aparicio was going to serve as an executive producer on the American-Mexican drama thriller film titled Dreamers, and that Jason Patric had joined the cast.

In October 2023, it was announced that Roadside Attractions had acquired the distribution rights to now-retitled City of Dreams, written and directed by Mohit Ramchandani in his directorial debut.

== Release ==
City of Dreams had its world premiere at the Mammoth Film Festival on March 5, 2023. It was originally scheduled to release in the United States on April 5, 2024, but was pushed back to August 30, 2024.

== Reception ==
=== Box office ===
In the United States and Canada, City of Dreams was released alongside Afraid, Slingshot, 1992, and Reagan. It debuted to $1.4 million over the four-day Labor Day weekend.

=== Critical response ===
On the review aggregator website Rotten Tomatoes, 53% of 19 critics' reviews are positive, with an average rating of 5.7/10. Metacritic, which uses a weighted average, assigned the film a score of 14 out of 100, based on 5 critics, indicating "overwhelming dislike".

== See also ==
- List of association football films
