= Frank Maya (comedian) =

American musician and comedian (1950–1995)

Frank Maya (1950–1995) was a poet, musician, performance artist and stand-up comedian.

== Early life and education ==
Maya was born in Queens, one of six children, and raised in Long Island. His father, Frank, was Columbian and his mother, Janet, was Irish. Maya graduated from Hofstra University in 1972.

== Career ==
Maya began his career on the downtown New York performance art scene in the mid-1970s. In 1983, The Frank Maya Band performed occasionally at Danceteria as well as Folk City, CBGB's and The Kitchen. The New York Times said "While Mr. Maya's cheerful, punk jug-band music is very much of the moment, his humor belongs to an older tradition of anticonformist humor. His vision of America in the 80's has much in common with that of 'sick comedians' of the 50's." It also referred to Maya's music as "a different sort of folk entirely. He brings songs, poetry, prerecorded tapes, lyrics, humor and instruments that may even include such things as vacuum cleaners and garbage-can covers." With his band Frank Maya & The Decals, they released "Have You Been Getting My Letters."

In March of 1984, he performed at The Bottom Line, opening for The Waitresses.

Maya performed several one-person shows like 1987's Frank Maya Talks at LeMama, Get Out of the House and Unauthorized Autobiography: An Outing for the Whole Family.

In 1989, Maya pivoted to stand-up comedy. He told Entertainment Weekly that at the time, ”There was so much gay bashing. Sam Kinison and Andrew Dice Clay were very popular, but there were no other voices out there.” His material, he told NPR, was "about the human condition." In 1991, he did a stand-up set on MTV's Half Hour Comedy Hour. David Spade introduced Maya as "America's only openly gay comedian."

In 1993, he performed his stand-up show at The Atlantic Theater called Paying For The Pool.

== Tribute ==
In 2026, Morgan Bassichis did a one person show, Can I Be Frank? a tribute to Frank Maya, performing monologues from Maya's 1987 show, Frank Maya Talks.

== Personal ==
Frank Maya died at age 45, from heart failure that was related to AIDS on August 7, 1995. He was survived by his partner, Blake West, his parents, and his siblings.
