= Michael Rainey Jr. =

American actor

- Born: Michael Andile Rainey Jr. September 22, 2000 (age 25); Louisville, KY, U.S.
- Other name: Ma-Ah
- Occupation: Actor
- Years active: 2010–present
- Known for: Portraying Tariq St. Patrick in Power & Book II: Ghost

Michael Rainey Jr. (born September 22, 2000) is an American actor best known for the role of Tariq St. Patrick on Power, Power Book II: Ghost and Power: Legacy, He also made his special guest appearance in Power Book IV: Force series finale (3x10). He also starred as Michael Burset in Orange Is the New Black and Jalen in Barbershop: The Next Cut.

== Early life and education ==
Rainey Jr. was born in Louisville, Kentucky, the son of Michael Rainey Sr. and Shauna Small. Through his mother, he is of Jamaican descent. His father lives in New York City, with Rainey Jr. being raised in Staten Island, New York from the age of one. His mother homeschooled him in his youth. Rainey Jr. supports ‘Find and Feed’, an Indiana based organization that cares for the homeless.

== Career ==
Rainey Jr. began his career at the age of nine when featured in Un Altro Mundo, and followed it with appearances in a variety of movies and shows such as Orange Is the New Black, Barbershop: The Next Cut, Amateur, 211 and Power.

Rainey Jr. reprised his role as Tariq St. Patrick in Power Book II: Ghost, where he played the show's leading character.

In March 2022, Rainey Jr., along with Power co-star Gianni Paolo, launched Twenty Two Entertainment. The first project is the self-hosted podcast, The Crew Has It. Twenty Two Entertainment is fully funded by Artists For Artists, launched in December 2021 by Kenan Thompson and John Ryan Jr.

== Personal life ==
In 2022, he was in a relationship with Haile Rose.

== Filmography ==
=== Film ===
Year	Title	Role	Notes	Ref.
2010	Un Altro Mondo	Charlie		
2012	LUV	Woody		
2013	The Butler	Cecil Gaines		
2014	Second Chance Christmas	Lawrence		
2016	Barbershop: The Next Cut	Jalen		
2018	Amateur	Terron Forte		
2018	211	Kenny Rastell		

=== Television ===
Year	Title	Role	Notes	Ref.
2013–2015	Orange Is the New Black	Michael Burset	7 episodes; recurring role	
2014–2020	Power	Tariq St. Patrick	Recurring role (seasons 1–2); main role (seasons 3–6)	
2020–2024	Power Book II: Ghost	Tariq St. Patrick	Lead role	
2026	Power Book IV: Force	Tariq St. Patrick	Special guest star (season 3 episode 10)	
TBA	Power: Legacy	Tariq St. Patrick	Lead role	
