= Wesley Han =

American entertainer (born 1995/1996)

- Born: 1995/1996 (age 30–31)
- Education: Swarthmore College
- Occupations: Actor, model, writer
- Website: wesleyhan.com

Wesley Han (Korean: 한제혁; born 1995/1996) is an American actor, model, and writer based in New York City. Han is non-binary and known for portraying both male and female characters.

== Early life and education ==
Han majored in theater at Swarthmore College where they were awarded the Kaori Kitao Humanities Fellowship for playwriting. They graduated in 2018.

== Career ==
Han's acting credits include the TV series Power Book II: Ghost, Russian Doll, and Awkwafina Is Nora from Queens and the 2023 film Daughter of the Bride.

In 2024, Han was one of 25 selected by the Asian American Arts Alliance for a grant program for Asian American Pacific Islander (AAPI) artists in New York City.

== Personal life ==
Han is non-binary and goes by they/them pronouns.

In March 2026, a security guard allegedly forcibly removed Han from a women's restroom at the Soho Grand Hotel in Manhattan while Han was wearing feminine clothing. The following month, Han sued the hotel for discrimination, alleging violations of the New York Human Rights Law and New York City Human Rights Law.
