= Miles Koules =

American ice hockey player

- Born: June 25, 1994 (age 32) Los Angeles, California, U.S.
- Height: 6 ft 0 in (183 cm)
- Weight: 192 lb (87 kg; 13 st 10 lb)
- Position: Right wing
- Shot: Right
- Played for: Ontario Reign; Cleveland Monsters; HIFK; Bakersfield Condors; Binghamton Devils
- NHL draft: Undrafted
- Playing career: 2015–2021

Miles Koules (born June 25, 1994) is an American former professional ice hockey winger and film producer. He has played for the Binghamton Devils of the American Hockey League (AHL) and for HIFK in the Finnish top tier league Liiga. Internationally, he has represented the United States at the World U-17 Hockey Challenge.

Koules is the founder of Koulest Productions, a film production company where he partnered with his father Oren Koules.

== Playing career ==
=== Amateur ===
Koules was born in Los Angeles, California to parents Risa Shapiro and Oren Koules. Growing up in California, he stated that he felt there were limited opportunities to develop as an ice hockey player. After his father became a part owner of the Tampa Bay Lightning, Koules enrolled at Shattuck-Saint Mary's in Minnesota to further his development. After completing three seasons at Shattuck-Saint Mary's, Koules joined the USA Hockey National Team Development Program (USNTDP). At the age of 16, Koules verbally committed to play collegiate hockey for the University of North Dakota.

On January 10, 2012, Koules' Western Hockey League (WHL) rights were traded to the Medicine Hat Tigers in exchange for Reid Petryk. On April 30, 2012, Koules committed to leave the USNTDP and join the Tigers for the 2012–13 season, thus foregoing his collegiate eligibility. The Tigers general manager Brad McEwen credited this change to Koules' personal connections to members on the team, such as Emerson Etem and Hunter Shinkaruk.

He stayed with the Medicine Hat Tigers for nearly three seasons, recording career highs in his second season with the team and accepting invitations to NHL Development camps. On September 29, 2014, Koules was traded to the Portland Winterhawks in exchange for a 2017 4th round draft pick.

=== Professional ===
After his major junior hockey career concluded following the 2014–15 season, Koules joined the Quad City Mallards of the ECHL. He was later traded to the Wichita Thunder in exchange for future considerations after playing in 44 games for the Mallards.

On October 15, 2016, Koules was traded to the Atlanta Gladiators. His playing rights were later traded to the Tulsa Oilers. He was again traded on January 24, 2017, to the Elmira Jackals but it was short-lived as his playing rights were moved to the Indy Fuel days later.

On February 2, 2017, Koules was signed to a professional tryout agreement with the Ontario Reign of the American Hockey League (AHL). After playing in two games for the Reign, he was returned to the ECHL before signing a 25-game professional tryout with the Cleveland Monsters of the AHL in March 2017. His contract evolved into an AHL contract for the 2017–18 season on July 26, 2017. After attending the Columbus Blue Jackets NHL training camp on a tryout contract, Koules was reassigned to the AHL for the 2017–18 season.

After spending the entire 2017–18 season in the AHL, Koules joined the HIFK in the Finnish top tier league Liiga during the 2018-19 season. He returned to North America after agreeing to an AHL contract with the Monsters on January 11, 2019 after playing in 13 games. He scored his first two goals of the season in a 6–3 loss to the Syracuse Crunch on February 2.

After a one-year stint with the Bakersfield Condors in the COVID-19 affected 2019–20 season, Koules extended his career in the AHL, joining the Binghamton Devils on a professional tryout contract prior to the pandemic delayed 2020–21 season on February 1, 2021.

== International play ==
While playing at St. Mary's, Koules was named to the U.S. Under-17 Select Team to compete in the 2010 Five Nations tournament. Koules scored his first goal of the tournament on August 18, 2010, in a 5–3 win over Team Czech Republic.

He helped lead Team USA to the 2010 Under-17 Four Nations Cup with seven points in four games.

He won a silver medal with Team USA at the 2011 World U-17 Hockey Challenge.

He is slated to play for Greece in the upcoming Amerigol LATAM Cup.

== Business career ==
Koules partnered with his father Oren Koules in 2022 to form the film production company Koulest Productions.

=== Filmography ===
Year	Title	Role	Notes
2025	Trust	Producer	

== Personal life ==
Koules is the son of talent agent Risa Shapiro and entrepreneur Oren Koules. Koules and Shapiro separated in 2005 and eventually divorced in 2007. Oren remarried in 2008 and as a result, Miles has two younger half sisters.

== Career statistics ==
			Regular season					Playoffs
Season	Team	League	GP	G	A	Pts	PIM	GP	G	A	Pts	PIM
2009–10	Shattuck St. Mary's U16	Midget	53	20	38	58	26	—	—	—	—	—
2010–11	USNTDP Juniors	USHL	26	3	4	7	18	2	0	0	0	0
2010–11	USNTDP U17	USDP	42	14	12	26	24	—	—	—	—	—
2011–12	USNTDP Juniors	USHL	28	6	9	15	32	2	1	0	1	4
2011–12	USNTDP U17	USDP	15	4	5	9	26	—	—	—	—	—
2011–12	USNTDP U18	USDP	42	4	12	16	43	—	—	—	—	—
2012–13	Medicine Hat Tigers	WHL	69	19	21	40	18	8	1	3	4	0
2013–14	Medicine Hat Tigers	WHL	70	25	26	51	34	18	4	6	10	10
2014–15	Medicine Hat Tigers	WHL	2	1	0	1	0	—	—	—	—	—
2014–15	Portland Winterhawks	WHL	67	26	32	58	47	17	2	11	13	2
2015–16	Quad City Mallards	ECHL	44	3	10	13	8	—	—	—	—	—
2015–16	Wichita Thunder	ECHL	15	4	9	13	2	—	—	—	—	—
2016–17	Atlanta Gladiators	ECHL	11	1	3	4	0	—	—	—	—	—
2016–17	Tulsa Oilers	ECHL	25	3	13	16	14	—	—	—	—	—
2016–17	Ontario Reign	AHL	2	0	0	0	0	—	—	—	—	—
2016–17	Cleveland Monsters	AHL	7	1	0	1	6	—	—	—	—	–
2017–18	Cleveland Monsters	AHL	68	13	14	27	10	—	—	—	—	—
2018–19	HIFK	Liiga	13	2	0	2	2	—	—	—	—	—
2018–19	Cleveland Monsters	AHL	19	4	0	4	6	—	—	—	—	—
2019–20	Bakersfield Condors	AHL	31	1	4	5	11	—	—	—	—	—
2020–21	Binghamton Devils	AHL	12	0	2	2	2	—	—	—	—	—
AHL totals			139	19	20	39	37	—	—	—	—	—
Liiga totals			13	2	0	2	2	—	—	—	—	—
