= Gianni Paolo =

American actor and writer

- Born: Gianni Vincent Paolo; May 27, 1996 (age 29); Providence, Rhode Island, U.S.
- Occupations: Actor; screenwriter; director
- Years active: 2016–present
- Website: instagram.com/giannivpaolo

Gianni Vincent Paolo (born May 27, 1996), is an American actor, writer and director known for playing the role of Brayden Weston on Power and its spin-off and sequel, Power Book II: Ghost. He is also notable for portraying Chaz in the 2019 horror film Ma.

== Early life ==
Paolo was born on May 27, 1996, in Providence, Rhode Island. In 2017, he was drafted 202nd overall in the Quebec Major Junior Hockey League draft by the Shawinigan Cataractes. His rights were later acquired by the Charlottetown Islanders in exchange for a second round pick.

Paolo later moved to Los Angeles to pursue acting at the age of 19.

== Career ==
In collaboration with Michael Rainey Jr., Paolo has launched an entertainment company, Twenty Two Entertainment, which is fully funded by Kenan Thompson's Artists For Artists and set to produce films, TV series, and multimedia ventures.

Gianni is also known for his work on the This Past Weekend podcast hosted by comedian Theo Von.

On March 27, 2024, it was announced that Gianni has joined Sophie Turner and Katey Sagal in the Paramount Pictures thriller Trust.

== Filmography ==
Film
Year	Title	Role	Notes	Ref.
2019	Ma	Chaz	Main role	
2016	Arlo: The Burping Pig	Guy in Park	main role	
2025	Trust			

Television
Year	Title	Role	Notes	Ref.
2020–2024	Power Book II: Ghost	Brayden Weston	Main role	
2018–2019	Power	Brayden Weston	Recurring role	
2018	The Fosters	Bryan	Episode: "Mother's Day"	
2017	Chance	Young Lambert	Episode: "Define Normal"	
2017	The Mick	Jordan	Episode: "The Divorce"	

Music video
Year	Artist(s)	Title	Role	Ref.
2017	Ellie Goulding & Kygo	"First Time"	Himself	
