= Power Book II: Ghost =

2020 American crime drama television series

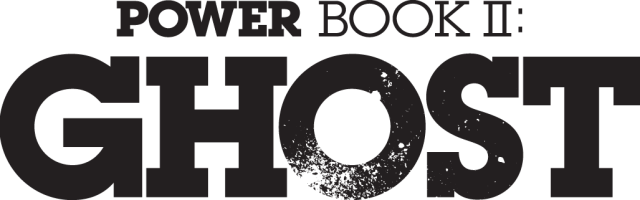
- Genre: Crime drama
- Created by: Courtney A. Kemp
- Based on: Power created by Courtney A. Kemp
- Starring: Michael Rainey Jr.; Shane Johnson; Gianni Paolo; Melanie Liburd; Lovell Adams-Gray; Daniel Bellomy; Quincy Tyler Bernstine; Paige Hurd; Woody McClain; Justin Marcel McManus; Method Man; LaToya Tonodeo; Mary J. Blige; Naturi Naughton; Paton Ashbrook; Berto Colon; Alix Lapri; Daniel Sunjata; Larenz Tate; Moriah Brown; Monique Curnen; Keesha Sharp; David Walton; Caroline Chikezie; Michael Ealy
- Opening theme: "Big Rich Town" by 50 Cent and Joe
- Composer: Jeff Russo
- Country of origin: United States
- Original language: English
- No. of seasons: 4
- No. of episodes: 40

Production
- Executive producers: Bart Wenrich; Chris Salek; End of Episode, Inc.; 50 Cent; Danielle DeJesus; Geoffrey Thorne; Mark Canton; Shana Stein
- Running time: 56–68 minutes
- Production companies: End of Episode, Inc.; G-Unit Film & Television Inc.; Atmosphere Television; CBS Studios; Lionsgate Television

Original release
- Network: Starz
- Release: September 6, 2020 – October 4, 2024

Related
- Power Universe

Power Book II: Ghost, or simply Ghost is an American crime drama television series created by Courtney A. Kemp, that aired from September 6, 2020, to October 4, 2024 on Starz. The series is both a direct sequel and spin-off to Power.

In December 2021, the series was renewed for a third season which premiered on March 17, 2023. In January 2023, ahead of the third season premiere, the series was renewed for a fourth season. On March 14, 2024, it was announced that the fourth season would be the series' final season and is split into two parts; part one premiered on June 7, and part two premiered on September 6.

== Premise ==
Ghost is the immediate fallout of the original series, and follows Tariq St. Patrick navigating his new life, in which his desire to shed his father's legacy comes up against the mounting pressure to save his family. Along the way, Tariq gets entangled in the affairs of the cutthroat Tejada family, adding further complications as he tries to balance his drug operations with his education, love life, family affairs, scrutiny from local and federal law enforcement.

== Cast and characters ==
Character	Portrayed by	Seasons			
Character	Portrayed by	1	2	3	4
Tariq St. Patrick	Michael Rainey Jr.	Main	Main	Main	Main
Cooper Saxe	Shane Johnson	Main	Main	Main	
Brayden Weston	Gianni Paolo	Main	Main	Main	Main
Caridad "Carrie" Milgram	Melanie Liburd	Main	Main		
Dru Tejada	Lovell Adams-Gray	Main	Main	Main	Main
Ezekiel "Zeke" Cross	Daniel Bellomy	Main	Main		Guest
Tameika Washington	Quincy Tyler Bernstine	Main	Guest	Guest	
Lauren Baldwin	Paige Hurd	Main	Main	Main	
Lorenzo "Cane" Tejada Jr.	Woody McClain	Main	Main	Main	Main
Jabari Reynolds	Justin Marcel McManus	Main	Guest		
Davis MacLean	Method Man	Main	Main	Main	Main
Diana Tejada	LaToya Tonodeo	Main	Main	Main	Main
Monet Stewart Tejada	Mary J. Blige	Main	Main	Main	Main
Tasha St. Patrick	Naturi Naughton	Main	Guest	Guest	Recurring
Dante "Mecca" Spears	Daniel Sunjata		Main		Guest
Jenny Sullivan	Paton Ashbrook	Guest	Main	Main	Guest
Lorenzo Tejada Sr.	Berto Colon	Recurring	Main	Recurring	Guest
Effie Morales	Alix Lapri	Recurring	Main	Main	Main
Rashad Tate	Larenz Tate	Recurring	Main	Main	Guest
Keke Travis	Moriah Brown			Main	
Blanca Rodriguez	Monique Curnen	Recurring	Guest	Main	Guest
Harper Benett	Keesha Sharp			Main	
Lucas Weston	David Walton			Main	
Noma Asaju	Caroline Chikezie			Recurring	Main
Don Carter	Michael Ealy				Main

=== Main ===
- Michael Rainey Jr. as Tariq St. Patrick, the son of James "Ghost" St. Patrick and Tasha Green-St. Patrick, who is slowly following in his father's footsteps as a drug dealer.
- Shane Johnson as Cooper Saxe, the attorney protecting Tariq, despite failed attempts to catch Ghost, Tasha, Tommy and Tariq. (seasons 1–3)
- Gianni Paolo as Brayden Weston, Tariq's best friend and business partner from Choate, as well as a former roommate at Stansfield. He now works at Weston Holdings, his family's hedge fund on Wall Street.
- Melanie Liburd as Caridad "Carrie" Milgram, one of Tariq's professors who had a secret relationship with Zeke. (seasons 1–2)
- Lovell Adams-Gray as Dru Tejada, the artistic middle child of Monet and Lorenzo, and brother of Cane and Diana who is gay.
- Daniel Bellomy as Ezekiel "Zeke" Cross, Tariq's tutee who was the star basketball player at Stansfield, Monet's hidden son with Mecca and Carrie's love interest. (seasons 1–2; guest season 4)
- Quincy Tyler Bernstine as Tameika Washington, an attorney formerly affiliated with Saxe (season 1; guest seasons 2–3)
- Paige Hurd as Lauren Baldwin, Tariq's former classmate and ex-girlfriend who is currently in hiding after a failed murder attempt on her (seasons 1–3).
- Woody McClain as Lorenzo "Cane" Tejada Jr., the ruthless eldest child of Monet and Lorenzo, brother of Dru and Diana, Tariq's main rival and Effie's lover.
- Justin Marcel McManus as Jabari Reynolds, Carrie's ex-boyfriend and Tariq's professor. (season 1; guest season 2)
- Method Man as Davis MacLean, Tasha, Tariq and the Tejadas' lawyer, who looks to win at all costs.
- LaToya Tonodeo as Diana Tejada, the youngest child of Monet and Lorenzo and sister of Dru and Cane, who is also in the drug business, a fellow student at Stanfield and Tariq's love interest and later, mother of his child.
- Mary J. Blige as Monet Stewart Tejada, queenpin and second-in-command of the Tejada drug cartel, mother of Cane, Dru, Diana, and Zeke.
- Naturi Naughton as Tasha St. Patrick, Tariq's mother and James "Ghost" St Patrick's widow. (season 1; recurring season 4, guest seasons 2–3)
- Daniel Sunjata as Dante "Mecca" Spears, Cane's business associate, a former associate of Felipe Lobos, Monet's old flame and the father of Zeke. (season 2; guest season 4)
- Paton Ashbrook as Jenny Sullivan, an attorney working on the Jabari Reynolds case who is sleeping with Saxe. (seasons 2–3; recurring season 1; guest season 4)
- Berto Colon as Lorenzo Tejada Sr., Monet's husband, the leader of the Tejada operation and father to Cane, Dru and Diana. (season 2; recurring seasons 1 and 3; guest season 4)
- Alix Lapri as Effie Morales, Tariq's drug dealer ex-girlfriend at Choate and business partner, and later, Cane's love interest (seasons 2–4; recurring season 1)
- Larenz Tate as Councilman Rashad Tate, Ghost's former political rival and later an ethics professor at Stansfield. (seasons 2–3; recurring season 1; guest season 4)
- Keesha Sharp as Professor Harper Benett, Tariq's American Psyche professor, and also Councilman Tate fiancée (season 3)
- David Walton as Lucas Weston, Brayden's uncle and the CEO of Weston Holdings (season 3)
- Monique Curnen as NYPD Sergeant Blanca Rodriguez, an NYPD Sergeant who investigated Ghost and Tariq in the past (season 3; recurring season 1; guest seasons 2 and 4)
- Moriah Brown as Keke Travis, an employee at Weston Holdings, and Brayden's colleague and love interest (season 3)
- Michael Ealy as Detective Don Carter, a determined and vindictive NYPD detective who begins investigating Tariq's case at Paz's behest (season 4)
- Caroline Chikezie as Noma Asaju, a terrifying drug lord, Mecca's boss and Cane and MacLean's lover. (season 4; recurring season 3)

=== Recurring ===
- Kathleen Garrett as Judge Nina Larkin, the judge presiding over Tasha St. Patrick's case (season 1)
- LightSkinKeisha as BruShandria Carmichael, Tariq's classmate at Stansfield.
- Zoe Whitford as Ashley Fitzpatrick, Tariq's privileged classmate at Stansfield.
- Debbi Morgan as Estelle Green, Tasha's mother and Tariq and Yas' grandmother (seasons 2–3; guest season 1)
- Paris Morgan as Yasmine St. Patrick, Tariq's little sister and Ghost and Tasha's daughter (season 1; guest seasons 2–4)
- Victor Garber as Simon Stern, Ghost's former business partner (seasons 1–2)
- Bruce Altman as Oliver Simmons, Tariq's philosophy professor (seasons 1 and 4)
- Mark Feuerstein as Steven Ott, the representative of the political party Ghost was part of (seasons 1–2; guest season 3)
- Sung Kang as John Mak, an attorney formerly involved in the Lobos-Ghost investigation (season 1)
- Sherri Saum as Paula Matarazzo, top investigator and right hand of Davis (season 1; guest season 2)
- Shalim Ortiz as Danilo Ramirez, an NYPD officer stationed in the Tejadas' backyard of Queens, NY, and Monet's ex-boyfriend before Cane killed him (season 1)
- Brandi Denise Boyd as Epiphany Turner, a stripper single mom, who worked together with Tasha (season 1)
- Cory Jeacoma as Trace Weston, Brayden's entitled brother (seasons 1–3; guest season 4)
- Samantha Blaire Cutler as Becca Weston, sister to Brayden and Trace, daughter of Robert and Nicole
- Marcus Anderson Jr. as Lil' Guap, the Tejada's former partner, before Tariq, who frequently worked with Cane before being killed by Dru (seasons 1–2)
- Brittani Tucker as Chelle, Rel's ex-girlfriend who ends up being Cane's short-lived fling (seasons 1–2)
- Andrea Lee Christensen as Riley Saxe-Merchant, Cooper's niece and Brayden's new love interest (season 1)
- Bradley Gibson as Everett Neal, a member of Zeke's basketball team and Dru's new love interest (seasons 1–3)
- Geoffrey Owens, as Daniel Warren, a lawyer Ghost trusted with the handling of his will and assets (seasons 1–2)
- Michael J. Ferguson as Francis "2-Bit" Johnson, a convicted felon formerly associated with Andre Coleman and Tommy Egan (season 1; guest seasons 3–4)
- Jimmie Saito as Chef Eric Kamura, Mecca's right-hand man and chef (season 2)
- Jeff Hephner as Kevin Whitman, the lead detective investigating Jabari's murder until he was killed by Monet. (seasons 2–3)
- Lahmard Tate as Kamaal Tate, Rashad's brother who is a police officer (seasons 2 and 4)
- Frank Whaley as Judge Kenneth Lucas, the judge presiding over Tariq's case (season 2)
- Zephani Idoko as Stephanie, Davis MacLean's Stylist (season 2)
- Petey McGee as Salim Ashe Freeman, professor Benett's assistant and Diana's new love interest (season 3; guest season 4)
- Gbenga Akinnagbe as Ron Samuel Jenkins aka RSJ, one of the richest and most powerful men in the world, who is being pursued by Weston Holdings for a partnership (season 3)
- Kyle Vincent Terry as Obi Okeke, Noma's right-hand man (seasons 3–4)
- Erik Hernandez as Gordo Castillo, Frank and Evelyn's son and Dru's new love interest (season 3)
- Kevin Tyler Rodriguez as Angel 'Junior' Young, a young DEA agent and Paz Valdes' son (season 3; guest season 4)
- Golden Brooks as Janet Stewart, Monet's cousin (season 4)
- Alison Luff as Felicia Lewis, a detective who works closely with Carter (season 4)
- Sydney Winbush as Anya Convington, Noma's daughter and Tariq's new love interest (season 4)
- Stephanie Suganami Shepard as Perla Tanaka, an attorney in Davis's team and his close confidante (season 4)
- Talia Robinson as Elle, a college student and band singer, who becomes Brayden's new love interest (season 4)

=== Guest stars ===
- David Zayas as Uncle Frank Castillo, a Tejada family friend who tried to set them up (season 1)
- Glynn Turman as Gabriel, uncle to Ghost (season 1)
- Elizabeth Rodriguez as Paz Valdes, Angela Valdes' sister (seasons 1 and 3–4)
- Jeff Auer as Robert Weston, the patriarch of the Weston family
- Angel Reda as Nicole Weston, wife to Robert and mother to Brayden, Trace and Becca
- Donshea Hopkins as Raina St. Patrick, Tariq's twin sister (seasons 1–2)
- Luenell Campbell as Ms. Richards, Spanky's mother (season 1)
- Jackie Long as Rico Barnes, the man who provides the drugs for the Tejadas to distribute (season 1)
- Laz Alonso as Samuel Santana, a detective investigating the death of the GTG assassin on the faculty grounds (season 1)
- Joseph Sikora as Tommy Egan, Ghost's best friend, Tariq's godfather and surrogate uncle and Cash's surrogate father (seasons 1 and 3)
- Denim Roberson as Cash Grant, LaKeisha Grant's son (season 1)
- Redman (season 2) and Jordan Mahome (season 3) as Theo Rollins, Davis' older brother who is in prison
- 50 Cent as Kanan Stark, Ghost's old friend and Tariq's mentor of sort, whom he got killed and has nightmares of (season 2)
- Alani "La La" Anthony as LaKeisha Grant, Tommy's ex and Tasha's former best friend, who was murdered by her in order to protect Tariq (season 2)
- Marcus Callender as Raymond "Ray Ray" Walker, the corrupt cop who murdered Raina St. Patrick and became Tariq's first victim (season 2)
- Jerry Ferrara as Joseph Proctor, Ghost and Tommy's former lawyer who was murdered by the latter, after Tariq allowed him access to his penthouse (season 2)
- Lauren Vélez as Evelyn Castillo, Frank's wife, who shows up after her husband has gone missing (seasons 2–3)
- Emeka Okafor as himself and a basketball trainer for Zeke (season 2)
- Patricia Kalember as Kate Egan, Tommy's mother (season 3)
- Moise Amadou as Kene Okeke, Obi's litte brother (season 4)
- Wesley Han as Pinky, a private investigator who works with Tariq (seasons 3–4)
- Pha'rez Lass as Marcus "Zion" Washington, a high-level distributor and one of Davis' clients in the past (season 4)
- Jequrey Slaton as Roman Price, a low-lever drug dealer working for Zion and Tariq's competitor (season 4)
- Terry Serpico as Wiley Adams, a criminal broker for a senator and acquaintance of Maclean's (season 4)
- Johnath Davis as Kevin Grant, Adams' aide and bodyguard (season 4)
- Sahr Ngaujah as Chinedu, Noma's brother and supervisor who came over from Nigeria (season 4)

== Episodes ==
=== Series overview ===
Season	Episodes	Originally released	
Season	Episodes	First released	Last released
1	10	September 6, 2020	January 3, 2021
2	10	November 21, 2021	February 6, 2022
3	10	March 17, 2023	May 26, 2023
4	10	June 7, 2024	October 4, 2024

=== Season 1 (2020–21) ===
No. overall	No. in season	Title	Directed by	Written by	Original release date	U.S. viewers (millions)
1	1	"The Stranger"	Anthony Hemingway	Courtney A. Kemp	September 6, 2020	0.680
2	2	"Exceeding Expectations"	Marisol Adler	Monica Mitchell	September 13, 2020	0.564
3	3	"Play the Game"	Hernan Otaño	Gabriela Uribe & Aixsha Hiciano	September 20, 2020	0.535
4	4	"The Prince"	Shana Stein	Charles Ray Hamilton & Julian Ouanés	September 27, 2020	0.566
5	5	"The Gift of the Magi"	Erica A. Watson	Andre J. Ferguson	October 4, 2020	0.593
6	6	"Good vs. Evil"	Eif Rivera	Geoffrey Thorne	December 6, 2020	0.587
7	7	"Sex Week"	Hernan Otaño	Monica Mitchell & Charles Ray Hamilton	December 13, 2020	0.583
8	8	"Family First"	Stewart Schill	Andre J. Ferguson & Julian Ouanés	December 20, 2020	0.468
9	9	"Monster"	Bart Wenrich	Gabriela Uribe	December 27, 2020	0.560
10	10	"Heart of Darkness"	Rob Hardy	Story by : Aixsha Hiciano; Teleplay by : Randy Huggins & Aixsha Hiciano	January 3, 2021	0.617

=== Season 2 (2021–22) ===
No. overall	No. in season	Title	Directed by	Written by	Original release date	U.S. viewers (millions)
11	1	"Free Will Is Never Free"	Rob Hardy	Brett Mahoney	November 21, 2021	0.518
12	2	"Selfless Acts?"	Stewart Schill	Monica Mitchell	November 28, 2021	0.526
13	3	"The Greater Good"	Brendan Walsh	Kevin J. Hynes & Oneika Barrett	December 5, 2021	0.477
14	4	"Gettin' These Ends"	Ruben Garcia	Charles Ray Hamilton	December 12, 2021	0.423
15	5	"Coming Home to Roost"	Shana Stein	Aixsha Hiciano	December 19, 2021	0.449
16	6	"What's Free?"	Nefertite Nguvu	Andre J. Ferguson	January 9, 2022	0.555
17	7	"Forced My Hand"	Hernan Otaño	Monica Mitchell & Lacey Herbert	January 16, 2022	0.522
18	8	"Drug Related"	Shana Stein	Julian Ouanes	January 23, 2022	0.566
19	9	"A Fair Fight?"	Bart Wenrich	Sara Rose Feinberg	January 30, 2022	0.533
20	10	"Love and War"	Rob Hardy	Gabriela Uribe	February 6, 2022	0.801

=== Season 3 (2023) ===
No. overall	No. in season	Title	Directed by	Written by	Original release date	U.S. viewers (millions)
21	1	"Your Perception, Your Reality"	Geary McLeod	Brett Mahoney & Ashley Victoria Hudson	March 17, 2023	0.362
22	2	"Need vs. Greed"	Ruben Garcia	Monica Mitchell	March 24, 2023	0.236
23	3	"Human Capital"	Eif Rivera	Vladimir Cvetko & Jormond Thompson	March 31, 2023	0.280
24	4	"The Land of Opportunity"	Stewart Schill	Andre J. Ferguson	April 7, 2023	0.265
25	5	"No More Second Chances"	Rob Hardy	Lacey Herbert	April 14, 2023	0.276
26	6	"Land of Lies"	Erica Watson	Monica Mitchell & Gabriela Uribe	April 21, 2023	0.248
27	7	"Deal or No Deal"	Joy T. Lane	Thomas Wong	April 28, 2023	0.279
28	8	"Sacrifice"	Dawn Wilkinson	Sara Rose Feinberg	May 5, 2023	0.248
29	9	"A Last Gift"	Brendan Walsh	Gabriela Uribe	May 19, 2023	0.209
30	10	"Divided We Stand"	Geary McLeod	Vladimir Cvetko	May 26, 2023	0.339

=== Season 4 (2024) ===
No. overall	No. in season	Title	Directed by	Written by	Original release date	U.S. viewers (millions)
31	1	"I Don't Die Easy"	Brendan Walsh	Michael C. Martin	June 7, 2024	0.206
32	2	"To Thine Own Self"	Jono Oliver	Sara Rose Feinberg	June 14, 2024	0.213
33	3	"Birthright"	Ben Semanoff	LaDarian Smith	June 21, 2024	0.178
34	4	"The Reckoning"	Monica Raymund	Jamila Daniel	June 28, 2024	0.193
35	5	"Ego Death"	Batan Silva	Lacey Herbert	July 5, 2024	0.260
36	6	"The Devil's Playground"	Sharon Lewis	Paul Eriksen & Stacey Matthew	September 6, 2024	0.170
37	7	"I Can't Fix This"	Ruben Garcia	Jormond Thompson	September 13, 2024	0.160
38	8	"Higher Calling"	Joy T. Lane	Ayanna A. Floyd	September 20, 2024	0.154
39	9	"Married to the Game"	Brendan Walsh	Ashley Victoria Hudson	September 27, 2024	0.218
40	10	"Ghost in the Machine"	Dawn Wilkinson	Corey Deshon	October 4, 2024	0.268

== Production ==
=== Development ===
On July 26, 2019, Starz announced the straight-to-series order with the news that Mary J. Blige would star. On February 9, 2020, Starz announced the premise of the series. On September 22, 2020, Starz renewed the series for a second season. On December 7, 2021, Starz renewed the series for a third season with Brett Mahoney taking over as the showrunner. On January 30, 2023, ahead of the third season premiere, Starz renewed the series for a fourth season. On March 14, 2024, it was announced that the fourth season will be the series final season and will have two parts.

=== Casting ===
Mary J. Blige was cast on July 26, 2019, with the initial news. On January 14, 2020, Method Man was cast in a main role. The remainder of the main cast was entirely announced on February 9, 2020. On July 21, 2020, Sherri Saum was cast for the series. Two days later, Shalim Ortiz was cast in a recurring role. On February 24, Daniel Sunjata was cast as a new series regular for the second season. On April 27, 2021, Redman joined the cast in a guest starring role for the second season. On June 21, 2021, Paton Ashbrook, Berto Colon, and Alix Lapri were promoted to series regulars while Lahmard Tate joined the cast in a recurring role, reprising his role as Kamaal Tate from the sixth season of Power. On October 1, 2021, Frank Whaley joined the cast in a recurring role for the second season. In January 2022, Keesha Sharp, David Walton, Monique Curnen, and Moriah Brown were cast as series regulars while Petey McGee joined the cast in a recurring role for the third season. In March 2022, Gbenga Akinnagbe, Kyle Vincent Terry, and Caroline Chikezie were cast in recurring roles. Upon the fourth season renewal announcement, Michael Ealy joined the cast as a new series regular.

== Release ==
The series' official trailer was released on August 4, 2020. The series premiered on September 6, 2020 on Starz. The second season premiered on November 21, 2021. The third season premiered on March 17, 2023. The fourth season aired in two parts; part one premiered on June 7, 2024, and part two premiered on September 6, 2024.

== Reception ==
=== Ratings ===
Power Book II: Ghost : U.S. viewers per episode (thousands)

Season	Episode number										Average
Season	1	2	3	4	5	6	7	8	9	10	Average
1	680	564	535	566	593	587	583	468	560	617	570
2	518	526	477	423	449	555	522	566	533	801	537
3	362	236	280	265	276	248	279	248	209	339	274
4	206	213	178	193	260	170	160	154	218	268	202

Audience measurement performed by Nielsen Media Research (Note: The viewership statistics in the graph and table are sourced from the citations in the season-specific tables above.)

=== Accolades ===
Awards and nominations received by Power Book II: Ghost
Award	Year	Category	Nominee(s)	Result	Ref.
NAACP Image Awards	2021	Outstanding Drama Series	Power Book II: Ghost	Won	
NAACP Image Awards	2021	Outstanding Supporting Actor in a Drama Series	Clifford 'Method Man' Smith Jr	Won	
NAACP Image Awards	2021	Outstanding Supporting Actress in a Drama Series	Mary J. Blige	Won	
NAACP Image Awards	2022	Outstanding Supporting Actor in a Drama Series	Clifford 'Method Man' Smith Jr	Won	
NAACP Image Awards	2022	Outstanding Supporting Actress in a Drama Series	Mary J. Blige	Won	
